= Diego Viamontes =

Mexican gridiron football player (born 1990)

Reyes de Jalisco
- Positions: Wide receiver, kickoff returner
- CFL status: Global

Personal information
- Born: September 23, 1990 (age 36)
- Listed height: 5 ft 10 in (1.78 m)
- Listed weight: 189 lb (86 kg)

Career information
- College: Universidad del Valle de México
- CFL draft: 2019 LFA: 1st round, 1st overall pick

Career history
- 2016–2017: Raptors de Naucalpan
- 2017: Monterrey Steel*
- 2018–2019: Mayas CDMX
- 2019–2021: Edmonton Elks
- 2022: Cabo Marlins
- 2023: Dinos de Saltillo
- 2024–: Reyes de Jalisco
- * Offseason or practice squad member only
- Stats at CFL.ca

Diego Viamontes
Medal record

Men's American football

Representing Mexico

World Championship
Bronze medal – third place	2015 Canton	Team

Men's flag football

Representing Mexico

World Games
Bronze medal – third place	2022 Birmingham	Team

IFAF Americas Continental Championship
Silver medal – second place	2023 Charlotte	Team

Diego Jair Viamontes Cotera (born September 23, 1990) is a Mexican professional gridiron football wide receiver and kickoff returner for the Reyes de Jalisco of the Liga de Fútbol Americano Profesional (LFA). He was the first overall pick by the Eskimos in the 2019 CFL–LFA draft after playing with the Mayas CDMX in the LFA.

== Early career ==
Viamontes began playing American football in 2001 at the age of 11. He went on to play in high school as well as ONEFA college football at the Universidad del Valle de México.

== Professional career ==
Viamontes played for the Raptors de Naucalpan during the inaugural 2016 season of the Liga de Fútbol Americano Profesional (LFA); the Raptors would go on to lose Tazón México I to the Mayas CDMX. He played for one more year before being traded to the Mayas CDMX ahead of the 2018 season. That year he recorded 26 receptions for 519 yards and seven touchdowns.

He also played for the Monterrey Steel of the National Arena League during the pre-season in 2017. Among Viamotes' teammates were future CFL players René Brassea and Greg Reid.

=== CFL ===
Viamontes was selected first overall by the Edmonton Eskimos in the 2019 CFL–LFA draft in Mexico City in January. After playing another season with the Mayas CDMX in the spring, he appeared in both preseason games for the Eskimos in May, lining up on both offense and special teams. After beginning the 2019 season on the practice squad, Viamontes was called up to the main roster ahead of their week 18 matchup against the BC Lions. He made his CFL debut on October 12 against the Lions. On November 2, he became the first Global player to ever start a CFL game when he started at receiver during the Eskimos' regular-season finale against the Saskatchewan Roughriders. However, he was not targeted in the passing game; Viamontes instead recorded 3 kickoff returns for 44 yards and a missed-field goal returned for 25 yards. This was also the first CFL game where two Global players dressed in a game for the same team, with Maxime Rouyer also playing for Edmonton.

Following a cancelled 2020 CFL season, Viamontes spent most of the next year on the practice roster. During that time, Canadian receiver Daniel Vandervoort paid tribute to Viamontes with a touchdown celebration. Viamontes dressed for the first time in 2021 during the last game of the season as a last minute replacement for Derel Walker, but recorded no statistics. Viamontes signed a two-year extension with the Elks in December 2021. However, Viamontes and most of Edmonton's incumbent Global players were released under new Head Coach and General Manager Chris Jones prior to the 2022 CFL global draft.

=== Return to Mexico ===
Viamontes played with the Cabo Marlins of the Fútbol Americano de México league in 2022.

In November 2022, Viamontes returned to the LFA, after signing with the Dinos de Saltillo ahead of the 2023 LFA season.

On January 13, 2024, Viamontes was traded to the Reyes de Jalisco in exchange for Alejandro Coronado and a 2024 fourth round draft pick.

== International career ==
Viamontes represented the national under-19 team at the 2009 IFAF Junior World Cup in Canton, Ohio.

While still in college, Viamontes played for the Mexico national team at the 2011 IFAF World Championship in Austria. Notably, he returned a kickoff 82 yards for a touchdown in the defeat to Japan in the bronze medal game. He later won a bronze with Mexico at the 2015 edition.

== Personal life ==
With the 2020 CFL season cancelled due to the COVID-19 pandemic in Canada, Viamontes and his wife opened a cafe and Mexican chocolate shop, ch. cafeteria, in Edmonton. The "ch." is a play on "Chilango" a slang term for residents of Mexico City.

Following his release by the Elks in early 2022, Viamontes remained active in the community, holding a charity drive for the Rainbow Society of Alberta, promising to cut his long hair.
