= 2019 CFL–LFA draft =

Canadian football draft

General information
- Sport: Canadian football
- Date: January 14, 2019
- Time: 10:00 am CST
- Location: Mexico City

Overview
- 27 total selections in 3 rounds
- First selection: Diego Viamontes, WR, Edmonton Eskimos

The 2019 CFL–LFA draft took place on January 14, 2019. Twenty-seven players were chosen from an invited pool of 51 Mexican players: 34 from the Liga de Fútbol Americano Profesional (LFA) (a professional American football league) and 17 seniors from Mexican university teams.

== Background ==
In October 2018, Canadian Football League commissioner Randy Ambrosie outlined a plan to grow the CFL's presence, which he dubbed CFL 2.0, including growth internationally. In November 2018, the LFA signed a non-binding Letter of Intent with the CFL to share resources and to allow for at least one CFL game to be played in Mexico, as wells as lay the ground work for special Mexican-specific editions of the CFL Combine and CFL draft.

On January 11, 2019, 51 players from the LFA and Mexican college ranks were announced as participants in a combine to beheld on January 13 and a 27-player draft to be held on January 14, 2019. Each CFL team sent scouts and were reported to likely receive four picks. Consensus after the combine was that 6-18 players were of (or could be made into) CFL camp caliber, but that a majority of players had no professional potential. This led to criticism of commissioner Ambrosie for spending time and resources on this additional draft, when a collective bargaining agreement with the CFLPA still had not been reached. Originally, there were plans for a 4-round 36-player draft but, after the combine and interviews, was scaled back to a 3-round, 27-player draft. BC Lions General Manager Ed Hervey was reported to have, "settled for athletic and the ability to speak English" in player evaluations. It was not reported if drafted players would count towards a team's National or International slots.

On January 12, 2019, the LFA held their own domestic 66-player draft in advance of the CFL's draft.

== Selection order ==
Unlike the normal CFL draft, which sets selection order based on a team's record the previous season (similar to the NFL draft), the CFL–LFA draft instead used a weighted lottery system where teams receive more balls in a selection bin depending on their record, with more balls increasing the chance at a higher draft priority (similar to the NBA draft). The draft order was set the night before the draft: The Edmonton Eskimos received the first pick, despite Edmonton's general manager and head coach both skipping the combine and draft process, sending a subordinate instead. Edmonton GM Brock Sunderland in particular was largely dismissive of the entire process.

Pick #	CFL Team	Lottery weight (% chance for 1st pick)
1	Edmonton Eskimos	6/45 (13.3%)
2	Ottawa Redblacks	2/45 (4.4%)
3	Montreal Alouettes	8/45 (17.8%)
4	Toronto Argonauts	9/45 (20%)
5	Hamilton Tiger-Cats	7/45 (15.6%)
6	Saskatchewan Roughriders	3/45 (6.7%)
7	BC Lions	5/45 (11.1%)
8	Winnipeg Blue Bombers	4/45 (8.9%)
9	Calgary Stampeders	1/45 (2.2%)

== Selections ==
=== Round one ===
Pick #	CFL Team	Player	Position	College/LFA team
1	Edmonton Eskimos	Diego Viamontes	WR	Mayas CDMX
2	Ottawa Redblacks	José Carlos Maltos	K	Fundidores de Monterrey
3	Montreal Alouettes	Enrique Yenny	K	ITESM Toluca
4	Toronto Argonauts	Uriel Martínez	DE	UANL
5	Hamilton Tiger-Cats	José Humberto Noriega Montiel	WR	Artilleros de Puebla
6	Saskatchewan Roughriders	René Brassea	OL	Fundidores de Monterrey
7	BC Lions	Octavio González	DL	Fundidores de Monterrey
8	Winnipeg Blue Bombers	Sergio Schiaffino	DB	Dinos de Saltillo
9	Calgary Stampeders	Andrés Salgado	WR	Condors CDMX

=== Round two ===
Pick #	CFL Team	Player	Position	College/LFA team
10	Edmonton Eskimos	Daniel Carrete	LB	Dinos de Saltillo
11	Ottawa Redblacks	Guillermo Villalobos	WR	Mexicas de la Ciudad de México
12	Montreal Alouettes	Diego Rojas Kuhlmann	OL	ITESM Toluca
13	Toronto Argonauts	David Casarrubias	DE	UANM
14	Hamilton Tiger-Cats	Omar Cojolum	RB	Mayas CDMX
15	Saskatchewan Roughriders	Carlos Sebastián Olvera Rivas	WR	UDLAP
16	BC Lions	Fernando Richarte	WR	Dinos de Saltillo
17	Winnipeg Blue Bombers	Manuel Eduardo Hernández Reyes	S	UDLAP
18	Calgary Stampeders	Oscar Hugo Silva Reta	K	Dinos de Saltillo

=== Round three ===
Pick #	CFL Team	Player	Position	College/LFA team
19	Edmonton Eskimos	Jose Alfonsin Romero	DB	Artilleros de Puebla
20	Ottawa Redblacks	Maximiliano Soto Esquer	DE	ITESM Monterrey
21	Montreal Alouettes	Juan Manuel Márquez Tamayo	CB	UDLAP
22	Toronto Argonauts	Christian Alejandro Hernández Delgado	LB	Fundidores de Monterrey
23	Hamilton Tiger-Cats	Luis Humberto López Tinoco	RB	Condors CDMX
24	Saskatchewan Roughriders	Francisco Javier García Ramírez	CB	Fundidores de Monterrey
25	BC Lions	Gerardo Álvarez	WR	Dinos de Saltillo
26	Winnipeg Blue Bombers	Gabriel Amavizca	K	BUAP
27	Calgary Stampeders	Guillermo Caldéron Leal	DT	UDLAP

== See also ==
- 2019 CFL draft
- 2019 CFL European draft
