= Bruno Márquez =

Mexican gridiron football player (born 1990)

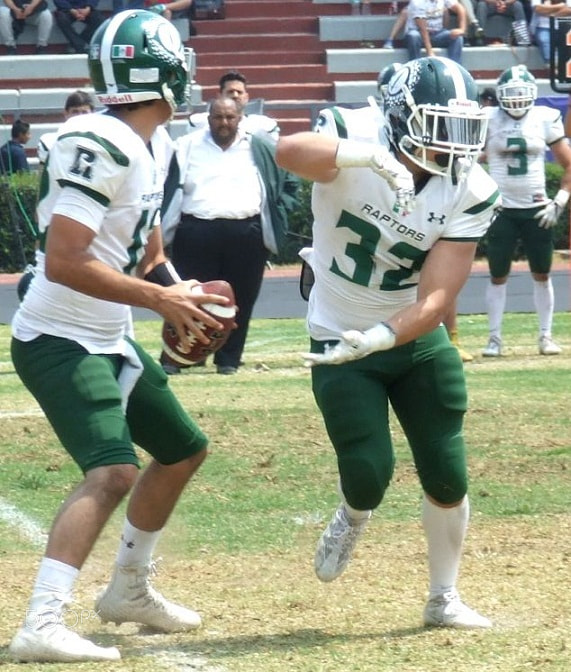
- Márquez (left) in 2017

No. 12, 13
- Position: Quarterback

Personal information
- Born: 21 September 1989 (age 37); Mexico
- Listed height: 6 ft 2 3/4 in (1.90 m)
- Listed weight: 189.5 lb (86 kg)

Career information
- College: UNAM (2009–2013)

Career history
- Olmecas Premier (2014); Condors CDMX (2016); Raptors de Naucalpan (2017–2023)

Awards and highlights
- 2× LFA MVP (2017, 2019); 2× LFA passing touchdowns leader (2017, 2019); 4× LFA passing yards leader (2016, 2017, 2018, 2019); 5× LFA completion percentage leader (2016, 2017, 2018, 2019, 2022); LFA records: Most career passing touchdowns; Most career passing yards; Most passing touchdowns in a season

Career LFA statistics
- Passing completions: 452
- Passing attempts: 557
- Passing yards: 8,946
- TD–INT: 69–20

Bruno Daniel Márquez Albarrán (born 21 September 1989) is a Mexican former professional gridiron football player, having been a quarterback in the Liga de Fútbol Americano Profesional (LFA) for eight seasons. He played college football with Pumas CU before joining the LFA, where he was named league MVP in 2017 and 2019. He has also appeared for the Mexico national team, most notably at the 2011 IFAF World Championship.

Márquez attended the National Autonomous University of Mexico, where he led their football team to two national championships and was named ONEFA player of the year in his final season. A few years after graduation, he accepted an offer to play in the upstart LFA as one of its marquee players. After spending the league's inaugural season with Condors CDMX, Márquez joined Raptors de Naucalpan in 2017. He made an immediate impact in his first year with his new team, leading the league in passing yards and touchdowns en route to a 5–2 regular season record. In 2018 and 2019, Márquez took the Raptors to the league championship game, losing both times. He has set various single-game, single-season and career LFA records.

== College career ==
Márquez played his college football with Pumas CU in the Organización Nacional Estudiantil de Fútbol Americano (ONEFA), representing the National Autonomous University of Mexico (UNAM) from 2009 to 2013. In 38 career games, he completed 447 of 664 passes for 6,910 yards and 73 touchdowns.

After serving as a backup in his first season, Márquez assumed the starting role ahead of his second year after injuries to veteran quarterbacks Salvador Castañeda and José Luis Canales. He threw for four touchdowns in the season opener, a 67–7 blowout win over Halcones UV. Two weeks later, he played an instrumental part in their first win against Auténticos Tigres UANL in 10 years, tossing two touchdowns in their 38–22 victory. Márquez also had four passing touchdowns in a 38–12 win over bitter rivals Águilas Blancas IPN. He ultimately led Pumas CU to an 8–0 regular season record and an ONEFA national title (defeating Auténticos Tigres UANL in the final) on the year of the school's centennial anniversary celebrations.

In 2011, Márquez threw four touchdowns in the Pumas' 44–24 win over Águilas Blancas IPN, but they lost in the national championship game to Auténticos Tigres UANL by a score of 15–16. In 2012, Márquez passed for 123 yards, three touchdowns and two interceptions in the 28–10 derby victory over Águilas Blancas IPN. However, his team lost to Auténticos Tigres UANL in the championship game for the second year in a row. Márquez was named ONEFA offensive player of the year at the Cascos de Oro (Golden Helmets) ceremony.

In 2013, Márquez had a six-touchdown game against Linces UVM and threw for over 900 yards in the first three games of the season. He threw four touchdowns in their regular season finale, a 49–0 blanking of rivals Águilas Blancas IPN in front of about 25,000 fans in Pachuca. Márquez finished the regular season with 2,015 passing yards and 23 touchdowns. He tossed three touchdowns in their 38–7 win over Linces UVM in the national semifinals, which was also his final home game at the Estadio Olímpico Universitario. A week later, Márquez won his second national championship with Pumas CU by passing for two touchdowns in their 28–16 defeat of Auténticos Tigres UANL in the title game at the Estadio Gaspar Mass. He was subsequently named the Eduardo "Pocho" Herrera ONEFA Player of the Year after throwing for 29 touchdowns and only two interceptions in the regular season and playoffs combined.

After his fifth and final year of eligibility, Márquez expressed that he had no interest in continuing his football career and that he would instead look for work related to his marketing degree.

== Professional career ==
In 2014, Márquez played with Olmecas Premier in the semi-professional Futbol Americano Asociacion (FAMA) league. He led the team to an appearance in the championship game, where they lost to Tigres Oro SSP, led by former Águilas Blancas IPN quarterback Raúl Mateos.

=== Condors CDMX ===
When the Liga de Fútbol Americano Profesional (LFA) was announced in early 2016 as a four-team professional spring league, Márquez was announced as one of the league's first players along with Raúl Mateos. He joined Condors CDMX for the 2016 season, and threw two touchdowns in their historic 30–28 win over Mateos and his Eagles squad on opening weekend. However, that would be their only win of the season as injuries derailed the team and they finished with a 1–5 record. Márquez was the league leader in passing yards (1,292), completions (121), and completion percentage (60.2%). He also threw seven touchdowns and seven interceptions.

=== Raptors de Naucalpan ===
Márquez was hesitant to return for a second season due to the hits he took but decided to come back with Raptors de Naucalpan in 2017. They defeated his former team, Condors, by a score of 13–10 in the first game of the season. The following week he set new LFA records by throwing for 423 yards and five touchdowns in their 34–27 win against Dinos Saltillo. He also set league records for longest play from scrimmage (a 94-yard pass to Enrique Barraza) and biggest comeback (27 unanswered points after a 20-point deficit). Overall he led them to a 5–2 record before they were upset by Dinos Saltillo in the first round of the playoffs. He was named league MVP after throwing for 1,543 yards and 15 touchdowns, both league-leading numbers.

The Raptors saw a dip in team performance during the 2018 season, going 3–4 with Márquez at the helm. They started the year out with two promising blowout victories, a 32–0 win over defending champions Mayas CDMX followed by a 46–26 win over the Condors, before being blown out themselves by Fundidores Monterrey in week three. That was the beginning of a four-game losing streak, and they were only able to salvage the last regular season game, also against Fundidores Monterrey, to sneak into the playoffs. Márquez threw two touchdowns in their 21–6 defeat of Dinos Saltillo in the semifinals, winning the North Division title and a berth in Tazón México III. However, the Raptors came up short in the title game, losing 0–17 to Mexicas CDMX at Estadio Azul. On the season, Márquez completed 162 of 261 passes for 1,882 yards and 17 touchdowns, along with three rushing touchdowns.

In 2019, Márquez was able to improve the Raptors' record to 6–2, leading them to their second North Division title in three years. He opened the season with a five-touchdown performance in their 48–12 win over new expansion team Osos Toluca. The Raptors suffered their first loss in week three to Fundidores Monterrey; Márquez's three touchdowns were not enough in the 31–21 defeat. They lost their following game against two-time champions Mayas CDMX before rallying to win the last three games of the year. In the semifinals, the Raptors defeated Fundidores Monterrey 53–47 in an overtime thriller for the division title. However, they fell short in the final once again, losing Tazón México IV to Condors CDMX by a score of 16–20. Márquez won his second MVP award after a historic season, breaking the 2,000-yard mark for the first time ever with 2,344 along with a league-best 18 touchdowns and five interceptions.

After mulling over retirement in the offseason, Márquez came back and threw two touchdowns in their 13–5 win over Mexicas CDMX in the 2020 season opener. However, he injured his hand in the game and was replaced by Canadian import Graham Kelly as the starter in their week two matchup against league newcomers Pioneros Querétaro. He made his return in week four against Osos Toluca, but the season was suspended soon thereafter due to the COVID-19 pandemic in Mexico. The subsequent 2021 season was not played.

== International career ==
While in college, Márquez was called up to the Mexico national team for the 2011 IFAF World Championship in Austria by head coach Raúl Rivera, who doubled as Pumas CU head coach. He replaced starting quarterback Rodrigo Pérez in all three group stage games against Germany, Australia, and the United States. Mexico ultimately lost the bronze medal game to Japan. At the conclusion of his final college season in 2013, Márquez again represented the Mexico national team in an American Bowl exhibition game against the United States. The Aztec Bowl, usually held between teams of college all-stars from the two countries, was cancelled that year, leading organizers to arrange a similar game between both national teams. Márquez threw a touchdown pass to Gerardo Aguilar in Mexico's 30–15 victory in Mexico City. With no professional league in Mexico at the time, he considered this to be the final game of his career.

Márquez was also announced on the 115-man shortlist for the national team ahead of the 2015 IFAF World Championship, though he was not included on the final roster.

== Awards and honors ==
=== Individual ===
- 2× LFA Most Valuable Player (2017, 2019)
- LFA Offensive Player of the Year (2019)
- LFA All-Pro Team (2019)
- 2× LFA passing touchdowns leader (2017, 2018, 2019)
- 4× LFA passing yards leader (2016, 2017, 2018, 2019)
- ONEFA Player of the Year (2013)
- 2× ONEFA Offensive Player of the Year (2011, 2012)
- ONEFA championship game MVP (2013)

=== Team ===
- 2× LFA North Division champions (2018, 2019)
- 2× ONEFA national champions (2010, 2013)

== Personal life ==
The son of Enrique Márquez and Ángeles Albarrán, he attributes his love for the sport to his older brother (also named Enrique), who would make the younger Bruno throw him the football in the backyard in their childhood. Enrique went on to be one of the best wide receivers in Mexican college football history, playing his last season with Pumas CU in 2008.
