= Omar Cojolum =

Mexican gridiron football player (born 1988)

Profile
- Position: Running back

Personal information
- Born: 15 June 1990 (age 36); Mexico
- Listed height: 6 ft 0 in (1.83 m)
- Listed weight: 190 lb (86 kg)

Career information
- College: UVM
- CFL draft: 2019 LFA: 2nd round, 14th overall pick

Career history
- Mayas CDMX (2016–2019); Hamilton Tiger-Cats (2019)*; Dinos de Saltillo (2020, 2022–2023); Raptors de Naucalpan (2026)
- * Offseason or practice squad member only

Awards and highlights
- 2× Tazón México champion (I, II); 3× LFA rushing yards leader (2016, 2017, 2018); 2× LFA rushing touchdowns leader (2017, 2018); LFA records: Most career rushing touchdowns; Most career rushing yards
- Stats at CFL.ca

Omar Alejandro Cojolum Delgado (born 15 June 1990) is a Mexican former professional gridiron football running back. He played college football at the Universidad del Valle de México (UVM). Cojolum started his professional career in 2016 with the Mayas CDMX Liga de Fútbol Americano Profesional (LFA), winning the 2016 and 2017 Tazón México. In 2020, after spending the offseason with the Hamilton Tiger-Cats of the Canadian Football League (CFL), he returned to Mexico and played for the Dinos de Saltillo and the Raptors de Naucalpan.

== Early life ==
Cojolum was born on 15 June 1990 and was raised in Naucalpan, State of Mexico, close to Mexico City, by his mother. He has two brothers, one of them, his elder brother, "forced" him to play American football. Despite initially not wanting to practice American football, Cojolum played in local teams since he was four years old and joined the youth club Mavericks, where he won six championships. Cojolum has stated that the neighborhood where he grew up was dangerous and that many people there ended up on drugs or crime, but thanks to his love for sport he managed to stay out of trouble.

== College career ==
Cojolum was offered a scholarship to play at the Universidad del Valle de México (UVM) joining the Linces UVM, where he played from 2010 to 2015. In 2013, Cojolum had surgery after suffering an injury in a match against Burros Blancos, missing the entire 2013 season.

== Professional career ==
=== Mayas CDMX ===
After finishing his college eligibility with the Linces UVM, Cojolum was signed by the Mayas CDMX as the team's first pick of the inaugural LFA draft. He scored the first points in LFA history, doing so in the league's inaugural match, where the Mayas defeated the Raptors de Naucalpan 34–6.

Cojolum rapidly became one of the league's top players, helping the Mayas to win the Tazón México back to back in 2016 and 2017. He was awarded as the best running back of the 2017 LFA season.

=== Hamilton Tiger-Cats ===
Cojolum was selected by the Hamilton Tiger-Cats as the 14th pick of the second round of the 2019 CFL–LFA draft. He joined the team in the offseason but did not make it to the final roster for the 2019 season.

=== Dinos de Saltillo ===
Cojolum was signed by the Dinos de Saltillo ahead of the 2020 LFA season, though it was ultimately cancelled due to the COVID-19 pandemic in Mexico.

In November 2022, Cojolum was re-signed by the Dinos ahead of the 2023 LFA season.

=== Raptors de Naucalpan ===
Cojolum played with the Raptors de Naucalpan in the 2026 LFA season. He announced his retirement following the team's loss in the semifinals that season, along with teammate Jovanni Carrillo.
