= Fernando Richarte =

Mexican gridiron football player (born 1991)

No. 6 – Fundidores de Monterrey
- Position: Wide receiver

Personal information
- Born: 29 December 1991 (age 34); Monterrey, Nuevo León, Mexico
- Listed height: 6 ft 0 in (1.83 m)
- Listed weight: 183 lb (83 kg)

Career information
- College: UANL
- CFL draft: 2019 LFA: 2nd round, 16th overall pick

Career history
- Dinos de Saltillo (2017–2019); BC Lions (2019–2020); Dinos de Saltillo (2020); Fundidores de Monterrey (2021–present)

Awards and highlights
- Tazón México champion (V)
- Stats at CFL.ca

Fernando Richarte Martínez (born 12 December 1991) is a Mexican professional gridiron football wide receiver for the Fundidores de Monterrey of the Liga de Fútbol Americano Profesional (LFA). He played college football at UANL and had a brief participation in the Canadian Football League (CFL) with the BC Lions.

== College career ==
Born in Monterrey, Nuevo León, Richarte played college football for the Auténticos Tigres UANL of the Autonomous University of Nuevo León, where he earned a degree in Law.

== Professional career ==
Richarte played for the Dinos de Saltillo of the Liga de Fútbol Americano Profesional (LFA) from 2017 to 2019.

In January 2019, Richarte was picked by the BC Lions in the CFL–LFA Draft; he was the team's second selection and the sixteenth overall pick. Richarte joined the BC Lions, alongside fellow countryman Gerardo Álvarez. He made his CFL debut on 10 August against the Hamilton Tiger-Cats and played in six more games.

Richarte joined the Fundidores de Monterrey ahead of the 2021 season.
