= René Brassea =

Mexican gridiron football player (born 1989)

No. 41
- Position: Offensive lineman

Personal information
- Born: 7 October 1989 (age 37); Hermosillo, Sonora, Mexico
- Listed height: 6 ft 4 in (1.93 m)
- Listed weight: 300 lb (136 kg)

Career information
- College: UDLAP
- CFL draft: 2019 LFA: 1st round, 6th overall pick

Career history
- Monterrey Steel (2017); Fundidores de Monterrey (2019); Saskatchewan Roughriders (2019–2020); Dinos de Saltillo (2022–2023)
- Stats at CFL.ca

René Brassea
Medal record

Men's American football

Representing Mexico

World University Championship
Gold medal – first place	2016 Monterrey	Team

René Francisco Brassea Valenzuela (born 7 October 1989) is a Mexican professional gridiron football offensive lineman. He has previously played for the Dinos de Saltillo of the Liga de Fútbol Americano Profesional (LFA). He played college football at UDLAP.

== College career ==
Born in Hermosillo, Sonora, Brassea played college football for UDLAP from 2009 to 2014, winning three national championships with the team (2010, 2013 and 2014). He was named to the ONEFA Liga Mayor Team of the Decade for the 2010s by Mundo del Ovoide.

== Professional career ==
Brassea joined the Fundidores Monterrey of the Professional American Football League of Mexico for the 2019 after trying luck in some American arena football teams.

In January 2019, Brassea was picked by the Saskatchewan Roughriders of the Canadian Football League at the first round of the CFL–LFA Draft. During the 2019 CFL season, Brassea played in 17 games, plus the Western final in the playoffs; the 2020 season was cancelled due to the COVID-19 pandemic. He signed a contract extension with the team on January 6, 2021. He was released on June 21, 2021.

== International career ==
In 2016, Brassea was selected to represent his country at the 2016 World University American Football Championship, where Mexico won a gold medal.
