= Andrés Salgado =

Mexican gridiron football player (born 1991)

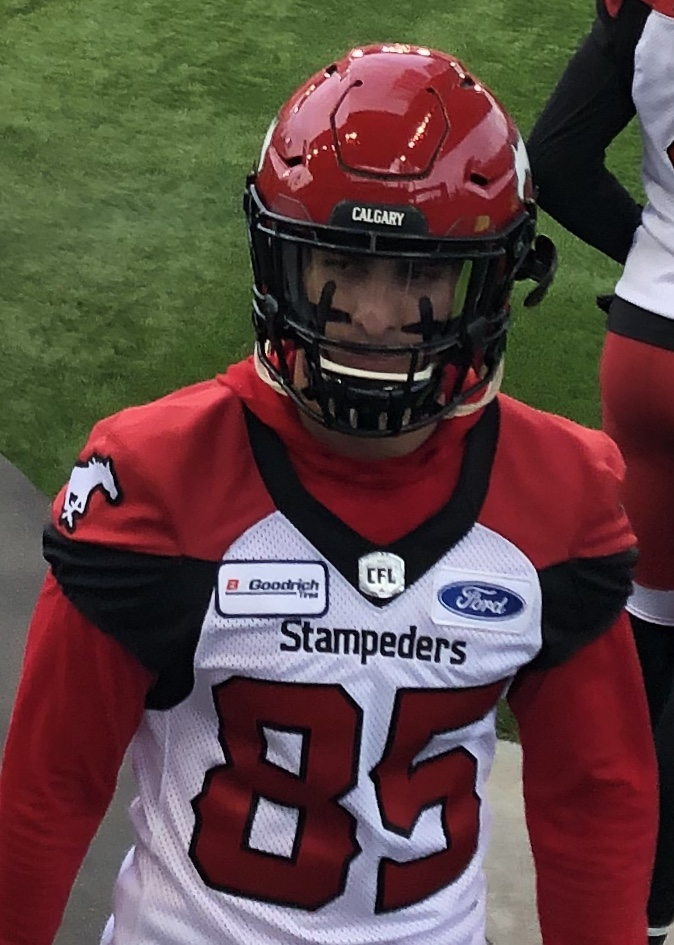
- Salgado with the Calgary Stampeders in 2019

No. 2 – Raptors de Naucalpan
- Position: Wide receiver

Personal information
- Born: 2 December 1991 (age 34); Mexico
- Listed height: 6 ft 2 in (1.88 m)
- Listed weight: 189 lb (86 kg)

Career information
- College: UNAM
- CFL draft: 2019: 1st round, 9th overall pick

Career history
- 2016–2019: Condors CDMX
- 2019–2021: Calgary Stampeders
- 2023–present: Raptors de Naucalpan

Awards and highlights
- Tazón México champion (IV); 3× ONEFA champion (2013, 2014, 2017)
- Stats at CFL.ca

Andrés Salgado Gómez (born December 2, 1991) is a Mexican professional gridiron football wide receiver for the Raptors de Naucalpan of the Liga de Fútbol Americano Profesional (LFA). He also played for the Calgary Stampeders of the Canadian Football League (CFL). He played college football at UNAM and made his pro debut for the Condors CDMX of the LFA before being drafted by the Stampeders.

== Early career ==
Salgado played in youth categories at the National Autonomous University of Mexico. In 2011, he was selected as the only Mexican to be considered for the Rest of the World team that played against the best high school players from the United States in an exhibition match as part of the activities of the Super Bowl XLV.

== College career ==
Salgado played college football for the UNAM Pumas from 2013 to 2018. During this time, Salgado won three ONEFA championships (2013, 2014, 2017).

== Professional career ==
While still a college player, Salgado joined Liga de Fútbol Americano Profesional (LFA) team Condors CDMX in 2016. During his career with the Condors, Salgado was considered to be one of the league's top receivers. He led the 2019 LFA season with an average of 18.9 yards per catch, contributing as a key player for the Condors' victory at the LFA championship game, the Tazón Mexico IV, where he caught a 44-yard touchdown.

Salgado was selected by the Calgary Stampeders as the team's first pick (ninth overall) at the 2019 CFL–LFA draft and was signed on May 16, 2019. He joined the Stampeders training camp just a few days after winning Tazón Mexico IV. Out of the many wide receivers taken in the CFL Global drafts, Salgado was the only one to be targeted with a pass attempt, which fell incomplete. Salgado played in 15 regular season games, recording one special teams tackle.

Following a cancelled 2020 season, Salgado received praise in training camp from receivers coach Marquay McDaniel, hinting at a larger role in the coming season. However, Salgado ended up not playing during the season, spending the entire year on the practice roster. After the first pre-season game in 2022, he was released on May 29, 2022.

Salgado returned to Mexico in 2023, signing with the Raptors de Naucalpan of the LFA.
