= Guillermo Villalobos (gridiron football) =

Mexican gridiron football player (born 1991)

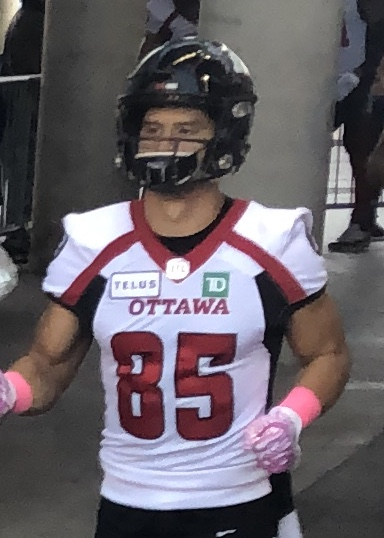

No. 84 – Mexicas de la Ciudad de México
- Position: Wide receiver

Personal information
- Born: 24 July 1991 (age 35); Mexico
- Listed height: 5 ft 11 in (1.80 m)
- Listed weight: 180 lb (82 kg)

Career information
- College: ITESM CEM
- CFL draft: 2019 LFA: 2nd round, 11th overall pick

Career history
- Mexicas de la Ciudad de México (2016–2019); Ottawa Redblacks (2019–2021); Mexicas de la Ciudad de México (2022–present)

Awards and highlights
- Tazón México champion (III); Tazón México MVP (III)
- Stats at CFL.ca

Guillermo Villalobos
Medal record

Representing Mexico

Men's Flag football

World Games
Bronze medal – third place	2022 Birmingham	Team competition

IFAF Americas Championship
Silver medal – second place	2023 Charlotte	Team competition

Guillermo Alberto Villalobos Zanabria (born 24 July 1991) is a Mexican professional gridiron football wide receiver for the Mexicas CDMX of the Liga de Fútbol Americano Profesional (LFA). He played college football at ITESM CEM. Villalobo was drafted in the 2019 CFL-LFA Draft and played during two seasons for the Ottawa Redblacks of the Canadian Football League (CFL).

== Early life ==
Villalobos has played American football since he was five years old. His father also played college football with the Águilas Blancas of the Instituto Politécnico Nacional. Villalobos started in lower categories playing for several teams of the Atizapán area in Greater Mexico City. After finishing high school, he was offered a scholarship to play football in the Borregos Salvajes CEM.

== College career ==
Villalobos joined the ITESM CEM college football team, one of the most successful programs in Mexico, where he earned a major in Business Administration. Despite never winning a championship, Villalobos had a successful career: in 2015 he achieved the single-season receiving yards league record with 1230 yards in 35 catches.

After graduating, Villalobos spent one year without playing football until 2016, when he was selected by the Eagles of the newly established Liga de Fútbol Americano Profesional (LFA).

== Professional career ==
Villalobos played in the inaugural LFA season for the Eagles, later rebranded as Mexicas, and stayed there for four seasons. His highlights include winning one championship with the team, and the MVP, at Tazón México III, and winning the 2019 award for Best Receiver.

In 2019, Villalobos was selected as the 11th pick of the 2019 CFL-LFA Draft by the Ottawa Redblacks. After going through medical checks, Villalobos joined the team in May 2019.

On July 24, 2019, Villalobos was promoted to the Redblacks' active roster, and made his CFL debut the following day against the Calgary Stampeders. In August, he landed in the team's practice roster. And on September 12, 2019, he made it again to the active roster. In total, he dressed in eight regular season games in 2019. He re-signed with the Redblacks on January 13, 2021. Villalobos was released by the Redblacks in September 2021.

Villalobos was signed by the Mexicas for the 2022 LFA season.

== National team career ==
Villalobos represents the Mexico national flag football team in international competition. He helped Mexico win the bronze medal at the 2022 World Games in Birmingham, Alabama, catching a touchdown pass in their 39–35 win over Austria in the bronze medal game. Villalobos later helped Mexico win the silver medal at the 2023 IFAF Americas Continental Championships in Charlotte, North Carolina, catching a touchdown pass in their 40–36 loss to the United States in the gold medal game.
