= Tazón México =

Annual championship game of the Liga de Fútbol Americano Profesional

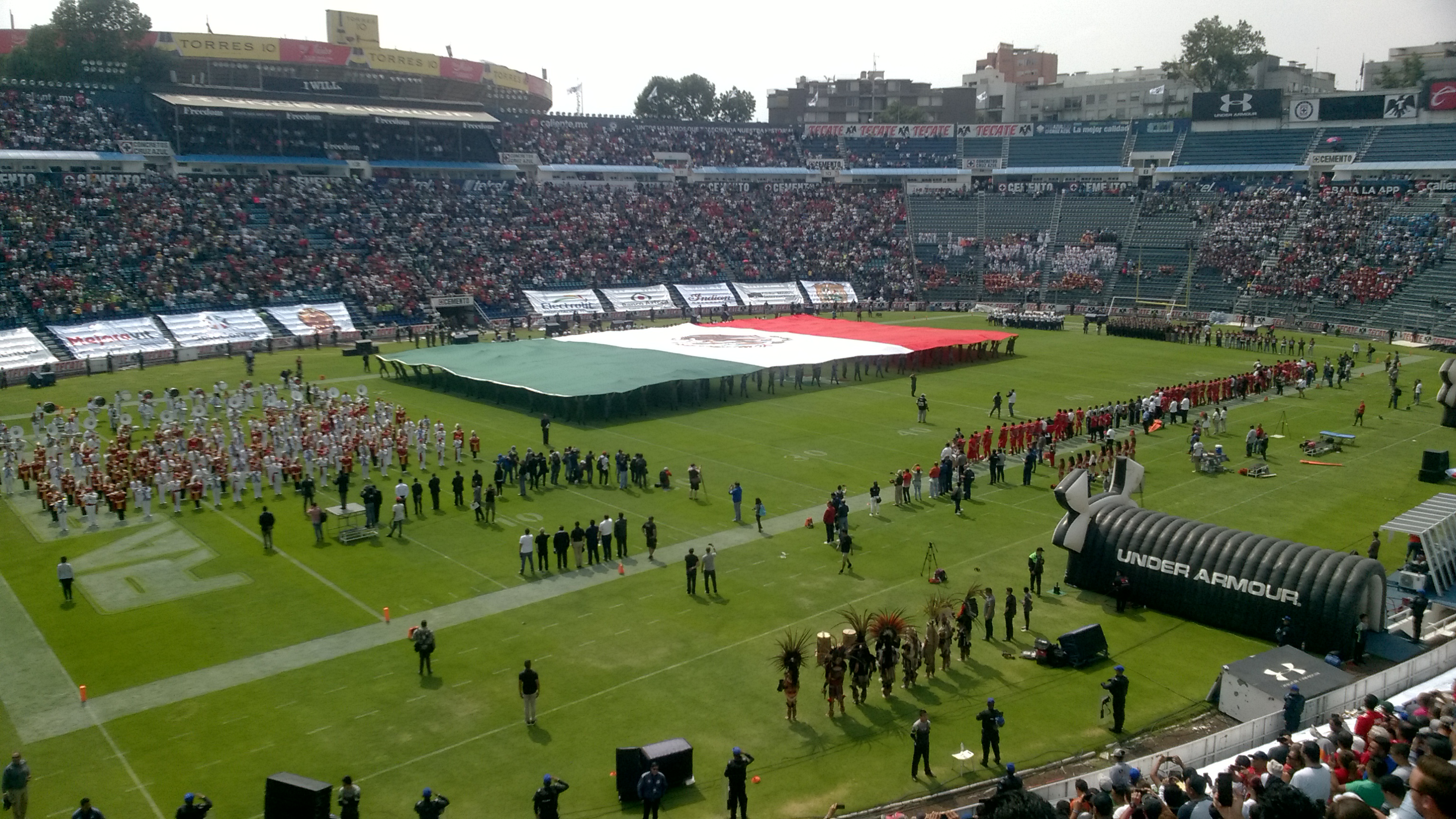
Anthem ceremony at Tazón México III

The Tazón México (English: Mexico Bowl) is the annual championship game of the Liga de Fútbol Americano Profesional, the highest level of professional American football in Mexico. As with the Super Bowl, Roman numerals are used to identify each game, rather than the year in which it is held. The game was typically played on the last Sunday of April, but it is currently held on the second Saturday of July.

== History ==
The LFA held the first two Tazón México games at Estadio Jesús Martínez "Palillo" in the Magdalena Mixhuca Sports City in Mexico City in 2016 and 2017. The Mayas won those first two Tazón México games, the most of any team. The venue was changed for the 2018 season and Tazón México III was held at Estadio Azul, originally used for football and which has a larger capacity. The Mexicas would win their first title in front of 15,000 spectators, less than half of the venue's capacity. Tazón México IV was also held at Estadio Azul, with the attendance increasing slightly from the previous year to 18,000.

In December 2019, it was announced that the game would change its venue from Estadio Azul to Estadio Azteca to host Tazón México V, the 2020 season championship game. But due to the COVID-19 pandemic, the 2020 LFA season was cancelled (along with the 2021 season) and Tazón México V was not played. In May 2022, the Tazón México was held outside of Mexico City for the first time. Tazón México V was played in Tijuana at Estadio Caliente. The Fundidores defeated Gallos Negros 18–14 to win their first title.

== Tazón México VI ==
The duel took place on June 10 in the finale of the sixth season.

The sixth edition of the Mexico Bowl had an official venue for the culmination of the 2023 season of the Professional American Football League (LFA). For the second consecutive year, the game did not take place in Mexico City and was held in the northern part of the country.

LFA Commissioner Alejandro Jaimes announced that the Olympic Stadium of the Autonomous University of Chihuahua (UACH) would be the venue for Mexico Bowl VI on Saturday, June 10, marking the end of the sixth season of the League.

The stadium, with a capacity of 23,000 spectators, is the home of the UACH Eagles and is also the home of the Chihuahua Caudillos, a team that joined the LFA in 2023 following the disintegration of the Mexican American Football (FAM).

Since its appearance in the now-defunct league, the Caudillos team has managed to attract crowds to their stadium, boasting the best attendance in that circuit. Jaimes revealed that they were planning a complete experience, similar to American football in the United States, with food in the parking lot and various activities.

== Results ==
| Game | Date | Winner | Score | Runner-up | MVP^ | Venue | City | Attendance |
|---|---|---|---|---|---|---|---|---|
| I | 10 April 2016 | Mayas | 29–13 | Raptors | Josué Martínez, WR | Estadio Jesús Martínez "Palillo" | Mexico City | 3,000 |
| II | 30 April 2017 | Mayas | 24–18 | Dinos | Marco García, QB | Estadio Jesús Martínez "Palillo" | Mexico City | 3,000 |
| III | 22 April 2018 | Mexicas | 17–0 | Raptors | Guillermo Villalobos, WR | Estadio Azul | Mexico City | 15,000 |
| IV | 12 May 2019 | Condors | 20–16 | Raptors | Diego Pérez Arvizu, QB | Estadio Azul | Mexico City | 18,000 |
| V | 21 May 2022 | Fundidores | 18–14 | Gallos Negros | Martín Maldonado, DL | Estadio Caliente | Tijuana | 14,000 |
| VI | 10 June 2023 | Caudillos | 10–0 | Dinos | Octavio González, DE | Estadio Olímpico Universitario José Reyes Baeza | Chihuahua City | 18,930 |
| VII | 8 June 2024 | Caudillos | 34–14 | Raptors | Jeremy Johnson, QB | Estadio Corregidora | Querétaro City | 10,000 |
| VIII | 12 July 2025 | Mexicas | 13–12 | Osos | Colby Campbell, LB | Estadio Universitario BUAP | Puebla | 18,000 |
| IX | 7 June 2026 | Caudillos | 24–12 | Osos | Dishon McNairy, DB | Estadio Olímpico Universitario José Reyes Baeza | Chihuahua City | 18,930 |

^ All MVP's are from the winning team, unless otherwise noted.

== Appearances by team ==
| Team | Wins | Losses | Winning percentage | Appearances | Seasons (Champions in bold) |
|---|---|---|---|---|---|
| Caudillos | 3 | 0 | 1.000 | 3 | **2023, 2024, 2026** |
| Mayas | 2 | 0 | 1.000 | 2 | **2016, 2017** |
| Mexicas | 2 | 0 | 1.000 | 2 | **2018, 2025** |
| Condors | 1 | 0 | 1.000 | 1 | **2019** |
| Fundidores/Osos | 1 | 2 | .333 | 3 | **2022**, 2025, 2026 |
| Raptors | 0 | 4 | .000 | 4 | 2016, 2018, 2019, 2024 |
| Dinos | 0 | 2 | .000 | 2 | 2017, 2023 |
| Gallos Negros | 0 | 1 | .000 | 1 | 2022 |

== Records ==
- Most Tazón México Bowl wins: 3, Caudillos (VI, VII, IX)
- Most Tazón México Bowl Appearances: 4, Raptors (I, III, lV, VII)
- Most Points Scored Combined: 48 (VII)
- Most Points Scored by Team: 34, Caudillos (VII)
- Coach with the most victories: 2, Ernesto Alfaro (Mayas)
- Most Touchdown Passes: 2, QB Marco García (I)
- Most Rushing Touchdowns: 2, RB Omar Cojolum (I)
- Touchdown Catches: 2, WR Josué Martínez (I)
