= 2018 LFA season =

- Duration: 16 February 2018 – 8 April 2018
- North Champions champions: Raptors
- Central Champions champions: Mexicas

Tazón México III
- Date: 22 April 2018
- Venue: Estadio Azul, Mexico City
- Champions: Mexicas

Seasons
- 2017 2019

The 2018 LFA season was the third season of the Liga de Fútbol Americano Profesional (LFA). The season saw all previous teams return with no additional new ones. The Eagles changed their team name to the Mexicas. This would be the first season that saw the championship, the Tazón México held at a neutral site of the Estadio Azul in Mexico City. The league season began on February 16 and concluded on the April 8. The playoffs began on the April 14 and concluded on April 22 with the Mexicas beating the Raptors in Taźon México III.

== Participating teams ==
Team	Head coach	City	Stadium	Capacity
Central Division
Condors	(Mexico) Félix Buendía	Mexico City	Jesús Martínez "Palillo"	6,000
Mayas	(Mexico) Ernesto Alfaro	Mexico City	Jesús Martínez "Palillo"	6,000
Mexicas	(Mexico) Rafael Duk	Mexico City	Jesús Martínez "Palillo"	6,000
North Division
Dinos	(Mexico) Carlos Cabral	Saltillo, Coahuila	Estadio Olímpico de Saltillo	5,900
Fundidores	(Mexico) Israel González	Monterrey, Nuevo León	Estadio Nuevo León Unido	1,500
Raptors	(Mexico) Guillermo Gutiérrez	Naucalpan, Estado de México	José Ortega Martínez	3,700

== Preseason events ==
=== Relevant events ===
On October 28, 2017, Mr. Juan Carlos Vázquez left the presidency of the LFA; the figure of President was eliminated and the figure of the Commissioner was created, which Guillermo Ruiz Burguete occupied.

On January 16, LFA commissioner Guillermo Ruiz Burguete resigned; the league did not announce his replacement. For operational purposes, the activities of the commissioner were absorbed by the president of the league's board of directors, Óscar Pérez.

On March 3, the players of the Mexicas team went on strike due to the lack of medical insurance and other supplies necessary for the professional practice of the sport, so their game for week 3 against Dinos was suspended.

On March 8, the Mexicas team was fined $657,820.00 MXN(US35,200) for damages caused to the League, its TV partners, its press partners, the Dinos team, and fans attending the stadium for not having presented to play. It was also determined that said party would not be rescheduled and therefore Mexicas would lose it by forfeit.

The salary cap was 1,100,000MXN(US59,000)

=== Coaching changes ===
The 2018 season saw all but Mayas replace their head coach

Condors: Enrique Zapata was replaced as head coach by Felix Buendía after a 3–4 season

Mexicas: José Campuzano was replaced as head coach by Rafael Duk, who coached the Raptors the previous two seasons, after a 4–3 season.

Raptors: Rafael Duk was replaced as head coach by Guillermo Gutierrez after a 5–2 season.

Dinos: Guillermo Ruiz was replaced as head coach by Carlos Cabral after a 2–5 season.

Fundidores: Leopoldo Treviño was replaced as head coach by Israel Gonzalez after a 2–5 season.

=== Draft ===
On January 13, the 2018 Draft was held in which 47 players were selected who finished their eligibility in Mexican university football

Draft 2018
Rd	Sel.	LFA Team	Player	Pos.	University	Conf.
1	1	Condors	Luis Humberto Lopez Tinoco	RB	Águilas Blancas IPN	Liga Mayor ONEFA
1	2	Mexicas	Mauricio Jacob Vargas Hernandez	OL	Potros Salvajes UAEM	Liga Mayor ONEFA
1	3	Condors vía Raptors*	Andrés Salgado Gomez	WR	Pumas CU UNAM	Liga Mayor ONEFA
1	4	Mayas	Gildardo Torres Charco	OT	Pumas CU UNAM	Liga Mayor ONEFA
1	5	Fundidores	Ivan Sergio Barragán Leal	OL	Auténticos Tigres UANL	Liga Mayor ONEFA
1	6	Dinos	Jose Michell Lopez Valdez	OL	Auténticos Tigres UANL	Liga Mayor ONEFA
2	7	Condors	Abraham Herrera	OL	Pumas CU UNAM	Liga Mayor ONEFA
2	8	Mexicas	Leonardo Cabrera Mujica	DL	Águilas Blancas IPN	Liga Mayor ONEFA
2	9	Raptors	Emigdio Palacios Alcala	DL	Burros Blancos IPN	Liga Mayor ONEFA
2	10	Mayas	Sebastian Baig Necoechea	DB	Linces UVM	Liga Mayor ONEFA
2	11	Fundidores	Raymundo Vega Ruíz	OL	Auténticos Tigres UANL	Liga Mayor ONEFA
2	12	Dinos	Joaquin Davila Martinez	OL	Auténticos Tigres UANL	Liga Mayor ONEFA
3	13	Condors	Miguel Angel Urzúa Solís	LB	Águilas Blancas IPN	Liga Mayor ONEFA
3	14	Mexicas	José Luis Santana	LB	Águilas Blancas IPN	Liga Mayor ONEFA
3	15	Raptors	Deion Sixto Correa Viazcán	DB	Linces UVM	Liga Mayor ONEFA
3	16	Mayas	Mario Alberto Salas	WR	Borregos Toluca ITESM	Liga Premier CONADEIP
3	17	Fundidores	Christian Alejandro Hernández Delgado	LB	Auténticos Tigres UANL	Liga Mayor ONEFA
3	18	Dinos	Adrián Alejandro Martínez Armendáriz	WR	Auténticos Tigres UANL	Liga Mayor ONEFA
4	19	Condors	Aarón Mendoza Gomez	WR	Borregos México ITESM	Liga Premier CONADEIP
4	20	Mexicas	Carlos Santos Rodriguez	LB	Águilas Blancas IPN	Liga Mayor ONEFA
4	21	Condors vía Raptors*	Ramses Israel Herrera Vega	DB	Centinelas CGP	Liga Mayor ONEFA
4	22	Mayas	Christian Rene Gomez Sanchez	WR	Burros Blancos IPN	Liga Mayor ONEFA
4	23	Fundidores	Edgardo Garza Lerma	OL	Auténticos Tigres UANL	Liga Mayor ONEFA
4	24	Dinos	Cesar Daniel Guzman	LB	Lobos UAdeC	Liga Mayor ONEFA
5	25	Condors	Erick Antonio Alarcon Merino	OL	Águilas Blancas IPN	Liga Mayor ONEFA
5	26	Mexicas	Ditter Emmanuel Smith Espinoza	WR	Burros Blancos IPN	Liga Mayor ONEFA
5	27	Raptors	Ramon Arturo Lopez Zepeda	LB	Potros Salvajes UAEM	Liga Mayor ONEFA
5	28	Mayas	Isaac Abraham Medina Cabrajal	DL	Burros Blancos IPN	Liga Mayor ONEFA
5	29	Fundidores	Jesus Santana Gonzales	WR	Auténticos Tigres UANL	Liga Mayor ONEFA
5	30	Dinos	Mario Alberto Rubio Gonzales	WR	Auténticos Tigres UANL	Liga Mayor ONEFA
6	31	Condors	Alejandro Mujica Soriano	WR	Águilas Blancas IPN	Liga Mayor ONEFA
6	32	Mexicas	Abraham Assennatto Bravo	OL	Burros Blancos IPN	Liga Mayor ONEFA
6	33	Raptors	Carlos Garcia Contreras	DL	Potros Salvajes UAEM	Liga Mayor ONEFA
6	34	Mayas	Omar Mendoza Gomez	WR	Águilas Blancas IPN	Liga Mayor ONEFA
6	35	Fundidores	Aaron Isaac Mendoza Ruiz	WR	Auténticos Tigres UANL	Liga Mayor ONEFA
6	36	Dinos	Genaro Jose Alfonsín Romero	S	Auténticos Tigres UANL	Liga Mayor ONEFA
7	37	Condors	Oscar Jesus Capuchino	OL	Frailes UT	Liga Mayor ONEFA
7	38	Mexicas	Fernando Alvarez Duran	WR	Linces UVM	Liga Mayor ONEFA
7	39	Condors vía Raptors*	Jorge Luis Ortiz Carriño	WR	Pumas Acatlan UNAM	Liga Mayor ONEFA
7	40	Mayas	Declined pick			
7	41	Fundidores	Francisco Javier Garcia Ramirez	CB	Auténticos Tigres UANL	Liga Mayor ONEFA
7	42	Dinos	Francisco De Jesus Mata Charles	QB	Auténticos Tigres UANL	Liga Mayor ONEFA
8	43	Fundidores	Max Ismael Villareal Maldonado	QB	Autenticos Tigres UANL	Liga Mayor ONEFA
8	44	Dinos	Edgar Daniel Razo Cervantes	CB	Auténticos Tigres UANL	Liga Mayor ONEFA
8	45	Fundidores	Daniel Orios	OL	Lobos UAdeC	Liga Mayor ONEFA
8	46	Dinos	Gabriel Tadeo De Hoyos Encinia	WR	Lobos UAdeC	Liga Mayor ONEFA
8	47	Fundidores	Jesus Gerardo Rendon Torres	WR	Lobos UAdeC	Liga Mayor ONEFA

Complementary selections

* In exchange for QB Bruno Márquez (2nd year), Raptors gave Condors selections in the first, fourth and seventh round of the 2018 Draft.

== Season ==
=== Standings ===
Note: GP = Games played, W = Wins, L = Losses, PF = Points for, PA = Points against, Diff=Difference between pts. for and against

Teams highlighted qualified for the playoffs

North Division
Team	GP	W	L	PF	PA	Diff
Dinos	7	4	3	123	167	−44
Raptors	7	3	4	194	174	20
Fundidores	7	2	5	172	189	−17

Central Division
Team	GP	W	L	PF	PA	Diff
Mayas	7	5	2	167	166	1
Mexicas	7	4	3	149	131	18
Condors	7	3	4	212	220	−8

=== Results ===
Week 1
Away	Score	Home	Venue	Date	Kickoff (UTC-6)
Dinos	0–17	Fundidores	Estadio Nuevo León Unido	February 16	19:00
Mexicas	36–19	Condors	Estadio Jesús Martínez "Palillo"	February 18	11:00
Raptors	32–0	Mayas	Estadio Jesús Martínez "Palillo"	February 18	15:00

Week 2
Away	Score	Home	Venue	Date	Kickoff (UTC-6)
Mayas	28–25	Dinos	Olímpico Francisco I. Madero	February 24	15:00
Fundidores	15–44	Mexicas	Estadio Jesús Martínez "Palillo"	February 25	11:00
Raptors	46–26	Condors	Estadio Jesús Martínez "Palillo"	February 25	15:00

Week 3
Away	Score	Home	Venue	Date	Kickoff (UTC-6)
Raptors	15–45	Fundidores	Estadio Nuevo León Unido	March 2	20:00
Mexicas	0–1 *	Dinos	Olímpico Francisco I. Madero	March 3	16:00
Condors	24–33	Mayas	Estadio Jesús Martínez "Palillo"	March 4	12:00

Week 4
Away	Score	Home	Venue	Date	Kickoff (UTC-6)
Mayas	25–14	Fundidores	Estadio Nuevo León Unido	March 9	20:00
Dinos	29–27	Raptors	José Ortega Martínez	March 10	17:00
Condors	23–22	Mexicas	Estadio Jesús Martínez "Palillo"	March 11	12:00

Week 5
Away	Score	Home	Venue	Date	Kickoff (UTC-6)
Fundidores	20–30	Dinos	Olímpico Francisco I. Madero	March 17	16:00
Mexicas	30–20	Raptors	José Ortega Martínez	March 17	17:00
Mayas	28–24	Condors	José Ortega Martínez	March 18	12:00

Week 6
Away	Score	Home	Venue	Date	Kickoff (UTC-5)
Condors	41–40	Fundidores	Estadio Nuevo León Unido	March 23	20:00
Raptors	20–23	Dinos	Olímpico Francisco I. Madero	March 24	16:00
Mayas	34–35	Mexicas	Estadio Jesús Martínez "Palillo"	March 25	12:00

Week 7
Away	Score	Home	Venue	Date	Kickoff (UTC-6)
Fundidores	21–34	Raptors	José Ortega Martínez	April 7	13:00
Dinos	15–55	Condors	Estadio Jesús Martínez "Palillo"	April 8	11:00
Mexicas	12–19	Mayas	Estadio Jesús Martínez "Palillo"	April 8	15:00

* Based on the regulations, the Dinos won the match forfeit with a score of 1 to 0, since Mexicas did not show up for the match.

=== Statistical leaders ===
Category	Player	Position	Team	Statistic
Passing
Yards	Bruno Márquez	QB	Raptors Naucalpan	1,882
Touchdowns	Bruno Márquez	QB	Raptors Naucalpan	17
Completions	Bruno Márquez	QB	Raptors Naucalpan	162
Attempts	Bruno Márquez	QB	Raptors Naucalpan	261
Completion percentage	Bruno Márquez	QB	Raptors Naucalpan	62.07%
Rushing
Yards	Omar Cojolum	RB	Mayas CDMX	404
Touchdowns	Omar Cojolum	RB	Mayas CDMX	9
Attempts	Omar Cojolum	RB	Mayas CDMX	68
Yards per attempt	Gourdinose Terril	RB	Mexicas CDMX	8.3
Receiving
Yards	Andrés Salgado	WR	Condors CDMX	586
Touchdowns	Andrés Salgado	WR	Condors CDMX	11
Receptions	Jose Manuel Barrios Ortega	WR	Raptors Naucalpan	62
Yards per reception	Aaron Isaac Mendoza Ruiz	WR	Fundidores Monterrey	23.91
Defensive
Sacks	Ricardo Yañez Balderas	DL	Dinos Saltillo	6
Tackles	Christian Alejandro Hernández Delgado	LB	Fundidores Monterrey	21
Assisted tackles	Christian Alejandro Hernández Delgado	LB	Fundidores Monterrey	19
Interceptions	Fernando Ramírez Paredes	DB	Raptors Naucalpan	6
Returning
Punt returns	Mauricio Antonio Jordán Valdes	WR	Mexicas CDMX	15
Punt return yards	Joan Medinosa Tabitas	RB	Dinos Saltillo	158
Kickoff returns	Luis Humberto López Tinco	RB	Condors CDMX	17
Kickoff return yards	Luis Humberto López Tinco	RB	Condors CDMX	385
Source: LFA

== Playoffs ==
=== Playoff bracket ===
Division Finals
C2	Mexicas	27
C1	Mayas	17
N2	Raptors	21
N1	Dinos	6

Tazón Mexico III
C1	Mexicas	17
N1	Raptors	0

== Tazón México III ==
Tazón México III

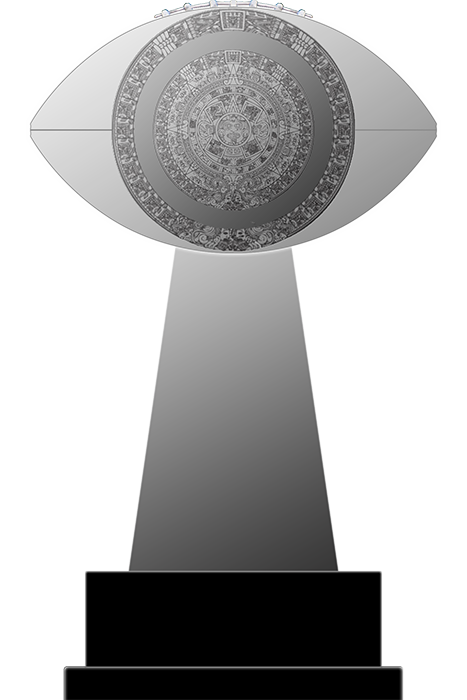

Raptors
vs
Mexicas
(3–4)

(4–3)
0

17
Head Coach:

Head Coach:
Guillermo Gutierrez

Rafael Duk

Teams	1C	2C	3C	4C
Raptors	0	0	0	0
Mexicas	3	14	0	0

Date: 22, April 2018
Kickoff time: 4 p.m.
Weather: Cloudy, 19°
Stadium: Estadio Azul
Attendance: 15,000
MVP: Guillermo Villalobos, WR
Referee: Juan José Arce
TV:
← II • Tazón México • IV →

The Tazón México III was held on April 22, 2018, at 4:00 p.m. at the Estadio Azul in Mexico City, with a record attendance for the LFA of 15,000 fans present. Mexicas defeated Raptors 17–0 in a defensive game. This would have been the first LFA championship with a halftime show, however, the group in charge of the show, Panteón Rococó, had to cancel last-minute performance due to Civil Protection recommendations due to the probability of a thunderstorm.

The final between Raptors and Mexicas would have been the last professional activity that the Estadio Azul before its demolition, however, the venue will house more games of the LFA, including the Tazón México IV, since its demolition was postponed to the 2020 year. The MVP of the game was Guillermo Villalobos.

Quarter	Time	Series			Team	Annotations	Score	
Quarter	Time	Plays	Yds	TOP	Team	Annotations	RAP	MEX
1	2:10	17	65	7:59	MEX	Field goal, 28 yards from K Carlos Soria	0	3
2	3:56	10	80	4:49	MEX	Touchdown, 40-yard pass from QB Ricardo Quintana to WR Guillermo Villalobos; the extra point is good (K Carlos Soria))	0	10
2	0:16	9	89	1:48	MEX	Touchdown, 10-yard pass from QB Ricardo Quintana to WR Guillermo Villalobos; the extra point is good (K Carlos Soria)	0	17
