= Estadio Jesús Martínez "Palillo" =

Multi-use stadium in the Magdalena Mixhuca Sports City in Mexico City

Coordinates: 19°24′28″N 99°05′42″W

- El Palillo
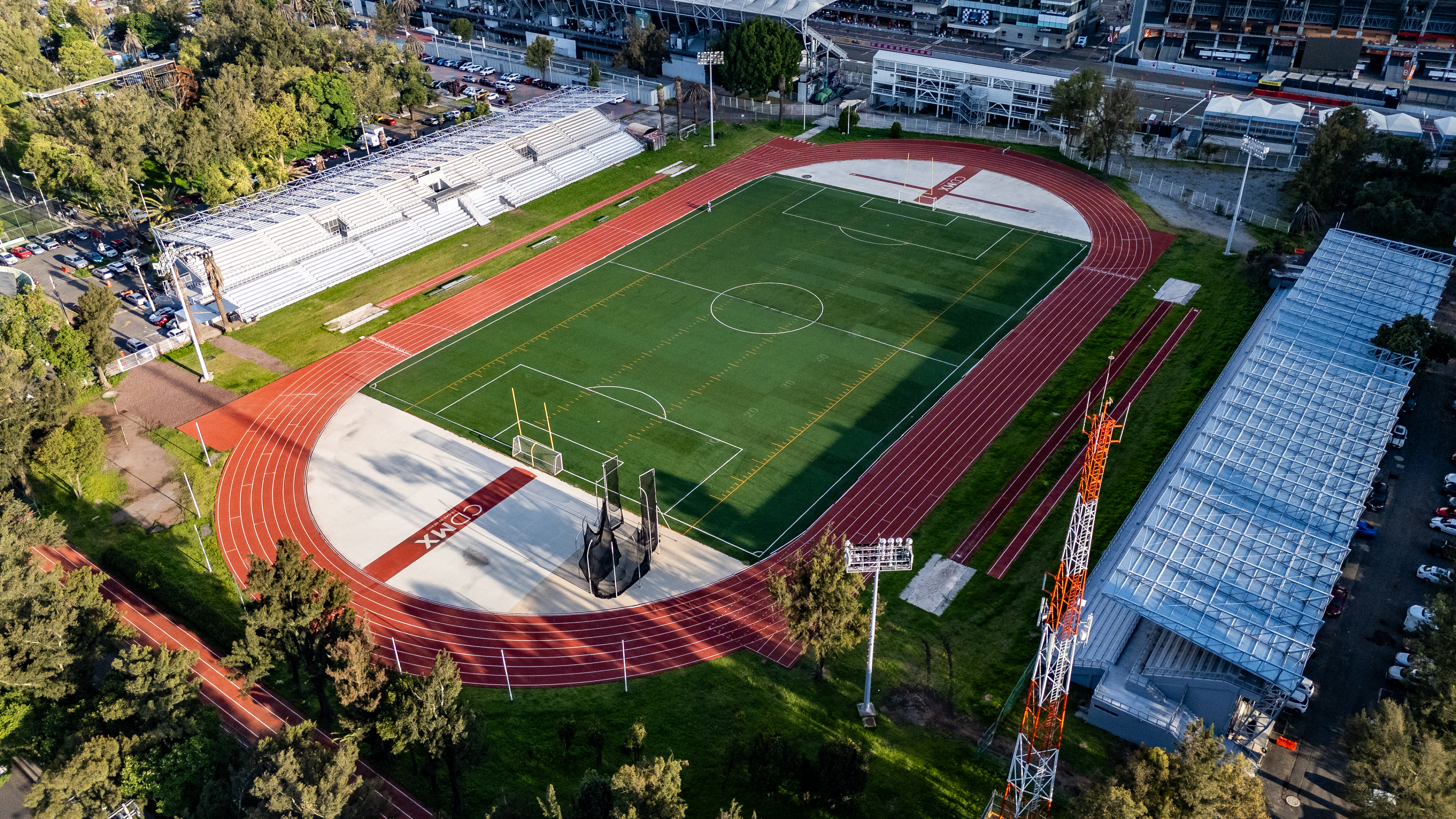
- Interactive map of Estadio Jesús Martínez "Palillo"
- Former names: Estadio Municipal (1964–1983)
- Location: Magdalena Mixhuca Sports City, Iztacalco, Mexico City
- Owner: Government of Mexico City
- Operator: Government of Mexico City
- Capacity: 6,000
- Public transit: Ciudad Deportiva

Construction
- Opened: 1964

Tenants
- Current tenants Mexicas (LFA) (2016–2018; 2022–present); Past tenants Condors (LFA) (2016–2018); Mayas (LFA) (2016–2018); Raptors (LFA) (2016–2017); Atlético Capitalino (LBM) (2020); Reds (FAM) (2020, 2022); Guerreros de Xico (Serie B) (2021–2022); Leviatán (Serie A) (2021, 2022–2023); Muxes (Liga TDP) (2021, 2022–2023); Chilangos (Serie B) (2023–2024); Neza (LBM) (2023–2024); RED (LBM) (2023–2024)

The Estadio Jesús Martínez "Palillo" is a multi-use stadium located in the Magdalena Mixhuca Sports City in Mexico City. It is currently the home of the Mexicas of the Liga de Fútbol Americano Profesional (LFA), Chilangos F.C. of the Serie B de México, Neza and Proyecto RED of the Liga de Balompié Mexicano. The stadium has a capacity of 6,000 seated spectators.

== History ==
The Estadio Municipal (Municipal Stadium) opened in 1964. In 1983, it was named after Mexican actor and comedian Jesús Martínez "Palillo" in recognition of his contributions to the original construction of the Sports City. The stadium was remodeled in 2014 at a cost of 25 million pesos, its first major maintenance in 15 years.

The track bears an IAAF Class 2 designation, one of three such tracks in Mexico City, allowing it to be used for a variety of international events. Among the international events held at the stadium was the 2018 World Modern Pentathlon Championships, held in Mexico City to mark the 50th anniversary of the Olympic Games.

== Uses ==
=== 1968 Summer Olympics ===
The Estadio Municipal, as well as two adjoining fields in the Sports City, hosted the field hockey competitions of the 1968 Summer Olympics. For the Games, the 6,160-seat capacity of the roofed grandstands was augmented by additional temporary stands, with approximately 1,200 seats, installed in the end zones. Rest areas for athletes, dressing rooms, showers and a cafeteria were located in a building adjacent to the stadium. The playing field was conditioned in accordance with the regulations of the International Hockey Federation.

=== Football ===
In 2014 it was chosen as the field of the Ángeles de la Ciudad F.C., owned by the Government of Mexico City, until 2016 the team remained in this stadium. In 2020, Atlético Capitalino, that plays in the Liga de Balompié Mexicano, chose it as the venue for its matches after not being able to get the use of the Estadio Ciudad de los Deportes, so football became the stadium's main sport. In 2021 the stadium became the field of the teams Guerreros de Xico, Leviatán F.C. and C.D. Muxes, however those clubs left the stadium in 2022 and 2023 respectively.

In August 2023 the stadium became the field of Chilangos F.C. of the Liga Premier – Serie B, in addition to Neza and Proyecto RED, clubs of the Liga de Balompié Mexicano.

=== American football ===
From 2016 to 2018, the stadium was home several teams of the Liga de Fútbol Americano Profesional. Initially, all of the league's Mexico City-based teams, including the Raptors and Mexicas, used the venue until relocating to other sports facilities in the Mexico City area. In the 2018 season, the Raptors were the first Mexico City-based squad to move out when they made the Estadio José Ortega Martínez in Naucalpan, State of Mexico, their home, while the Mexicas announced that they would move to the Estadio Wilfrido Massieu in 2019.

In 2022, Mexicas returned to the "Palillo" Martínez stadium for the 2022 LFA season.

For the 2023 LFA season, the Rojos de la Ciudad de México will play in the stadium.

=== Non-sports ===
One of the stages of the annual Vive Latino festival, which is primarily held in the Sports City's Foro Sol, is set up on the field at the stadium.

In late 2018, the stadium was used by Mexico City's government as a shelter for migrants traveling in the late 2018 migrant caravan from Central America. In preparation for the arrival of migrants, the field was covered, kitchen facilities prepared and tanks with a capacity of 10,000 liters of drinking water were put in place. The shelter will have a capacity of 6,500 when all preparations are complete.
