= 2019 LFA season =

- Duration: 22 February 2019 – 14 April 2019
- North Champions champions: Raptors
- Central Champions champions: Condors

Tazón México IV
- Date: 12 May 2019
- Venue: Estadio Azul, Mexico City
- Champions: Condors

Seasons
- 2018 2020

The 2019 LFA season was the fourth season of the Liga de Fútbol Americano Profesional (LFA), the top American football league in Mexico. The regular season began on February 22 and concluded on April 14. The playoffs commenced on April 26 and concluded on May 12 with the Condors defeating the Raptors to win the Tazón México IV.

== Preseason events ==
=== Expansion and stadium changes ===
Two new teams joined the league for the 2019 season: Artilleros Puebla, based in Puebla, and Osos Toluca, based in Toluca, State of Mexico. This expansion raises the number of teams in the league to eight.

During the first LFA season, the Estadio Jesús Martínez "Palillo" hosted all the league's teams. Nevertheless, 2019 will be the first season in which none of the teams would play there, due to the fact that the stadium is now working as shelter for Central American migrants.

- Condors was supposed to be the only team playing at the Estadio Jesús Martínez "Palillo", but moved to the ITESM Santa Fe stadium in the district of Santa Fe after Mexico City's government designed the "Palillo" Martínez stadium as a temporary shelter for Central American migrants.
- Mayas moved from the "Palillo" Martínez to the Estadio Wilfrido Massieu, which is regularly used by the Instituto Politécnico Nacional Águilas Blancas college football team.
- Mexicas also moved from the Estadio Jesús Martínez "Palillo" to the Casco de Santo Tomás, the training ground of the Instituto Politécnico Nacional football teams.
- Raptors moved from the Estadio José Ortega Martínez to the field of the National Autonomous University of Mexico Acatlán campus.

=== Draft ===
The 2019 Draft was regional, that is, each team chose players graduated from universities in their region. In the case of Artilleros de Puebla and Osos de Toluca, being the only teams in their region, they had no competition in their player selections. The Draft was held on January 12 at the FES Acatlán facilities. There were nine rounds, 6 normal and 3 complementary. The selections were as follows:

Draft 2019
Rd	Sel.	LFA Team	Player	Pos.	University	Conf.
1	1	Fundidores	Maximiliano Soto	DL	Borregos Salvajes ITESM	Liga Premier CONADEIP
1	2	Condors	* Aldo Alejandro Narváez	WR	Águilas Blancas IPN	Liga Mayor ONEFA
1	3	Dinos	Víctor Alejandro Sánchez	LB	Auténticos Tigres UANL	Liga Mayor ONEFA
1	4	Mayas	Jesús Augusto Sosa	RB	Burros Blancos IPN	Liga Mayor ONEFA
1	5	Raptors	José David Casarrubias	DL	Leones UA Norte	Liga Mayor ONEFA
1	6	Mexicas	José Ulises Espinosa	DL	Águilas Blancas IPN	Liga Mayor ONEFA
1	7	Artilleros	Carlos Sebastián Olvera	WR	Aztecas UDLAP	Liga Premier CONADEIP
1	8	Osos	Enrique Gerardo Yenny	K	Borregos ITESM Toluca	Liga Premier CONADEIP
2	9	Fundidores	Uriel Martínez	DL	Auténticos Tigres UANL	Liga Mayor ONEFA
2	10	Condors	César Torres	DB	Leones UA Norte	Liga Mayor ONEFA
2	11	Dinos	Jesús Gerardo Rendón	WR	Lobos UAdeC	Liga Mayor ONEFA
2	12	Mayas	Luis Fernando Zárate	LB	Burros Blancos IPN	Liga Mayor ONEFA
2	13	Raptors	Topilitzin Silva	LB	Leones UA Norte	Liga Mayor ONEFA
2	14	Mexicas	Emmanuel Carpio	DL	Toros Salvajes UACH	Liga Mayor ONEFA
2	15	Artilleros	Juan Manuel Márquez	DB	Aztecas UDLAP	Liga Premier CONADEIP
2	16	Osos	Ulises Alberto Garduño	LB	Potros Salvajes UAEM	Liga Mayor ONEFA
3	17	Fundidores	Jesús David Alanís	DL	Lobos UAdeC	Liga Mayor ONEFA
3	18	Condors	Irwin Heriberto Zuviri	DL	Águilas Blancas IPN	Liga Mayor ONEFA
3	19	Dinos	Erick Cázares	DB	Auténticos Tigres UANL	Liga Mayor ONEFA
3	20	Mayas	Jair Alonso Juárez	DL	Leones UA Norte	Liga Mayor ONEFA
3	21	Raptors	Alejandro Arce	QB	Leones UA Norte	Liga Mayor ONEFA
3	22	Mexicas	Oscar Lenard Vara	LB	Centinelas CGP	Liga Mayor ONEFA
3	23	Artilleros	Alan Eduardo Méndez	LB	Aztecas UDLAP	Liga Premier CONADEIP
3	24	Osos	Daniel Becerril	WR	Potros Salvajes UAEM	Liga Mayor ONEFA
4	25	Fundidores	Rubén Martínez	RB	Auténticos Tigres UANL	Liga Mayor ONEFA
4	26	Condors	Rafael Adrián Gómez	WR	Burros Blancos IPN	Liga Mayor ONEFA
4	27	Dinos	Yael de Jesús Romero	WR	Lobos UAdeC	Liga Mayor ONEFA
4	28	Mayas	Marco Antonio Morales	WR	Burros Blancos IPN	Liga Mayor ONEFA
4	29	Raptors	Oscar Daniel Larios	RB	Leones UA Norte	Liga Mayor ONEFA
4	30	Mexicas	Edgar Ángeles Castañeda	LB	Frailes UT	Liga Mayor ONEFA
4	31	Artilleros	Juan Manuel Gray	OL	Aztecas UDLAP	Liga Premier CONADEIP
4	32	Osos	Jesús Eduardo Estrada	DL	Potros Salvajes UAEM	Liga Mayor ONEFA
5	33	Fundidores	Carlos Alberto Díaz	DB	Auténticos Tigres UANL	Liga Mayor ONEFA
5	34	Condors	Rodrigo Omar Garfias	DB	Centinelas CGP	Liga Mayor ONEFA
5	35	Dinos	Luis Eduardo Mireles	TE	Correcaminos UAT	Liga Mayor ONEFA
5	36	Mayas	Juan Salvador Vázquez	DB	Toros Salvajes UACH	Liga Mayor ONEFA
5	37	Raptors	Andrés Aguilar	RB	Pumas UNAM Acatlán	Liga Mayor ONEFA
5	38	Mexicas	Sergio Enrique Martínez	QB	Pumas UNAM Acatlán	Liga Mayor ONEFA
5	39	Artilleros	Anwar de Jesús Ramírez	RB	Borregos ITESM Puebla	Liga Premier CONADEIP
5	40	Osos	Elías González	OL	Potros Salvajes UAEM	Liga Mayor ONEFA
6	41	Fundidores	Alejandro Emmanuel Palomo	DL	Corecaminos UAT Norte	Liga Mayor ONEFA
6	42	Condors	Omar Torres Valle	WR	Centinelas CGP	Liga Mayor ONEFA
6	43	Dinos	Adrián Azahel García	DL	Correcaminos UAT	Liga Mayor ONEFA
6	44	Mayas	Enrique Hernán Benavides	QB	Pumas UNAM Acatlán	Liga Mayor ONEFA
6	45	Raptors	Ian Uriel Mompala	DB	Centinelas CGP	Liga Mayor ONEFA
6	46	Mexicas	Manuel Ignacio Martínez	WR	Águilas Blancas IPN	Liga Mayor ONEFA
6	47	Artilleros	Manuel Eduardo Hernández	DB	Aztecas UDLAP	Liga Premier CONADEIP
6	48	Osos	Rodrigo García	OL	Potros Salvajes UAEM	Liga Mayor ONEFA
7	49	Fundidores	Osvaldo Sánchez	DL	Corecaminos UAT Norte	Liga Mayor ONEFA
7	50	Condors	Diego Carsolio	K	Leones UA Norte	Liga Mayor ONEFA
7	51	Dinos	Hermillo Jesús Corral	DL	Corecaminos UAT Norte	Liga Mayor ONEFA
7	52	Mayas	Carlos Missael Mansilla	OL	Toros Salvajes UACH	Liga Mayor ONEFA
7	53	Raptors	Víctor Francisco Fosado	WR	Pumas UNAM Acatlán	Liga Mayor ONEFA
7	54	Mexicas	Ángel Alexis González	DL	Frailes UT	Liga Mayor ONEFA
7	55	Artilleros	Andrés Fernández	OL	Lobos BUAP	Liga Mayor ONEFA
7	56	Osos	Mario Alberto González	WR	Potros Salvajes UAEM	Liga Mayor ONEFA
8	57	Fundidores	Roberto Alejandro Avilán	RB	Corecaminos UAT Norte	Liga Mayor ONEFA
8	58	Condors	Pedro Arturo Martell	OL	Frailes UT	Liga Mayor ONEFA
8	59	Mayas	Luis David Martínez	WR	Burros Blancos IPN	Liga Mayor ONEFA
8	60	Raptors	Samuel Hazel González	RB	Centinelas CGP	Liga Mayor ONEFA
8	61	Mexicas	Jesús Flores	WR	Pumas UNAM Acatlán	Liga Mayor ONEFA
8	62	Artilleros	Guillermo Calderón	DL	Aztecas UDLAP	Liga Premier CONADEIP
9	63	Mayas	Jesús Ramsés Guerrero	OL	Leones UA Norte	Liga Mayor ONEFA
9	64	Artilleros	Gabriel Amavizca	K	Lobos BUAP	Liga Mayor ONEFA
9	65	Artilleros	Mauricio Francisco Valverde	RB	Borregos ITESM Puebla	Liga Premier CONADEIP
9	66	Artilleros	José Irvin Nuñez	OL	Lobos BUAP	Liga Mayor ONEFA

Complementary selections, teams are not required to make a selection

* Not signed with Condors but with Mexicas.

=== CFL–LFA draft ===
In November 2018, the LFA signed a non-binding Letter of Intent with the CFL to share resources and to allow for at least one CFL game to be played in Mexico, as well as lay the ground work for special Mexican-specific editions of the CFL Combine and CFL draft.

On January 11, 2019, 51 players from the LFA and Mexican college ranks were announced as participants in a combine to beheld on January 13 and a 27-player draft to be held on January 14, 2019. Each CFL team sent scouts and were reported to likely receive four picks.

27 players were chosen from an invited pool of 51 Mexican players: 34 from the LFA and 17 seniors from Mexican university teams.

== Teams ==
Team	City	Stadium	Capacity	Head coach
North Division
Dinos	Saltillo, Coahuila	Estadio Olímpico Francisco I. Madero	8,000	(Mexico) Javier Adame
Fundidores	Monterrey, Nuevo León	Estadio Nuevo León Unido	1,500	(Mexico) Israel González
Osos	Toluca, State of Mexico	Universidad Siglo XXI	4,000	(Mexico) Horacio García Aponte
Raptors	Naucalpan, State of Mexico	FES Acatlán	3,000	(Mexico) Guillermo Gutiérrez
Central Division
Artilleros	Puebla City, Puebla	Estadio Templo del Dolor	4,500	(Mexico) Gustavo Torres
Condors	Mexico City	ITESM Santa Fe	2,000	(Mexico) Félix Buendía
Mayas	Mexico City	Estadio Wilfrido Massieu	13,000	(Mexico) Francisco Chaparro
Mexicas	Mexico City	Casco de Santo Tomás	2,000	(Mexico) Enrique Zárate

== Regular season ==
=== Standings ===
Note: GP = Games played, W = Wins, L = Losses, PF = Points for, PA = Points against

North Division
Team	GP	W	L	PF	PA	Div	Stk
Raptors	8	6	2	210	118	5–1	W4
Fundidores	8	3	5	134	133	3–3	W1
Dinos	8	3	5	110	125	2–4	L2
Osos	8	2	6	116	226	2–4	L1

Central Division
Team	GP	W	L	PF	PA	Div	Stk
Condors	8	6	2	205	150	4–2	W1
Mayas	8	5	3	130	129	4–2	W2
Artilleros	8	5	3	145	131	3–3	L1
Mexicas	8	2	6	132	170	1–5	L4

=== Results ===
Week 1
Away	Score	Home	Venue	Date	Kickoff (UTC-6)	Streaming
Dinos	13–26	Fundidores	Estadio Nuevo León Unido	February 22	21:00	LFA
Osos	12–48	Raptors	FES Acatlán	February 23	16:00	LFA
Condors	21–13	Mayas	Estadio Azul	February 24	12:00	
Artilleros	29–12	Mexicas	Estadio Azul	February 24	16:00	LFA

Week 2
Away	Score	Home	Venue	Date	Kickoff (UTC-6)	Streaming
Fundidores	29–30	Osos	Universidad Siglo XXI	March 2	13:00	LFA
Raptors	21–7	Dinos	Estadio Olímpico Francisco I. Madero	March 2	18:00	LFA
Mexicas	3–13	Mayas	Estadio Wilfrido Massieu	March 3	12:00	
Condors	22–15	Artilleros	Estadio Templo del Dolor	March 3	15:00	LFA

Week 3
Away	Score	Home	Venue	Date	Kickoff (UTC-6)	Streaming
Raptors	21–31	Fundidores	Estadio Nuevo León Unido	March 8	21:00	LFA
Dinos	22–10	Osos	Universidad Siglo XXI	March 10	12:00	
Mexicas	22–18	Condors	ITESM Santa Fe	March 10	15:00	LFA
Artilleros	7–14	Mayas	Estadio Wilfrido Massieu	March 10	15:00	LFA

Week 4
Away	Score	Home	Venue	Date	Kickoff (UTC-6)	Streaming
Osos	6–17	Artilleros	Estadio Templo del Dolor	March 16	15:00	LFA
Dinos	13–16	Mayas	Estadio Wilfrido Massieu	March 17	12:00	LFA
Fundidores	13–15	Condors	Campo ITESM Santa Fe	March 17	12:00	
Raptors	23–29	Mexicas	Casco de Santo Tomás	March 17	15:00	LFA

Week 5
Away	Score	Home	Venue	Date	Kickoff (UTC-6)	Streaming
Fundidores	0–8	Dinos	Estadio Olímpico Francisco I. Madero	March 23	18:00	LFA
Mayas	13–20	Raptors	FES Acatlán	March 24	12:00	
Mexicas	20–21	Artilleros	Estadio Templo del Dolor	March 24	12:00	LFA
Condors	54–30	Osos	Campo Universidad Siglo XXI	March 24	15:00	LFA

Week 6
Away	Score	Home	Venue	Date	Kickoff (UTC-6)	Streaming
Artilleros	7–6	Fundidores	Estadio Nuevo León Unido	March 29	21:00	LFA
Raptors	28–6	Osos	Universidad Siglo XXI	March 30	13:00	LFA
Mexicas	20–28	Dinos	Estadio Olímpico Francisco I. Madero	March 30	18:00	LFA
Mayas	14–33	Condors	ITESM Santa Fe	March 31	12:00	

Week 7
Away	Score	Home	Venue	Date	Kickoff (UTC-5)	Streaming
Osos	13–12	Dinos	Estadio Olímpico Francisco I. Madero	April 6	18:00	LFA
Mayas	22–12	Mexicas	Casco de Santo Tomás	April 7	12:00	
Fundidores	13–30	Raptors	FES Acatlán	April 7	12:00	LFA
Artilleros	29–26	Condors	Campo ITESM Santa Fe	April 7	15:00	LFA

Week 8
Away	Score	Home	Venue	Date	Kickoff (UTC-5)	Streaming
Osos	9–16	Fundidores	Estadio Nuevo León Unido	April 12	21:00	LFA
Dinos	7–19	Raptors	FES Acatlán	April 13	16:00	LFA
Condors	16–14	Mexicas	Casco de Santo Tomás	April 14	12:00	
Mayas	25–20	Artilleros	Estadio Templo del Dolor	April 14	15:00	LFA

=== Statistical leaders ===
Category	Player	Position	Team	Statistic
Passing
Yards	Bruno Márquez	QB	Raptors de Naucalpan	2,344
Touchdowns	Bruno Márquez	QB	Raptors de Naucalpan	18
Interceptions	Ricardo Quintana; Diego Pérez Arvizu; Alvaro Camacho	QB; QB; QB	Mexicas de la Ciudad de México; Condors CDMX; Mayas CDMX	8
Completions	Bruno Márquez	QB	Raptors de Naucalpan	192
Attempts	Bruno Márquez	QB	Raptors de Naucalpan	313
Completion percentage	José Manuel Fernández Chávez	QB	Osos de Toluca	100.00% (Note: Fernández completed 1–1 pass for 100.00% pass completion; taking into account quarterbacks with a minimum of 80 pass attempts during the season (10 per game), Bruno Márquez of the Raptors de Naucalpan led with a pass completion percentage of 61.34%.)
Rushing
Yards	Luis Humberto Lopez Tinoco	RB	Condors CDMX	504
Touchdowns	Dan Ávilla	RB / WR	Raptors de Naucalpan	5
Attempts	Dan Ávila	RB / WR	Raptors de Naucalpan	97
Yards per attempt	Fernando Richarte	WR	Dinos de Saltillo	21.0 (Note: Richarte averaged 21.0 rushing yards on 1 rush attempt; taking into account players with a minimum of 8 rush attempts during the season (1 per game), Joel Ramon Rodriguez Fernandez of the Fundidores de Monterrey led with an average 9.5 rushing yards on 13 rush attempts.)
Receiving
Yards	Guillermo Villalobos	WR	Mexicas de la Ciudad de México	921
Touchdowns	Sebastián Olvera	WR	Artilleros de Puebla	8
Receptions	Guillermo Villalobos	WR	Mexicas de la Ciudad de México	58
Targets	Guillermo Villalobos	WR	Mexicas de la Ciudad de México	88
Yards per reception	Marcelo Zumalacárregui Taboada	WR	Artilleros de Puebla	32.0 (Note: Zumalacárregui averaged 32.0 receiving yards on 2 receptions; taking into account players with a minimum of 8 receptions during the season (1 per game), Rafael Adrian Gomez Galvan of the Condors CDMX led with an average of 25.7 receiving yards on 13 receptions.)
Defensive
Sacks	José David Casarrubias Santiago	DL	Raptors de Naucalpan	10
Assisted sacks	Felix Roberto Guerrero Sanchez	DL	Raptors de Naucalpan	3
Tackles	Miguel Angelo Canseco Larios	LB	Mexicas de la Ciudad de México	42
Assisted tackles	Miguel Angelo Canseco Larios	LB	Mexicas de la Ciudad de México	17
Interceptions	Fernando Ramírez Paredes	DB	Raptors de Naucalpan	5
Pick sixes	Carlos Fernando Espinoza Carvajal; Julián Darrell Crandall	DB; DB / WR	Condors CDMX; Osos de Toluca	2
Pass deflections	Sergio Schiaffino	DB	Dinos de Saltillo	14
Forced fumbles	Juan Francisco González Delgado; Miguel Angelo Canseco Larios	DL; LB	Mayas CDMX; Mexicas de la Ciudad de México	3
Touchdowns	Carlos Fernando Espinoza Carvajal; Julián Darrell Crandall	DB; DB / WR	Condors CDMX; Osos de Toluca	2
Kicking
PATs made	Diego Carsolio Urban	K	Raptors de Naucalpan	24
PAT attempts	Diego Carsolio Urban	K	Raptors de Naucalpan	24
Field goals made	Diego Carsolio Urban; Alan Alessandro Paoli García	K K	Raptors de Naucalpan; Condors CDMX	16
Field goal attempts	Diego Carsolio Urban; Alan Alessandro Paoli García	K K	Raptors de Naucalpan; Condors CDMX	16
Points	Diego Carsolio Urban	K	Raptors de Naucalpan	72
Returning
Total returns	Sergio Enrique Barbosa Garcia	WR	Dinos de Saltillo	22
Total return yards	Sergio Enrique Barbosa Garcia	WR	Dinos de Saltillo	453
Yards per return	Jesús David Rosales Robles	HB	Raptors de Naucalpan	39.0 (Note: Rosales averaged 39.0 returning yards on 1 return; taking into account players with a minimum of 8 returns during the season (1 per game), Joan Alejandro Medina Tabitas of the Dinos de Saltillo led with an average of 22.7 returning yards on 15 returns.)
Punt returns	Sergio Enrique Barbosa Garcia	WR	Dinos de Saltillo	13
Punt return yards	Sergio Enrique Barbosa Garcia	WR	Dinos de Saltillo	191
Kickoff returns	Kamaal McIlwain	CB	Mexicas de la Ciudad de México	14
Kickoff return yards	Allan Fernando Rosado Alvares	RB	Condors CDMX	281
Total return touchdowns	Sergio Enrique Barbosa Garcia; Edgar Josué Arroyo Flores; Jesús David Rosales Robles	WR; RB; HB	Dinos de Saltillo; Mayas CDMX; Raptors de Naucalpan	1
Source: LFA

== Playoffs ==
=== Playoff bracket ===
Division Finals
C2	Mayas	13
C1	Condors	18
N2	Fundidores	47
N1	Raptors	53*

Tazón Mexico IV
C1	Condors	20
N1	Raptors	16

* Indicates overtime victory

== Tazón México IV ==
Tazón México IV

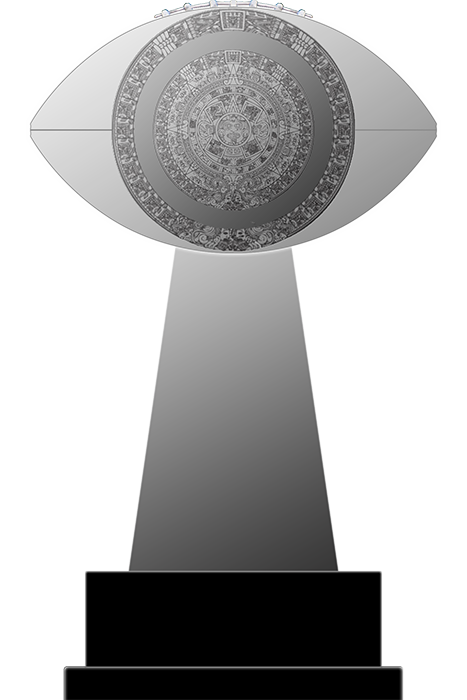

Raptors
vs
Condors
(6–2)

(6–2)
16

20
Head Coach:

Head Coach:
Guillermo Gutierrez

Felix Buendia

Teams	1C	2C	3C	4C
Raptors	0	9	0	7
Condors	6	0	7	7

Date: 12, May 2019
Kickoff time: 3 p.m.
Stadium: Estadio Azul
Weather: Sunny, 28°
Attendance: 18,000
MVP: Diego Arvizu, QB
Referee: Mario Matos
TV:
Half time show: Álex Lora
← III • Tazón México • V →

The Tazón México IV was held on May 12, 2019 at 3:00 p.m. at the Estadio Azul in Mexico City, with a record attendance for the LFA of 18,000 fans present. The commissioner of the CFL, Randy Ambrossie, was the great guest of the event and together with Alejandro Jaimes, commissioner of the LFA, and Gabriel Soto, they started the fourth edition of the Tazón México. Álex Lora performed the national anthem. The Condors became LFA champions, after beating the Raptors by a score of 20–16 in a somersault game and it was the most cardiac edition in the history of Tazón México, decided in the last 30 seconds of the game. The MVP of the match was Diego Arvizu "El Comandante" (QB) Condors.

Quarter	Time	Series			Team	Annotations	Score	
Quarter	Time	Plays	Yds	TOP	Team	Annotations	RAP	CON
1	9:37	2	75	0:54	CON	Touchdown, 60-yard run by RB Luis H. López Tinoco; the extra point is no good (K Alan Paoli)	0	6
2	7:40	12	75	5:46	RAP	Touchdown, 7-yard pass from QB Bruno Márquez to WR Antonio Tenorio; the extra point is no good (K Diego Carsolio)	6	6
2	5:08	6	17	2:10	RAP	Field goal, 19 yards from K Diego Carsolio	9	6
3	3:20				CON	Touchdown, 5-yard run of QB Diego Pérez Arvizu; the extra point is good (K Alan Paoli)	9	13
4	7:55				RAP	Touchdown, 43-yard pass from QB Bruno Márquez to WR Diego Yañes; the extra point is good (K Diego Carsolio)	16	13
4	4:25				CON	Touchdown, 55-yard pass from QB Diego Pérez Arvizu to WR Andrés Salgado; the extra point is good (K Alan Paoli)	16	20

== Awards ==
Following the season, awards are shown the best of the 2019 season.

Award	Winner	(Position)	Team
MVP of the season	Bruno Márquez	QB	Raptors
Coach of the year	Félix Buendía	HC	Condors
Rookie of the Year	Sebastián Olvera	WR	Artilleros
Offensive player of the year	Bruno Márquez	QB	Raptors
Defensive player of the year	David Casarrubias	DL	Raptors
Best Offensive Lineman	Diego Kuhlmann	OL	Osos
Best defensive lineman	Francisco Krauss	DL	Fundidores
Best deep threat	Jordi Saldaña	WR	Mayas
Best linebacker	Miguel Canseco	LB	Mexicas
Best runner	Luis Lopez Tinoco	RB	Condors
Best receiver	Guillermo Villalobos	WR	Mexicas
