= Raptors del Valle de México =

Mexican American football team

Logo

General information
- Founded: 2015; 11 years ago
- Stadium: Club Comanches
- Headquartered: Atizapán de Zaragoza, Mexico
- Colours: Green, gold and white
- Mascot: Rolo

Personnel
- Owner: Armando Zúñiga
- Head coach: Horacio García

Nickname
- La Furia Verde (The Green Fury)

League / conference affiliations
- Liga de Fútbol Americano Profesional

Championships
- Division Titles: 0; 3 (2017, 2019, 2020)

Raptors del Valle de México (English: Naucalpan Raptors) are an American football team based in Naucalpan, Mexico. The Raptors compete in the Liga de Fútbol Americano Profesional, the top American football league in Mexico. The team plays its home games at the Estadio José Ortega Martínez.

Despite never winning an LFA title, the Raptors have the most playoff appearances with six.

== History ==
The team was founded on 4 November 2015 and is one of the four charter members of the Liga de Fútbol Americano Profesional.

=== Rafael Duk era (2016–2017) ===
In their first season, the Raptors finished second in the league with a 4–2 regular season record, qualifying for the Tazón México I. The team, though, lost the league's championship 13–29 to the Mayas.

The Raptors led the North Division on the 2017 season, qualifying for playoffs with a 5–2 regular season record, led by League MVP, QB Bruno Márquez. In the divisional game, the team lost to the newcomers Dinos, despite their opponent having a losing record.

=== Guillermo Gutiérrez era (2018–present) ===
In 2018, Guillermo Gutiérrez replaced Rafael Duk as head coach. Also, the team switched from the Estadio Jesús Martínez "Palillo" to the Estadio José Ortega Martínez, in Naucalpan, State of Mexico. The Raptors qualified to the playoffs as second in the North Division with a 3–4 record. In a rematch of the 2017 game, Raptors defeated 21–6 Dinos in the divisional game, earning a spot in the Tazón México III. The team lost its second Tazón Mexico game, 0–17 to the Mexicas.

In 2019, the team dominated the North Division, finishing with a 6–2 (5–1 in the division) regular season record. After defeating the Fundidores in over time at the divisional game, Raptors qualified for their third Tazón México, and the second in a row. Raptors lost the championship against the Condors 16–20. This was the third Tazón Mexico loss for the team and the second in a row.

The 2020 season was cancelled due to the COVID-19 pandemic, the Raptors had a 4–1 record at the moment of the suspension of the season. The 2021 season was also cancelled.

In 2022 the Raptors finished the regular season as the fourth ranked team with a 4–2 record, qualifying to the playoffs, where they were eliminated by the Fundidores on the semifinal 27–30 with a touchdown pass from Shelton Eppler to Tavarious Battiste on the last play of the game.

== Rivals ==
=== Dinos de Saltillo ===
The Dinos de Saltillo and the Raptors play each season the so-called Jurassic Duel (Spanish: Duelo Jurásico). Due to these teams being two of the strongest in the league in recent years, this rivalry is considered amongst LFA's most important rivalries.

Dinos de Saltillo vs. Raptors de Naucalpan season-by-season results
Season	Results	Location	Overall series
2017	Raptors; 34–27	Estadio Jesús Martínez "Palillo"	Raptors; 1–0
2017	Raptors; 19–6	Estadio Olímpico de Saltillo	Raptors; 2–0
2017	Dinos; 13–10	Estadio Jesús Martínez "Palillo"	Raptors; 2–1
2018	Dinos; 29–27	Estadio José Ortega Martínez	Tie; 2–2
2018	Dinos; 23–20	Estadio Olímpico de Saltillo	Dinos; 3–2
2018	Raptors; 21–6	Estadio Olímpico de Saltillo	Tie; 3–3
2019	Raptors; 21–7	Estadio Olímpico de Saltillo	Raptors; 4–3
2019	Raptors; 19–7	Estadio FES Acatlán	Raptors; 5–3
2020	Dinos; 30–29	Estadio Olímpico de Saltillo	Raptors; 5–4
2022	Raptors; 28–27	Estadio FES Acatlán	Raptors; 6–4
2023	Dinos; 24–14	Estadio Francisco I. Madero	Raptors; 6–5

== Stadiums ==
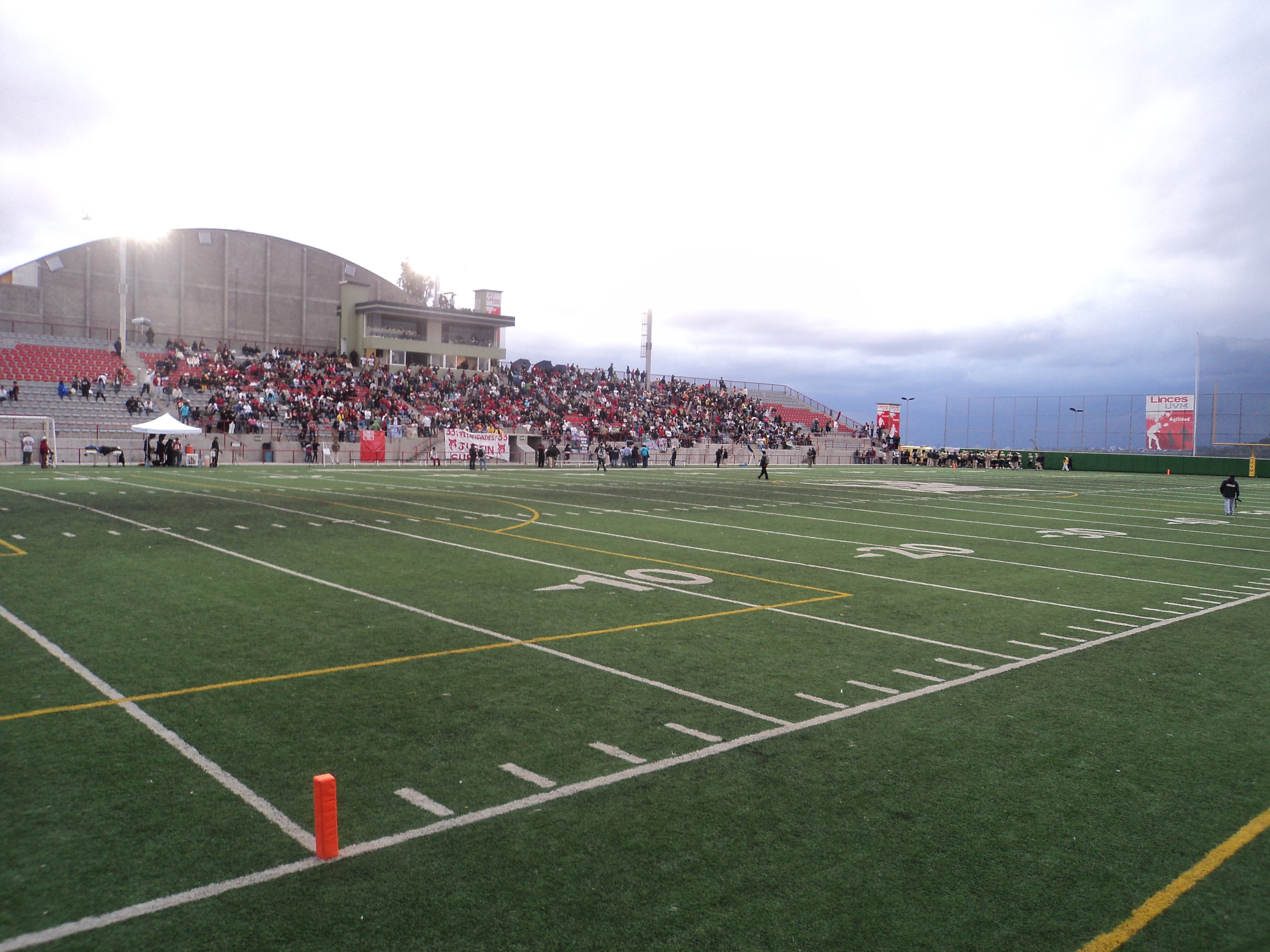
Estadio José Ortega Martínez, hosted the Raptors during the 2018 and 2020 seasons.

Raptors de Naucalpan stadiums
Stadium	Tenure
Estadio Jesús Martínez "Palillo"	2016–2017
Estadio José Ortega Martínez	2018
Estadio FES Acatlán	2019
Estadio José Ortega Martínez	2020–2021
Estadio FES Acatlán	2022
Estadio José Ortega Martínez	2023–present

In 2016, for the inaugural season of the LFA, all of the four founding teams (Condors, Eagles, Mayas and Raptors) played all their matches at the Estadio Jesús Martínez "Palillo", in the Magdalena Mixhuca Sports City.

For the 2018 season, Raptors moved from "Palillo" Martínez stadium to the Estadio José Ortega Martínez in Naucalpan, State of Mexico, the stadium has a capacity of 3,700 spectators and it is located inside the Universidad del Valle de México Lomas Verdes campus and it is regularly used by the university's college football team, the Linces.

In 2019, the team moved from the Estadio José Ortega Martínez to the field of the National Autonomous University of Mexico Acatlán campus, also located in Naucalpan and used by FES Acatlán's college football team: Pumas Acatlán. The cause of the movement has not been disclosed nor by the team or the league.

Raptors returned to the Estadio José Ortega Martínez for the 2020 season.

Despite the fact that the team is branded as being from Naucalpan, Raptors played their home matches for the two first seasons in Mexico City and they only moved to Naucalpan for the 2018 season.

== Season-by-season ==
Season	Head coach	Regular season				Postseason			
Season	Head coach	Won	Lost	Win %	Finish	Won	Lost	Win %	Result
2016	Rafael Duk	4	2	.666	2nd (League)	0	1	.000	Lost Tazón México I vs (Mayas) 13–29
2017	Rafael Duk	5	2	.714	1st (North)	0	1	.000	Lost North Division Championship (Dinos) 10–13
2018	Guillermo Gutiérrez	3	4	.429	2nd (North)	1	1	.500	Won North Division Championship at (Dinos) 21–6; Lost Tazón México III (vs Mexicas) 0–17
2019	Guillermo Gutiérrez	5	2	.714	1st (North)	1	1	.500	Won North Division Championship (Fundidores) 53–47 (OT); Lost Tazón México IV (vs Condors) 16–20
2020	Guillermo Gutiérrez	4	1	.800	1st (North)	Postseason cancelled due to the COVID-19 pandemic			
2021	Season cancelled due to the COVID-19 pandemic								
2022	Guillermo Gutiérrez	4	2	.600	4th (League)	1	1	.500	Won Wild Card round (Reyes) 26-6; Lost Semifinal at (Fundidores) 27–30
2023	Guillermo Gutiérrez	4	6	.400	7th (League)	-	-	-	-
2024	Guillermo Gutiérrez	5	3	.625	3rd (League)	2	1	.667	Won Semifinals at (Mexicas) 24–17; Lost Tazón México VII (vs Caudillos) 14–34
Total		34	22	.607		5	6	.455	

== Awards ==
- North Division
  - Champions (2): (2018, 2019)

== Notable players ==
See Category:Raptors de Naucalpan players
