= Estadio Wilfrido Massieu =

Stadium in Mexico City, Mexico

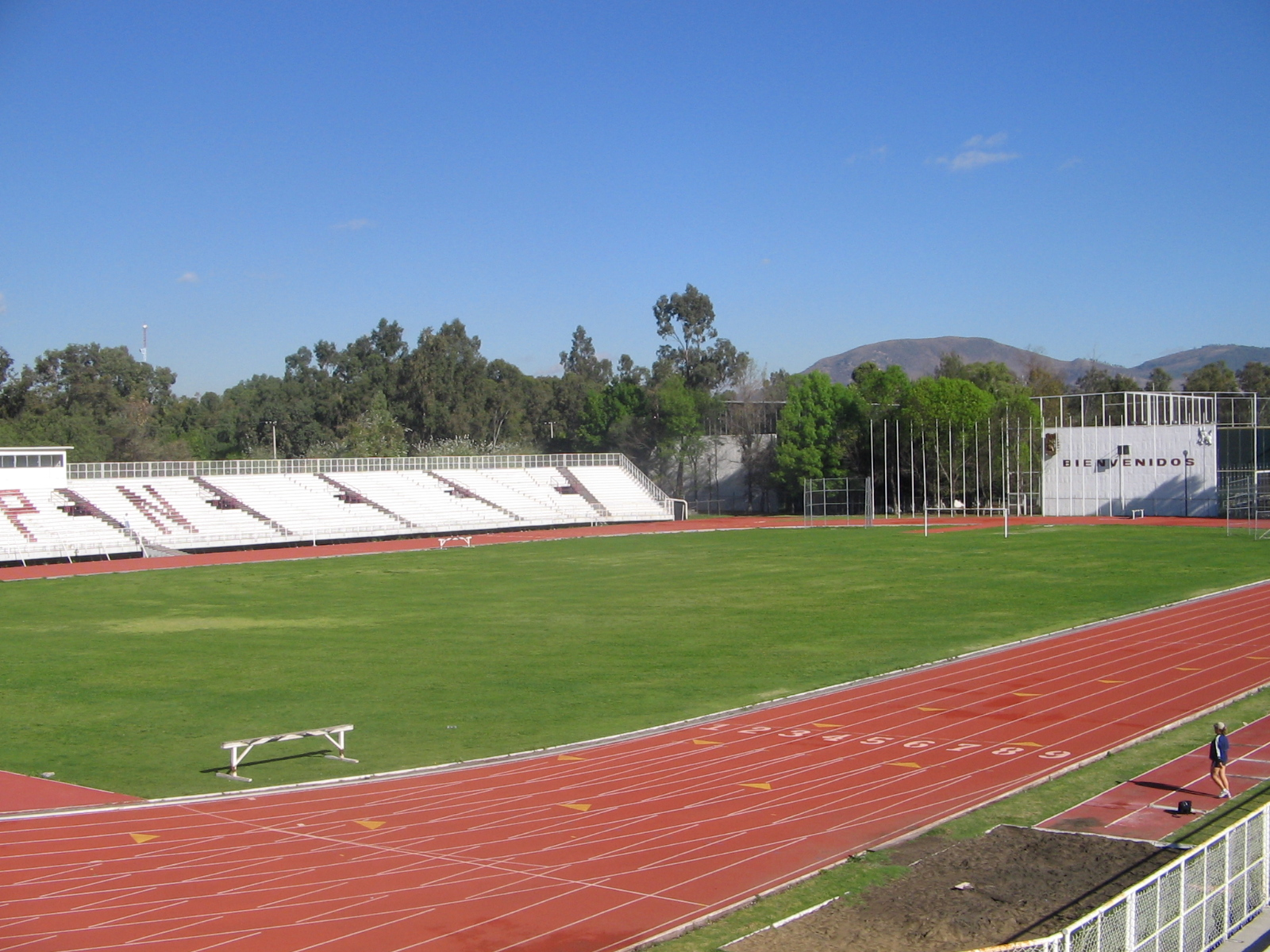
- Partial view of the stadium from the east corner.
- Interactive map of Estadio Wilfrido Massieu
- Full name: Estadio Wilfrido Massieu
- Location: Mexico City, Mexico
- Coordinates: 19°30′07″N 99°08′19″W
- Owner: National Polytechnic Institute
- Operator: National Polytechnic Institute
- Capacity: 13,000
- Surface: Grass

Construction
- Opened: 1959
- Renovated: 1994

Tenants
- Mayas (LFA) (2019); Águilas Blancas (White Eagles) (ONEFA) (1969-2000, 2015-present); Burros Blancos (White Donkeys) (ONEFA) (1959-2000, 2015)

Estadio Wilfrido Massieu is an outdoor stadium located north of Mexico City, within the "Adolfo Lopez Mateos" campus of the National Polytechnic Institute (IPN). It was built in 1959 and has a capacity of 15,000 spectators. The stadium is the home field of the IPN's college football teams: the Águilas Blancas and Burros Blancos.

The stadium was primarily used for American football until 2000, when it was vetoed from American football events by damages in its structure. However, in 2015 it was announced that the stadium will again host American football matches.

Currently, the stadium is also used by the Mayas of the Liga de Fútbol Americano Profesional.

== See also ==
- Águilas Blancas
- Mexican College Football
