= Fundidores de Monterrey =

Mexican American football team

- Current season
Logo

General information
- Founded: 28 September 2016; 9 years ago
- Folded: 2025
- Stadium: Estadio Banorte
- Headquartered: Monterrey, Mexico
- Colours: Black and gold
- Mascot: Coque

Personnel
- Owner: List: Fabián Marcos David Peréz-Salinas José Luis Domene Carlos Lankenau Gerardo Contreras
- General manager: José Luis Domene
- Head coach: Jorge Valdez

Nickname
- El Reino de Fuego (The Kingdom of Fire)

League / conference affiliations
- Liga de Fútbol Americano Profesional

Championships
- Tazón México championship(s): 0; 1: 2022 (V)

Fundidores de Monterrey (English: Monterrey Smelters), officially Fundidores, were an American football team based in Monterrey, Mexico. The Fundidores competed in the Liga de Fútbol Americano Profesional (LFA), the top American football league in Mexico. The team played its home games at the Estadio Banorte. In January 2025, the franchise came under new ownership and was renamed Osos de Monterrey.

== History ==
=== Origins ===
Monterrey has an important American football tradition. It is home of two of the most popular college football teams: the Auténticos Tigres of the Autonomous University of Nuevo León and the Borregos Salvajes of the Monterrey Institute of Technology and Higher Education. The city was also home for a short time to the Mexico Golden Aztecs of the Continental Football League.

In the late 90s, Monterrey had a semi-professional team playing in the Liga Nacional Master (Master National League), Cerveceros de Monterrey (Monterrey Brewers), who were national champions in 1995.

=== Early years ===
The Fundidores (Spanish for smelters or founders) were founded in September 2016 as part of the 2017 LFA's expansion, this expansion also included another team in the North of Mexico: the Dinos de Saltillo. The name is a reference to the city's Steel Foundry Company, that operated from 1900 to 1986 in what is now the Fundidora Park.

The team debuted at the Liga de Fútbol Americano Profesional in the 2017 season. On week 2, at the game against the Dinos, former NFL player, Chad Johnson, made its debut (and only appearance) with the team and scored on a 41-yard touchdown reception to help the Fundidores win the game. Monterrey ended the season with a 2–5 record, not qualifying for the playoffs.

For the 2018 season, the Fundidores failed again to qualify for the playoffs after finishing with a 2–5 regular season record.

=== Carlos Strevel era (2020–2023) ===
Carlos Strevel was presented as head coach of the Fundidores ahead of the 2020 season. Strevel had previous experience as coach and administrator for several youth and college football programs in Mexico, most notably with the Borregos Salvajes CEM.

In December 2020, Strevel felt into coma derived from COVID-19 complications. After recovering, Strevel returned to the Fundidores training camp in 2022, once the LFA authorized the 2022 season to be played.

Strevel led the Fundidores to their first Tazón México championship in 2022, after defeating the Gallos Negros de Querétaro 18–14 in the Tazón México V, played in Tijuana.

On 9 April 2023, the team announced that Carlos Strevel and Carlos Mercado, defensive coordinator, would no longer be with the team. Later that day, the team presented the Monterrey born Jorge Valdez, a remarkable linebacker as well as assistant coach of Auténticos Tigres, as the Fundidores' new head coach.

=== Jorge Valdez era (2023–present) ===
Jorge "Pelón" Valdez was named head coach by the front office on 9 April 2023. He replaced Carlos Strevel as head coach and Carlos Mercado as defensive coordinator. Jorge had previous experience as the assistant to the head coach and defensive coordinator of Auténticos Tigres.

=== New ownership ===
In January 2025 the franchise was bought by the Athlete Ownership Group and changed its name to Osos de Monterrey.

== Stadiums ==
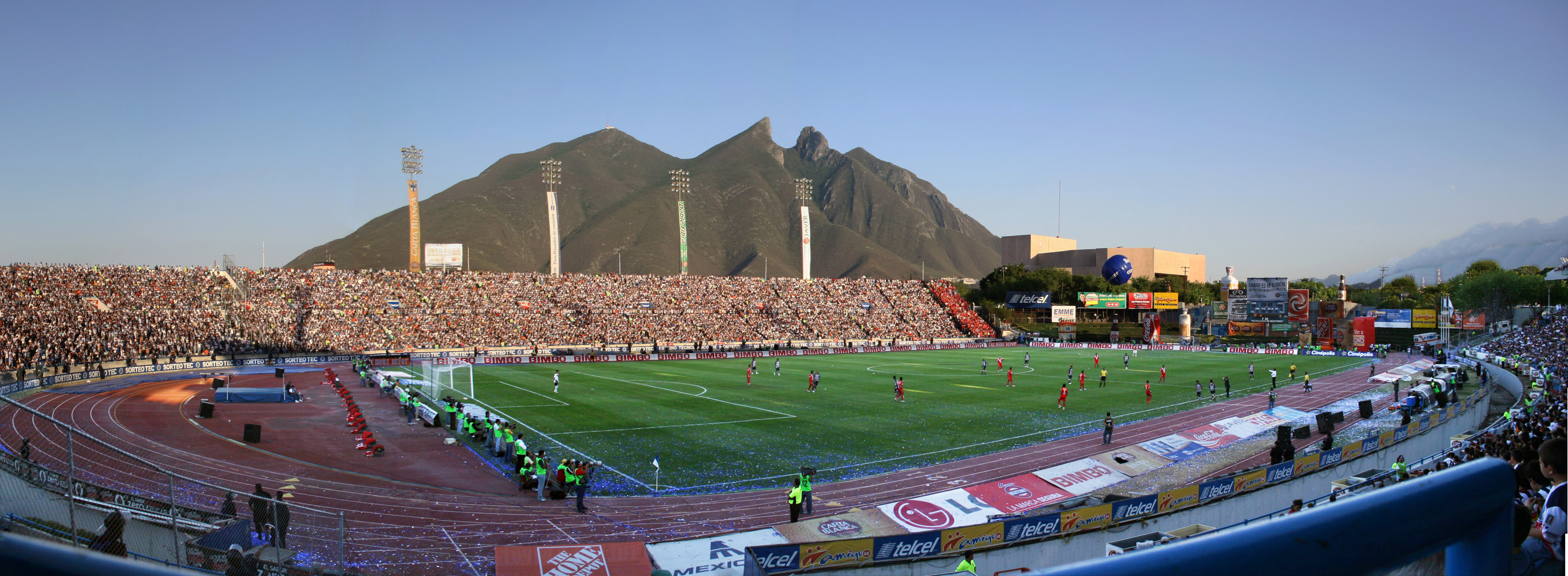
Estadio Tecnológico hosted Fundidores home games during 2017.

Fundidores de Monterrey stadiums
Stadium	Tenure
Estadio Tecnológico	2017
Estadio Nuevo León Unido	2018–2019
Estadio Borregos	2020–present

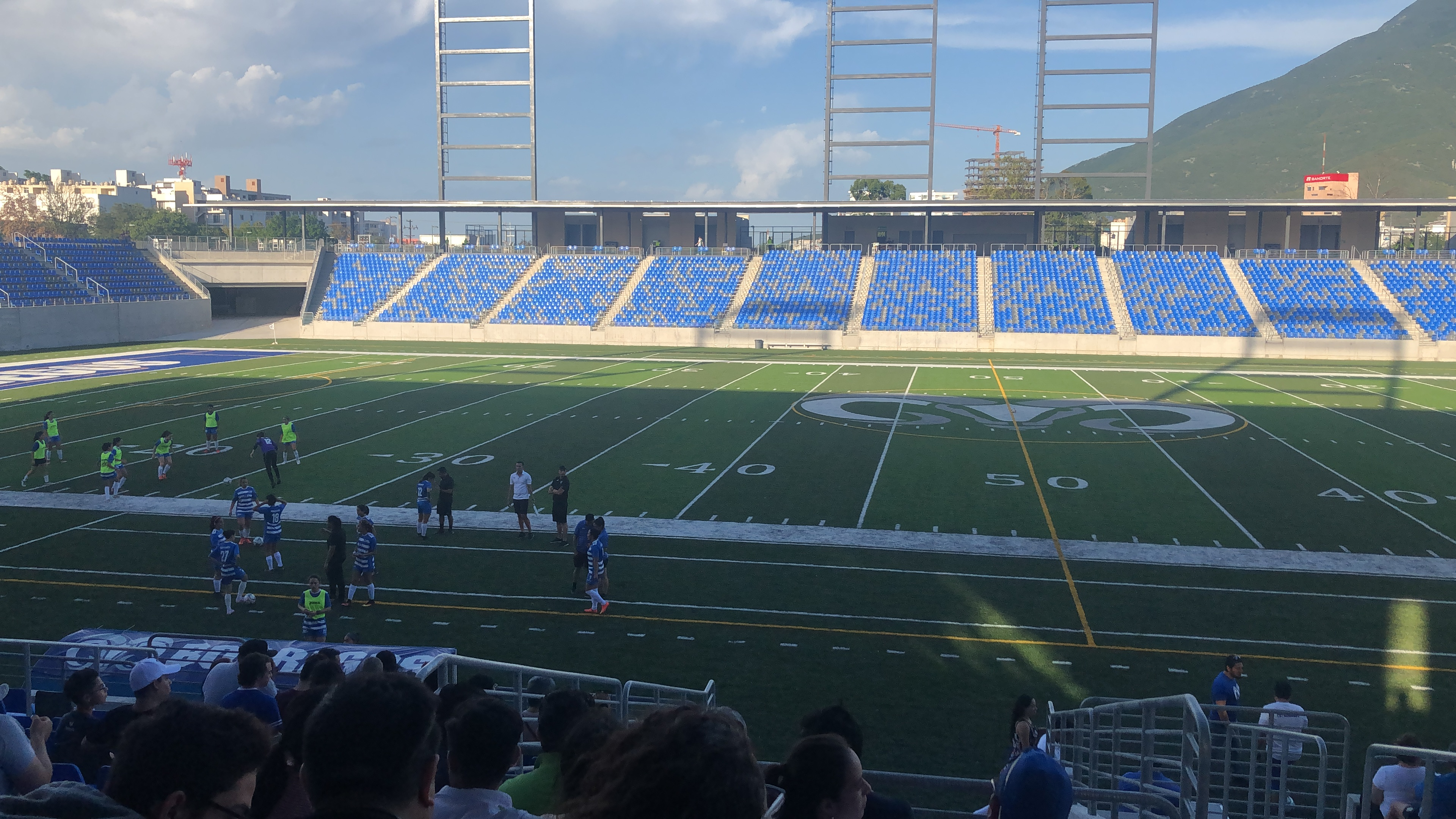
Estadio Borregos currently hosts the Fundidores.

For their first season in Liga de Fútbol Americano Profesional, the Fundidores played their home games at the Estadio Tecnológico which had been used previously for football matches by C.F. Monterrey, but, in that moment, Fundidores were the only tenant, since Monterrey had already moved to the Estadio BBVA Bancomer.

On 9 April 2017 Fundidores played their last match at Estadio Tecnológico before it was demolished.

For the 2018 season, Fundidores moved to Estadio Nuevo León Unido, a stadium with a 1,500 spectators capacity and artificial turf owned by the Government of Nuevo León.

In 2020, the team moved to Estadio Borregos, with a capacity of 10,057 spectators, a major upgrade, since Estadio Nuevo León Unido could only accommodate 1,500 people. The stadium is owned by the Monterrey Institute of Technology and Higher Education and it is used by college football team Borregos Salvajes Monterrey.

The Fundidores debuted in their new stadium on 14 February 2020 in a match against rivals Dinos de Saltillo in the Clásico del Norte (Northern Classic), where they lost 15–23.

== Rivals ==
=== Dinos de Saltillo ===
Fundidores and Dinos are from northern Mexico and were divisional rivals since the establishment of the divisional system in the LFA in 2017, which was later discarded in 2022. The rivalry between the two cities, Saltillo and Monterrey, dates back to the times of the Liga Nacional de Futbol Americano (National American Football League) in the late 90s, when both cities had fierce matches between their two teams: the Dinosaurios (Dinosaurs) and the Cerveceros (Brewers). The rivalry goes beyond the gridiron, since both teams fight season after season to get the best college players from Nuevo León and Coahuila. The rivalry is known as Clásico del Norte (Northern Classic).

Dinos de Saltillo vs. Fundidores de Monterrey season-by-season results
Season	Results	Location	Overall series
2017	Dinos; 33–16	Estadio Olímpico Francisco I. Madero	Dinos; 1–0
2017	Fundidores; 14–6	Estadio Tecnológico	Tie; 1–1
2018	Fundidores; 17–0	Estadio Nuevo León Unido	Fundidores; 2–1
2018	Dinos; 30–20	Estadio Olímpico Francisco I. Madero	Tie; 2–2
2019	Fundidores; 26–13	Estadio Nuevo León Unido	Fundidores; 3–2
2019	Dinos; 8–0	Estadio Olímpico Francisco I. Madero	Tie; 3–3
2020	Dinos; 23–15	Estadio Borregos	Dinos; 4–3
2022	Dinos; 24–17	Estadio Francisco I. Madero	Dinos; 5–3
2023	Dinos; 38–31	Estadio Francisco I. Madero	Dinos; 6–3
2023	Fundidores; 55–34	Estadio Borregos	Dinos; 6–4

== Season-by-season ==
Season	Head coach	Regular season				Postseason			
Season	Head coach	Won	Lost	Win %	Finish	Won	Lost	Win %	Result
Fundidores de Monterrey
2017	Leopoldo Treviño	2	5	.286	3rd (North)	–	–	—	—
2018	Israel González	2	5	.286	3rd (North)	–	–	—	—
2019	Israel González	3	5	.375	2nd (North)	0	1	.000	Lost North Division Championship (at Raptors) 53–47 (OT)
2020	Carlos Strevel	3	2	.600	3rd (North)	Postseason cancelled due to the COVID-19 pandemic			
2021	Season cancelled due to the COVID-19 pandemic								
2022	Carlos Strevel	4	2	.667	1st (League)	2	0	1.000	Won Semifinals (Raptors) 30–27; Won Tazón México V (Gallos Negros) 18-14
2023	Carlos Strevel / Jorge Valdez	6	4	.600	5th (league)	1	1	.500	Won Wild Card (Reds) 17–10; Lost Semifinals (Caudillos) 34-20
2024	Jorge Valdez	4	4	.500	5th (league)	1	1	.500	Won Wild Card (Dinos) 26–17; Lost Semifinals (Caudillos) 20-12
Total		24	28	.462		4	3	.571	

== Championships ==
=== Tazón México championships ===
Year	Coach	Location	Opponent	Score	Record
2022	Carlos Strevel	Estadio Caliente (Tijuana)	Gallos Negros de Querétaro	18–14	6–2

== Notable players ==
See Category:Fundidores de Monterrey players
