= Condors CDMX =

Mexican American football team

- Logo
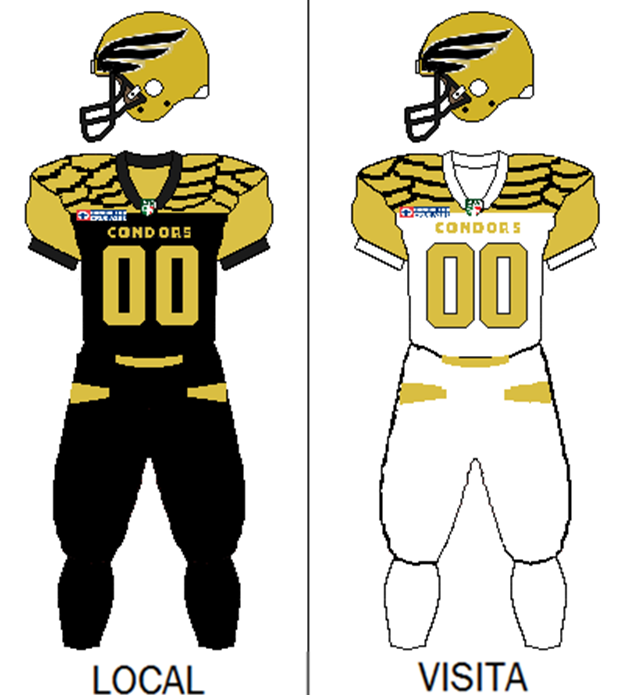
- Uniforms

General information
- Founded: 4 November 2015; 10 years ago
- Folded: 2021; 5 years ago
- Stadium: Estadio Tormenta Negra
- Headquartered: Mexico City, Mexico
- Colours: Gold, black, and white

League / conference affiliations
- Liga de Fútbol Americano Profesional; 2016–2021; Central Division

Championships
- Tazón México championships: 0; 1 2019 (IV)
- Division championships: 0; 2 (2019, 2020)

The Condors LFA or Condors CDMX, were an American football team that began in Mexico City, Mexico. The Condors competed in the LFA, the top American football league in Mexico. The team had won Tazon Mexico IV.

== History ==
The team was founded in 2015 as one of the charter members of the Liga de Fútbol Americano Profesional, alongside Eagles, Mayas and Raptors.

The club's name and colours were chosen as a remembrance to the defunct college football team Cóndores of the National Autonomous University of Mexico, which played from 1970 to 1998, winning 10 National Championships. Thus, most of the players that were in the team's squad for the first season had played their college career at UNAM's teams. A group of Cóndores and Pumas CU fans created the first Condors' fan group, known as Legión Cóndor (Condor Legion).

On their first season, under head coach Enrique Zapata, the team could only win one game against their rivals Eagles, finishing with a 1–5 regular season record, being relegated from playoffs as the worst team in the league.

For the 2017 season, the team finished as the last ranked team in the league for second consecutive time with a 2–5 regular season record, again failing to advance to the playoffs.

In 2018, the team was franchised, this brought several changes, with the most important being the arrival of Félix Buendía as head coach. Despite the changes, the team failed to qualify for playoffs for third time in a row, finishing the season with a 3–4 record.

In 2019, Condors qualified for the playoffs for their first time after finishing with a 6–2 regular season record. The team defeated the Mayas at the Central Division championship game 18–13, qualifying for the Tazón México IV.

=== Relocation and indefinite Hiatus ===
In November 2021, LFA Commissioner, Alejandro Jaimes, announced that the Condors would relocate prior to the 2022 LFA season, having been acquired by the ownership group of football club Querétaro.

On 3 February 2022, the team was rebranded as Gallos Negros Querétaro. Following the rebrand, the league considers Gallos Negros as a new franchise that began competing in the 2022 season.

== Uniforms ==
Historic uniforms

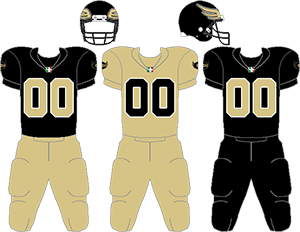
Seasons 2016-2018

== Season-by-season ==
Season	Head coach	Regular season				Postseason			
Season	Head coach	Won	Lost	Win %	Finish	Won	Lost	Win %	Result
2016	Enrique Zapata	1	5	.166	4th (League)	–	–	–	–
2017	Enrique Zapata	2	5	.286	3rd (Central)	–	–	–	–
2018	Félix Buendía	3	4	.429	3rd (Central)	–	–	–	–
2019	Félix Buendía	6	2	.750	1st (Central)	2	0	1.000	Won Central Division Championship (Mayas) 18–13; Won Tazón México IV (vs Raptors) 20–16
2020	Félix Buendía	4	1	.800	1st (Central)	Postseason cancelled due to the COVID-19 pandemic			
2021	Season cancelled due to the COVID-19 pandemic								

== Awards ==
- Tazón México
  - Champions (1): (2019)
- Central Division
  - Champions (1): (2019)

== Notable players ==
See Category:Condors CDMX players
