= Mayas CDMX =

Mexican American football team

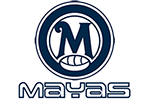
- Logo
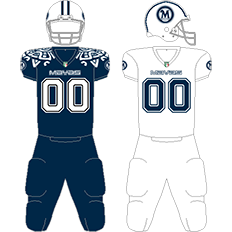
- Uniforms

General information
- Founded: 2015; 11 years ago
- Folded: 2020
- Stadium: Estadio Wilfrido Massieu
- Headquartered: Mexico City, Mexico
- Colours: Navy and White
- Website: Official page

Personnel
- Head coach: Francisco Chaparro

Nickname
- Imperio Azul (Blue Empire)

League / conference affiliations
- Liga de Fútbol Americano Profesional; 2016–2019; Central Division

Championships
- Tazón México championships: 0; 2: 2016 (I), 2017 (II)
- Division Championships: 0; 1 2017

The Mayas, also called Mayas LFA or Mayas Puebla, were an American football team based in Mexico City (CDMX), Mexico. The Mayas competed in the Central Division of the Liga de Fútbol Americano Profesional, the top American football league in Mexico. The Mayas played their home games at the Estadio Wilfrido Massieu.

Mayas was the most successful team in the LFA until it folded in 2020, winning the championship twice in 2016 and 2017, and qualifying for playoffs every season as of 2019.

== History ==
=== Club origins ===
The club was founded on 4 November 2015 as one of the charter members of the Liga de Fútbol Americano Profesional, alongside Condors, Eagles and Raptors. The team picked navy blue and white as their colours. Originally, the team nickname was supposed to be Mexicas after coming first in a poll among fans, nevertheless, the name Mexicas was already registered, therefore, the team had to pick the name that finished second in the poll: Mayas. The name Mayas, refers to the Maya people.

=== Ernesto Alfaro era (2016–2018) ===
On their first season, the team finished with a 4–2 regular season record, qualifying for the Tazón México I, where they defeated the Raptors 29–13, winning the league's inaugural championship.

For the 2017 season, Mayas finished as the best team in the league with a 6–1 regular season record. They defeated the Eagles 40–18 at the divisional game and became two-time champions of the LFA after winning the Tazón México II 24–18 to the Dinos.

On their third season, Mayas qualified for playoffs for third time in a row after finishing with a 5–2 regular season record and as leaders of the Central Division and best team in the league. Despite this, the team lost in the divisional game 17–27 against Mexicas.

In April 2018, after losing the divisional game against Mexicas, head coach Ernesto Alfaro announced his departure from the team. As head coach of the Mayas, Alfaro won two Tazón México championships and managed to qualify for the playoffs during his three seasons in charge of the team with a 18–6 overall record.

=== Francisco Chaparro era (2019–) ===
In 2019, the team again qualified for playoffs, making it to postseason for fourth time in a row, after defeating Artilleros 25–20 at the Estadio Templo del Dolor in the last game of the season.

==== Hiatus ====
Mayas had moved to Puebla, Mexico after their first 4 season in Mexico city. The team had intended to be in hiatus for the 2020 season prior to the pandemic in Mexico. In 2021, it was confirmed by the commissioner that the Mayas will remain on hiatus until the team acquires investors.

== Stadiums ==
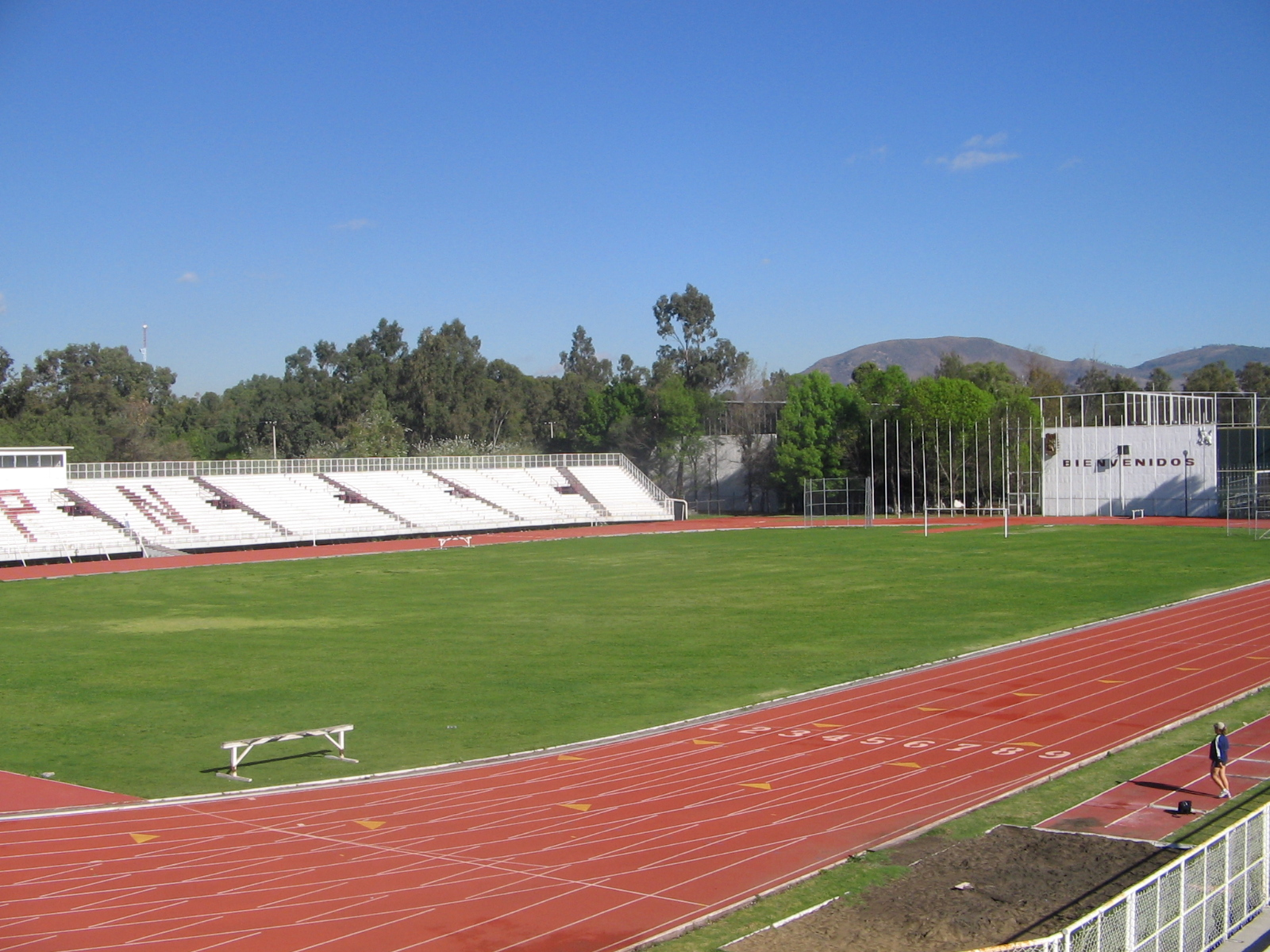
Estadio Wilfrido Massieu, current home field of the Mayas.

Mayas CDMX stadiums
Stadium	Tenure
Estadio Jesús Martínez "Palillo"	2016–2018
Estadio Wilfrido Massieu	2019–present

In 2016, for the inaugural season of the LFA, all of the four founding teams (Condors, Eagles, Raptors and Mayas) played all their matches at the Estadio Jesús Martínez "Palillo", in the Magdalena Mixhuca Sports City.

While other teams left for new stadiums the next season (the Raptors moved to the Estadio José Ortega Martínez in Naucalpan, for instance), the Mayas stayed at the "Palillo" Martínez stadium for the 2017 and 2018 seasons.

Previous to the 2019 season, it was announced that the Mayas would move to the Estadio Wilfrido Massieu in the main campus of the Instituto Politécnico Nacional in northern Mexico City. The stadium is normally used by the IPN's college football teams.

Though it has not been officially stated by the league, one of the probable causes of the Mayas leaving the "Palillo" Martínez stadium, is the fact that the stadium has been designated as a shelter for Central American migrants by Mexico City's government.

With a capacity of 13,000 spectators, the Estadio Wilfrido Massieu is currently the largest venue in the Liga de Fútbol Americano Profesional.

== Season-by-season ==
Season	Head coach	Regular season				Postseason			
Season	Head coach	Won	Lost	Win %	Finish	Won	Lost	Win %	Result
2016	Ernesto Alfaro	4	2	.666	1st (League)	1	0	1.000	Won Tazón México I (vs Raptors) 29–13
2017	Ernesto Alfaro	6	1	.857	1st (Central)	2	0	1.000	Won Central Division Championship (Eagles) 48–18; Won Tazón México II (vs Raptors) 24–18
2018	Ernesto Alfaro	5	2	.714	1st (Central)	0	1	.000	Lost Central Division Championship (Mexicas) 27–17
2019	Francisco Chaparro	5	3	.625	2nd (Central)	0	1	.000	Lost Central Division Championship at (Condors) 18–13

== Awards ==
- Tazón México
  - Champions (2): (2016, 2017)
- Central Division
  - Champions (1): (2017)

== Notable players ==
See Category:Mayas CDMX players
