= Estadio Olímpico de Saltillo =

Multi-use stadium in Coahulia, Mexico

Coordinates: 25°25′55″N 100°58′47″W

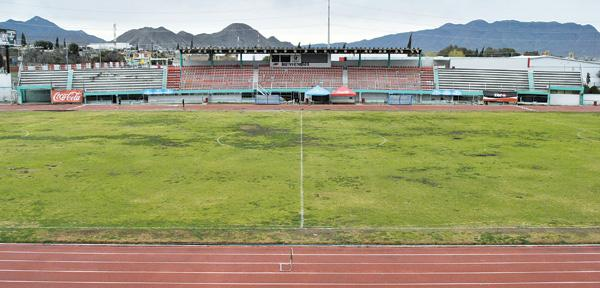
- Interactive map of Estadio Olímpico de Saltillo
- Location: Saltillo, Coahuila, Mexico
- Capacity: 7,000
- Surface: Artificial turf

Tenants
- Saltillo F.C. (Serie A) (2017–2024); Dinos de Saltillo (LFA) (2017–2021, 2025–present); Saltillo Soccer (Liga TDP) (2015–present)

The Estadio Olímpico de Saltillo is a multi-use stadium in Saltillo, Coahuila, Mexico. It is currently used mostly for association football and american football matches, and is the home stadium for Saltillo Soccer F.C. and Dinos de Saltillo.

The stadium has a capacity of 7,000 people for football matches and 8,000 for American football games, due to the addition of temporary stands in both ends of the field. There are plans from Atlético Saltillo to upgrade the stadium so that it fulfills Serie A requirements.

The stadium previously hosted the Dinos de Saltillo of the Liga de Fútbol Americano Profesional (LFA), from 2017 to 2021. In 2022, Dinos moved to the Estadio Francisco I. Madero. In 2025 Dinos returned to the stadium.

The stadium has an adjacent parking lot with 80 spaces.
