= Mexicas de la Ciudad de México =

Mexican American football team

Logo

General information
- Founded: 4 November 2015; 10 years ago
- Stadium: Estadio ITESM CCM
- Headquartered: Mexico City, Mexico
- Colours: Red, black and white

Personnel
- Owner: Juan José Aguirre
- Head coach: Félix Buendía

Nickname
- La Sangre Mexica (Mexica blood)

League / conference affiliations
- Liga de Fútbol Americano Profesional

Championships
- Tazón México championships: 0; 2 2018 (III), 2025 (VIII)

The Mexicas de la Ciudad de México (English: Mexico City Mexicas), also called Mexicas LFA or Mexicas CDMX, are an American football team based in Mexico City (CDMX), Mexico. The team was founded in 2015 with the name of Eagles, and is one of the four charter members of the Liga de Fútbol Americano Profesional, the top American football league in Mexico. The Mexicas play their home games at the Estadio ITESM CCM.

== History ==
The team was founded on 4 November 2015, one of the four original franchises of the LFA. The team hoped to draw fans from the local university, Instituto Politécnico Nacional. The IPN football team, the Águilas Blancas (White Eagles), were one of the most popular teams in ONEFA and their team colors are cherry and white. For these reasons, the LFA franchise chose Eagles as their nickname and adopted similar colors of red and white. Antonio Sandoval was hired as the Eagles first head coach.

The Eagles played their first game of the inaugural LFA season on 21 February 2016, losing 28-30 against the Condors. The Eagles would get their first victory seven days later, defeating the Raptors 29–27. Finishing with a record of 3–3 in their first season, the Eagles fell short of qualifying for the playoffs.

José Campuzano replaced Sandoval as head coach for 2017. In his first year, he led the Eagles to a 4–3 record, and an appearance in the playoffs. But in the Central Division Championship Game, the Eagles were crushed by the Mayas, 40–18.

In its first two seasons, all LFA teams were directly administered by the league. Prior to the 2018 season, the LFA decided to allow the franchising of its teams. On 5 October 2017, the Eagles were acquired by Marco Antonio Conde, director of the Universidad del Conde de Coatepec, Veracruz. With the arrival of Conde, the Eagles were renamed as Mexicas, a nickname used by the sports teams of the aforementioned university. The team colors of red and white were changed to red and black.

With a new nickname and new team colors, the team also had yet another new head coach to open a season. Rafael Duk equaled the previous season results, taking the Mexicas to a 4–3 record. The team generated controversy by refusing to play in Week 3 against the Dinos Saltillo, after a serious knee injury to wide receiver Mubalama Massimango that occurred in Week 1, and was not properly attended to by the LFA. Although the league recognized that there was an administrative problem with the medical expenses insurance policy, the team was punished for its forfeit, and had to pay a fine of $657,820.00 MXN (approximately US$32,000), and would have to change their franchisee for the 2019 season.

Despite the controversy, the team on the field excelled. Unlike the 2017 team that stumbled in the playoffs, the Mexicas were able to win the Central Division Championship Game by defeating the Mayas 27–17. On 22 April 2018 at Estadio Azul, the Mexicas made the most of their first appearance in the Tazón México, shutting out the Raptors 17–0 for their first LFA title.

In September 2018, the new team franchisees announced they would to move the site of their home stadium to Campo del Casco de Santo Tomás starting with the 2019 season.

In 2019, the team had its worst season since its inception, finishing with a 2–6 record and becoming the first defending champion to fail to qualify for the playoffs.

=== Team names ===
- Eagles CDMX (2016–2017)
- Mexicas de la Ciudad de México (2018–present)

== Season-by-season ==
Season	Head coach	Regular season				Postseason			
Season	Head coach	Won	Lost	Win %	Finish	Won	Lost	Win %	Result
2016	Antonio Sandoval	3	3	.500	3rd (League)	–	–	–	–
2017	José Campuzano	4	3	.571	2nd (Central)	0	1	.000	Lost Central Division Championship at (Mayas) 18–48
2018	Rafael Duk	4	3	.571	2nd (Central)	2	0	1.000	Won Central Division Championship at (Mayas) 27–17; Won Tazón México III (vs Raptors) 17–0
2019	Enrique Zárate	2	6	.250	4th (Central)	–	–	–	–
2020	Héctor Toxqui	2	3	.400	2nd (Central)	Season cancelled due to the COVID-19 pandemic			
2021	Season cancelled due to the COVID-19 pandemic								
2022	Héctor Toxqui	4	2	.667	3rd (League)	0	1	.000	Lost Wild Card round (Gallos Negros) 7–14
2023	Héctor Toxqui	3	7	.300	8th (League)	–	–	–	–
Total		23	27	.460		2	2	.500	

== Championships ==
=== Tazón México championships ===
Year	Coach	Location	Opponent	Score	Record
2018	Rafael Duk	Estadio Azul (Mexico City)	Raptors de Naucalpan	17–0	6–3

== Notable players ==
See Category:Mexicas de la Ciudad de México players
