= Dinos de Saltillo =

Mexican American football team

- Current season
Logo

General information
- Founded: 28 September 2016; 9 years ago
- Stadium: Estadio Jorge A. Castro Medina
- Headquartered: Saltillo, Mexico
- Colours: Purple, black, turquoise and white

Personnel
- Owner: Francisco Javier Orozco
- Head coach: Javier Adame

Nickname
- La Ola Morada (The Purple Tide)

League / conference affiliations
- Liga de Fútbol Americano Profesional

Championships
- League/ Division Titles: 0 North Division: 2018; League: 2022

Dinos de Saltillo (English: Saltillo Dinos) are an American football team based in Saltillo, Mexico. The Dinos compete in the Liga de Fútbol Americano Profesional, the top American football league in Mexico. The team plays its home games at the Estadio Francisco I. Madero.

== History ==
The team was founded on 28 September 2016 as an expansion team in the Liga de Fútbol Americano Profesional (LFA), paying homage to the semi-professional team with a similar name that played in the Liga Nacional de Futbol Americano Masters from 1995 to 1996 in the city of Saltillo.

The team participated in the LFA for the first time in the 2017 season. Under head coach Guillermo Ruiz Burguete, the team finished with a 2–5 record, nevertheless, due to the competition system, Dinos still classified for playoffs and defeated Raptors for the North Division championship, classifying for the Tazón México in their first year in the league. The Dinos lost the Tazón México to the Mayas 18–24, played at the Estadio Jesús Martínez "Palillo" in Mexico City.

A new coaching staff arrived to the team for the 2018 season, led by head coach Carlos Cabral. The Dinos had a 4–3 regular season record, qualifying to the playoffs for second consecutive season, this time as division leader. In a rematch of the 2017 game, Dinos lost 6–21 to Raptors in the Division Championship game.

=== Javier Adame era (2019–present) ===
In May 2018, Dinos signed Javier Adame as head coach, ahead of the 2019 season. Adame had previously worked as offensive line coordinator for the Dinos.

From its inception until 2021, the Dinos played their home games at the Estadio Olímpico Francisco I. Madero. In 2022, due to an agreement between the Dinos and the baseball club Saraperos de Saltillo of the Mexican League, the team moved to the Estadio Francisco I. Madero.

In the 2022 season, the Dinos had finished with the best record in the regular season. In the playoffs, Saltillo lost to the Gallos Negros de Querétaro.

== Rivals ==
=== Fundidores de Monterrey ===
The Fundidores and the Dinos are from northern Mexico and divisional rivals since the establishment of the divisional system in the LFA in 2017. Besides that, the rivalry dates back to the times of the Liga Nacional de Futbol Americano (National American Football League) in the late 90s, when both cities (Saltillo and Monterrey) had fierce matches between their two teams: the Dinosaurios (Dinosaurs) and the Cerveceros (Brewers). The rivalry goes beyond the gridiron, since both teams fight season after season to get the best college players from Nuevo León and Coahuila.

Dinos de Saltillo vs. Fundidores de Monterrey season-by-season results
Season	Results	Location	Overall series
2017	Dinos; 33–16	Estadio Olímpico Francisco I. Madero	Dinos; 1–0
2017	Fundidores; 14–6	Estadio Tecnológico	Tie; 1–1
2018	Fundidores; 17–0	Estadio Nuevo León Unido	Fundidores; 2–1
2018	Dinos; 30–20	Estadio Olímpico Francisco I. Madero	Tie; 2–2
2019	Fundidores; 26–13	Estadio Nuevo León Unido	Fundidores; 3–2
2019	Dinos; 8–0	Estadio Olímpico Francisco I. Madero	Tie; 3–3
2020	Dinos; 23–15	Estadio Borregos	Dinos; 4–3
2022	Dinos; 24–17	Estadio Francisco I. Madero	Dinos; 5–3
2023	Dinos; 38–31	Estadio Francisco I. Madero	Dinos; 6–3
2023	Fundidores; 55–34	Estadio Borregos	Dinos; 6–4

=== Raptors de Naucalpan ===
The Raptors de Naucalpan and the Dinos play each season the so-called Jurassic Duel (Spanish: Duelo Jurásico). Due to these teams being two of the strongest in the league in recent years, this rivalry is considered amongst LFA's most important rivalries.

Dinos de Saltillo vs. Raptors de Naucalpan season-by-season results
Season	Results	Location	Overall series
2017	Raptors; 34–27	Estadio Jesús Martínez "Palillo"	Raptors; 1–0
2017	Raptors; 19–6	Estadio Olímpico de Saltillo	Raptors; 2–0
2017	Dinos; 13–10	Estadio Jesús Martínez "Palillo"	Raptors; 2–1
2018	Dinos; 29–27	Estadio José Ortega Martínez	Tie; 2–2
2018	Dinos; 23–20	Estadio Olímpico de Saltillo	Dinos; 3–2
2018	Raptors; 21–6	Estadio Olímpico de Saltillo	Tie; 3–3
2019	Raptors; 21–7	Estadio Olímpico de Saltillo	Raptors; 4–3
2019	Raptors; 19–7	Estadio FES Acatlán	Raptors; 5–3
2020	Dinos; 30–29	Estadio Olímpico de Saltillo	Raptors; 5–4
2022	Raptors; 28–27	Estadio FES Acatlán	Raptors; 6–4
2023	Dinos; 24–14	Estadio Francisco I. Madero	Raptors; 6–5

== Season-by-season ==
Season	Head coach	Regular season				Postseason			
Season	Head coach	Won	Lost	Win %	Finish	Won	Lost	Win %	Result
2017	Guillermo Ruiz Burguete	2	5	.286	2nd (North)	1	1	.500	Won North Division Championship (at Raptors) 13–10; Lost Tazón México II (vs Mayas) 24–18
2018	Carlos Cabral	4	3	.571	1st (North)	0	1	.000	Lost North Division Championship (at Raptors) 21–6
2019	Javier Adame	3	5	.375	3rd (North)	–	–	–	–
2020	Javier Adame	3	2	.600	2nd (North)	Postseason cancelled due to the COVID-19 pandemic			
2021	Season cancelled due to the COVID-19 pandemic								
2022	Javier Adame	5	1	.833	1st (League)	0	1	.000	Lost Semifinals (vs Gallos Negros) 20–27
2023	Javier Adame	7	3	.700	2nd (League)	1	1	.500	Won Semifinals (vs Reyes) 17–10; Lost Tazón México VI (vs Caudillos) 0–10
2024	Javier Adame	4	4	.500	4th (League)	0	1	.500	Lost Wild Card round at (Fundidores) 17–26
Total		28	23	.550		2	5	.286	

== Awards ==
- North Division
  - Champions (1): (2017)

== Notable players ==
See Category:Dinos de Saltillo players
