= 2007 ONEFA season =

The 2007 ONEFA season was the 77th season of college football in Mexico organized by ONEFA. The Big-12 conference was divided into three divisions (Cayetano Garza, Jacinto Licea and José Roberto Espinosa), with the top team in each division plus three wildcards qualifying for the playoffs. The Borregos Toluca were disqualified from the play-offs for fielding an ineligible player in a preseason game against the Aztecas UDLAP.

The Borregos Salvajes Monterrey won their fourth consecutive ONEFA national championship after defeating the Borregos Salvajes CEM 36–14 in the final.

== Big-12 ==
Cayetano Garza Division
| Team | G | W | L | D | PCT | PF | PA | AVG |
| Borregos Monterrey | 9 | 9 | 0 | 0 | 1.000 | 372 | 154 | 2.57 |
| Borregos CEM | 9 | 8 | 1 | 0 | 0.889 | 357 | 84 | 4.25 |
| Borregos CCM | 9 | 4 | 5 | 0 | 0.444 | 165 | 221 | 0.75 |
| Aztecas UDLA | 9 | 3 | 6 | 0 | 0.333 | 153 | 143 | 1.07 |
Jacinto Licea Division
| Team | G | W | L | D | PCT | PF | PA | AVG |
| Pumas UNAM | 9 | 7 | 2 | 0 | 0.778 | 237 | 147 | 1.61 |
| Borregos Toluca | 9 | 6 | 3 | 0 | 0.667 | 285 | 192 | 1.49 |
| Águilas Blancas IPN | 9 | 4 | 5 | 0 | 0.444 | 156 | 198 | 0.79 |
| Auténticos Tigres UANL | 9 | 4 | 5 | 0 | 0.444 | 171 | 161 | 1.06 |
José Roberto Espinosa Division
| Team | G | W | L | D | PCT | PF | PA | AVG |
| Linces UVM | 9 | 4 | 5 | 0 | 0.444 | 126 | 155 | 0.81 |
| Frailes Tepeyac | 9 | 3 | 6 | 0 | 0.333 | 140 | 271 | 0.52 |
| Centinelas CGP | 9 | 1 | 8 | 0 | 0.111 | 119 | 278 | 0.43 |
| Aguilas UACH | 9 | 1 | 8 | 0 | 0.111 | 132 | 418 | 0.32 |

Aguilas UACH will play on the National Conference in 2008.

== Results ==
=== Week 1 ===
September 1
| September 1 | Linces | 16-13 | Centinelas | Stadium: Joaquin Amaro Stadium; Attendance: Hour: 11:00 |

September 1
| September 1 | Frailes | 52-6 | Aguilas | Stadium: Unidad Deportiva Sierra Hermosa; Attendance: Hour: 12:00 |

September 1
| September 1 | Borregos Toluca | 12-30 | Borregos CEM | Stadium: La Congeladora; Attendance: Hour: 12:00 |

September 1
| September 1 | Pumas | 17-6 | Borregos CCM | Stadium: Mexico 68; Attendance: Hour: 12:00 |

September 1
| September 1 | Aztecas | 14-3 | Auténticos Tigres | Stadium: Templo del dolor Attendance: Hour: 12:00 |

September 1
| September 1 | Aguilas Blancas | 19-27 | Borregos Monterrey | Stadium: Joaquin Amaro Stadium; Attendance: Hour: 15:00 |

=== Week 2 ===
September 7
| September 7 | Pumas | 44-30 | Aguilas UACH | Stadium: Mexico 68; Attendance: Hour: 19:00 |

September 7
| September 7 | Autenticos Tigres | 50-3 | Frailes | Stadium: Estadio Gaspar Mass; Attendance: Hour: 19:00 |

September 8
| September 8 | Aguilas Blancas | 24-7 | Centinelas | Stadium: Joaquin Amaro; Attendance: Hour: 11:00 |

September 8
| September 8 | Aztecas | 6-22 | Borregos CEM | Stadium: Templo del Dolor; Attendance: Hour: 12:00 |

September 8
| September 8 | Linces | 10-16 | Borregos Toluca | Stadium: Joaquin Amaro; Attendance: Hour: 15:00 |

September 8
| September 8 | Borregos MTY | 47-23 | Borregos CCM | Stadium: Tecnologico; Attendance: Hour: 19:00 |

=== Week 3 ===
September 14
| September 14 | Autenticos Tigres | 0-17 | Aguilas Blancas | Stadium: Gaspar Mass; Attendance: Hour: 19:00 |

September 14
| September 14 | Aguilas UACH | 3-88 | Borregos CEM | Stadium: Olimpico; Attendance: Hour: 19:00 |

September 15
| September 15 | Linces | 20-16 | Aztecas | Stadium: Joaquin Amaro; Attendance: Hour: 11:00 |

September 15
| September 15 | Pumas | 27-36 | Borregos Toluca | Stadium: Mexico 68; Attendance: Hour: 12:00 |

September 15
| September 15 | Frailes | 14-49 | Borregos Mty | Stadium: UD Sierra Hermosa; Attendance: Hour: 12:00 |

September 15
| September 15 | Borregos CCM | 19-7 | Centinelas | Stadium: Estadio CCM; Attendance: Hour: 12:00 |

=== Week 4 ===
September 21
| September 21 | Borregos Mty | 80-13 | Aguilas | Stadium: Tecnológico; Attendance: Hour: 19:00 |

September 22
| September 22 | Aguilas Blancas | 35-34 (aet) | Borregos Toluca | Stadium: Joaquin Amaro; Attendance: Hour: 12:00 |

September 22
| September 22 | Borregos CCM | 23-21 | Linces | Stadium: CCM; Attendance: Hour: 12:00 |

September 22
| September 22 | Borregos CEM | 39-0 | Frailes | Stadium: La Congeladora; Attendance: Hour: 12:00 |

September 22
| September 22 | Pumas | 20-7 | Autenticos Tigres | Stadium: México 68; Attendance: Hour: 12:00 |

September 22
| September 22 | Aztecas | 37-7 | Centinelas | Stadium: Templo del Dolor; Attendance: Hour: 12:00 |

=== Week 5 ===
September 28
| September 28 | Borregos Mty | 44-14 | Auténticos Tigres | Stadium: Tecnológico; Attendance: Hour: 19:00 |

September 28
| September 28 | Aguilas UACH | 3-10 | Linces UVM | Stadium: Olimpico Universitario; Attendance: Hour: 19:00 |

September 29
| September 29 | Centinelas | 19-22 | Frailes | Stadium: Joaquin Amaro; Attendance: Hour: 12:00 |

September 29
| September 29 | Borregos CEM | 17-10 | Pumas | Stadium: CEM; Attendance: Hour: 12:00 |

September 29
| September 29 | Borregos Toluca | 28-21 | Aztecas | Stadium: La Congeladora; Attendance: Hour: 12:00 |

September 29
| September 29 | Águilas Blancas | 10-13 | Borregos CCM | Stadium: Joaquin Amaro; Attendance: Hour: 15:00 |

=== Week 6 ===
October 5
| October 5 | Autenticos Tigres | 20-13 | Borregos CCM | Stadium: Gaspar Mass; Attendance: Hour: 19:00 |

October 6
| October 6 | Centinelas | 31-24 | Aguilas UACH | Stadium: Joaquin Amaro; Attendance: Hour: 12:00 |

October 6
| October 6 | Borregos Toluca | 28-38 | Borregos Mty | Stadium:La Congeladora; Attendance: Hour: 12:00 |

October 6
| October 6 | Frailes | 7-16 | Linces | Stadium: Sierra Hermosa; Attendance: Hour: 12:00 |

October 6
| October 6 | Borregos CEM | 48-6 | Aguilas Blancas | Stadium: CEM; Attendance: Hour: 12:00 |

October 6
| October 6 | Pumas | 20-13 (aet) | Aztecas | Stadium: Olímpico Universitario; Attendance: Hour: 12:00 |

=== Week 7 ===
October 12
| October 12 | Borregos MTY | 20-13 | Borregos CEM | Stadium: Tecnológico; Attendance: Hour: 19:00 |

October 13
| October 13 | Linces | 14-21 | Tigres | Stadium: Joaquin Amaro; Attendance: Hour: 11:00 |

October 13
| October 13 | Borregos Toluca | 62-7 | Aguilas | Stadium:La Congeladora; Attendance: Hour: 12:00 |

October 13
| October 13 | Borregos CCM | 19-16 | Aztecas | Stadium: CCM; Attendance: Hour: 12:00 |

October 13
| October 13 | Frailes | 25-17 | Aguilas Blancas | Stadium: UD Sierra Hermosa; Attendance: Hour: 12:00 |

October 13
| October 13 | Pumas | 49-12 | Centinelas | Stadium: Olímpico Universitario; Attendance: Hour: 12:00 |

=== Week 8 ===
October 19
| October 19 | Autenticos Tigres | 14-18 | Borregos Toluca | Stadium: Gaspar Mass; Attendance: Hour: 19:00 |

October 19
| October 19 | Aguilas UACH | 31-30 | Borregos CCM | Stadium: Olímpico; Attendance: Hour: 19:00 |

October 20
| October 20 | Aztecas | 20-7 | Frailes | Stadium: El Templo del Dolor; Attendance: Hour: 12:00 |

October 20
| October 20 | Centinelas | 2-45 | Borregos Mty | Stadium:Joaquin Amaro; Attendance: Hour: 12:00 |

October 20
| October 20 | Borregos CEM | 35-0 | Linces | Stadium: CEM; Attendance: Hour: 12:00 |

October 21
| October 21 | Aguilas Blancas | 7-29 | Pumas | Stadium: Foro Sol; Attendance: Hour: 12:00 |

=== Week 9 ===
October 26
| October 26 | Aguilas UACH | 15-21 | Aguilas Blancas | Stadium: Olímpico; Attendance: Hour: 19:00 |

October 27
| October 27 | Centinelas | 21-42 | Autenticos Tigres | Stadium:Joaquin Amaro; Attendance: Hour: 11:00 |

October 27
| October 27 | Borregos CCM | 19-52 | Borregos CEM | Stadium: CCM; Attendance: Hour: 12:00 |

October 27
| October 27 | Aztecas | 6-17 | Borregos Mty | Stadium: El Templo del Dolor; Attendance: Hour: 12:00 |

October 27
| October 27 | Borregos Toluca | 10-51 | Frailes | Stadium: La Congeladora; Attendance: Hour: 12:00 |

October 28
| October 28 | Linces | 19-21 | Pumas | Stadium: Joaquin Amaro; Attendance: Hour: 12:00 |

== Play-offs ==
Quarterfinals
Linces | 9
Autenticos Tigres | 10
Pumas | 21
Aguilas Blancas | 28

Semifinals
Borregos Mty | 31
Autenticos Tigres | 10
Borregos CEM | 63
Aguilas Blancas | 13

Finals
Borregos Mty | 36
Borregos CEM | 14

=== Wildcards ===
November 3
| November 3 | Pumas | 21-28 | Aguilas Blancas | Stadium: Olímpico; Attendance: Hour: 10:00 |

November 4
| November 4 | Linces | 9-10 | Autenticos Tigres | Stadium: Joaquín Amaro; Attendance: Hour: 11:00 |

=== Semifinals ===
November 9
| November 9 | Autenticos Tigres | 10-31 | Borregos Mty | Stadium: Estadio Tecnológico; Attendance: Hour: 19:00 |

November 10
| November 10 | Aguilas Blancas | 13-63 | Borregos CEM | Stadium: CEM; Attendance: Hour: 12:00 |

=== Final ===
November 16
| November 16 | Borregos CEM | 14-36 | Borregos Mty | Stadium: Estadio Tecnológico; Attendance: Hour: 19:00 |

== Aztec Bowl ==
On December 8 the 37th Aztec Bowl was played in Chihuahua City. The ONEFA All-Stars were defeated by the NCAA Division III All-Stars by a score of 37–19 in front of 18,500 spectators at the Estadio Olímpico Universitario. Enrique Borda Tovar (ITESM-CEM) coached the Mexican team.

Additionally, the Chihuahua Bowl was played between the National Conference All-Stars and Eastern Arizona College (EAC) on December 5, with Eastern Arizona winning 35–9. EAC running back Tony Reid was named the game's MVP after rushing for 130 yards and two touchdowns.

== See also ==
- ONEFA
