= Antonio Zamora =

Mexican gridiron football coach (born 1982)

Current position
- Title: Head coach
- Team: Auténticos Tigres UANL

Biographical details
- Born: 14 June 1982 (age 44); Monterrey, Mexico

Playing career
- 2001–2005: UANL
- Position: Quarterback

Coaching career (HC unless noted)
- 2007: UANL (QB)
- 2008–2015: UANL (intermedia team)
- 2016–: UANL

Accomplishments and honors

Awards
- ONEFA Rookie of the Year (2001)

Antonio Zamora
Medal record

Men's American football

Representing Mexico

World Championship
Silver medal – second place	2003 Germany	Team

Juan Antonio Zamora Montemayor (born 14 June 1982) is a Mexican gridiron football coach and former player. He is the current head football coach at the Autonomous University of Nuevo León (UANL), his alma mater. As head coach, he led the Auténticos Tigres to a national championship in 2025.

== Early life and playing career ==
Zamora was born on 14 June 1982 in Monterrey, Nuevo León. He began playing American football at a young age in the AFAIM with the Vikingos del Fraccionamiento Bernardo Reyes. (Note: Sources disagree over the amount of time Zamora played for the Vikingos. It has been alternatively reported as 14 years and 12 years.) Zamora attended Preparatoria No. 2 de la UANL, where he played high school football for the Vaqueros as a quarterback. He enrolled at the Autonomous University of Nuevo León (UANL), studying electrical engineering. Zamora represented the Faculty of Mechanical and Electrical Engineering (FIME) as a member of the Osos de FIME in the UANL Intra-University Football League, leading the team to a league title in 2000. He also played against other schools with the Tigres UANL in both the juvenil (18 and under) and intermedia (20 and under) categories, going undefeated at home with both teams. Zamora led the juvenil team to a national championship in 1998 after throwing four touchdown passes in the final. Then, in 2001, he led the intermedia team to its first-ever national championship title, throwing a 79-yard touchdown pass in the fourth quarter of the final to seal the 20–12 win.

=== College career ===
Zamora played college football in Liga Mayor for the Auténticos Tigres UANL from 2001 to 2005. He also received scholarship offers from the Aztecas UDLAP and Borregos Salvajes Monterrey, but stated that it was a dream since childhood to play for the Auténticos Tigres. Zamora was a traditional pocket passer, noted for his skilled arm and poise under center.

Following an injury to starter Rolando Piña, Zamora made his first Liga Mayor start in week five of the 2001 season. He threw three touchdown passes in a 44–43 comeback win over the Aztecas UDLAP – their first win ever over UDLAP – and was named the ONEFA player of the week. Zamora helped UANL reach the national championship game, but he exited the game with a fractured clavicle in a 20–12 loss to the Borregos Salvajes Monterrey. He was named the ONEFA Rookie of the Year after throwing for 1,456 yards and 10 touchdowns on the season.

Zamora led the Auténticos Tigres back to the national championship game in 2002, where they lost again to the Borregos Salvajes Monterrey. In the 2003 season opener, he threw for 292 yards and two touchdowns in a 20–17 win over the Borregos Laguna. In the regular season finale, Zamora tossed two touchdowns in a 20–14 overtime loss to the archrival Borregos Salvajes Monterrey. The two teams faced off again the following week in the semi-finals. Zamora threw two touchdown passes in a 31–16 loss in front of 28,000 spectators at the Estadio Tecnológico, as UANL was knocked out of the playoffs by Monterrey for the third year in a row.

Zamora opened his fourth season in 2004 by throwing four touchdown passes in a 53–0 win over the Pumas Acatlán. However, he suffered a sprained left knee the following week in a game against the Frailes del Tepeyac, forcing him to undergo surgery. After more than a month on the sidelines, Zamora made his return in mid-October against the Pumas CU and threw two touchdown passes in a 31–13 win. In his next game, he caught a 43-yard touchdown pass from teammate David Adkins in a 20–17 loss to the Borregos Toluca. A week later in the regular season finale, Zamora threw the game-winning touchdown pass to Omar Vélez in an 18–17 win over the Borregos Salvajes Monterrey, snapping a 16-game skid against their rivals. However, UANL failed to qualify for the playoffs.

In the 2005 season opener, Zamora threw four touchdowns in a 42–8 win over the Águilas UACH. Later that month, he tossed a pair of first-half touchdowns against the Borregos CCM before he re-aggravated his left knee and exited the game. Zamora recovered in time for their next game, and even scored a rushing touchdown in the 18–10 loss to the Borregos Salvajes CEM. Two weeks later, he threw six touchdown passes in a 42–7 win over the Pumas Acatlán. However, Zamora re-aggravated his knee yet again in the first half of their next game against the Borregos Salvajes Toluca. Despite him missing the last two regular season games, the Auténticos Tigres qualified for the playoffs. Zamora returned in time for the playoffs, throwing a 61-yard touchdown pass to Carlos Samaniego in a 20–6 semi-final win over the Borregos Salvajes CEM in front of a record crowd of 14,000 at the renovated Estadio Gaspar Mass. UANL lost to their rivals, the Borregos Salvajes Monterrey, in the national title game.

Zamora finished his career with 64 passing touchdowns, which at the time ranked fourth in ONEFA history behind Carlos Altamirano (84), Enrique Villanueva (83), and Horacio Juárez (73). (Note: The 64-touchdown mark was reported before Zamora's touchdown pass in UANL's semi-final win over the Borregos Salvajes CEM. It is unclear whether it includes playoff touchdown passes from previous seasons. If so, Zamora's total would be 65 touchdowns.)

=== National team career ===
Shortly after the 2001 college season, Zamora was chosen to represent Mexico in the 2002 Tazón de la Amistad (Friendship Bowl) against Japan, a rematch of the 1999 IFAF World Championship final. He threw a touchdown pass to Rodrigo Guzmán in a 27–24 loss.

Zamora was called up to the Mexico national team again ahead of the 2003 IFAF World Championship, held in Germany. As the second-string quarterback to Carlos Altamirano, he threw for 123 yards and two touchdowns in Mexico's 21–17 win over the host team, Germany in the semi-finals. Zamora was made the starter for the final two days later, throwing for 115 yards and one touchdown with two interceptions in a 34–14 loss to Japan.

Following his final collegiate season in 2005, Zamora was one of 65 players selected to represent the Mexican All-Stars in the 35th Aztec Bowl against a team of NCAA Division III All-Stars. He threw an interception in a 53–15 loss at the Estadio Universitario Alberto "Chivo" Córdoba.

== Coaching career ==
=== Early roles ===
Zamora began his coaching career while his playing career was still ongoing, serving as an assistant at his boyhood club, the Vikingos, and at his former high school, Preparatoria No. 2. He later joined the coaching staff of the Osos de FIME, the intra-university team representing the UANL Faculty of Mechanical and Electrical Engineering (FIME).

In February 2006, a 23-year old Zamora was named the successor to legendary head coach Mike Cervantes as head coach of the Osos de FIME. He had previously played under Cervantes during his own time as a player on the team. In his first game at the helm, Zamora led the FIME to a 27–7 win over the Faculty of Architecture. That season, he led the team to a semifinal appearance. In 2007, Zamora won his first title as a coach after leading FIME to a 28–0 win over Architecture in the intra-university league final. His younger brother, César, threw all four touchdown passes. In 2008, Zamora led FIME to a perfect season and another title, beating Civil Engineering, 41–21, in the final. He remained as head coach of the team until 2015.

In 2008, Zamora took on the additional role of head coach of the Tigres UANL intermedia (20 and under) team. In his first game as head coach, he guided the team to a 40–20 win over the Borregos CEM. The Tigres reached the final that season, but then missed the playoffs in 2009. Zamora guided the Tigres back to the final in 2010, where they lost to the Pumas UNAM. In 2011, he led the team to a perfect season and its second-ever national championship title, beating the Pumas UNAM 28–26 in the final. The Tigres reached the final in 2012 as well, but lost to the Pumas UNAM. Zamora led the team to another perfect season in 2013, capped off by a 27–24 win over the Linces UVM in the final. The teams faced off again in the 2014 final; the Tigres won the rematch, 41–22. Zamora led the Tigres to its third national title in a row in 2015. They faced the Linces UVM in the final, also for the third year in a row, and secured the 28–21 victory.

=== Auténticos Tigres UANL ===
In November 2006, Zamora was floated as a candidate to replace a departing Edmundo Reyes as head coach of the Auténticos Tigres UANL in Liga Mayor. He was not chosen for the job, which went to Pedro Morales, and was instead named the team's quarterbacks coach for the 2007 season. (Note: At least one source claim he remained in the role through the 2008 season, but his curriculum vitae on the UANL website lists only the 2007 season.)

In January 2016, Zamora was named the new head coach of the Auténticos Tigres UANL, replacing an outgoing Morales.

== Personal life ==
Zamora was nicknamed "El Jefe" dating back to his playing days. He earned his Licentiate degree in electronic engineering and communications in 2004, followed by a master's degree in industrial administration in 2006, both from UANL.
