= 2023 Borregos Salvajes Monterrey football team =

Mexican college American football season

2023 Borregos Salvajes Monterrey football

ONEFA national champion

Conferencia 14 Grandes championship game, W 31–27 vs. Auténticos Tigres UANL
- Conference: Conferencia 14 Grandes
- Record: 10–1 (7–1 14 Grandes)
- Head coach: Carlos Altamirano (6th full, 7th overall season)
- Captain: Mauricio Martínez
- Home stadium: Estadio Borregos

2023 Conferencia 14 Grandes standings
	Conf.			Overall
Team	W		L	W		L
Grupo A
Borregos Salvajes MTY xy$^	7	–	1	10	–	1
Borregos Puebla ^	6	–	2	6	–	3
Pumas CU ^	4	–	4	5	–	5
Borregos CCM ^	4	–	4	4	–	5
Burros Blancos IPN	3	–	5	3	–	5
Borregos Guadalajara	1	–	7	1	–	7
Aztecas UDLAP	1	–	7	1	–	7
Grupo B
Auténticos Tigres UANL xy^	7	–	1	9	–	2
Águilas Blancas IPN ^	7	–	1	7	–	2
Leones Anáhuac Norte ^	5	–	3	6	–	4
Pumas Acatlán ^	4	–	4	4	–	5
Borregos CEM	4	–	4	4	–	4
Linces UVM	3	–	5	3	–	5
Potros Salvajes UAEM	0	–	8	0	–	8
Championship: Borregos Salvajes Monterrey 31, Auténticos Tigres UANL 27
$ – Conference champion; x – Division champion/co-champions; y – Championship game participant; ^ – Playoff participant

The 2023 Borregos Salvajes Monterrey football team represented the Monterrey Institute of Technology and Higher Education (ITESM) in the 2023 ONEFA Liga Mayor season. The Borregos Salvajes competed in the top-tier Conferencia 14 Grandes and played their home games at the Estadio Borregos in Monterrey. They were led by head coach Carlos Altamirano in his sixth full season and seventh overall since taking over midway through the 2016 season. (Note: The 2020 ONEFA season was not held due to the COVID-19 pandemic in Mexico.)

The Borregos Salvajes compiled a 10–1 record (7–1 in conference games) and won the ONEFA Liga Mayor national championship by defeating the Auténticos Tigres UANL in the Conferencia 14 Grandes championship game. It was the program's second consecutive national championship under Altamirano.

The Borregos Salvajes led the Conferencia 14 Grandes during the regular season in both total offense (427.8 yards per game) and total defense (235.8 yards per game). The team tallied a conference-best 3,422 yards in the regular season (2,551 passing, 871 rushing). They were led on offense by quarterback Fernando Sarabia, who completed 151 of 250 pass attempts for 1,955 yards and 12 touchdowns during the regular season. Additionally, defensive back Patricio Santisteban led the conference with six interceptions while kicker Leonardo Guajardo won the scoring title with 80 points scored (29 extra points, 17 field goals).

== Offseason ==
=== 2023 LFA draft ===
The 2023 Liga de Fútbol Americano Profesional (LFA) draft was held on 7 January 2023. The following Borregos Salvajes Monterrey players were selected.

Round	Pick	Team	Player	Position	Ref.
1	2	Dinos de Saltillo	Julio Covarrubias	RB	
1	5	Fundidores de Monterrey	Isaac Cuevas	OL	

== Schedule ==
The Borregos Salvajes' 2023 schedule consisted of four home games, three away games, and one neutral site game in the regular season. They also hosted two of their three postseason games, with the national championship game being hosted by the Auténticos Tigres UANL.

The team opened their season with a matchup against rivals Auténticos Tigres UANL at NRG Stadium in Houston, Texas. The game, presented as the inaugural Mexican College Football Showcase, was jointly organized by the Houston Texans and NFL México, and commemorated the 80th and 90th anniversaries of ITESM and UANL, respectively. It was the first-ever ONEFA regular season game held in the United States, as well as the first time the Clásico regio estudiantil rivalry game was played outside of the Monterrey metropolitan area.

Date	Time	Opponent	Site	Result	Attendance	Source
8 September	7:00 p.m.	vs. Auténticos Tigres UANL	NRG Stadium; Houston, Texas (Clásico regio estudiantil, Mexican College Football Showcase)	L 13–10	>8,000	
22 September	7:30 p.m.	Borregos Puebla	Estadio Borregos; Monterrey	W 23–20		
29 September	5:00 p.m.	at Borregos CCM	Estadio Disney CCM; Mexico City	W 31–7		
6 October	5:00 p.m.	at Borregos Guadalajara	La Fortaleza Azul; Zapopan	W 33–0		
13 October	7:30 p.m.	Burros Blancos IPN	Estadio Borregos; Monterrey	W 37–0		
20 October	7:30 p.m.	Pumas CU	Estadio Borregos; Monterrey	W 41–21		
28 October	1:00 p.m.	at Aztecas UDLAP	Estadio Templo del Dolor; San Andrés Cholula	W 42–14		
3 November	7:00 p.m.	at Borregos CEM	Corral de Plástico; Ciudad López Mateos	W 37–20		
10 November	7:30 p.m.	Borregos CCM	Estadio Borregos; Monterrey (ONEFA 14 Grandes quarterfinal)	W 49–18		
18 November	7:30 p.m.	Leones Anáhuac Norte	Estadio Borregos; Monterrey (ONEFA 14 Grandes semifinal)	W 59–7		
24 November	7:00 p.m.	at Auténticos Tigres UANL	Estadio Gaspar Mass; San Nicolás de los Garza (ONEFA 14 Grandes championship game, Clásico regio estudiantil)	W 31–27	>15,000	

== Roster ==
2023 Borregos Salvajes Monterrey football team roster
Players
Coaches
Offense

Pos.	#	Name	Class
RB	6	Mauro Cavallarí
WR	11	Héctor Ramírez
QB	13	Daniel de Alba
QB	15	Fernando Sarabia
WR	16	Miguel Lozano
QB	17	Cristian Corral
WR	18	Derek Flores
QB	19	Víctor Palacios
RB	21	Alí Flores
RB	26	Nicolás Villagómez
RB	31	José Hugo González
RB	32	Alejandro Cruz
RB	34	Carlos Emiliano Martínez
RB	35	Rocco Villarreal
OL	51	Jorge Ignacio Martínez Cairo
OL	56	Steven Zambrano
OL	58	Manuel Canales
OL	70	Sebastián Díaz
OL	72	Fernando García
OL	74	Miguel Salazar
OL	75	Pedro García
OL	77	Mariano Bautista
OL	78	Víctor Tiburcio Pérez
OL	79	Diogo Fernández
WR	80	Erick Landeros
WR	81	Jorge Alberto Casian
WR	82	Mauricio Santos
WR	83	Daniel Santos
WR	84	Rolando Cueva
WR	85	Luis Pulido
WR	86	Sergio Patricio Fernández
WR	87	Fabio Palmero
WR	88	Eduardo Ortega

Defense

Pos.	#	Name	Class
LB	0	Fernando Contreras
DL	1	Marco Antillón
LB	2	Mauricio Martínez (C)
SS	3	Fabrizzio Mejía
FS	4	Santiago Castañeda
CB	5	Iván Covarrubias
DL	7	Mikel Delgado
DL	9	Diego Sánchez
LB	10	Rodrigo Aceves
DL	12	Eugenio Pedraza
FS	14	Joel Ceseña
CB	20	Juan Antonio Saint André
CB	22	Salvador Andrade
SS	23	Alonso Gaxiola
SS	25	Ovidio Varela
CB	27	Renzo Bibiano
SS	28	Juan Pablo Santisteban
SS	29	Patricio Santisteban
CB	30	Eduardo Castillo
DL	33	Adrián Patricio Flores
CB	36	Helaman González
CB	37	Pablo Islas
CB	38	Paulo Aranalde
FS	39	Gabriel Rivera
LB	42	Rodrigo Fernández
CB	43	Alejandro Cabello
DL	44	José Francisco López
LB	45	Rubén Rodríguez
DL	46	Elías Richo
LB	52	Emilio Carrillo
DL	54	Ángel Díaz
LB	55	Eduardo Emilio Roiz
LB	57	Pablo Fabrizio Rodríguez
DL	97	Óscar Soto
DL	99	Eduardo Scully

Special teams

Pos.	#	Name	Class
P	8	Jesús Aguirre
PK	24	Leonardo Guajardo

Head coach

- Carlos Altamirano

Coordinators/assistant coaches

Legend

- (C) Team captain
- (S) Suspended
- (I) Ineligible
- Injured
- Redshirt

Roster

== Awards and honors ==
Annual Awards
Player	Award	Ceremony	Date Awarded	Ref.
Fernando Sarabia	Eduardo "Pocho" Herrera Player of the Year	Cascos de Oro	2 March 2024	
Leonardo Guajardo	José Guzmán Veracomo Specialist of the Year	Cascos de Oro	2 March 2024	
Carlos Altamirano	Roberto "Tapatío" Méndez Coach of the Year	Cascos de Oro	2 March 2024	
Carlos Altamirano	Coach of the Year	ONEFA 2024; Kickoff Awards	27 August 2024	

Equipo Ideal All-México
Player	Position	Team
Mauricio Santos	WR	First Team
Eduardo Ortega	WR	First Team
Steven Zambrano	OL	First Team
Pedro García	OL	First Team
Rodrigo Aceves	Edge	First Team
Marco Antillón	DL	First Team
Mauricio Martínez	LB	First Team
Fabrizzio Mejía	LB (Note: Hybrid)	First Team
Alonso Gaxiola	DB	First Team
Patricio Santisteban	DB	First Team
Iván Covarrubias	CB	First Team
Leonardo Guajardo	PK	First Team
Miguel Salazar	OL	Second Team
Manuel Canales	OL	Second Team

=== Aztec Bowl ===
The following players were selected to represent the ONEFA All-Stars in the 48th Aztec Bowl on 1 December.

- Rodrigo Aceves (LB)
- Jesús Aguirre (P)
- Marco Antillón (DL)
- Renzo Bibiano (CB)
- Manuel Canales (OL)
- Santiago Castañeda (FS)
- Mauro Cavallari (RB)
- Fernando Contreras (LB)
- Iván Covarrubias (CB)
- Alejandro Cruz (RB)
- Mikel Delgado (DL)
- Fernando García (OL)
- Pedro García (OL)
- Alonso Gaxiola (SS)
- Leonardo Guajardo (PK)
- José Francisco López (DL)
- Miguel Lozano (WR)
- Mauricio Martínez (LB)
- Fabrizzio Mejía (SS)
- Eduardo Ortega (WR)
- Eugenio Pedraza (DL)
- Luis Pulido (WR)
- Miguel Salazar (OL)
- Diego Sánchez (DL)
- Daniel Santos (WR)
- Mauricio Santos (WR)
- Fernando Sarabia (QB)
- Óscar Soto (DL)
- Steven Zambrano (OL)

== Players drafted into the LFA ==
The 2024 LFA draft was held on 13 January 2024. The following Borregos Salvajes Monterrey players were selected.

Round	Pick	Player	Position	LFA team	Ref.
1	1	Alonso Gaxiola	DB	Jefes de Ciudad Juárez	
1	9	Elías Richo	DL	Dinos de Saltillo	
1	10	Héctor Ramírez	WR	Jefes de Ciudad Juárez	
2	20	Héctor Zepeda (Note: Zepeda last played for the Borregos Salvajes Monterrey in 2022.)	OL	Galgos de Tijuana	
3	21	Luis Pulido	WR	Fundidores de Monterrey	
4	40	Jorge Alberto Casian	WR	Caudillos de Chihuahua	
5	47	Manuel Canales	OL	Fundidores de Monterrey	
6	55	Emilio Elizondo (Note: Elizondo last played for the Borregos Salvajes Monterrey in 2022.)	QB	Galgos de Tijuana	
