= 2024 Borregos Salvajes Monterrey football team =

Mexican college American football season

2024 Borregos Salvajes Monterrey football

ONEFA national champion

Conferencia 14 Grandes championship game, W 24–21 ^{OT} vs. Auténticos Tigres UANL
- Conference: Conferencia 14 Grandes
- Record: 12–0 (9–0 14 Grandes)
- Head coach: Carlos Altamirano (7th full, 8th overall season)
- Defensive coordinator: Eduardo Araujo
- Home stadium: Estadio Borregos

2024 Conferencia 14 Grandes standings
	Conf.			Overall
Team	W		L	W		L
Borregos Salvajes MTY y$^	9	–	0	12	–	0
Auténticos Tigres UANL y^	8	–	1	10	–	2
Borregos Puebla ^	7	–	2	8	–	3
Pumas CU ^	7	–	2	8	–	3
Borregos CEM ^	6	–	3	6	–	4
Águilas Blancas IPN ^	5	–	4	5	–	5
Burros Blancos IPN ^	4	–	5	4	–	6
Linces UVM ^	4	–	5	4	–	6
Aztecas UDLAP	4	–	5	4	–	5
Borregos Guadalajara	4	–	5	4	–	5
Leones Anáhuac Norte	2	–	7	2	–	7
Borregos CCM	1	–	8	1	–	8
Pumas Acatlán	1	–	8	1	–	8
Águilas UACH	1	–	8	1	–	8
Championship: Borregos Salvajes Monterrey 24, Auténticos Tigres UANL 21^{OT}
$ – Conference champion; y – Championship game participant; ^ – Playoff participant

The 2024 Borregos Salvajes Monterrey football team represented the Monterrey Institute of Technology and Higher Education (ITESM) in the 2024 ONEFA Liga Mayor season. The Borregos Salvajes competed in the top-tier Conferencia 14 Grandes and played their home games at the Estadio Borregos in Monterrey. They were led by head coach Carlos Altamirano in his seventh full season and eighth overall since taking over midway through the 2016 season. (Note: The 2020 ONEFA season was not held due to the COVID-19 pandemic in Mexico.)

The Borregos Salvajes compiled a perfect 12–0 record (9–0 in conference games) and won the ONEFA Liga Mayor national championship by defeating the Auténticos Tigres UANL in the Conferencia 14 Grandes championship game. It was the program's third consecutive national championship under Altamirano, who played for the team in the 1990s.

The Borregos Salvajes led the Conferencia 14 Grandes during the regular season in both total offense (474.8 yards per game) and total defense (238.2 yards per game). The team tallied a conference-best 4,274 yards in the regular season (3,086 passing, 1,188 rushing). They were led on offense by quarterback Fernando Sarabia, who completed 169 of 265 pass attempts for 2,493 yards and 24 touchdowns with four interceptions during the regular season. The team's other statistical leaders on offense included wide receiver Mauricio Santos with 650 receiving yards, running back Alejandro Cruz with 197 rushing yards, and kicker Leonardo Guajardo with 72 points scored (45 extra points, nine field goals). Defensive statistical leaders included Mauricio Martínez with 43 tackles, Diego Sánchez with five sacks, and Santiago Castañeda with three interceptions.

== Offseason ==
=== 2024 LFA draft ===
The 2024 Liga de Fútbol Americano Profesional (LFA) draft was held on 13 January 2024. The following Borregos Salvajes Monterrey players were selected.

Round	Pick	Player	Position	LFA team	Ref.
1	1	Alonso Gaxiola	DB	Jefes de Ciudad Juárez	
1	9	Elías Richo	DL	Dinos de Saltillo	
1	10	Héctor Ramírez	WR	Jefes de Ciudad Juárez	
2	20	Héctor Zepeda (Note: Zepeda last played for the Borregos Salvajes Monterrey in 2022.)	OL	Galgos de Tijuana	
3	21	Luis Pulido	WR	Fundidores de Monterrey	
4	40	Jorge Alberto Casian	WR	Caudillos de Chihuahua	
5	47	Manuel Canales	OL	Fundidores de Monterrey	
6	55	Emilio Elizondo (Note: Elizondo last played for the Borregos Salvajes Monterrey in 2022.)	QB	Galgos de Tijuana	

== Preseason ==
The Borregos Salvajes opened their preseason schedule against the Lobos UAdeC of the Autonomous University of Coahuila. They later played a preseason scrimmage against Kilgore College in Kilgore, Texas, although it was included in the Rangers' win–loss record as a non-conference matchup.

Date	Time	Opponent	Site	Result	Source
12 July		at Lobos UAdeC	Estadio Jorge Castro; Saltillo	W 45–17	
24 August	7:00 p.m.	at Kilgore	R.E. St. John Memorial Stadium; Kilgore, Texas	L 9–27	

== Schedule ==
The Borregos Salvajes' 2024 schedule consisted of four home games and five away games in the regular season. They also hosted all three of their postseason games.

Date	Time	Opponent	Site	Result	Attendance	Source
7 September	6:00 p.m.	at Águilas UACH	Estadio Olímpico; Chihuahua City	W 53–17		
21 September	12:00 p.m.	at Águilas Blancas IPN	Estadio Wilfrido Massieu; Mexico City	W 36–20		
27 September	7:30 p.m.	Borregos CCM	Estadio Borregos; Monterrey	W 40–7		
4 October	7:00 p.m.	at Auténticos Tigres UANL	Estadio Gaspar Mass; San Nicolás de los Garza (Clásico regio estudiantil)	W 34–16	>12,000	
12 October	12:00 p.m.	at Linces UVM	Estadio José Ortega Martínez; Naucalpan	W 24–22		
18 October	7:30 p.m.	Borregos CEM	Estadio Borregos; Monterrey	W 39–0		
25 October	7:30 p.m.	Aztecas UDLAP	Estadio Borregos; Monterrey	W 42–17		
1 November	7:30 p.m.	Leones Anáhuac Norte	Estadio Borregos; Monterrey	W 42–9		
9 November	1:00 p.m.	at Borregos Puebla	Cráter Azul; Puebla City	W 49–10		
15 November	7:30 p.m.	Linces UVM	Estadio Borregos; Monterrey (Conferencia 14 Grandes quarterfinal)	W 54–17		
22 November	7:30 p.m.	Pumas CU	Estadio Borregos; Monterrey (Conferencia 14 Grandes semifinal)	W 49–9		
29 November	7:30 p.m.	Auténticos Tigres UANL	Estadio Borregos; Monterrey (Conferencia 14 Grandes championship game, Clásico regio estudiantil)	W 24–21 ^{OT}		

== Players drafted into the LFA ==
The 2025 LFA draft was held on 1 March 2025, while the supplementary draft (rounds five to 12) was held on 3 March. The following Borregos Salvajes Monterrey players were selected.

Round	Pick	Player	Position	LFA team	Ref.
1	2	Fernando García	OL	Reyes de Jalisco	
1	6	Fabrizzio Mejía	SS	Caudillos de Chihuahua	
1	8	Pedro García	OL	Gallos Negros de Querétaro	
2	14	Diego Sánchez	DL	Caudillos de Chihuahua	
3	22	Leonardo Guajardo	K	Caudillos de Chihuahua	
3	24	Eduardo Ortega	WR	Caudillos de Chihuahua	
4	30	Marco Antillón	DL	Caudillos de Chihuahua	
4	31	Santiago Castañeda	FS	Reyes de Jalisco	
6	46	Mauro Cavallarí	RB	Osos de Monterrey	
8	62	Jesús Aguirre	K	Osos de Monterrey	
