= Fernando Mayén =

Mexican gridiron footballer (born 2003)

Borregos Salvajes Monterrey
- Position: Running back

Personal information
- Born: 8 November 2003 (age 22); Mexico

Career information
- College: ITESM Puebla (2022–2025); ITESM (2026–present)

Awards and highlights
- ONEFA MVP (2023); ONEFA Rookie of the Year (2022)

Fernando Mayén Marín (born 8 November 2003) is a Mexican college football player for the Borregos Salvajes Monterrey. A running back, he previously played for the Borregos Puebla and was named the ONEFA Most Valuable Player in 2023.

== Early life ==
Mayén was born into an athletic family: his mother was a synchronized swimming coach while his father coached swimming. As a result, he grew up practicing a wide variety of sports, such as swimming, taekwondo, and gymnastics, eventually discovering American football at the age of six after watching a cousin play. Mayén started out in the Pumas CU youth setup in Mexico City before moving with his family to Querétaro, where he played for the Cimarrones and Gatos Querétaro, both in the FADEMAC. He grew up idolizing Ezekiel Elliott.

Before entering preparatoria, Mayén spent one year in California. He attended Aliso Niguel High School in Aliso Viejo, where he played on the junior varsity football team and ran sprints on the track and field team. Mayén then returned to Mexico when his father lost his job. He later told ESPN Deportes that the experience taught him that he could compete at a high level.

== College career ==
Mayén attended the Monterrey Institute of Technology and Higher Education (ITESM), Puebla campus, where he studied business and played college football for the Borregos Puebla. He and his brother had initially planned to attend the flagship campus in Monterrey to play for the Borregos Salvajes Monterrey, but they changed their minds upon the hiring of head coach Eric Fisher at Puebla. As a freshman in 2022, Mayén helped the team reach the ONEFA semifinals after rushing for 651 yards and eight touchdowns in the regular season, and was named the ONEFA Rookie of the Year. He was also selected to represent Team Mexico in the 47th Aztec Bowl against Air Raid Tour, an NCAA Division II and III all-star team coached by Hal Mumme.

In 2023, Mayén rushed for 971 yards and 14 touchdowns in the regular season, led the country in scoring, and became the first player in program history to win the ONEFA Most Valuable Player award. He helped the Borregos Puebla reach the ONEFA semifinals again in 2024, where he had one of his best games of the season in a defeat to the Auténticos Tigres UANL. In 2025, Mayén rushed for 1,013 yards (Note: Other sources credited him with 1,079 yards.) and 12 touchdowns in the regular season, leading the nation in both categories. He guided his team back to the semifinals, where he rushed for nearly 200 yards and two touchdowns in a loss to the Borregos Salvajes Monterrey, and once again earned an invite to the Aztec Bowl.

Mayén attempted to join the NFL International Player Pathway program in 2025, going through a tryout at the NFL Academy in Mexico City, but he was ultimately not selected to the program. Shortly thereafter, he announced that he was exploring his options, which included playing professionally in the United States, Canada, or Europe, and even flag football. In January 2026, Mayén announced that he would be transferring to the flagship ITESM campus to play for the Borregos Salvajes Monterrey. He later published a video on social media claiming that he had been offered a spot on the Eastern Michigan Eagles before he was informed by the National Collegiate Athletic Association (NCAA) of his ineligibility.

== National team career ==
Mayén was called up to the Mexico senior national team ahead of a matchup against Canada at the Estadio Wilfrido Massieu in Mexico City on 13 December 2025. The game was a provisional Gridiron Nations Championship (GNC) exhibition which would be used to assess Mexico's readiness for GNC membership for 2026. Mayén rushed for 35 yards and one touchdown and caught one pass for 18 yards in a 41–34 overtime victory, marking Mexico's first international match in 10 years and their first-ever win over Canada.

== Personal life ==
Mayén has amassed a significant following on social media, surpassing a million followers on TikTok by his freshman year of college. Several of his videos went viral, including choreographed dances with teammates, after which he began landing sponsorship deals. One particular video posted in 2022, which featured Mayén and several teammates dancing to a remixed version of the song "Lights by Ellie Goulding as part of a TikTok trend, garnered over 20 million views on the platform in under three weeks.

Mayén covered Super Bowl LIX in New Orleans in a collaboration with TV Azteca after receiving offers from multiple outlets.

His older brother, Eduardo, played college football for the Borregos Puebla and the Linces UVM.
