= Borregos Salvajes Toluca football =

American football team in Mexico

- First season: 1995
- Last season: 2021
- Head coach: Gustavo Tella; 2nd season, 4–6 (.400)
- Stadium: Estadio La Congeladora (capacity: 5,000)
- Location: Toluca, State of Mexico
- League: ONEFA
- Conference: Conferencia Jacinto Licea
- All-time record: 135–109 (.553)

Claimed national championships
- 1 (2017)

Conference championships
- 3 (Premier: 2; Nacional: 1)
- Rivalries: ITESM Monterrey; ITESM CEM
- Colors: Blue and White
- Outfitter: Under Armour

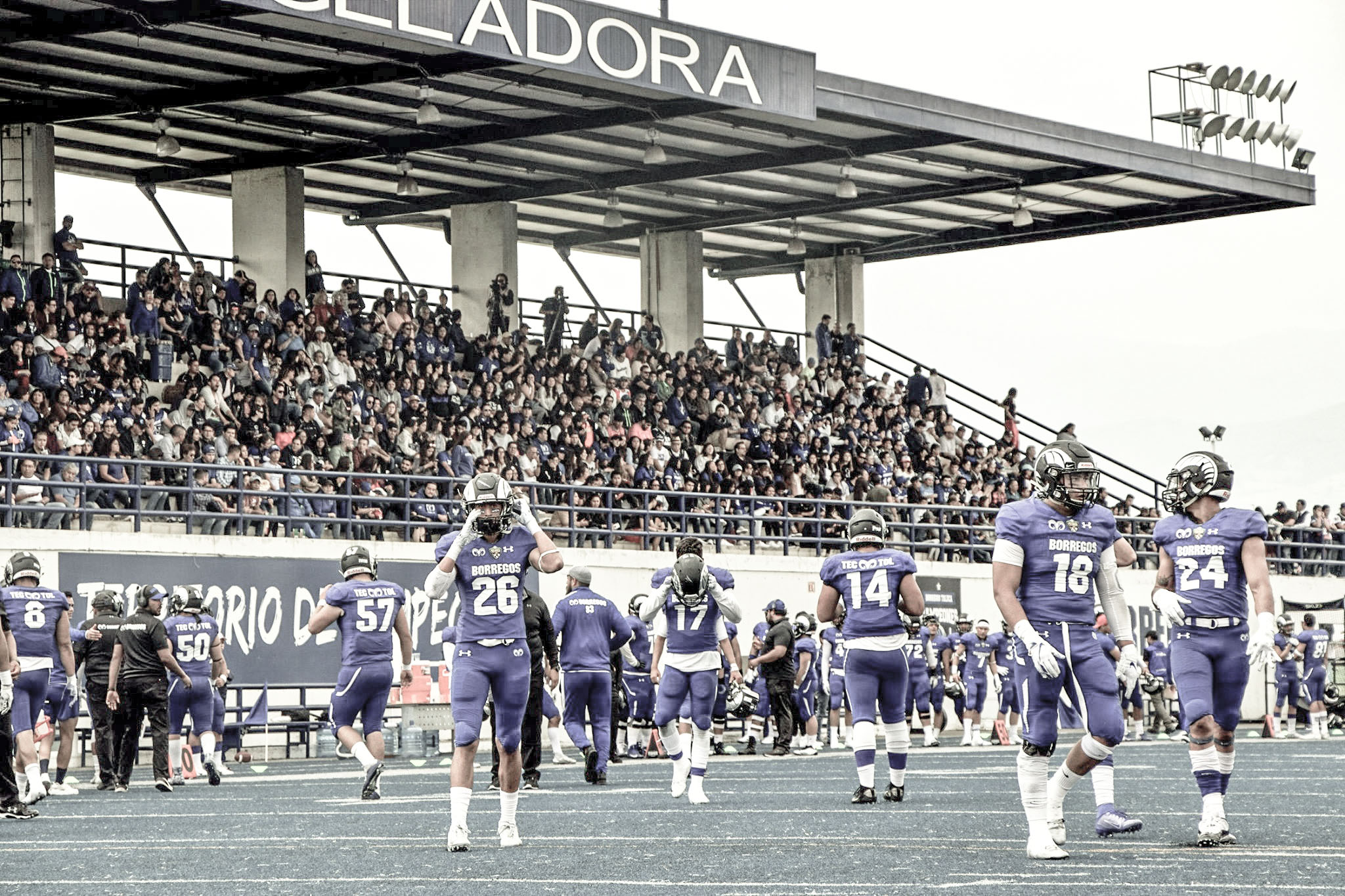
Borregos Toluca during a game in La Congeladora stadium.

The Borregos Salvajes Toluca (English: Toluca Wild Rams), or simply Borregos Toluca, team represented the Toluca campus of the Monterrey Institute of Technology and Higher Education (ITESM) in college football from 1995 to 2021. The Borregos Toluca last competed in the Jacinto Licea Conference, ONEFA's top division.

Borregos Toluca has won one National Championships in 2017 and two Conferencia Premier titles (2017 and 2018).

The team played in the Estadio La Congeladora, the only college stadium in Mexico with blue turf.

== History ==
=== Early years ===
American football at the ITESM Toluca started with the youth program in 1990. In 1995, the school created the Liga Mayor program and participated in the Conferencia Nacional for the first time under head coach Santiago Caballero, finishing with a 1–7 record. The next season the team improved to a 3–5 record. In 1997, now led by coach Rafael Garnica, Borregos Toluca finished 7–1 and won the Conferencia Nacional title after defeating the Guerreros Aztecas UNAM 35–22 in the championship game. By winning the Conferencia Nacional, Borregos Toluca was promoted to the Conferencia de los 10 Grandes, the top level of college football in Mexico at the time.

=== Diego García Miravete era (2000–2005) ===
In 2000, Diego García Miravete, who won nine National Championships with Cóndores UNAM as head coach, was appointed as Borregos Toluca new head coach. Led by García Miravete the team became one of the top teams of the league, but failed to win any championship, always reaching semifinals from 2001 to 2005, but unable to qualify to the championship game. Miravete left the team in 2006 and was replaced by Adolfo Jamal.

=== 2006–2016 ===
For the 2007 season, Borregos Toluca was penalized by ONEFA for using an ineligible player and were barred from the playoffs.

Adolfo Jamal left the team at the end of the 2008 season and was replaced by Juan Carlos Maya. For the 2009 season, all the ITESM teams left the ONEFA and created their own league, the Campeonato Universitario Borregos. In 2010, Borregos Toluca joined as a charter team to the newly created Conferencia Premier CONADEIP.

=== Horacio García era (2012–2018) ===
In 2012 Horacio García was appointed head coach of the team.

In 2014, Borregos Toluca reached a championship game for the first time in its history, but lost against the Aztecas UDLAP 14–17.

2017 was the team's best season. After finishing the regular season 7–2, Borregos Toluca reached the Conferencia Premier championship game and defeated Aztecas UDKAO 31–28, winning the Conferencia Premier title. Later, in the National Championship, Borregos Toluca defeated the ONEFA champions Pumas CU 16–15, being crowned National Champions for the first time.

In 2018, Toluca repeated as champions of the Conferencia Premier, defeating rivals Borregos Salvajes Monterrey 28–21 in Monterrey. Since ONEFA and CONADEIP did not reach an agreement for the season, no National Championship was played.

In 2019, after eight seasons with the team, Horacio García left ITESM Toluca to coach Pumas Acatlán.

=== Gustavo Tella era (2019–2021) ===
In June 2019, ITESM Toluca appointed former offensive coordinator Gustavo Tella as the team's new head coach. Tella previously played in Borregos Toluca as wide receiver and placekicker during his college career and played professionally from 2005 to 2007 for the Rhein Fire and Berlin Thunder of the NFL Europa.

=== Disappearance ===
On 2 February 2022, authorities of ITESM Campus Toluca announced that the school's American football program for Liga Mayor would be disbanded.

== Championships ==
=== National championships ===
Year	Coach	Record	Opponent	Result
2017	Horacio García	10–2	Pumas UNAM CU	W 16–15

=== Conference championships ===
Year	League/Conference	Coach	Record	Opponent	Result
1997	Conferencia Nacional	Rafael Garnica	10-1	Guerreros Aztecas UNAM	W 35–21
2017	Conferencia Premier	Horacio García	9–2	Aztecas UDLAP	W 31–28
2018	Conferencia Premier	Horacio García	5–4	Borregos Salvajes Monterrey	W 28–21
