= Águilas Blancas IPN football =

Mexican football team

- First season: 1969
- Head coach: Enrique Zárate; 8th season, 25–25 (.500)
- Location: Mexico City, Mexico
- Stadium: Estadio Wilfrido Massieu (capacity: 13,000)
- League: ONEFA
- Conference: Conferencia Jacinto Licea
- Colors: Red and White

National championships
- Claimed: 5 (1973, 1981, 1982, 1988, 1992)
- Rivalries: UNAM; Burros Blancos IPN

Uniforms
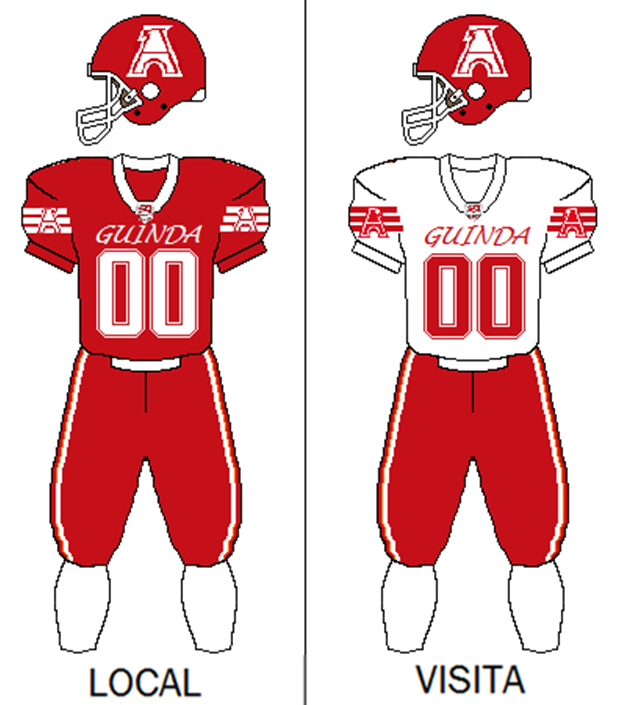
- Website: www.aguilasblancas.org

Águilas Blancas (English: White Eagles), also known as Politécnico when representing the entirety of National Polytechnic Institute, founded as Águilas Blancas de la ESCA-ESIQIE, is a Mexican college football team based in the Casco de Santo Tomas neighborhood of Mexico City, Mexico. Águilas Blancas participate in the Green Conference as part of the National Student Organization of American Football (ONEFA). It is one of the most successful college football teams in Mexico having won five national championships throughout their history. They maintain a fierce rivalry with teams from the National Autonomous University of Mexico particularly with its Coyoacán based team from Ciudad Universitaria, Pumas Dorados de la UNAM.

The team plays in Estadio Wilfrido Massieu, and Enrique Zárate is the head coach since 2014.

== History ==
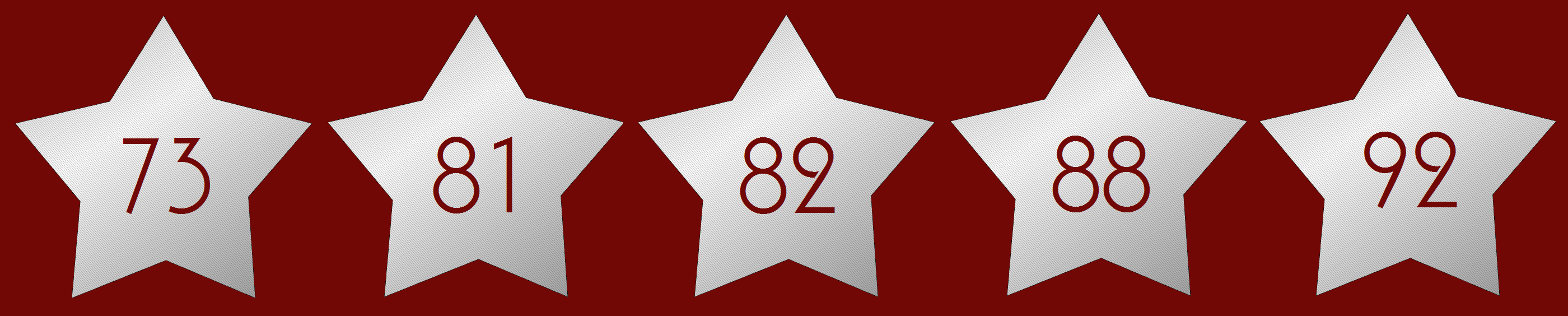
Politécnico National Championships

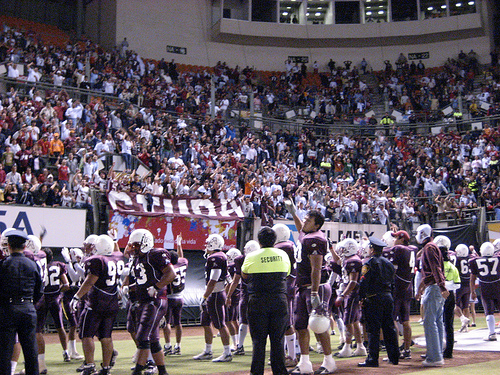
Politécnico players acknowledging fans after a game

This squad is the heir of the Burros Blancos IPN that was one of the oldest institution with an ancient American football tradition in Mexico (the other and their main competitor is the Pumas Dorados de la UNAM), the beginning of this squad can be traced to the late 1940s.

The modern age started in the sixties and the origin of this squad as we know it now was in the late sixties, when the National Polytechnic Institute decided to create three squads to represent its different schools: the Búhos (Owls) representing the ESM (School of Medicine) and the ENCB (Biological Sciences School), the Cheyennes representing the ESIME (School of Mechanical and Electrical Engineering) and the ESIA (School of Engineering and Architecture), and the Águilas Blancas representing the ESCA (School of Commerce and Administration) and the ESIQIE (School of Chemical Engineering).

Águilas Blancas was the best ranked team of the IPN during the first years after the foundation. The first championship came in 1973; later from 1974 to 1980 the squad found a lot of ups and downs; in 1981 came the second championship and in 1982 the third championship.

In 1986, due to the critical economic situation in Mexico, the IPN authorities decided to merge the three teams and then came the foundation of Poli Guinda.

1988 was the year of the fourth championship and this time the relevance was large, because Águilas Blancas (now revived) defeated the Pumas Dorados de la UNAM at the final match.

In 1992 came the fifth and last championship of the team.

From 1998 to 2006; the team did not reach any post season game, the season 2000 was the worst of its history. Today the team is in a renewal process and is one of the mayor candidates to win the championship of the new Green Conference (Conferencia Verde).

After the 2011 season, head coach Jacinto Licea left Águilas Blancas after coaching the team during its entire existence.

=== Enrique Zárate era (2014–present) ===
In 2014 Enrique Zárate, who previously was part of the Borregos CEM coaching staff, assumed as the new head coach of Águilas Blancas. Zárate played his college career with the Águilas Blancas.

In 2019 the Águilas Blancas reached a final again after 26 years, but lost against the Burros Blancos 17–24.

== Championships ==
=== National championships ===
Year	League/Conference	Coach	Record	Opponent	Result
1973	Liga Nacional Colegial	Jacinto Licea	7–0	Águilas Reales UNAM	W 21–19
1981	Conferencia Metropolitana	Jacinto Licea	7–0	N/A	N/A
1982	Conferencia Metropolitana	Jacinto Licea	8–1	Cóndores UNAM	W 16–8
1988	Conferencia Mayor	Jacinto Licea	8–0	Cóndores UNAM	W 38–6
1992	Conferencia Mayor	Jacinto Licea	8–3	Centinelas CGP	W 17–13

== Rivalry ==
The team has an historic rivalry with Pumas Dorados de la UNAM, due to both of them being the biggest public universities in the country. More recently, another mayor rivalry has arisen with Borregos Salvajes Monterrey, Borregos Salvajes CEM, Aztecas UDLAP and recently with the Burros Blancos IPN.

== Venue ==
The team plays at the Estadio Wilfrido Massieu, built in 1959 and renovated in 1994. The stadium has a seating capacity of 15,000. It is located north of Mexico City, within the Unidad Profesional Adolfo Lopez Mateos, IPN's main campus.
