= Héctor Zepeda =

Mexican gridiron football player (born 1997)

Profile
- Position: Offensive lineman

Personal information
- Born: 1 November 1997 (age 29); Ensenada, Baja California, Mexico
- Listed height: 6 ft 4 in (1.93 m)
- Listed weight: 297 lb (135 kg)

Career information
- High school: Instituto México (Tijuana)
- College: ITESM Monterrey
- CFL draft: 2022G: 1st round, 8th overall pick

Career history
- Ottawa Redblacks (2024)*
- * Offseason or practice squad member only

Awards and highlights
- ONEFA champion (2022); CONADEIP champion (2019)
- Stats at CFL.ca

Héctor Andrés Zepeda Hernández (born 1 November 1997) is a Mexican professional football offensive lineman. He played college football at the Monterrey Institute of Technology and Higher Education (ITESM), where he won two national championships with the Borregos Salvajes Monterrey. He was selected to participate in the National Football League (NFL)'s International Player Pathway Program (IPPP) in 2022 and 2023. Zepeda was also drafted by the Ottawa Redblacks in the first round of the 2022 CFL global draft.

== Early life ==
Zepeda was born in Ensenada, Baja California, and moved to Tijuana soon afterward due to his father's job. He played indoor soccer and basketball as a child. He also competed in sport shooting, winning a gold medal in the 13–14-year-old category at the 2011 Olimpiada Nacional (National Olympics). Zepeda began playing American football at the age of 14; his middle school physical education teacher convinced him to join the team, which he coached. He subsequently played football in high school at the Instituto México in Tijuana. He was selected to an OEFA all-star team that defeated Borregos Prepa Tec 28–0 in the third annual Tazón OEFA-CONADEIP in 2014.

== College career ==
Zepeda received a scholarship to play college football with the Borregos Salvajes Monterrey, representing the Monterrey Institute of Technology and Higher Education (ITESM). He played the guard, tackle and center positions. Zepeda helped the Borregos Salvajes win the 2019 Liga Premier CONADEIP championship. After graduating in 2021, he returned to play another season in 2022 and helped the team win the Liga Mayor ONEFA championship.

== Professional career ==
In October 2021, Zepeda attended an NFL International Combine held in Monterrey. His performance earned him an invitation to participate in the National Football League (NFL)'s International Player Pathway Program (IPPP) in 2022 alongside 12 other prospects. Two of his former teammates at ITESM, Isaac Alarcón and Alfredo Gutiérrez, had been signed to NFL teams after participating in the program in 2020 and 2021, respectively. Zepeda spent 10 weeks training in Arizona before participating alongside other IPPP players Arizona State University's Pro Day on 14 March 2022. However, no team signed him. The following month, Zepeda was drafted by the Ottawa Redblacks of the Canadian Football League (CFL) with the eighth overall pick in the 2022 CFL global draft. He chose to return to Mexico to play in the 2022 college season.

In October 2022, Zepeda once again attended an NFL International Combine, this time held in London at Tottenham Hotspur Stadium. He was selected to the International Player Pathway Program for the second year in a row, being named along with 10 other athletes as a member of the 2023 class. Zepeda was selected by the Galgos de Tijuana with the 20th overall pick in the 2024 Liga de Fútbol Americano Profesional (LFA) draft, but did not play with the team.

On 28 February 2024, Zepeda signed with the Ottawa Redblacks. Following training camp, he accepted a position on the team's practice roster. Zepeda was released by Ottawa on 3 November 2024.

== Personal life ==
Zepeda is the first member of his family to have played American football, and his parents did not know much about it when he began. Zepeda used the #79 jersey in college to honor his grandfather, who died at the age of 79. He earned his undergraduate degree in industrial and systems engineering before enrolling in the Master of Finance program at the EGADE Business School in 2021.
