= Estadio Universitario (UANL) =

Football stadium in Monterrey, Mexico

- El Volcán "The Volcano"
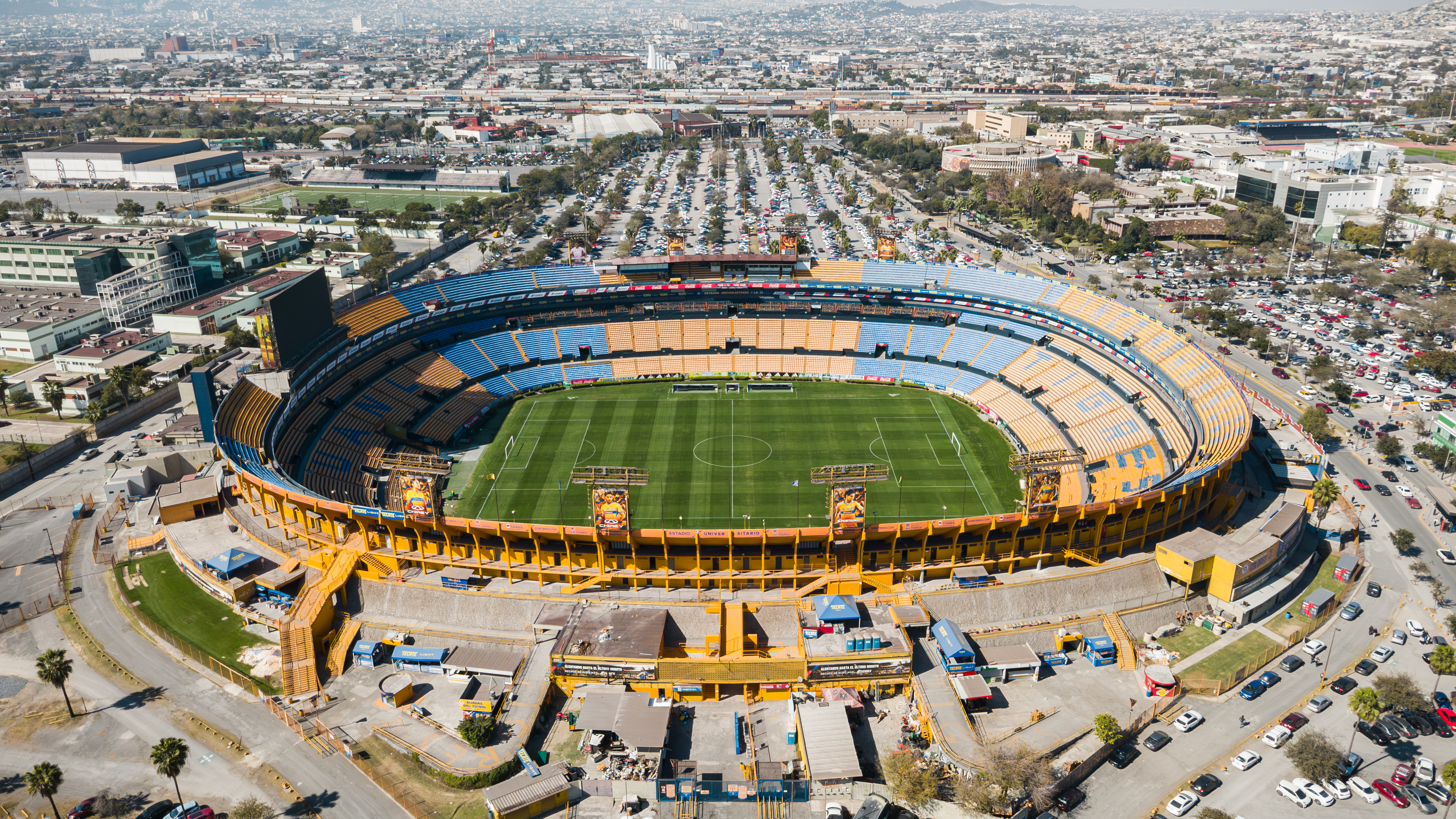
- Interactive map of Estadio Universitario
- Location: San Nicolás de los Garza
- Coordinates: 25.723°N 100.312°W
- Owner: Universidad Autónoma de Nuevo León
- Operator: Cemex
- Capacity: 41,886
- Surface: Grass
- Public transit: Universidad

Construction
- Opened: 30 May 1967
- Cost: 23 million MXN

Tenants
- Tigres UANL (1967–present); American Bowl (1996); Mexico national football team (selected matches)

Estadio Universitario ("University Stadium"), nicknamed El Volcán (Spanish for "The Volcano"), is a football stadium located on the campus of the Universidad Autónoma de Nuevo León (UANL) in San Nicolás de los Garza, Nuevo León, Mexico, a municipality in the Monterrey metropolitan area.

== History ==
=== Construction ===
Construction cost $23 million MXN when the stadium was completed in 1967. The official dedication occurred on 30 May of that year. Originally planned to hold nearly 90,000 spectators, the plan was downscaled to meet financial needs. After the 1986 FIFA World Cup, the stadium's official capacity was 52,000. Later, modifications were made to improve the fan experience and increase safety, resulting in a reduced capacity; the stadium currently seats 41,615.

=== Potential renovations ===
In 2016, a proposal was floated to build a replacement venue for Tigres that would sit atop the Santa Catarina River running through central Monterrey. The proposed stadium would have seated 80,000. The National Water Commission, CONAGUA, rejected the project as potentially affecting the flow of the river (the dry riverbed was developed with parks and parking facilities that were swept away in 2010's Hurricane Alex).

== Sports ==
=== Football ===
The stadium is the home venue for the Tigres UANL, playing in the Liga MX. It was given to Sinergia Deportiva, the for-profit company that administers Tigres, as part of the club's assets.

The stadium hosted several matches of the 1986 FIFA World Cup. It also hosted Copa Libertadores de América matches in 2005 and 2006, when Tigres qualified for the prestigious tournament. For a short period, it was also the home venue for C.F. Monterrey. It also hosted several matches of the 1983 FIFA World Youth Championship and the 2011 FIFA U-17 World Cup.

Between 1973 and 1980, C.F. Monterrey, the other top-flight football club in Monterrey, also used the Estadio Universitario. The club departed to return to the Estadio Tecnológico beginning in September 1980.

=== American football ===
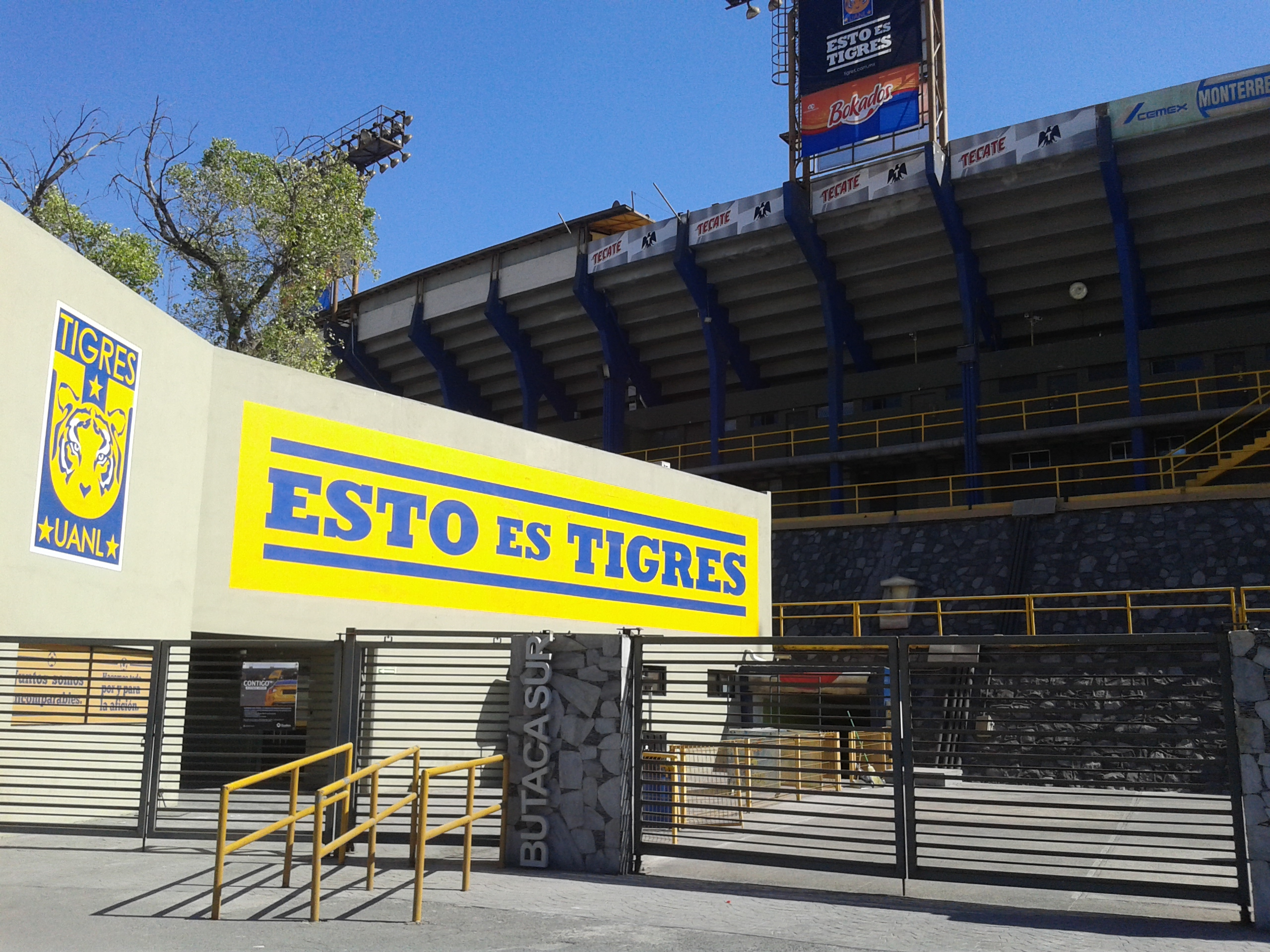
South entrance to the Estadio Universitario

While the Auténticos Tigres, the university's American football team, have their own stadium (the Estadio Gaspar Mass), the Estadio Universitario is normally used for playoff games and ONEFA championships. One exception was the 2016 ONEFA championship game, played at Gaspar Mass due to a playoff football game scheduled for the next day.

On 5 August 1996, the stadium hosted the Kansas City Chiefs and Dallas Cowboys in the American Bowl, with the Chiefs winning by a score of 32–6. The event recorded 52,247 paid tickets.

== Concerts ==
British rock band Queen performed during The Game Tour on October 9, 1981, to more than 150,000 fans on their first and only tour of Mexico.

Artists and bands such as Rod Stewart, Guns N' Roses, The Rolling Stones, Iron Maiden, Johnny Gill, The Cure, Coldplay, Bruno Mars, Shakira, Aerosmith and Metallica have performed at the stadium.

== 1986 FIFA World Cup ==
In the 1986 FIFA World Cup held in Mexico, the stadium hosted 5 matches:

Date	Time	Team #1	Res.	Team #2	Round	Attendance
2 June 1986	16:00	Morocco	0–0	Poland	Group F	19,900
7 June 1986	16:00	Poland	1–0	Portugal	Group F	19,915
11 June 1986	16:00	England	3–0	Poland	Group F	22,700
17 June 1986	16:00	Morocco	0–1	West Germany	Round of 16	19,800
21 June 1986	16:00	West Germany	0–0 (4–1 pen.)	Mexico	Quarter-finals	41,700

== 2022 CONCACAF W Championship ==
The 2022 CONCACAF W Championship held in Mexico, the stadium hosted 8 matches:

Date	Time	Team #1	Res.	Team #2	Round	Attendance
4 July 2022	18:00	United States	3–0	Haiti	Group A	5,345
4 July 2022	21:00	Mexico	0–1	Jamaica	Group A	5,291
8 July 2022	18:00	Trinidad and Tobago	0–4	Costa Rica	Group B	3,025
8 July 2022	21:00	Panama	0–1	Canada	Group B	3,249
11 July 2022	18:00	Panama	1–0	Trinidad and Tobago	Group B	3,969
11 July 2022	21:00	United States	1–0	Mexico	Group A	20,522
14 July 2022	18:00	United States	3–0	Costa Rica	Semi-finals	2,537
14 July 2022	21:00	Canada	3–0	Jamaica	Semi-finals	3,153

== See also ==
- Estadio BBVA
- List of football stadiums in Mexico
