= Estadio La Cueva del León =

Multi-use stadium in Huixquilucan, Mexico

Coordinates: 19°24′1″N 99°15′59″W

The Estadio La Cueva del León is a multi-use stadium located in Huixquilucan, State of Mexico. It is currently used mostly for American football matches and is the home stadium of Leones Anáhuac Norte that plays at the ONEFA.

The stadium has a capacity of 5,000 people.
