= Estadio P. R. Tapia =

Stadium in Chapingo, State of Mexico

Coordinates: 19°29′40.5″N 98°53′26.5″W

The Estadio P.R. Tapia is a multi-use stadium located in Chapingo, State of Mexico. It is currently used mostly for American football matches The stadium has a capacity of 3,500 people.
