= José Roberto Espinosa =

Mexican sports commentator (born 1948)

José Roberto "Pepe" Espinosa (born 1948 in Escuinapa, Sinaloa - 2007) was a Mexican commentator for American football at Fox Sports Latin America.

Pepe Espinosa, as he was better known, had a Chemical Engineering degree at Instituto Politécnico Nacional and was also an American football player for the team of that institution. He started in sports media in Mexican television at Imevision (now TV Azteca) in 1976 working along with José Ramón Fernández where he developed as one of the best NFL commentators Mexico has ever had.

He also participated commenting on NBA (80's-2004), NHL (1997–98 and 1998–99 seasons) and College Football (BCS) games while in TV Azteca, as well as the opening and closing ceremonies for the Olympic Games from Seoul 1988, Barcelona 1992, Atlanta 1996 and Sydney 2000 and Winter Olympics from Nagano 1998 and Salt Lake 2002.

"Pepe" was a great advocate of sport culture. He gave speeches to young people (to whom he referred as his "brothers") to lead them towards a sportmanship culture. Espinosa would advise them about hard training, going to the gyms, nutritious diet, staying at school, and respecting their teachers and trainers. He always alerted them about the problems that emerged from keeping bad company and how some professional players decreased their performances by doing that.

In 2004, Pepe Espinosa left TV Azteca after 28 years to join Fox Sports Latin America, where on January 16, 2007, he received a recognition for his 30 years transmitting the Super Bowl for Hispanic audience.

On July 4, 2007, Espinosa died due to a pneumonia provoked by a lymphatic cancer which he was already some years fighting against.

== Last Games Called ==
NBA: Game 5 2004 NBA Finals (TV Azteca)

NFL: Super Bowl XLI (Fox Sports)

College Football: 2007 BCS National Championship Game (Fox Sports)

Olympic Hockey: 2002 ice hockey Gold Medal Game (TV Azteca)

NHL: 1999 Stanley Cup Playoffs (TV Azteca)
