= Alfredo Gutiérrez (American football) =

Mexican gridiron football player (born 1995)

Profile
- Position: Offensive tackle

Personal information
- Born: December 29, 1995 (age 30); Tijuana, Baja California, Mexico
- Listed height: 6 ft 9 in (2.06 m)
- Listed weight: 332 lb (151 kg)

Career information
- High school: Montgomery (San Diego, California, U.S.)
- College: ITESM (2015–2021)
- NFL draft: 2021: undrafted

Career history
- San Francisco 49ers (2021–2023)*
- * Offseason or practice squad member only

Awards and highlights
- CONADEIP champion (2019)
- Stats at Pro Football Reference

Alfredo Gutiérrez Urías (born December 29, 1995) is a Mexican professional American football offensive tackle. He played college football for the Borregos Salvajes Monterrey and was signed by the San Francisco 49ers as an undrafted free agent in 2021.

== Early life ==
Gutiérrez was born in Tijuana, Mexico, on December 29, 1995. He attended Montgomery High School in San Diego, where he played football his last two years. He attended Grossmont College in El Cajon in early 2015, but when his NCAA eligibility process became stalled, he transferred to the Monterrey Institute of Technology where he played college football on a full scholarship and won the CONADEIP national title in 2019.

== Professional career ==
Gutiérrez was assigned to the San Francisco 49ers roster on May 4, 2021, as a part of the NFL's International Player Pathway Program (IPPP). He was waived by the 49ers on August 31, 2021, when the team announced its final 53-man roster for the 2021 season. He was resigned to the practice squad, due to an IPPP exemption allowing the 49ers to have an extra practice squad member; however, he was ineligible to be activated to the main roster.

On February 2, 2022, Gutiérrez was one of eleven players who signed a reserve/futures contract with the 49ers. He played in his first NFL game on August 20, 2022, during week 2 of the 2022 preseason in a 17–7 victory against the Minnesota Vikings. Head coach Kyle Shanahan awarded Gutiérrez the game ball to celebrate his NFL debut. He was waived on August 30, 2022, and signed to the practice squad the next day. He signed a reserve/future contract on January 31, 2023.

The San Francisco 49ers were able to sign Gutiérrez as an extra practice squad member for a third and final year during the 2023 season. Gutiérrez stated that his goal was to make the final roster for the 2023 season, stating "with these two years of learning, I'm hoping I can land a spot in the 53". He was waived on August 29, 2023 and re-signed to the practice squad the following day. He was not among the players signed to reserve/future contracts in 2024 and thus became a free agent when his practice squad contract expired.

== Personal life ==
On September 26, 2022, one day before an international friendly match between the Mexico and Colombia national teams in Levi's Stadium, Gutiérrez was invited by the Mexico national team to trade jerseys with Mexican players Guillermo Ochoa and Andrés Guardado.
