= Cóndores UNAM football =

- First season: 1970
- Last season: 1997
- Stadium: Estadio Olímpico Universitario (capacity: 69,000)
- Location: Coyoacán, Mexico City
- League: ONEFA
- Conference: Conferencia de los 10 Grandes

Claimed national championships
- 10 (1970, 1978, 1979, 1980, 1983, 1984, 1985, 1986, 1990, 1991)
- Rivalries: IPN; ITESM
- Colors: Black and Gold

The Cóndores UNAM (English: UNAM Condors) was one of the three American football teams that represented the National Autonomous University of Mexico (UNAM) from 1970 to 1997. The Cóndores competed in the ONEFA and won 10 national championships, including four in a row from 1983 to 1986.

== History ==
=== Background ===
American football was first played in the National Autonomous University of Mexico (UNAM) in 1927, when several students that spent some time in American schools and had played the sport returned to Mexico. The team's first name was Osos (Bears) and navy blue and gold were chosen as the colors, inspired by the colors of the Notre Dame Fighting Irish. The team's nickname was later changed to Horda Dorada (Golden Horde) and in 1946 head coach Roberto "Tapatío" Méndez chose the Pumas nickname, which since then has been used for all UNAM's representative sport teams, most notably the professional football team.

From 1933 to 1967, the Pumas won 33 national championships. In 1969 the Liga Nacional Colegial (Collegiate National League) was established as the top college football championship in Mexico. The league wanted to increase the number of teams, so it suggested major institutions such as the UNAM and the Instituto Politécnico Nacional (IPN) to create several teams. UNAM refused and therefore was not allowed to compete in the 1969 season of the Liga Nacional Colegial.

For the 1970 season UNAM agreed to create three teams: Águilas Reales (Royal Eagles), Guerreros Aztecas (Aztec Warriors) and Cóndores. The nicknames were inspired by the UNAM's seal. Pumas still existed, but only as a selection of the best players from UNAM's three teams created for the rivalry game Clásico Poli-Universidad against IPN that was played in the end of the season as a merely symbolic game.

=== First years (1970–1975) ===
Manuel Neri Fernández, who was UNAM's head coach before the split, continued as head coach for the Cóndores and chose gold and black as the team colors because "gold is one of UNAM colors and black because it resembles another of the UNAM colors: navy blue". Cóndores rapidly established itself as UNAM's top team, above Águilas Reales and Guerreros Aztecas. In its inaugural season in 1970, the team won its first national title and completed a perfect season.

Neri Fernández led the Cóndores from 1970 to 1972. In 1973, UNAM decided that Neri Fernández and Alfonso "Desalmado" García, top coaches at UNAM's Intermedia (junior category) teams, would dispute the Cóndores' head coach title: whoever led his junior team to the best result during the Intermedia season, would be Cóndores coach. "Desalmado" García again coached Cóndores in 1974.

In 1975 Neri Fernández retook control of the team but did not have a good season, finishing with a 2–3 record and unable to qualify to the playoffs.

=== Diego García Miravete era (1976–1993) ===
In 1976, UNAM's authorities decided to replace Neri Fernández with a young Diego García Miravete, who previously played with the Condors as defensive end during the early seventies. García Miravete brought a younger coaching staff with him and renovated the Cóndores image.

Under coach García Miravete, Cóndores won nine more national championships, including four consecutive from 1983 to 1986, becoming the first team to do so in the history of the Organización Nacional Estudiantil de Fútbol Americano (ONEFA). In 2007 Borregos Salvajes Monterrey became the second team to achieve the feat.

=== Decline ===
In 1994 Diego García Miravete was replaced by Arturo Alonso, who led the Cóndores for two seasons without winning any titles. In 1996 José Juan Sánchez was appointed as head coach but the team was again unable to win any championship.

In 1998, UNAM authorities decided to merge its three teams to make a competitive team again with the nickname Pumas to compete in the 10 Grandes Conference of the ONEFA, thus, leading to the disappearance of the Cóndores.

== Championships ==
=== National championships ===
| Year | League/Conference | Coach | Record | Opponent | Result |
|---|---|---|---|---|---|
| 1970 | Liga Nacional Colegial | Manuel Neri Fernández | 8–0 | N/A | N/A |
| 1978 | Conferencia Metropolitana | Diego García Miravete | 8–1 | Águilas Blancas IPN | W 23–14 |
| 1979 | Conferencia Metropolitana | Diego García Miravete | 10–0 | Águilas Blancas IPN | W 28–16 |
| 1980 | Conferencia Metropolitana | Diego García Miravete | 10–0 | Águilas Blancas IPN | W 28–26 |
| 1983 | Conferencia Metropolitana | Diego García Miravete | 9–0 | Águilas Blancas IPN | W 23–3 |
| 1984 | Conferencia Metropolitana | Diego García Miravete | 8–0 | Águilas Blancas IPN | W 40–29 |
| 1985 | Conferencia Metropolitana | Diego García Miravete | 8–0 | Pieles Rojas IPN | W 31–0 |
| 1986 | Conferencia Metropolitana | Diego García Miravete | 7–1 | N/A | N/A |
| 1990 | Conferencia Mayor | Diego García Miravete | 8–1 | Águilas Blancas IPN | W 16–3 |
| 1991 | Conferencia Mayor | Diego García Miravete | 11–0 | Borregos Salvajes ITESM | W 41–16 |

== Legacy ==
The team became one of the most popular American football teams in Mexico during its existence. This popularity remains till today. Condors CDMX, a team from the Liga de Fútbol Americano Profesional, took its name and colors as an homage to the Cóndores.
