= Borregos Salvajes =

Representatives of the Monterrey Institute of Technology and Higher Education in Mexico

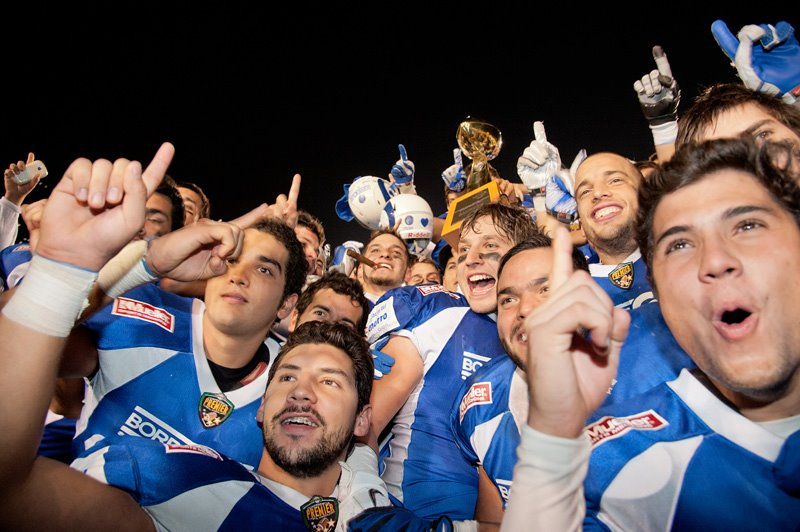
The Borregos Salvajes of Monterrey Tech celebrate their championship in the 2012 season.

The Borregos Salvajes ITESM (in English: Wild Rams) is the name of all the cultural, artistic and sports teams that represent the Monterrey Institute of Technology and Higher Education (ITESM) in various disciplines, such as sports, theatre, music and leadership representatives. The name of is derived from official mascot of the institution: the bighorn ram.

The Tec de Monterrey teams are best known for college football across Mexico. The two most successful Borregos football teams are those from the Monterrey and State of Mexico campuses. These two teams have won the majority of the Mexican college league championships since the early 1990s.

== Monterrey campus ==
In 1945, a group of ITESM students created an American football team to compete against the Autonomous University of Nuevo León's team.

The first "Clásico" (in English: Classic) was played on November 20, 1945, and the Borregos won 12-7. From 1945 to 1947, they competed in a league that included the local teams Tigres and Gatos Negros. However, the rapid growth of this sport in Monterrey allowed for its expansion, and the Second Force league was established in 1946. When the First Force season of 1947–1948 arrived, the Borregos obtained their first victory in a First Force Clásico on November 8, 1947.

The next year, on December 11, 1948, the Borregos won their first championship in the major category. On July 17, 1950, the Estadio Tecnológico (Tecnológico Stadium) was inaugurated. The Borregos won the major league trophy in 1950, 1951, 1953, 1958 and 1959, and were crowned champions of 1962-1964 season. In 1965, the team was disbanded by ITESM, but reassembled the following year.

In 1974, the Borregos Salvajes became the national champions. After the creation of ONEFA, the Borregos became champions in the 1987, 1988 and 1989 seasons of the National Conference. In 1993, they won the national "10 Grandes" (Big 10) conference.

In 1994, the Borregos Salvajes won an ONEFA title. In 1996, the team began a 14-year winning streak. The Borregos Salvajes have played the ONEFA Major League championship game 14 consecutive times, winning 9 titles in the highest level of college football in Mexico. The team won the title 5 consecutive seasons from 2004-2008. As of 2007, the Borregos' games were broadcast on ESPN throughout Mexico and Central America.

== Toluca campus ==
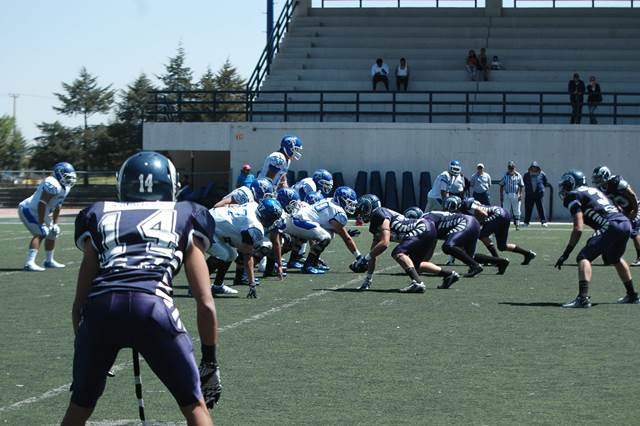
Game between Borregos teams from Campus Ciudad de Mexico and Campus Toluca at Toluca

The Toluca Borregos team began in the major league in 1995, when most of the players were rookies. From 1997 onwards, they have reached the "10 Grandes" conference.

In 2017, the Borregos became CONADEIP National Champions and National Champions in the "Tazón de Campeones" (Champion's Bowl).

In 2018, the Toluca Borregos became National Champions CONADEIP again, beating the Monterrey Borregos team.

== Mexico City campus ==
American football at the Mexico City campus began in 1992. In 1994, the team began recruiting players from outside ITESM.

In 1995, the Mexico City Borregos played their first championship in the free intermediate category, after which a major league team on campus was created.

In 1996, the Borregos won the Youth "AA" CONA league championship. The scholarship program began to support student football players, bringing the team into the major leagues. In 1997, the Borregos Salvajes entered the national conference, ONEFA.

For the 2000 season, the Borregos were the favorites to win the championship, and advanced to the "10 Grandes" conference.

From 2001 to 2004, the Borregos won only three games. However, in 2005 the Youth A team won an uncontested championship and the major leagues Borregos team managed to win three matches; the following year was similarly successful. In 2006, an advisory committee was created in which both the Mexico City campus and the Santa Fe campus would cooperate to strengthen the football program. The team remains in the "10 Grandes" conference.

The male volleyball team won three national championships (1st division) between 2001 and 2004.

== State of Mexico campus ==
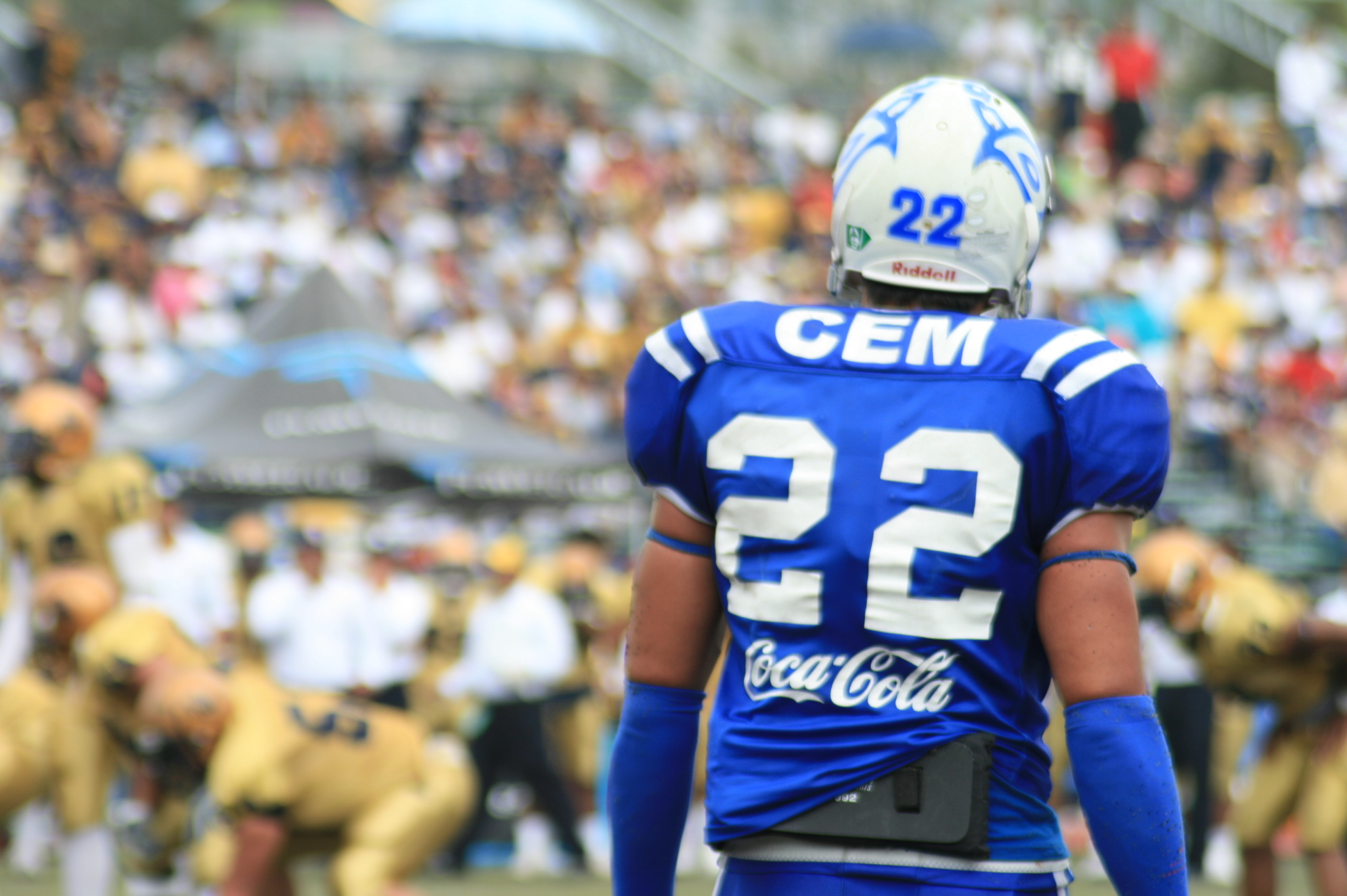
An American football player from the Monterrey Institute of Technology and Higher Education, State of Mexico Campus' Borregos Salvajes overlooks the playing field in a match against the Pumas of the National Autonomous University of Mexico.

Beginning with the foundation of the State of Mexico campus in 1976, sports were regarded as an "essential activity in the comprehensive education of [the] students."

American football was introduced to the campus in 1979, in the intermediate leagues. In 1984, the Borregos had teams in 3 different categories: Youth A, AA and Intermediate. They eventually reached the major leagues in 1994, participating in the ONEFA, and took second place.

In 1996, with a record of an undefeated 11 wins, the Borregos won the national conference championship. In their first appearance in the conference, they took 4th place. In 2000, the Borregos won the "10 Grandes" conference. In the years immediately following this, the team consistently placed in the top 3.

== Other campus ==
Starting in 2010, all of the Borregos Salvajes teams are competing in a new league, the CONADEIP premier league. This league also features three new teams, coming from the Puebla, Santa Fé and Querétaro campuses.
