= Estadio Gaspar Mass =

American football stadium in Monterrey, Nuevo León, Mexico

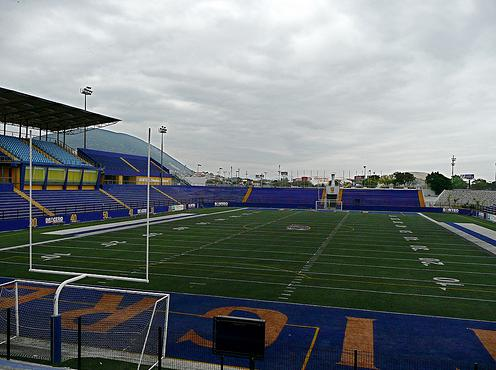
- Interactive map of Estadio Gaspar Mass
- Location: San Nicolás de los Garza, Nuevo León, Mexico
- Coordinates: 25°43′40″N 100°18′48″W
- Owner: Universidad Autónoma de Nuevo León
- Operator: Universidad Autónoma de Nuevo León
- Capacity: 16,000
- Surface: Artificial turf

Construction
- Opened: 24 August 1979

Tenant
- Auténticos Tigres (ONEFA) (1979–present)

Estadio Gaspar Mass is an artificial turf stadium in San Nicolás de los Garza, Mexico, a city in the Monterrey metropolitan area. It is primarily used for American football and is the home field for the Universidad Autónoma de Nuevo León (UANL) Auténticos Tigres. It has a seating capacity of approximately 16,000.

== History ==
The stadium was inaugurated on 24 August 1979 and originally had a capacity of 10,000. It is named in honor of Gaspar Mass Martínez (1916–1999), considered "one of the pioneers of American football in Nuevo León" and coach of several different UANL teams over the years. In 2005, the stadium's capacity was expanded to 16,000 with the addition of seats in the south end zone, a project that cost 11 million pesos. Renovations took place prior to the Universiada Nacional in 2015, an event hosted by the UANL, adding improved lighting and a new artificial turf surface.

It has primarily served as the home venue of the Auténticos Tigres, though larger matches, including playoff games and contests against the Tigres' local rival Borregos Salvajes from the Monterrey Institute of Technology and Higher Education, have traditionally been played at the Estadio Universitario. After a multi-year hiatus due to the split of Mexican college football into two leagues, the city's derby—known as the Clásico Regio—was played again in 2016, but at Gaspar Mass instead of the Estadio Universitario, where it had been held in prior years and attracted attendance figures surpassing 40,000. The stadium also hosted the 2016 ONEFA Championship owing to a schedule conflict with the Tigres UANL football club that prevented the use of the Estadio Universitario.

Games between the various preparatory schools operated by the university are also held at the Estadio Gaspar Mass. In 2016, a brawl broke out between fans from rival prep schools after a game in the stadium, resulting in 20 arrests.
