= Aztecas UDLAP football =

Aztecas UDLAP
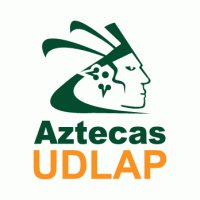
- Head coach: Robert Peay
- Location: San Andrés Cholula, Puebla
- Stadium: Estadio Templo del Dolor (capacity: 4,500)
- League: ONEFA
- Conference: Conferencia Jacinto Licea
- Nickname: Aztecas (Aztecs)
- Colors: Dark Green and Dark Orange
- Website: Official website

Aztecas UDLAP is the name of the sports teams that represent the Universidad de las Américas Puebla (UDLAP), located in San Andrés Cholula, Puebla, Mexico.

== American football ==
=== History ===
In 1947 the team began its life as the American football squad of Mexico City College with the nickname los Aztecas. That same year the squad was admitted into the most important American football conference in Mexico, Liga Mayor. In this conference the team plays against teams with long traditions such as the Pumas Dorados de la UNAM, Águilas Blancas of the National Polytechnic Institute (IPN), Team Education, YMCA and the Military College.

Luis Dias, a brilliant player from UCLA, was named the first coach of the first Aztecas. Next to him, two ex-players from the Rose Bowl were added to the staff: Mary Schinitzer as a linemen coach and Len McVicar as backfield coach. That year they reached great levels of excellence, and that year they were called The Green wave of Mexico City College.

In 1949, the Aztecas recruited great players such as Alex Esquivel from Texas. On October 18, 1949, "the Green Wave" had a match against the leading team, the Pumas Dorados de la UNAM. That game was called "The game of the century". In 1949, The Aztecas won their first championship during the "old" Mexican American Football age.

The team then vanished for years until it re-appeared in 1979. During that year the team was restarted by some players who wanted to have a team for the University of the Americas - Puebla. Coach Leonardo Luján Castañón and Coach Leonardo Corror Ferrer took the lead and guided the team through these difficult times.

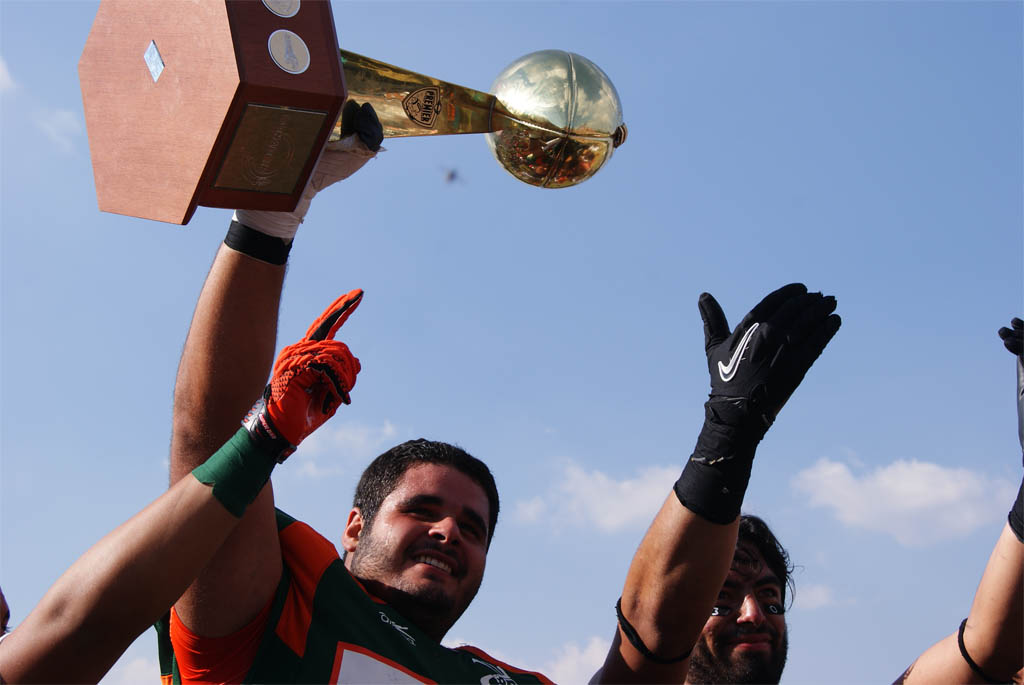
Aztecas UDLAP, 2010 National Champions of the CONADEIP

In 1986 the squad entered the ONEFA, but it was not until 1991 that the championship of the Minor Conference (Conferencia Nacional) was reached and the team was promoted to the Major Category (Conferencia Metropolitana).

From 1994 to 1999, the Aztecas made six consecutive championship appearances including three consecutive titles in 1995, 1996 and 1997. They were led by quarterback Enrique Villanueva. The "tricampeonato" has never been achieved for a second time by any other generation of players and coaches in UDLAP.

The UDLAP squad defeated the UNAM Cóndores in 1995 and the Borregos Salvajes of Tec de Monterrey in 1996 and 1997. However, in the early 2000s the team declined, failing to make the championship game in 2000 and missing the playoffs entirely in 2001.

The team was put in danger of dissolution at the beginning of 2004 due to a decision of the university board of directors, but the university community rallied and the team has now returned to normal play.

In the mid-2000s, the team returned to form, making the final in 2006.

In 2010, the Aztecas jumped from the ONEFA to the new CONADEIP Premier League, which primarily includes teams from private institutions. In their first season, Aztecas UDLAP were crowned the champions after 13 years without winning a national championship, defeating the Borregos Salvajes 17–10 in the championship. They beat Tec de Monterrey again in 2013 and ITESM Campus Toluca in 2014.

In 2016, the Aztecas earned their first undisputed title in 19 years, winning the CONADEIP and beating back Tec de Monterrey 43–40. In a first of its kind "champions bowl", the Aztecas then played the ONEFA champion Auténticos Tigres UANL and defeated them 34–27. They also played the San Diego Toreros at Torero Stadium in a special exhibition game, losing 49–25.

=== National championships ===
The Aztecas have won eight national championships in their history. The first one was in 1949, in the antecedent of the UDLAP, the Mexico City College. After the name and location change, the Aztecas took a lot of time to win another championship. It wasn't until 1995 that the Aztecas won the ONEFA national championship, a feat that they were able to repeat in the next two years (1996 and 1997). In the next years, they reached the final several times. However, they were always defeated in various legendary matches against their most known rivals, the Borregos Salvajes. It took 13 years for the university to win another title and an additional six years to claim an undisputed national title.

Aztecas Football National Championships
| Year | Head coach |
| 1949 | Dave Engman |
| 1995 | Leonardo Luján Castañón |
| 1996 | Leonardo Luján Castañón |
| 1997 | Leonardo Luján Castañón |
| 2010 | Eric Fisher |
| 2013 | Eric Fisher |
| 2014 | Eric Fisher |
| 2016 | Eric Fisher |

== Basketball ==
One of the most classical teams is the basketball team, which was already popular before the football team was installed. They had won several national championships. Their local games are played in the gymnasium "Morris 'Moe' Williams". The most known rivalry is against the Águilas de la UPAEP, another private school in Puebla city.

== Other sports ==
The UDLAP has a reputation of being a top university in the college sports competitions. Many of their teams have won national championships. This is partly due to being one of the few universities in Mexico that are able to grant scholarships to outstanding students. The university has placed several times in second place in the CONADEIP ranking of private universities in Mexico.

Current school teams with participation in national tournaments include:

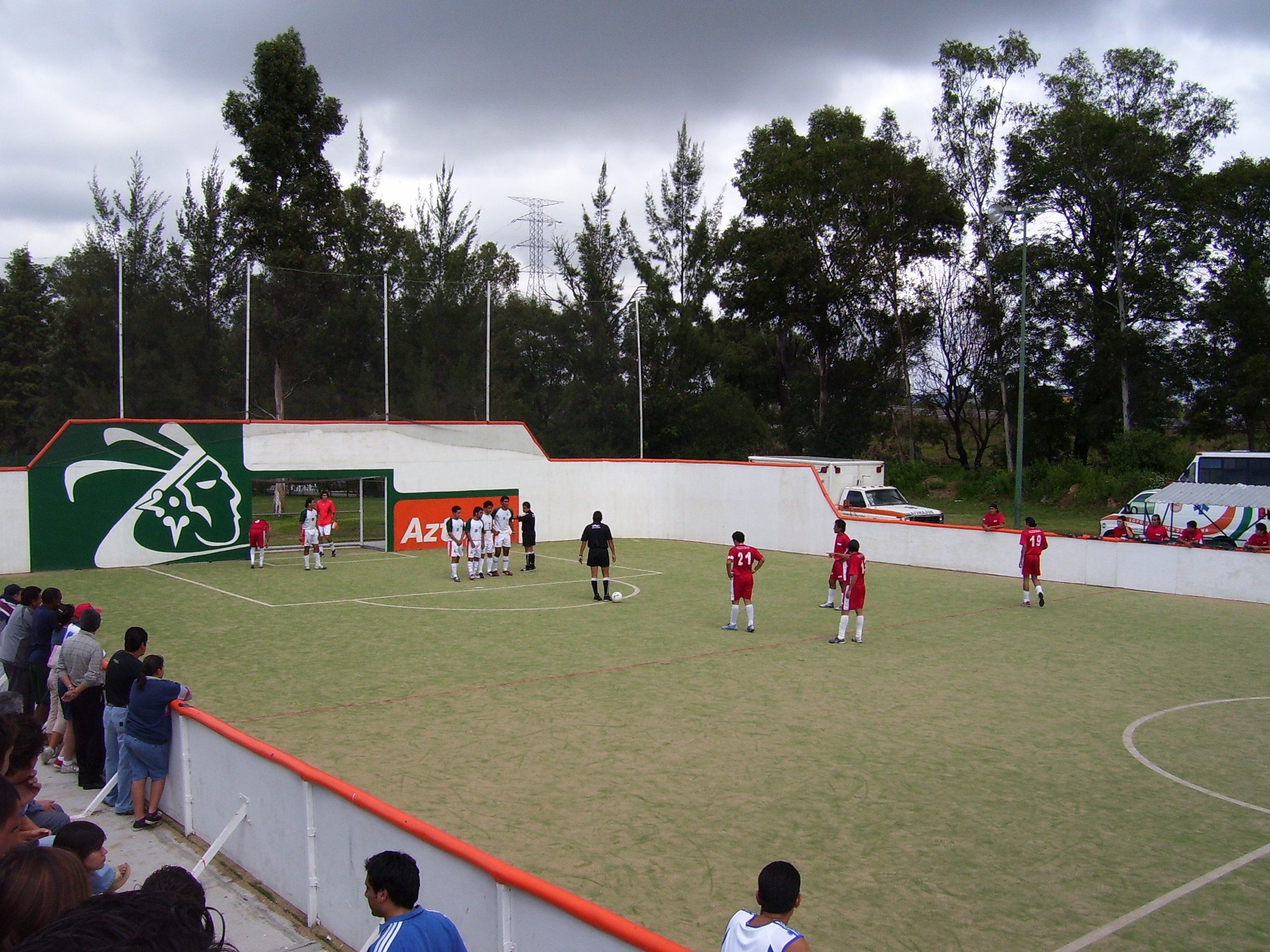
Indoor football at UDLAP

- American football
- Basketball
- Football
- Indoor football
- Rugby union
- Tennis
- Swimming
- Volleyball
- Baseball
- Softball
- Track and field
- Tae Kwon Do
