= Auténticos Tigres UANL football =

- First season: 1944
- Head coach: Antonio Zamora; 6th season, 31–8 (.795)
- Stadium: Estadio Gaspar Mass (capacity: 16,000)
- Location: San Nicolás de los Garza, Nuevo León
- League: ONEFA
- Conference: Conferencia Jacinto Licea

Claimed national championships
- 2 (1974, 1977)

Conference championships
- 6 (Centro: 6)
- Rivalries: ITESM; UNAM; UDLAP; IPN

Current uniform
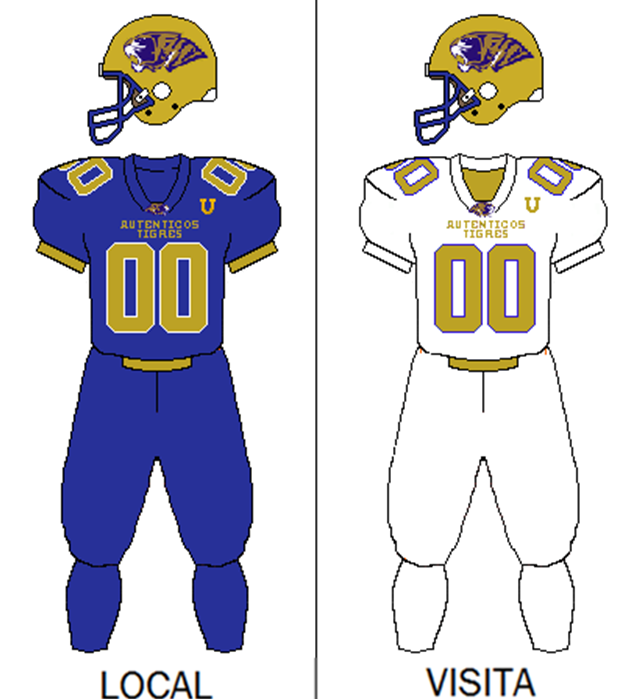
- Colors: Blue and Gold

The Auténticos Tigres UANL (English: UANL Authentic Tigers) team represents the Autonomous University of Nuevo León (UANL) in college football. The Auténticos Tigres compete in the Jacinto Licea Conference, ONEFA's top division.

UANL has won two National Championships: in 1974 and 1977, and six ONEFA championships (2009, 2011, 2012, 2015, 2016 and 2018).

The team plays in the Estadio Gaspar Mass, although occasionally also in the larger Estadio Universitario. Since 2016 Antonio Zamora is the UANL's head coach.

== History ==
=== Origins ===
UANL played its first American football game on 14 November 1944 against the Gatos Negros team from Monterrey, but the team was created and had been training since the last months of 1943 under coach Bernardo Dávila. During these first years the team nickname was Cachorros (Cubs). In 1947, however, Tony Corona, a sports writer from El Norte, wrote in an article that UANL "have played with great courage, so they are no longer Cubs, but Tigers, eager to win"; thus the team's nickname changed from Cachorros to Tigres.

In 1969, the Tigres joined the newly established Liga Nacional Colegial (National College League), alongside squads from the Instituto Politécnico Nacional, Toros Salvajes Chapingo and their rivals Borregos Salvajes.

=== First championships (1970s) ===
In the seventies, with the creation of the Tigres UANL football club, head coach Cayetano Garza then added the Auténticos to the team's nickname to differentiate his varsity team from the professional football club, stating that the American football team were the true representatives of UANL, because they were all students, unlike the football side. Then the team became known as Auténticos Tigres

The 1974 Liga Nacional Colegial season was played as a round-robin tournament and the UANL team had won all its matches. In the last game, Auténticos Tigres faced rivals Borregos Salvajes ITESM in a crowded Estadio Universitario. Borregos Salvajes had only lost one game during the season, so the championship would be decided in this match. UANL lost 10–48, so both teams ended with an 8–1 record and shared the championship.

In 1977 Auténticos Tigres became undefeated champions of the Liga Nacional Colegial with a 7–0 record and after defeating the IPN's Águilas Blancas 66–0 in the final played in the Estadio Universitario.

In 1978 ONEFA took control of college football in Mexico. 1979 is the last year that Auténticos Tigres took part in any ONEFA competition; the team would come back in the nineties.

=== Exile (1980–1990) ===
During the eighties, Auténticos Tigres occasionally played against local and American teams, both in Nuevo León and the United States, mainly in the Southwest.

=== Return to the ONEFA (1990–2008) ===
Auténticos Tigres came back to the ONEFA for the 1991 season, ending the tournament with a 7–2 record. During the 1990s and early 2000s, the team struggled to achieve good results and did not win any championship, under two head coaches: Diego García Miravete, who left the team in 1999 and Edmundo Reyes who led the Auténticos Tigres from 2000 to 2005. Pedro Morales was appointed head coach in 2006.

=== Success in the ONEFA (2009–present) ===
In 2009 Auténticos Tigres won their third championship in the Conferencia del Centro, after defeating Pumas CU. After that, UANL won four more titles under Pedro Morales in 2011, 2012 and 2015. In 2016 Antonio Zamora, who previously played for the UANL as quarterback, replaced Morales as head coach. Zamora led the team to the ONEFA championship in 2016 and again in 2018.

Despite becoming a powerhouse in recent years, Auténticos Tigres failed to qualify for the 2019 playoffs after finishing the season with a 3–4 record.

== Championships ==
=== National championships ===
Year	League	Coach	Record	Opponent	Result
1974	Liga Nacional Colegial	Cayetano Garza	8–1	N/A	N/A
1977	Liga Nacional Colegial	Cayetano Garza	8–0	Águilas Blancas IPN	W 66–0

=== Conference championships ===
Year	Conference	Coach	Record	Opponent	Result
2009	Conferencia del Centro	Pedro Morales	11–0	Pumas UNAM	W 42–21
2011	Conferencia del Centro	Pedro Morales	10–0	Pumas UNAM	W 16–15
2012	Conferencia del Centro	Pedro Morales	10–0	Pumas UNAM	W 34–20
2015	Conferencia del Centro	Pedro Morales	10–0	Pumas UNAM	W 16–7
2016	Conferencia del Centro	Antonio Zamora	11–1	Pumas UNAM	W 20–16
2018	Conferencia del Centro	Antonio Zamora	9–1	Burros Blancos IPN	W 23–20
