= Borregos Salvajes Monterrey football =

American football team in Mexico

2024 Borregos Salvajes Monterrey football team
- First season: 1945
- Head coach: Carlos Altamirano; 4th season, 22–8 (.733)
- Stadium: Estadio Banorte (capacity: 10,057)
- Location: Monterrey, Nuevo León
- League: ONEFA
- Conference: Conferencia Jacinto Licea

Claimed national championships
- 18 (1971, 1972, 1974, 1976, 1993, 1994, 1998, 1999, 2001, 2002, 2004, 2005, 2006, 2007, 2008, 2022, 2023, 2024)

Conference championships
- 23 (LNC: 4; Nacional: 3; Mayor: 2; 10 Grandes: 5; 12 Grandes: 5; Premier: 4)
- Rivalries: UANL; ITESM CEM; UDLAP

Current uniform
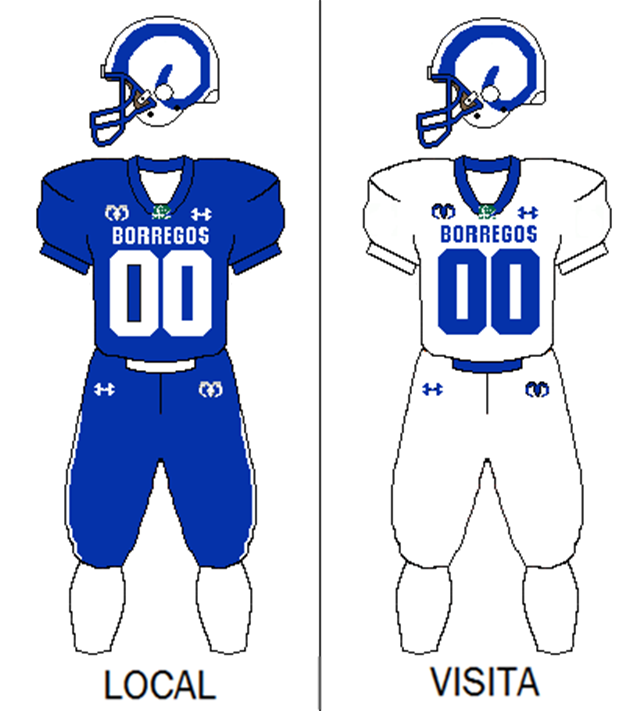
- Colors: Blue and White
- Outfitter: Under Armour

The Borregos Salvajes Monterrey (English: Monterrey Wild Rams) football team represents the Monterrey Institute of Technology and Higher Education (variously Tec de Monterrey or ITESM) in the sport of American football. The Borregos Salvajes are one of the most successful programs in Mexico, having won 15 national titles, including five consecutive from 2004 to 2008, being the only team to achieve such a feat.

From 2020, the team competes in the Conferencia Jacinto Licea of the ONEFA.

Randal C. Archibold of The New York Times called the program the "Alabama Crimson Tide of Mexico".

== History ==
American football was the first sport which was practiced at ITESM.

The tradition of practicing this sport at the ITESM began in 1945 when the institution assigned to Alexander Solis Carranco, who was an American football player and trainer, the task of creating and training an American football squad. The training began with a game explanation and a physical training program which consisted of basic exercises such as calisthenics, run practice, passes, and scrimmages. The team in that time was formed by 14 players during the time of the one-platoon system. Despite the initial pessimism by the robust stranger and of the nature of the sport, the players were excited by the game and after 5 on 5 training sessions the first game was proposed against the Universidad Autónoma de Nuevo León (UANL), the state-run school. This match was the beginning of the classic rivalry game between the two programs, which has become one of the most storied rivalries in the country.

=== Uniform ===
For their first match it was necessary to uniform the players, their jerseys were originally supposed to be made in red with white covers. However, the supplier did not have enough red fabric to make those uniforms. Coach Solis had to choose another color of which the supplier had enough fabric. He chose the blue one because it was the color of the bus in which the team was traveling. Since then, the uniform was a blue jersey with a letter "T" in front, and in the back was the player's number. After that the institute chose blue and white as their official colors.

The selection of the mascot was equally accidental. On the way to the park Cuauhtémoc and Famosa, where the first Classic Match (local derby) would take place, the players had the restlessness to have a mascot to identify them. They passed by a ford, today Santa Catarina River, and saw a man feeding a ram. They bought it for 25 pesos and thus the mascot arose from the equipment that represents the institute.

=== First Championships ===
In 1970, the coach Gustavo Zavaleta re-baptized the team with the nickname "Borregos Salvajes" (Wild Rams) in order to identify it with this species, which is characterized by its constant fight to survive in highly risky situations, always dominating from the heights the atmosphere that surrounds it and showing its superiority before the others. From its birth to 1969 the consolidation of the sport in the institute is considered and in 1948 the Borregos Salvajes received their first trophy. The key time of the American football in the ITESM was the 1960s, since in that decade began the selection of players to enter to the team and started some type of military era, in which the teams survived showing their physical strength and strict discipline.

The Borregos Salvajes were crowned champions of the Liga Nacional Colegial on four occasions: 1971, 1972, 1974 and 1976. In 1977, the Borregos left the Metropolitan Conference. But 12 years later, ITESM returned to the league this time commanded by the head coach Frank González, after obtaining three championships in a row in the National Conference of ONEFA. In this return, they had a record of 4–4. In 1990, the Borregos Salvajes reached the playoffs but lost to the Águilas Blancas. The following year they earned a record of 7–2, reaching semifinals and being left runner-up behind Cóndores.

=== The Return ===
In 1992 the squad improved their record (8–1) and although they had a bad performance when losing to the Águilas Blancas, won the privilege of being considered the best team in Mexico. In 1993, after a delay, the Borregos hosted a Final game of the ONEFA. The Borregos Salvajes beat the Águilas Blancas with a score of 20–13, closing with this one the celebrations of the 50th Anniversary of ITESM.

In 1994, before the expectation of and a doubt of others, one stays in the top and it obtained the second championship, this time against the Aztecas UDLAP playing as a visitor and winning by a score of 17–10. In 1995 it reached the semifinals but it lost to the Aztecas. In 1996 at the Estadio Tecnológico de Monterrey crowded at its maximum capacity, the Borregos again reached the final game with the Aztecs UDLAP. The squad stayed as runner-up after falling with a score of 6–3, after finishing the regular season without a defeat. In 1997 the team was again runner-up. In 1998 it earned the championship, defeating the Aztecs of the UDLAP by a score of 20–17 at the Estadio Tecnológico de Monterrey crowded with 33,155 fans, in a game at noon on Saturday.

In 1999, the Borregos Salvajes obtained a second championship when defeating again the Aztecs of the UDLA by score of 38–25, this time the game was celebrated on the field nicknamed the Temple of the Pain in Cholula, Puebla. In the 2000, the squad arrived at the final game but this time in front of its brothers of the Campus Estado de Mexico, and fell by a score of 38–28, in a game that was celebrated at the "Plastic Corral" Stadium in the State of Mexico.

=== Recent achievements ===
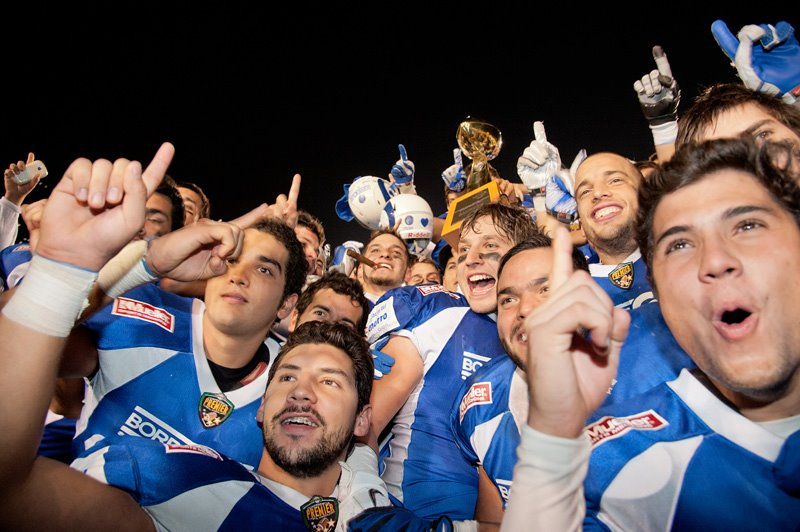
Borregos Salvajes after winning the 2012 Conferencia Premier championship.

In the 2001 season, the team, coached by the Frank González, went to the Championship without a loss. In the Classic, played at the Estadio Tecnológico de Monterrey, against the Auténticos Tigres UANL they beat by a score of 20–12. In the 2002 season, the Borregos Salvajes again advanced to the final game under the direction of González. They faced the Tigres of the UANL in another Final-Classic, in which first half was played even since they finished tied 7–7. Nevertheless, in the third and fourth quarters, the Rams scored touchdowns to win another championship, as the team took 22 games without a defeat and 12 years without a loss to the Tigres.

Monterrey won seasons 2004 (defeating Estado de México), 2005 (defeating Tigres UANL) and 2006 (Defeating the Aztecas UDLAP).

The 2006 season handed another of the Borregos Salvajes campus Monterrey "B" teams a win in the national Division II championship.

In the 2010 season, the Borregos Salvajes played in another conference, the CONADEIP premier league. They reached the finals, where they lost to their rivals, the Aztecas UDLAP 17–10.

== Championships ==
=== National championships ===
Year	League/Conference	Coach	Record	Opponent	Result
1971	Liga Nacional Colegial	Gustavo Zavaleta	9–1	Pieles Rojas Acción Deportiva	W 35–20
1972	Liga Nacional Colegial	Gustavo Zavaleta	7–1	Cóndores UNAM	W 28–9
1974	Liga Nacional Colegial	Julio Ayala	8–1	N/A	N/A
1976	Liga Nacional Colegial	Barry Copenhaver	6–0	Pieles Rojas Acción Deportiva	W 28–22
1993	Conferencia Mayor	Frank González	10–1	Águilas Blancas IPN	W 20–13
1994	Conferencia Mayor	Frank González	9–2	Aztecas UDLAP	W 17–10
1998	10 Grandes	Frank González	11–0	Aztecas UDLAP	W 20–17
1999	10 Grandes	Frank González	10–1	Aztecas UDLAP	W 38–25
2001	10 Grandes	Frank González	11–0	Auténticos Tigres UANL	W 20–12
2002	10 Grandes	Frank González	11–0	Auténticos Tigres UANL	W 34–7
2004	10 Grandes	Frank González	9–2	Borregos Salvajes CEM	W 45–22
2005	12 Grandes	Frank González	11–0	Auténticos Tigres UANL	W 14–10
2006	12 Grandes	Frank González	10–1	Aztecas UDLAP	W 43–34
2007	12 Grandes	Frank González	11–0	Borregos Salvajes CEM	W 36–14
2008	12 Grandes	Frank González	12–0	Auténticos Tigres UANL	W 41–28
2022	14 Grandes	Carlos Altamirano	12–0	Auténticos Tigres UANL	W 32–30
2023	14 Grandes	Carlos Altamirano	10–1	Auténticos Tigres UANL	W 31–27
2024	14 Grandes	Carlos Altamirano	12–0	Auténticos Tigres UANL	W 24–21^{OT}

=== Conference championships ===
Year	League/Conference	Coach	Record	Opponent	Result
2009	Campeonato Universitario Borregos	Frank González	7–0	Borregos Salvajes CEM	W 42–23
2011	Conferencia Premier	Frank González	11–1	Borregos Salvajes CEM	W 34–3
2012	Conferencia Premier	Frank González	11–2	Borregos Salvajes CEM	W 17–6
2015	Conferencia Premier	Leopoldo Treviño	9–2	Aztecas UDLAP	W 33–23
2019	Conferencia Premier	Carlos Altamirano	10–1	Aztecas UDLAP	W 27–13

== Head coaches ==
ITESM Monterrey head coaches from 1945 to present.

No.	Coach	Years	Record
1	Alejandro Solís Carranco	1945	
2	Leroy Willeford & Raúl Álvarez	1946	
3	Leroy Willeford & Manuel Soberanes	1947	
4	Leroy Willeford	1948	
5	Rodolfo Muller López	1949–1950	
6	Salvador "Tarzán" Saldaña	1951	
7, 9, 11	José Alfonso "Cunano" Valdez	1952–1955, 1957, 1962–1964, 1966–1968	
8	Óscar de la Mara	1956	
10	Salvador "Sapo" Mendiola	1958–1961	
12	Rafael Lemus	1969	0–9
13	Gustavo Zavaleta	1970–1972	16–10
14	Brooks Conover	1973	4–2
15	Julio Ayala	1974	8–1
16	Barry Copenhaver	1975–1985	
17	Frank González	1985–2012	247–40
18	César Martínez	2013–2014	15–7
19	Leopoldo Treviño	2015–2016	16–7
20	Carlos Altamirano	2017–present	22–8

== Players in the NFL ==
As of the 2023 NFL season, the following players have become active players in an NFL team.

- Rolando Cantú, G, Arizona Cardinals (2004–2006)
- Isaac Alarcón, DT, Dallas Cowboys (2020–2022)
- Alfredo Gutiérrez, OT, San Francisco 49ers (2021–present)

== Controversy ==
The ITESM and the other Monterrey Institute teams have been accused several times of recruiting the star-players from other universities by giving them need-based private scholarships. Monterrey Institute is one of the most expensive universities in Mexico and almost instantly receives a "yes" response by the public university students who can't afford that type of education. This long-lasting fight between public schools and the ITESM ended with the league being divided in two parts: one which is almost exclusively ITESM teams and the other comprising public schools and mid-class schools.
