= Organización Nacional Estudiantil de Fútbol Americano =

Mexican college football league

National Student Organization of American Football
- Current season, competition or edition: 2026 ONEFA season
- Sport: American football
- Founded: 1978
- First season: 1978
- No. of teams: 33 (Major League)
- Country: Mexico
- Continent: North America
- Most recent champion: Universidad Autónoma de Nuevo León - University City (7th title)
- Broadcasters: 52MX; AYM Sports; Canal Once; Canal Catorce; Claro; Máximo Avance; Multimedios; TV Azteca; TVC Deportes
- Related competitions: Aztec Bowl
- Website: onefaoficial.org

The National Student Organization of American Football (Spanish: Organización Nacional Estudiantil de Fútbol Americano or ONEFA) is the major college football league in Mexico.

American football has been played in Mexico since the early 1920s in different colleges and universities, mainly in Mexico City. In 1928 the first professional championship was played, organized by Jorge Braniff. From the 1920s to the 1970s more universities and colleges joined the championship, and four categories, called fuerzas were created. The First Fuerza became the National League in 1970, and in 1978 it was reorganized under the name ONEFA.

In 2010 a breakaway league, CONADEIP, was formed by the Monterrey Institute of Technology and Higher Education system, UDLAP and additional private universities. In 2017, the leagues started staging regular season matches and a National Championship. However, that only lasted for a year as in 2018, they did not stage regular season matches and cancelled the National Championship Game. The only two ONEFA teams that have maintained scheduling games (preseason) from 2013-2019 are the Borregos Salvajes Monterrey and the Auténticos Tigres UANL.

The universities that originally participated in the ONEFA were Universidad Autónoma de Nuevo León, Universidad Autónoma de Chapingo, Instituto Politécnico Nacional, Universidad Autónoma de Coahuila, Universidad Autónoma de Chihuahua and Universidad Autónoma Agraria Antonio Narro.

Today the ONEFA is formed by 100 teams divided into four categories: Liga Mayor (College), Liga Intermedia (Undergrad/ Varsity High School, Liga Juvenil (two categories – Junior High/ Middle School), and Liga Infantil (six categories – Middle School/ Elementary School).

The most important one is the Liga Mayor ("Major League" – college level), whose championships are organized into two conferences: the Big 14 Conference, and the National Conference. The champion of the National Conference was promoted to the Big 14 Conference taking the spot of the team in last place which, in turn, was relegated to the National Conference. Since the 2021 season, there are 33 teams participating.

== Teams ==
The following teams are members of Liga Mayor. Liga Mayor has 2 conferences: 14 Grandes (Big 14) and Nacional (National). Enrollment numbers represent all campuses of each university.

| Institution - Campus | Location | Affiliation | Team | Stadium | Capacity | Head coach |
14 Grandes Conference
| Instituto Politécnico Nacional - Santo Tomás | Miguel Hidalgo, Mexico City | Public | Águilas Blancas IPN | Wilfrido Massieu | 13,000 | Enrique Zárate |
| Universidad Autónoma de Nuevo León - University City | San Nicolás de los Garza, Nuevo León | Public | Auténticos Tigres UANL | Gaspar Mass | 16,000 | Juan Antonio Zamora |
| Universidad de las Américas Puebla | Cholula, Puebla | Private | Aztecas UDLAP | Templo del Dolor | 4,500 | Raúl Rivera |
| Monterrey Institute of Technology and Higher Education - CCM | Tlalpan, Mexico City | Private | Borregos Salvajes CCM | Estadio ITESM CCM | 2,500 | Hugo Lira |
| Monterrey Institute of Technology and Higher Education - CEM | Atizapán de Zaragoza, State of Mexico | Private | Borregos Salvajes CEM | Corral de Plástico | 6,000 | Gustavo Tella |
| Monterrey Institute of Technology and Higher Education - Guadalajara | Guadalajara, Jalisco | Private | Borregos Salvajes Guadalajara | La Fortaleza Azul | 3,500 | Ernesto Alfaro |
| Monterrey Institute of Technology and Higher Education - Monterrey | Monterrey, Nuevo León | Private | Borregos Salvajes Monterrey | Banorte | 10,057 | Carlos Altamirano |
| Monterrey Institute of Technology and Higher Education - Puebla | Puebla City, Puebla | Private | Borregos Salvajes Puebla | Cráter Azul | 3,000 | Eric Fisher |
| Instituto Politécnico Nacional - Zacatenco | Gustavo A. Madero, Mexico City | Public | Burros Blancos IPN | Wilfrido Massieu | 13,000 | Jovanni Carrillo |
| Anahuac University - Cancún | Cancún, Quintana Roo | Private | Leones Anáhuac Cancún | Coliseo Maya | 4,500 | Jorge Jiménez |
| Anahuac University - México Norte | Huixquilucan, State of Mexico | Private | Leones Anáhuac México Norte | La Cueva del León | 5,000 | Jair Buendía |
| Universidad del Valle de México - Lomas Verdes | Naucalpan, State of Mexico | Private | Linces UVM | José Ortega Martínez | 3,700 | Rodrigo Pérez |
| National Autonomous University of Mexico - University City | Coyoacán, Mexico City | Public | Pumas CU | Olímpico Universitario | 48,297 | César Belmonte |
| Centro de Enseñanza Técnica y Superior - Mexicali | Mexicali, Baja California | Private | Zorros CETYS | Madriguera de los Zorros | 2,000 | Luis Cervantes |
National Conference - North
| Autonomous University of Chihuahua | Chihuahua City, Chihuahua | Public | Águilas UACH | Olímpico Universitario José Reyes Baeza | 22,000 | Javier Trevizo |
| Autonomous University of Baja California - Tijuana | Tijuana, Baja California | Public | Cimarrones UABC | Cimarrón | 2,000 | Ricardo Licona |
| Universidad Autónoma de Ciudad Juárez - University City | Ciudad Juárez, Chihuahua | Public | Indios UACJ | Complejo Deportivo Universitario Ciudad Juárez | 2,000 | Alfredo Martínez |
| Instituto Tecnológico de Ciudad Juárez | Ciudad Juárez, Chihuahua | Public | Liebres ITCJ | ITCJ | 1,500 | Pedro Gallegos |
| Autonomous University of Coahuila - Saltillo | Saltillo, Coahuila | Public | Lobos UAdeC | Jorge A. Castro Medina | 3,476 | Ángel Esparza |
| Sonora Institute of Technology - Obregón | Ciudad Obregón, Sonora | Public | Potros ITSON | Campo Hundido | 2,000 | Jorge Aguilar |
National Conference - Bajío
| University of the Incarnate Word - Bajío | Irapuato, Guanajuato | Private | Incarnate Word Cardinals | El Nido | 2,000 | Edgar Cervantes |
| Autonomous University of Tamaulipas - Ciudad Victoria | Ciudad Victoria, Tamaulipas | Public | Correcaminos UAT | Eugenio Alvizo Porras | 5,000 | Guillermo Fierro |
| Anahuac University - Querétaro | Querétaro City, Querétaro | Private | Leones Anáhuac Querétaro | Olimpo Naranja | 2,000 | Miguel Estrada |
| Universidad Latina de México | Celaya, Guanajuato | Private | Lobos ULM | ULM | 2,000 | Alejandro Alamilla |
| Arkansas State University - Querétaro | Querétaro City, Querétaro | Public | ASUCQ Red Wolves | Red Cave | 2,000 | Gerardo Tajonar |
| Universidad Autónoma de Guadalajara - University City | Zapopan, Jalisco | Private | Tecos UAG | Tres de Marzo | 18,779 | Roberto Salas |
National Conference - Centre
| Instituto Politécnico Nacional - Santo Tomás | Miguel Hidalgo, Mexico City | Public | Búhos IPN | Casco de Santo Tomás | 2,000 | Guillermo Núñez |
| Universidad del Tepeyac | Gustavo A. Madero, Mexico City | Private | Frailes UT | Deportivo Venustiano Carranza | 500 | Jaime Labastida |
| Universidad Veracruzana - Xalapa | Xalapa, Veracruz | Public | Halcones UV | USBI | 3,500 | José Luis Izquierdo |
| Grupo Educativo Siglo 21 | San Miguel Zinacantepec, State of Mexico | Private | Panteras S21 | Fortaleza Siglo XXI | 1,500 | César Pérez |
| Autonomous University of Mexico State - University City | Toluca, State of Mexico | Public | Potros Salvajes UAEM | Juan Josafat Pichardo | 4,000 | Ricardo Jiménez |
| National Autonomous University of Mexico - Acatlán | Naucalpan, State of Mexico | Public | Pumas Acatlán | FES Acatlán | 3,000 | Horacio García Aponte |
| Chapingo Autonomous University | Texcoco, State of Mexico | Public | Toros Salvajes UACh | P. R. Tapia | 3,500 | Daniel Cruz |

== National champions ==
- Year with one national champion (Big 12 Conference), Central Conference which was not the top level, was recognized as national champion.
- Year with two national champions, one champion for the top level Conference (Big 8 Conference) and other for the National Conference.
- Years with one National Champion (Central Conference) and the other Conferences recognized as national champions although they were not the top level.
- † Defunct conference

| Year | Champion | Runner-up | Score | Head Coach | Conference |
|---|---|---|---|---|---|
| 1978 | Cóndores UNAM | Águilas Blancas IPN | 23-14 | Diego García Miravete |
| 1979 | Cóndores UNAM | Águilas Blancas IPN | 28-16 | Diego García Miravete |
| 1980 | Cóndores UNAM | Águilas Blancas IPN | 28-26 | Diego García Miravete |
| 1981 | Águilas Blancas IPN | Águilas Reales UNAM | 39-21 | Jacinto Licea Mendoza |
| 1982 | Águilas Blancas IPN | Cóndores UNAM | 16-8 | Jacinto Licea Mendoza |
| 1983 | Cóndores UNAM | Águilas Blancas IPN | 23-3 | Diego García Miravete |
| 1984 | Cóndores UNAM | Águilas Blancas IPN | 40-29 | Diego García Miravete |
| 1985 | Cóndores UNAM | Pieles Rojas IPN | 31-0 | Diego García Miravete |
| 1986 | Cóndores UNAM | | | Diego García Miravete |
| 1987 | Osos Acatlán UNAM | Cóndores UNAM | 17-10 | Arturo Alonso Escobar |
| 1988 | Águilas Blancas IPN | Cóndores UNAM | 38-6 | Jacinto Licea Mendoza |
| 1989 | Pieles Rojas IPN | Águilas Blancas IPN | 14-6 | Manuel Rodero Garduño |
| 1990 | Cóndores UNAM | Águilas Blancas IPN | 16-3 | Diego García Miravete |
| 1991 | Cóndores UNAM | Borregos Salvajes Monterrey ITESM | 41-16 | Diego García Miravete |
| 1992 | Águilas Blancas IPN | Centinelas CGP | 17-13 | Jacinto Licea Mendoza |
| 1993 | Borregos Salvajes Monterrey ITESM | Águilas Blancas IPN | 20-13 | Frank González |
| 1994 | Borregos Salvajes Monterrey ITESM | Aztecas UDLAP | 17-10 | Frank González |
| 1995 | Aztecas UDLAP | Cóndores UNAM | 43-13 | Leonardo Luján |
| 1996 | Aztecas UDLAP | Borregos Salvajes Monterrey ITESM | 6-3 | Leonardo Luján |
| 1997 | Aztecas UDLAP | Borregos Salvajes Monterrey ITESM | 21-11 | Leonardo Luján |
| 1998 | Borregos Salvajes Monterrey ITESM | Aztecas UDLAP | 20-17 | Frank González |
| 1999 | Borregos Salvajes Monterrey ITESM | Aztecas UDLAP | 38-25 | Frank González |
| 2000 | Borregos Salvajes CEM ITESM | Borregos Salvajes Monterrey ITESM | 38-28 | Rafael Duk |
| 2001 | Borregos Salvajes Monterrey ITESM | Auténticos Tigres UANL | 20-12 | Frank González |
| 2002 | Borregos Salvajes Monterrey ITESM | Auténticos Tigres UANL | 34-7 | Frank González |
| 2003 | Borregos Salvajes CEM ITESM | Borregos Salvajes Monterrey ITESM | 38-36 | Enrique Borda |
| 2004 | Borregos Salvajes Monterrey ITESM | Borregos Salvajes CEM ITESM | 45-22 | Frank González |
| 2005 | Borregos Salvajes Monterrey ITESM | Auténticos Tigres UANL | 14-10 | Frank González |
| 2006 | Borregos Salvajes Monterrey ITESM | Aztecas UDLAP | 43-34 | Frank González |
| 2007 | Borregos Salvajes Monterrey ITESM | Borregos Salvajes CEM ITESM | 36-14 | Frank González |
| 2008 | Pumas CU UNAM | Águilas Blancas IPN | 17-0 | Raúl Rivera | Central Conference |
| 2008 | Borregos Salvajes Monterrey ITESM | Auténticos Tigres UANL | 41-28 | Frank González | Big 12 Conference^{†} |
| 2009 | Lobos UAdeC | Águilas UACH | 34-21 | Fernando Bravo | North Conference^{†} |
| 2009 | Auténticos Tigres UANL | Pumas CU UNAM | 42-21 | Pedro Morales | Central Conference^{†} |
| 2009 | Leones Anáhuac Cancún | Potros Salvajes UAEM | 20-19 | Marco Martos | South Conference^{†} |
| 2010 | Águilas UACH | Linces UVM Guadalajara | 37-22 | Carlos Altamirano | North Conference^{†} |
| 2010 | Pumas CU UNAM | Auténticos Tigres UANL | 31-21 | Raul Rivera | Central Conference^{†} |
| 2010 | Potros Salvajes UAEM | Leones Anáhuac Cancún | 23-20 | Carmelo Velazquez | South Conference^{†} |
| 2011 | Linces UVM Guadalajara | Águilas UACH | 35-28 | Enrique Villanueva | North Conference^{†} |
| 2011 | Auténticos Tigres UANL | Pumas CU UNAM | 16-15 | Pedro Morales | Central Conference^{†} |
| 2011 | Centinelas CGP | Pumas Acatlán UNAM | 28-14 | Jorge Joaquín Juárez | South Conference^{†} |
| 2012 | Auténticos Tigres UANL | Pumas CU UNAM | 34-20 | Pedro Morales | Big 8 Conference |
| 2012 | Potros Salvajes UAEM | Pumas Acatlán UNAM | 40-28 (SE) | Carmelo Velazquez | National Conference |
| 2013 | Pumas CU UNAM | Auténticos Tigres UANL | 28-16 | Raul Rivera | Big 8 Conference |
| 2013 | Pumas Acatlán UNAM | Lobos UAdeC | 45-38 | Enrique Zapata | National Conference |
| 2014 | Pumas CU UNAM | Auténticos Tigres UANL | 21-14 | Raul Rivera | Big 8 Conference |
| 2014 | Lobos UAdeC | Leones Anáhuac Cancún | 29-22 | Francisco Cárdenas | National Conference |
| 2015 | Auténticos Tigres UANL | Pumas CU UNAM | 16-7 | Pedro Morales | Tazon Tapatío Mendez |
| 2015 | Tecos UAG | Toros Salvajes UACh | 16-6 | Roberto Salas | Final Grupo Rojo |
| 2016 | Auténticos Tigres UANL | Pumas CU UNAM | 20-16 | Pedro Morales | National Final |
| 2017 | Pumas CU UNAM | Auténticos Tigres UANL | 18-15 | Otto Becerril | Final Grupo Verde |
| 2018 | Auténticos Tigres UANL | Burros Blancos IPN | 23-20 | Francisco Chaparro | Final Grupo Verde |
| 2019 | Burros Blancos IPN | Águilas Blancas IPN | 24-17 | Agustin López | Jacinto Licea |
| 2020 | No champion |
| 2021 | No champion |
| 2022 | Borregos Salvajes Monterrey ITESM | Auténticos Tigres UANL | 32-30 | Carlos Altamirano | 14 Grandes Conference |
| 2023 | Borregos Salvajes Monterrey ITESM | Auténticos Tigres UANL | 31-27 | Carlos Altamirano | 14 Grandes Conference |
| 2024 | Borregos Salvajes Monterrey ITESM | Auténticos Tigres UANL | 24-21 | Carlos Altamirano | 14 Grandes Conference |
| 2025 | Auténticos Tigres UANL | Borregos Salvajes Monterrey ITESM | 33-30 | Antonio Zamora | 14 Grandes Conference |

== See also ==
- Asociación de Básquetbol Estudiantil
