= Pumas CU football =

Varsity American football team

- First season: 1927
- Athletic director: Alejandro Fernández Varela
- Head coach: José Luis Canales Rivera
- Location: Mexico City
- Stadium: Estadio Olímpico Universitario (capacity: 72,000)
- League: ONEFA
- Conference: Conferencia 14 Grandes
- Colors: Navy blue and Gold

National championships
- Claimed: 22 (1933, 1934, 1935, 1936, 1937, 1938, 1939, 1940, 1941, 1942, 1943, 1944, 1946, 1947, 1951, 1952, 1956, 1957, 1959, 1961, 1966, 1967)

Conference championships
- 5 (Centro: 2; 8 Grandes: 2; Verde: 1)
- Rivalries: IPN; UANL

Uniforms
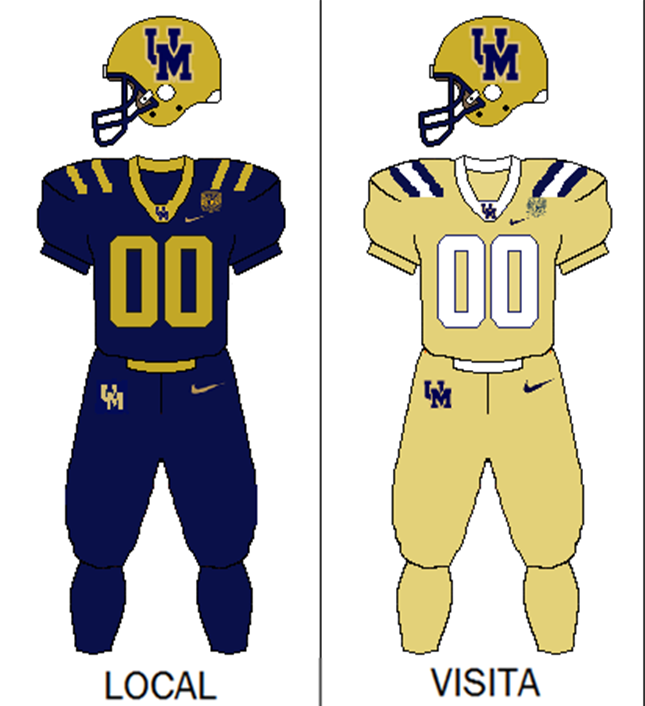
- Outfitter: Nike

The Pumas CU football program represents the National Autonomous University of Mexico (Spanish: Universidad Nacional Autónoma de México, UNAM) in college football at the Organización Nacional Estudiantil de Fútbol Americano (ONEFA) level. UNAM has competed in the Liga Mayor since the 2014 season. The team is led by head coach José Luis Canales. The Pumas plays its home games at Estadio Olímpico Universitario in Mexico City. They maintain a fierce rivalry with teams from the National Polytechnic Institute (Spanish: Instituto Politécnico Nacional, or IPN) particularly with its Miguel Hidalgo-based team from Santo Tomás, Águilas Blancas.

== History ==
The team was founded in 1927 by a group of students led by the Noriega brothers, but it wasn't until 1931 when Pumas was officially the varsity team of the National Autonomous University of Mexico. In addition, American oil magnate Harry Ford Sinclair sponsored the team with generous donations until 1935. In the early years, Pumas had a long string of consecutive championships from 1933 to 1945 (including an appearance in the 1945 Sun Bowl; this was followed by the so-called "Golden Age" of 1946 to 1957. Between the years 1958 and 1969 the team consolidated its position within ONEFA, Mexico's league of American football. For the period 1970–1980 the university authorities decided to disband the team and create three teams (Cóndores/Condors; Aguilas Reales/Royal Eagles; and Guerreros Aztecas/Aztec Warriors), from 1981 to 1990 only the Cóndores could reclaim the tradition of the Pumas and win championships. In 1998, the University government decided to reduce to one team per campus and created Pumas CU and Acatlan. Unfortunately, conditions within the league and the existence of other powerful newcomer squads undermined the strength and dominance of the team. Its first position tradition vanished rapidly during the seasons of 1998 to 2007. From 1969 until 2002, the Pumas Dorados team consisted of a selection of the best players of all UNAM teams. These teams didn't play any regular season games, but rather the Pumas Dorados used to play a Classic game against the Burros Blancos at the end of season, until 2002 when this event was suspended.

== Championships ==
=== National championships ===
Season	Head coach
1933	Reginald D. Root
1934	Converse Killculler
1935	Dixie Howell
1936	Charlie Marr
1937	Charlie Marr
1938	Gonzalo Flores
1939	Ernesto Navas
1940	Ernesto Navas
1941	Bernard A. Hoban
1942	Roberto Mendez
1943	Bernard A. Hoban
1944	Bernard A. Hoban
1946	Roberto Mendez
1947	Roberto Mendez
1951	Roberto Mendez
1952	Roberto Mendez
1956	Roberto Mendez
1957	Roberto Mendez
1959	Roberto Mendez
1961	Roberto Mendez
1966	Manuel Neri
1967	Manuel Neri

=== ONEFA championships ===
Season	Head coach
*+ 2008	Raúl Rivera
*+ 2010	Raúl Rivera
*+ 2013	Raúl Rivera
2014	Raúl Rivera
2017	Raúl Rivera

- In 2008 was created another league for the major category in Mexico (Liga Mayor) and the National Championship is shared in 2 leagues since then.

+ This is not the same team as previous Pumas Dorados teams. Championships in 2008 and 2010 were won by the Main Campus (CU). There is another Pumas team located in Acatlan Campus. Pumas Dorados currently represents a selection of the best players of both Pumas teams and the last selection was made in 2002 and played against a selection of the best players of the IPN.

== Rivalry ==
The team has an historic rivalry with Aguilas Blancas IPN, due to both of them being the biggest public universities in the country. More recently, major rivalries arose with Borregos Salvajes ITESM, Borregos Salvajes CEM, Aztecas UDLAP and Auténticos Tigres UANL.

== Venue ==
The team plays at the Estadio Olímpico Universitario in Mexico City, inaugurated in 1952 with the game between Pumas and Burros Blancos. Capacity: 72000.

== Players ==
=== Players in the CFL ===
As of January 2020, the following players have played at least one game with a Canadian Football League team.

- Andrés Salgado, WR, Calgary Stampeders
