= 2023 Fundidores de Monterrey season =

- Head coach: Carlos Strevel (fired 9 April; 3–2 record); Jorge Valdez (0–1 record)
- Home stadium: Estadio Banorte

Results
- Record: 3–3

The 2023 Fundidores de Monterrey season is the Fundidores de Monterrey seventh season in the Liga de Fútbol Americano Profesional (LFA) and their fourth under head coach Carlos Strevel.

The Fundidores will come into 2023 as the defending Tazón México champions, after defeating Gallos Negros de Querétaro in the Tazón México V.

The team debuted losing against Reds 15–31.

On 9 April 2023, the team removed head coach Carlos Strevel and Carlos Mercado, defensive coordinator. They were replaced by Jorge Valdez as the Fundidores' new head coach and defensive coordinator. Valdez debuted with a defeat 14–21 against Raptors.

== Draft ==
2023 Fundidores de Monterrey draft
Round	Pick	Player	Position	School
1	5	Isaac Cuevas	OL	ITESM Monterrey
2	18	Claudio Montalvo	TE	UANL
3	28	Carlos Valdez	RB	UANL
4	37	Oscar Muñoz	DB	UNAM
5	46	Ricardo Angüiz	QB	IPN
6	58	Jorge Castro	OL	IPN

== Roster ==
Fundidores de Monterrey roster
Quarterbacks: 13 Ricardo Angüiz; 8 Shelton Eppler; 16 Erik Luján; Running backs: 32 Brandon Calzoncit; 9 Aaron McCallister; 29 Abraham Sosa; 24 Fernando Villanueva; Wide receivers: 4 Tavarious Battiste; 82 César González; 2 Torin Justice; 81 Daniel Lozano; 85 Daniel Peña; 17 Ramsés Ramos; 6 Fernando Richarte; 83 Marco Sosa; Tight ends: 39 Tommy Auger; 12 Claudio Montalvo	Offensive linemen: 71 Jorge Alvarado; 66 Max Castellanos; 76 Isaac Cuevas; 53 Juan Pablo Garza; 70 Colton Lamson; 58 Emilio Pérez; 69 Saúl Sauceda; 71 Jorge Luis Villegas; 78 Raymundo Vega; Defensive linemen: 14 Darius Allen; 91 Marco Álvarez; 42 David Garza; 90 Joan Lara; 96 Joshua Little; 97 Martín Maldonado; 3 Uriel Martínez; 92 Daniel Moreno; 7 Andrew Salas	Linebackers: 25 Emilio Castillón; 11 Sebastián González; 5 Christian Hernández; 47 Solomon Jackson; 28 Itan Salas; 56 Xavier Woodson-Luster; Defensive backs: 0 Jeremy Cruter; 22 Carlos Díaz; 21 Javier García; 18 Cosme Lozano; 1 Prince Robinson; 27 Ricardo Sáenz; 23 Javier Sánchez; 20 Sebastián Sierra; Special teams: 19 Ricardo Aguilar K
Italics indicate International player Roster updated 04-04-2023

== Staff ==
Fundidores de Monterrey staff
Front office: Owners – Fabián Marcos, Carlos Lankenau, David Pérez-Salinas; General manager – José Luis Domene; Marketing / PR director – Carlos Lankenau; Head coach: Head coach – Jorge Valdez	Offensive coaches: Offensive coordinator – Alfredo Hernández; Running backs – Joel Rodríguez; Offensive line – Joaquín Dávila; Defensive coaches: Defensive coordinator – Jorge Valdez; Defensive line – Miguel Ángel Alvarado

== Regular season ==
=== Standings ===
Liga de Fútbol Americano Profesional
Pos	Team	GP	W	L	PF	PA	Stk	Qualification
1	Caudillos	10	10	0	362	188	W10	Advance to Semi-finals
2	Dinos	10	7	3	285	252	L1	Advance to Semi-finals
3	Reyes	10	7	3	272	250	W2	Advance to Wild Card
4	Reds	10	6	4	260	189	L2	Advance to Wild Card
5	Fundidores	10	6	4	297	237	W3	Advance to Wild Card
6	Galgos	10	5	5	214	216	W1	Advance to Wild Card
7	Raptors	10	4	6	203	228	L3	
8	Mexicas	10	3	7	178	216	W1	
9	Gallos Negros	10	1	9	166	364	L1	
10	Jefes	10	1	9	201	295	L4	
Tiebreakers
1. Head-to-head; 2. Points against 3. Average between points scored and points against 4. Best net points in common games 5. Best net points in all games 6. Coin toss

Source: LFA

=== Schedule ===
Week	Date	Time	Opponent	Result	Record	Venue	TV	Recap
1	5 March	17:00 (UTC–6)	Reds	L 15–31	0–1	Estadio Banorte	Claro Sports	Recap
2	12 March	14:00 (UTC–7)	at Jefes	W 28–21	1–1	Estadio 20 de Noviembre	Claro Sports	Recap
3	19 March	17:00 (UTC–6)	Gallos Negros	W 34–31	2–1	Estadio Banorte	Claro Sports	Recap
4	26 March	17:00 (UTC–6)	Reyes	W 31–7	3–1	Estadio Banorte	Claro Sports	Recap
5	3 April	19:00 (UTC–6)	at Dinos	L 31–38	3–2	Estadio Francisco I. Madero	Claro Sports	Recap
6	16 April	12:00 (UTC–6)	at Raptors	L 14–21	3–3	Estadio José Ortega Martínez	Claro Sports	Recap
7	23 April	17:00 (UTC–6)	Caudillos			Estadio Banorte	TBA	Recap
8	29 April	20:00 (UTC–6)	at Mexicas			Estadio Jesús Martínez "Palillo"	TBA	Recap
9	5 May	19:00 (UTC–8)	at Galgos			Estadio Caliente	TBA	Recap
10	14 May	17:00 (UTC–6)	Dinos			Estadio Banorte	TBA	Recap
