= 2023 Reyes de Jalisco season =

American football team season

- Head coach: Ernesto Alfaro
- Home stadium: Fortaleza Azul

Results
- Record: 4–2

The 2023 Reyes de Jalisco season is the Reyes de Jalisco second season in the Liga de Fútbol Americano Profesional (LFA) and their second under head coach Ernesto Alfaro.

The Reyes started the season with a victory over Gallos Negros 42–14. On their next match, they defeated Raptors for the first team in the team's history.

== Draft ==
2023 Reyes de Jalisco draft
Round	Pick	Player	Position	School
1	3	Johan Vázquez	OL	UANL
2	13	Raúl Espinoza	OL	ITESM Puebla
2	17	Miguel Ángel Aguilar	LB	UNAM
2	19	Alfonso Mendoza	LB	UVM
3	23	Alejandro Coronado	WR	UAC
4	31	Alejandro Rodríguez	DL	ITESM Guadalajara
4	33	César García	LB	IPN
4	36	Christopher Real	DL	UAG
5	42	Jair Rivero	DL	UAG
5	53	Rodrigo Rojas	WR	UAG
6	61	Arturo Calderón	TE	ITESM Querétaro
7	67	Fernando Ascencio	DL	ITESM Guadalajara
8	72	Ezequiel Morales	QB	UAG

== Roster ==
Reyes de Jalisco roster
Quarterbacks: 8 Carlos Farías; 15 Ezequiel Morales; 10 Shannon Patrick; Running backs: 4 Majid Esparza; 32 David Poblete; 38 Jordon Shippy; Wide receivers: 2 Rodnell Cruell; 14 Alejandro Coronado; 12 Carlos Cuenca; 21 Carlos Gómez; 1 Devin Heckstall; 17 José Luis Leal; 0 Tavares Martin; 19 Christopher Reyes; 16 Misael Salas; Tight ends: 45 Arturo Calderón; 82 Marcelo Zumalacarregui	Offensive linemen: 78 Raúl Espinoza; 79 Alberto Gracia; 77 Rodrigo Jurado; 72 Armando Macías; 69 Patricio Muñoz; 58 Rickey Benson Jr.; 52 Gabriel Sánchez; 70 Aldair Vázquez; Defensive linemen: 92 Fernando Ascencio; 99 Shuan Funnye; 55 Emmit Gooden; 11 Jorge Licea; 53 Christopher Real; 75 Alejandro Rodríguez; 95 Irving Rivero	Linebackers: 18 Miguel Aguilar; 44 Juan Pablo Alegría; 9 Caleb Becerra; 40 Víctor Camacho; 90 Alfonso Mendoza; 56 Anthony Patrick; 24 Juan Francisco Pérez; 13 Rodrigo Rojas; 36 Cristian Treviño; Defensive backs: 29 Alejandro Aguilera; 6 Salvador Cabrera; 3 DeMario Donnell; 22 DeAndre Elliott; 31 Oscar Herrera; 26 Luis Daniel Rivera; 5 Kobe Rodgers; 27 Emiliano Sánchez; 30 Saúl Sánchez; Special teams: 7 Enrique Yenny K
Italics indicate International player Roster updated 20-04-2023

== Staff ==
Reyes de Jalisco staff
Head coach: Head coach – Ernesto Alfaro; Offensive coaches: Offensive coordinator – Carlos Cabral; Running backs – Mauricio Islas; Wide receivers – Vicente Álvarez; Offensive line – Jonathan Segura	Defensive coaches: Defensive coordinator – Víctor Saspe; Defensive line – Octavio Martínez; Linebackers – Arturo Esquivel; Defensive backs – Pedro Ramírez

== Regular season ==
=== Standings ===
Liga de Fútbol Americano Profesional
Pos	Team	GP	W	L	PF	PA	Stk	Qualification
1	Caudillos	10	10	0	362	188	W10	Advance to Semi-finals
2	Dinos	10	7	3	285	252	L1	Advance to Semi-finals
3	Reyes	10	7	3	272	250	W2	Advance to Wild Card
4	Reds	10	6	4	260	189	L2	Advance to Wild Card
5	Fundidores	10	6	4	297	237	W3	Advance to Wild Card
6	Galgos	10	5	5	214	216	W1	Advance to Wild Card
7	Raptors	10	4	6	203	228	L3	
8	Mexicas	10	3	7	178	216	W1	
9	Gallos Negros	10	1	9	166	364	L1	
10	Jefes	10	1	9	201	295	L4	
Tiebreakers
1. Head-to-head; 2. Points against 3. Average between points scored and points against 4. Best net points in common games 5. Best net points in all games 6. Coin toss

Source: LFA

=== Schedule ===
Week	Date	Time	Opponent	Result	Record	Venue	TV	Recap
1	4 March	17:00 (UTC–6)	Gallos Negros	W 42–14	1–0	Fortaleza Azul	Claro Sports	Recap
2	11 March	17:00 (UTC–6)	at Raptors	W 23–16	2–0	Estadio José Ortega Martínez	Claro Sports	Recap
3	18 March	17:00 (UTC–6)	Mexicas	W 17–13	3–0	Fortaleza Azul	Claro Sports	Recap
4	26 March	17:00 (UTC–6)	at Fundidores	L 7–31	3–1	Estadio Banorte	Claro Sports	Recap
5	1 April	17:00 (UTC–6)	Caudillos	L 14–48	3–2	Fortaleza Azul	Claro Sports	Recap
6	14 April	19:00 (UTC–8)	at Galgos	W 14–8	4–2	Estadio Caliente	Claro Sports	Recap
7	22 April	17:00 (UTC–6)	Jefes			Fortaleza Azul	TBA	Recap
8	29 April	17:00 (UTC–6)	Dinos			Fortaleza Azul	TBA	Recap
9	6 May	13:00 (UTC–6)	at Reds			Estadio ITESM CCM	TBA	Recap
10	13 May	17:00 (UTC–6)	at Gallos Negros			Estadio Olímpico de Querétaro	TBA	Recap
