= 2023 Mexicas de la Ciudad de México season =

- Head coach: Héctor Toxqui
- Home stadium: Estadio Jesús Martínez "Palillo"

Results
- Record: 3–7
- Playoffs: Did not qualify

The 2023 Mexicas de la Ciudad de México season is the Mexicas de la Ciudad de México eighth season in the Liga de Fútbol Americano Profesional (LFA) and their fourth under head coach Héctor Toxqui.

Mexicas opened the season with an upset, after losing to Galgos 6–24, in what was Galgos' first victory in its history. The team won its first game the next week against Gallos Negros, 17–14, in a match played at the Estadio Olímpico de Querétaro. On Week 6, Mexicas lost against Jefes de Ciudad Juárez, 27–33, in what was the Jefes' first ever LFA victory.

== Draft ==
2023 Mexicas de la Ciudad de México draft
Round	Pick	Player	Position	School
1	4	Cristóbal Luna	OL	UNAM
2	14	Fabrizzio Giombini	DB	FES Acatlán
4	34	Fernando Socorro	LB	UNAM
5	43	Anuar de la Concha	WR	UNAM
5	54	Jaime García	RB	IPN
6	62	Edson Martínez	WR	Anáhuac Norte
7	68	Fernando Rodríguez	WR	UNAM

== Roster ==
Mexicas de la Ciudad de México roster
Quarterbacks: 13 Brandon López; 6 Alejandro Márquez; 5 Ricardo Quintana; Running backs: 42 José Bárcenas; 23 Aarón García; 30 Mario Salgado; 21 Jesús Sosa; 3 Noah Whittle; Wide receivers: 81 Ricardo Castro; 2 Christian Gómez; 16 Eduardo Jiménez; 14 Mario Ortiz; 19 Edgar Rincón; 17 Ditter Smith; 18 Jordan Terrell; 84 Guillermo Villalobos	Offensive linemen: 65 Eduardo Aguirre; 73 Freddy Alvarado; 77 Daniel Concepción; 61 Ulises Espinosa; 79 Oliver González; 59 Christopher Hernández; 58 Gabriel Luna; 75 Abel Oxamendi; 72 Roberto Vázquez; Defensive linemen: 15 Fernando Bermúdez; 55 Daniel Ceniceros; 8 Diego Magaña; 44 Rashad Dillard; 12 César Pérez; 99 Hiram Ramírez; 31 Diego Ruiz	Linebackers: 36 Aaron Cook; 0 Lennin Ortiz; 7 José Luis Santana; 34 Fernando Mohedano; 52 Federico Solís; 50 Alan Zárate; 26 Fernando Zárate; Defensive backs: 10 Jerónimo Arzate; 37 Gerardo Camacho; 24 Tonatiuh Chagoya; 25 Fabricio Giombini; 29 Christopher Heredia; 1 Ricardo Razo; 9 Eldridge Thompson; 27 César Torres; 20 Tommy Trohatos; Special teams: 11 Gabriel Amavizca K
Italics indicate International player Roster updated 19-04-2023

== Staff ==
Mexicas de la Ciudad de México staff
Front office: Owner – Juan José Aguirre; Sporting director – Marco Montes; Head coach: Head coach – Héctor Toxqui	Offensive coaches: Offensive coordinator – Sergio Lavanderos; Running backs – Yair Salgado; Wide receivers – Enrique Mora; Offensive line – Jonathan Cuéllar; Offensive line – Juan Carlos Pérez; Defensive coaches: Defensive coordinator – Fernando Rodríguez; Defensive line – Alberto Campos; Defensive backs – Carlos Munguía

== Regular season ==
=== Standings ===
Liga de Fútbol Americano Profesional
Pos	Team	GP	W	L	PF	PA	Stk	Qualification
1	Caudillos	10	10	0	362	188	W10	Advance to Semi-finals
2	Dinos	10	7	3	285	252	L1	Advance to Semi-finals
3	Reyes	10	7	3	272	250	W2	Advance to Wild Card
4	Reds	10	6	4	260	189	L2	Advance to Wild Card
5	Fundidores	10	6	4	297	237	W3	Advance to Wild Card
6	Galgos	10	5	5	214	216	W1	Advance to Wild Card
7	Raptors	10	4	6	203	228	L3	
8	Mexicas	10	3	7	178	216	W1	
9	Gallos Negros	10	1	9	166	364	L1	
10	Jefes	10	1	9	201	295	L4	
Tiebreakers
1. Head-to-head; 2. Points against 3. Average between points scored and points against 4. Best net points in common games 5. Best net points in all games 6. Coin toss

Source: LFA

=== Schedule ===
Week	Date	Time	Opponent	Result	Record	Venue	TV	Recap
1	5 March	12:00 (UTC–6)	Galgos	L 6–24	0–1	Estadio Jesús Martínez "Palillo"	Claro Sports	Recap
2	11 March	17:00 (UTC–6)	at Gallos Negros	W 17–14	1–1	Estadio Olímpico de Querétaro	Claro Sports/AYM Sports	Recap
3	18 March	17:00 (UTC–6)	at Reyes	L 13–17	1–2	Fortaleza Azul	TVC Deportes/Claro Sports	Recap
4	25 March	20:00 (UTC–6)	Caudillos	L 34–42	1–3	Estadio MCA Jaime Labastida	Claro Sports	Recap
5	1 April	20:00 (UTC–6)	Raptors	L 0–15	1–4	Estadio Jesús Martínez "Palillo"	Claro Sports	Recap
6	16 April	14:00 (UTC–6)	at Jefes	L 27–33	1–5	Estadio 20 de Noviembre	Claro Sports	Recap
7	22 April	20:00 (UTC–6)	Reds			Estadio Jesús Martínez "Palillo"	TBA	Recap
8	29 April	20:00 (UTC–6)	Fundidores			Estadio Jesús Martínez "Palillo"	TBA	Recap
9	6 May	20:00 (UTC–6)	at Dinos			Estadio Francisco I. Madero	TBA	Recap
10	14 May	12:00 (UTC–6)	at Raptors			Estadio Ciudad de los Deportes	TBA	Recap
