= 2023 Galgos de Tijuana season =

American football team season

- Head coach: Héctor del Águila
- Home stadium: Estadio Caliente

Results
- Record: 5-5
- Playoffs: Lost in Wildcard (vs Reyes) 3–15

The 2023 Galgos de Tijuana season was the Galgos de Tijuana second season in the Liga de Fútbol Americano Profesional (LFA) and their first under head coach Héctor del Águila.

Galgos opened the season with a victory, the first ever in the team's history, against Mexicas, 24–6.

== Draft ==
2023 Galgos de Tijuana draft
Round	Pick	Player	Position	School
1	6	José Pablo Sánchez	DB	IPN
2	15	Manuel Espriú	WR	ITESM Querétaro
2	16	José Gutiérrez	DB	IPN
3	22	Armando Macías	OL	IPN
3	24	Álvaro Vinageras	LB	UNAM
3	26	César González	WR	UANL
4	32	Ricardo Zamora	DB	UABC
5	41	Emmanuel Mariscal	OL	IPN
5	52	Rodrigo de la Rosa	OL	UABC
6	60	Mauricio García	WR	IPN
7	66	Abraham Cortés	LB	UABC
7	71	Mario Barajas	OL	UABC

== Roster ==
Galgos de Tijuana roster
Quarterbacks: 4 Luis Araujo; 12 Alek Barrera; 5 Trevone Boykin; 2 Diego Ruiz; Running backs: 34 Antonio Guerrero; 11 Alejandro Mendoza; 21 Héctor Villavicencio; Wide receivers: 14 Manuel Espriú; 81 Mauricio García; 83 Alberto Lemus; 15 Alejandro Martínez; 16 Eldridge Massington; 3 Kobe Miranda; 22 Tremaine Ross; 13 Carlos Santillano; 6 Cody Smith; 1 Terrance Williams; Tight ends: 87 Osmar Marentes	Offensive linemen: 63 Saúl Alfaro; 71 Juan Manuel Candela; 78 José Carpio; 55 Rodrigo de la Rosa; 56 Cris Lira; 50 Mario Ojeda; 65 Jalen Powell; 69 William Rivera; 52 Carlos Sánchez; Defensive linemen: 20 Jonathan Arellano; 92 Diego Ibarra; 91 Eli Leal; 99 Steven Mason; 93 Jamal Newman; 90 Jorge Ortiz; 97 Carlos Ríos; 10 Maximiliano Soto	Linebackers: 17 Miguel Ángel Canseco; 30 Patricio Garza; 18 Garret LeBouef; 28 René López; 27 Michelle Pasillas; 9 Issac Pulido; 49 Fernando Rubio; 54 Felipe Sifuentes; 0 LeDevin Smith; Defensive backs: 8 Enrique Altamirano; 7 Fabio González; 26 José Gutiérrez; 23 David Richardson; 24 José Pablo Sánchez; Special teams: 19 José Manuel Vargas K
Italics indicate International player Roster updated 27-02-2023

== Regular season ==
=== Standings ===
Liga de Fútbol Americano Profesional
Pos	Team	GP	W	L	PF	PA	Stk	Qualification
1	Caudillos	10	10	0	362	188	W10	Advance to Semi-finals
2	Dinos	10	7	3	285	252	L1	Advance to Semi-finals
3	Reyes	10	7	3	272	250	W2	Advance to Wild Card
4	Reds	10	6	4	260	189	L2	Advance to Wild Card
5	Fundidores	10	6	4	297	237	W3	Advance to Wild Card
6	Galgos	10	5	5	214	216	W1	Advance to Wild Card
7	Raptors	10	4	6	203	228	L3	
8	Mexicas	10	3	7	178	216	W1	
9	Gallos Negros	10	1	9	166	364	L1	
10	Jefes	10	1	9	201	295	L4	
Tiebreakers
1. Head-to-head; 2. Points against 3. Average between points scored and points against 4. Best net points in common games 5. Best net points in all games 6. Coin toss

Source: LFA

=== Schedule ===
Week	Date	Time	Opponent	Result	Record	Venue	TV	Recap
1	5 March	12:00 (UTC–6)	at Mexicas	W 24–6	1–0	Estadio Jesús Martínez "Palillo"	Claro Sports	Recap
2	11 March	19:00 (UTC–6)	at Caudillos	L 16–51	1–1	Estadio Olímpico Universitario UACH	TBA	Recap
3	19 March	13:00 (UTC–8)	Raptors	W 27–13	2–1	Estadio Caliente	TBA	Recap
4	25 March	13:00 (UTC–6)	at Reds	L 25–36	2–2	Estadio ITESM CCM	TBA	Recap
5	19 March	19:00 (UTC–8)	Gallos Negros	W 47–13	3–2	Estadio Caliente	TBA	Recap
6	14 April	19:00 (UTC–8)	Reyes	L 8–14	3–3	Estadio Caliente	TBA	Recap
7	22 April	20:00 (UTC–6)	at Dinos	L 33–10	3–4	Estadio Francisco I. Madero	TBA	Recap
8	30 April	14:00 (UTC–6)	at Jefes	W 27–0	4–4	Estadio 20 de Noviembre	TBA	Recap
9	5 May	19:00 (UTC–8)	Fundidores	L 40–13	4-5	Estadio Caliente	TBA	Recap
10	13 May	19:00 (UTC–8)	Reds			Estadio Caliente	TBA	Recap
