= Octavio González =

Mexico gridiron football player

No. 93 – Caudillos de Chihuahua
- Position: Defensive end
- Roster status: Active
- CFL status: National

Personal information
- Born: Monterrey, Nuevo León, Mexico
- Listed height: 6 ft 3 in (1.91 m)
- Listed weight: 256 lb (116 kg)

Career information
- College: UANL
- CFL draft: 2019 LFA: 1st round, 7th overall pick

Career history
- Fundidores de Monterrey (2018–2020); BC Lions (2019)*; Parrilleros de Monterrey (2022); Caudillos de Chihuahua (2023–present)
- * Offseason or practice squad member only

Awards and highlights
- 2× Tazón México champion (VI, VII); Tazón México MVP (VI); LFA sacks leader (2024); 2× ONEFA champion (2011, 2012)

Octavio González
Medal record

Men's American football

Representing Mexico

World Championship
Bronze medal – third place	2015 Canton	Team

Octavio Noé González Chapa is a Mexican professional gridiron football defensive end for the Caudillos de Chihuahua of the Liga de Fútbol Americano Profesional (LFA). He played college football at UANL.

González spent three seasons with the Fundidores de Monterrey and was drafted by the BC Lions in the 2019 CFL–LFA draft, though he was released in training camp due to injury. He played with the Parrilleros de Monterrey of the Fútbol Americano de México league in 2022 before joining the Caudillos the following year. In 2023, González was named Tazón México MVP in Tazón México VI after aiding the team to a perfect season.

González has represented the Mexico national team, winning a bronze medal at the 2015 IFAF World Championship.

== Early life ==
A native of Monterrey, Nuevo León, González began playing American football around the age of six. He was big for his age and thus played as a fullback for the Halcones Monterrey. González moved to San Antonio, Texas, with his family when he was 12 and joined the middle school basketball team, though he later returned to Mexico.

== College career ==
González attended the Autonomous University of Nuevo León (UANL) and played college football for the Auténticos Tigres UANL as a star defensive lineman. He helped the team win back-to-back ONEFA championships in 2011 and 2012. González left the team in 2014 to join 4th & Inches Sports Performance, a training program in Arlington, Texas, which helped him improve his strength and technique. He returned to the Auténticos Tigres UANL for the 2014 season, his final year of eligibility, leading them to an appearance in the ONEFA championship game.

González was later named to the ONEFA Liga Mayor Team of the Decade for the 2010s by Mundo del Ovoide.

== Professional career ==
In January 2015, González played in the College Gridiron Showcase in Arlington, Texas, where he recorded one sack, two solo tackles, and multiple quarterback hurries in front of National Football League (NFL) scouts. He attended an NFL Regional Combine in Houston the following month, followed by Pro Day at the University of North Texas. From there, González was invited to participate in "Dallas Day", a pre-draft workout with the Dallas Cowboys, with about 50 other prospects. He was not offered a contract.

=== Fundidores de Monterrey (2018–2019) ===
After three years out of football, González signed with the Fundidores de Monterrey of the Liga de Fútbol Americano Profesional (LFA) ahead of the 2018 LFA season. He became a key member of the Fundidores defensive unit that allowed the second-fewest yards in the league (2,138). González recorded 7.5 sacks and blocked two extra points on the season. González was subsequently invited to the New York Giants rookie mini-camp in May 2018. However, he was not offered a contract.

González was selected by the BC Lions of the Canadian Football League (CFL) with the seventh overall pick of the 2019 CFL–LFA draft. He had improved his draft stock after recording 31 bench press reps at the CFL–LFA Combine in Mexico City, the most out of the select pool of 51 players. The Lions general manager, Ed Hervey, was reported to have "settled for athletic and the ability to speak English" in player evaluations.

González returned to the Fundidores de Monterrey for the 2019 LFA season. The Fundidores defense allowed a league-best 2,059 yards as González recorded a team-high five sacks on the season. However, the team was eliminated in the first round of the playoffs after a 53–47 overtime loss to the Raptors de Naucalpan. Just a few weeks later, González joined the BC Lions training camp in May along with fellow countrymen Fernando Richarte and Gerardo Álvarez. However, he was released in early June after having suffered a broken foot in camp.

González recorded one sack in 2020 before the remainder of the season was cancelled due to the COVID-19 pandemic. He also returned a blocked punt for a touchdown against the Mexicas CDMX. The 2021 LFA season was cancelled as well.

=== Parrilleros de Monterrey (2022) ===
González signed with the Parrilleros de Monterrey, an expansion team in the rival Fútbol Americano de México (FAM) league, ahead of the 2022 FAM season. He aided the team to an appearance in the Balón de Plata, the league championship game, though they lost to the Rojos CDMX.

=== Caudillos de Chihuahua (2023–present) ===
After the FAM league shut down operations, González signed with the Caudillos de Chihuahua, one of four FAM teams who joined the LFA ahead of the 2023 LFA season. The Caudillos finished the regular season with a perfect 10–0 record. González contributed four sacks on a defensive unit that led the league in fewest points allowed (188) and fewest yards allowed (3,055). He recorded two key sacks in the fourth quarter of their 34–20 semifinal win over the defending champions, the Fundidores de Monterrey. The Caudillos went on to defeat the Dinos de Saltillo by a score of 10–0 in Tazón México VI to complete their perfect season. González earned Tazón México MVP honors, becoming the second defensive player (and second defensive lineman) to win the award.

In 2024, González led the league with eight sacks. He helped the Caudillos complete their second straight perfect season by compiling an 8–0 regular-season record and beating the Raptors de Naucalpan in Tazón México VII.

== National team career ==
González was called up to represent the Mexico national team at the 2015 IFAF World Championship. He was named the team MVP in their opening game against the United States after recording two sacks, one tackle for loss and a forced fumble in the 30–6 defeat. Mexico ultimately defeated France, 20–7, in the bronze medal game for their best finish since 2003.

Ten years later, González was named to the senior national team roster ahead of a matchup against Canada at the Estadio Wilfrido Massieu on 13 December 2025. It was a provisional Gridiron Nations Championship (GNC) exhibition as Mexico has not yet been confirmed as a GNC member for 2026.

== Personal life ==
In 2019, González was a contestant on the third season of the Exatlón Estados Unidos, a reality competition series on Telemundo. He later returned for the show's fifth season. González reached the finals on both occasions.

In December 2020, González announced his engagement to his girlfriend, model Flor Véliz.
