= 2023 Raptors de Naucalpan season =

- Head coach: Guillermo Gutiérrez
- Home stadium: Estadio José Ortega Martínez

Results
- Record: 4–6
- Playoffs: Did not qualify

The 2023 Raptors de Naucalpan season is the Raptors de Naucalpan eight season in the Liga de Fútbol Americano Profesional (LFA) and their sixth under head coach Guillermo Gutiérrez.

Raptors returned to the Estadio José Ortega Martínez after playing the 2022 season at the Estadio FES Acatlán.

Raptors opened their season losing against their rivals Dinos.

== Draft ==
2023 Raptors de Naucalpan draft
Round	Pick	Player	Position	School
1	1	Aminael Landa	OL	IPN
1	8	Héctor Rodríguez	WR	UVM
2	11	César Mandujano	DB	IPN
2	12	Saúl Zanatta	OL	FES Acatlán
3	25	Julio García	OL	UNAM
4	35	Andoni Ruiz	LB	FES Acatlán
4	38	Raúl Reyes	QB	UNAM
5	44	Carlos García	WR	IPN
6	55	Xavier García	LB	IPN
6	63	Eduardo Calderón	DL	IPN
7	69	Santiago Arnaud	OL	UVM

== Roster ==
Raptors de Naucalpan roster
Quarterbacks: 13 Bruno Márquez; 12 Julio Vázquez; Running backs: 33 Edgar Arroyo; 3 Dan Ávila; 26 Brian Correa; 4 Luis Humberto López; Wide receivers: 86 Enrique Barraza; 19 Manuel Barrios; 16 Iván García; 6 Humberto Noriega; 11 Gustavo Pecechea; 81 Jorge Retana; 10 Alexis Rodríguez; 2 Andrés Salgado; 14 Alberto Villegas; 1 Diego Yáñez	Offensive linemen: 65 Terrence Ames Jr.; 57 Iván Castro; 59 Marco Antonio Cortés; 74 Julio García; 52 Enrique González; 71 Ernesto Landa; 51 Diego Morales; 58 Julio Nava; 54 Josué Torres; 72 Saúl Zanatta; Defensive linemen: 15 Anthony Baldovinos; 91 David Casarrubias; 8 Salvador Casillas; 99 Isaac Gil; 95 Alejandro Miranda; 97 Antonio Ramírez; 69 Diego Ruiz; 90 Julio Villarreal	Linebackers: 29 Sebastián Baig; 40 Jovanni Carrillo; 25 Jordan Cry; 22 Daniel González; 36 Cristian Treviño; 44 Desmond Veals; 50 Edgar White; Defensive backs: 0 Fernando Espinoza; 24 César Mandujano FS; 18 Raúl Mateos; 21 Jean Retaud; 37 Manuel Hernández S; 30 David Rico CB; 32 DeJohn Rodgers; 7 Saúl Valencia CB; Special teams: 9 Alfredo Gachuz K/P
Italics indicate International player Roster updated 19-04-2023

== Staff ==
Raptors de Naucalpan staff
Head coach: Head coach – Guillermo Gutiérrez; Offensive coaches: Running backs – Iván Escobar; Wide receivers – Mario Martínez; Offensive line – Julio Nava	Defensive coaches: Defensive line – Enrique Soto; Defensive backs – Iván Zárate; Strength and conditioning: Strength and conditioning – Mauricio Silva

== Regular season ==
=== Standings ===
Liga de Fútbol Americano Profesional
Pos	Team	GP	W	L	PF	PA	Stk	Qualification
1	Caudillos	10	10	0	362	188	W10	Advance to Semi-finals
2	Dinos	10	7	3	285	252	L1	Advance to Semi-finals
3	Reyes	10	7	3	272	250	W2	Advance to Wild Card
4	Reds	10	6	4	260	189	L2	Advance to Wild Card
5	Fundidores	10	6	4	297	237	W3	Advance to Wild Card
6	Galgos	10	5	5	214	216	W1	Advance to Wild Card
7	Raptors	10	4	6	203	228	L3	
8	Mexicas	10	3	7	178	216	W1	
9	Gallos Negros	10	1	9	166	364	L1	
10	Jefes	10	1	9	201	295	L4	
Tiebreakers
1. Head-to-head; 2. Points against 3. Average between points scored and points against 4. Best net points in common games 5. Best net points in all games 6. Coin toss

Source: LFA

=== Schedule ===
Week	Date	Time	Opponent	Result	Record	Venue	TV	Recap
1	4 March	20:00 (UTC–6)	at Dinos	L 14–24	0–1	Estadio Francisco I. Madero	Claro Sports	Recap
2	11 March	17:00 (UTC–6)	Reyes	L 16–23	0–2	Estadio José Ortega Martínez	AYM Sports	Recap
3	19 March	13:00 (UTC–8)	at Galgos	L 13–27	0–3	Estadio Caliente	AYM Sports/Claro Sports	Recap
4	25 March	17:00 (UTC–6)	Jefes	W 33–21	1–3	Estadio José Ortega Martínez	Claro Sports	Recap
5	1 April	20:00 (UTC–6)	at Mexicas	W 15–0	2–3	Estadio Jesús Martínez "Palillo"	Claro Sports	Recap
6	16 April	12:00 (UTC–6)	Fundidores	W 21–14	3–3	Estadio José Ortega Martínez	Claro Sports	Recap
7	22 April	17:00 (UTC–6)	at Gallos Negros			Estadio Olímpico de Querétaro	TBA	Recap
8	29 April	13:00 (UTC–6)	at Reds			Estadio ITESM CCM	TBA	Recap
9	6 May	17:00 (UTC–6)	Caudillos			Estadio José Ortega Martínez	TBA	Recap
10	14 May	12:00 (UTC–6)	Mexicas			Estadio Ciudad de los Deportes	TBA	Recap
