= Shelton Eppler =

American football player (born 1998)

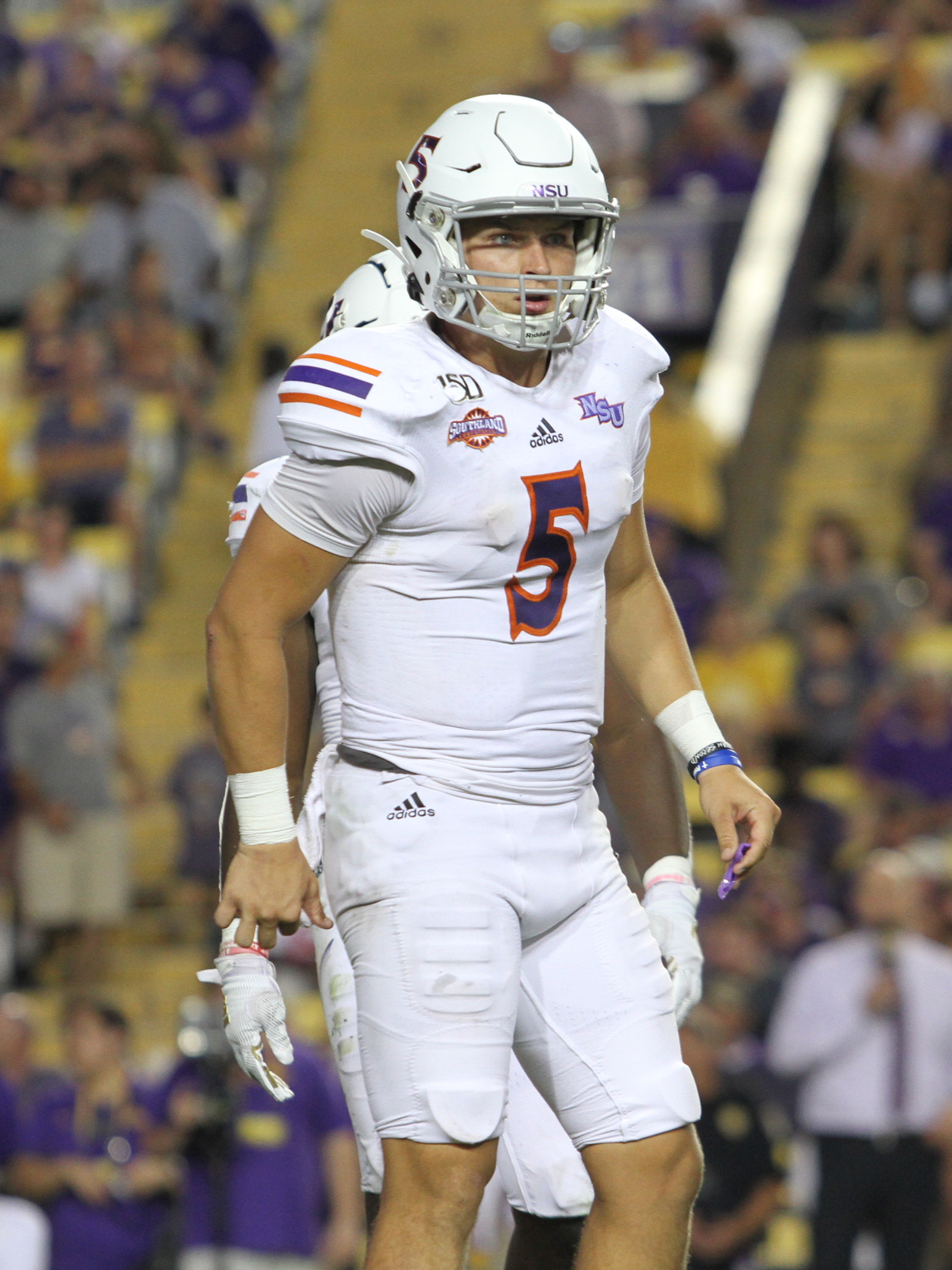
- Eppler with the Northwestern State Demons in 2019

No. 8 – Osos de Monterrey
- Position: Quarterback
- Roster status: Active

Personal information
- Born: c. 1998 (age 27–28); Navasota, Texas, U.S.
- Listed height: 6 ft 1 in (1.85 m)
- Listed weight: 205 lb (93 kg)

Career information
- High school: Navasota (TX)
- College: Trinity Valley (2016–2017); Northwestern State (2018–2019)
- NFL draft: 2020: undrafted

Career history
- Aalborg 89ers (2021); Fundidores de Monterrey (2022–2024); Vienna Vikings (2024); Osos de Monterrey (2025–present)

Awards and highlights
- Tazón México champion (V); LFA Most Valuable Player (2022); LFA Offensive Player of the Year (2023); 2× LFA All-Pro (2022, 2023); 4x LFA passing yards leader (2022, 2023, 2024, 2025); 3× LFA passing touchdowns leader (2022, 2024, 2025); LFA records: Most career passing touchdowns; Most career passing yards; Most passing touchdowns in a season: 3,004 (2023)

Shelton Eppler is an American football player who is a quarterback for the Osos de Monterrey of the Liga de Fútbol Americano Profesional (LFA).

Eppler was a three-year letter winner at Navasota High School in Navasota, Texas. As a junior, he was named the TSWA Class 4A offensive player of the year after leading Navasota to a Class 4A-I state title. As a senior, Eppler broke the Texas high school record by throwing 71 touchdown passes in a single season. He also graduated with the fourth- and fifth- best marks in state history in touchdown passes (159) and passing yards (12,245), respectively. Rated a two-star recruit, Eppler committed to Trinity Valley Community College.

Eppler lead Trinity Valley to a combined record of 20–4 in his two seasons with the team in 2016 and 2017, as well as back-to-back wins in the C.H.A.M.P.S. Heart of Texas Bowl. He transferred to Northwestern State, an NCAA Division I school. Eppler threw for 2,639 yards and 26 touchdowns in nine games as a junior, earning Southland Conference honorable mention honors. In his final season, he broke the single-season school record in passing yards (3,587) and tied the school record in passing touchdowns (28). Eppler also broke various career records, including the career passing yards mark previously held by his head coach, Brad Laird.

After going undrafted in the 2020 NFL draft, Eppler began his professional career in Denmark, taking the Aalborg 89ers to the National Ligaen playoff semifinals in 2021, before signing with the Fundidores de Monterrey in Mexico. In 2022, he earned the MVP award after leading the league in passing yards and touchdowns, and he became the first foreign quarterback to win a Tazón México.

== Early life ==
Eppler was born in Navasota, Texas, to Nancy and Joey Eppler. He attended Navasota High School, where he was a three-year letter winner on the football team. In addition, he was a four-year letterman in baseball and earned second-team all-state honors as a senior.

As a sophomore, Eppler became the starting quarterback for Navasota. He earned first-team all-district honors after leading the Rattlers to a 10–2 record and the second round of the regional playoffs. As a junior, Eppler completed 286 of 427 passes for 5,444 yards and 71 touchdowns, leading the Rattlers to a 16–0 record and a Class 4A-I state title. He threw for 453 yards and six touchdowns in the state semifinals, a 49–26 victory over Liberty Hill. In the championship game, Eppler threw for 493 yards and four touchdowns in a 42–35 double-overtime win over Argyle at AT&T Stadium. He also broke the Texas high school record for touchdown passes in a single season, surpassing Travis Quintanilla of Refugio.

Eppler earned first-team MaxPreps Junior All-American honors and was named the Class 4A offensive player of the year by the Texas Sports Writers Association. Coming into his senior season, Eppler was named to the Parade All-America Preseason Watch List. Eppler completed 232 of 364 passes for 4,110 yards and 60 touchdowns that season, leading Navasota to a 12–1 record. In the first round of the playoffs, he threw for three touchdowns, but the team was upset 55–48 by Carthage, ending their 28-game winning streak. Eppler was named the Texas Class 4A Built Ford Tough Player of the Year.

Eppler finished his career ranking fourth all-time in touchdown passes (159) and fifth all-time in passing yards (12,245) in Texas high school football history. He was rated a two-star recruit by both Rivals and 247Sports, and received just one NCAA Division I offer from South Dakota. Eppler signed with Trinity Valley Community College, a junior college in Athens, Texas.

== College career ==
=== Trinity Valley ===
As a freshman in 2016, Eppler played in seven games and threw for 690 yards with nine touchdowns and no interceptions. He helped the Cardinals to an 11–1 record and a Southwest Junior College Football Conference title, as well as a victory in the 16th annual C.H.A.M.P.S. Heart of Texas Bowl against Northwest Mississippi.

As a sophomore in 2017, Eppler threw for 1,966 yards and 19 touchdowns in seven games. Trinity Valley finished with a 9–3 record but was unable to repeat as conference champions. Eppler passed for 315 yards and four touchdowns in the season opener, a 57–3 win over Pima. In the conference semifinals, Eppler had four passing touchdowns and one rushing touchdown in a 47–34 win over Navarro. He threw only one touchdown in the conference title game; Trinity Valley was defeated 26–10 by Northeastern Oklahoma A&M. However, Eppler led his team to a 48–41 victory over Garden City in the C.H.A.M.P.S. Heart of Texas Bowl, completing 21 of 47 passes for 242 yards and three touchdowns, as well as one rushing touchdown.

In December 2017, Eppler signed with the Northwestern State Demons on the first day of the mid-year junior college transfer signing period. His head coach at Trinity Valley, Brad Smiley, had just been hired as the offensive coordinator at the school.

=== Northwestern State ===
==== 2018 season ====
Eppler entered his junior season in 2018 in a quarterback battle with Clay Holgorsen, the previous season's starter. Eppler got the start in the season opener versus Texas A&M, but Holgorsen played a majority of the snaps in the second half. Eppler completed nine out of 16 passes for 105 yards in the 59–7 loss. The following week, Eppler threw for 263 yards and four touchdowns in a 34–7 home win over Grambling State, combining with Holgorsen for a single-game school-record of 35 completions. He was named the Louisiana co-Offensive Player of the Week by the Louisiana Sports Writers Association (LSWA), sharing the honor with J'Mar Smith. Against Lamar on September 15, Eppler broke school records in touchdown passes (six) and passing yards (474) in a 49–48 win on the road. For his performance, he was named the Southland Conference Offensive Player of the Week and again earned LSWA Louisiana Offensive Player of the Week honors.

Eppler did not throw an interception until the fifth game of the season; his 143 attempts to open a season without an interception were the most in the school's history. On October 13, he passed for 351 yards and three touchdown with two interceptions in a 42–28 loss to Sam Houston State, suffering a concussion during the game. He returned to action on November 3 after missing two games, throwing for 367 yards and tying his school record with six passing touchdown in a 49–47 loss to Abilene Christian. The following week against McNeese State, Eppler threw for 292 yards and four touchdowns to lead the Demons to a 37–34 double overtime home victory in the rivalry game. In the season finale, Northwestern State faced Stephen F. Austin on the road in the Battle for Chief Caddo. Eppler threw for 295 yards and two touchdowns, along with three interceptions, in a 35–23 win. Eppler finished the season with 2,639 yards and 26 touchdowns in nine games, earning Southland Conference honorable mention honors. His 293.2 passing yards per game set a single-season school record.

==== 2019 season ====
Coming into his senior season in 2019, Eppler was named to the FCS National Performer of the Year preseason watchlist by the College Football Performance Awards. In a season-opening loss to UT Martin, he threw for 387 yards and four touchdowns, breaking the single-game school records in completions (43) and attempts (62). On September 28, in a 44–27 loss to Southeastern Louisiana, Eppler completed 35 of 55 passes for 333 yards and three touchdowns. The following week, he threw for a season-high 387 yards and four touchdowns on the road against in-state rivals Nicholls, though the Demons lost 45–35. The week after that, Eppler threw for 310 yards and three touchdowns with two interceptions, though the Demons lost again against Central Arkansas by a score of 31–30. They failed to convert a two-point conversion with 90 seconds left and their record dropped to 0–7 on the season.

On October 26, Eppler led Northwestern State to their first victory of the season, throwing a game-winning 1-yard touchdown pass to receiver Quan Shorts in overtime for a 44–41 road win over Incarnate Word. On November 9, he threw for 289 yards and tied his season-high with four touchdowns in a 34–13 win over Lamar. Eppler led the Demons to their second consecutive victory on November 16, throwing for 306 yards and two touchdowns in a 31–28 upset victory over Sam Houston State on the road. He also recorded his first rushing touchdown of the season, a five-yard run which capped a 75-yard drive and ended up being the game-winning score. Additionally, Eppler became the first Northwestern State quarterback to surpass the 3,000-yard mark in a season. He earned Southland Conference Offensive Player of the Week honors for his performance. In the season finale, Eppler threw for 333 yards and two touchdowns in a 32–20 loss to Stephen F. Austin in the Battle for Chief Caddo. Eppler finished the season with a school-record 3,587 yards and tied the school record with 28 passing touchdowns.

Eppler broke or tied the Northwestern State single-game, season and career records for completions, attempts, passing yards, and passing touchdowns. His head coach, Brad Laird, had previously held the career passing yards mark.

=== College statistics ===
| Season | Team | Passing | | | | | | | Rushing | | | |
| Season | Team | Cmp | Att | Pct | Yds | Y/A | TD | Int | Att | Yds | Avg | TD |
|---|---|---|---|---|---|---|---|---|---|---|---|---|
| 2016 | Trinity Valley | 46 | 75 | 61.3 | 690 | 9.2 | 9 | 0 | 15 | 79 | 5.3 | 0 |
| 2017 | Trinity Valley | 153 | 277 | 55.2 | 1,966 | 7.1 | 19 | 7 | 54 | 53 | 1.0 | 4 |
| 2018 | Northwestern State | 199 | 328 | 60.7 | 2,639 | 8.0 | 26 | 10 | 44 | −13 | −0.3 | 0 |
| 2019 | Northwestern State | 341 | 545 | 62.6 | 3,587 | 6.6 | 28 | 14 | 68 | 63 | 0.9 | 1 |
| Career | | 739 | 1,225 | 60.3 | 8,882 | 7.3 | 82 | 31 | 181 | 182 | 1.0 | 5 |

== Professional career ==
=== Aalborg 89ers ===
Eppler planned to attend a tryout with the Saskatchewan Roughriders of the Canadian Football League after college, but it was cancelled due to the COVID-19 pandemic. There was no Pro Day at his school, either. Instead, he created an account on Europlayers.com, an overseas recruiting website, and developed a strong relationship with a head coach in Denmark. In January 2021, Eppler signed with the Aalborg 89ers of the Danish National Ligaen, both as a quarterback and as a youth team coach. In his first game, he completed 25 of 33 passes for 222 yards and two touchdowns, along with 44 rushing yards, in a 38–13 loss to the Copenhagen Towers. Eppler completed 68 percent of his passes for 1,723 yards and 17 touchdowns in the regular season. In the playoff semifinals, he threw two touchdowns in a 45–29 defeat to the Copenhagen Towers.

=== Fundidores de Monterrey ===
==== 2022 season ====
On March 1, 2022, Eppler signed with the Fundidores de Monterrey of the Mexican Liga de Fútbol Americano Profesional (LFA) ahead of the 2022 season. He was recruited by the team's offensive coordinator, Alfredo Hernández, who was a part of the coaching staff on a team that Eppler had played against in high school. Eppler debuted in the Fundidores' season opener later that month, passing for 304 yards and one touchdown in a 24–17 overtime loss against rivals Dinos de Saltillo. The following week against the Mexicas de la Ciudad de México, he threw a touchdown to Fernando Richarte to lead his team to a 27–13 win – their first of the season. On March 25, Eppler threw a pair of touchdown passes to Tavarious Battiste in a 23–20 win over the Raptors de Naucalpan. On April 3, he threw two touchdowns to newcomer Torin Justice to lead the Fundidores to a 13–10 victory over the Gallos Negros de Querétaro. Eppler threw four touchdowns, including three to Justice, in the following week's 28–9 victory over the Galgos de Tijuana to secure a playoff berth. Eppler tossed three touchdowns, including two to Justice, in a 35–24 loss to the Reyes de Jalisco to close out the regular season. The Fundidores finished in second place with a 4–2 record, earning a first-round bye in the playoffs. Eppler finished with 1,677 yards and 15 touchdowns, both league-leading marks.

In the semifinals against the Raptors de Naucalpan, Eppler threw for three touchdowns during the 30–27 win. He completed a last-second game-winning touchdown pass to Tavarious Battiste. In the Tazón México V against the Gallos Negros de Querétaro, Eppler led his team to an 18–14 victory and the first LFA title in franchise history. He became the first non-Mexican quarterback to win a Tazón México. Eppler was later named the 2022 LFA Most Valuable Player, the first time the award was won by a non-Mexican player. He re-signed with the Fundidores in November.

==== 2023 season ====
In the 2023 LFA season opener, Eppler threw one touchdown in their 31–15 defeat to the defending Fútbol Americano de México champions, the Reds de la Ciudad de México. After leading the Fundidores to a 28–21 victory over the Jefes de Ciudad Juárez in week 2, Eppler threw for 381 yards and three touchdowns to beat the Gallos Negros de Querétaro, 34–31, in their third game. The following week, he tossed three touchdowns to lead his team to a 31–7 win over the previously undefeated Reyes de Jalisco. However, the Fundidores suffered three consecutive losses in April, bringing their record to 3–4. Eppler closed out the month by throwing three touchdowns in a 24–8 win over the Mexicas de la Ciudad de México. The following week, he threw three touchdowns and rushed for another in a 40–13 win over the Galgos de Tijuana. In the regular season finale, Eppler passed for four touchdowns in a 55–34 win over the Dinos de Saltillo, securing a playoff spot for Monterrey with a 6–4 record. On the season, he completed 242 of 352 passes for 3,004 yards and 25 touchdowns to 11 interceptions, and recorded 22 carries for 138 yards and one touchdown on the ground. Aside from leading the league in passing yards, Eppler became the first player in LFA history to throw for 3,000 yards in a single season.

In the wild card round, Eppler threw two touchdowns in a 17–10 win over the Reds de la Ciudad de México. However, the Fundidores were then eliminated in the semifinals by the undefeated Caudillos de Chihuahua, as Eppler passed for two touchdowns and rushed for another in a 34–20 defeat to the league newcomers. He was later honored as an All-Pro and the LFA Offensive Player of the Year.

==== 2024 season ====
Eppler made his 2024 season debut in Monterrey's opener against the Jefes de Ciudad Juárez. After throwing a pick-six on the first offensive play of the game, he went on to pass for five touchdowns in the first half, setting the league record, and finished with over 400 yards in a 47–6 blowout win.

In 2024, Eppler completed 193 of 252 passes for 2,480 yards and 31 touchdowns to 10 interceptions. He also recorded 22 carries for 86 yards and two touchdowns.

=== Vienna Vikings ===
On June 14, 2024, Eppler signed with the Vienna Vikings of the European League of Football (ELF) as a replacement for the injured Ben Holmes. He made his team debut a few days later, throwing for 308 yards and three touchdowns in a 25–20 comeback win over the Berlin Thunder. The following week, Eppler passed for 426 yards and four touchdowns in a 42–3 win thumping of the Prague Lions. Holmes subsequently recovered and Eppler was released in early July.

=== Osos de Monterrey ===
Ahead of the 2025 LFA season, the Fundidores were acquired by an investor group led by ex-NBA player Blake Griffin and ex-NFL player Ryan Kalil, who rebranded the team as the Osos de Monterrey and retained Eppler at quarterback.

He threw for 2,089 yards and 20 touchdowns, both league-leading marks.

== Personal life ==
After graduating from Northwestern State with honors, Eppler became a licensed insurance agent and sold insurance while playing in Denmark and Mexico. He married former Northwestern State volleyball player Skylar Besch in early 2022.

His brother, Tyler, is a professional baseball pitcher who has played in Nippon Professional Baseball, the KBO League and the Chinese Professional Baseball League.
