= 2024 LFA season =

- Duration: 1 March – 11 May

Tazón México VII
- Date: 8 June
- Venue: Estadio Corregidora, Querétaro City
- Champions: Caudillos de Chihuahua (2nd title)

Seasons
- 2023 2025

The 2024 LFA season was the ninth season of operation (eighth season of play) of the Liga de Fútbol Americano Profesional (LFA), the top American football league in Mexico. The regular season began on 1 March and ended on 6 June with the Caudillos de Chihuahua defeating the Raptors de Naucalpanin the Tazón México VII in Querétaro City for their second consecutive league championship.

== Preseason events ==
=== Draft ===
The LFA draft was held on January 13. There were a total of 108 picks, with the Jefes selecting Alonso Gaxiola from Borregos Monterrey with the first overall pick.

=== Team changes ===
The Reds sat out the 2024 season after the LFA took over the team's operations following the conclusion of the previous season. A dispersal draft was held on 29 January that resulted in 32 players moving to 8 of the remaining 9 teams, as the Gallos Negros did not participate in the draft.

== Teams ==
=== Stadiums, locations and personnel ===
Team	Location	Stadium	Capacity	Head coach
Caudillos	Chihuahua City, Chihuahua	Estadio Olímpico de la UACH	22,000	(Mexico) Federico Landeros
Dinos	Saltillo, Coahuila	Estadio Francisco I. Madero	16,000	(Mexico) Javier Adame
Fundidores	Monterrey, Nuevo León	Estadio Banorte	10,057	(Mexico) Jorge Váldez
Galgos	Tijuana, Baja California	Estadio Caliente	27,333	(Mexico) Mauricio Loyola
Gallos Negros	Querétaro City, Querétaro	Estadio Olímpico de Querétaro	4,600	(Mexico) Carlos Strevel
Jefes	Ciudad Juárez, Chihuahua	Estadio 20 de Noviembre	5,000	(Mexico) Eduardo Araujo
Mexicas	Iztacalco, Mexico City	Estadio Jesús Martínez "Palillo"	6,000	(Mexico) Félix Buendía
Raptors	Naucalpan, State of Mexico	Estadio FES Acatlán	3,000	(Mexico) Horacio García
Reyes	Guadalajara, Jalisco	Estadio Reyes Comude	1,500	(Mexico) Carlos Rosado

Locations of the 2024 LFA teams
Greater Mexico City LFA teams

=== Coaching changes ===
Pre-season
Team	Departing Coach	New Coach	Reference
Jefes	José Ángel Reyes (interim)	Eduardo Araujo	
Raptors	Guillermo Gutiérrez	Horacio García	
Reyes	Ernesto Alfaro	Carlos Rosado	

== Regular season ==
=== Standings ===
Note: GP = Games played, W = Wins, L = Losses, PF = Points For, PA = Points against

Liga de Fútbol Americano Profesional
Pos	Team	GP	W	L	PF	PA	Stk	Qualification
1	Caudillos	8	8	0	252	114	W8	Advance to Semi-finals
2	Mexicas	8	5	3	234	174	L1	Advance to Semi-finals
3	Raptors	8	5	3	181	175	W2	Advance to Wild Card
4	Dinos	8	4	4	139	171	W2	Advance to Wild Card
5	Fundidores	8	4	4	269	207	L4	Advance to Wild Card
6	Jefes	8	3	5	140	170	W2	Advance to Wild Card
7	Gallos Negros	8	3	5	126	180	L1	
8	Galgos	8	3	5	137	197	W2	
9	Reyes	8	1	7	139	229	L6	
Tiebreakers
1. Head-to-head; 2. Points against 3. Average between points scored and points against 4. Best net points in common games 5. Best net points in all games 6. Coin toss

Source: LFA

=== Schedule ===
- Times shown in Mexico Central Standard time (UTC–6).

Week 1
Away	Score	Home	Venue	Date	Time
Reyes	24–27	Gallos Negros	Estadio Olímpico de Querétaro	1 March	19:00
Mexicas	35–6	Galgos	Estadio Caliente	1 March	21:00
Dinos	17–31	Raptors	Estadio FES Acatlán	2 March	19:00
Jefes	12–28	Caudillos	Estadio Olímpico de la UACH	2 March	14:00

Week 2
Away	Score	Home	Venue	Date	Time
Caudillos	10–3	Galgos	Estadio Caliente	8 March	21:00
Gallos Negros	14–36	Mexicas	Estadio Jesús Martínez "Palillo"	9 March	15:00
Raptors	17–33	Reyes	Estadio Reyes Comude	10 March	12:00
Jefes	6–47	Fundidores	Estadio Banorte	11 March	20:00

Week 3
Away	Score	Home	Venue	Date	Time
Galgos	6–14	Raptors	Estadio FES Acatlán	16 March	16:00
Reyes	20–34	Mexicas	Campo Redskins	16 March	19:00
Fundidores	28–7	Gallos Negros	Estadio Olímpico de Querétaro	16 March	19:00
Dinos	7–6	Jefes	Estadio 20 de Noviembre	17 March	14:00

Week 4
Away	Score	Home	Venue	Date	Time
Mexicas	13–34	Caudillos	Estadio Olímpico de la UACH	23 March	19:00
Gallos Negros	21–6	Dinos	Estadio Francisco I. Madero	23 March	20:00
Fundidores	35–23	Reyes	Estadio Reyes Comude	24 March	12:00
Raptors	24–17	Jefes	Estadio 20 de Noviembre	11 May	14:00

Week 5
Away	Score	Home	Venue	Date	Time
Fundidores	20–41	Dinos	Estadio Francisco I. Madero	4 April	20:00
Mexicas	29–21	Raptors	Estadio FES Acatlán	6 April	16:00
Galgos	16–20	Gallos Negros	Estadio Olímpico de Querétaro	6 April	19:00
Caudillos	49–17	Reyes	Estadio Reyes Comude	7 April	12:00

Week 6
Away	Score	Home	Venue	Date	Time
Galgos	26–22	Reyes	Estadio Reyes Comude	11 April	20:00
Jefes	23–19	Mexicas	Estadio Jesús Martínez "Palillo"	13 April	15:00
Raptors	36–31	Fundidores	Estadio Banorte	13 April	17:00
Caudillos	39–8	Dinos	Estadio Francisco I. Madero	15 April	20:00

Week 7
Away	Score	Home	Venue	Date	Time
Gallos Negros	14–25	Raptors	Estadio FES Acatlán	20 April	16:00
Fundidores	34–36	Caudillos	Estadio Olímpico de la UACH	20 April	19:00
Reyes	0–28	Jefes	Estadio 20 de Noviembre	21 April	14:00
Dinos	20–30	Galgos	Estadio Caliente	22 April	21:00

Week 8
Away	Score	Home	Venue	Date	Time
Mexicas	44–29	Fundidores	Estadio Banorte	27 April	17:00
Caudillos	28–14	Gallos Negros	Estadio Olímpico de Querétaro	27 April	19:00
Reyes	0–13	Dinos	Estadio Francisco I. Madero	27 April	20:00
Jefes	31–36	Galgos	Estadio Caliente	27 April	21:00

Week 9
Away	Score	Home	Venue	Date	Time
Dinos	27–24	Mexicas	Estadio Jesús Martínez "Palillo"	4 May	15:00
Galgos	14–45	Fundidores	Estadio Banorte	4 May	17:00
Raptors	13–28	Caudillos	Estadio Olímpico de la UACH	4 May	19:00
Gallos Negros	9–17	Jefes	Estadio 20 de Noviembre	5 May	14:00

== Playoffs ==
=== Playoff bracket ===
Wild Card
4	Dinos	17
5	Fundidores	26
3	Raptors	30
6	Jefes	26

Semifinals
1	Caudillos	20
5	Fundidores	12
2	Mexicas	17
3	Raptors	24

Tazón México VII
1	Caudillos	34
3	Raptors	14

== Tazón México VII ==
Tazón México VII

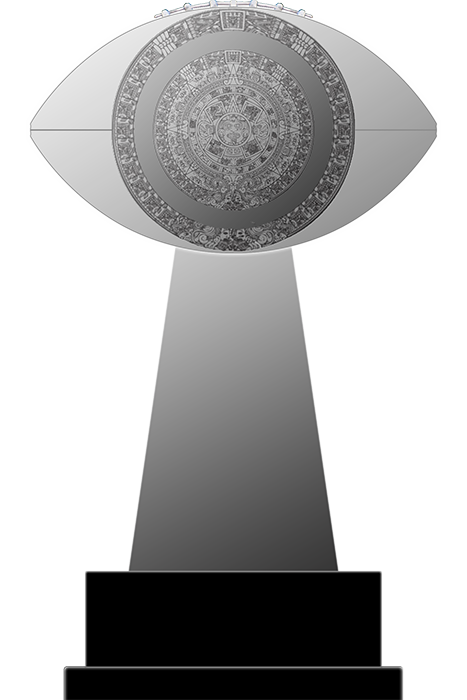

Raptors
vs
Caudillos
(5–3)

(8–0)
14

34
Head Coach:

Head Coach:
Horacio García

Federico Landeros

Teams	1	2	3	4
Raptors	0	0	7	7
Caudillos	7	7	13	7

Date: 8 June 2024
Kickoff Time: 7 p.m.
Stadium: Estadio Corregidora
Attendance: 10,000
MVP: Jeremy Johnson, QB
Favorite:
Referee:
TV:
Announcers: Pablo Viruega (play-by-play), Gabriel Pacheco (analyst), Carlos Rosado (analyst)

The Tazón México VII was held on 8 June at the Estadio Corregidora in Querétaro City.

== Awards ==
=== Players of the week ===
The following were named the top performers during the 2024 season:

Week	Offensive Player of the Week			Defensive Player of the Week		
Week	Player	Pos.	Team	Player	Pos.	Team
1	Jeremy Johnson	QB	Caudillos	Kenneth Bradley	LB	Caudillos
2	Shelton Eppler	QB	Fundidores	Kenneth Bradley (2)	LB	Caudillos
3	Timothy Whitfield	RB	Mexicas	Jadarius Ceasar	DE	Dinos
4	Shelton Eppler (2)	QB	Fundidores	Joshua Reed	LB	Fundidores
5	Erick Niño	QB	Dinos	Sergio Schiaffino	DB	Dinos
6	Kevin Correa	RB	Raptors	Leondre Crosby	LB	Caudillos
7						
8						
9						

== Statistical leaders ==
2024 LFA statistical leaders
Category		Player	Team	Stat
Offense
Passing	Yards	Shelton Eppler	Fundidores	1,596
Passing	Touchdowns	Shelton Eppler	Fundidores	19
Passing	Interceptions	Trevone Boykin	Galgos	8
Rushing	Yards	Timothy Whitfield	Mexicas	535
Rushing	Touchdowns	Timothy Whitfield	Mexicas	6
Receiving	Yards	Tristen Wallace	Fundidores	414
Receiving	Receptions	Malik Stanley	Caudillos	32
Receiving	Touchdowns	Tied 2		6
Defense
Tackles		Kenneth Bradley	Caudillos	39
Sacks		Leondre Crosby	Caudillos	5.0
Interceptions		Tied 2		3
Special teams
Return yards	Kick	De'John Rogers	Raptors	272
Return yards	Punt	Luis González	Raptors	84
Field goals made		Gabriel Pérez	Dinos	7
