= 2023 LFA season =

- Duration: 4 March – 14 May

Tazón México VI
- Date: 10 June
- Venue: Estadio Olímpico de la UACH, Chihuahua City
- Champions: Caudillos de Chihuahua (1st title)

Seasons
- 2022 2024

The 2023 LFA season is the eighth season of operation (seventh season of play) of the Liga de Fútbol Americano Profesional (LFA), the top American football league in Mexico. The regular season began on 4 March and ended on 14 May, with the playoffs beginning on 20 May and ending with the Tazón México VI, on 10 June in Chihuahua City.

== Preseason events ==
=== Expansion ===
Three new teams joined the league for the 2023 season: Caudillos de Chihuahua (based in Chihuahua City), Jefes de Ciudad Juárez (based in Ciudad Juárez) and Reds de la Ciudad de México (based in Mexico City). The three teams were part of Fútbol Americano de México, but after the league folded in September 2022, they joined the LFA.

=== Stadium changes ===
- Raptors will play in the Estadio José Ortega Martínez after playing in the FES Acatlán during 2022.
- Reds will play in the Estadio ITESM CCM, after initially announcing that they would be playing at the Estadio Jesús Martínez "Palillo", already used by Mexicas.
- Reyes will play in the Fortaleza Azul, with capacity for 5,000 seated spectators, after playing in the Estadio Tres de Marzo during 2022.

== Coaching changes ==
=== Off-season ===
- Galgos: Héctor del Águila replaced Guillermo Ruiz Burguete as the team's head coach.
- Gallos Negros: Rubén Contreras replaced Félix Buendía as the Gallos' head coach.

=== In-season ===
- Jefes: Randall Mendoza replaced Lorenzo Gathers as the Jefes' head coach.
- Fundidores: On 10 April, Jorge Valdez replaced Carlos Strevel and Carlos Mendoza as the Fundidores' head coach and defensive coordinator.
- Gallos Negros: On 15 April, Juan Carlos Maya replaced Rubén Contreras as the Gallos' head coach.

== Teams ==
Team	Location	Stadium	Capacity	Head coach
Caudillos	Chihuahua City, Chihuahua	Estadio Olímpico de la UACH	22,000	(Mexico) Federico Landeros
Dinos	Saltillo, Coahuila	Estadio Francisco I. Madero	16,000	(Mexico) Javier Adame
Fundidores	Monterrey, Nuevo León	Estadio Banorte	10,057	(Mexico) Carlos Strevel
Galgos	Tijuana, Baja California	Estadio Caliente	27,333	(Mexico) Héctor del Águila
Gallos Negros	Querétaro City, Querétaro	Estadio Olímpico de Querétaro	4,600	(Mexico) Rubén Contreras
Jefes	Ciudad Juárez, Chihuahua	Estadio 20 de Noviembre	5,000	(Mexico) Randall Mendoza
Mexicas	Iztacalco, Mexico City	Estadio Jesús Martínez "Palillo"	6,000	(Mexico) Héctor Toxqui
Raptors	Naucalpan, State of Mexico	Estadio José Ortega Martínez	3,700	(Mexico) Guillermo Gutiérrez
Reds	Tlalpan, Mexico City	Estadio ITESM CCM	2,500	(Mexico) Raúl Rivera
Reyes	Zapopan, Jalisco	Fortaleza Azul	5,000	(Mexico) Ernesto Alfaro

Locations of the 2023 LFA teams
Greater Mexico City LFA teams

== Regular season ==
=== Standings ===
Note: GP = Games played, W = Wins, L = Losses, PF = Points For, PA = Points against

Liga de Fútbol Americano Profesional
Pos	Team	GP	W	L	PF	PA	Stk	Qualification
1	Caudillos	10	10	0	362	188	W10	Advance to Semi-finals
2	Dinos	10	7	3	285	252	L1	Advance to Semi-finals
3	Reyes	10	7	3	272	250	W2	Advance to Wild Card
4	Reds	10	6	4	260	189	L2	Advance to Wild Card
5	Fundidores	10	6	4	297	237	W3	Advance to Wild Card
6	Galgos	10	5	5	214	216	W1	Advance to Wild Card
7	Raptors	10	4	6	203	228	L3	
8	Mexicas	10	3	7	178	216	W1	
9	Gallos Negros	10	1	9	166	364	L1	
10	Jefes	10	1	9	201	295	L4	
Tiebreakers
1. Head-to-head; 2. Points against 3. Average between points scored and points against 4. Best net points in common games 5. Best net points in all games 6. Coin toss

Source: LFA

=== Schedule ===
- Times shown in Mexico Central Standard time (UTC–6).

Week 1
Away	Score	Home	Venue	Date	Time	TV
Gallos Negros	14–42	Reyes	Fortaleza Azul	4 March	17:00	Claro Sports
Raptors	14–24	Dinos	Estadio Francisco I. Madero	4 March	20:00	Claro Sports
Galgos	24–6	Mexicas	Estadio Jesús Martínez "Palillo"	5 March	12:00	Claro Sports
Caudillos	20–12	Jefes	Estadio 20 de Noviembre	5 March	14:00	Claro Sports
Reds	31–15	Fundidores	Estadio Banorte	5 March	18:00	Claro Sports

Week 2
Away	Score	Home	Venue	Date	Time	TV
Dinos	7–32	Reds	Estadio ITESM CCM	11 March	13:00	TVC Deportes
Reyes	23–16	Raptors	Estadio José Ortega Martínez	11 March	17:00	AYM Sports
Mexicas	17–14	Gallos Negros	Estadio Olímpico de Querétaro	11 March	17:00	Claro Sports/AYM Sports
Galgos	16–51	Caudillos	Estadio Olímpico de la UACH	11 March	19:00	AYM Sports
Fundidores	28–21	Jefes	Estadio 20 de Noviembre	12 March	14:00	Claro Sports

Week 3
Away	Score	Home	Venue	Date	Time	TV
Mexicas	13–17	Reyes	Fortaleza Azul	18 March	17:00	TVC Deportes/Claro Sports
Reds	7–25	Caudillos	Estadio Olímpico de la UACH	18 March	19:00	Claro Sports
Jefes	22–26	Dinos	Estadio Francisco I. Madero	18 March	20:00	AYM Sports
Raptors	13–27	Galgos	Estadio Caliente	19 March	13:00	AYM Sports/Claro Sports
Gallos Negros	31–34	Fundidores	Estadio Banorte	19 March	18:00	Claro Sports

Week 4
Away	Score	Home	Venue	Date	Time	TV
Galgos	25–36	Reds	Estadio ITESM CCM	25 March	13:00	
Jefes	22–31	Raptors	Estadio José Ortega Martínez	25 March	17:00	Claro Sports
Caudillos	42–34	Mexicas	Estadio MCA Jaime Labastida	25 March	20:00	Claro Sports
Dinos	33–7	Gallos Negros	Estadio Olímpico de Querétaro	26 March	17:00	Claro Sports
Reyes	7–31	Fundidores	Estadio Banorte	26 March	17:00	Claro Sports

Week 5
Away	Score	Home	Venue	Date	Time	TV
Caudillos	48–14	Reyes	Fortaleza Azul	1 April	17:00	Claro Sports
Raptors	15–0	Mexicas	Estadio Jesús Martínez "Palillo"	1 April	17:00	Claro Sports
Reds	36–21	Jefes	Estadio 20 de Noviembre	2 April	14:00	Claro Sports
Gallos Negros	13–47	Galgos	Estadio Caliente	2 April	18:00	Claro Sports
Fundidores	31–38	Dinos	Estadio Francisco I. Madero	3 April	19:00	Claro Sports

Week 6
Away	Score	Home	Venue	Date	Time	TV
Reyes	14–8	Galgos	Estadio Caliente	14 April	20:00	Claro Sports
Gallos Negros	3–34	Reds	Estadio ITESM CCM	15 April	13:00	
Dinos	19–29	Caudillos	Estadio Olímpico de la UACH	15 April	19:00	Claro Sports
Fundidores	14–21	Raptors	Estadio José Ortega Martínez	16 April	12:00	Claro Sports
Mexicas	27–33	Jefes	Estadio 20 de Noviembre	16 April	14:00	Claro Sports

Week 7
Away	Score	Home	Venue	Date	Time	TV
Reds	3–18	Mexicas	Estadio Jesús Martínez "Palillo"	22 April	13:00	Claro Sports
Jefes	28–35	Reyes	Fortaleza Azul	22 April	17:00	Claro Sports
Raptors	35–12	Gallos Negros	Estadio Olímpico de Querétaro	22 April	17:00	Claro Sports
Galgos	10–33	Dinos	Estadio Francisco I. Madero	22 April	20:00	Claro Sports
Caudillos	33–25	Fundidores	Estadio Banorte	23 April	17:00	Claro Sports

Week 8
Away	Score	Home	Venue	Date	Time	TV
Raptors	16–33	Reds	Estadio ITESM CCM	29 April	13:00	
Fundidores	24–8	Mexicas	Estadio Jesús Martínez "Palillo"	29 April	15:00	Claro Sports
Dinos	33–31	Reyes	Fortaleza Azul	29 April	17:00	Claro Sports
Gallos Negros	13–47	Caudillos	Estadio Olímpico de la UACH	29 April	19:00	Claro Sports
Galgos	27–0	Jefes	Estadio 20 de Noviembre	30 April	14:00	Claro Sports

Week 9
Away	Score	Home	Venue	Date	Time	TV
Fundidores	40–13	Galgos	Estadio Caliente	5 May	20:00	Claro Sports
Reyes	42–37	Reds	Estadio ITESM CCM	6 May	13:00	
Caudillos	39–36	Raptors	Estadio José Ortega Martínez	6 May	17:00	Claro Sports
Jefes	30–37	Gallos Negros	Estadio Olímpico de Querétaro	6 May	17:00	Claro Sports
Mexicas	21–38	Dinos	Estadio Francisco I. Madero	6 May	20:00	Claro Sports

Week 10
Away	Score	Home	Venue	Date	Time	TV
Dinos	34–55	Fundidores	Estadio Banorte	11 May	20:00	Claro Sports
Jefes	12–28	Caudillos	Estadio Olímpico de la UACH	13 May	19:00	TBD
Reds	10–17	Galgos	Estadio Francisco I. Madero	13 May	20:00	Claro Sports
Mexicas	34–6	Raptors	Estadio José Ortega Martínez	14 May	12:00	Claro Sports
Reyes	47–22	Gallos Negros	Estadio Olímpico de Querétaro	14 May	15:00	Claro Sports

== Playoffs ==
=== Playoff bracket ===
Wild Card
4	Reds	10
5	Fundidores	17
3	Reyes	15
6	Galgos	3

Semifinals
1	Caudillos	34
5	Fundidores	20
2	Dinos	17
3	Reyes	10

Tazón México VI
1	Caudillos	10
2	Dinos	0

=== Results ===
Wild Card
Away	Score	Home	Venue	Date	Time	TV
Galgos	3–15	Reyes	Estadio Tres de Marzo	May 20	17:30	Claro Sports
Fundidores	17–10	Reds	Estadio ITESM CCM	May 21	13:00	Claro Sports

Semifinals
Away	Score	Home	Venue	Date	Time	TV
Fundidores	20–34	Caudillos	Estadio Olímpico Universitario de la UACH	May 27	TBD	Claro Sports
Reyes	10–17	Dinos	Estadio Francisco I. Madero	May 26	TBD	Claro Sports

Tazón México VI
Away	Score	Home	Venue	Date	Time	TV
Caudillos	10–0	Dinos	Estadio Olímpico Universitario de la UACH	June 10	TBD	Claro Sports

== Tazón México VI ==
Tazón México VI

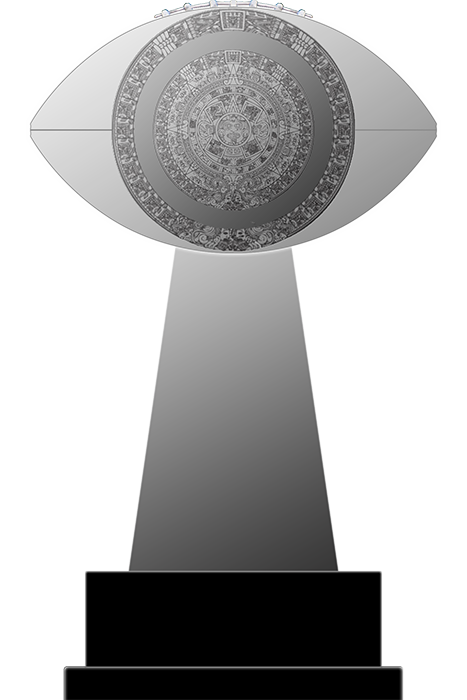

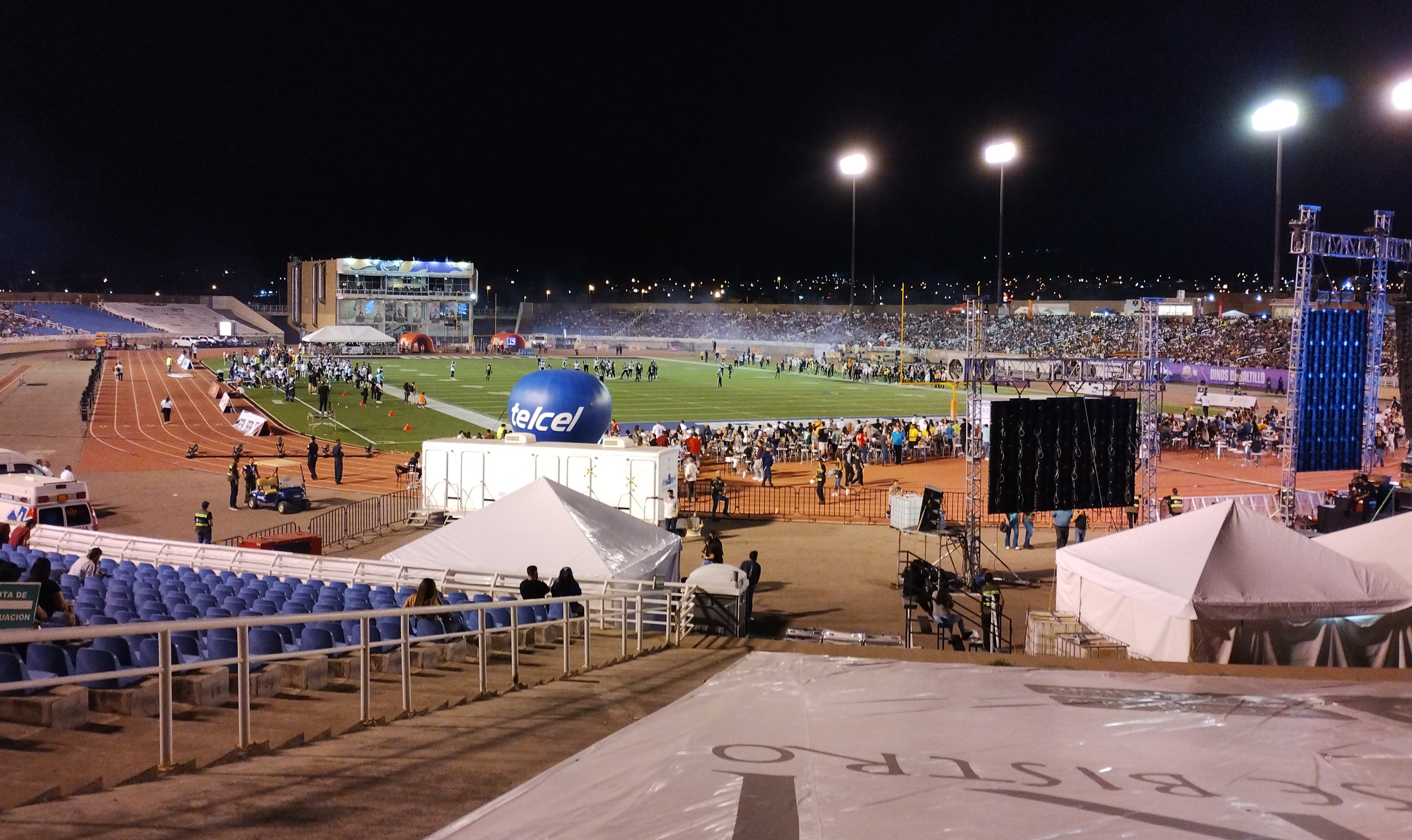

Caudillos
vs
Dinos
(10–0)

(7–3)
10

0
Head Coach:

Head Coach:
Federico Landeros

Javier Adame

Teams	1C	2C	3C	4C
Caudillos	0	0	7	3
Dinos	0	0	0	0

Date: 10 June 2023
Kickoff time: 7 p.m.
Stadium: Estadio Olímpico Universitario José Reyes Baeza
Spectators: 18,930
MVP: Octavio González, DE
Referee: Olaf Salmorán
TV:
← V • Tazón México • VII →

The Tazón México VI was held on 10 June 2023 at the Estadio Olímpico Universitario José Reyes Baeza in Chihuahua City. The Caudillos became LFA champions, after beating the Dinos by a score of 10–0.

== Awards ==
=== Players of the week ===
The following were named the top performers during the 2023 season:

Week	MVP of the Week	Offensive Player of the Week	Defensive Player of the Week
1	Tavares Martin Jr. WR (Reyes)	Eldridge Massington WR (Galgos)	Javier Dyer DE (Caudillos)
2	Jeremy Johnson QB (Caudillos)	Marco Durán QB (Reds)	Anthony Patrick LB (Reyes)
3	Aaron McCallister RB (Fundidores)	Erick Niño QB (Dinos)	David Richardson DB (Galgos)
4	Brandon López QB (Mexicas)	Denzel Strong RB (Reds)	Jorge Revuelto DB (Caudillos)
5	Juwan Manigo WR (Caudillos)	Jeremy Johnson QB (Caudillos)	Jordan Cry LB (Raptors)
6	David Perkins QB (Jefes)	Eduardo Retana WR (Raptors)	Leondre Crosby LB (Caudillos)
7	Bruno Márquez QB (Raptors)	Juwan Manigo WR (Caudillos)	Joshua Donaldson DB (Caudillos)
8	Shannon Patrick QB (Reyes)	Devin Heckstall WR (Reyes)	Emilio Castillón LB (Fundidores)
9	Juwan Manigo WR (Caudillos)	Shannon Patrick QB (Reyes)	Salvador Cabrera DB (Reyes)
10	Aaron McCallister RB (Fundidores)	Shelton Eppler QB (Fundidores)	Shuan Funnye DL (Reyes)
