= Eduardo Castañeda =

Mexico gridiron football player (born 1983)

No. 52, 43
- Position: Linebacker

Personal information
- Born: 19 January 1983 (age 43); Ciudad Acuña, Coahuila, Mexico
- Listed height: 6 ft 3 in (1.91 m)
- Listed weight: 253 lb (115 kg)

Career information
- College: ITESM Monterrey (2003–2006)
- NFL draft: 2007: undrafted

Career history
- Rhein Fire (2007); Houston Texans (2007)*; Arizona Cardinals (2008)*; Green Bay Blizzard (2011); Dinos de Saltillo (2017)*; Parrilleros de Monterrey (2022)
- * Offseason or practice squad member only

Awards and highlights
- 3× ONEFA champion (2004–2006)

Eduardo Jesús Castañeda Menchaca (born 19 January 1983) is a Mexican former gridiron football linebacker.

Castañeda played college football for the Borregos Salvajes Monterrey, leading the team to three consecutive ONEFA national championships from 2004 to 2006. He began his professional career in 2007, playing one season in NFL Europe with the Rhein Fire before spending time on the practice squads of the Houston Texans and the Arizona Cardinals in 2007 and 2008, respectively. Castañeda also played in the Indoor Football League with the Green Bay Blizzard in 2011, as well as subsequent comebacks with the Dinos de Saltillo and the Parrilleros de Monterrey in Mexico.

== Early life ==
Castañeda was born on 19 January 1983 in the border city of Acuña, Coahuila, Mexico. He began playing American football at the age of 10 with Club Vaqueros de Ciudad Acuña, winning several championships as one of the most competitive teams in AFAINC. Castañeda later returned to the Vaqueros organization as a coach in 2020.

== College career ==
Castañeda attended the Monterrey Institute of Technology and Higher Education (ITESM), where he played college football for the Borregos Salvajes Monterrey in ONEFA from 2003 to 2006 under legendary coach Frank González. He began his college career at the safety position but was converted to a linebacker. Castañeda helped lead the team to three consecutive ONEFA national championships from 2004 to 2006. He was also selected to represent Team Mexico in the Aztec Bowl in 2005 and 2006.

Castañeda credited the Monterrey coaches with teaching him the English terminology that he would later use during his pro career. He graduated with a Licentiate degree in international trade.

== Professional career ==
=== Rhein Fire ===
Castañeda decided to forego his final year of college eligibility, signing with NFL Europe team Rhein Fire in 2007 as an international prospect. In his first game as a pro, he logged three tackles against the Berlin Thunder. He played in 10 games in his lone season with the Fire, recording 10 tackles on defense and five on special teams.

=== Houston Texans ===
In July 2007, Castañeda was assigned to the Houston Texans practice squad as part of the NFL International Development Practice Squad Program. As a participant in the program, his spot was guaranteed throughout the regular season and did not count against the eight-player practice squad limit.

In the 2008 offseason, Castañeda focused on improving his speed and his footwork to better adjust to NFL gameplay.

=== Arizona Cardinals ===
In his second year in the International Development Practice Squad Program, Castañeda joined the Arizona Cardinals practice squad for the 2008 season. His former college teammate, Rolando Cantú, had previously become the first player from a Mexican university to play an NFL regular-season game when he appeared for the Cardinals in 2005.

The Cardinals reached Super Bowl XLIII that year, with Castañeda traveling to Tampa, Florida to support his teammates. The team lost to the Pittsburgh Steelers 27–23. However, Castañeda was heavily sought after by the Latino media on Media Day, with his teammates teasing that he was more famous than Kurt Warner. He also received a National Football Conference championship ring in the offseason.

Castañeda continued training for the 2009 season, though he was not offered a contract. He was reported to have signed a free agent deal with the Cleveland Browns in July 2010. However, he did not join the team for preseason.

=== Comebacks ===
Castañeda played with the Green Bay Blizzard of the Indoor Football League in 2011.

Castañeda was selected by the Dinos de Saltillo of the Liga de Fútbol Americano Profesional (LFA) in the fifth round of the 2017 LFA draft. He practiced with the team but left before appearing in a game for personal reasons.

Castañeda returned again in 2022 with the Parrilleros de Monterrey, an expansion team in the Fútbol Americano de México league. He helped the team to a 28–9 win over the Caudillos de Chihuahua in the season opener for their historic first victory.
