= Gabriel Amavizca =

Mexican gridiron football player (born 1993)

Gabriel Amavizca Ortiz
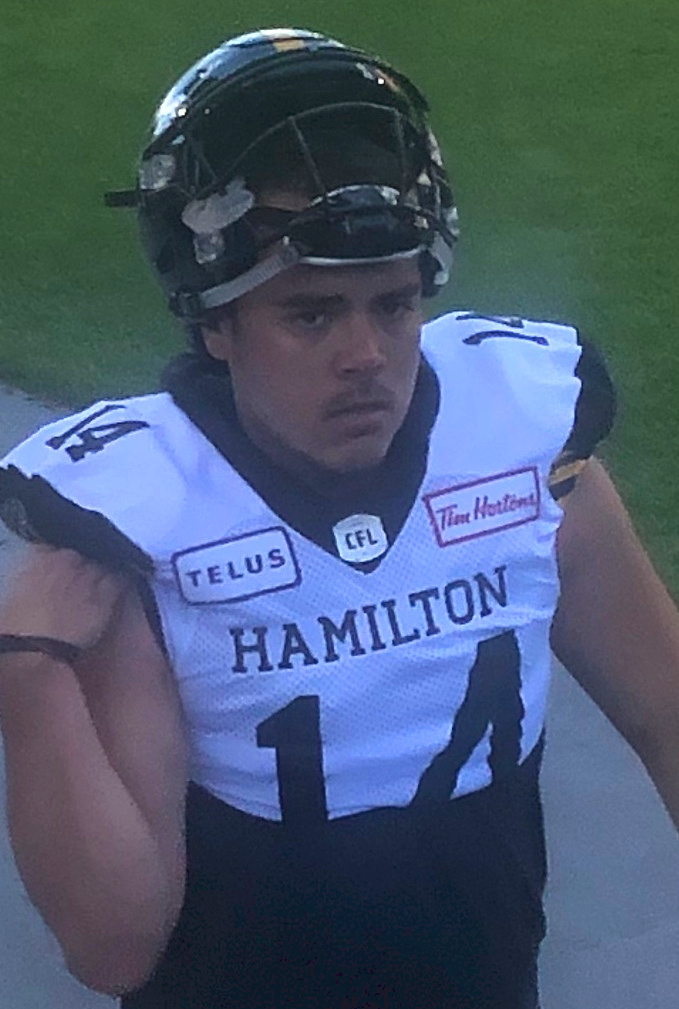

Caudillos de Chihuahua
- Position: Placekicker

Personal information
- Born: January 11, 1993 (age 33); Hermosillo, Sonora, Mexico
- Listed height: 6 ft 0 in (1.83 m)
- Listed weight: 191 lb (87 kg)

Career information
- College: UDLAP; BUAP
- CFL draft: 2019 LFA: 3rd round, 26th overall pick

Career history
- Artilleros de Puebla (2019); Winnipeg Blue Bombers (2019)*; Hamilton Tiger-Cats (2019); Reyes de Jalisco (2022); Mexicas de la Ciudad de México (2023–2024); Caudillos de Chihuahua (2025)
- * Offseason or practice squad member only
- Stats at CFL.ca

Gabriel Amavizca Ortiz (born January 11, 1993) is a Mexican professional gridiron football placekicker for the Caudillos de Chihuahua of the Liga de Fútbol Americano Profesional (LFA). He played college football at UDLAP, Universidad Madero and BUAP.

In June 2019, Amavizca became the first CFL global player ever to score points in a regular season match.

== Early life ==
Amavizca was born in Hermosillo, Sonora, but moved to Puebla when he was eight years old. He started playing gridiron football at the age of 11, after practicing other sports such as baseball, tennis and association football. In high school, he received a scholarship to play football at the ITESM Puebla.

== College career ==
Amavizca first enrolled in the UDLAP's college football program, the Aztecas, where he played for the 2013 season and won the CONADEIP championship. In 2014, he played for the Universidad Madero Tigres Blancos (White Tigers). After retiring for one season due to personal motives, he came back and played his last two college years for the BUAP, where he also earned a major in Business Administration.

== Professional career ==
Amavizca played for the Artilleros de Puebla of the Liga de Fútbol Americano Profesional for the 2019 season He became the first Artilleros player to score points.

He was selected by the Winnipeg Blue Bombers at the 2019 CFL-LFA Draft as the team's third pick (26th overall). Amavizca attended the training camp with the Blue Bombers, but was released by the team on June 8, 2019 during the pre-season. Three days later, on June 11, he was signed by the Hamilton Tiger-Cats.

On June 22, 2019, Amavizca became the first global player to score points in a CFL regular season game kicking two converts during his team's 64–14 win over the Toronto Argonauts. He dressed in the first seven games of the season before being placed on the team's practice roster. He ended the 2019 season on the practice roster and was released at the end of the year.

In December 2021, Amavizca signed with the Reyes de Jalisco ahead of the 2022 LFA season.
