= Jeremy Johnson (American football) =

American football player (born 1994)

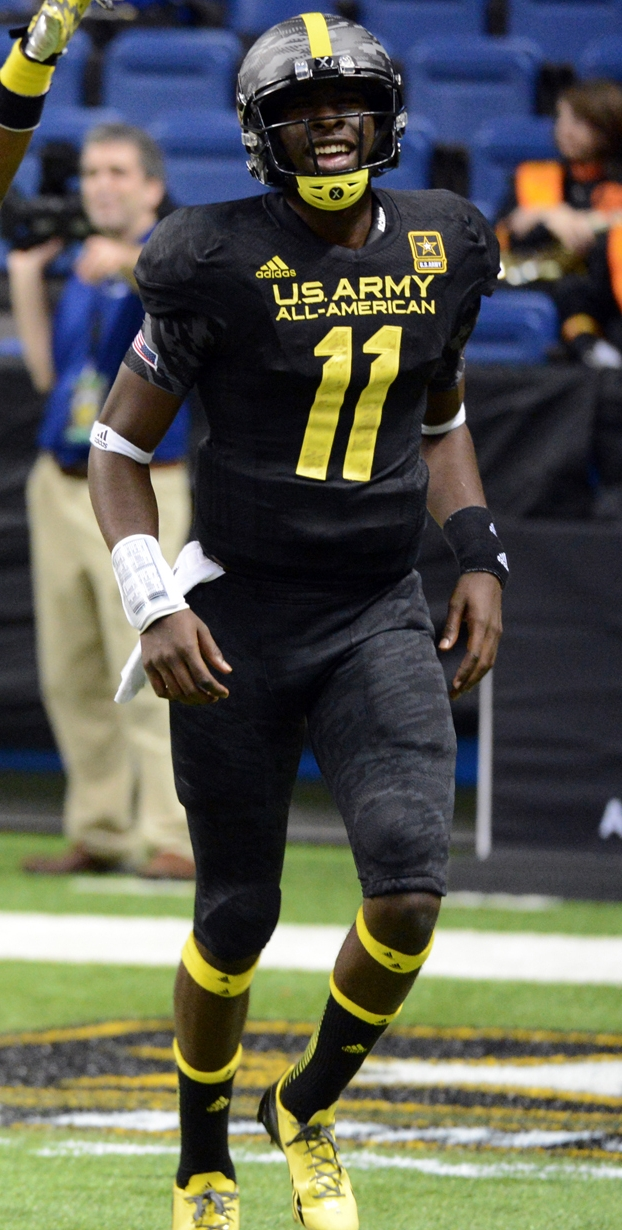
- Johnson at the U.S. Army All-American Bowl, 2013

Caudillos de Chihuahua
- Position: Quarterback
- Roster status: Active

Personal information
- Born: September 23, 1994 (age 32); Montgomery, Alabama, U.S.
- Listed height: 6 ft 4 in (1.93 m)
- Listed weight: 234 lb (106 kg)

Career information
- High school: George Washington Carver (Montgomery)
- College: Auburn (2013–2016)
- NFL draft: 2017: undrafted

Career history

Playing
- Columbus Lions (2018); Saskatchewan Roughriders (2018)*; West Virginia Roughriders (2019); Spokane Shock (2020)*; Parrilleros de Monterrey (2022); Caudillos de Chihuahua (2023–present)
- * Offseason or practice squad member only

Coaching
- Southlawn Middle School (AL) (2019–2020) Head coach; George Washington Carver HS (AL) (2021) Quarterbacks coach; Montgomery Catholic Prep (AL) (2022) Running backs coach; Montgomery Catholic Prep (AL) (2023–2024) Quarterbacks coach; Charles Henderson HS (AL) (2025–) Offensive coordinator/Quarterbacks coach

Awards and highlights
- 2× Tazón México champion (VI, VII); Tazón México MVP (VII); LFA passing yards leader (2026); 2× LFA passing touchdowns leader (2023, 2026); LFA record: Most passing touchdowns in a season: 32 (2023)

Jeremy Johnson (born September 23, 1994) is an American professional football quarterback for the Caudillos de Chihuahua of the Liga de Fútbol Americano Profesional (LFA). After playing college football at Auburn, he played for several professional teams before leading the Caudillos to back-to-back Tazón México titles in 2023 and 2024.

== Early life ==
Johnson attended George Washington Carver High School in Montgomery, Alabama. As a senior in 2012, he won the Mr. Football Award for best high school football player in Alabama after throwing for 3,193 yards and 31 touchdowns. He was invited to the U.S. Army All-American Bowl in January 2013, where threw for a game-high 64 yards and one touchdown to lead the East team to a 15–8 win. His jersey from Carver was retired on February 6, 2013.

Johnson also starred on the Carver basketball team, earning consecutive first-team all-state honors and an Alabama Mr. Basketball nomination in his final year.

Johnson was rated as a four-star recruit by Scout.com and 247Sports and a three-star recruit by Rivals.com. On May 20, 2012, he committed to play college football for the Auburn over offers such as LSU, Ole Miss, Mississippi State, and Houston. Johnson stuck with his commitment through the firing of Gene Chizik and subsequent hiring of Gus Malzahn as head coach of the Tigers.

College recruiting
Name	Hometown	School	Height	Weight	Commit date
Jeremy Johnson; QB	Montgomery, Alabama	Carver	6 ft 5 in (1.96 m)	215 lb (98 kg)	May 20, 2012
Jeremy Johnson; QB	Recruit ratings: Scout: Rivals: 247Sports: ESPN:				
Overall recruit ranking: Scout: 24 (QB) Rivals: 5 (PP QB) 247Sports: 11 (PP QB) ESPN: 9 (PP QB)
Note: In many cases, Scout, Rivals, 247Sports, On3, and ESPN may conflict in their listings of height and weight.; In these cases, the average was taken. ESPN grades are on a 100-point scale.; Sources: "Auburn Football Commitments". Rivals.; "2013 Auburn Football Commits". Scout.; "ESPN". ESPN.; "Scout.com Team Recruiting Rankings". Scout.; "2013 Team Ranking". Rivals.com.

== College career ==
As a freshman in 2013, Johnson competed for the starting job against Nick Marshall, who became the starter for that season. On October 12, 2013, Johnson earned his first start against Western Carolina in place of an injured Marshall and had 201 passing yards with four touchdowns and an interception in a 62–3 win. Two weeks later against Florida Atlantic, Marshall was injured again and Johnson replaced him as he had 192 yards, two touchdowns, and an interception.

With Marshall suspended for the first half of the 2014 season opener against division opponent Arkansas, Johnson served in his place completing 12 of 16 passes for 243 yards and two touchdowns within just the first half of the game. After Marshall served his suspension, however, Johnson's role throughout the rest of the 2014 season was clean-up duty against overmatched opponents.

Following Nick Marshall's departure from the Auburn football program after the 2014 season, Johnson was named the starter for the 2015 season following spring practice. Many publications had Johnson listed as one of the favorites to win the Heisman trophy and lead Auburn to the CFP. However, the season got off to a rough start. Johnson threw three interceptions in the opening game against Louisville and two more against (FCS) Jacksonville State. Johnson was benched after another multi-turnover performance to rival LSU. Backup Sean White started the rest of the season, with Johnson being used sparingly.

Johnson appeared in multiple games in 2016 but, with lackluster results once again.

=== College statistics ===
		Passing						Rushing			
Year	Team	Comp	Att	Yds	TD	INT	Rate	Att	Yds	Avg	TD
2013	Auburn	29	41	422	6	2	195.7	7	47	6.7	0
2014	Auburn	28	37	436	3	0	201.4	4	-7	-1.8	1
2015	Auburn	95	157	1,054	10	7	129.0	47	137	2.9	6
2016	Auburn	27	47	312	1	2	111.7	15	33	2.2	2
Career		179	282	2,224	20	11	145.3	73	210	2.9	9

== Professional career ==
Pre-draft measurables
Height	Weight	Arm length	Hand span	40-yard dash	10-yard split	20-yard split	20-yard shuttle	Three-cone drill	Vertical jump	Broad jump
6 ft 4 1/4 in (1.94 m)	232 lb (105 kg)	33 1/4 in (0.84 m)	9 3/8 in (0.24 m)	4.75 s	1.60 s	2.76 s	4.46 s	7.07 s	31.5 in (0.80 m)	9 ft 6 in (2.90 m)
All values from Pro Day

After going undrafted in the 2017 NFL draft, Johnson was invited to attend the New York Giants rookie minicamp as a tryout player. That summer, he hired an agent and trained in Miami with hopes of earning a professional basketball contract.

On March 3, 2018, Johnson signed with the Columbus Lions of the National Arena League (NAL). He was on the practice squad for the Saskatchewan Roughriders of the Canadian Football League (CFL) from June 28 to July 2, 2018.

Johnson joined the West Virginia Roughriders of the American Arena League and made his debut with the team on April 15, 2019.

In November 2020, he signed with the Rarámuris de Ciudad Juárez of the Fútbol Americano de México (FAM) league ahead of the 2021 season.

Johnson signed another FAM team, the Parrilleros de Monterrey, ahead of the 2022 season. In seven games, he threw for 1,538 yards and 16 touchdowns with six interceptions, earning team MVP honors.

On December 27, 2022, Johnson joined the Caudillos de Chihuahua of the Liga de Fútbol Americano Profesional (LFA), the top league in Mexico, after the FAM league shut down operations. He led the team to the best record in the league, finishing 10–0 in the regular season. Johnson then guided the Caudillos to a 10–0 victory over the Dinos de Saltillo in Tazón México VI. They became the first team in LFA history to complete a perfect season, doing it in their first year in the league. Johnson completed 156 of 260 passes for 2,465 yards and a league-leading 32 touchdowns with three interceptions.

In February 2024, Johnson re-signed with the Caudillos de Chihuahua. He guided the team to an 8–0 regular-season record before leading them to their second straight title by beating the Raptors de Naucalpan in Tazón México VII. He was named the Tazón México MVP after throwing for two touchdowns and rushing for two touchdowns in the 34–14 win.

Johnson retired following the 2024 season.

On May 27, 2025, Johnson came out of retirement and re-signed with the Caudillos de Chihuahua.

== Coaching career ==
Johnson began his coaching career in 2019 as the head football coach at Southlawn Middle School in Montgomery. In 2021, he joined the coaching staff at his alma mater, George Washington Carver as quarterbacks coach. Johnson was hired at Montgomery Catholic Preparatory School as running backs coach in 2021 and took over as quarterbacks coach the following season. After helping Montgomery Catholic Prep to back-to-back state titles in 2023 and 2024, he was hired as the offensive coordinator and quarterbacks coach at Charles Henderson High School on January 8, 2025.
