= DeAndre Elliott =

American football player (born 1992)

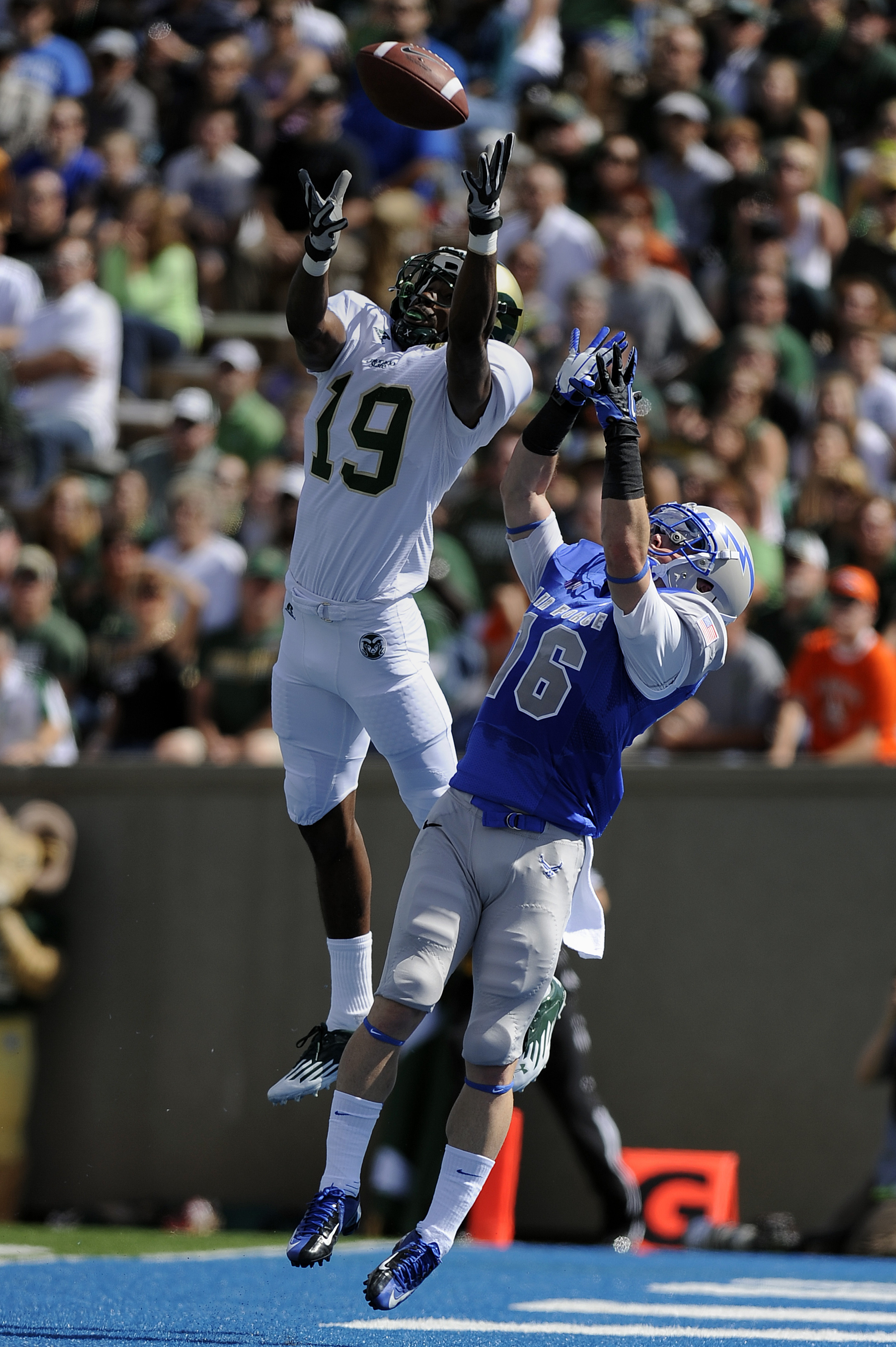
- Elliott (left) with Colorado State in 2012

No. 22 – Reyes de Jalisco
- Position: Cornerback

Personal information
- Born: November 21, 1992 (age 33); Dallas, Texas, U.S.
- Listed height: 6 ft 1 in (1.85 m)
- Listed weight: 189 lb (86 kg)

Career information
- High school: Dallas Carter (Dallas)
- College: Colorado State (2012–2015)
- NFL draft: 2016: undrafted

Career history
- Seattle Seahawks (2016–2017); Reyes de Jalisco (2023–present)

Career NFL statistics
- Total tackles: 8
- Stats at Pro Football Reference

DeAndre Elliott (born November 21, 1992) is an American professional football cornerback who plays for the Reyes de Jalisco. He played college football at Colorado State.

== College career ==
Elliott was a four-year starter at Colorado State. As a senior in 2015, he recorded 32 tackles, two interceptions, four pass breakups, and a blocked kick in 11 starts. He finished his college career with seven interceptions, including one returned 76 yards for a touchdown, 27 pass breakups, two fumble recoveries, and 124 tackles.

Elliott earned his bachelor's degree in communication studies.

== Professional career ==
Pre-draft measurables
Height	Weight	Arm length	Hand span	Wingspan	40-yard dash	10-yard split	20-yard split	20-yard shuttle	Three-cone drill	Vertical jump	Broad jump	Bench press
6 ft 0 7/8 in (1.85 m)	188 lb (85 kg)	32 in (0.81 m)	9 5/8 in (0.24 m)	6 ft 5 5/8 in (1.97 m)	4.55 s	1.50 s	2.66 s	3.94 s	6.93 s	41.0 in (1.04 m)	10 ft 5 in (3.18 m)	12 reps
All values from NFL Combine/Pro Day

Elliott signed with the Seattle Seahawks as an undrafted free agent on May 6, 2016. He played in 13 regular season games as a rookie, as well as two playoff games, mostly on special teams.

On September 2, 2017, Elliott was placed on injured reserve with a failed physical designation.

On July 26, 2018, Elliot was waived by the Seattle Seahawks and placed on injured reserve after a failed physical.
