= Parrilleros de Monterrey =

Mexican American football team

Logo

General information
- Founded: 30 November 2021
- Folded: 2022
- Stadium: Estadio Banorte
- Headquartered: Monterrey, Nuevo León, Mexico
- Colours: Orange, black and white

Personnel
- Head coach: Edmundo Reyes

League / conference affiliations
- Fútbol Americano de México

The Parrilleros de Monterrey (English: Monterrey Grillers) were an American football team based in Monterrey, Nuevo León, Mexico. The Parrilleros competed in Fútbol Americano de México (FAM) for a single season in 2022, losing in the championship game, before the league folded. The team played its home games at the Estadio Banorte, with a capacity of 10,057 seated spectators.

== History ==
On 30 November 2021, Fútbol Americano de México held a press conference to announce that an expansion team based in Monterrey, then known simply as Monterrey Football Team, would be joining the league for its upcoming season. The cities of Puebla, León and Mazatlán had also been considered. Former Auténticos Tigres UANL head coach Edmundo Reyes was introduced as the team's director of operations, though he was later named head coach as well, and Estadio Banorte was announced as their home stadium. Additionally, fans were given the chance to pick the team name via social media vote, with the choices being Parrilleros, Jinetes and Patrones. The name Parrilleros was ultimately chosen by the fan base, reflecting the deep-rooted local tradition of grilling carne asada on parrilleros in the company of friends and family.

In December, the Parrilleros announced the first member of their roster, Eduardo Castañeda, who played for the Rhein Fire in NFL Europe. The team held tryouts in February 2022 in search of local talent, with 50 players attending. The following month, they announced the signing of former Auburn quarterback Jeremy Johnson – their first foreign player.

The Parrilleros played their first game on 29 April 2022, defeating the Caudillos de Chihuahua 28–9 to open the 2022 FAM season. Johnson threw for three touchdowns in the win, including the first touchdown in franchise history to receiver Kobe Miranda, in front of a crowd of over 5,000 spectators. After winning their first five games, the Parrilleros suffered their first defeat against the Tequileros de Jalisco at home in week 6. They suffered a second defeat two weeks later against the Jefes de Ciudad Juárez. Nevertheless, the team finished the regular season with a 6–2 record and first place in the standings. Johnson was named team MVP after throwing for 1,538 yards and 16 touchdowns, along with six interceptions, in seven games.

In the playoffs, the Parrilleros beat the Caudillos de Chihuahua 27–23 in the semifinals after overcoming a 13-point deficit. However, they went on to lose to the Rojos CDMX by a score of 21–14 in the Balón de Plata, the FAM championship game, falling just short of winning a league title in their inaugural season.

FAM shut down its operations in September 2022 due to financial struggles. Three FAM teams joined the rival league, the Liga de Fútbol Americano Profesional (LFA), for the following season. However, the Parrilleros were left without a league as the LFA already had a team in Monterrey, the Fundidores. Many Parrilleros players ended up signing with LFA teams.

== Season-by-season ==
Season	Head coach	Regular season				Postseason			
Season	Head coach	Won	Lost	Win %	Finish	Won	Lost	Win %	Result
2022	Edmundo Reyes	6	2	.750	1st (League)	1	1	.500	Won Semifinal (Caudillos) 27–23; Lost Balón de Plata (Rojos) 14–21
Total		6	2	.750		1	1	.500	

== Notable players ==
- Jeremy Johnson
- Octavio González
- Eduardo Castañeda
