= Tavares Martin =

American football player (born 1996)

Fehérvár Enthroners
- Position: Wide receiver
- Roster status: Active

Personal information
- Born: February 4, 1996 (age 30); Belle Glade, Florida, U.S.
- Listed height: 6 ft 1 in (1.85 m)
- Listed weight: 185 lb (84 kg)

Career information
- High school: Dwyer (FL)
- College: Washington State
- NFL draft: 2018: undrafted

Career history
- Massachusetts Pirates (2019); Spokane Shock (2020); Vienna Vikings (2022); Carolina Cobras (2023); Reyes de Jalisco (2023); Fehérvár Enthroners (2023–present)

Career CFL statistics
- Receptions: 17
- Receiving yards: 253
- Receiving touchdowns: 5

Tavares Martin Jr. (born February 4, 1996) is an American football wide receiver for the Fehérvár Enthroners of the European League of Football (ELF). He also played for the Vienna Vikings in the Austrian Football League and Reyes de Jalisco in LFA. Martin played college football at Washington State.

== Early life ==
Martin attended John I. Leonard Community High School in Greenacres, Florida for his first three years of high school before transferring to William T. Dwyer High School for his senior year. As a senior at Dwyer, he caught 37 passes for 641 yards and six touchdowns. He committed to play football for the Washington State Cougars in May 2015.

== College career ==
As a true freshman in 2015, Martin played in 12 of Washington State's 13 games, catching 16 passes for 124 yards and one touchdown along with returning 25 kickoffs for 552 yards.

In 2016, as a sophomore, Martin started in all 13 games, recording 64 receptions for 728 yards and seven touchdowns. He also returned seven kickoffs for 147 yards.

As a junior in 2017, Martin played in 11 of 13 games, catching 70 passes for 831 yards and nine touchdowns. He missed Washington State's game against Colorado due to suspension and the 2017 Holiday Bowl after he was cut from the team due to a "violation of team rules" according to a WSU athletic spokesperson. However, Martin stated he was cut after he asked for his release. He declared for the 2018 NFL draft on January 13, 2018, but was not drafted and remained unsigned.

In his three seasons with the Cougars, Martin finished as one of the all time leaders in receptions (150), yards (1683), and touchdown catches (17). He also was a main kick returner for the team.

== Professional career ==
=== Massachusetts Pirates ===
Martin signed with the Massachusetts Pirates of the National Arena League for the 2019 season.

=== Spokane Shock ===
For the 2020 season, which was cancelled or postponed due to the COVID-19 pandemic, he was on the Spokane Shock roster.

=== Vienna Vikings ===
In 2022, Martin was signed mid-season and played for the Vienna Vikings in the Austrian Football League. He had 12 catches for 204 yards and four touchdowns in four games played in the regular season. In the two playoff games, Martin had 12 receptions for 263 yards and two touchdowns. The Vikings lost in the Austrian Bowl championship game to the Danube Dragons.

=== Carolina Cobras ===
On December 10, 2022, Martin signed with the Carolina Cobras of the National Arena League (NAL).

=== Reyes de Jalisco ===
Despite reportedly joining the Carolina Cobras, Martin joined the Reyes de Jalisco of the Liga de Fútbol Americano Profesional (LFA) in December 2022. In his debut with the team, he caught three touchdown passes as the Reyes defeated the Gallos Negros de Querétaro 42–14.

=== Fehérvár Enthroners ===
The Enthroners signed Martin after week 8 of the ELF season.
