= Estadio Olímpico Universitario José Reyes Baeza =

Multi-use stadium in Chihuahua, Mexico

Coordinates: 28°42′46″N 106°08′38″W

Estadio Olímpico Universitario (official stadium name)
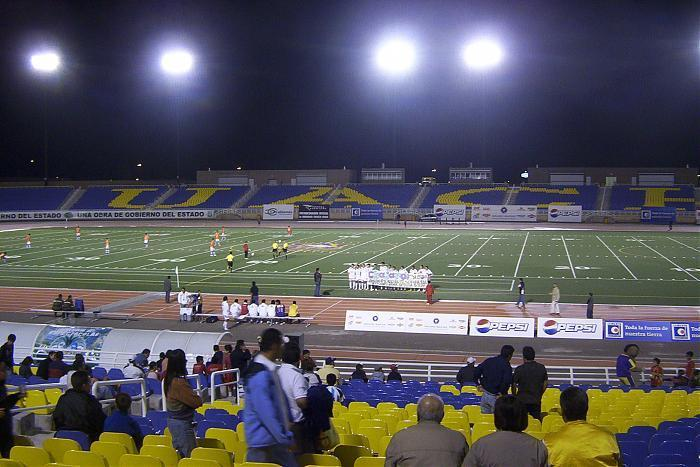
- Interactive map of Estadio Olímpico Universitario (official stadium name)
- Location: Chihuahua, Chihuahua, Mexico
- Owner: UACH
- Operator: UACH
- Capacity: 22,000
- Surface: Turf

Construction
- Groundbreaking: 2006
- Opened: 2007
- Cost: 13,000,000

Tenants
- UACH Águilas (ONEFA) (2007–present); Caudillos de Chihuahua (FAM / LFA) (2020–present); Chihuahua F.C. (Liga Premier) (2022–2024); Raramuris (LFA) (2023–present); Caudillos de Chihuahua (FAM)(2020-present); Chihuahua Rebelión (IFA) (2025)

The Estadio Olímpico Universitario is a multi-use stadium in Chihuahua, Chihuahua, Mexico. It is currently used mostly for football, American football and concerts. The stadium holds 22,000 people.
