= Estadio Banorte (Monterrey) =

Multi-purpose stadium in Monterrey, Nuevo León

- "La Casa de los Borregos"
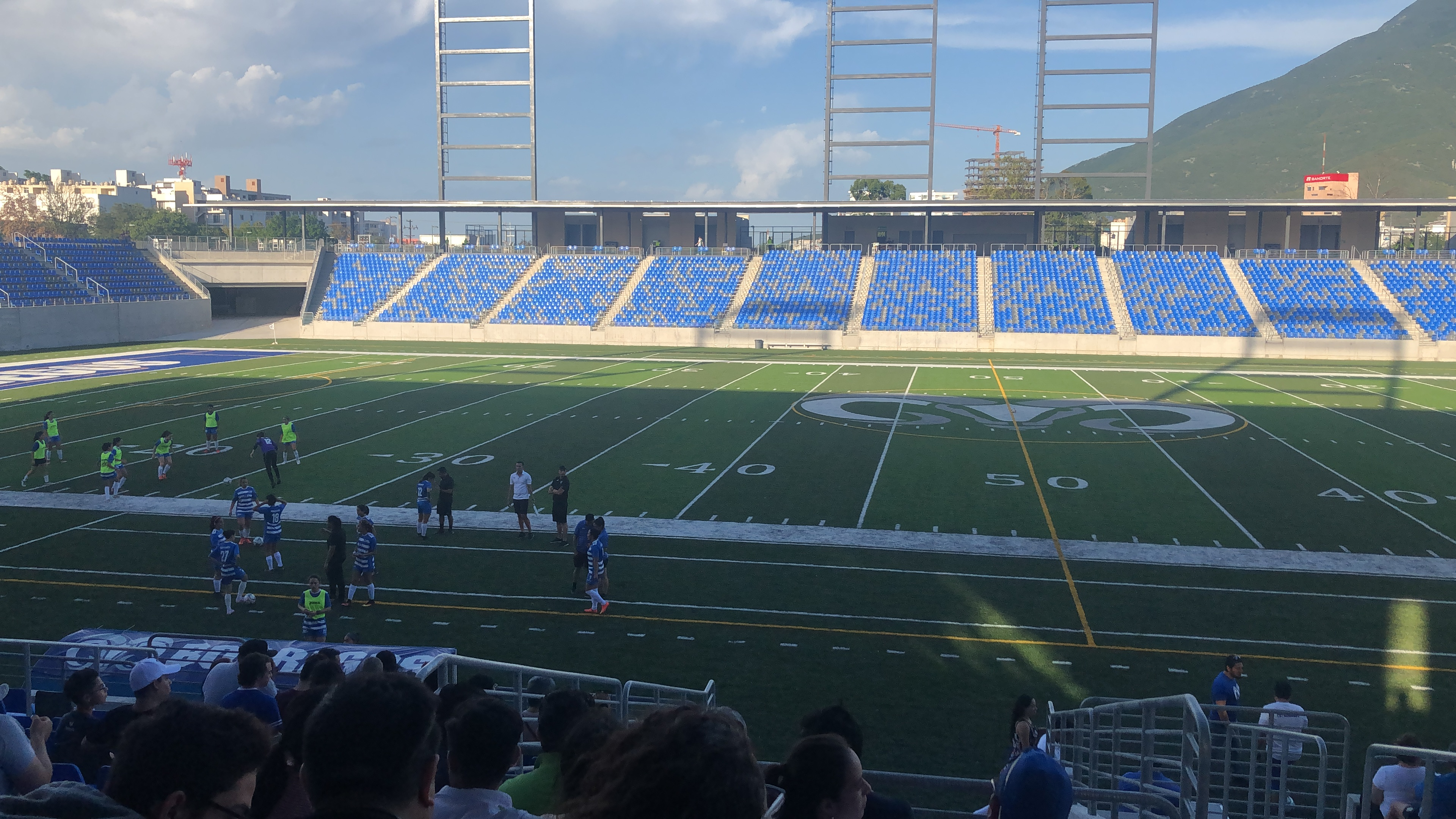
- Interactive map of Estadio Banorte
- Full name: Estadio Banorte
- Location: Monterrey, Nuevo León
- Coordinates: 25°39′14.9″N 100°17′04.9″W
- Owner: Monterrey Institute of Technology and Higher Education
- Operator: Monterrey Institute of Technology and Higher Education
- Capacity: 10,057
- Surface: Artificial turf

Construction
- Opened: 30 April 2019
- Cost: $30 million
- Architect: The Beck Group

Tenants
- Borregos Salvajes Monterrey (ONEFA) (2019–present); Fundidores de Monterrey (LFA) (2020–present); Parrilleros de Monterrey (FAM) (2022)

Estadio Banorte is a multi-purpose stadium in Monterrey, Nuevo León. It is the home stadium for the college football team Borregos Salvajes Monterrey of the ONEFA and the professional American football team Fundidores de Monterrey from the Liga de Fútbol Americano Profesional. The stadium was inaugurated in April 2019 and seats 10,057 spectators.

In March 2021, Mexican bank Banorte was announced as the stadiums's main sponsor.

== History ==
Following the demolition of the Estadio Tecnológico in 2017, after their main tenants, C.F. Monterrey moved to the Estadio BBVA, the Monterrey Institute of Technology and Higher Education (ITESM), owner and operator of the stadium, decided to build a new stadium with smaller capacity to host their sports teams, mainly the American football and association football squads.

The stadium broke ground in 2017 and was inaugurated on 30 April 2019 with an event that involved the student community of the ITESM.

On 3 May 2019, Borregos Salvajes played their first American football game against the UBC Thunderbirds, winning 24–17.

Fundidores de Monterrey moved to the stadium for the LFA 2020 season from the Estadio Nuevo León Unido, which could only accommodate 1,500 people.

The stadium also hosted Parrilleros de Monterrey of the Fútbol Americano de México league during 2022 on the team's only season, since the league dissolved in September 2022.

== Facilities ==
The stadium is part of the Centro Deportivo Borregos, a sports complex within the Monterrey Institute of Technology and Higher Education campus, that also includes: a smaller stadium with capacity of 2,000 spectators, a track and field stadium, a multi-use field, two grass fields, two fast football fields, one flag football field and one turf football field.

Estadio Borregos has six dressing rooms for players and two for referees, a fully equipped gymnasium a physiotherapy room and an athlete lounge.

== Concerts ==
The stadium hosted Dua Lipa's Future Nostalgia Tour in September 2022 and Muse's Will of the People World Tour in January 2023

Date	Artist	Tour
8, 9 July 2022	(Mexico) Maná	México Lindo y Querido
23 September 2022	(England) Dua Lipa	Future Nostalgia Tour
18 January 2023	(England) Muse	Will of the People World Tour
21 February 2023	(England) Def Leppard / (United States) Mötley Crüe	The World Tour
19 May 2023	(United States) Imagine Dragons	Mercury World Tour
18 August 2023 (cancelled)	~~(United States) Lana Del Rey~~	~~Del Rey's 2023–2025 tour~~
29 September 2023	(Puerto Rico) Ricky Martin	Sinfónico
14, 15, 16 November 2023	(Mexico) Luis Miguel	Luis Miguel Tour 2023–24
22, 24 August 2024	(Mexico) Luis Miguel	Luis Miguel Tour 2023–24
5 February 2025	(United States) Linkin Park	From Zero World Tour
24 February 2025	(United States) Twenty-One Pilots	The Clancy World Tour
12 November 2025	(United States) Foo Fighters (United States) Queens of the Stone Age (France) Jehnny Beth	Corona Capital Sessions: Monterrey / The Catacombs Tour
