= Estadio José Ortega Martínez =

Football stadium in Naucalpan, Mexico

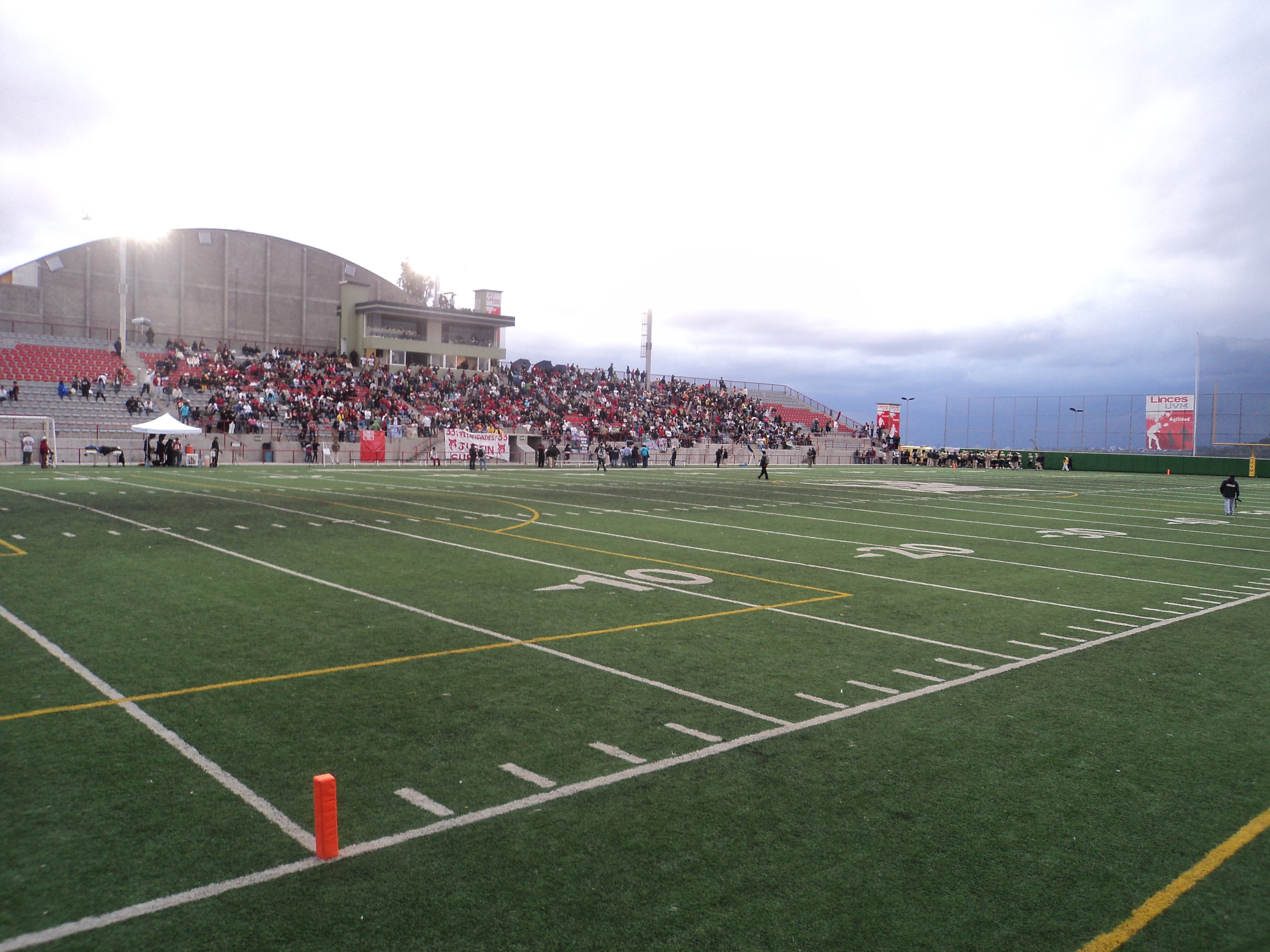
- Interactive map of Estadio José Ortega Martínez
- Location: Naucalpan de Juárez, State of Mexico, Mexico
- Coordinates: 19°30′25.8″N 99°15′52.5″W
- Owner: Universidad del Valle de México
- Operator: Universidad del Valle de México
- Capacity: 3.700
- Surface: Artificial turf

Construction
- Opened: 2010
- Cost: > 100,000,000 MXN$

Tenants
- Linces Lomas Verdes (ONEFA) 2010–present Águilas Blancas (ONEFA) 2010–present Burros Blancos (ONEFA) 2010–present Raptors Naucalpan (LFA) (2018, 2020, 2023-present)

The Estadio José Ortega Martínez also known as Valley Bowl Stadium, is a stadium of football with capacity for 3,700 people located in Naucalpan, State of Mexico, campus Lomas Verdes Universidad del Valle de Mexico. The stadium is the home team american football representative of the university, the Linces Lomas Verdes.

The property had a cost of over 100 million pesos and was opened to house the major league games of the ONEFA from the 2010 season. The stadium has synthetic grass, bucket seats, dressing rooms, bathrooms, electronic scoreboard, food area, large capacity light lighting, and a press box for the height of the yard 50.
