= Fútbol Americano de México =

Defunct Pro American football league in Mexico

Mexican American Professional Football
- Most recent season or competition: 2022 FAM season
- Sport: American football
- Founded: 7 August 2018
- First season: 2019
- Folded: 2022
- Director: Edgar Zapata
- No. of teams: 5 (2019), 7 (2020–2021), 9 (2022)
- Country: Mexico
- Headquarters: Mexico City, Mexico
- Last champion: Rojos de la Ciudad de México
- Most titles: Pioneros de Querétaro; Rojos de la Ciudad de México (1)
- Related competitions: Liga de Fútbol Americano Profesional, North Louisiana Football Alliance
- Website: LigaFAM.mx

Mexican American Football (Spanish: Fútbol Americano de México, FAM) was a professional American football minor league in Mexico, founded in 2018. Due to sponsorship reasons, the league was also known as FAM-YOX for the 2022 season.

Starting with five teams, the FAM expanded to seven members in 2020 and nine members in 2022 in the cities of Cancún, Chihuahua, Ciudad Juárez, Jalisco, Mexico City, Monterrey, Naucalpan, San José del Cabo and Zapopan. The FAM season spanned eight regular season games in May and June with each team playing every other team in the league once. The postseason ran in July.

Alongside the Liga de Fútbol Americano Profesional (LFA), the FAM was the top level of professional American football in Mexico, as both leagues competed for television exposure, players, and coaches.

The league announced it would shut down operations in late 2022.

== History ==
Mexican American Football (FAM) was founded on August 7, 2018, as Liga de Football Pro (LFP). The league was founded by the same initial investors of the Liga de Fútbol Americano Profesional (LFA), which had been operating since 2016, with the intention of competing directly with them, offering a different business model. According to the league, their final goal was to merge with the LFA with the two league champions playing in a bowl, similar to the Super Bowl after the AFL–NFL merger.

=== 2019 ===
The league held its inaugural season in 2019 with five teams: Bulldogs de Naucalpan, Centauros de Ciudad Juárez, Pioneros de Querétaro, Tequileros de Jalisco and the Titanes de la Ciudad de México. The Pioneros finished as the first league champions after beating the Centauros 16–0 in the final.

=== 2020 ===
In 2020 the league added the Caudillos de Chihuahua (Chihuahua Chieftains) as the first FAM expansion team, while the Rojos de Lindavista (Lindavista Reds) and Marlins de Los Cabos (Cabos Marlins) would join soon thereafter. In July the Pioneros decided to withdraw from the league and joined the Liga de Fútbol Americano Profesional (LFA) for the 2020 season, while the Titanes disbanded. The season had to be canceled due to the COVID-19 pandemic in Mexico after only four weeks.

=== 2021 ===
For the 2021 season, the FAM added the Rarámuris de Ciudad Juárez (Juárez Raramuris) and the Tiburones de Cancún (Cancún Sharks), while the Centauros withdrew from the league. In February it was announced that former NFL first-round draft pick Trent Richardson signed with the Caudillos de Chihuahua. When asked of his role on the team Richardson said: "I might play. I might be a part of making decisions or helping out bringing awareness or I might be a part of D – all of the above. So we'll see." In 2021, the Pioneros returned to the FAM. The start of the season was initially postponed from April to June. However, the 2021 season was ultimately canceled due to the COVID-19 pandemic. The league still found success with three players on FAM rosters in 2021 making NFL appearances in 2022.

=== 2022 ===
In 2022, the league returned after a two year hiatus from COVID with nine teams. The league doubled in size since inception despite the break, in large part due to the growing popularity of American football in Mexico, which had recently become the second most popular sport in the country. It also grew in popularity due the signing of a few high profile athletes, such as two ex starting NFL running backs in Trent Richardson and Antonio Andrews.

The league faced financial trouble and shut down operations in September 2022 after being able to finish the season. Multiple teams migrated to the rival LFA league.

== Structure and schedule ==
The league played with National Football League (NFL) rules. The final roster size was 48 players, with each team having up to 16 roster spots for foreign born players (non-Mexican). This also contributed to the high level of competition in the FAM compared to other international leagues (mostly in Europe), which usually allow only two to five roster spots for Americans. Many teams would have 70+ players invited to training camp, which ran in March and April, with final cuts occurring before the season to trim the roster to the final size of 48.

For the 2022 season, the league had five US based tryouts across Texas, Florida, Alabama, Louisiana, and California. Each tryout consisted of 30 to 70 athletes across a range of skill levels and experience, from recent high school standouts to former NFL players. The league also had local regional tryouts in Mexico, mostly selecting players from ONEFA, the highest division of Mexican collegiate football.

The salary cap for FAM teams was $1,300,000 Mexican pesos (approximately $66,000 USD) for the entire season. The purpose of the salary cap was to prevent the team's owners from unsustainable spending on player salaries and to prevent a competitive imbalance among teams, but the league allowed additional salary spending for international players (similar to Major League Soccer) that was exempt from the salary cap, in order to increase in on-field competition.

=== Season format ===
The eight-week regular season was held from March through June, with games were held on Saturdays and Sundays. Each team played four home and four away games. Four teams advanced to the playoff each year.

==== Balón de Plata Champions ====
The "Balón de Plata" (Silver Ball) was a single match at the end of the season that determined the season winner and FAM National Champion. The game was played at the home stadium of the higher seed team.

Season	Champion	Score	Runner up	Winner head coach	MVP
2019	Pioneros	16–0	Centauros	Rassielh Lopez	Victor Tejeda (QB)
2020	Season cancelled due to the COVID-19 pandemic				
2021	Season cancelled due to the COVID-19 pandemic				
2022	Rojos	21–14	Parrilleros	Raul Rivera	Terry Stewart Jr. (TE)

== Teams ==
=== Last active franchises ===
Team	City	Stadium	Capacity	First season	Head coach
Bulldogs	Naucalpan de Juárez, Mexico	Estadio Redskins del Estado de México	3,000	2018	Rafael Duk
Caudillos	Chihuahua City, Chihuahua	Estadio Olímpico Universitario José Reyes Baeza	22,000	2019	Federico Landeros
Jefes	Ciudad Juárez, Chihuahua	Estadio 20 de Noviembre	4,000	2022	David Silva
Marlins	San José del Cabo, Baja California Sur	Estadio Complejo Deportivo Don Koll	4,000	2020	César Martínez
Parrilleros	Monterrey, Nuevo León	Estadio Banorte	10,057	2022	Edmundo Reyes
Pioneros	Querétaro City, Querétaro	La Pirámide	4,000	2018	Alberto de León
Rojos	Mexico City	Estadio Jesús Martínez "Palillo"	6,000	2020	Raúl Rivera
Tequileros	Guadalajara, Jalisco	Estadio Panamericano de Hockey/ Estadio Tres de Marzo	2,000/ 18,750	2018	Francisco Vázquez
Tiburones	Cancún, Quintana Roo	Estadio Andrés Quintana Roo/ Coliseo Maya/ Estadio Cancún 86	18,884	2021	Alejandro Evangelista

=== Former teams ===
Team	City	Stadium	Capacity	First season	Last season	Fate
Centauros	Ciudad Juárez, Chihuahua	Chucus Olascoaga	2,000	2019	2019	Folded
Titanes	Mexico City	Deportivo Plan Sexenal	2,275	2019	2019	Folded
Rarámuris	Ciudad Juárez, Chihuahua	Estadio Chucus Olascoaga	5,000	2021	2021	Joined LFA

== Notable players ==
- Antonio Andrews
- Jeremy Johnson
- Mauricio Tyson López
- Kamryn Pettway
- Trent Richardson
- Khiry Robinson
- Troy Stoudermire
