= Reyes de Jalisco =

Mexican American football team

- Logo
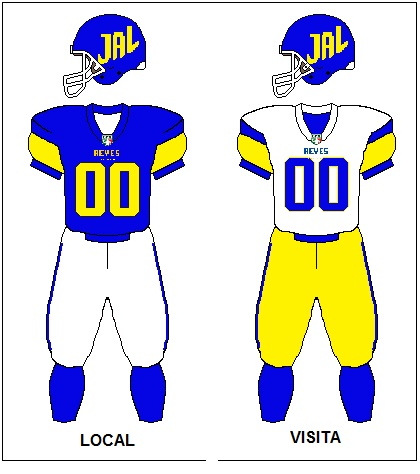
- Uniforms

General information
- Founded: December 20, 2021; 4 years ago
- Stadium: Estadio La Fortaleza Azul
- Headquartered: Zapopan, Mexico
- Colours: Blue and gold

Personnel
- Owner: Luis Orozco
- Head coach: Guillermo Gutiérrez

League / conference affiliations
- Liga de Fútbol Americano Profesional

Reyes de Jalisco (English: Jalisco Kings) are an American football team based in Zapopan, Mexico. The Reyes compete in the Liga de Fútbol Americano Profesional (LFA), the top American football league in Mexico. The team plays its home games at the Estadio Reyes Comude.

== History ==
The team was established on 20 December 2021 as one of the two expansion teams for the 2022 LFA season, the other team being the Galgos de Tijuana. On that same date, Enrique Alfaro, who led the Mayas to the 2016 and 2017 championships, was appointed as head coach.

The team colors are blue and gold. These colors can be found in the flag and coat of arms of the state of Jalisco.

Placekicker Gabriel Amavizca, who previously played for the CFL team Hamilton Tiger-Cats, was the first player signed by the Reyes.

In their first season, the Reyes reached the playoffs as the fifth seed, but lost the wild card game to the Raptors 6–26.

== Season-by-season ==
Season	Head coach	Regular season				Postseason			
Season	Head coach	Won	Lost	Win %	Finish	Won	Lost	Win %	Result
2022	Ernesto Alfaro	3	3	.500	5th (League)	0	1	.000	Lost Wild Card round at (Raptors) 26–6
2023	Ernesto Alfaro	7	3	.700	3rd (League)	1	1	.500	won Wild Card round vs (Galgos) 15–3 Lost Wild Card round at (Dinos) 17–10
2024	Ernesto Alfaro	1	7	.125	9th (League)	"Did not qualify"			
2025	Ernesto Alfaro	1	7	.125	8th (League)	"Did not qualify"			
Total		12	20	.375		1	2	.333	

== Notable players ==
See Category:Reyes de Jalisco players
