= Estadio 20 de Noviembre =

Sports venue in Ciudad Juárez, Mexico

- Interactive map of Estadio 20 de Noviembre
- Location: Ciudad Juárez, Mexico
- Coordinates: 31°44′10.5″N 106°27′31.9″W
- Owner: Ciudad Juárez Government
- Operator: Instituto Municipal del Deporte y Cultura Física de Ciudad Juárez
- Capacity: 5,000
- Surface: Artificial turf

Construction
- Renovated: 2022

Tenant
- Jefes de Ciudad Juárez (LFA) (2022–present)

Estadio 20 de Noviembre is a multi-purpose stadium in Ciudad Juárez, Mexico. It is the home stadium for the professional American football team Jefes de Ciudad Juárez from the Liga de Fútbol Americano Profesional (LFA). The stadium is property of the Ciudad Juárez government and is operated by the Instituto Municipal del Deporte y Cultura Física de Ciudad Juárez. The stadium has a capacity of 5,000 seated spectators.

== General information ==
Estadio 20 de Noviembre is currently used for professional American football games. The stadium has an artificial turf surface and a 400 m tartan track around the field used for athletics. It also has an open area with exercise machines.

The stadium was renovated in 2022 in order to host the Jefes de Ciudad Juárez in their inaugural season as part of Fútbol Americano de México, one of the two professional American football leagues in Mexico, alongside Liga de Fútbol Americano Profesional. These works included installing artificial turf, expanding the stadium's capacity with metal grandstands and refurbishing the locker rooms and bathrooms.
