= Reds de la Ciudad de México =

Mexican American football team

Logo

General information
- Founded: 2020; 6 years ago
- Folded: 2024; 2 years ago
- Stadium: Estadio ITESM CCM
- Headquartered: Tlalpan, Mexico City, Mexico
- Colours: Red, black and white

Personnel
- Owner: Grupo Xoy Capital

League / conference affiliations
- Fútbol Americano de México; 2020–2022; Liga de Fútbol Americano Profesional; 2023–present Central

Championships
- FAM title(s): 0; 2022

Reds de la Ciudad de México (English: Mexico City Reds) are an American football team based in Mexico City, Mexico. The Reds compete in the Liga de Fútbol Americano Profesional, the top American football league in Mexico. The team plays its home games at the Estadio ITESM CCM.

== History ==
=== Beginnings ===
The team was established in 2020 as Rojos de Lindavista and joined Fútbol Americano de México (FAM) as an expansion team to compete in the 2020 season; nevertheless, the season was canceled in March 2020 due to the COVID-19 pandemic with only four games played (the Rojos had a 1–3 record at the moment that the season was canceled).

=== Raúl Rivera era (2020–present) ===
In October 2020, the team was rebranded as Rojos CDMX and Raúl Rivera, who previously led Pumas CU to several college championships, was appointed as head coach.

The 2021 FAM season was also canceled due to the COVID-19 pandemic and the league returned to play in 2022. The Rojos won the 2022 FAM season after finishing the regular season with a 6–2 record and as the second best team. In the semifinals, they defeated the Cabo Marlins 40–0 and won the final against the Parrilleros de Monterrey 21–14.

On 14 September 2022, after the dissolution of FAM, the team, now rebranded as Reds, joined the Liga de Fútbol Americano Profesional as one of the three expansions teams ahead of the 2023 LFA season, the others being Caudillos de Chihuahua and Jefes de Ciudad Juárez. It was also announced that the team will play in the Estadio Jesús Martínez "Palillo"; nevertheless, it was later announced that the team would play in the Estadio ITESM CCM, with a capacity of 2,500 spectators.

=== Team names ===
- Rojos de Lindavista (2020)
- Rojos CDMX (2021–2022)
- Reds de la Ciudad de México (2023–present)

== Season-by-season ==
Season	League	Head coach	Regular season				Postseason			
Season	League	Head coach	Won	Lost	Win %	Finish	Won	Lost	Win %	Result
2020	FAM	Hugo Ibarra	1	3	.250	3rd (Division)	Postseason cancelled due to the COVID-19 pandemic			
2021	FAM	Raúl Rivera	Season cancelled due to the COVID-19 pandemic							
2022	FAM	Raúl Rivera	6	2	.750	2nd	2	0	1.000	Won FAM Championship game (Parrilleros) 21–14
2023	LFA	Raúl Rivera	6	4	.600	4th (League)				
2024	LFA	Suspended operations								
Total			8	5	.625		2	0	1.000	

== Notable players ==
- Quinten Pounds
