= Jefes de Ciudad Juárez =

Mexican American football team

Logo

General information
- Founded: 18 March 2022; 4 years ago
- Folded: 2025; 1 year ago
- Stadium: Estadio 20 de Noviembre
- Headquartered: Ciudad Juárez, Mexico
- Colours: Black, red, gold and white
- Website: jefesprofootball.com

Personnel
- Owner: César Durán
- Head coach: Eduardo Araujo

League / conference affiliations
- Fútbol Americano de México; 2022; Liga de Fútbol Americano Profesional; 2023–2024

Jefes de Ciudad Juárez (English: Ciudad Juárez Chiefs) are an American football team based in Ciudad Juárez, Mexico. The Jefes compete in the Liga de Fútbol Americano Profesional (LFA), the top American football league in Mexico, after playing its inaugural season in the Fútbol Americano de México league. The team plays its home games at the Estadio 20 de Noviembre, with a capacity of 5,000 seated spectators.

== History ==
On 18 March 2022, the team was presented at a press conference in Ciudad Juárez as an expansion team in the Fútbol Americano de México (FAM) league, with César Durán as the owner and president and David Silva as its first head coach. The inaugural 48-man roster was revealed the following month and included 16 foreign players, all with NCAA Division I or Division II experience.

The Jefes played their first game on 30 April 2022, kicking off the 2022 season with an 18–0 victory over the Bulldogs de Naucalpan at the Estadio Jaime Labastida. Andre Dowdell caught the first touchdown in team history from quarterback Andrés Chío in their first drive. The following week, the Jefes lost 18–16 to the Rojos CDMX in their home opener. After another loss in week 3, the team fired head coach David Silva and promoted linebackers coach Mario Diaz to the position. The Jefes finished their inaugural season with a 3–5 record, failing to qualify for the playoffs.

=== League change ===
On 30 September 2022, the FAM league announced it was shutting down operations, leaving the Jefes without a league. In October, the team announced it was joining the Liga de Fútbol Americano Profesional (LFA) for its upcoming season with Lorenzo Gathers as the new head coach. He became the first non-Mexican coach in LFA history.

On 26 March, Jefes fired Lorenzo Gathers after the team failed to win a single game on their first four matches; Gathers was replaced by Randall Mendoza. Later, Gathers published a letter in which he pointed out the team's disorganization, such as not paying the players and staff and not allowing him to choose his coaching staff.

== Season-by-season ==
Season	League	Head coach	Regular season				Postseason			
Season	League	Head coach	Won	Lost	Win %	Finish	Won	Lost	Win %	Result
2022	FAM	David Silva/Mario Díaz	3	5	.375	7th	Did not qualify			
2023	LFA	Lorenzo Gathers/Randall Mendoza	1	9	.100	10th	Did not qualify			
2024	LFA	Eduardo Araujo	3	5	.375	6th	0	1	.000	Lost Wild Card round at (Raptors) 26–30
Total			7	19	.269					

== Notable players ==
See Category:Jefes de Ciudad Juárez players
