= Caudillos de Chihuahua =

Mexican American football team

Logo

General information
- Founded: 1 August 2019; 7 years ago
- Stadium: Estadio Olímpico Universitario José Reyes Baeza
- Headquartered: Chihuahua City, Mexico
- Colours: Navy blue, metallic sunburst and gold

Personnel
- Owner: Jorge Ginther
- Head coach: Federico Landeros Rodríguez

League / conference affiliations
- Fútbol Americano de México; 2020–2022; Liga de Fútbol Americano Profesional; 2023–present

Championships
- Tazón México championship(s): 0; 3: 2023 (VI), 2024 (VII), 2026 (IX)
- League Titles: 0; 3: (2023, 2024, 2026)

Caudillos de Chihuahua (English: Chihuahua Leaders) are an American football team based in Chihuahua City, Mexico. The Caudillos compete in the Liga de Fútbol Americano Profesional (LFA), the top American football league in Mexico. The team plays its home games at the Estadio Olímpico Universitario José Reyes Baeza.

== History ==
The team was announced on 1 August 2019 by Jorge Ginther, team owner and president, as an expansion franchise of Fútbol Americano de México for the 2020 season. In the press conference Ginther also announce that the head coach would be Mauricio Balderrama and the team had no name yet, and it would be chosen by the fans by a Facebook poll.

On 9 August, the team announced that the name chosen by the fans was Caudillos de Chihuahua. Also, the team announced that the fans would choose the team colors and logo.

The first try out was in Chihuahua City and in the next months in the cities of Juárez in Chihuahua and El Paso in Texas. In November the team announced they would play his local games on the Estadio Olímpico Universitario José Reyes Baeza.

=== Balderrama era ===
==== 2020 season ====
The Caudillos played their first game on 22 February against the Tequileros de Jalisco as a local team with a 53–13 win. Then, the Caudillos won other three games before the season was cancelled due the COVID-19 pandemic in Mexico. The team had a perfect season with four victories against Tequileros, Rojos, Centauros and Bulldogs.

On 9 February 2022, head coach Mauricio Balderrama announced his resignation for personal reasons.

=== Landeros era ===
After Balderrama's resignation, the Caudillos announced that the new head coach for the 2022 season would be Federico Landeros Rodríguez.

==== 2022 season ====
The Caudillos began their season with a 28–9 loss to the Parrilleros de Monterrey. The next week, the Caudillos hosted the Pioneros de Querétaro in a 43–6 win.

In the several weeks, the Caudillos won another four games against Tequileros de Jalisco, Tiburones de Cancún, Jefes de Ciudad Juárez and Bulldogs de Naucalpan with a mark of 31–14, 62–0, 21-14 and 61-12 respectively. In the other hand, the team loss two games against Rojos CDMX and Cabo Marlins with a mark of 49-40 and 32–29.

The team qualified to the postseason and traveled to Monterrey to play against the Parrilleros, though they lost 27–23.

==== Change of league ====
On 30 September 2022, the FAM League announced its dissolution and after that, the team announced his integration on the Liga de Fútbol Americano Profesional for the 2023 season as the eleventh team in the league.

== Season-by-season ==
Season	Head coach	Regular season						Postseason				
Season	Head coach	WG	LG	TG	AVR	PF	PA	WG	LG	AVR	PF	PA
2020	Mauricio Balderrama	4	0	0	1.000	164	28	Postseason canceled.				
2021	Mauricio Balderrama	Season cancelled due to the COVID-19 pandemic										
2022	Federico Landeros	5	3	0	0.625	296	155	0	1	0.000	23	27
FAM total		9	3	0	0.750	460	183	0	1	0.000	23	27
2023	Federico Landeros	10	0	0	1.000	362	188	2	0	1.000	44	20
2024	Federico Landeros	8	0	0	1.000	252	114	2	0	1.000	54	26
LFA total		18	0	0	1.000	614	302	4	0	1.000	98	46
Overall total		27	3	0	0.900	1,074	485	4	1	0.800	121	73

== Notable players ==
See Category:Caudillos de Chihuahua players
