= Enrique Yenny =

Mexico gridiron football player (born 1994)

Profile
- Position: Kicker

Personal information
- Born: 2 July 1994 (age 32); Aguascalientes City, Mexico
- Listed height: 6 ft 2 in (1.88 m)
- Listed weight: 220 lb (100 kg)

Career information
- College: ITESM Toluca
- CFL draft: 2019 LFA: 1st round, 3rd overall pick

Career history
- Osos de Toluca (2019); Montreal Alouettes (2019)*; Pioneros de Querétaro (2020–2021); Dinos de Saltillo (2022); Reyes de Jalisco (2023); DC Defenders (2024)*
- * Offseason or practice squad member only

Awards and highlights
- 2× LFA All-Star (2019, 2022); LFA scoring leader (2022); Tazón de Campeones champion (2017); 2× CONADEIP champion (2017, 2018); CONADEIP Special Teams Player of the Year (2017); 2× CONADEIP Ideal Team (2017, 2018)

Enrique Gerardo Yenny Romero (born 2 July 1994) is a Mexican professional gridiron football kicker. He played college football with ITESM Toluca, winning a national championship in 2017.

Yenny was drafted by the Osos de Toluca in the first round of the 2019 LFA draft, earning All-Star honors as a rookie. He was also drafted by the Montreal Alouettes of the Canadian Football League (CFL) with the third overall pick of the 2019 CFL–LFA draft, spending one season on the team's practice roster before returning to the LFA as a member of the Pioneros de Querétaro. Yenny was subsequently traded to the Dinos de Saltillo, where he once again earned LFA All-Star honors in 2022 after leading the league in scoring.

== Early life ==
Yenny was born on 2 July 1994 in Aguascalientes City. His father, also named Enrique Yenny, hails from Mexico City while his mother, Zayra Romero, is from Tampico. Yenny initially played association football in high school, but his coach encouraged him to try American football when he saw Yenny punting a ball 60 yards with no training in 2011. He played three seasons of high school football.

== College career ==
Yenny received a scholarship to play college football for the Borregos Salvajes Toluca. In 2015, he successfully converted on seven field goals and 24 extra point attempts, scoring 45 points. In 2016, Yenny made six field goals and 20 extra point attempts, scoring 38 points. He also finished second in the CONADEIP in punting average with 46.5 yards per punt.

=== 2017 season ===
Yenny was named the 2017 CONADEIP Special Teams Player of the Year after successfully converting on five field goals and 16 extra point attempts. He broke the single-season record by punting for 2,657 yards on 57 punts (46.6 average), in addition to recording a league-leading 64-yard average on kickoffs. Yenny was named to the CONADEIP Ideal Team (both as kicker and punter) and was chosen to play in the Stars Bowl against the NCAA Division III All-Stars, where he helped his team come back from a 24–0 deficit to win 28–24.

Borregos Salvajes Toluca finished the regular season with a 7–2 record. In the CONADEIP championship game against Aztecas UDLAP, Yenny kicked the game-winning 54-yard field goal, avenging a prior loss to the Aztecas earlier that season. The following week, Borregos Salvajes Toluca played against the ONEFA champions, Pumas CU, in the Tazón de Campeones 2017 to crown the Mexican national champions. Yenny kicked the game-winning extra point in the final minute of the 16–15 comeback victory to help his team secure the first national title in program history.

=== 2018 season ===
In 2018, Yenny successfully converted on nine field goals and 24 extra point attempts, in addition to recording 40 punts for 1,770 yards. He repeated as a CONADEIP Ideal Team selection. Although the Stars Bowl was not held that year, Yenny was still named to the game's roster as a CONADEIP All-Star. Borregos Salvajes Toluca finished the regular season with a disappointing 3–5 record. However, the team defeated Aztecas UDLAP in the CONADEIP semifinals before upsetting Borregos Salvajes Monterrey in the final for their second straight CONADEIP title.

Yenny finished his collegiate career as the CONADEIP all-time leader in punting yards.

== Professional career ==
=== Osos de Toluca ===
Yenny was selected by the Osos de Toluca of the Liga de Fútbol Americano Profesional (LFA) with the eighth overall pick in the 2019 LFA draft. He was also selected by the Montreal Alouettes of the Canadian Football League (CFL) with the third overall pick of the 2019 CFL–LFA draft, which was held after a select pool of 51 Mexican players showcased their skills in front of CFL coaches and scouts at the CFL–LFA Combine in Mexico City. Yenny played the 2019 LFA season with the Osos. In a Week 4 matchup against the Artilleros de Puebla, he recorded a 94-yard punt, the longest in LFA history. Two weeks later, Yenny kicked a 59-yard field goal against the Raptors de Naucalpan to set a new record for the longest field goal in LFA history. He was named to the LFA All-Star team.

At the conclusion of the LFA season, Yenny joined the Montreal Alouettes training camp in May and was able to learn from veteran kicker Boris Bede. Yenny's performance earned him a spot on the Alouettes' practice roster.

=== Pioneros de Querétaro ===
Yenny joined LFA expansion team Pioneros de Querétaro for the 2020 season, on loan from the Osos de Toluca. In Week 5 against the Dinos de Saltillo, he gave the Pioneros their first win of the season by kicking the game-winning field goal in the 9–8 win. The following week, Yenny broke his own league record for the longest field goal by kicking a 60-yarder against the Artilleros de Puebla. He was re-signed on a permanent basis ahead of the 2021 season. However, the season was postponed and ultimately canceled due to the COVID-19 pandemic.

=== Dinos de Saltillo ===
Yenny was traded to the Dinos de Saltillo in exchange for the second overall pick in the 2021 LFA draft, which was used to select wide receiver Jhovany Haro. In the 2022 season, Yenny went 5 for 9 on field goals and 14 for 16 on extra points, thus winning the LFA scoring title with 29 points. He again earned All-Star honors.

=== Reyes de Jalisco ===
In December 2022, Yenny signed with Reyes de Jalisco ahead of the 2023 LFA season.

=== DC Defenders ===
On 18 October 2023, Yenny signed with the DC Defenders of the XFL. On 15 January 2024, Yenny was selected by the Defenders in the 12th round of the Super Draft portion of the 2024 UFL dispersal draft. He was removed from the roster on 26 February 2024.
