= Ramiro Pruneda =

American football player (born 1983)

No. 74
- Position: Offensive tackle

Personal information
- Born: January 25, 1983 (age 43); Monterrey, Nuevo León, Mexico
- Listed height: 6 ft 7.5 in (2.02 m)
- Listed weight: 297 lb (135 kg)

Career information
- High school: Preparatoria No. 2 (Monterrey, Nuevo León)
- College: ITESM (2002–2006)
- NFL draft: 2006: undrafted

Career history
- Cologne Centurions (2006); Kansas City Chiefs (2007)*; Philadelphia Eagles (2007)*; San Francisco 49ers (2008)*; New York Sentinels (2009)*; Green Bay Blizzard (2011); Laredo Rattlesnakes (2012); Mayas CDMX (2017–2019); Pioneros de Querétaro (2020); Dinos de Saltillo (2022–2024)
- * Offseason or practice squad member only

Awards and highlights
- 2× Tazón México champion (I, II); 4× ONEFA national champion (2002, 2004–2006)

Ramiro Pruneda Zapata (born 25 January 1983) is a Mexican former offensive tackle. He was signed by the Cologne Centurions in 2006. He played college football at ITESM.

Pruneda was also a member of the Kansas City Chiefs, Philadelphia Eagles, New York Sentinels, and Green Bay Blizzard.

== Early life ==
Pruneda was born on 25 January 1983, in Monterrey, Nuevo León, and grew up playing football (soccer) and fútbol rápido. He attended Preparatoria No. 2 in Monterrey. At age 14, Pruneda was invited to try American football by Edgardo "El Biónico" Sánchez, who coached the sport at the school. He joined the school's team, the Vaqueros, playing at offensive lineman and tight end.

== College career ==
Pruneda attended the Monterrey Institute of Technology and Higher Education, where he played college football in Liga Mayor for the Borregos Salvajes Monterrey from 2002 to 2006. He helped the team win four ONEFA national championships and was a three-time ONEFA Best Offensive Lineman. Pruneda was a five-time selection to the Mexico National Team, playing in the Aztec Bowl against an NCAA Division III all-star team.

On December 2, 2011, Pruneda was honored as one of the 55 greatest players in program history during halftime of the national championship game at the Estadio Tecnológico.

== Professional career ==
=== Cologne Centurions ===
Pruneda attended training camp with NFL Europe in 2006 and was assigned to the Cologne Centurions. However, he tore an anterior cruciate ligament in the first week of camp and missed the entire season, returning to Mexico for rehab.

=== Kansas City Chiefs ===
On January 26, 2007, it was announced that Pruneda has signed a two-year contract with the Kansas City Chiefs of the NFL. He was a member of the practice squad until he was released by the team in late October. "It was a good experience for me," said Pruneda. "I was on the practice squad for eight or nine weeks. I was in training camp and I worked for an entire offseason over there. It was good for me, I learned a lot."

=== Philadelphia Eagles ===
On December 12, 2007, Pruneda was signed by the Philadelphia Eagles and assigned to their practice squad, where he remained for the rest of the season. "That was a pretty good year for me on the football field. [...] I made the practice squad and that was a huge step for a Mexican player coming from playing college football in Mexico," he reflected.

=== San Francisco 49ers ===
In June 2008, Solano was assigned to the San Francisco 49ers practice squad as part of the NFL International Development Practice Squad Program, joining the team for training camp. As a participant in the program, his spot was guaranteed throughout the regular season and did not count against the practice squad player limit.

=== New York Sentinels ===
In June 2009, Pruneda was selected by the New York Sentinels of the United Football League (UFL) in the UFL premiere season draft. Despite not being aware of the draft taking place and admitting to not knowing much about the then-upstart league, he nevertheless expressed a desire to play. Pruneda signed a one-year deal with the Sentinels that August.

=== Indoor football ===
In 2011, Pruneda played with the Green Bay Blizzard of the Indoor Football League (IFL). He subsequently joined the Laredo Rattlesnakes of the Lone Star Football League (LSFL) for the 2012 season.

=== Mayas CDMX ===
In 2016, Pruneda signed with the Raptors Naucalpan of the newly-created Mexican Liga de Fútbol Americano Profesional (LFA), but an injury left him off the field for a year. In 2017 he signed for Mayas CDMX. Pruneda helped the team win the first two editions of the Tazón México. He was part of the Mayas roster through the 2019 season.

=== Pioneros de Querétaro ===
On 26 October 2019, Pruneda signed with Pioneros de Querétaro ahead of the 2020 LFA season.

=== Dinos de Saltillo ===
In February 2022, Pruneda signed with Dinos de Saltillo. He retired after the 2024 LFA season.

== Coaching career ==
In 2011, Pruneda joined the coaching staff at the Universidad Regiomontana (UR), serving as the offensive line coach of the Jaguares UR. Following the discontinuation of the program, he took the same position with the Borregos Salvajes CEM in 2012.
