= Silvia Contreras =

Mexican flag football player (born 1993)

Personal information
- Full name: Silvia Yolanda Contreras Medina
- Born: 1993 (age 32–33) Ciudad Obregón, Sonora, Mexico
- Home town: Tijuana, Baja California, Mexico
- Education: CETYS (Lic.)
- Height: 1.70 m (5 ft 7 in)
- Weight: 64 kg (141 lb)

Sport
- Sport: Flag football
- Position: Wide receiver / center / safety
- College team: Osas CETYS
- Club: Osas Flag Football
- Team: Osas de Monterrey
Medal record
Women's flag football
Representing Mexico
World Games
Gold medal – first place	2022 Birmingham	Team
Gold medal – first place	2025 Chengdu	Team
IFAF World Championship
Silver medal – second place	2021 Jerusalem	Team
Silver medal – second place	2024 Lahti	Team
IFAF Americas Continental Championship
Silver medal – second place	2023 Charlotte	Team

Silvia Yolanda Contreras Medina (born 1993) is a Mexican flag football player. She captains the Mexico women's national flag football team and is a two-time World Games gold medalist in 2022 and 2025.

A member of the national team since 2018, Contreras has also won two silver medals at the IFAF World Championship in 2021 and 2024, as well as a silver medal at the inaugural IFAF Americas Continental Championship in 2023. At the national level, she started her own club team in Tijuana, Osas Flag Football, and helps to promote the sport on social media.

== Early life ==
Contreras was born in 1993 in Ciudad Obregón, Sonora, Mexico, and moved with her family to the border city of Tijuana, Baja California, at age three. Her mother encouraged her to stay active in her youth, no matter the sport, leading her to participate in gymnastics, basketball, and athletics throughout primary school. Coming into high school, Contreras was initially interested in becoming a cheerleader. Instead, in 2009 she accompanied a friend to a tryout for her school's first-ever flag football team: "I went with her to see what it was about, and I fell in love with it right away." Claro Sports described Contreras as a "pioneer in Baja California" in the sport.

"The first training session we didn't see or do anything concerning flag football. It was pure conditioning and physical but I liked it and I came back the next day, then the next, and so on until today, 14 years later." – Contreras in 2024 discussing her first training sessions in high school

Contreras attended the Centro de Enseñanza Técnica y Superior (CETYS), Tijuana campus, where she played college flag football for the Osas CETYS Tijuana, contributing to the team's 2014 Liga de Futbol Americano de Banderas Femenil (LIFA) championship. She earned her licentiate degree in marketing administration in 2016.

== Career ==
=== Club career ===
In 2014, Contreras helped the Baja California representative team win the inaugural Torneo del Sol women's 5v5 tournament in Hermosillo.

After graduating from college, Contreras and her friends started their own Tijuana-based club, Osas Flag Football, with Contreras serving as club president and team captain. In 2018, Cadena Noticias reported that she had won "close to 30 [Baja California] state titles". Contreras helped the Osas win the Federación Mexicana de Fútbol Americano (FMFA) national title in 2019. The following year, she helped the team win the women's flag football championship at the International Bowl in Arlington, Texas, United States. She won another FMFA national title with Baja California in 2022.

In 2024, Contreras was selected by the Dinos de Saltillo ahead of the inaugural LFA Torneo de Flag Football Femenil Profesional, sponsored by the Liga de Fútbol Americano Profesional (LFA). She returned for the second LFA tournament in 2025, this time joining the Osas de Monterrey.

In 2026, Contreras helped the Baja California representative team win the inaugural Nacional Élite Flag Football tournament, organized by the FMFA.

=== International career ===
Contreras earned her first call-up to the Mexico women's national flag football team in 2018. She took part in that year's IFAF Flag Football World Championship held in Panama, helping the Mexican team to a fourth-place finish. In an interview with Ensenada newspaper El Vigía, Mexico men's national flag football team hopeful Iván Roberto Méndez Nuza spoke on the significance of Contreras's participation for players from the Baja California region. He said her call-up confirmed to them that it was possible to reach the national team when they had previously thought selectors "would never look at [northern Mexico]". Contreras was called up again for the 2021 IFAF Women's World Championship in Israel. She helped her team reach the final, catching a touchdown pass from Diana Flores in a 31–21 loss to the United States.

The following year, Contreras helped Mexico win the gold medal at the 2022 World Games in Birmingham, Alabama. She caught three touchdown passes from Flores in a 39–6 blowout win over the United States in the final. Contreras also served as an occasional team captain for the first time during the tournament, and was officially named team captain ahead of the 2023 IFAF Americas Continental Championship in Charlotte, North Carolina. She helped Mexico reach the final, catching two touchdown passes from Flores in a 26–21 loss to the United States. The following year, Contreras captained the team at the 2024 IFAF Women's World Championship in Lahti, Finland. She caught two touchdown passes from Flores in a 40–31 win over Japan in the semi-finals. In the final, Contreras recorded a touchdown catch on offense and an interception on an extra point attempt on defense in an eventual 31–18 defeat to the United States.

Ahead of Mexico's gold medal defending campaign at the 2025 World Games in Chengdu, China, Contreras was described by ESPN Deportes as the "emblematic center, captain, and voice of the team". In an August 2025 interview, Contreras expressed confidence in the Mexican team's prospects, stating that their goal was to win a second World Games gold medal by advancing through the group stage undefeated. She noted that the level of flag football's competitive level had grown in recent years, and that "it [excited her] greatly to be able to see and experience this level of competition." After going undefeated in group stage play, Contreras caught four touchdown passes – including three from Tania Rincón – in a 40–0 win over hosts China in the quarterfinals. She caught another touchdown pass from Rincón in their 25–13 semi-final win over Canada, which marked her team-leading seventh touchdown reception. Mexico went on to defeat the United States in the final, 26–21, to capture the gold medal in a historic title defense. However, Contreras was unable to join the team at the 2025 IFAF Americas Continental Championship in Penonomé, Panama, due to injury.

In May 2026, Contreras played in a friendly against Spain in Las Rozas de Madrid, helping Mexico to a 35–25 win. The friendly was scheduled as the conclusion of a series of joint training sessions between the two teams in an agreement between the respective national federations.

In addition to her role as a center and wide receiver, Contreras has also lined up on the defensive side of the ball.

== Personal life ==
In 2013, Contreras received an honorable mention in a sports photography contest sponsored by the Baja California state government; her photo depicted "the roughness of American football". She has sold candies and cookies to help finance her flag football career, which requires frequent trips to Mexico City for national team training camps.

Contreras has worked to promote the sport of flag football in Mexico. She operates a Facebook group called "De FLAG con Silvia", where news and information for players and fans of the game is shared. Contreras owns a sports apparel brand called "Flag Is Life, Flag Is Love", which gained popularity among the Mexican flag football community. Contreras has also served as a youth coach. In 2024, she coached the Baja California under-16 team at an NFL Flag tournament and led the Dragons Ensenada U13s to an NFL Flag Chargers Regional tournament title. Contreras is also a high school flag football coach, as well as an assistant coach at the CETYS, Ensenada campus.

In November 2022, Contreras was inducted into the Paseo de la Fama de Tijuana Innovadora (Tijuana Innovadora Walk of Fame) following her World Games gold medal. In March 2023, she participated in a "Women in Sports" panel at the second annual Gala del Deporte alongside fellow Mexican sportswomen Jackie Nava and Yazmin Jauregui. Contreras was named a Personality of the Year by El Imparcial in 2024. The following year, she was honored by the Tijuana tourism board for her career and work promoting the sport at the 34th Galardón al Mérito Turístico in Playas de Tijuana.

Contreras featured on the cover of the inaugural issue of Flag Football Nation magazine in January 2024. The magazine described her as "one of the most recognizable names and faces in the sport of women's flag football."

== Bibliography ==
- Gross, Scott (2024). "Flag is Life, Flag is Love" (PDF). Flag Football Nation. No. 1. pp. 8–11 – via Heyzine.
