= Liga Nacional de Futbol Americano Masters =

- Classification: Semi-professional
- Sport: American football
- Founded: 1989
- Founder: José Guzmán Vera; Alejandro Morales Troncoso
- First season: 1990
- Folded: 1996
- No. of teams: 4 (1990–1993); 5 (1994); 6 (1995–1996)
- Country: Mexico
- Headquarters: Mexico City, Mexico
- Most titles: Patriotas; Caballeros Rojos (2 titles each)
- Sponsor: Wilson

The Liga Nacional de Futbol Americano, Categoría Masters (LNF) was a semi-professional American football league in Mexico that played for seven seasons from 1990 to 1996.

The LNF, which successfully attracted many of Mexico's top college football players and coaches, marked a significant step towards professionalism in the country and directly influenced the foundation of the Liga de Fútbol Americano Profesional in 2016. However, a sudden attempt to transition the LNF to fully professional in 1996 led to the demise of the league.

"Masters" category refers to senior or top-level competition, i.e. one level above college football, which is categorized as "Liga Mayor" (Major League).

== History ==
=== Beginnings ===
Despite a long history of college football in Mexico, players who wished to continue playing past their five-year collegiate careers had no opportunities to do so outside of occasional alumni games, leading many to end their careers in their athletic prime. There had been previous attempts at a professional league, namely in the 1950s and 1970s, which did not materialize. In 1987, a four-team Mexico City-based professional league was announced for the following year. However, this planned league did not come to fruition either.

Also in 1987, former college football player José Guzmán Vera played in a "veterans classic" between former Águilas Blancas IPN and Cóndores UNAM players at the Estadio Roberto Tapatío Méndez in Mexico City, during which he realized he still had more left in the tank. From there, he conceived of a "masters" (post-collegiate) league for players who wished to continue their football careers, inviting Alejandro "Canario" Morales to help kickstart the project, among others. Through another colleague, Guzmán Vera was introduced to former NFL player Andy Robustelli, who also supported the project.

The league was officially announced on 12 June 1989, generating significant interest in the latest attempt at a professional league in Mexico, which was seen as more serious and better organized. League organizers hoped for at least four Mexico City teams, though Monterrey was also floated as a potential host city. Wilson was the main sponsor, providing the uniforms and footballs, while Robustelli donated equipment to all four teams. Over 350 players signed up to participate in the inaugural season of the league, of which 200 were selected via a draft held in Mexico City. The four charter member teams, all league-owned and based in Mexico City, were the Caballeros, Conquistadores, Patriotas, and Reales.

=== 1990: Inaugural season ===
The inaugural LNF season kicked off with the Patriotas facing the Caballeros on 3 February 1990. The Patriotas won by a score of 22–20. The head coaches for the inaugural season were Sergio Narváez (Caballeros), Roberto Malpica (Conquistadores), Eduardo Obregón (Patriotas) and Jorge León (Reales). The Patriotas finished the regular season with a 5–1 record, with their only loss being a 30–16 defeat to the Caballeros on 25 February. Caballeros running back Sergio Cuellar led the league in scoring and rushing. The Patriotas clinched sole possession of the top seed with a 37–21 win over the Reales to close the regular season. They faced the second-place Caballeros in the inaugural LNF championship game one week later, with the Patriotas winning. Their head coach, Eduardo "Waldy" Obregón, was named the coach of the year while Reales wide receiver Juan Manuel Montero was named the MVP. After the season, Patriotas kicker Marco Antonio Rueda was signed from the league by the San Antonio Riders of the World League of American Football (WLAF) as part of the Operation Discovery program.

Inaugural season standings
	GP	W	L	Head coach
x-Patriotas	6	5	1	Eduardo Obregón
x-Caballeros	6	4	2	Sergio Narváez
Conquistadores	6	2	4	Roberto Malpica
Reales	6	1	5	Jorge León

=== 1991 to 1994 ===
Ahead of the 1991 season, the Reales made the first coaching change in league history, replacing Jorge León with Fernando Larios. Additionally, Alejandro "Canario" Morales took over for José Guzmán Vera as league commissioner. In the 1991 championship game, the Reales beat the Caballeros, 13–10, thanks to a 21-yard field goal (Note: Other sources say 22 yards.) from Raúl de la Rosa in overtime. Running back José Luis Martínez Macías was named the game's MVP. Despite a 45-man game-day roster limit, the Reales activated 67 players for the game; the league's failure to enforce its own rules drew criticism from journalist Raymundo Camargo of Ovaciones. In 1992, the Centinelas del Cuerpo de Guardias Presidenciales took over administration of the Conquistadores and named Billy Mickle as the new head coach. Additionally, the Caballeros were taken over by the Labastida Islas brothers, who named Pedo Casas as the new head coach. By 1993, all four teams were independent entities with their own owners. The Caballeros Rojos won back-to-back championships in 1992 and 1993.

The LNF welcomed its first expansion team, the Cerveceros de Monterrey, in 1994, extending the league's reach to northern Mexico. The team, owned by Antonio Fuentes and coached by Mike Cervantes, was sponsored by the Cuauhtémoc Moctezuma Brewery. Monterrey inaugurated the 1994 season with a 16–7 win over the Patriotas in front of a home crowd of about 10,000; the first score in Cerveceros history was a 55-yard touchdown pass from Andrés Cantú to Benjamín Corripio in the second quarter. Also that year, former Dallas Cowboys kicker Rafael Septién came out of retirement to sign with the Caballeros. In the punultimate week of the regular season, the Conquistadores beat the Cerveceros in Monterrey, 31–30, to clinch a berth in the championship game. Ultimately, the Patriotas beat the Conquistadores, 27–20, in the championship game at the Olympic Velodrome.

=== 1995 to 1996: Final years ===
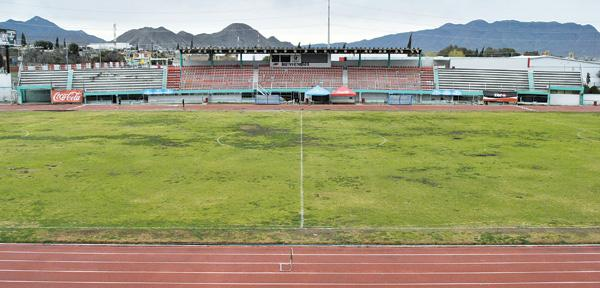
Estadio Olímpico de Saltillo, home of the Dinosaurios

After several months of discussions, the LNF awarded an expansion team bid to the northern city of Saltillo, Coahuila, in November 1994, at which time there were 110 local players training to make the team. The team name was announced on 20 December as the Dinosaurios de Saltillo, joining the Cerveceros as the second northern expansion team. The project was undertaken by Carlos Ayala Espinosa, Víctor Manuel "Heisman" Pérez Ocampo, Cayetano Garza and Carlos “El Yeti” Torres, among others. The Dinosaurios hired Borregos Salvajes Monterrey head coach Frank González – then considered the best college coach in the country – who recruited assistant coaches and former players from the best programs in Saltillo and nearby Monterrey, thus bringing together much of the top talent from northern Mexico.

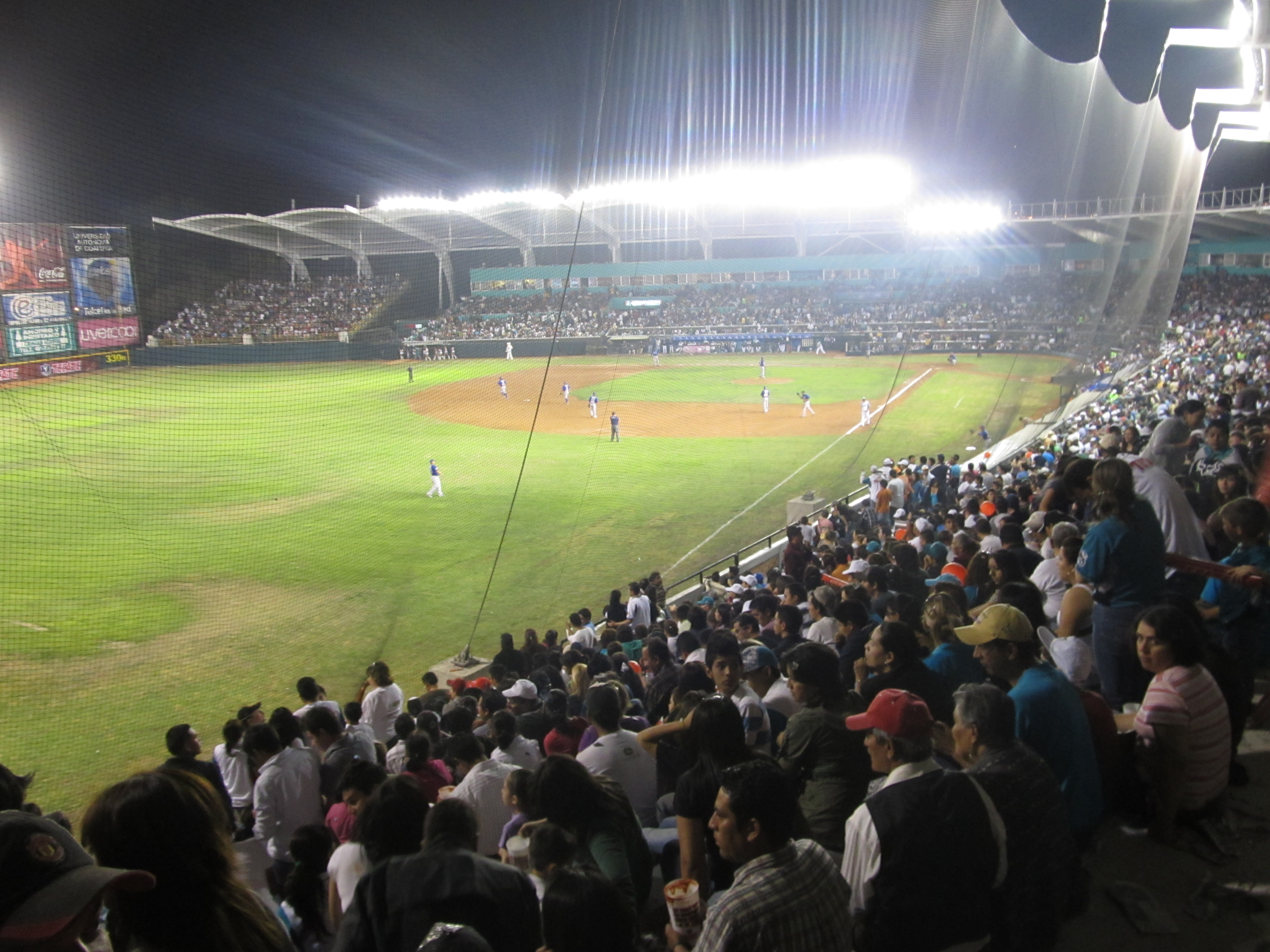
Estadio Francisco I. Madero, other home of the Dinosaurios

The Dinosaurios de Saltillo made their debut on 30 April 1995, hosting the Corpus Christi Karankawas of the Texas Professional Spring Football League (TPSFL) in a tune-up game at the Estadio Olímpico de Saltillo. The Dinosaurios won 40–35, handing the Karankawas their first loss of the season. (Note: Despite it being a tune-up game for the Dinosaurios, the loss was counted as a non-conference game for the Karankawas.) The following week, Saltillo beat the Reales, 45–7, in their first official LNF game. The Dinosaurios remained undefeated until the regular season finale, where they suffered a 27–24 loss to the Patriotas in front of 4,000 fans at the Estadio Olímpico de Saltillo. The Patriotas finished third in the league standings. Patriotas quarterback Alejandro Morales led the league in passing during the regular season, completing 164-of-252 pass attempts for 1,883 yards and 20 touchdowns. Meanwhile, Dinosaurios quarterback Jaime Urquidi passed for 1,504 yards and 17 touchdowns. In the championship game, the Dinosaurios were pitted against the Cerveceros de Monterrey, who had beaten the Conquistadores 34–28 in their regular season finale thanks to three touchdown passes from Andrés Cantú to Rogelio Alvarado. The Cerveceros beat the Dinosaurios, 20–17, in a dramatic championship game featuring both Northern expansion teams at the Estadio Francisco I. Madero in Saltillo.

1995 season standings
	GP	W	L	PF	PA
x-Dinosaurios de Saltillo	10	8	2	265	157
x-Cerveceros de Monterrey	10	7	3	239	120
Patriotas	10	6	4	279	165
Caballeros	10	5	5	219	146
Conquistadores	10	4	6	185	242
Reales	10	0	10	77	431

On 14 July 1996, the Dinosaurios de Saltillo defeated the Caballeros Rojos, 29–28, in the championship game at the Estadio Olímpico de Saltillo in front of 6,500 spectators. The team was wildly popular and "Dinomanía" became a local sensation, with the victory having a lasting impact on sports in Saltillo, which had never won national championship in any team sport before. The Dinosaurios also received extensive media coverage, with local newspapers devoting entire pages to game reports. There was also a weekly television program and two weekly radio shows dedicated to the team. In a testament to the community's institutional support, Dinosaurios tickets could be used to gain free admission to Saraperos de Saltillo baseball games.

The 1996 season was fraught with controversies surrounding Reales team owner Alejandro Morales. Following a Centinelas–Reales game, multiple Reales coaches resigned due to unpaid wages, with offensive coordinator Sergio Gómez calling Morales a fraudster. A few days later, Morales told the media that any coach who claimed they were not paid on time was "shamelessly lying" and instead cited disagreements over team management as the reason for their departure. Another game between the Patriotas and Reales on 1 June was suspended due to continuous offenses committed by Reales players and fans against the referees. An extensive discussion ensued, during which referee Adolfo Contreras denounced: "Besides, Alejandro Morales hasn't paid us in three weeks." Further questions soon arose surrounding his apparent conflict of interest.

=== Attempt at professionalism and demise ===
For most of its existence, the LNF operated as a semi-professional league. Players were to be paid via sponsorships acquired by the teams, but in reality, they were rarely paid a regular salary. The original purpose of the league, as stated by its founders, was to promote the growth of the sport throughout the country, and it was thus run as an Asociación Civil (non-profit organization). Carlos Ayala Espinosa, who served as the fourth and final LNF commissioner, attempted to transition the LNF into a fully professional league in 1996. He told a group of reporters that he would change its legal status to a for-profit Sociedad Anónima and announced the introduction of a minimum player salary: MXN$500. Ayala Espinosa also mentioned forthcoming expansion teams in Puebla, Querétaro, San Luis Potosí, Torreón, and even the United States.

However, while the existing northern expansion teams (Cerveceros and Dinosaurios) had been successful in securing local sponsorship deals, the Mexico City teams struggled to do the same. They didn't draw the same attendance figures either, with one journalist describing the Mexico City teams' attendance figures as "rickety" in 1995. A Conquistadores vs. Patriotas matchup, considered "the best game of the first half of the 1994 season", only drew some 1,500 fans at the Olympic Velodrome. One team in particular, the Reales, was said to have been "sentenced to... being the league's ugly duckling for a third consecutive year" after winning just one game per season in 1993 and 1994 and continuing their struggles into 1995.

In early 1997, it was reported in Ovaciones that most of the players were uncertain about the future of the league, which had yet to confirm if a season would even be held that year. Despite players from all four Mexico City teams working together to seek sponsorships, team owners indicated that they did not wish to continue spending money for an eighth season. The newspaper also accused league commissioner and Dinosarious owner Carlos Ayala of prioritizing his team's success over the interests of the LNF, which led to mismanagement of the league. The 1997 season was not played and the LNF folded.

== Teams and venues ==
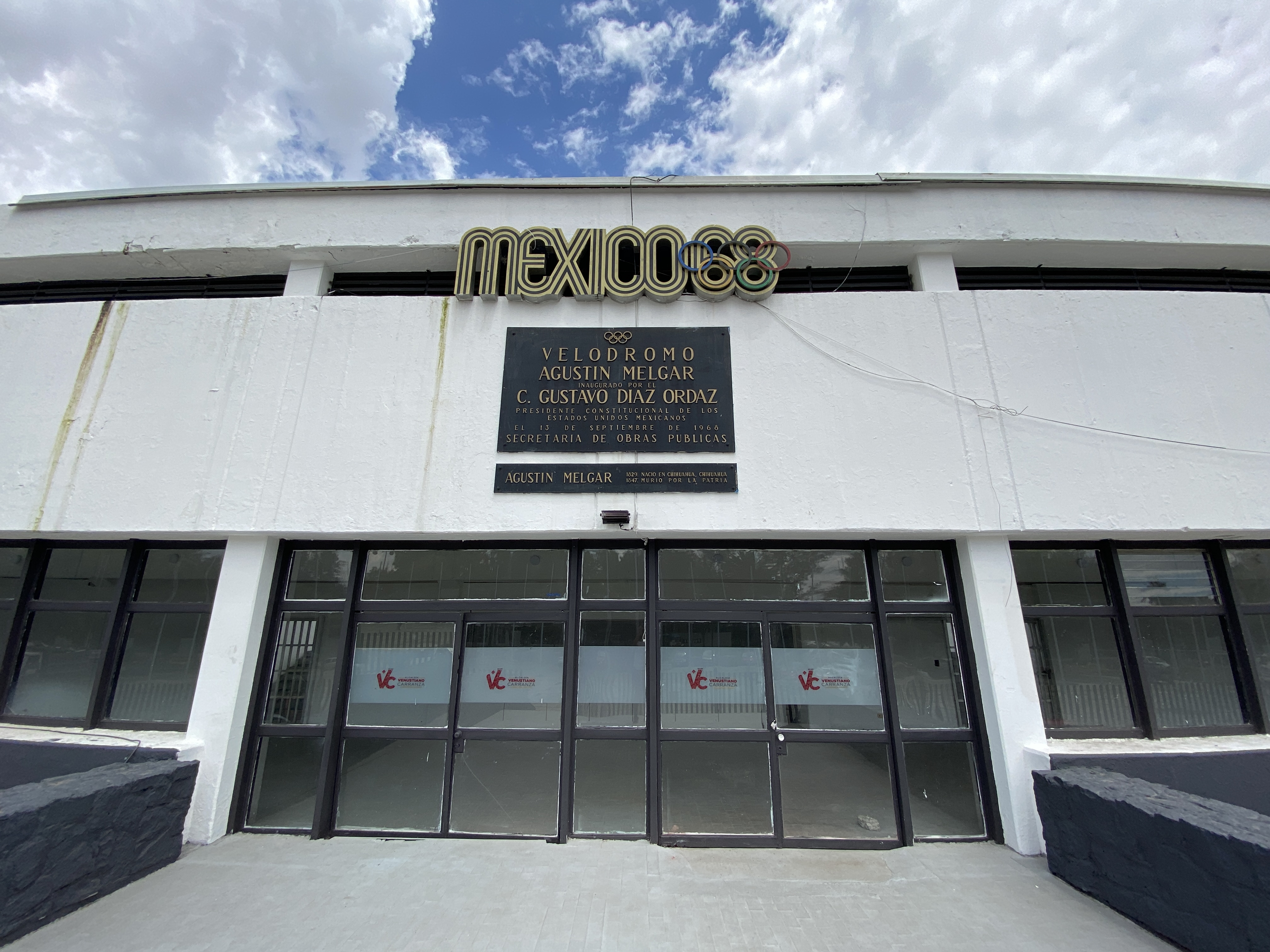
The Agustín Melgar Olympic Velodrome was one of the first venues used

- Caballeros Rojos (de Toluca) (1990–1996)
- Cerveceros de Monterrey (1994–1996)
- Conquistadores / Centinelas (1990–1996)
- Dinosaurios de Saltillo (1995–1996)
- Patriotas (1990–1996)
- Reales (del Sur) (1990–1996)

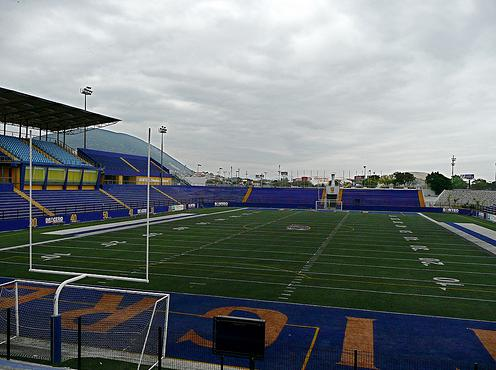
Estadio Gaspar Mass, home of the Cerveceros

Initially, all games were played at the Estadio General Joaquín Amaro in Mexico City. Subsequently, the Agustín Melgar Olympic Velodrome and the Perros Negros de Naucalpan field were used as well. However, cyclists accused the football players of damaging the tracks at the Velodrome, forcing the teams to find their own venues. The Conquistadores remained at the Estadio General Joaquín Amaro. Meanwhile, the Caballeros moved to the Prepa 1 UAEM field in Toluca, the Conquistadores chose the Gamos, Asociación Civil field in Xochimilco, and the Patriotas settled in the Estadio Manuel Rodero in Ciudad Satélite.

As for the expansion teams, the Dinosaurios de Saltillo played at both the Estadio Olímpico de Saltillo and Estadio Francisco I. Madero, while the Cerveceros de Monterrey played their home games at the Estadio Gaspar Mass.

== Rules ==
Legendary referee Felipe García de la Vega served as the head of the league's referees committee. The LNF was played under professional rules, which were personally translated by García de la Vega. After every touchdown scored, teams were allowed to go for an extra point kick or a two-point conversion. Additionally, games were not allowed to end in ties.

The LNF season was played at different times throughout its history, starting with a winter schedule which clashed with the NFL playoffs. Later on, the season was pushed back slightly, although it still coincided with the intermedia season (akin to college freshman or JV), with most fans preferring to attend the more traditional college games. Finally, during its final years, the LNF played a spring schedule. The season was played in a double round-robin format, with each team playing each other twice and the top two teams advancing to the championship game, the Super Tazón Masters.

== Notable people and achievements ==
The 1990 LNF most valuable player (MVP) was Reales wide receiver Juan Manuel Montero. The other award winners in 1990 were running back José Ángel Barragán as offensive player of the year and defensive lineman Francisco Velázquez as defensive player of the year. Juan Manuel Montero and running back Héctor Didius Brutus were each two-time league MVPs.

Dinosaurios de Saltillo kicker Alberto Vázquez García converted on a 66-yard field goal in a game in Toluca, setting the Mexican national record, which still stands as of 2025.

=== LNF alumni who played in the NFL ===
- Rafael Septién, K – Caballeros 1994

=== Members of the Salón de la Fama del Futbol Americano de México ===
Several LNF alumni are enshrined in the Salón de la Fama del Futbol Americano de México (Mexican Hall of Fame of American Football):

- Frank González (coach) – Dinosaurios 1995–1996
- Juan Manuel Alcocer Perkins, S – Patriotas 1990
- Roberto Aparicio, C – Reales 1995–1996
- Alejandro Carpinteyro, WR/TE/DE – Reales 1993–1995
- Víctor Clavel, WR – Reales 1992
- Benajamín Corripio
- Mario Garza, T – Dinosaurios (1996)
- Eduardo "Zeus" González, QB – Conquistadores
- Eloy Gutiérrez, LB – Caballeros 1994–1996
- Didier Héctor Brutus, RB – Caballeros 1990–1994
- René Lozano, LB – Dinosaurios 1995–1996
- Fernando Manjarrez, DE – Patriotas 1990, Caballeros 1991
- Miguel Ángel Montes, DT – Patriotas 1990–1991
- José Antonio Moreno, RB
- Antonio Paniagua, DT – Reales 1991
- Silverio Pérez, S/K – Dinosaurios 1996
- Sergio Rosendo, DE – Reales 1994
- Marco Antonio Rueda, K – Patriotas 1990, 1994–1995
- Ramiro Sagrero, OT – Reales 1992, Patriotas 1993–1995
- Roberto Soriano, DE – Caballeros 1990–1991 (Note: Source incorrectly states he played for the Conquistadores.)
- Armando Tahuilan, T – Patriotas
- Jaime Urquidi, QB – Dinosaurios 1995–1996
- Ricardo Vela, RB – Cerveceros 1993?
- Francisco Velázquez, DT – Caballeros 1990
- Edgar Zapata, QB
- Enrique Zapata, QB

=== Commissioners ===
- José Guzmán Vera
- Alejandro Morales
- Héctor "Troni" López
- Carlos Ayala Espinoza

== Legacy ==
The LNF laid the groundwork for professionalism in Mexico and is considered a predecessor to the modern Liga de Fútbol Americano Profesional (LFA). Longtime journalist and LFA founder Juan Carlos Vázquez, who grew up during the peak of the league's popularity, wrote his MBA thesis on the LNF and the viability of football leagues outside of the U.S. In a 2017 ESPN feature story on the then-fledgling LFA, he said:

When I was a kid, I was a fanatic for the [Liga Master]. It hurt a lot when the league folded, and since then I've thought about creating one.

The Dinos de Saltillo, an LFA expansion team founded in 2017, were named after the original Dinosaurios franchise, even using the same Stegosaurus in its logo. Head coach Javier Adame was a fan of the Dinosaurios in the 1990s, telling Récord that every home game was a "party". The reincarnated Dinos honored a group of players from the original Dinosaurios team during halftime of their inaugural game on 18 February 2017, which also marked the kickoff of the 2017 LFA season. Several Dinos players were the sons of former Dinosaurios players, such as linebacker Daniel Carrete, son of Dinosaurios quarterback Javier Carrete.

On 14 July 2025, former Cerveceros de Monterrey players were honored by the Osos de Monterrey during a game against the Caudillos de Chihuahua. Later that month, a group of former Dinosaurios players reunited in Saltillo to celebrate the 30th anniversary of the team's founding.

== Champions ==
Season	Champion	Score	Runner-up	Site	Ref.
1990	Patriotas	24–14	Caballeros Rojos	Estadio Joaquín Amaro	
1991	Reales	13–10^{OT}	Caballeros Rojos	Estadio Joaquín Amaro	
1992	Caballeros Rojos	27–26	Patriotas		
1993	Caballeros Rojos	10–7	Patriotas		
1994	Patriotas	27–20	Conquistadores	Olympic Velodrome	
1995	Cerveceros de Monterrey	20–17	Dinosaurios de Saltillo	Estadio Francisco I. Madero	
1996	Dinosaurios de Saltillo	29–28	Caballeros	Estadio Olímpico de Saltillo	

== Bibliography ==
- Fernández de Lara Quezada, Alberto (1997). Un siglo de futbol americano en México (1896-1996). Relevancia del juego desde la perspectiva social (PDF) (Licentiate thesis) (in Spanish). National Autonomous University of Mexico.
- Iglesias Cervantes, Jorge (March 2021). "Masters LNF: unos de los grandes esfuerzos por tener una liga profesional en México". Red Zone. 4 (in Spanish). No. 3. pp. 6–9.
