= Gerardo Álvarez =

Mexican gridiron football player (born 1988)

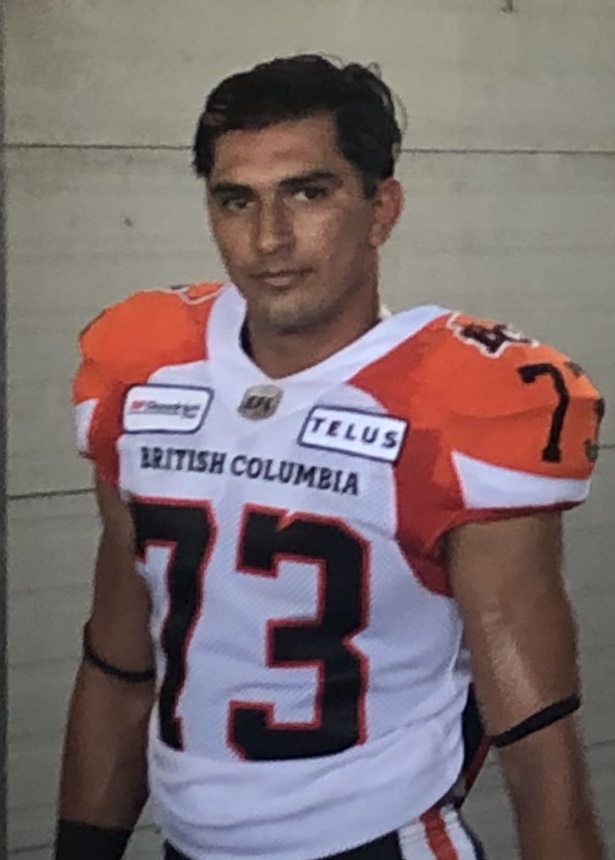
- Álvarez in 2019

No. 3 – Dinos de Saltillo
- Position: Wide receiver
- Roster status: Active
- CFL status: National

Personal information
- Born: 15 September 1988 (age 38); Mexico
- Listed height: 5 ft 9 in (1.75 m)
- Listed weight: 170 lb (77 kg)

Career information
- College: UAdeC (2006–2010)
- CFL draft: 2019 LFA: 3rd round, 25th overall pick

Career history
- Dinos de Saltillo (2017–2019); BC Lions (2019–2020); Dinos de Saltillo (2020–present)

Awards and highlights
- ONEFA Northern Conference championship (2009); LFA Best receiver (2017)
- Stats at CFL.ca

Gerardo Álvarez
Medal record

Men's Flag football

Representing Mexico

Flag Football World Championship
Silver medal – second place	2014 Grosseto	Team

Gerardo Elías Álvarez Ovalle (born 15 September 1988) is a Mexican professional gridiron football wide receiver for the Dinos de Saltillo of the Liga de Fútbol Americano Profesional (LFA). Álvarez played college football at UAdeC and previously played in the Canadian Football League (CFL) with the BC Lions.

== Early career ==
Álvarez played American football since he was a kid, where he earned the nickname "Pewee" for his small and thin complexion. Despite this, he was invited by several college football programs to join their teams. Álvarez chose the Lobos of the Autonomous University of Coahuila, where he played from 2006 to 2010, also majoring in Civil engineering.

Álvarez became one of the top players of the ONEFA's Northern Conference and was fundamental part of the 2009 Lobos UAdeC team that won that year's championship after defeating Águilas UACH 31–24 in the final.

After finishing his college football eligibility in 2010, Álvarez played flag football and was part of the Mexican national team that won the silver medal at the 2014 IFAF Flag Football World Championship.

== Professional career ==
=== Dinos de Saltillo ===
In 2016, Álvarez was one of the first players to be signed by the Dinos de Saltillo of the Liga de Fútbol Americano Profesional (LFA), Mexico's top American football league, ahead of the 2017 LFA season, Dinos' debut season in the league.

In 2017, Álvarez helped the Dinos to reach the Tazón México II, LFA's championship game, in the team's maiden season. Dinos lost the game 18–24 against Mayas CDMX and Álvarez scored one touchdown. Álvarez was awarded as the 2017 LFA's best receiver.

In 2018, Álvarez established a new LFA record for most touchdowns in a single match, in a game against rivals Fundidores de Monterrey, scoring four touchdowns.

=== BC Lions ===
Álvarez was selected by the BC Lions as the 25th pick of the third round of the 2019 CFL–LFA draft. Álvarez joined the BC Lions, alongside fellow countryman Fernando Richarte.

Álvarez was signed to the practice roster and made his CFL debut on 15 June 2019 against the Winnipeg Blue Bombers.

Álvarez remained on the Lions' roster but returned to Mexico to play the 2020 LFA season with the Dinos, but the season was cancelled due to the COVID-19 pandemic.

Álvarez was re-signed by the Lions for the 2020 CFL season, but the season was not played due to the COVID-19 pandemic.

=== Return to Mexico ===
After being released by the BC Lions, Álvarez has played for the Dinos de Saltillo.

After sitting out in 2025, he returned for 2026.
