= Martos (disambiguation) =

Martos is a city in Spain. Martos may also refer to

- Martos CD, a Spanish football club based in Martos
- Fuensanta de Martos, another city in Spain
- Martovce (Martos), a village in southern Slovakia
- Martos (surname)
