= Martos (surname) =

Martos is a Spanish, Hungarian or Ukrainian surname that may refer to

- Antonio Martos (cyclist) (born 1946), Spanish racing cyclist
- Antonio Martos Ortiz (born 1981), Spanish singer
- Borys Martos (1879–1977), Ukrainian politician, pedagogue and economist
- Cristino Martos y Balbí (1830–1893), Spanish politician and lawyer
- Francisco Martos (born 1984), Spanish football player
- György Martos (born 1943), Hungarian speed skater
- Győző Martos (born 1949), Hungarian football player
- Ivan Martos (1754–1835), Russian-Ukrainian sculptor and art teacher
- Iván Martos (born 1997), Spanish football player
- Javi Martos (born 1984). Spanish football player
- Juan Martos (born 1939), Spanish basketball player
- Marco Martos (disambiguation)
- Mario Martos (born 1991), Spanish football player
- Mihály Martos (born 1945), Hungarian speed skater
- Rafael Manzano Martos (born 1936), Spanish architect
- Sebastián Martos (born 1989), Spanish runner
- Walter Martos (1957–2025), Peruvian military general and politician

== See also ==
- Marto
