= Marto =

Marto may refer to the following people:

Given name

- Marto Gracias (died 2016), Indian football player

Surname

- António Marto (born 1947), Portuguese prelate
- Jacinta and Francisco Marto, (1908–1919, 1910–1920), Portuguese child visionaries, canonized as saints in 2017

== See also ==
- Martos (surname)
