= 2021 LFA season =

- Duration: Canceled

Seasons
- ← 2020 2022 →

The 2021 LFA season would have been the sixth season of the Liga de Fútbol Americano Profesional (LFA), the top American football league in Mexico. Initially, the regular season was scheduled to begin in March 2021. However, the kickoff date was pushed back three months, due to the ongoing COVID-19 pandemic, with the season intended to start on 4 June 2021.

In April 2021, however, the league confirmed the cancelation of the 2021 season due to the pandemic, stating that it would be almost impossible to play from June to September and then again start the next season in February 2022, thus, choosing not to play the 2021 season.

== Preseason events ==
=== Coaching changes ===
- Artilleros: After coaching the team for two seasons, Gustavo Torres left the Artilleros.
- Osos: Michel Esquivel replaced Horacio García as head coach of the team. García previously coached the Osos in their two seasons as an American football franchise; García left to led the Pumas Acatlán varsity football team.
- Pioneros: Ricardo Cuanalo replaced Rassiel López as head coach of the team. López was promoted to general manager.

=== Team changes ===
Two teams left the league on February before the beginning of the season: Artilleros de Puebla and Pioneros de Querétaro.

== Teams ==
Team	City	Stadium	Capacity	Head coach
North Division
Dinos	Saltillo, Coahuila	Estadio Olímpico Francisco I. Madero	8,000	(Mexico) Javier Adame
Fundidores	Monterrey, Nuevo León	Estadio Borregos	10,057	(Mexico) Carlos Strevel
Raptors	Naucalpan, State of Mexico	Estadio José Ortega Martínez	3,700	(Mexico) Guillermo Gutiérrez
Central Division
Condors	Mexico City	Estadio ITESM Santa Fe	2,500	(Mexico) Félix Buendía
Mexicas	Mexico City	Estadio Perros Negros	2,500	(Mexico) Héctor Toxqui
Osos	Toluca, State of Mexico	Estadio Fortaleza Siglo XXI	4,000	(Mexico) Michel Esquivel
