= Estadio Templo del Dolor =

Stadium in Cholula, Puebla, Mexico

Templo del Dolor
- Interactive map of Templo del Dolor
- Location: San Andrés Cholula, Puebla, Mexico
- Coordinates: 19°03′18.4″N 98°17′06.4″W
- Owner: Universidad de las Américas Puebla
- Capacity: 4,500
- Surface: Grass

Construction
- Opened: 1990

Tenants
- Aztecas UDLAP (ONEFA) (1990–present); Artilleros Puebla (LFA) (2019)

Estadio Templo del Dolor (Temple of Pain Stadium) is a stadium in Cholula, Puebla, Mexico. It is primarily used for American football and is the home field of the Aztecas UDLAP. It holds 4,500 people.

Artilleros Puebla from Liga de Fútbol Americano Profesional (LFA), Mexico's top American football league, also played their home games at the Templo del Dolor for the 2019 season.
