= Artilleros de Puebla =

Mexican American football team

- Logo
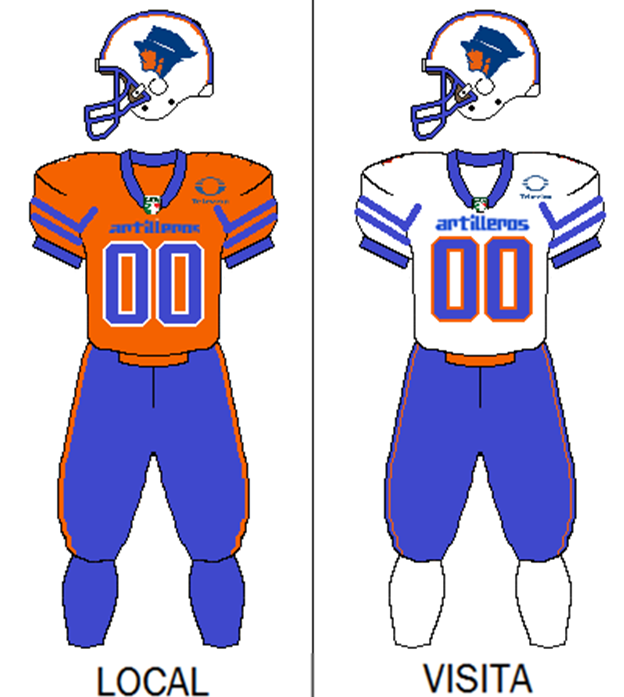
- Uniforms

General information
- Founded: 17 August 2018; 7 years ago
- Folded: 2021; 5 years ago
- Stadium: Estadio Universitario BUAP
- Headquartered: Puebla, Puebla, Mexico
- Colors: Orange, blue, white
- Mascot: Nacho

Personnel
- General manager: David Vera
- Head coach: Gustavo Torres

League / conference affiliations
- Liga de Fútbol Americano Profesional; 2019–2020; Central Division

Artilleros de Puebla (English: Puebla Artillerymen) were a Mexican professional American football team based in the city of Puebla, Puebla. The Artilleros competed in the Central Division of the Liga de Fútbol Americano Profesional, the top American football league in Mexico. The team played its home games at the Estadio Universitario BUAP. During its existence, the team never made it to playoffs.

== History ==
The team was founded on 17 August 2018, as the first team of the 2019 Liga de Fútbol Americano Profesional expansion (the other being the Osos), and the seventh team overall in the LFA.

The name of the team is a tribute to the patriots that defeated the army of the Second French Empire at the Battle of Puebla in 1862. Artilleros is the Spanish word for artillerymen.

On their first season, Artilleros debuted with a victory against the 2018 champions, Mexicas. Despite finishing the season with 5–3 record, the team was unable to qualify for the playoffs after losing their last game of the season against Mayas 20–25.

The team folded in February 2021 prior to the beginning of the 2021 LFA season.

== Stadiums ==
Artilleros Puebla stadiums
Stadium	Tenure
Estadio Templo del Dolor	2019
Estadio Universitario BUAP	2020

During their first season, the Artilleros played their home games at Estadio Templo del Dolor, located in San Andrés Cholula within the Universidad de las Américas Puebla campus. The stadium had a capacity of 4,500 spectators and it was normally used by the UDLAP's college football team: the Aztecas.

In 2020, Artilleros moved from the Templo del Dolor to the Estadio Universitario BUAP, with a larger capacity of 19,283 seated spectators. The stadium, originally built from 1997–1999, was renovated in 2012 and used to host Lobos BUAP Liga MX matches until 2019, when the club was dissolved.

== Season-by-season ==
Season	Head coach	Regular season				Postseason			
Season	Head coach	Won	Lost	Win %	Finish	Won	Lost	Win %	Result
2019	Gustavo Torres	5	3	.625	3rd (Central)	–	–	–	–
2020	Gustavo Torres	2	3	.400	3rd (Central)	Season cancelled			
Total		7	6	.538		–	–	–	

== Mascot ==
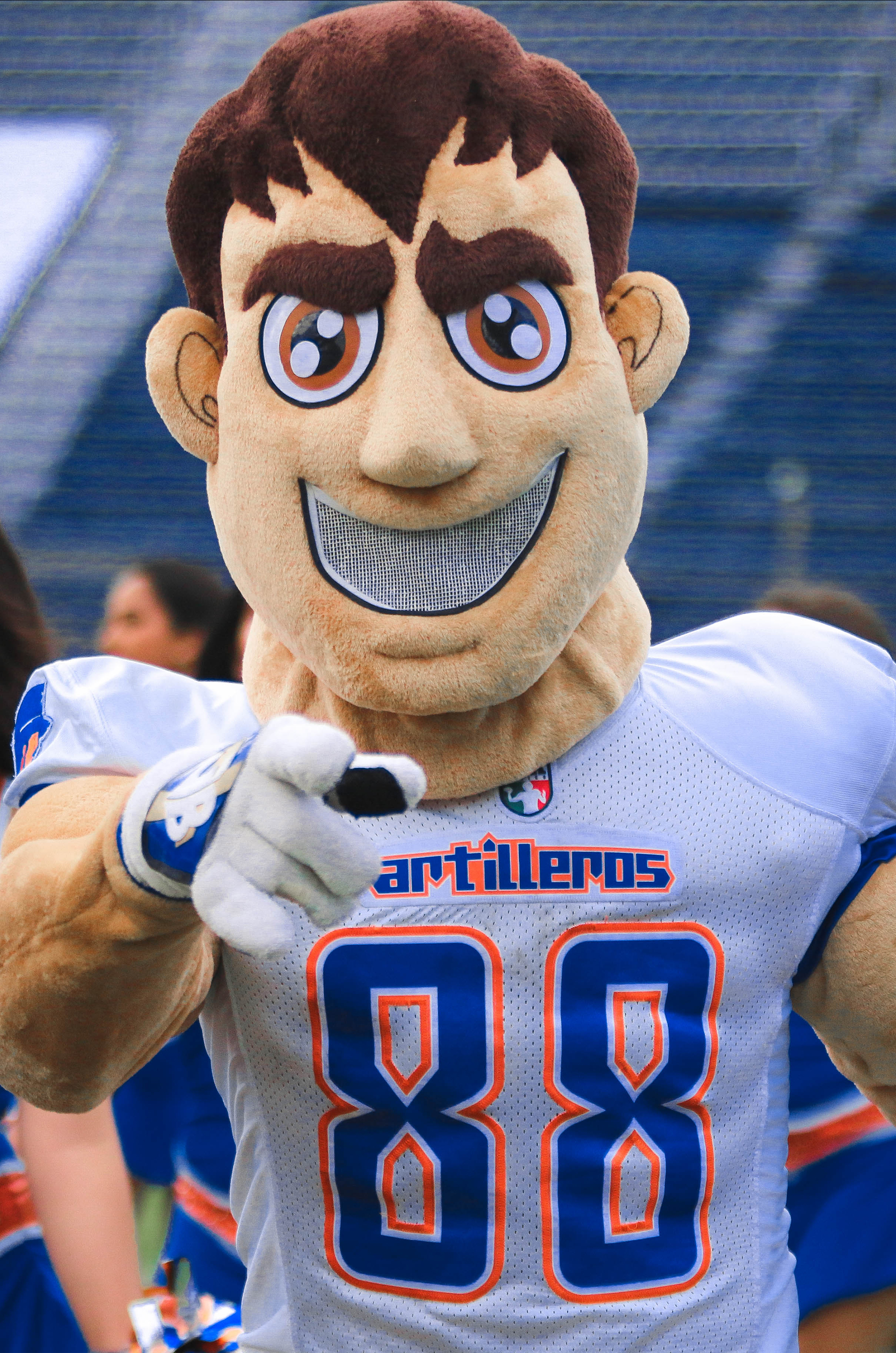
Nacho

The team's mascot is Nacho, a Mexican army general from the times of the Second French intervention in Mexico. The name Nacho is a nickname for Ignacio. Thus, the mascot's name is most likely inspired by Ignacio Zaragoza, the general who led the Mexican Army that defeated invading French forces at the Battle of Puebla on May 5, 1862.

Nacho was first introduced in the first game of the 2019 season, against the Mexicas. Since, Nacho makes appearances at every Artilleros' home game at the Estadio Templo del Dolor.

== Notable players ==
See Category:Artilleros de Puebla players
