= Estadio Universitario BUAP =

Multi-purpose stadium in Puebla, Mexico

Coordinates: 18°59′50″N 98°11′51″W

- Interactive map of Estadio Universitario BUAP
- Location: Puebla, Puebla
- Owner: BUAP
- Operator: Lobos BUAP
- Capacity: 19,283
- Surface: Grass
- Field size: 105 x 68 m

Construction
- Groundbreaking: 1990
- Opened: 1992
- Expanded: 13 January 2012

Tenants
- Lobos BUAP (Liga MX) (1999–2007, 2012–2019)Artilleros de Puebla (LFA) (2020); Club Puebla (Liga MX) (2014-2015)

Estadio Universitario BUAP (official name) is a multi-purpose stadium located in Ciudad Universitaria in Puebla, Puebla, Mexico. It was used by the Lobos BUAP professional football team, who played in the Liga MX, the top flight of Mexican football, from 2017 to 2019.

== History ==
The first stage of the stadium opened in 1999 and was used by Lobos de la BUAP, a professional football club that plays in the Ascenso MX. In 2007, the club moved because it did not meet the requirements of the Mexican Football Federation for an Ascenso MX home grounds; namely, it required expansion from 9,000 to at least 15,000 seats.

After three and a half years in the Estadio Cuauhtémoc, Lobos returned to the Estadio Universitario on February 26, 2012 after it was expanded to hold more than 20,000.

In 2017, Lobos were promoted to Liga MX, and as the venue seats more than the 20,000 minimum for a first-division football stadium, no expansion was necessary, even though the Estadio Universitario BUAP is the smallest stadium in the league.

Prior to Lobos' promotion to Liga MX, some top-flight teams had used the stadium due to special events and renovations. Veracruz played the final two home games of the Apertura 2014 tournament in the Estadio Universitario BUAP, as the Estadio Luis "Pirata" Fuente was being used to host the 2014 Central American and Caribbean Games. Puebla played both 2015 tournaments in the Estadio Universitario BUAP, as the Estadio Cuauhtémoc was being remodeled.

In 2020, Artilleros de Puebla from the Liga de Fútbol Americano Profesional, the top American football league in Mexico, moved to the stadium.
