= Osos de Toluca =

Mexican American football team

- Logo
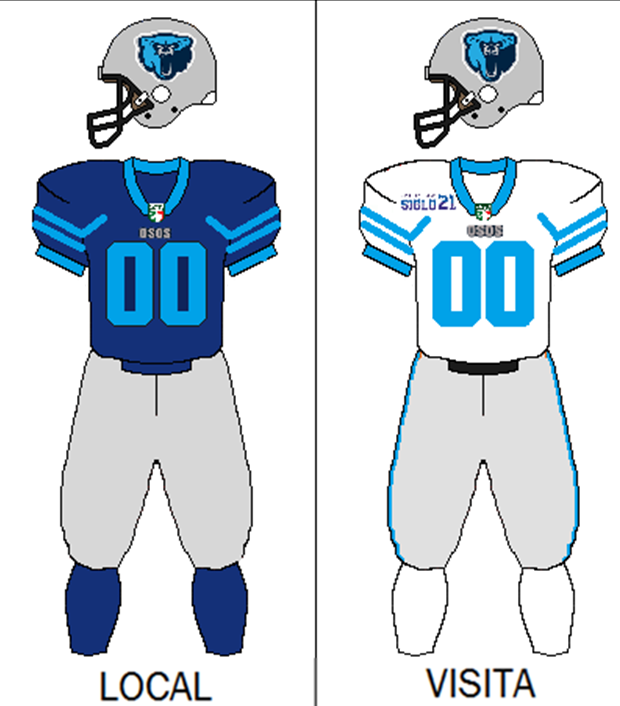
- Uniforms

General information
- Founded: 4 September 2018; 7 years ago
- Folded: 2022
- Stadium: Universidad Siglo XXI
- Headquartered: Toluca, State of Mexico, Mexico
- Colours: Navy, silver, sky blue, white

Personnel
- Head coach: Michel Esquivel

Nickname
- Tolucosos

League / conference affiliations
- Liga de Fútbol Americano Profesional; 2019–2021; Central Division

Osos de Toluca (English: Toluca Bears) were an American football team based in Toluca, Mexico. The Osos competed in the Central Division of the Liga de Fútbol Americano Profesional, the top American football league in Mexico. During its existence, the team never made it to playoffs.

== History ==
The team was founded on 4 September 2018, as the second team of the 2019 Liga de Fútbol Americano Profesional expansion (the other being the Artilleros), and the eight team overall in the LFA.

The name of the team refers to the mexican grizzly bear, today extinct. As a curious fact, Toluca already had two sports teams with the name of Osos (Spanish for "bears"): a baseball team, Osos Negros de Toluca (Toluca Black Bears) and a football team, Osos Grises (Gray Bears); both teams are now defunct.

On 17 September 2018, Horacio García Aponte, college national champion in 2017 with Borregos Salvajes Toluca, was named head coach of the team.

In their debut season, the team won only two games, finishing the regular season with a 2–6 record and as the last overall classified team.

In July 2020, head coach Horacio García left the team.

The team folded in January 2022, prior to the beginning of the 2022 LFA season.

== Stadium ==
The Osos played their home games at the Universidad Siglo XXI. The university's field was conditioned with stands so it could seat 4,000 people.

== Season-by-season ==
Season	Head coach	Regular season				Postseason			
Season	Head coach	Won	Lost	Win %	Finish	Won	Lost	Win %	Result
2019	Horacio García	2	6	.250	4th (North)	–	–	–	–
2020	Horacio García	1	4	.200	4th (Central)	Post season not held			
2021	Season cancelled due to the COVID-19 pandemic								
Total		3	10	.230		–	–	–	

== Notable players ==
See Category:Osos de Toluca players
