= 2020 LFA season =

- Duration: 8 February 2020 – 8 March 2020

~~Tazón México V~~
- Date: Not held
- Venue: Estadio Azteca, Mexico City

Seasons
- 2019 ~~2021~~

The 2020 LFA season was the fifth season of the Liga de Fútbol Americano Profesional (LFA), the top American football league in Mexico. The regular season began on February 8 and was to conclude on April 26, with the playoffs beginning on May 1 and ending with the Tazón México V on May 17. Nevertheless, after week 5, on March 16, the LFA announced the suspension of the 2020 season due to the COVID-19 pandemic and on 29 March 2020 the league confirmed that the season was cancelled.

== Preseason events ==
=== Expansion and stadium changes ===
One new team joined the league: Pioneros, based in Querétaro City. Due to Pioneros joining the LFA and the league failing to secure a tenth expansion team, thus raising the number of teams to nine, the LFA took the decision that the Mayas would not participate in the season, returning in 2021. This decision was also made taking in consideration the change of ownership in the team.

Four teams switched stadiums:

- Artilleros, previously playing at Estadio Templo del Dolor (with capacity of 4,500 spectators), moved to the Estadio Universitario BUAP, that can accommodate 19,283 spectators. The stadium, originally built from 1997 to 1999, was renovated in 2012 and used to host Lobos BUAP, Liga MX matches until 2019, when the club was dissolved.
- Fundidores moved to Estadio Borregos, with a capacity of 10,057 spectators. The stadium is owned by the Monterrey Institute of Technology and Higher Education and it is used by college football team Borregos Salvajes Monterrey. Before, Fundidores played at the Estadio Nuevo León Unido, that could only accommodate 1,500 people.
- Mexicas, formerly playing at Casco de Santo Tomás Field (with capacity of 2,000 spectators), moved to the Estadio Perros Negros in Naucalpan. The stadium can accommodate 2,500 spectators.
- Raptors, previously playing at FES Acatlán (with capacity of 2,500 spectators), moved to the Estadio José Ortega Martínez, with a capacity of 3,700 seated spectators. The team already played at the stadium during the 2018 season.

=== Coaching changes ===
- Fundidores: Carlos Strevel replaced Israel González as head coach of the team. González previously coached the team for two seasons (2018 and 2019) reaching playoffs once.
- Mexicas: Héctor Toxqui was chosen to replace Enrique Zárate as head coach of the team. As of the 2020 season, Mexicas is the only team in the league to have had a different coach for each one of its five seasons.

=== Draft ===
The 2020 draft was the largest so far, declaring more than 70 senior players from ONEFA, CONADEIP and FADEMAC for the first time. The draft was held on January 11 at the FES Acatlán facilities.

Draft 2020
Rd	Sel.	LFA Team	Player	Pos.	University	Conf.
SP	1	Pioneros	José Pablo Morales	DB	Borregos ITESM Querétaro	Liga Mayor ONEFA
SP	2	Condors	César Pérez Durán	DL	Águilas Blancas IPN	Liga Mayor ONEFA
1	1	Pioneros	Edgar Padilla	LB	Águilas Blancas IPN	Liga Mayor ONEFA
1	2	Mexicas	Jerónimo Arzate	CB	Pumas CU UNAM	Liga Mayor ONEFA
1	3	Osos	Daniel Rubio	RB	Potros Salvajes UAEM	Liga Mayor ONEFA
1	4	Dinos	Carlos Mercado	OL	Borregos Salvajes Monterrey	Liga Premier CONADEIP
1	5	Artilleros	Diego Bedolla	OL	Aztecas UDLAP	Liga Premier CONADEIP
1	6	Fundidores	Martín Maldonado	DL	Borregos Salvajes Monterrey	Liga Premier CONADEIP
1	7	Raptors	Ricardo Sainz	WR/DB	Pumas CU UNAM	Liga Mayor ONEFA
1	8	Condors	Luis Adán Ochoa	DL	Águilas Blancas IPN	Liga Mayor ONEFA
2	9	Pioneros	Saúl Aguilar	OL	Auténticos Tigres UANL	Liga Mayor ONEFA
2	10	Mexicas	Daniel Concepción	OL	Águilas Blancas IPN	Liga Mayor ONEFA
2	11	Osos	Carlos Garza	LB	Leones Anáhuac Norte	Liga Mayor ONEFA
2	12	Fundidores vía Dinos	Josué Antonio López	OL	Águilas Universidad Autónoma de Chihuahua	Liga Mayor ONEFA
2	13	Artilleros	Osvaldo Zumalacarregui	DB	Aztecas UDLAP	Liga Premier CONADEIP
2	14	Fundidores	Cosme Lozano	DB	Borregos Salvajes Monterrey	Liga Premier CONADEIP
2	15	Raptors	Alfonso Trejos	DL	Burros Blancos IPN	Liga Mayor ONEFA
2	16	Condors	Luis Canela	LB	Pumas CU UNAM	Liga Mayor ONEFA
3	17	Pioneros	Ricardo Servín	RB	Pumas UNAM Acatlán	Liga Mayor ONEFA
3	18	Mexicas	Gerardo Rarmírez	CB	Pumas CU UNAM	Liga Mayor ONEFA
3	19	Osos	Hanscel López	QB	Potros Salvajes UAEM	Liga Mayor ONEFA
3	20	Fundidores vía Dinos	Edgar Cortez	OL	Auténticos Tigres UANL	Liga Mayor ONEFA
3	21	Artilleros	Diego Torres	LB	Aztecas UDLAP	Liga Premier CONADEIP
3	22	Fundidores	Enrique Zepeda	LB	Auténticos Tigres UANL	Liga Mayor ONEFA
3	23	Raptors	Marco Camacho	WR	Borregos Salvajes México	Liga Premier CONADEIP
3	24	Condors	Daniel Murillo	DL	Pumas CU UNAM	Liga Mayor ONEFA
4	25	Mexicas vía Pioneros	Brandon López	QB	Toros Salvajes Chapingo	Liga Mayor ONEFA
4	26	Mexicas	Ricardo Razo	SS	Leones Anáhuac Norte	Liga Mayor ONEFA
4	27	Raptors vía Osos	Gustavo Orostico	DB	Burros Blancos IPN	Liga Mayor ONEFA
4	28	Fundidores vía Dinos	Patricio Garza	WR	Lobos UAdeC	Liga Mayor ONEFA
4	29	Artilleros	Jorge Eduardo Retana	WR	Aztecas UDLAP	Liga Premier CONADEIP
4	30	Fundidores	Itan Salas	LB	Auténticos Tigres UANL	Liga Mayor ONEFA
4	31	Raptors	Rodrigo Aquino	WR	Burros Blancos IPN	Liga Mayor ONEFA
4	32	Condors	Jorge Sámano	LB	Leones Anáhuac Norte	Liga Mayor ONEFA
5	33	Mexicas vía Pioneros	Mario Ortiz	WR	Leones Anáhuac Norte	Liga Mayor ONEFA
5	34	Mexicas	Eduardo Jiménez	WR	Burros Blancos IPN	Liga Mayor ONEFA
5	35	Osos	Alejandro Sánchez	OL	Potros Salvajes UAEM	Liga Mayor ONEFA
5	36	Fundidores vía Dinos	Marco Santana	QB	Lobos UAdeC	Liga Mayor ONEFA
5	37	Artilleros	Marco Covarrubias	OL	Aztecas UDLAP	Liga Premier CONADEIP
5	38	Fundidores	Pick declined			
5	39	Raptors	Julio Villarreal	DL	Leones Anáhuac Norte	Liga Mayor ONEFA
5	40	Condors	Alberto González	K	Pumas CU UNAM	Liga Mayor ONEFA
6	41	Pioneros	Jorge Contreras	OL	Pumas UNAM Acatlán	Liga Mayor ONEFA
6	42	Mexicas	Fernando Hernández		Toros Salvajes Chapingo	Liga Mayor ONEFA
6	43	Raptors vía Osos	Luis González	OL	Pumas UNAM Acatlán	Liga Mayor ONEFA
6	44	Dinos	Ángel Martínez	DL	Lobos UAdeC	Liga Mayor ONEFA
6	45	Artilleros	Jorge Bravo	WR	Aztecas UDLAP	Liga Premier CONADEIP
6	46	Raptors	Sean Muzquiz	DL	Leones Anáhuac Norte	Liga Mayor ONEFA
6	47	Condors	Mario Alberto Hernández	WR	Pumas CU UNAM	Liga Mayor ONEFA
7	49	Pioneros	Pick declined			
7	50	Mexicas	Emmanuel Vargas	DL	Águilas Blancas IPN	Liga Mayor ONEFA
7	51	Raptors vía Osos	Jorge Guzmán	DE	Pumas CU UNAM	Liga Mayor ONEFA
7	52	Dinos	Andrés Castro	DB	Lobos UAdeC	Liga Mayor ONEFA
7	53	Artilleros	Diego Vásquez	WR	Lobos BUAP	Liga Mayor ONEFA
7	54	Raptors	Eric Remigio	WR	Búhos IPN	Liga Mayor FADEMAC
7	55	Condors	Yannic Hernández	DB	Burros Blancos IPN	Liga Mayor ONEFA
8	57	Mexicas	Raymundo Mora	OL	Frailes UT	Liga Mayor ONEFA
8	58	Osos	Pick declined			
8	59	Dinos	Fernando Gómez	WR	Auténticos Tigres UANL	Liga Mayor ONEFA
8	60	Artilleros	Geovanni Gómez	CB	Lobos BUAP	Liga Mayor ONEFA
8	61	Raptors	Miguel Ríos	DL	Leones Anáhuac Norte	Liga Mayor ONEFA
8	62	Condors	Yair Alejandro Márquez	QB	Águilas Blancas IPN	Liga Mayor ONEFA
9	63	Mexicas	Sergio Soriano	OL	Águilas Blancas IPN	Liga Mayor ONEFA
9	64	Artilleros	Brandon Barrios	DB	Lobos BUAP	Liga Mayor ONEFA
9	65	Raptors	Ozdi Nimrod Barona	QB	Pumas UNAM Acatlán	Liga Mayor ONEFA
9	66	Condors	Gustavo Aguilar	RB	Pumas UNAM Acatlán	Liga Mayor ONEFA
10	67	Mexicas	Carlos Climaco	RB	Burros Blancos IPN	Liga Mayor ONEFA
10	68	Artilleros	Diego Ruíz	QB	Aztecas UDLAP	Liga Premier CONADEIP
10	69	Raptors	César Iván Alanís	OL	Frailes UT	Liga Mayor ONEFA
10	70	Condors	Javier Arceo	RB	Linces UVM	Liga Mayor ONEFA
11	71	Artilleros	Kevin Brian Correa	RB	Aztecas UDLAP	Liga Premier CONADEIP
11	72	Artilleros	Diego Huerta	LB	Aztecas UDLAP	Liga Premier CONADEIP
11	73	Artilleros	Alberto Adduci Bellizi	OL	Aztecas UDLAP	Liga Premier CONADEIP

Complementary selections

*In exchange for draft selection in the Mayan draft, Dinos gave Fundidores selections in the second, third, fourth, and fifth round of the 2020 draft. ** In exchange for WR Aldo Narvaes and Josep Acosta, Pioneers gave Mexica selections in the fourth and fifth round of the 2020 draft. *** In exchange for Mayan draft picks, Osos gave Raptors selections in the fourth, sixth, and seventh round of the 2020 draft.

=== Mayas draft ===
For the 2020 season, the 8 teams of the LFA made a draft of the Mayas' players who declared themselves eligible to play the 2020 season with some other team in the league, with the intention to continue playing and not lose the pace of competition. Artilleros declined participation by arguing not to be interested in any Mayas' players.

Mayas draft
Rd	Sel.	LFA Team	Player	Pos.
1	1	Mexicas	Isaac Medina	DL
1	2	Fundidores	*Marco García	QB
1	3	Dinos	Omar Cojolum	RB
1	4	Osos	Leonel Ramírez	OL
1	5	Raptors	Edgar White	LB
1	6	Pioneros	Ramiro Pruneda	OL
1	7	Condors	Josué Martínez	WR
2	8	Mexicas	Diego Magaña	DL
2	9	Dinos vía Fundidores	Mariano Vargas	OL
2	10	Dinos	Lennin Ortiz	RB
2	11	Osos	Jonathan Segura	OL
2	12	Raptors	Jesús Sosa Piña	RB
2	13	Pioneros	Álvaro Camacho	QB
2	14	Condors	Luis David Martínez	WR
3	15	Mexicas	Uriel Ávalos	DE
3	16	Osos	Juan Vázquez	DB
3	17	Raptors	Adan Hernández	SS
3	18	Pioneros	**Jordi Saldaña	FS
3	19	Condors	Ricardo Espinoza	CB
4	20	Mexicas	Uriel López	LB
4	21	Osos	José Falcón	CB
4	22	Raptors	Christian Gómez	WR
4	24	Condors	Luis Zárate	LB
5	20	Mexicas	Carlos Díaz	TE
5	21	Osos	Sebastián Baig	LB
5	22	Raptors	Edgar Arroyo	RB
5	24	Condors	Marco Morales	WR
6	25	Mexicas	Jonathan García	LB
6	26	Osos	Gustavo Ramos	WR
6	27	Raptors	José Garatachea	SS
6	28	Condors	Fernando Aguirre	DL
7	29	Raptors	Arturo Callejos	QB

*He declined his hiring for labor reasons | **Hired by the Raptors

== Teams ==
Team	City	Stadium	Capacity	Head coach
North Division
Dinos	Saltillo, Coahuila	Estadio Olímpico Francisco I. Madero	8,000	(Mexico) Javier Adame
Fundidores	Monterrey, Nuevo León	Estadio Borregos	10,057	(Mexico) Carlos Strevel
Pioneros	Querétaro City, Querétaro	Unidad Deportiva El Pueblito	4,000	(Mexico) Rassielh López
Raptors	Naucalpan, State of Mexico	Estadio José Ortega Martínez	3,700	(Mexico) Guillermo Gutiérrez
Central Division
Artilleros	Puebla City, Puebla	Estadio Universitario BUAP	19,283	(Mexico) Gustavo Torres
Condors	Mexico City	Estadio ITESM Santa Fe	2,500	(Mexico) Félix Buendía
Mexicas	Mexico City	Estadio Perros Negros	2,500	(Mexico) Héctor Toxqui
Osos	Toluca, State of Mexico	Estadio Fortaleza Siglo XXI	4,000	(Mexico) Horacio García

== Season structure ==
The training camp began in the first week of November 2019, some teams started early, as the case of Condors and Dinos that began at the end of October. The regular season is played from February to April. Each team faces each of the teams of their respective division twice, once at home and once as a visitor. There will also be 4 games between conferences, each team will have two home games and two visiting. There will be three bye weeks: one between week 5 and 6 and also for teams that enter playoffs between week 10 and the conference finals, and one week before the Tazón México V.

=== Suspension ===
On March 16, after Week 5, the league announced the indefinite suspension of the season due to the COVID-19 pandemic. It was informed that none of the eight team players were affected by the virus. It was also announced that all the foreign players participating in the league as part of the LFA-CFL agreement would return immediately to their countries.

=== Cancellation ===
On April 29, Alejandro Jaimes, the LFA commissioner, announced that the season would be cancelled and that the league would return until 2021.

== Regular season ==
=== Standings ===
Note: GP = Games played, W = Wins, L = Losses, PF = Points for, PA = Points against

North Division
Team	GP	W	L	PF	PA	Div	Stk
Raptors	5	4	1	112	44	2–1	W2
Dinos	5	3	2	93	89	2–1	L2
Fundidores	5	3	2	77	81	1–2	L1
Pioneros	5	1	4	40	103	1–2	L1

Central Division
Team	GP	W	L	PF	PA	Div	Stk
Condors	5	4	1	121	82	2–1	L1
Mexicas	5	2	3	86	82	2–1	W1
Artilleros	5	2	3	107	107	1–2	W2
Osos	5	1	4	68	116	1–2	L2

=== Results ===
Week 1
Away	Score	Home	Venue	Date	Time	TV
Raptors	13–5	Mexicas	Estadio Perros Negros	February 7	20:00	Claro Sports
Condors	29–7	Pioneros	Unidad Deportiva El Pueblito	February 8	12:00	TUDN, Claro Sports
Artilleros	10–12	Dinos	Estadio Olímpico Francisco I. Madero	February 8	18:30	Claro Sports, Multimedios, RCG TV, Televisa
Fundidores	20–14	Osos	Fortaleza Siglo XXI	February 9	12:00	Claro Sports, Nuestra Visión (USA)

Week 2
Away	Score	Home	Venue	Date	Time	TV
Dinos	23–15	Fundidores	Estadio Borregos	February 14	20:00	Multimedios, Claro Sports, Nuestra Visión (USA)
Mexicas	26–24	Artilleros	Estadio Universitario BUAP	February 15	12:00	TUDN, Televisa, Claro Sports
Pioneros	2–19	Raptors	Estadio José Ortega Martínez	February 15	17:00	Claro Sports
Osos	10–27	Condors	Estadio ITESM Santa Fe	February 16	12:00	Claro Sports

Week 3
Visitor	Score	Home	Stadium	Date	Time	TV
Osos	16–15	Mexicas	Estadio Perros Negros	February 22	14:00	Claro Sports, TUDN
Raptors	29–30	Dinos	Estadio Olímpico Francisco I. Madero	February 22	19:00	Multimedios, Claro Sports, RCG TV
Artilleros	18–29	Condors	Estadio ITESM Santa Fe	February 23	12:00	Claro Sports, Televisa
Fundidores	23–3	Pioneros	Unidad Deportiva El Pueblito	February 23	15:00	Claro Sports

Week 4
Visitor	Score	Home	Stadium	Date	Time	TV
Mexicas	13–19	Fundidores	Estadio Borregos	February 28	20:30	Multimedios, Claro Sports
Osos	7–23	Raptors	Estadio José Ortega Martínez	February 29	17:00	Claro Sports
Dinos	20–26	Condors	Estadio ITESM Santa Fe	March 1	12:00	Claro Sports
Pioneros	19–24	Artilleros	Estadio Universitario BUAP	March 14	14:00	Televisa, Claro Sports

Week 5
Visitor	Score	Home	Stadium	Date	Time	TV
Condors	10–27	Mexicas	Estadio Perros Negros	March 7	12:00	Claro Sports
Fundidores	0–28	Raptors	Estadio José Ortega Martínez	March 7	17:00	Claro Sports
Pioneros	9–8	Dinos	Estadio Olímpico Francisco I. Madero	March 7	18:30	Televisa, Claro Sports, RCG TV
Artilleros	31–21	Osos	Universidad Siglo XXI	March 8	12:00	Claro Sports, Televisa

Week 6
Visitor	Score	Home	Stadium	Date	Time	TV
Fundidores	cancelled	Dinos	Estadio Olímpico Francisco I. Madero	March 21	18:30	Televisa, Claro Sports, RCG TV
Artilleros	cancelled	Mexicas	Estadio Perros Negros	March 21	19:00	Claro Sports, Televisa
Osos	cancelled	Condors	ITESM Santa Fe	March 22	12:00	Claro Sports
Raptors	cancelled	Pioneros	La Pirámide	March 22	15:00	Claro Sports

Week 7
Visitor	Score	Home	Stadium	Date	Time	TV
Pioneros	cancelled	Fundidores	Estadio Nuevo León Unido	March 27	20:00	Televisa Claro Sports
Condors	cancelled	Artilleros	Estadio Universitario BUAP	March 28	14:00	Televisa Claro Sports
Dinos	cancelled	Raptors	José Ortega Martínez	March 28	17:00	Claro Sports
Mexicas	cancelled	Osos	Universidad Siglo XXI	March 29	12:00	Claro Sports

Week 8
Visitor	Score	Home	Stadium	Date	Time	TV
Fundidores	cancelled	Artilleros	Estadio Universitario BUAP	April 4	14:00	Televisa Claro Sports
Osos	cancelled	Dinos	Estadio Olímpico Francisco I. Madero	April 4	18:30	Televisa Claro Sports RCG TV
Raptors	cancelled	Condors	ITESM Santa Fe	April 5	12:00	Claro Sports
Mexicas	cancelled	Pioneros	La Pirámide	April 5	15:00	Claro Sports

Week 9
Visitor	Score	Home	Stadium	Date	Time	TV
Condors	cancelled	Fundidores	Estadio Nuevo León Unido	April 17	20:00	Televisa Claro Sports
Pioneros	cancelled	Osos	Universidad Siglo XXI	April 18	12:00	Claro Sports
Artilleros	cancelled	Raptors	José Ortega Martínez	April 18	17:00	Claro Sports Televisa
Dinos	cancelled	Mexicas	Estadio Perros Negros	April 19	13:00	Claro Sports

Week 10
Visitor	Score	Home	Stadium	Date	Time	TV
Raptors	cancelled	Fundidores	Estadio Nuevo León Unido	April 24	20:00	Televisa Claro Sports
Osos	cancelled	Artilleros	Estadio Universitario BUAP	April 25	14:00	Televisa Claro Sports
Mexicas	cancelled	Condors	ITESM Santa Fe	April 25	12:00	Claro Sports
Dinos	cancelled	Pioneros	La Pirámide	April 26	15:00	Claro Sports
