= 2016 LFA season =

- Duration: 21 February 2016 – 3 April 2016

Tazón México I
- Date: 10 April 2016
- Venue: Estadio Jesús Martínez "Palillo", Mexico City
- Champions: Mayas

Seasons
- 2017

The 2016 LFA season was the inaugural season of the Liga de Fútbol Americano Profesional (LFA), the top American football league in Mexico. The regular season began on February 21 and concluded on April 3. The Tazón México I was played on April 10 with the Mayas defeating the Raptors to win the first LFA championship.

== News ==
The Liga de Fútbol Americano Profesional (Professional American Football League) was officially presented on January 12, 2016, by Miguel Ángel Mancera, Head of Government of the Federal District from 2012 to 2018.

Four teams would take part in the first season, all of them, newly created clubs: Condors, Eagles, Mayas and Raptors.

All the games would be played at the Estadio Jesús Martínez "Palillo" of the Magdalena Mixhuca Sports City, including the championship game, the Tazón México I.

== Regular season ==
=== Structure ===
Teams played all the opponents twice. At the end of the season, the top two classified teams qualify to the championship game, the Tazón México.

=== Standings ===
Note: GP = Games played, W = Wins, L = Losses, PF = Points for, PA = Points against

Teams in bold qualified to the championship game.

Team	GP	W	L	PF	PA	Stk
**Mayas**	6	4	2	158	99	L1
**Raptors**	6	4	2	139	124	W4
Eagles	6	3	3	136	139	W1
Condors	6	1	5	102	173	L5

=== Results ===
Week 1
Away	Score	Home	Venue	Date	Kickoff (UTC-6)
**Mayas**	34–6	Raptors	Estadio Jesús Martínez "Palillo"	February 21	11:00
Eagles	28–30	**Condors**	Estadio Jesús Martínez "Palillo"	February 21	15:30

Week 2
Away	Score	Home	Venue	Date	Kickoff (UTC-6)
Condors	14–45	**Mayas**	Estadio Jesús Martínez "Palillo"	February 28	11:00
Raptors	27–29	**Eagles**	Estadio Jesús Martínez "Palillo"	February 28	15:30

Week 3
Away	Score	Home	Venue	Date	Kickoff (UTC-6)
Eagles	26–33	**Mayas**	Estadio Jesús Martínez "Palillo"	March 6	11:00
**Raptors**	40–34	Condors	Estadio Jesús Martínez "Palillo"	March 6	15:30

Week 4
Away	Score	Home	Venue	Date	Kickoff (UTC-6)
**Raptors**	13–9	Mayas	Estadio Jesús Martínez "Palillo"	March 13	11:00
Condors	0–19	**Eagles**	Estadio Jesús Martínez "Palillo"	March 13	15:30

Week 5
Away	Score	Home	Venue	Date	Kickoff (UTC-6)
Eagles	12–33	**Raptors**	Estadio Jesús Martínez "Palillo"	March 20	11:00
**Mayas**	21–18	Condors	Estadio Jesús Martínez "Palillo"	March 20	15:00

Week 6
Away	Score	Home	Venue	Date	Kickoff (UTC-5)
Condors	6–20	**Raptors**	Estadio Jesús Martínez "Palillo"	April 3	11:00
Mayas	16–22	**Eagles**	Estadio Jesús Martínez "Palillo"	April 3	15:00

== Tazón México I ==
Tazón México I

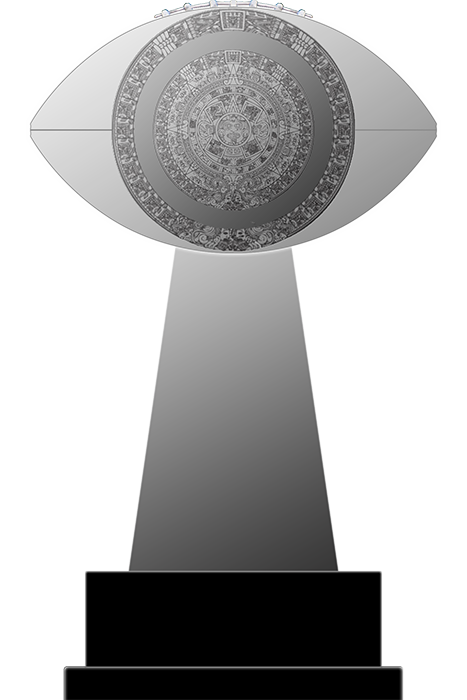

Raptors
vs
Mayas
(4–2)

(4–2)
13

29
Head Coach:

Head Coach:
Rafael Duk

Ernesto Alfaro

Teams	1C	2C	3C	4C
Raptors	0	6	0	7
Mayas	10	7	12	0

Date: 10, April 2016
Kickoff time: 2 p.m.
Stadium: Estadio Jesús Martínez "Palillo"
Attendance: 3,000
MVP: Josué Martínez, WR
Referee: Jorge Armando Rodríguez
TV:
• Tazón México • II →

The first edition of the Tazón México was held at the Estadio Jesús Martínez "Palillo" of the Magdalena Mixhuca Sports City. The match was contested by Raptors, who finished second in the league with a 4–2 regular season record, and Mayas, who finished first with the same regular season record as their rivals.

With three receptions for 53 yards, including two touchdowns, Mayas wide receiver Josué Martínez was selected as the most valuable player of the game.

=== Box score ===
Raptors vs. Mayas – Game summary

Quarter	1	2	3	4	Total
Raptors	0	6	0	7	13
Mayas	10	7	12	0	29

at Estadio Jesús Martínez "Palillo", Mexico City

- Date: April 10, 2016
- Game time: 14:00 UTC-5
- Game weather: Sunny
- Game attendance: 3,000
- Referee: Jorge Armando Rodríguez
- Report

Scoring summary

Quarter	Time	Drive			Team	Scoring information	Score	
Quarter	Time	Plays	Yards	TOP	Team	Scoring information	RAP	MAY
1	7:25	2	4	1:15	MAY	Omar Cojolum 1-yard touchdown run, Mauricio Morales kick good	0	7
1	2:35	8	79	4:26	MAY	26-yard field goal by Morales	0	10
2	1:54	10	77	5:15	MAY	Josué Martínez 5-yard touchdown reception from Marco García, Morales kick good	0	17
2	0:00	8	50	1:54	RAP	Enrique Barraza 2-yard touchdown reception from Víctor Martínez, Enrique Barraza kick no good	6	17
3	14:10	2	75	0:50	MAY	Cojolum 72-yard touchdown run, Morales kick no good	6	23
3	7:11	1	33	0:06	MAY	Martínez 33-yard touchdown reception from García, Morales kick no good	6	29
4	10:04	1	12	0:07	RAP	Sergio Flores 12-yard touchdown run, Barraza kick good	13	29
"TOP" = time of possession. For other American football terms, see Glossary of American football.							13	29
