= Osos de Monterrey =

Mexican American football team

Logo

General information
- Founded: 27 January 2025; 16 months ago
- Stadium: Estadio Banorte
- Headquartered: Monterrey, Mexico
- Colours: Orange and black
- Website: OsosLFA.com

Personnel
- Owner: Athlete Ownership Group
- Head coach: Jorge Valdez

League / conference affiliations
- Liga de Fútbol Americano Profesional

The Osos de Monterrey (English: Monterrey Bears) are an American football team based in Monterrey, Nuevo León, Mexico. The Osos compete in the Liga de Fútbol Americano Profesional (LFA), the top American football league in Mexico. The team plays its home games at the Estadio Banorte.

A group of American pro athletes, led by Blake Griffin and Ryan Kalil, bought the Fundidores de Monterrey franchise before rebranding the team as the Osos.

== History ==
On 27 January 2025, it was announced that the Fundidores de Monterrey franchise had been purchased by the Athlete Ownership Group, a group of professional athletes from the United States led by former NFL player Ryan Kalil and former NBA player Blake Griffin. The team was rebranded as the Osos de Monterrey, with orange and black as the new team colors. The former owners, Fabián Marcos and José Luis Domene, retained a minority stake in the team.

In the press release announcement, Griffin explained the name change:

Osos was inspired by the black bears native to Monterrey and the Sierra Madre mountains. The name is simple, memorable, and rooted in the city's identity. It stands for resilience, strength, and grit—qualities that define Monterrey and what we want this team to stand for.

The new ownership group also included active NFL players Christian McCaffrey, George Kittle, and Sam Darnold, as well as former Carolina Panthers such as Luke Kuechly, Greg Olsen, Julius Peppers, Ron Rivera, and Jonathan Stewart. It was announced that a documentary would be produced on the project, which was itself modeled after the purchase of Wrexham A.F.C. by actors Rob McElhenney and Ryan Reynolds. In an interview with ESPN, Kalil said: "One of the things that drew us to the LFA was that this is quality football. [It's] very comparable to some of the other spring leagues around the world."

== Season-by-season ==
Season	Head coach	Regular season				Postseason			
Season	Head coach	Won	Lost	Win %	Finish	Won	Lost	Win %	Result
Osos de Monterrey
2025	Jorge Valdez	6	2	.750	2nd (League)	1	1	.500	Won Semifinals (Caudillos) 27–24; Lost Tazón México VIII (Mexicas) 12–13
Total		6	2	.750		1	1	.500	
