= Texas Pioneros =

Mexican American football team

Logo

General information
- Founded: 12 December 2018; 7 years ago
- Stadium: Bernard Birkelbach Field
- Headquartered: Georgetown, Texas
- Colours: Red, Blue, Gold and White
- Website: www.ifa.football

Personnel
- Owners: Braulio Huerta, Jason Adams
- Head coach: Art Briles

League / conference affiliations
- Fútbol Americano de México; 2019; 2021–2022; Liga de Fútbol Americano Profesional; 2020; International Football Alliance; 2024–

Championships
- FAM title(s): 0; 2019

Texas Pioneros are a professional American football team based in Georgetown, Texas. The Pioneros compete in the International Football Alliance (IFA) and plays their home games at Bernard Birkelbach Field.

The team is expected to play in the International Football Alliance (IFA), after relocating to Dallas, Texas. and then relocating to Georgetown, Texas.

The team formally changed its name to the Dallas Pioneros once joining the International Football Alliance, the team was moved from Querétaro, Mexico to Dallas, Texas to Georgetown, Texas.

== History ==
Pioneros was founded in December 2018 as one of the charter members of Fútbol Americano de México (FAM), a minor-professional American football league in Mexico. Gene Dahlquist was appointed as the team's first head coach. Nevertheless, Dahlquist left the team after two games citing personal reasons and was replaced with Rassielh López.

In their first season, Pioneros won the FAM championship after defeating the Centauros de Ciudad Juárez 16–0. A few months later, it was announced that the team would join the Liga de Fútbol Americano Profesional (LFA) for the 2020 season, as the ninth team of the LFA.

For the 2020 season, Pioneros signed several players, including American quarterback Ryan Pahos. In their LFA debut game, Pioneros lost against the 2019 champion, Condors, 7–29.

In 2021, the LFA and the Pioneros Querétaro parted ways.

Later, the Pioneros returned to the FAM for the 2022 season. The FAM shut down league operations in September 2022 due to financial struggles.

The Dallas Pioneros hired Art Briles to coach the team in the inaugural 2025 International Football Alliance season which starts June 7, 2025. On February 10, the Dallas Pioneros announced they would be playing at Bernard Birkelbach Field, located outside of Austin, Texas. With the move the team was renamed to the Texas Pioneros.

Pioneros former logo (2018-2022)

== Season-by-season ==
Season	League	Head coach	Regular season				Postseason			
Season	League	Head coach	Won	Lost	Win %	Finish	Won	Lost	Win %	Result
2019	FAM	Rassielh López	5	3	.625	1st	2	0	1.000	Won FAM Championship game (Centauros) 16–0
2020	LFA	Rassielh López	1	4	.200	4th (North)	Postseason cancelled due to the COVID-19 pandemic			
2021	FAM	Ricardo Cuanalo	Season cancelled due to the COVID-19 pandemic							
2022	FAM	Alberto de León	3	5	.375	6th	Did not qualify			

== Notable players ==
- (Mexico) Ramiro Pruneda – OT (2020)
