= Marco Martos =

Marcos Martos may refer to:

- Marco Martos (American football) (born 1973), Mexican American football player
- Marco Martos Carrera, Peruvian poet
