= 2017 LFA season =

- Duration: 18 February 2017 – 9 April 2017
- North Champions champions: Dinos
- Central Champions champions: Mayas

Tazón México II
- Date: 30 April 2017
- Venue: Estadio Jesús Martínez "Palillo", Mexico City
- Champions: Mayas

Seasons
- 2016 2018

The 2017 LFA season was the second season of the Liga de Fútbol Americano Profesional (LFA). This season saw two new franchises join the league: Dinos (short for "dinosaurios", the Spanish word for dinosaurs) and Fundidores (Spanish for smelters or founders) to bring the league to a total of 6 teams. The regular season began on February 18 and concluded on April 9. The Tazón México II was played on April 30 with the Mayas defeating the Dinos to win their second LFA championship.

== News ==
On September 28, 2016, the LFA announced its expansion for the 2017 season: the Monterrey Founders and the Saltillo Dinos.

Prior to the Mexico II Bowl, the visiting team, Dinos, was about to cancel the match since they had to travel by bus 10 hours from Saltillo to Mexico City, get to play and return immediately, with no opportunity to train or rest before the game, which put them at a notable disadvantage. The LFA had no budget to pay for airplanes and hotels for players and staff members.

Due to the increase in teams for the 2017 season, the LFA made some changes in the competition format, creating two divisions, the North and the center, although for sponsorship reasons these divisions were named after commercial products. The new format included divisional championships to be played in the postseason, the winners of which would go to the Tazón México.

The salary cap per franchise was 650,000 MXN (US$30,000 ).

=== Coaching changes ===
Eagles: José Campuzano replaced Antonio Sandoval as head coach for the Eagles after a 3–3 season

=== Standings ===
Note: GP = Games played, W = Wins, L = Losses, PF = Points for, PA = Points against, Diff=Difference between pts. for and against

Teams in bold qualified for the playoffs

North Division
Team	GP	W	L	PF	PA	Diff
**Raptors**	7	5	2	160	121	39
Dinos	7	2	5	117	137	−20
Fundidores	7	2	5	112	146	−34

Central Division
Team	GP	W	L	PF	PA	Diff
**Mayas**	7	6	1	256	150	106
Eagles	7	4	3	159	150	9
Condors	7	2	5	110	210	−100

=== Results ===
Week 1
Away	Score	Home	Venue	Date	Kickoff (UTC-6)
**Dinos**	33–16	Fundidores	Olímpico Francisco I. Madero	February 18	15:00
Condors	10–13	**Raptors**	Estadio Jesús Martínez "Palillo"	February 19	11:00
**Eagles**	33–21	Mayas	Estadio Jesús Martínez "Palillo"	February 19	15:00

Week 2
Away	Score	Home	Venue	Date	Kickoff (UTC-6)
Condors	16–64	**Mayas**	Estadio Jesús Martínez "Palillo"	February 26	11:00
Fundidores	24–25	**Eagles**	Estadio Tecnológico	February 26	13:00
**Raptors**	34–27	Dinos	Estadio Jesús Martínez "Palillo"	February 26	15:00

Week 3
Away	Score	Home	Venue	Date	Kickoff (UTC-6)
Eagles	20–24	**Condors**	Estadio Jesús Martínez "Palillo"	March 5	11:00
**Fundidores**	22–21	Raptors	Estadio Tecnológico	March 5	13:00
**Mayas**	30–12	Dinos	Estadio Jesús Martínez "Palillo"	March 5	15:00

Week 4
Away	Score	Home	Venue	Date	Kickoff (UTC-6)
Raptors	31–34	**Mayas**	Estadio Jesús Martínez "Palillo"	March 12	11:00
Dinos	10–14	**Eagles**	Olímpico Francisco I. Madero	March 12	14:00
**Condors**	14–12	Fundidores	Estadio Jesús Martínez "Palillo"	March 12	15:00

Week 5
Away	Score	Home	Venue	Date	Kickoff (UTC-6)
**Dinos**	23–10	Condors	Olímpico Francisco I. Madero	March 19	15:30
Eagles	24–27	**Mayas**	Estadio Jesús Martínez "Palillo"	March 26	11:00
**Raptors**	14–10	Fundidores	Estadio Jesús Martínez "Palillo"	March 26	15:00

Week 6
Away	Score	Home	Venue	Date	Kickoff (UTC-5)
**Mayas**	47–20	Condors	Estadio Jesús Martínez "Palillo"	April 2	11:00
**Fundidores**	14–6	Dinos	Estadio Tecnológico	April 2	14:00
Eagles	12–28	**Raptors**	Estadio Jesús Martínez "Palillo"	April 2	15:00

Week 7
Away	Score	Home	Venue	Date	Kickoff (UTC-6)
Condors	16–31	**Eagles**	Estadio Jesús Martínez "Palillo"	April 2	15:00
**Mayas**	33–14	Fundidores	Estadio Tecnológico	April 9	14:00
Dinos	6–19	**Raptors**	Olímpico Francisco I. Madero	April 9	14:00

== Playoffs ==
=== Playoff bracket ===
Division Finals
C2	Eagles	18
C1	Mayas	48
N2	Dinos	13
N1	Raptors	10

Tazón Mexico II
C1	Mayas	24
N1	Dinos	18

* Indicates overtime victory

=== Tazón México II ===
Tazón México II

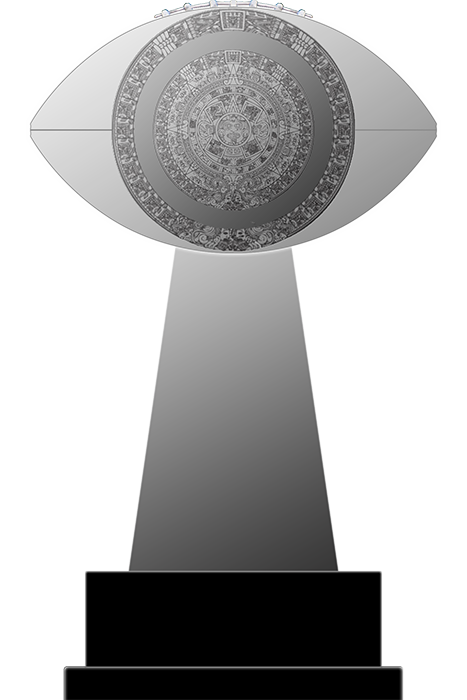

Dinos
vs
Mayas
(2–5)

(6–2)
18

24
Head Coach:

Head Coach:
Guillermo Ruiz

Ernesto Alfaro

Teams	1	2	3	4	Total
Dinos	3	7	0	8	18
Mayas	0	14	3	7	24

Date: 30, April 2017
Stadium: Estadio Jesús Martínez "Palillo"
Attendance: 3,000
MVP: Marco Garcia, QB
Referee: Jorge Armando Rodríguez
TV:
← I • Tazón México • III →

The Tazón México II (called Indian Motorcycle Tazón México II for sponsorship reasons) was the second edition of the LFA championship game. The Mayas obtained repeat championships by winning against Dinos at the Estadio Jesús Martínez "Palillo" in Mexico City, by a score of 24–18. The MVP of the game was QB Marco Garcia.

Quarter	Time	Series			Team	Annotations	Score	
Quarter	Time	Plays	Yds	TOP	Team	Annotations	DIN	MAY
1	4:27	11	78	5:37	DIN	Field goal, 20 yards from K Gallarado	3	0
2	13:30	3	75	1:30	DIN	Touchdown, 1-yard run from QB Alberto García; the extra point is good (K Gallarado))	10	0
2	9:31	7	80	3:53	MAY	Touchdown, 42-yard pass from QB Marco García to WR Josue Martinez; the extra point is good (K Mauricio Morales)	10	7
2	4:51	6	47	3:06	MAY	Touchdown, 10-yard run from QB Marco García; the extra point is good (K Mauricio Morales)	10	14
3	1:50	9	42	3:35	MAY	Field goal, 20 yards from K Gallarado	10	17
4	6:21	7	93	4:11	MAY	Touchdown, 10-yard run from RB Omar Cojolum; the extra point is good (K Mauricio Morales)	10	24
4	1:16	–	–	–	DIN	Safety of P Aceves (Mayas)	12	24
4	0:39	3	75	0:35	DIN	Touchdown, 5-yard pass from QB Alberto García to WR Gerardo Álvarez; the extra point is good (K Gallarado)	18	24

== Awards ==
Following the season, awards are shown the best of the 2017 season.

Award	Winner	(Position)	Team
MVP of the season	Bruno Márquez	QB	Raptors
Coach of the year	Ernesto Alfaro	HC	Mayas
Offensive player of the year	Josué Martínez	WR	Mayas
Defensive player of the year	Daniel Carrete	LB	Dinos
Best Offensive Lineman	Jonathan Segura	OL	Eagles
Best defensive lineman	Octavio Martínez	DL	Eagles
Best deep threat	Luis González	WR	Raptors
Best linebacker	Ángel Rosado	LB	Condors
Best runner	Omar Cojolum	RB	Mayas
Best receiver	Gerardo Álvarez	WR	Dinos
