= Liga de Fútbol Americano Profesional =

Professional American football league in Mexico

Professional American Football League
- Most recent season or competition: 2026 LFA season
- Sport: American football
- Founded: January 12, 2016; 10 years ago
- Commissioner: Gonzalo Sevilla
- No. of teams: 8
- Country: Mexico
- Headquarters: Mexico City, Mexico
- Most recent champions: Caudillos (3rd title)
- Most titles: Caudillos (3 titles)
- Broadcasters: Mexico; ESPN; United States; Telemundo Deportes
- Website: LFA.mx

The Liga de Fútbol Americano Profesional (LFA; English: Professional American Football League), officially known as the LFA Finsus for sponsorship reasons, is a professional American football league in Mexico, founded in 2016. Starting with four teams, the LFA currently fields seven active franchises as of the 2026 season. The regular season runs in the spring and summer, from April to June. The championship game is called Tazón México (Mexico Bowl) and is played late May or June. The players are drafted from the country's college football organization, ONEFA, and through international drafts, which mainly recruit American players.

LFA is the top level of professional American football in Mexico, having an alliance with the Canadian Football League (CFL).

In November 2025, Global Sports Capital Partners (GSCP) announced a historic investment in the LFA, pledging over $100 million USD over at least seven years and assuming full management of the league.

== History ==
=== Background ===
American football has been played in Mexico since the 1920s and is the fourth most popular sport in the country. The LFA was the brainchild of Juan Carlos Vázquez, a former Fox Sports commentator. Vázquez was a huge fan of the previous American football league in Mexico from the 1990s called the Liga Nacional de Futbol Americano Masters, and had always dreamed of creating his own league. In 2015, Vázquez along with Edgar Zapata managed to put together a group of investors who decided to offer football while the NFL, NCAA, ONEFA, and CONADEIP are in the offseason and founded the LFA, which would start two weeks after Super Bowl 50. The LFA would be the first professional American football league in Mexico in 20 years.

=== 2016 ===
Four charter members participated in the inaugural 2016 season: the Eagles, the Raptors, the Mayas, and the Condors. All teams were based in Mexico City. The first game was played on 21 February 2016, between the Raptors and the Mayas, with the Mayas winning the game 34–6. The first title game, the Tazón México (Mexico Bowl), was held on 10 April 2016 between the Mayas and the Raptors. The Mayas won Tazón México I, 29–13. All games were played at the "Palillo" Martínez Stadium in the Magdalena Mixhuca Sports City. The LFA experienced significant financial problems during 2016, with a season average attendance of only 2,000 per game.

League MVP Marco García, QB Mexico City Mayas

=== 2017 ===
Despite the financial difficulties in 2016, the LFA expanded to six teams in 2017, with the addition of Dinos de Saltillo and Fundidores Monterrey (Spanish for smelters or founders), who took players from the college programs in the ONEFA and CONADEIP. Due to the difficulty of travel, the Dinos nearly canceled going to Tazón México II. In the end, the game was played on April 30, 2017 at Jesús Martínez "Palillo" between the Mayas and the Dinos. The Mayas maintained dominance over the league and won the Tazón México for the second time, 24–18.

On October 28, 2017, Juan Carlos Vázquez left the presidency of the LFA. The title of President was eliminated and the position of the Commissioner was created, which was occupied by Guillermo Ruiz Burguete

League MVP Bruno Márquez, QB Mexico City Raptors

=== 2018 ===
On January 16, the newly appointed LFA commissioner, Guillermo Ruiz Burguete, resigned. The league did not announce his replacement. For operational purposes, the activities of the commissioner were absorbed by the president of the board of directors of the league, Óscar Pérez.

During the 2018 season, the Eagles were renamed the Mexicas. In March, the Mexicas generated controversy by refusing to play against the Dinos in Week 3, after a serious knee injury to wide receiver Mubalama Massimango that occurred in Week 1. The Mexicas claim the injury was not properly attended to by the LFA. Although the league recognized that there was an administrative problem with the medical expenses insurance policy, the Mexicas were punished for their actions. The LFA ruled the Dinos game as a forfeit by the Mexicas, and the Mexicas team was fined Mex$657,820.00 (approximately US$32,000) for damages caused to the league, its TV partners, its press partners, the Dinos team, and the fans. Additional, the Mexicas would have to change their franchise for the 2019 season.

On April 22, 2018, the Tazón México was held on a neutral site for the first time, at Estadio Azul. Originally a half-time show was planned, but the band canceled due to recommendation of Civil Protection force. Tazón México III featured the Mexicas and the Raptors, with the Mexicas winning their first title by a shutout of 17–0.

In November 2018, the LFA signed a non-binding Letter of Intent with the Canadian Football League to share resources and to allow for at least one CFL game to be played in Mexico. CFL commissioner Randy Ambroise said of the deal later that he hopes it'll raise the level of competition in the LFA and give Canadian football players another competition to compete in if they get dropped from the CFL. "For so many, if they finish their junior career or college career and they're not on a CFL roster then there's kind of nowhere to go and their dream ends, I think that's a tragedy. This is really about growing the game of football." The CFL later held a draft in January 2019.

League MVP Ricardo Quintana, QB Mexico City Mexicas

=== 2019 ===
The LFA considered expanding to 10 teams for the 2019 season, with Guadalajara, Puebla, Querétaro and even Tamaulipas among the four possible expansion candidates. However, the league only added two additional franchises: the Osos Toluca (Bears) and the Artilleros Puebla (Artillerymen). A new commissioner was announced, Alejandro Jaimes Trujillo. In January 2019, the CFL held a draft for LFA players, with 27 of the 51 players selected.

On September 4, 2019, the LFA announced plans for expansion for the 2020 season. The newest addition, the Pioneros Querétaro, were not an LFA expansion team in the truest sense. They are an existing team that joined from another league, Fútbol Americano de México (FAM), where they were crowned champions in their first season. The Pioneros will play their games at the La Pirámide Stadium, which is located in the El Pueblito Sports Unit, in the municipality of Corregidora. But with only one new expansion team, the league had an unbalanced number of teams, presenting difficulty for scheduling.

League MVP Bruno Márquez, QB Naucalpan Raptors

=== 2020 ===
The LFA sought to expand by two teams for 2020. One new team joined the league (Pioneros Querétaro) but the league was unable to secure a tenth expansion team. With only nine teams in the league, the LFA made the decision to put the Mayas franchise on hiatus for 2020. This decision was also made in consideration of a change in ownership of the team. The LFA would field only 8 teams for the 2020 season. After five weeks of league play had been completed, on March 16, the LFA announced the suspension of the 2020 season due to the COVID-19 pandemic.

=== 2021 ===
On February 16, 2021 the LFA announced that Marco Montes would be the new owner of the Mayas and that the franchise would be relocated to Puebla City. Despite the move, the Mayas franchise would officially fold in 2021.

The Pioneros Querétaro would leave the LFA to return to FAM.

The 2021 LFA season was once again canceled due to the COVID-19 pandemic.

=== 2022 ===
On February 3, 2022, the Condors CDMX franchise relocated to Querétaro City and changed their name to Gallos Negros. Following the rebrand, the league considers Gallos Negros as a new franchise that began competing in the 2022 season. The LFA would add two more teams: Reyes de Jalisco, based in Zapopan, Jalisco and Galgos de Tijuana. The LFA would also lose a team, as Osos de Toluca would fold in January 2021. With these changes, the 2022 season would have seven teams and, unlike the previous seasons, the league will not be divided into two divisions. As a result, the league decided to expand the playoff field from four teams to six teams. The top two teams will have a bye in the quarterfinals and will host home field in the semifinals.

On March 4, 2022, the Gallos Negros de Querétaro defeated the Galgos de Tijuana by a score of 33–9 at Estadio Caliente to begin the new season.

The Dinos de Saltillo finished the year with a league-best 5–1 record, suffering their only loss to the Raptors de Naucalpan on a 27-28 thriller that featured a game-winning score by QB Bruno Márquez as time expired. However, their success did not translate to the playoffs.

Despite ending with a 1–5 record, the Gallos Negros de Querétaro qualified for the post-season. They proceeded to go on a miraculous playoff run, earning a spot in the Tazón México. Meanwhile, the Fundidores de Monterrey defeated the Raptors de Naucalpan in the semi-final to become the second team that would compete in the championship.

The fifth edition of the Tazón México was played at Estadio Caliente in Tijuana. The Fundidores de Monterrey, led by Martín Maldonado, defeated the Gallos Negros de Querétaro by a score of 18–14 to become champions for the first time in franchise history.

- League MVP: Fundidores QB Shelton Eppler was named the season's MVP.

=== 2023 ===
A competing league, Fútbol Americano de México (FAM), shut down operations due to financial trouble in September 2022. Three former FAM teams joined the LFA for the 2023 season: Caudillos de Chihuahua, Jefes de Ciudad Juárez and Reds de la Ciudad de México.

=== 2024 ===
The Reds franchise folded after the 2023 season and the LFA took over the team's operations. A dispersal draft was held on 29 January that resulted in 32 players moving to 8 of the remaining 9 teams, as the Gallos Negros did not participate in the draft. With an unbalanced schedule, at least one team would have a bye every week.

=== 2025 ===
The LFA added an expansion team for 2025, the Arcángeles de Puebla, while a new ownership group bought the Fundidores de Monterrey franchise and rebranded the team as the Osos de Monterrey. The Osos investors are led by former NFL All-Pro center Ryan Kalil and former NBA All-Star Blake Griffin. Other investors include NFL players Christian McCaffrey and George Kittle (San Francisco 49ers); Sam Darnold (Seattle Seahawks); Julius Peppers, Luke Kuechly and Ron Rivera; and sports podcasters Dan "Big Cat" Katz and PFT Commenter.

=== 2026 ===
On 25 November 2025, it was announced that the league had received foreign backing from Global Sports Capital Partners, who pledged an investment of $100 million over a period of at least seven years. The Arcángeles de Puebla were excluded from the 2026 season, and for the first time since 2022, there are only seven teams and six games per team.

== Teams ==

Team	City	State	Stadium	Capacity	Founded	Joined	Head coach
Caudillos de Chihuahua	Chihuahua City	Chihuahua	Estadio Olímpico Universitario	22,000	2019	2023	(Mexico) Federico Landeros
Dinos de Saltillo	Saltillo	Coahuila	Jorge A. Castro Medina	3,476	2016	2017	(Mexico) Javier Adame
Gallos Negros de Querétaro	Querétaro City	Querétaro	Olímpico de Querétaro	4,600	2021	2022	(Mexico) Marco Martos
Mexicas de la Ciudad de México	Tlalpan	Mexico City	ITESM CCM	2,500	2015^{1}	2016	(Mexico) Félix Buendía
Osos de Monterrey	Monterrey	Nuevo León	Banorte	10,057	2016^{2}	2017	(Mexico) Jorge Valdéz
Raptors del Valle de México	Atizapán de Zaragoza	State of Mexico	Club Comanches	1,500	2015	2016	(Mexico) Horacio García
Reyes de Jalisco	Zapopan	Jalisco	La Fortaleza Azul	3,500	2021	2022	(Mexico) Willy Valdovinos
Toros del Estado de México	TBA	State of Mexico	TBA	TBA	2026	2027	(Mexico) Simón Hernández

^{1} As Eagles
^{2} As Fundidores

=== Former teams ===
Team	City	Stadium	Capacity	First season	Last season	Fate
Arcángeles de Puebla	Puebla City, Puebla	El Cráter Azul	3,000	2024	2025	On Hiatus
Artilleros de Puebla	Puebla City, Puebla	Estadio Universitario BUAP	19,283	2019	2020	Folded
Condors CDMX	Mexico City	Estadio Tormenta Negra	2,500	2016	2020	Folded
Galgos de Tijuana	Tijuana, Baja California	Estadio Caliente	27,333	2022	2024	Folded
Jefes de Ciudad Juárez	Ciudad Juárez, Chihuahua	Estadio 20 de Noviembre	5,000	2022	2024	Folded
Mayas CDMX	Mexico City	Estadio Wilfrido Massieu	13,000	2016	2019	Folded
Osos de Toluca	Toluca, State of Mexico	Fortaleza Siglo XXI	4,000	2019	2021	Folded
Pioneros de Querétaro	Querétaro City, Querétaro	Unidad Deportiva El Pueblito	4,000	2020	2020	Joined FAM
Reds de la Ciudad de México	Mexico City	Estadio ITESM CCM	2,500	2020	2023	Folded

== Rules ==
=== Game rules ===
The rules of the game are the same as those of the NFL. Some of the most notable rules are the instant replay reviews, the two-minute warning, the coach's challenge, and the requirement that receivers must have both feet touch the ground in bounds to complete a reception.

=== Salary cap ===
Like the NFL, the LFA has a salary cap. The salary cap is MX$ 2,000,000, approximately $100,000. There are four salary levels, each of which is determined by the league and is invariable for any team:

- Level 1: foreign players, 5 for each team and 2 Canadians, have the highest salary and bonuses for housing and food.
- Level 2: franchise players, an offensive and a defensive, must be Mexican and have the second-best salary.
- Level 3: starters, 17 to 20 per team, have a lower salary than level 2.
- Level 4: depth chart players receive a symbolic bonus.
- Level 5: practice squad players receive a bonus only if they get to play.

== Season format ==
=== Draft ===
Players must have finished their eligibility in college football before playing professionally. Currently, there are two collegiate leagues, the Liga Mayor ONEFA and the Liga Premier CONADEIP. In these leagues, each player can play five or six years, after which they become eligible for the LFA (they can also declare themselves eligible before finishing their period in college, but it is not usual).

Players coming from college football should express their interest in being hired by the LFA. The LFA gives the list of interested players to their teams and they are classified according to the positions they need and the level of each of the players.

Each year in January, interested players and LFA teams meet in a one-day player draft. Each team can choose a player in each of the seven rounds of the draft. The draft order is determined by each team's record from the previous year; the team that finished with the worst record has the first draft pick, the team with the second worst record has the next pick, and so on. Once all the teams have made their first selection, one round ends and the second begins, until the seventh and final round. There are also complementary rounds in case any team still requires players. The best players are very coveted, so being selected in the first round is considered a great honor, especially if it is the very first selection overall.

=== Regular season ===
The regular season up until 2020 consisted of 10 games: 6 divisional games (home and away series) and 4 interdivisional games (two away and two home). The season starts on the third weekend of February and ends in April.

For the 2022 season, there was only six games and seven teams, so every team played against each other once.

In 2023, they expanded to 10 teams and a 10-game season returned with everyone playing against each other once and then they would play a second game against a designated “rival” team for the last week of the season.

=== Postseason ===
At the end of the regular season, a direct elimination tournament called postseason or playoffs begins, in which the two best teams of each division face each other in the Division Championship in the home stadium of the team with the better record. The postseason occurs between April and May. The winners of these games go to the Tazón México bowl.

In 2022, when the league decided to have seven teams play, they did away with divisions for the year and expanded the playoff field to six teams total. This gave the top two seeds first round byes and home field advantages for the semifinals. In 2023, when three new teams were added, the playoff format remaining the same with the league's best six teams based on win-loss record would make the playoffs, and there would be no division placement.

Team	Playoff appearances
Raptors	7
Fundidores	6
Dinos	5
Mexicas	5
Caudillos	4
Mayas	4
Reyes	2
Condors	1
Galgos	1
Gallos Negros	1
Jefes	1
Reds	1
Arcángeles	1

Central Division (2017–2020)
Team	Division Championship(s)
Mayas	2 (2017, 2018)
Condors	2 (2019, 2020)

North Division (2017–2020)
Team	Division Championship(s)
Raptors	3 (2017, 2019, 2020)
Dinos	1 (2018)

First seed (regular season)
Team	Year(s)
Caudillos	3 (2023, 2024, 2026)
Mayas	1 (2016)
Dinos	1 (2022)
Mexicas	1 (2025)

=== Tazón México ===
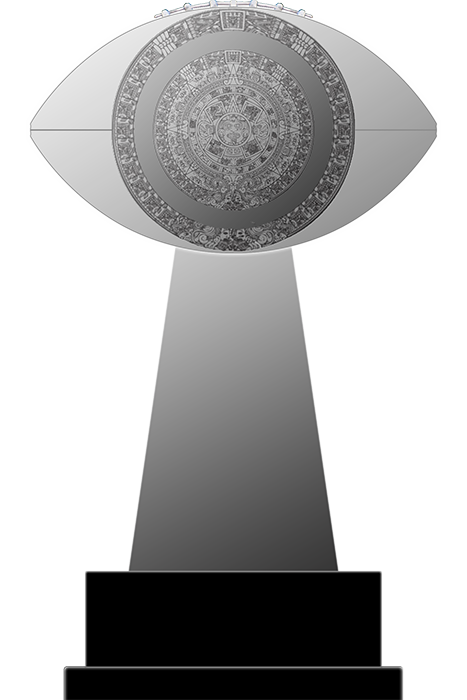
Tazon México trophy

The Tazón México (English: Mexico Bowl) is the title game for the LFA that determines the National Champion. The champions of the North Division and the Central Division meet in a neutral stadium. Each edition of the Tazón México is designated with consecutive Roman numerals, similar to the Super Bowl. In certain editions, the name of a company has been added for sponsorship reasons. It is expected that in the future the Tazón México will have a halftime show. The team with the most championships in the Tazón México is Mayas with two. The team with the most appearances in this event is Raptors with three. The current champion is the Mexicas CDMX, who defeated the Osos de Monterrey 13–12 in Tazón México X in 2025

==== Tazón México Champions ====
Season	Champion	Score	Runner up	Winning head coach	MVP
2016	Mayas	29–13	Raptors	Ernesto Alfaro	Josué Martínez (WR)
2017	Mayas	24–18	Dinos	Ernesto Alfaro	Marco García (QB)
2018	Mexicas	17–0	Raptors	Rafael Duk	Guillermo Villalobos (WR)
2019	Condors	20–16	Raptors	Félix Buendía	Diego Pérez Arvizu (QB)
2020	Season cancelled due to the COVID-19 pandemic				
2021	Season cancelled due to the COVID-19 pandemic				
2022	Fundidores	18–14	Gallos Negros	Carlos Strevel	Martín Maldonado (DL)
2023	Caudillos	10–0	Dinos	Federico Landeros Rodríguez	Octavio González (DE)
2024	Caudillos	34–14	Raptors	Federico Landeros Rodríguez	Jeremy Johnson (QB)
2025	Mexicas	13–12	Osos	Félix Buendía	Colby Campbell (LB)
2026	Caudillos	24–12	Osos	Federico Landeros Rodríguez	Dishon McNary (CB)

== Notable players ==
See Category:Liga de Fútbol Americano Profesional players

== See also ==
- International Federation of American Football
- Fútbol Americano de México
- Canadian Football League
- X-League (Japan)
- German Football League
- Austrian Football League
- Italian Football League
- Vaahteraliiga
- European Football Alliance
