= France–Mexico relations =

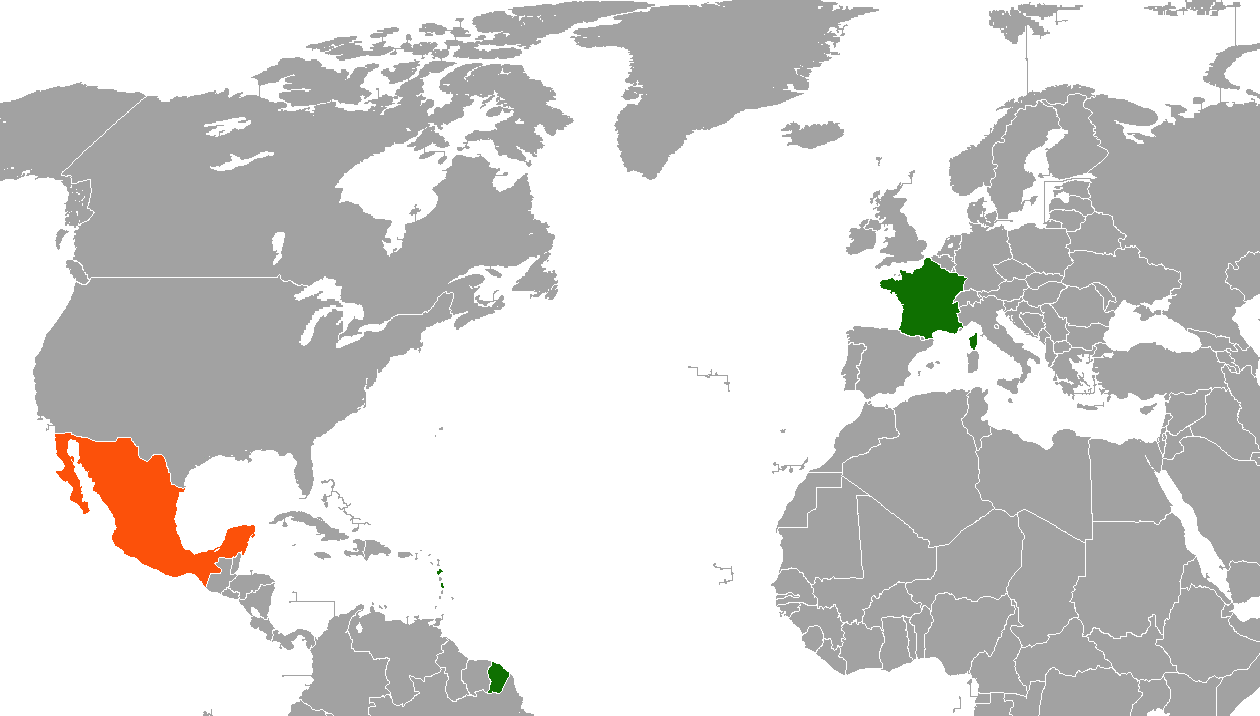

- France: Mexico

Diplomatic mission
- Embassy of France, Mexico City: Embassy of Mexico, Paris

Envoy
- Anne Grillo: Blanca Jiménez Cisneros

The nations of France and Mexico established diplomatic relations in 1830. Initially, relations between both nations were unstable as a result of France's first and second interventions in Mexico. During World War II Mexico did not recognize Vichy France, instead it maintained diplomatic relations with the French government in exile in London. Diplomatic relations were restored between both nations at the end of the war in 1945 and have continued unabated since.

Both nations are members of the G-20 major economies, Organisation for Economic Co-operation and Development and the United Nations.

== History ==
=== 1821-1860 ===
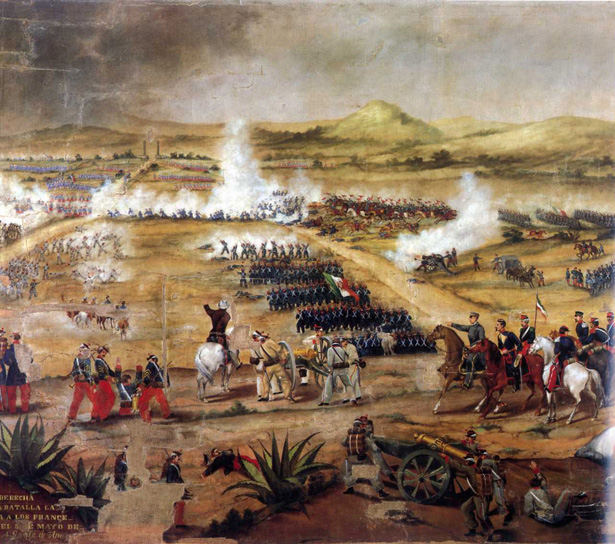
Anonymous painting depicting the Battle of Puebla in 1862, located at the Museo Nacional de las Intervenciones.

In 1821, soon after obtaining independence from the Spanish Empire, Emperor Agustín de Iturbide of Mexico sent his foreign minister to the court of King Louis XVIII to ask for recognition of the newly independent nation; however, King Louis XVIII refused to recognize Mexico because of its alliance with Spain. On 26 November 1826, France proposed resolving the problem of recognition by establishing trade relations with a Mexican company, thus establishing unofficial relations with Mexico. It was not until September 1830 that France recognized and established diplomatic relations with Mexico, following the July Revolution, the forced abdication of King Charles X, and the removal of the House of Bourbon from power. That same year, both nations opened resident diplomatic legations in each country's capital, respectively.

During the early years of their diplomatic relations, Mexico and France were not always on friendly terms, particularly with the beginning of the Pastry War (November 1838 - March 1839), known also as the First French intervention in Mexico; where France invaded Mexico in order to collect re-compensation for property damaged and or looted by Mexican forces. During the war, France (with the assistance of the United States) blockaded Mexican ports thus crippling the economy. Three months later, Mexico agreed to pay France 600,000 pesos in compensation.

=== 1861-1867 ===
The Second French intervention in Mexico began in December 1861, when Emperor Napoleon III invaded Mexico on the pretext that Mexico had refused to pay its foreign debt, though, in reality, the Emperor wanted to take advantage of the American Civil War to expand his empire in Latin-America. After a successful French invasion of Mexico, Napoléon III installed his Austrian cousin, Maximilian of the House of Habsburg, as Emperor of Mexico in 1864.

For several years, Mexican rebels under President Benito Juárez and with additional support from the United States fought against French and royalist troops. Once the Union won the American Civil War in 1865, the U.S. allowed supporters of President Juárez to openly purchase weapons and ammunition and issued stronger warnings to Paris. The United States sent general William Tecumseh Sherman with 50,000 combat veterans to the Mexican border to emphasize that time had run out on the French intervention. Napoleon III had no choice but to withdraw his outnumbered army in disgrace. Emperor Maximilian refused exile and was executed by the Mexican government in 1867 in Querétaro thus ending the Second Mexican Empire.

The events of the 1860 are commemorated in both France and Mexico to this day. In Mexico, Cinco de Mayo commemorates the Mexicans' victory over the French troops at the Battle of Puebla (5 May 1862). Another defeat of the French – the destruction of the small, but heroic, French Foreign Legion force at the Battle of Camarón (30 April 1863) – is annually commemorated by the French Foreign Legion as the "Camerone Day".

=== 20th Century ===
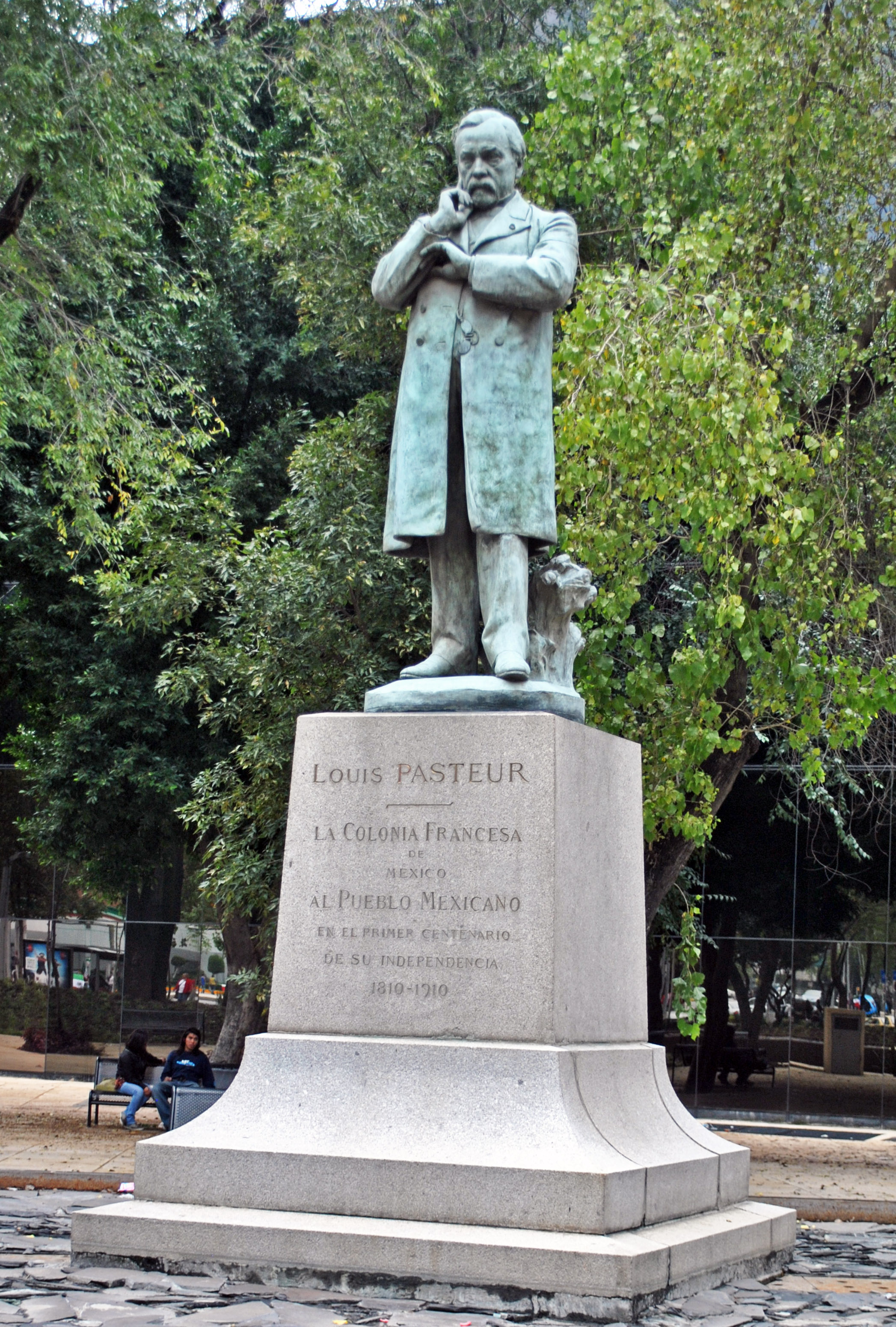
Sculpture of Louis Pasteur donated by the French community of Mexico City in celebration of Mexico's Centennial of Independence.

In 1911, Mexican President Porfirio Díaz, a former general who fought against the French during the Second French Intervention in Mexico and a Francophile, left Mexico for exile in Paris where he died in 1915 and is buried at the Montparnasse Cemetery.

In December 1926, the Mexican government purchased property on Avenue du Président-Wilson and on Rue de Longchamp which are now the current Residence and embassy of Mexico in Paris. In 1940, during World War II, Mexico opened a consulate in Marseille to represent Mexico in Vichy France and was led by Gilberto Bosques Saldívar. As consul, Bosques Saldívar issued approximately 40,000 visas to Jews and Spanish Republicans fleeing to Mexico. In 1943, Bosques, his family, and 40 consular staff members were arrested by the Gestapo and detained in a "hotel-prison" in Germany for a year before being released in 1944.

In 1942, Mexico severed diplomatic relations with the government of Vichy France and instead maintained diplomatic relations with the French government in exile (also known as Free France) led by General Charles de Gaulle in London. Full diplomatic relations were restored between both nations at the end of the war in Europe in 1945.

=== 21st century ===
In December 2005, a French citizen called Florence Cassez was arrested in Mexico and charged with kidnapping, organized crime and possession of firearms. She was found guilty by a Mexican court and sentenced to 60 years imprisonment. Cassez always maintained her innocence which began a diplomatic dispute between Mexico and France. At the time, President Nicolas Sarkozy asked the Mexican government to allow Cassez to serve her sentence in France, however the requests were denied.

In 2009, Mexico cancelled its participation of 2011 "The Year of Mexico in France" (350 events, films, and symposium planned) as the French president Sarkozy declared that this year-long event was going to be dedicated to Cassez, and each individual event would have some sort of remembrance of the Frenchwoman. In January 2013, the Mexican Supreme Court ordered her release and Cassez was flown immediately back to France. Since her release, France pledged to assist Mexico in creating a Gendarmerie in Mexico at the request of President Enrique Peña Nieto.

On 6 July 2017, Presidents Enrique Peña Nieto and French President Emmanuel Macron met in Paris, before the G-20 summit in Hamburg, Germany. During their meeting, the leaders exchanged their views on trade, multilateralism, the fight against terrorism and climate change.

In July 2021, Mexican Foreign Minister Marcelo Ebrard paid a visit to France and met with his counterpart Jean-Yves Le Drian and with President Emmanuel Macron. During the visit, both nations discussed the current COVID-19 pandemic and both nations signed a declaration of intent on strengthening cooperation against the illicit trafficking of cultural property, in order to identify mechanisms to protect and curb the traffic and pillage of cultural property illegally extracted from Mexico and subsequently marketed.

In November 2025, French President Emmanuel Macron paid a visit to Mexico and met with President Claudia Sheinbaum.

== High-level visits ==
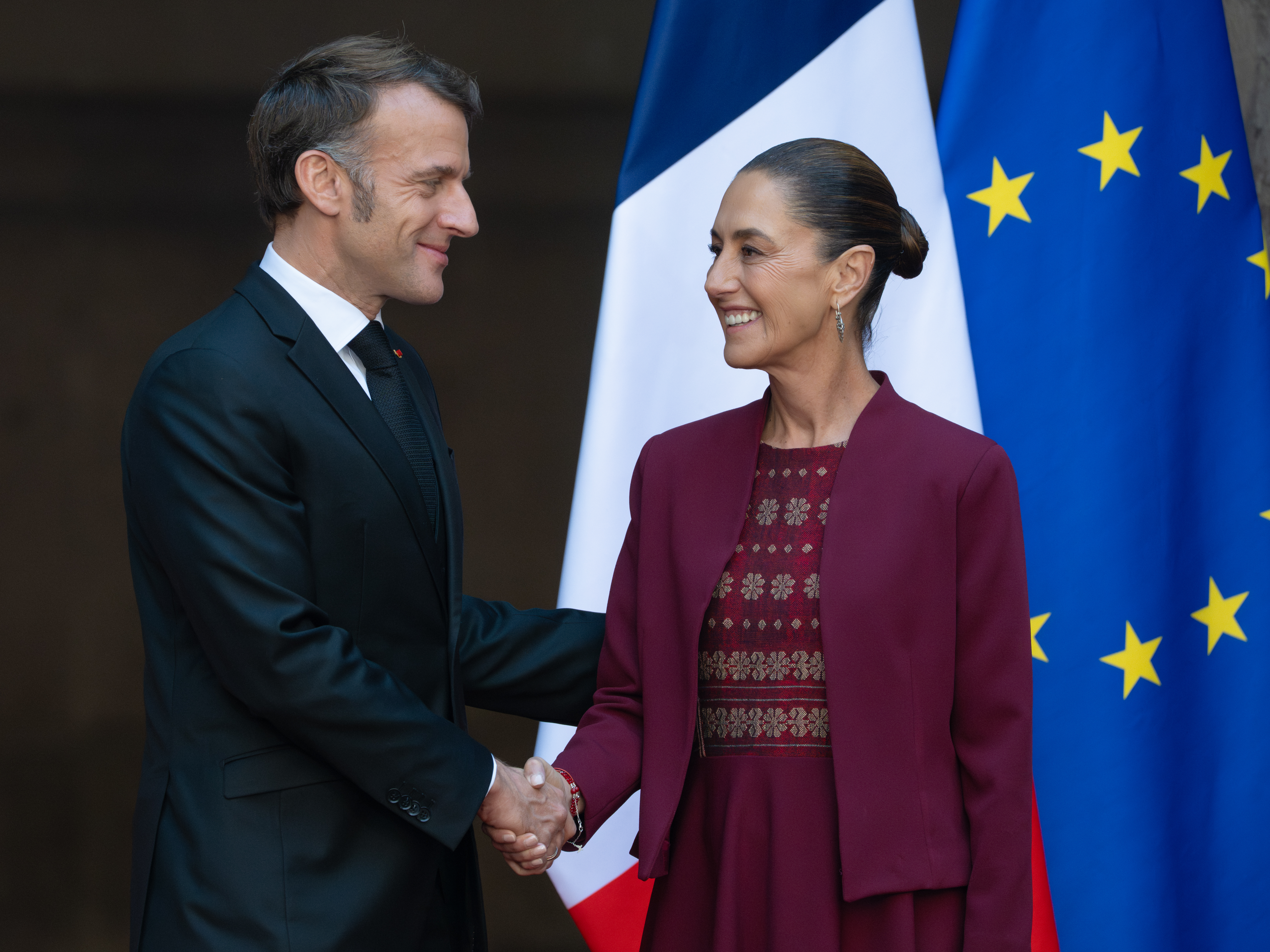
President Emmanuel Macron and President Claudia Sheinbaum in Mexico City, November 2025.

High-level visits from France to Mexico

- President Charles de Gaulle (1964)
- President Valéry Giscard d'Estaing (1979)
- President François Mitterrand (1981)
- President Jacques Chirac (1998, 2002, 2004)
- President Nicolas Sarkozy (2009)
- President François Hollande (2012, 2014)
- President Emmanuel Macron (2025)

High-level visits from Mexico to France

- President Adolfo López Mateos (1963)
- President Luis Echeverría Álvarez (1973)
- President José López Portillo (1980)
- President Miguel de la Madrid Hurtado (1985)
- President Carlos Salinas de Gortari (1989, 1992)
- President Ernesto Zedillo (1997)
- President Vicente Fox (2001, May and November 2002, 2003)
- President Felipe Calderón (2007, 2011)
- President Enrique Peña Nieto (July and November 2015, July and December 2017)

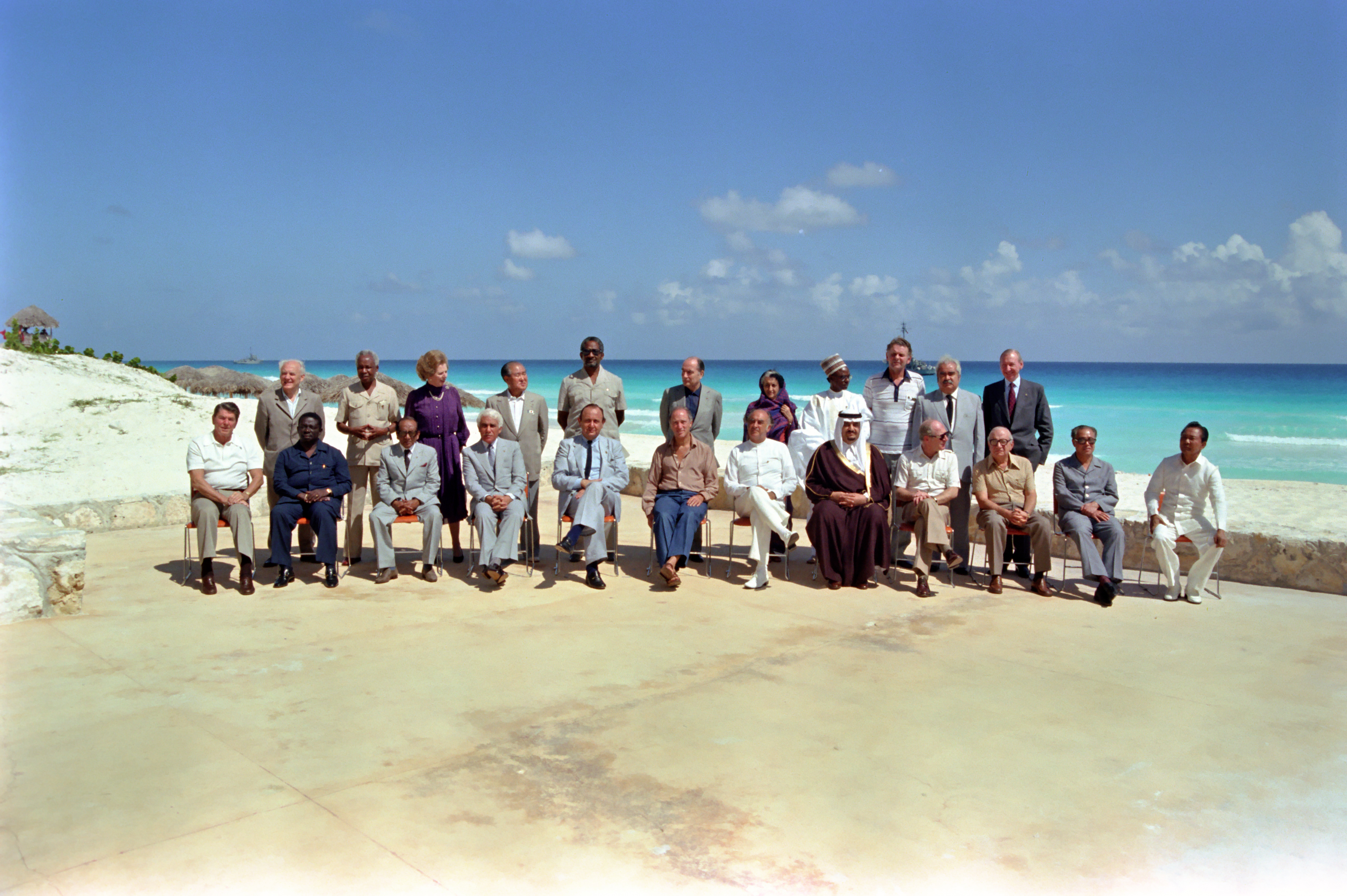
President José López Portillo and President François Mitterrand attending the North–South Summit in Cancún; 1981.

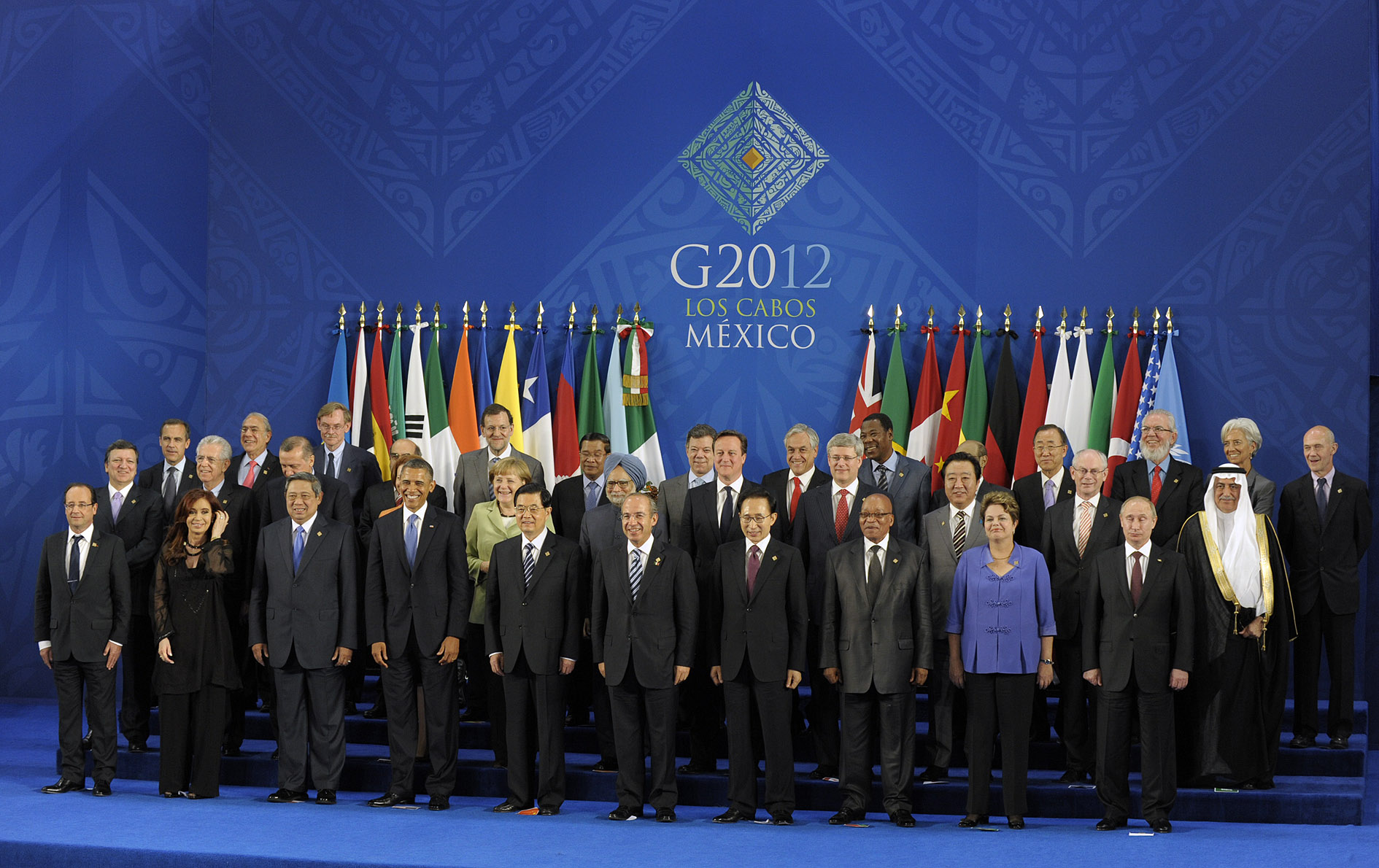
President Felipe Calderón and President François Hollande in Los Cabos; 2012.

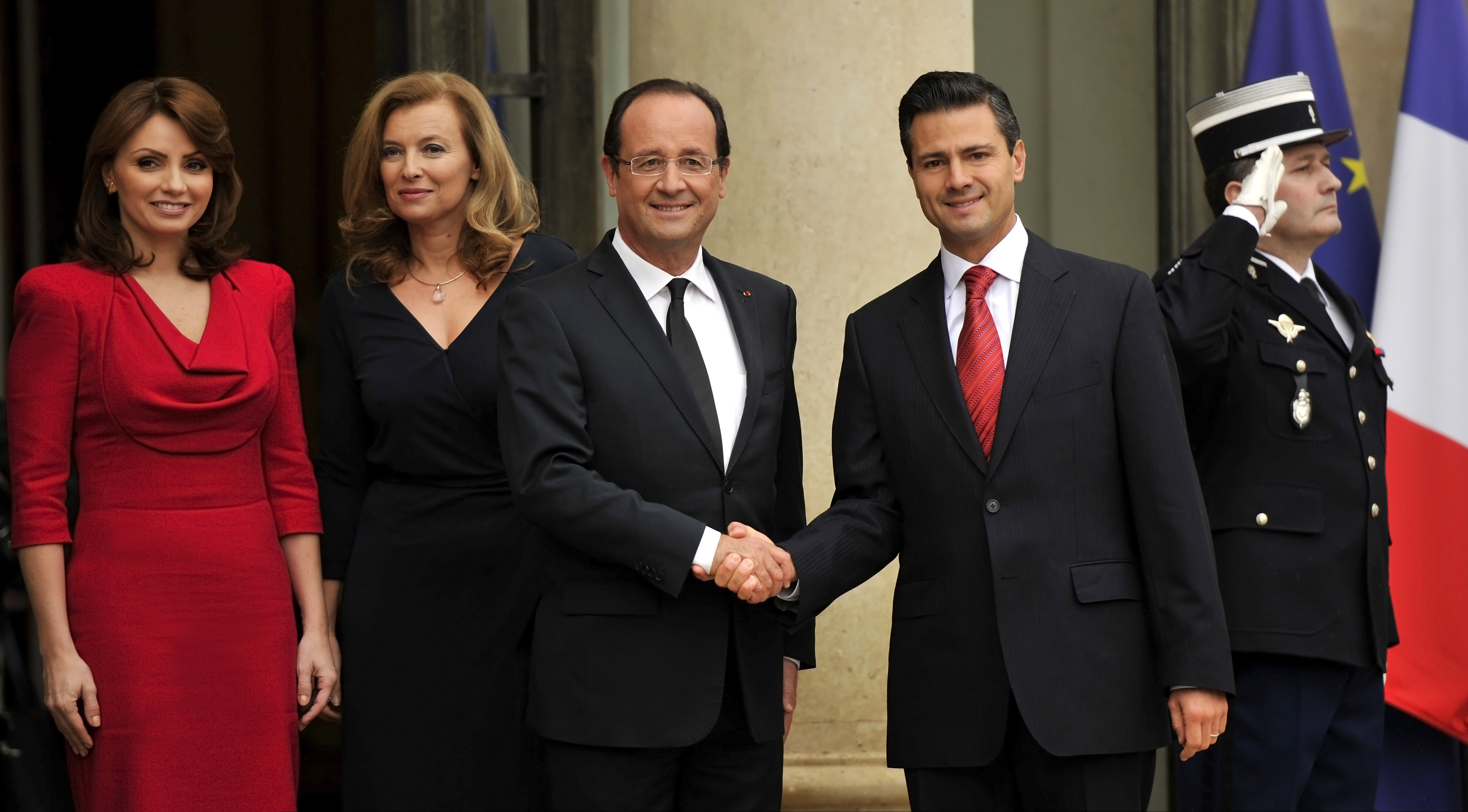
President François Hollande and President Enrique Peña Nieto in Paris; 2012.

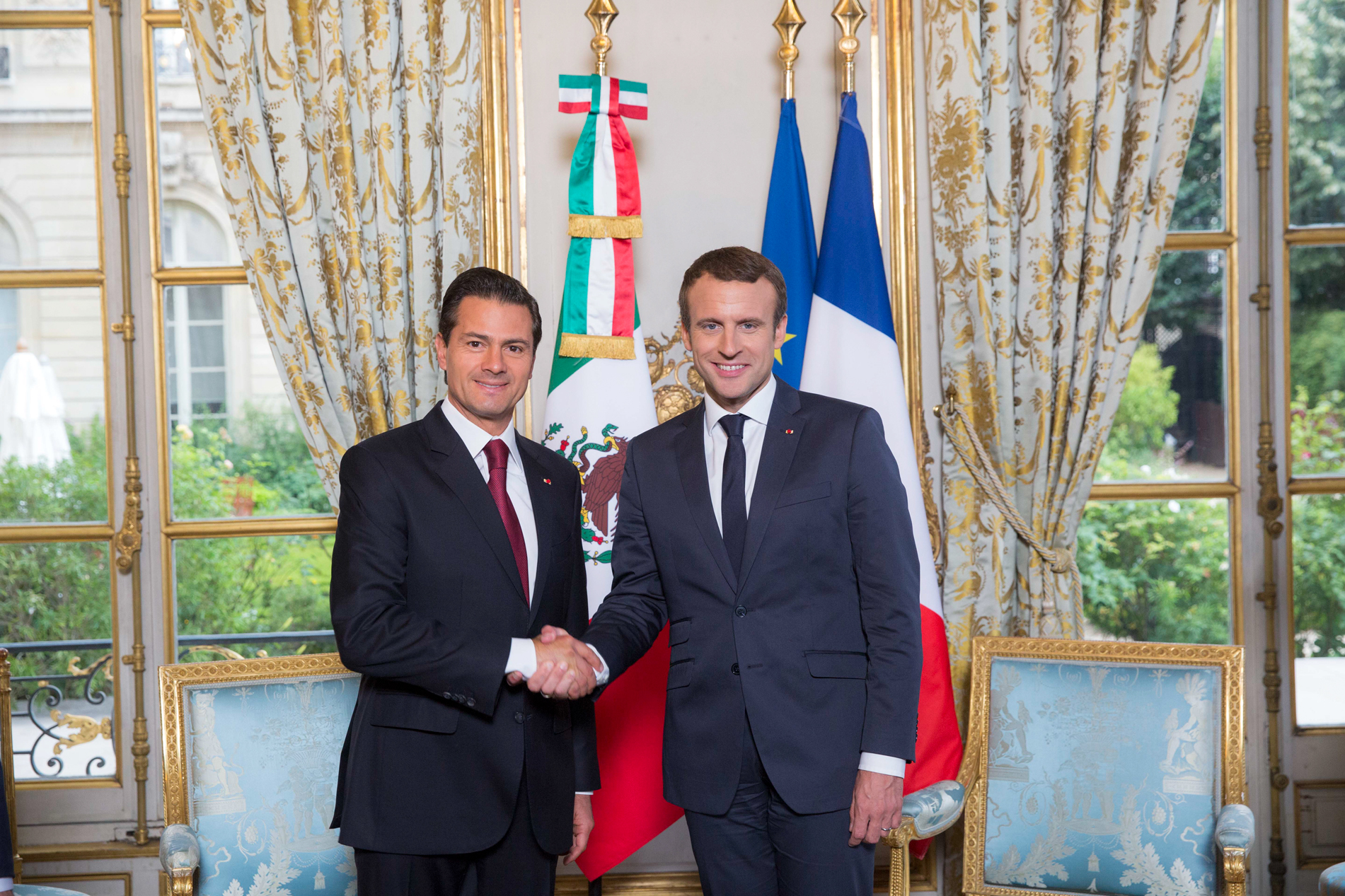
President Enrique Peña Nieto and President Emmanuel Macron in Paris, 2017.

== Bilateral agreements ==
Both nations have signed several bilateral agreements such as an Agreement on Favorable Nation (1827); Agreement on Friendship, Commerce and Navigation (1886); Agreement on Copyright Protection (1950); Trade Agreement (1951); Agreement on Air Transportation (1952); Agreement on Scientific and Technical Cooperation (1965); Agreement on Economic Cooperation (1981); Agreement of Cooperation between Pemex and Total S.A. (1981); Franco-Mexican Declaration on Political Violence in El Salvador (1981); Agreement on work and holiday visas (2011); Agreement on Cooperation in the peaceful uses of Nuclear Energy (2015); Agreement on Social Security (2015); Agreement on Mutual Academic Recognition (2015); Aeronautical Agreement (2015) and an Agreement of Cooperation between French and Mexican Universities (2015).

== Tourism and Transportation ==
In 2022, 258,000 French citizens visited Mexico for tourism. That same year, 500,000 Mexican citizens visited France for tourism. There are direct flights between France and Mexico with the following airlines: Aeroméxico, Air Caraïbes and Air France; with direct flights available from Cancún and Mexico City international airports to Paris.

== Border disputes ==
France and Mexico do not presently share a land border, although in the 18th-century French Louisiana did border New Spain.

The closest land to the French Pacific Clipperton Island is Mexico, and the two countries disputed the island's ownership for several decades, until international arbitration finally awarded it to France in 1931.

== Trade relations ==
In 1997, Mexico signed a Free Trade Agreement with the European Union (which includes France). In 2023, two-way trade between France and Mexico amounted to US$5.6 billion. France's main exports to Mexico include: medicine, vaccinations, automobile parts, helicopters, airplanes, perfumes, make-up and electrical equipment. Mexico's main export product to France include: telephones, petroleum based products, computers, medical devices, turbines, cables and automobile parts. Over 550 French companies operate in Mexico and several Mexican multinational companies operate in France.

== Resident diplomatic missions ==
of France in Mexico

- Mexico City (Embassy)
- Mexico City (Consulate-General)
- Monterrey (Consulate-General)

of Mexico in France

- Paris (Embassy)
- Paris (Consulate-General)
- Strasbourg (Liaison office)

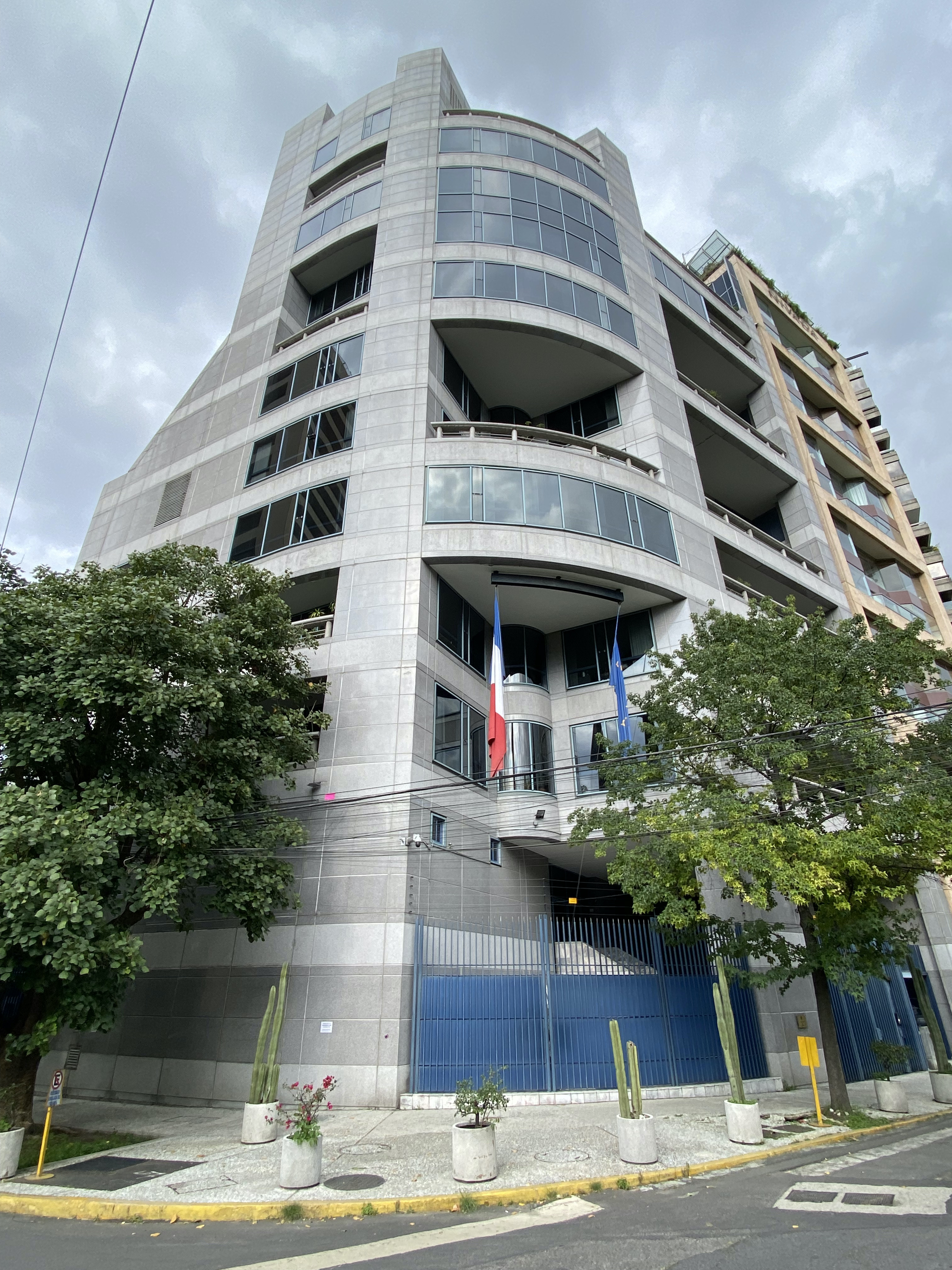
Embassy of France in Mexico City

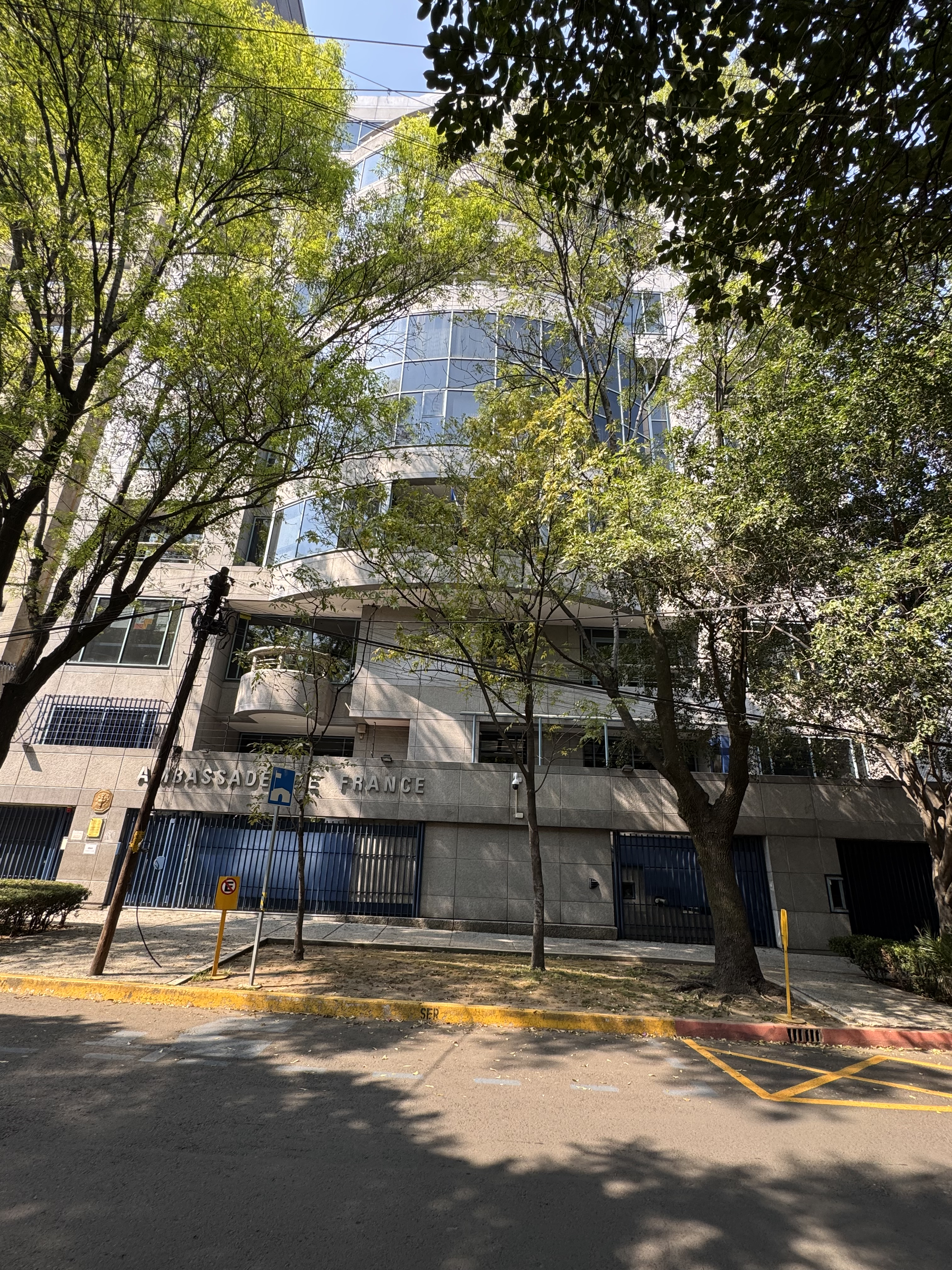
Consulate-General of France in Mexico City

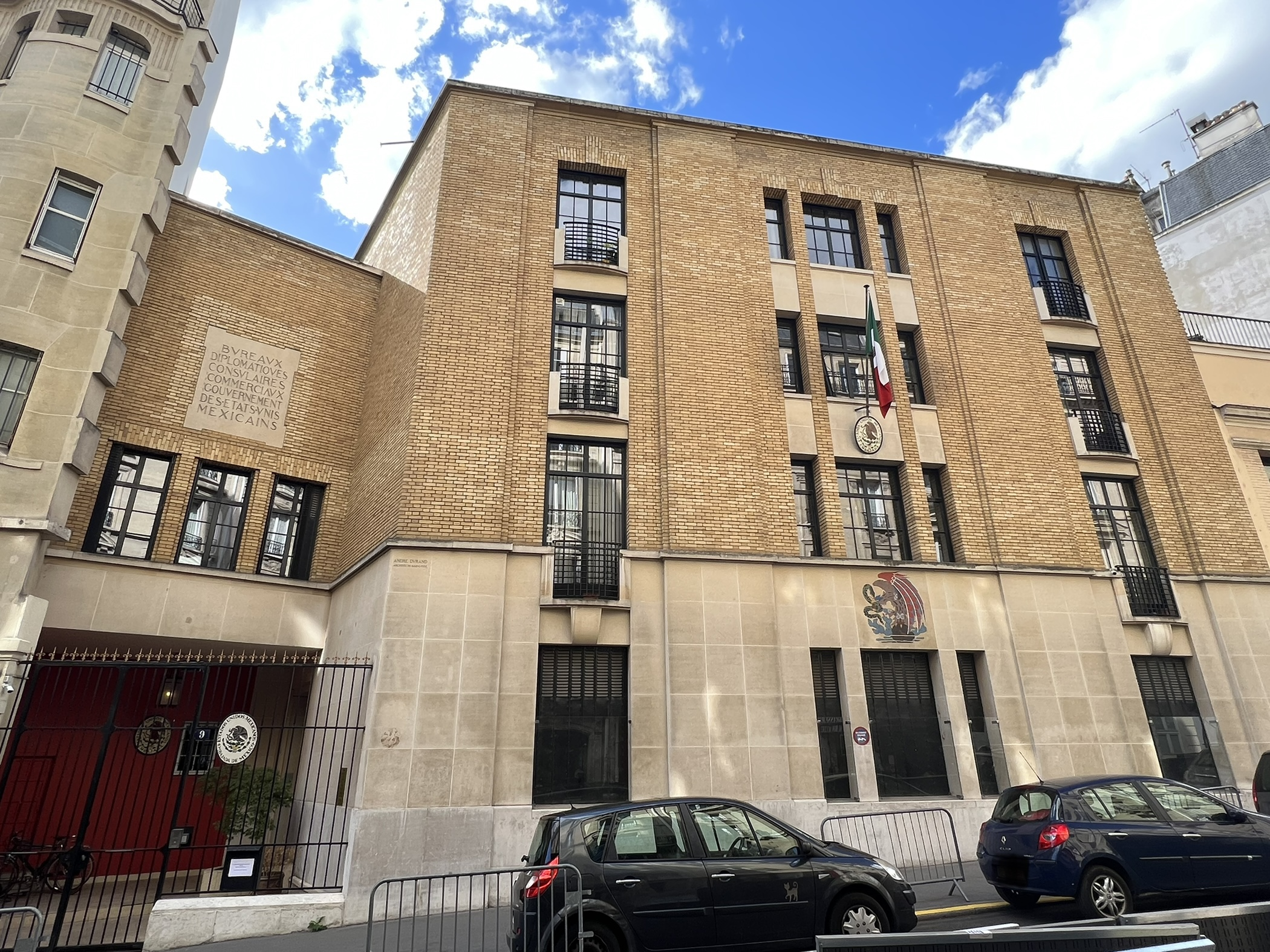
Embassy of Mexico in Paris

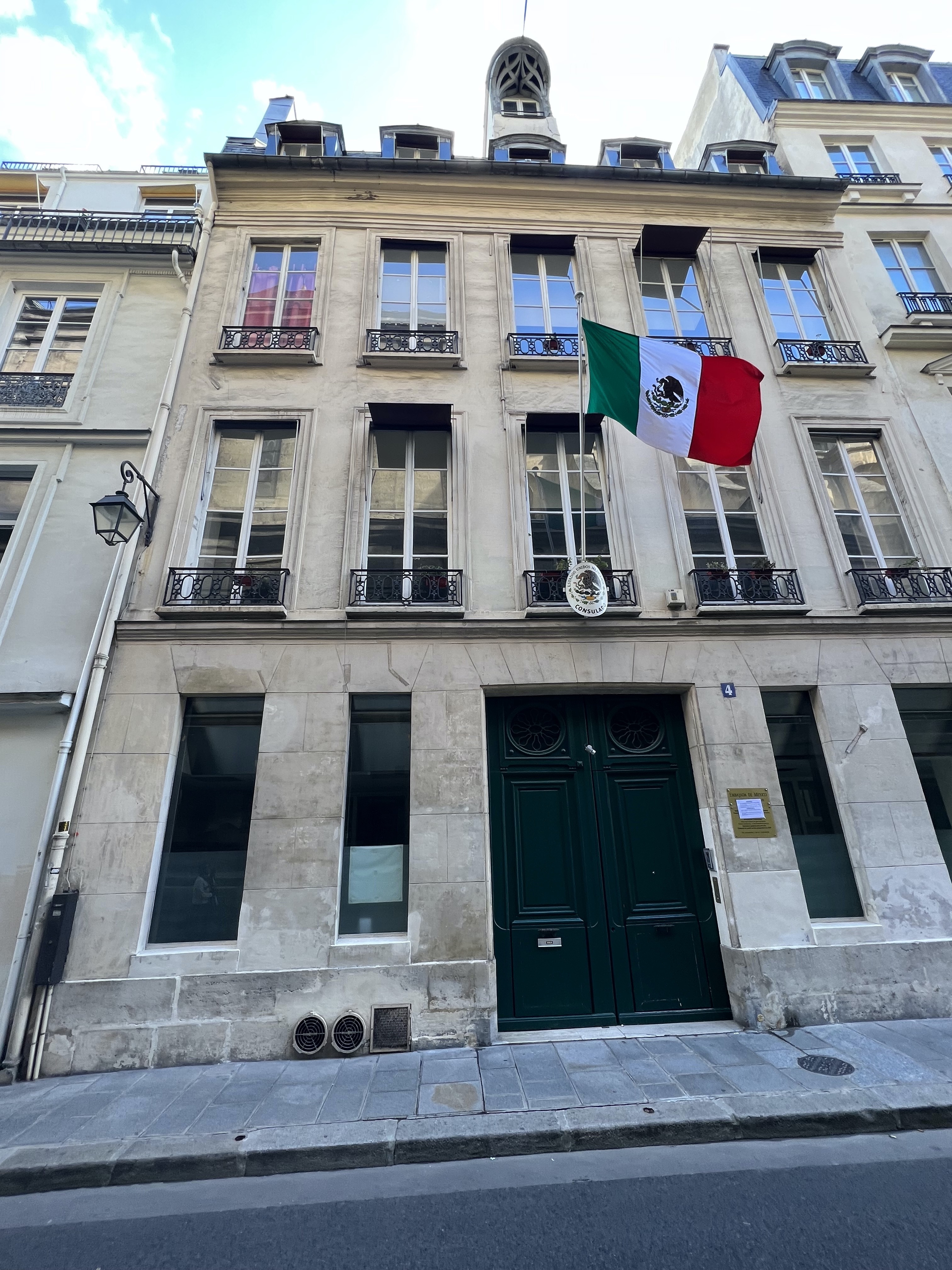
Consulate-General of Mexico in Paris

== Gallery ==
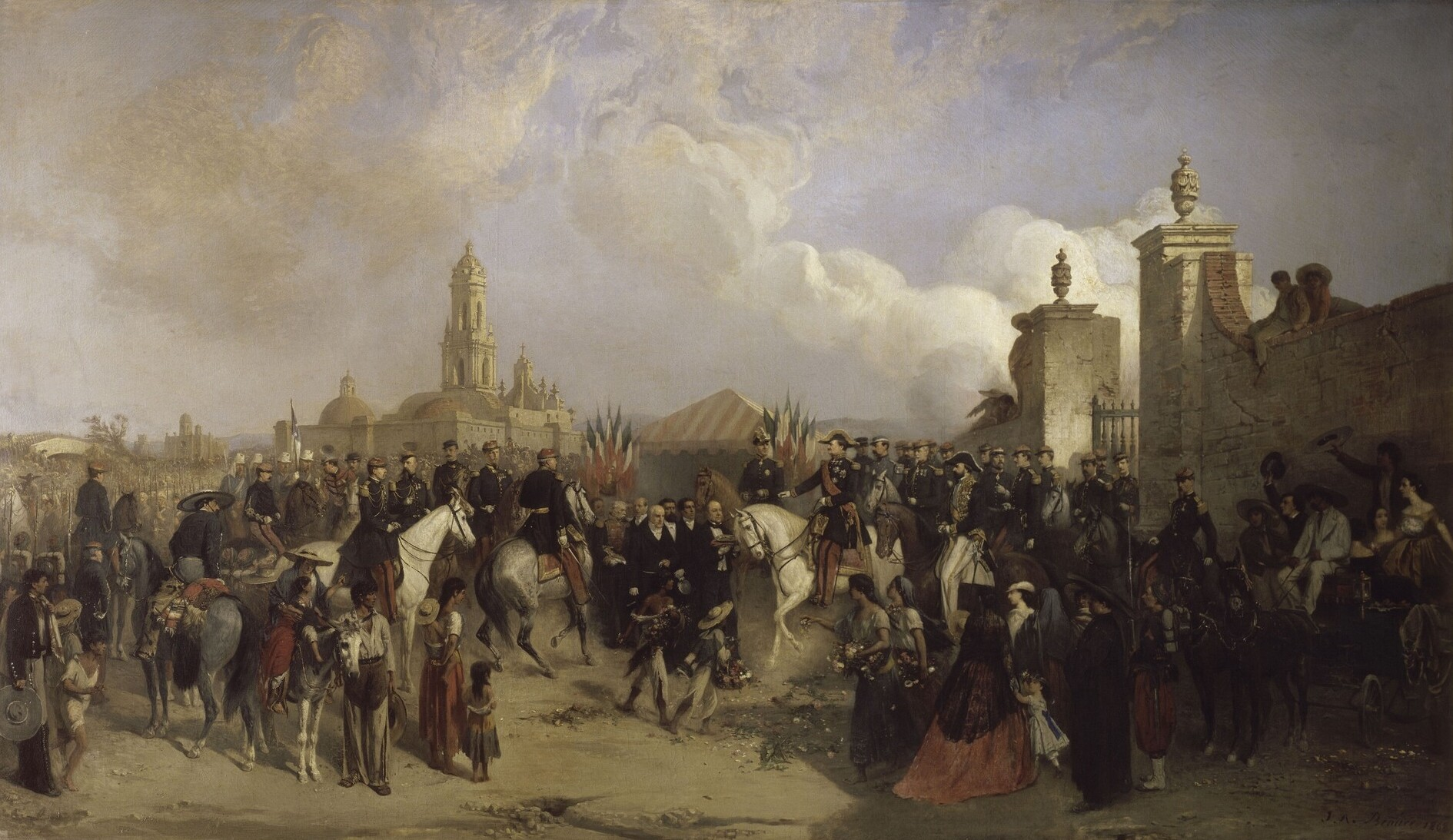
Arrival of the French army to Mexico City in 1863

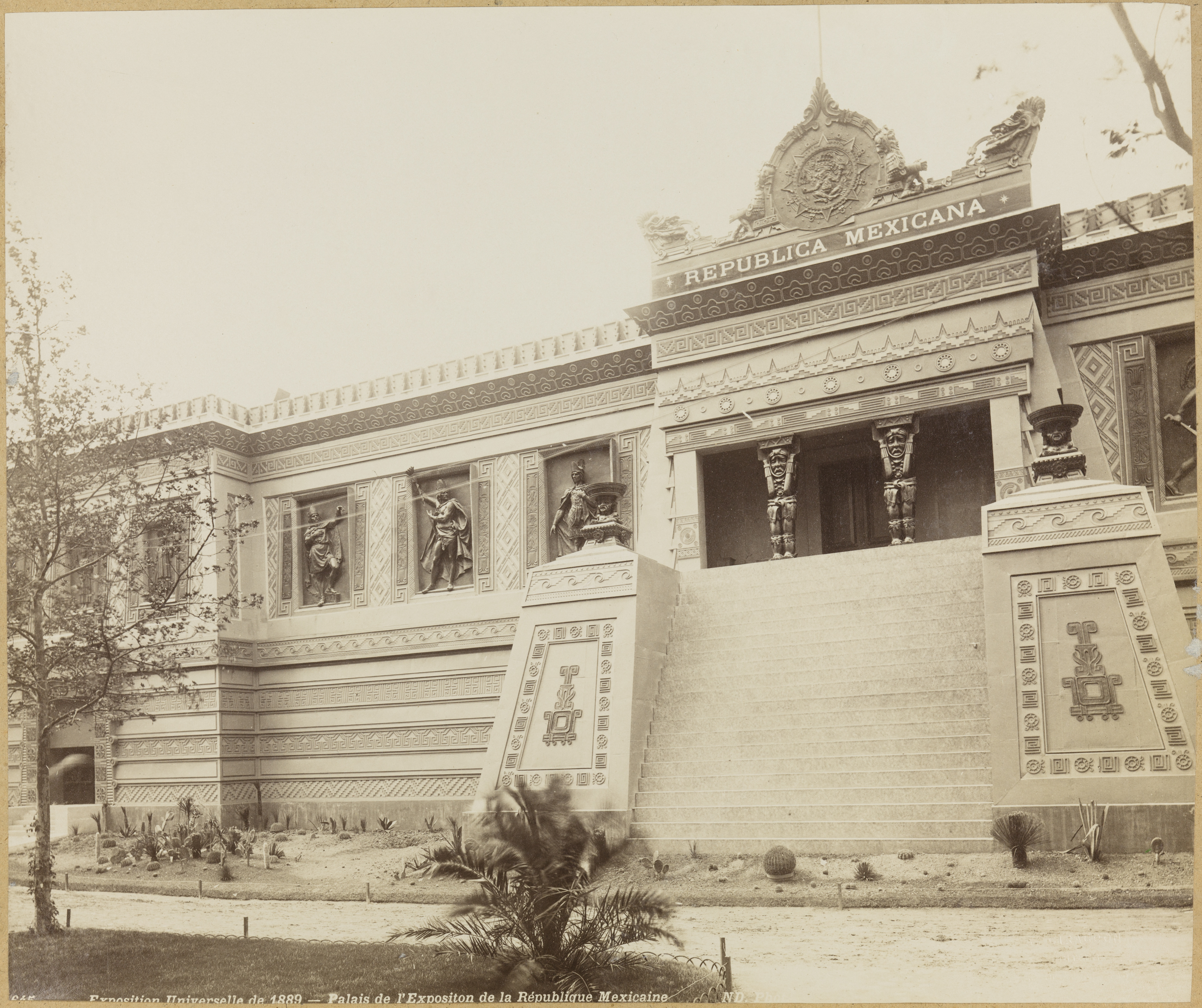
Pavilion of Mexico at the Exposition Universelle in Paris, 1889

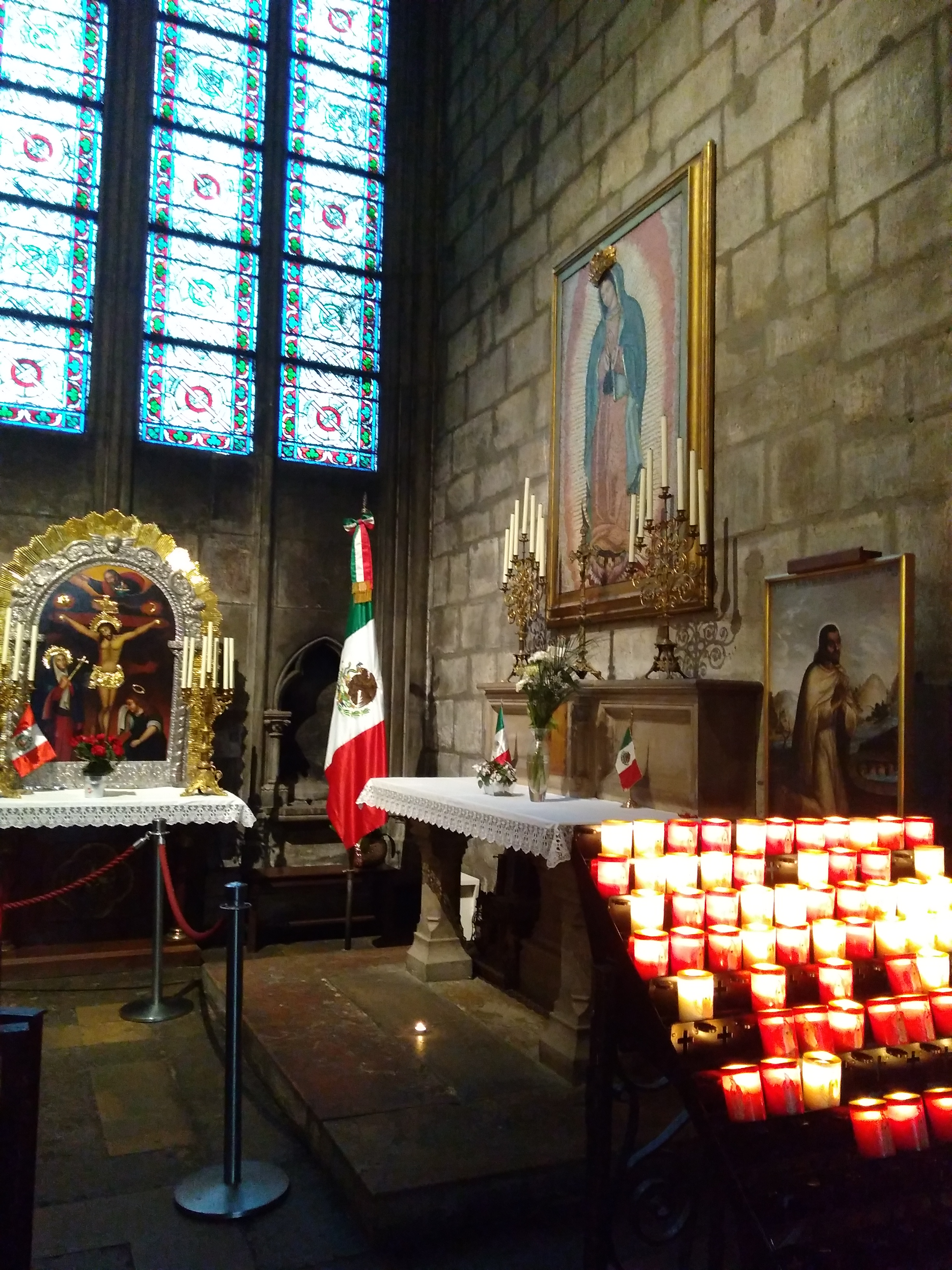
Shrine to Our Lady of Guadalupe in Notre-Dame in Paris

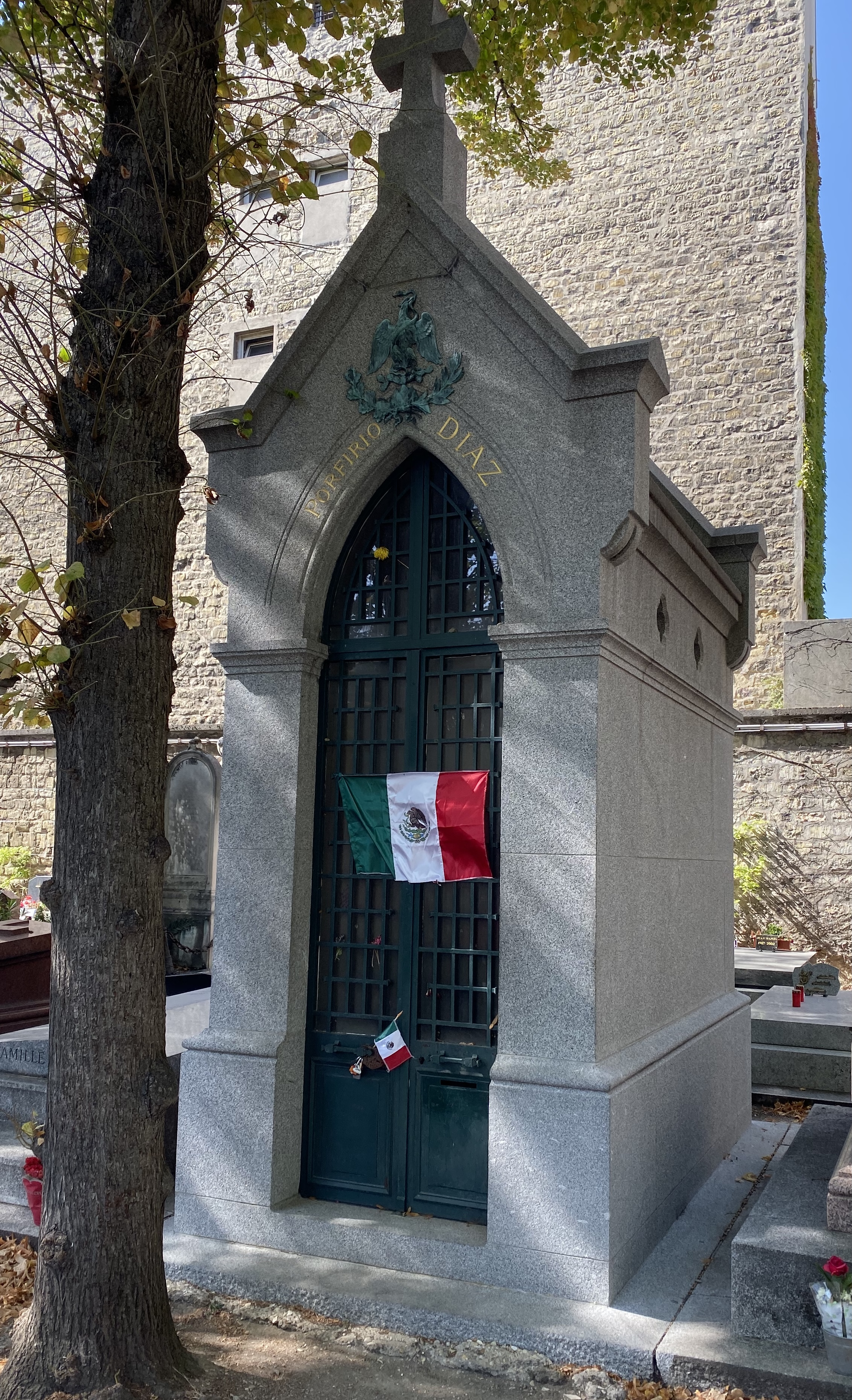
Tomb of Mexican President Porfirio Díaz in Paris

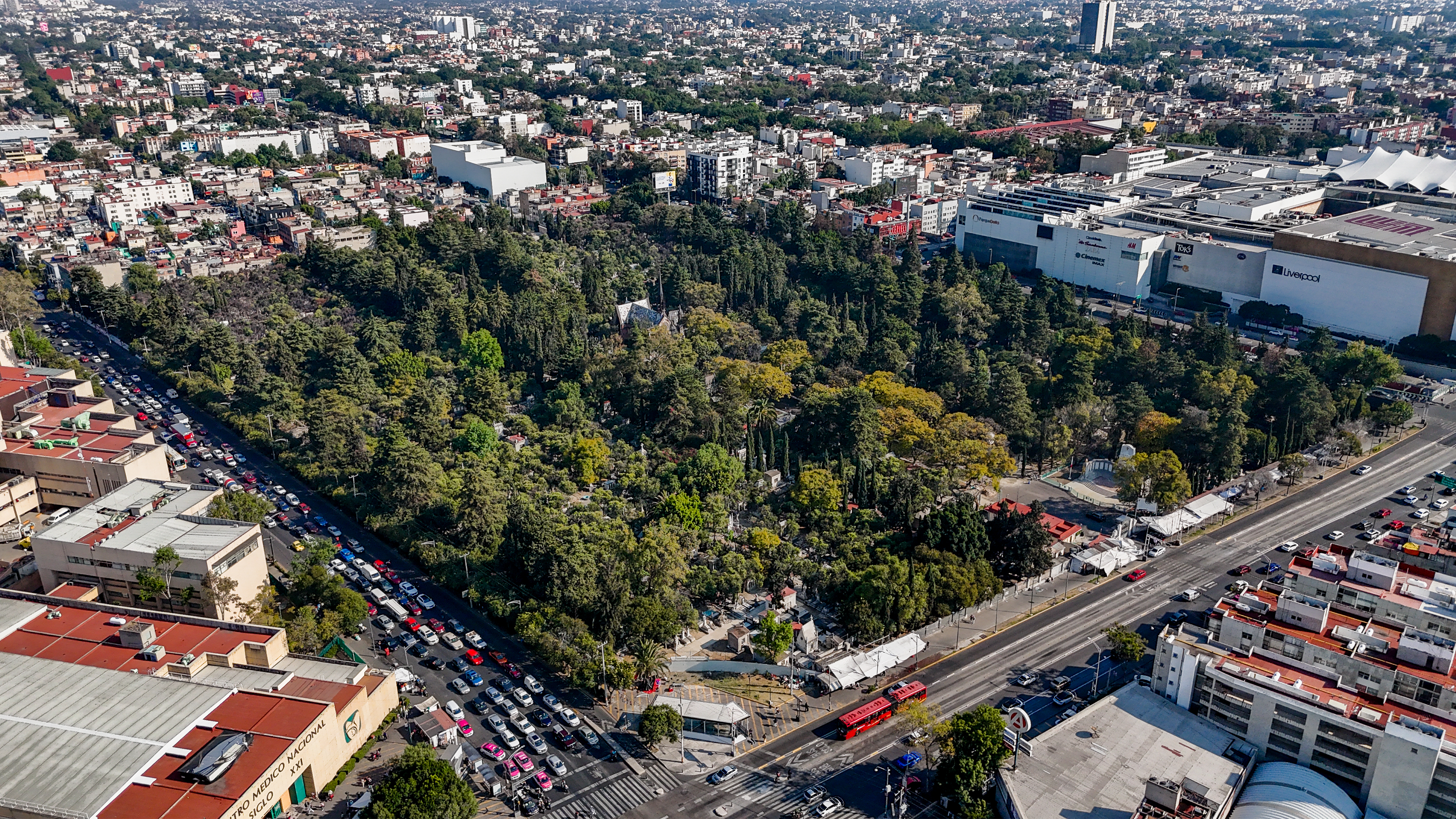
The Panteón Francés in Mexico City

Place de Mexico in Paris

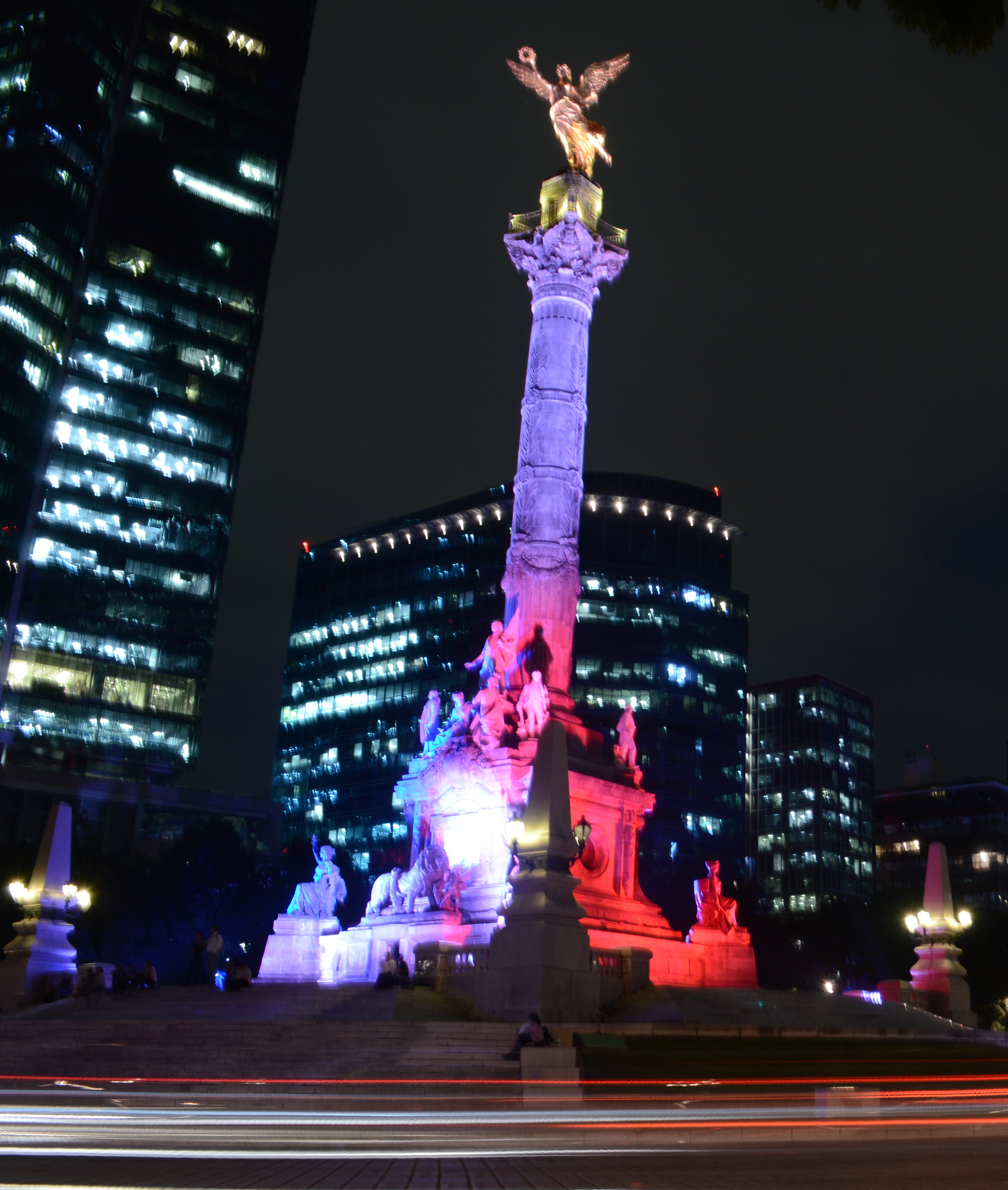
The Angel of Independence in Mexico City in the French tricolors in honor of the November 2015 Paris attacks

Mexican Naval training vessel, the ARM Cuauhtémoc, in Brest

== See also ==
- French Mexicans
- Lycée Français de Guadalajara
- Lycée Franco-Mexicain
- Mexicans in France
- Panteón Francés
