= French Mexicans =

French Mexicans franco-mexicanos Franco-Mexicains
Total population
- 30,000 to 60,000 descendants

Regions with significant populations
- Jalisco, Guanajuato, Mexico City, Puebla, Veracruz, Michoacan, Querétaro, Nuevo León

Languages
- Majority Mexican Spanish. Minority speaks French.

Religion
- Predominantly Roman Catholicism

Related ethnic groups
- French diaspora

French Mexicans (French: Franco-Mexicains, Spanish: franco-mexicanos or Spanish: galo-mexicanos) are Mexican citizens of full or partial French ancestry. French nationals make up the second largest European immigrant group in Mexico, after Spaniards.

== Migration history ==
French immigration to Mexico started only on a small scale before Mexico became an independent country in 1821, as foreign immigration was sometimes prohibited by Spanish authorities under the colonial regime. The first wave of French immigration to Mexico occurred in the 1830s, following the country's recognition by France, with the foundation of a French colony on the Coatzacoalcos River, in the state of Veracruz. In total, 668 settlers were brought from France to populate the colony. Most of them went back to France as the project of colonization failed, but some permanently settled in Mexico. In 1833, another colony was founded in the state of Veracruz as well, under the name of Jicaltepec. A second wave of French immigration came to Mexico at the end of the 1840s, during the California Gold Rush (at the time gold was discovered, California was still part of the Mexican territory). As a consequence, in 1849 French represented the second foreign community in Mexico after Spaniards. Between 1850 and 1914, Mexico received 11,000 French immigrants.

According to the 2010 Census, French people form the second largest European emigrant community in Mexico after Spaniards, and eleventh overall immigrant community. There are around 9,500 French nationals registered in Mexico and about 6,000 to 7,000 Frenchmen unregistered. Two thirds of them are Mexicans of French ancestry holding double nationality. Many Mexicans of French descent live in cities and states such as Zacatecas, San Luis Potosí, Aguascalientes, Veracruz, Guanajuato, Jalisco, Puebla, Queretaro and Mexico City.

== Second Mexican Empire ==
Most French Mexicans descend from immigrants and soldiers that settled in Mexico during the Second Mexican Empire, headed by Maximilian I of Mexico and masterminded by Emperor Napoleon III of France and the Mexican conservatives in the 1850’s to create a Latin empire in the New World (indeed responsible for coining the term of Amérique latine, or 'Latin America'). Emperor Maximilian's consort, Carlota of Mexico, a princess of Belgium, was a granddaughter of Louis-Philippe of France.

== The "Barcelonnettes" ==
The largest wave of immigration from France to Mexico came from the city of Barcelonnette, in Alpes-de-Haute-Provence. Between 1850 and 1950, 5,000 to 6,000 inhabitants of the Ubaye Valley immigrated to Mexico. Many established textile businesses between Mexico and France. While 90% stayed in Mexico, some returned to Barcelonette, and from 1880 to 1930, built grand mansions called Maisons Mexicaines and left a mark upon the city. Today, there are 60,000 descendants of the "Barcelonnettes". Barcelonnette-founded Palacio de Hierro and Liverpool continue as nationwide chains of department stores.

== French settlement in Veracruz ==
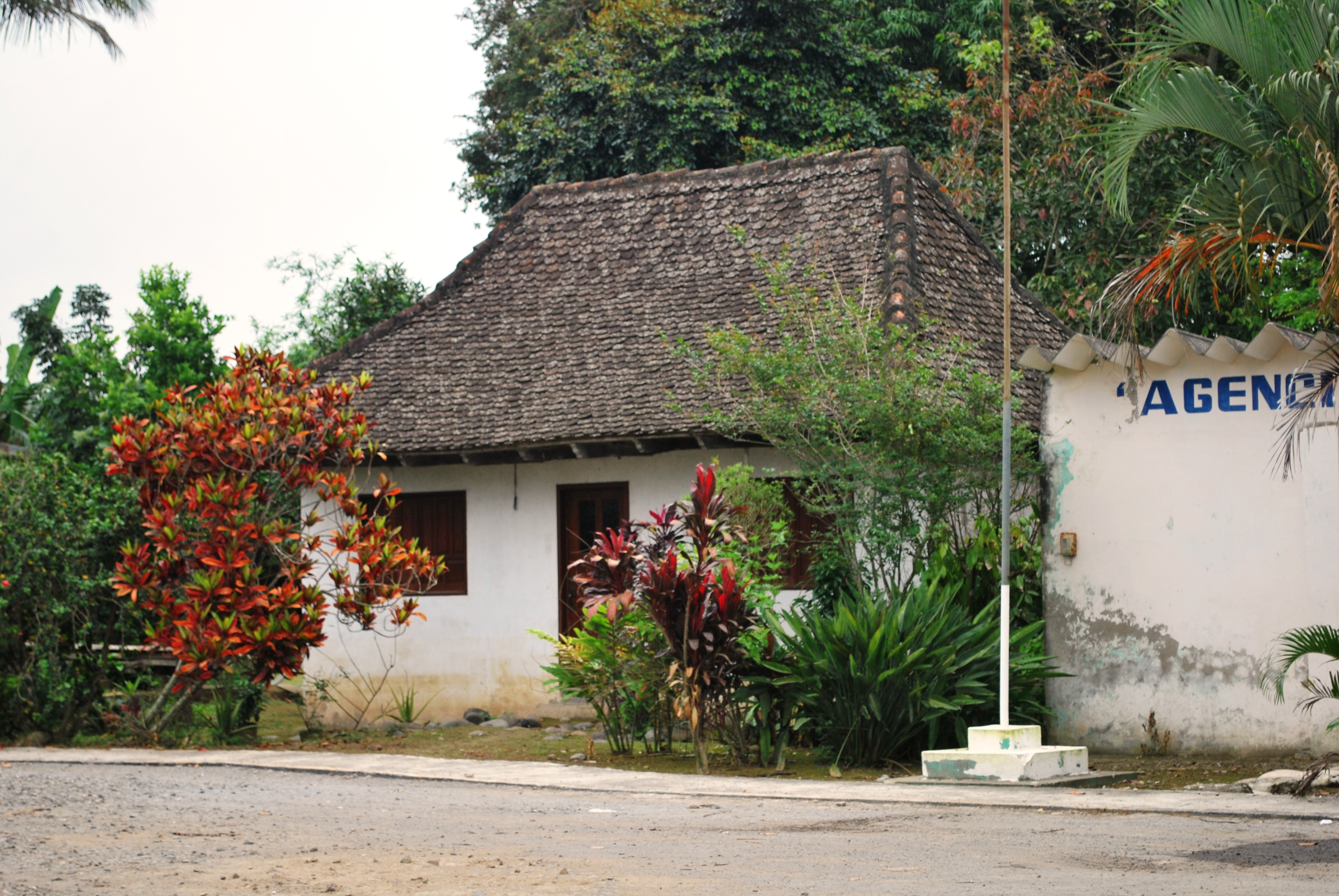
French home in Paso de Telaya, San Rafael, Veracruz.

In 1833, 98 persons coming from Haute-Saône, Haute-Marne, Côte-d'Or and Yonne settled in a colony called Jicaltepec, in the state of Veracruz. In 1874, the community resettled on the other bank of the river, in San Rafael. From 1880 to 1900 the population of the colony grew from 800 to 1,000 inhabitants. There are now around 10,000 French Mexicans in the state of Veracruz.

== Involvement in World War II ==
Jean René Champion, a Mexican of French ancestry, was the first Free French Forces (Forces Françaises Libres) officer to enter Paris on the day when the city was liberated from the Nazis on August 26, 1944.

== French contributions to Mexican society ==
The French introduced cultural traits adopted by the Mexican culture and may have helped coin the term “Mariachi”, though it is not certain. The word “Mariachi” may have originated during French Napoleonic rule in the 1860s since French settler families used the music during weddings (marriage). Clark attributes this to "phonetic coincidence" (Clark, 1996). An important culinary contribution was the bolillo, which is now widely used for the torta. The French also heavily influenced Mexico's pan dulce.

== Education ==
There are two French international schools in Mexico:

- Lycée Franco-Mexicain (campuses in Mexico City and Cuernavaca)
- Lycée Français de Guadalajara

== Notable French-Mexicans ==
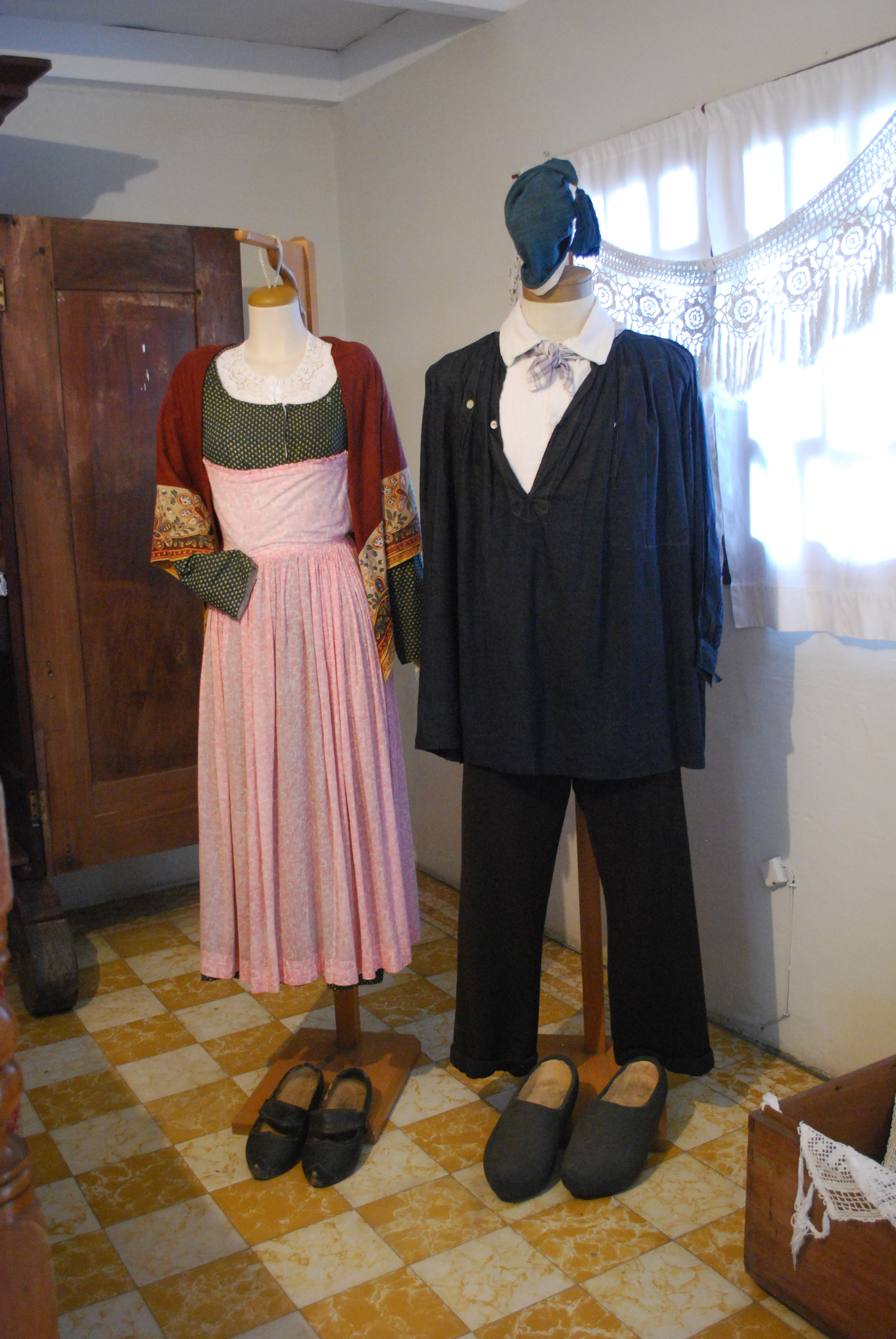
Clothing worn by 19th century French migrants

- Luis G. Abbadie, writer
- León Aillaud, governor of Veracruz
- Miirrha Alhambra, French-born Mexican pianist
- Pita Amor, poet, of French descent
- Ramón Arnaud, Mexican Army and the last Mexican governor of Clipperton Island; of French descent
- Aracely Arámbula, Mexican actress, model, and singer; of French and Basque descent
- Alberto Baillères, third-richest man in Mexico
- Alejandro Baillères, CEO of Grupo Nacional Provincial, son of Alberto Baillères
- Jean-Louis Berlandier, scientist
- Angelique Boyer, Mexican, French-born telenovela actress
- Linda Christian, movie actress, of French descent
- Manuel Clouthier, businessman and politician
- Tatiana Clouthier, politician, writer, and entrepreneur
- Carlos Loret de Mola, Mexican journalist of French descent
- Edgar de Evia, Mexican-born American photographer
- Eugenio Derbez, actor, comedian, and film director; of French descent on his great grandmother's side (Gilly)
- Consuelo Duval, Mexican actress of French descent
- Yolanda Vargas Dulché, writer, mother of French origin
- Marcelo Ebrard, politician
- Roberto Heinze Flamand, sprint canoeist, of French descent
- Eugène Goupil, French-born Mexican philanthropist and collector
- Francisco Romano Guillemin, artist, of French descent
- Ralph Heinze, sprint canoeist, of French descent
- Claude Heller, ambassador, of German and French descent
- Saturnino Herrán, painter
- Claudia Islas, actress
- Lourdes Grobet, photographer
- José de la Borda, French-born Mexican philanthropist
- Gustavo Huet, Mexican-born American athlete, of French descent
- Emilio Azcárraga Jean, businessman, of French descent
- Frédéric-Yves Jeannet, French-born Mexican writer and professor
- Elizabeth Katz, actress and former model, of French descent
- Michelito Lagravere, child bullfighter, to French father
- Lou Lopez Sénéchal, basketball player, French mother and Mexican father
- Alberto Ruz Lhuillier, French-born Mexican archaeologist
- José Yves Limantour, Mexican Secretary of Finance 1893-1911, born in Mexico to French immigrant parents
- Ángel Navarro, French-born leading Spanish settler in New Spain
- Montserrat Olivier, actress, television presenter, and former fashion model
- Yadira Pascault Orozco (half-French, Mexico-born) film/television actress and presenter of Sónicamente music program
- Roberto Palazuelos, actor, mother of French origin
- André-Pierre Gignac, footballer, naturalized Mexican citizen
- Elena Poniatowska, French-born Mexican journalist and author; French and Mexican noble descent
- Antonio Enríquez Savignac, politician
- Laurette Séjourné, Italian-born Mexican archaeologist and ethnologist, of French descent
- Eugenio Toussaint, composer, arranger, and jazz musician
- Eduardo Troconis, race-car driver
- Adrián Woll, 19th-century Mexican general, born and died in France
- José Youshimatz, Mexican-born American, retired track cyclist and road bicycle racer; of French descent
- DJ Trevi, Mexican-American, DJ, producer, composer, and actor; of French descent

== See also ==
- France–Mexico relations
- Mexicans in France
- French diaspora
- White Mexicans
- Panteón Francés
