= Vladimir Kaspé =

Vladimir Kaspé (3 May 1910 – 7 October 1996) was a Chinese-born Mexican architect, teacher, and writer. He had a single brother, Simon Kaspé, who was a year older than him. Kaspé was married to Masha Shapiro.

== Life and career ==
He was born on 3 May 1910 in Harbin, China, to Russian-Jewish parents. He moved to Paris in 1926 and studied at the École des Beaux-Arts from 1929 to 1935. There, his teacher was Georges Gromort. He moved to Mexico in the mid-1940s.

In 1948 the Súper Servicio Lomas Building, which he designed, opened. He designed the Albert Einstein Secondary School (Escuela Albert Einstein) in Mexico City, which was in development from 1944 to 1946, and opened in 1949. It was one of his first commissions. With J. Hanhausen, he designed the Facultad de Economia in the Ciudad Universitaria, Mexico City, which was completed in 1953. He also designed the Liceo Franco Mexicano in Mexico City, which opened in 1950. Jane Turner, the author of the Encyclopedia of Latin American and Caribbean Art, wrote that examples his educational architecture were "notable for their formal austerity". He died in Mexico City on 7 October 1996.

== Legacy ==
The Vladimir Kaspé Cultural Center was designed by Jorge Hernandez de la Garza.
