= Mexicans in France =

Mexicans in France Mexicanos en Francia Mexicains en France
Total population
- 40,000 (2020)

Languages
- Mexican Spanish, French

Religion
- Roman Catholicism and Protestantism

Related ethnic groups
- White Mexicans, Amerindian Mexicans, mestizo Mexicans

Mexicans in France refers to Mexicans and their French-born descendants. Paris is the main point of residence for Mexicans, but there are also considerable numbers in Strasbourg and Marseille.

The House of Mexico in Paris is one of 37 residences in the Cité Internationale Universitaire de Paris (CIUP) and was created by the governments of Mexico and France in 1953 to host young university students from Mexico and other Hispanic American countries.

== History ==
Porfirio Díaz in Europe

After resigning from the presidency of Mexico in 1911, Porfirio Díaz and his family began to pack up to retire into exile in Paris, France. After dismissing their former servants paying in gold coins, the Diaz family went to the train station of Santa Clara, south of the capital. Victoriano Huerta was asked to escort the caravan to Veracruz, where one would take steamboat to La Coruña. On May 26, Porfirio and Carmen Romero Rubio, accompanied by the children of General -except Amada- and sisters Carmen, went toward the port of Veracruz. Along the way on the morning of May 27, just before reaching the city of Orizaba, the train was attacked by bandits, which were repelled by federal forces Huerta, and managed to capture more than half the assailants. Arriving in Veracruz the night of that day, and contrary to what happened in other parts of the country, Díaz was greeted with banquets, dinners, dances and parties in his honor. Finally on the morning of May 31, on board the ship German Ypiranga Porfirio Díaz and his family left the country.

Porfirio Díaz began touring Europe and its main capitals with his wife. In April 1912, he was received in the Zarzuela Palace, Madrid by the King of Spain, Alfonso XIII, who invited him to reside in the Iberian Peninsula and presented him with a sword as a gift. Later he toured San Sebastián and Zaragoza. The Kaiser Wilhelm II of Germany sent him in Zaragoza tickets to witness the maneuvers of his army in Munich, where they arrived on the eve of the First World War. After fixing his residence in Paris, Diaz used to go to Biarritz and St. Jean de Luz, on the French coast during the winter. In early 1913, began a tour of North Africa and their journey took them to meet in Cairo, where he toured The Sphinx and the Pyramid of Cheops. In the latter, Díaz was portrayed in a photograph owned General National Archive. During his return to Europe, he visited Naples and Rome.

In Paris, Díaz began to be aware of the transgressions that had occurred in Mexico, thanks to several of his old friends used to go visit him. In late 1913, Porfirio was visited by his daughters Amada and Luz, who remained with their father a few months and together toured Switzerland and the Alps. During the last months of 1914 and early 1915, his health began to seriously deteriorate and later, in June 1915, her doctor ordered him to rest in his bed, so he had to leave their daily morning walks in the forest of Bologna. According to the stories of Carmen Romero Rubio, her husband suffered from hallucinations. On July 2, finally the word had lost track of time and his doctor was called at noon and six p.m. and thirty-two minutes (French time), José de la Cruz Porfirio Díaz Mori died at the age of eighty-four years. He was buried in the church of Saint Honoré l'Eylau, and December 27, 1921, his remains were moved to the Montparnasse Cemetery in Paris. When Carmen Romero Rubio returned to the country in 1931, she left Díaz's remains in France. Since the year of 1989, Mexico has expressed intentions to return to Mexico the remains of Díaz, without achieving results.

== Statistics ==
Year of census	Mexican residents
2005	4,601
2010	1,392 ▼
2011	12,982 ▲
2015	19,003 ▲
2023	40,000 ▲

== See also ==
- French immigration to Mexico
- France-Mexico relations
- Immigration to France
- Second Mexican Empire
