= Ocotepec, Cuernavaca =

Town in Morelos, Mexico

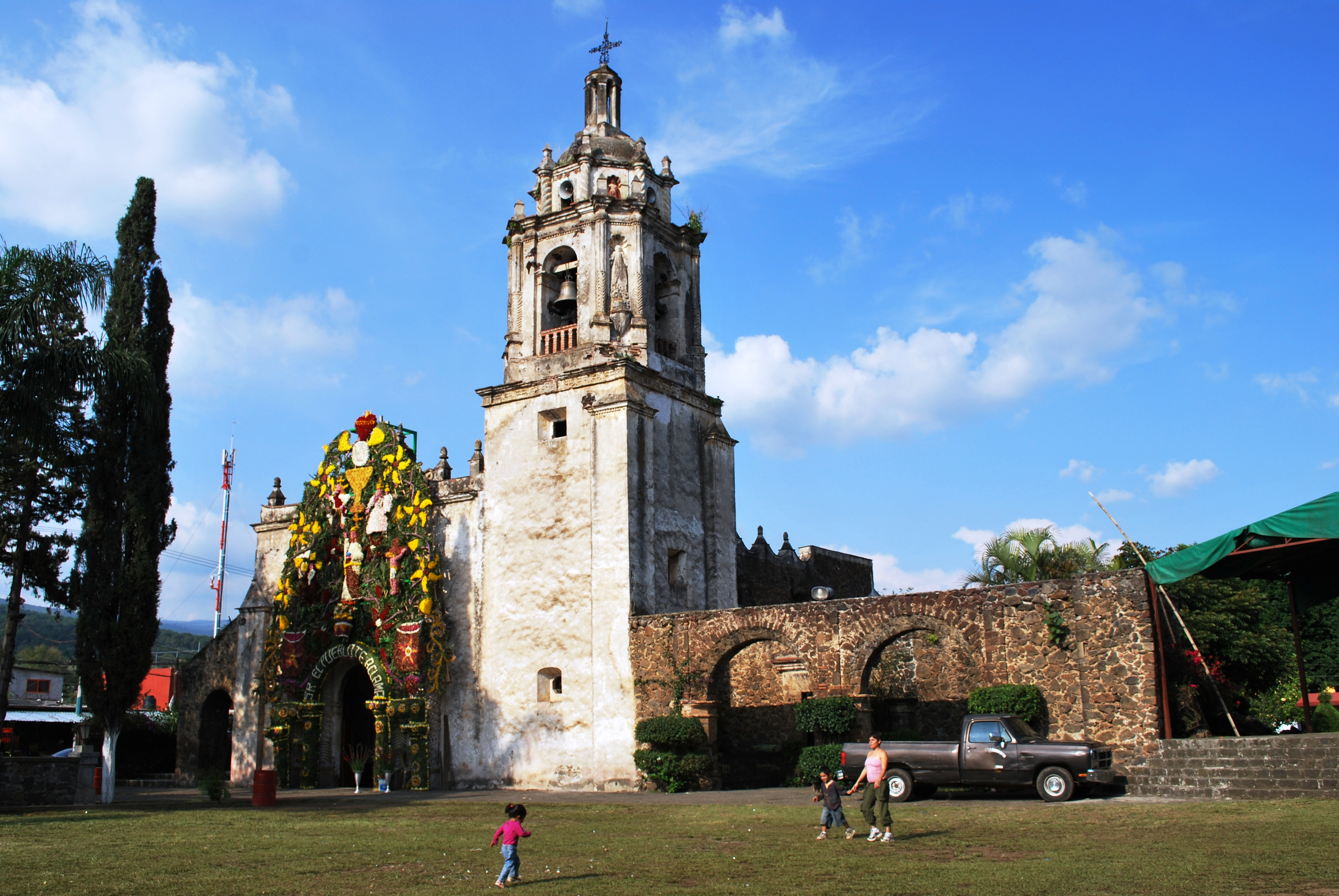
Atrium view of Church of the Divino Salvador

Ocotepec is a small town to the north of the city of Cuernavaca, but within the municipality of Cuernavaca, Mexico. The name Ocotepec means “on the hill of the ocotes, or Montezuma pines.” It is located only minutes from the center of Cuernavaca on the highway that leads to Tepoztlán. The community is divided into four neighborhoods based on the major churches in town, which is an organization left over from the colonial period. The four neighborhoods are Candelaria, Dolores, Ramos, and Santa Cruz, each with its own patron saint and feast day. This organization is part of the reason why this community has managed to maintain more ancient traditions, a number of which date from the pre-Hispanic period. Ocotepec is one of the most traditional communities in the municipality of Cuernavaca. On the main road through town, there are dozens of stores specializing in handcrafted clay, stone and wood pieces, as well as rustic furniture. Among these shops are restaurants and food stalls specializing in barbacoa and cecina.

== History ==
Ocotepec was established in the 15th century as part of the Aztec Empire. Ocotepec was separate from Cuauhnáhuac, but it became part of the Marquessate of the Valley of Oaxaca of Hernán Cortés in 1529. Construction of the convent of the Divino Salvador was begun in 1536 and finished in 1592.

Today Ocotepec is one of 48 localities of Cuernavaca. On May 22, 2020, during the COVID-19 pandemic in Mexico, eleven confirmed cases of the virus were reported in Ocotepec.

== Neighborhoods ==
There are four barrios (neighborhoods) in Ocotepec, each with its own festival:

- Candelaria (Tlaneui), founded by Tlahuicas; Virgin of Candelaria honored on February 2.
- Dolores (Culhuakan), founded by Acolhuas; Our Lady of Sorrows honored on September 15.
- Ramos (Tlakopan), founded by Tecpanecas.
- Santa Cruz (Xalxokotepeazola) founded 1970.

== Church of the Divino Salvador ==
The main church of the town is the Church of the Divino Salvador (Divine Savior). This church was begun in 1532 and finished in 1592. It has a single nave, a barrel vault roof, buttresses on the sides, battlements and a bell tower on the south side. The facade of the church is of Baroque style and sculpted out of lime mortar. To the side there are arches of the cloister for the monastery, but this was never finished. The complex faces a large atrium that is surrounded by a wall, which has battlements and a cornerstone with the date of the church’s consecration.

A plaque on the wall of the church states that during the Siege of Cuernavaca (1914) of the Mexican Revolution, the bells of the church were melted down to make ammunition for the Zapatistas.

The bell tower was severely damaged during the September 19, 2017 Puebla earthquake.

== Town cemetery ==
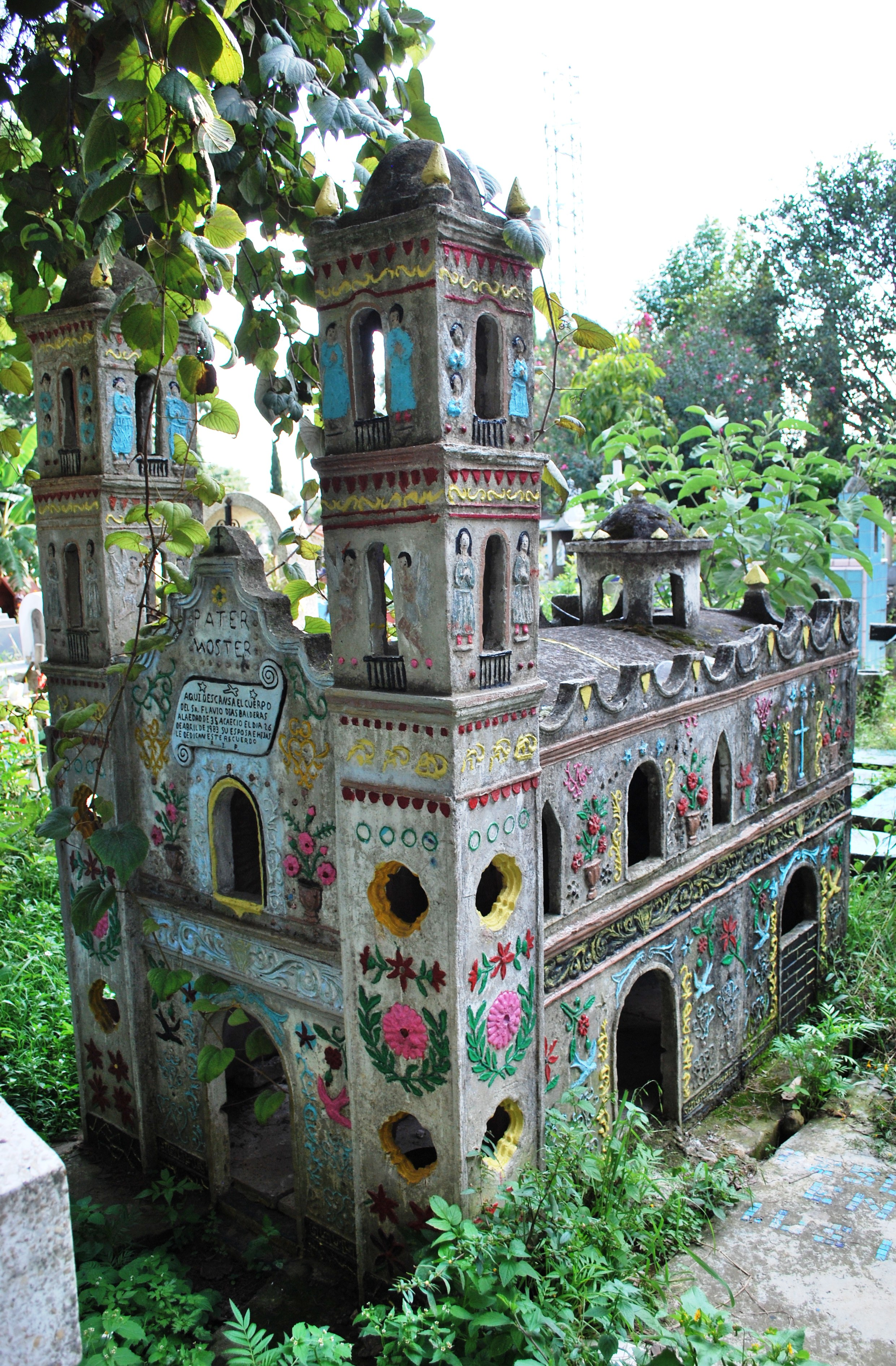
One of the brightly painted tombs at the cemetery

The other, and perhaps more important, cultural attraction here is the town’s cemetery. It is filled with very traditional examples of tomb construction in modern Mexico. Most of the tombs here are covered over with small-scale churches, cathedrals and houses, which are brightly painted and/or tiled. Here preparations for one of the biggest days of the year are made, Dia de los Muertos.

== Dia de los Muertos ==
Día de los Muertos, or Day of the Dead, is a particularly important event in this town. Most of the traditions here are similar to those in the rest of Mexico with masses, altars to the deceased and visits to the cemetery, but Ocotepec has some unique observances as well. Commemoration of the dead actually begins on the feast day of Saint Luke on October 18. Much of the time between the 18th and the 31st is taken up with a novena in honor of the deceased. The most notable difference is the “ofrenda nueva” or literally new offering. Altars are especially created to honor those who have died in the past year. These tend to be the most elaborate, decorated with food and drink the deceased enjoyed in life as well as sugar skulls, numerous flowers, such as Mexican marigolds and candles. In the case of children, toys and sweets are laid on the altar. On many altars here, representations of the four elements, earth, water, fire and air are represented by bread, water, candles and crepe paper respectively. There also can be four candles in the form of a cross oriented to the four cardinal directions. This serves to bless the path that deceased is supposed to take as they rejoin the living on this day. The centerpiece of an ofrenda nueva altar is an effigy of the newly deceased made from fruit, bread and or vegetables, dressed in new clothing and shoes bought for the occasion.

Those houses which have a “new offering” that year can be identified by a path of marigold petals that extend from the altar to the sidewalk outside the house. This serves not only as a signal for the recently deceased, as to find his or her way, but it also is an invitation to the living to come into the home and admire the nueva ofrenda altar. Such visitors are greeted with bread, “ponche” (a hot spiced fruit drink), coffee and tamales. In return visitor light candles and/or leave flowers on the altar.

Another tradition that is particular to this town is a procession that happens on the nights of October 31 and November 1. The whole village files into the cemetery on both nights, carrying offerings and food to eat while seated alongside the tombs. Church bells ring on the night of October 31 to announce the arriving Day of Deceased Children, November 1. On this morning, the graveyard is visited and decorated with multicolored flowers and a Mass is said in honor of those children who have passed on. Later that night, church bells ring again to announce Day of the Dead, November 2, when visits are again made and another Mass is said, this time for adults.

== Education ==
Schools in Ocotepec include:

- Escuela Primaria Yankuik Tlanesi (public Indigenous preschool)
- Colegio Torre Giner (private day care center & preschool)
- Instituto Educativo Aristos (private preschool) Colonia Ampliación Tepepan
- Jose Ma. Morelos (public elementary school)
- Raymundo R. Treviño Alvarado (public elementary school)
- Colegio Cencalli (private, grades K-6), Col Ampliacion Maravillas.
- Rhema (private elementary school)
- Universidad Nahuatl De Ocotepec (Calmecac cultural center for the study of Nahuatl)
- Grupo Educativo Tzitzitlini (day care center)
- Pablo Torres Burgos (public middle school)
- Colegio Paloma (private preschool & elementary school)
- Liceo Agazzi Bombelli (private preschool, elementary, & middle school)
- Lycée Franco-Mexicain (Liceo Franco Mexicano) - Escuela Molière/École Molière

== See also ==
- Cuernavaca Municipality
- List of people from Morelos

== Bibliography ==
- Borboa, Martín. Ocotepec, día de muertos, México City: 2007.
- Díaz, Domingo. Tradiciones y memorias de Ocotepec contadas por Don Domingo Díaz, México City, No date.
- Mentz de Boege, Brígida. Ocotepec, su memoria y sus costumbres relatado por don Pedro Rosales, Aguilar. México City: 1995.
- Pérez Uruñeula, Jesús. Ocotepec, un cerro de mexicaneidad, Ayuntamiento de Cuernavaca. México City, No date.
