= Embassy of Mexico, Paris =

Embassy of Mexico in France
- Embajada de México en Francia

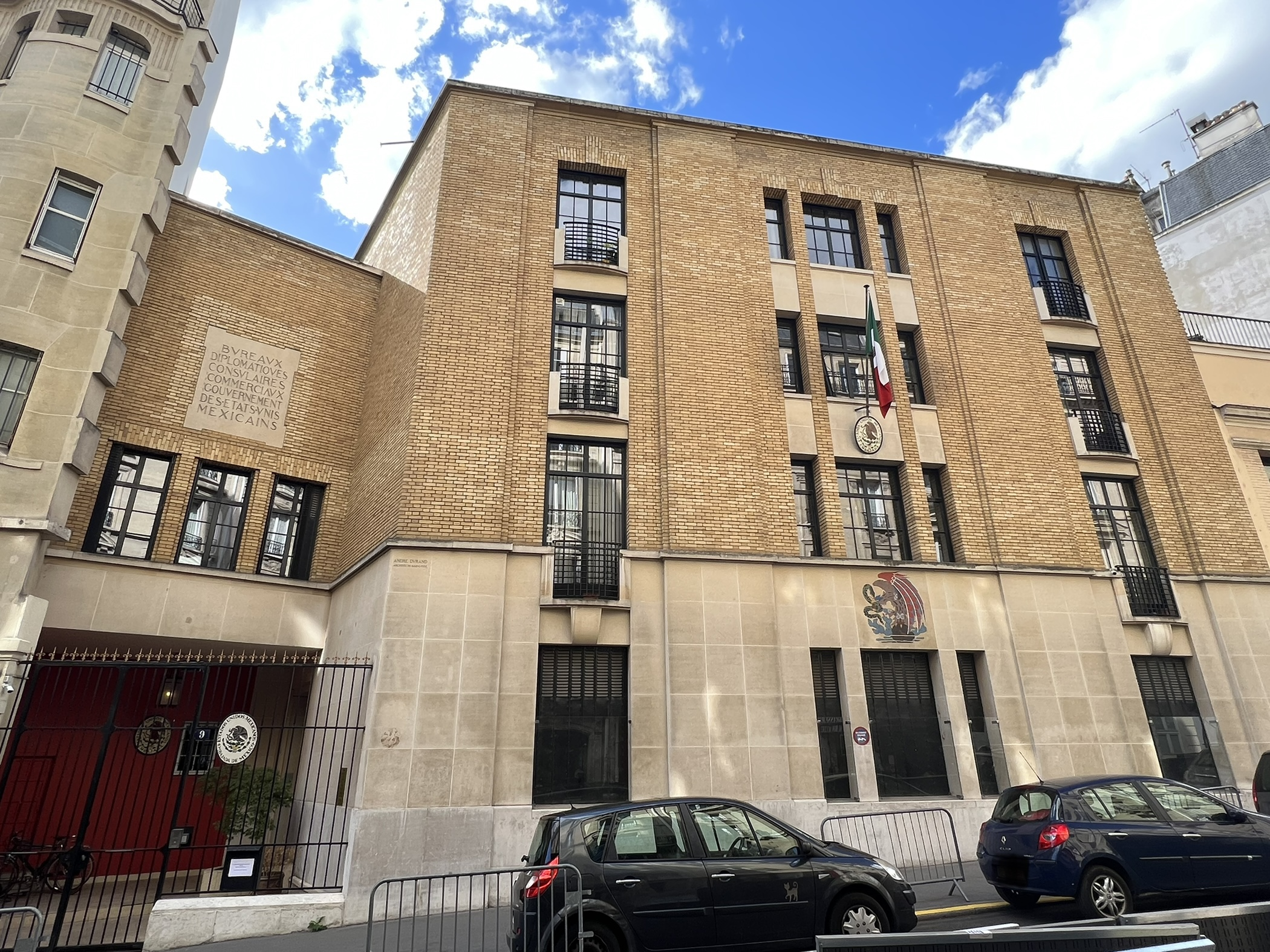
- Incumbent; Blanca Elena Jiménez Cisneros since 31 August 2021
- Style: Excellency
- Type: Diplomatic mission
- Status: Active
- Reports to: Secretariat of Foreign Affairs
- Seat: 9, rue de Longchamp; Paris, France
- Appointer: President of Mexico with Senate advice and consent
- Term length: No set term length
- First holder: Lucas Alamán y Escalada
- Website: embamex.sre.gob.mx/francia

The Embassy of Mexico in France, based out of Paris, is the primary diplomatic mission from the United Mexican States to France. It also represents Mexico to the Principality of Monaco, as well as to the Council of Europe.

== Location ==
The chancery for the embassy is located at 9, rue de Longchamp in Paris. Additionally, the Consular Section is located at 4, rue Nôtre Dame des Victoires. Finally, Mexico also maintains a Cultural Institute at 119, rue Vieille du Temple.

== Ambassadors ==
The Ambassador of Mexico to the France is the highest ranking diplomatic representative of the United Mexican States to the French Republic and subsequently holds the rank of "ambassador extraordinary and plenipotentiary." The following is a list of Mexican ambassadors since the presidency of Vicente Fox Quesada:

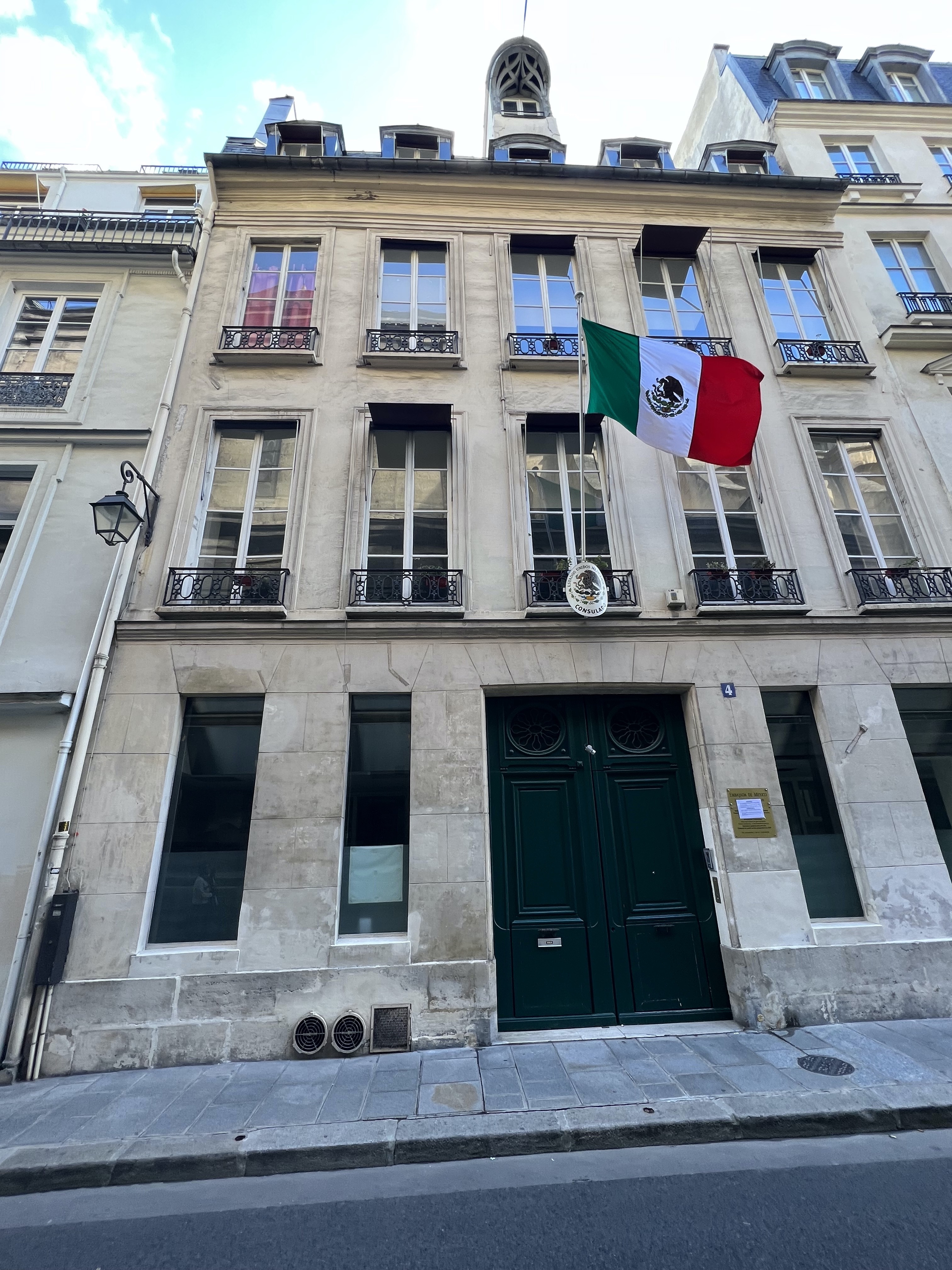
Consulate-General of Mexico in Paris

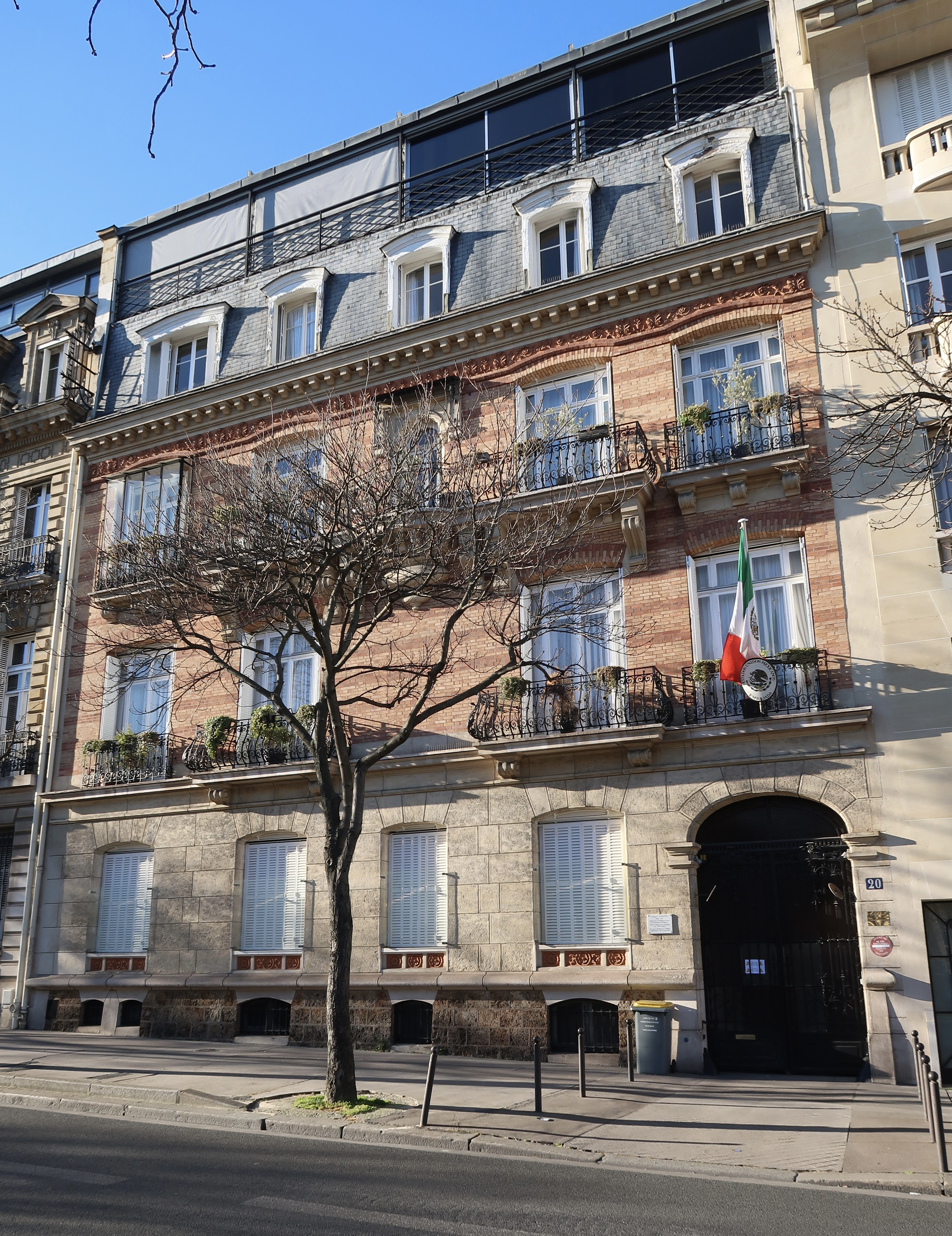
Official residence of the Mexican Ambassador in France, located at 20, avenue du Président-Wilson (on the same compound as the embassy)

- Under President Vicente Fox Quesada (2000 – 2006)
  - 2001 – 2007: Claude Heller Rouassant
- Under President Felipe Calderon (2006 – 2012)
  - 2007: Mabel del Pilar Gómez Oliver
  - 2007 – 2012: Carlos Alberto de Icaza González
- Under President Enrique Peña Nieto (2012 – 2018)
  - 2013 – 2016: Agustín García-López Loaeza
  - 2016 – 2018: Juan Manuel Gómez Robledo
- Under President Andrés Manuel López Obrador (2018 – Present)
  - 2018 – 2021: Juan Manuel Gómez Robledo
  - 2021 – Present: Blanca Elena Jiménez Cisneros

== Embassy sections ==
The embassy exercises a number of functions in its representation to the Government of the France, including political, administrative, economic, public diplomacy, and consular affairs, that are managed by officials from the Secretariat of Foreign Affairs. The difference sections of the embassy are as follow:

- Office of the Ambassador
- Office of the chief of the chancellery
- Office for political affairs
- Office for scientific, technical and university cooperation
- Office for economic affairs
- Office for press and communication
- Office for cultural affairs
- Office for judicial affairs
- Military attaché
- Naval attaché
- Office for representation before the Council of Europe
- Mexican Cultural Institute

== Honorary consulates ==
In addition to the consular section in Paris, the embassy also maintains honorary consulates throughout France, as well as in Monaco. These honorary consulates serve various functions. They work to:

- Try to maintain a good image of Mexico, and its people, in France by providing clarification on certain matters and issues
- Promote academic and cultural exchanges between local French organizations and Mexico
- Represent Mexico in formal and private events, as well as before French governmental institutions, in which it is important that Mexico have a presence
- Provide assistance and guidance to Mexican entrepreneurs who may be visiting France, as well as request information for these entrepreneurs if required
- Disseminate information about Mexico's current affairs, institutions and foreign policy to the local population
- Maintain contact with Mexican students in their locality, as well as to try to meet their needs and provide support when required
- Collaborate with the embassy and Consular Section in Paris to coordinate official visits from Mexican officials when the Mexican Government requests support for such visitors
- Inform the local population, and foreigners alike, about Mexican affairs that may be causing concern or confusion.

All of the honorary consulates are manages by the embassy in Paris, which acts as their supervisory office.

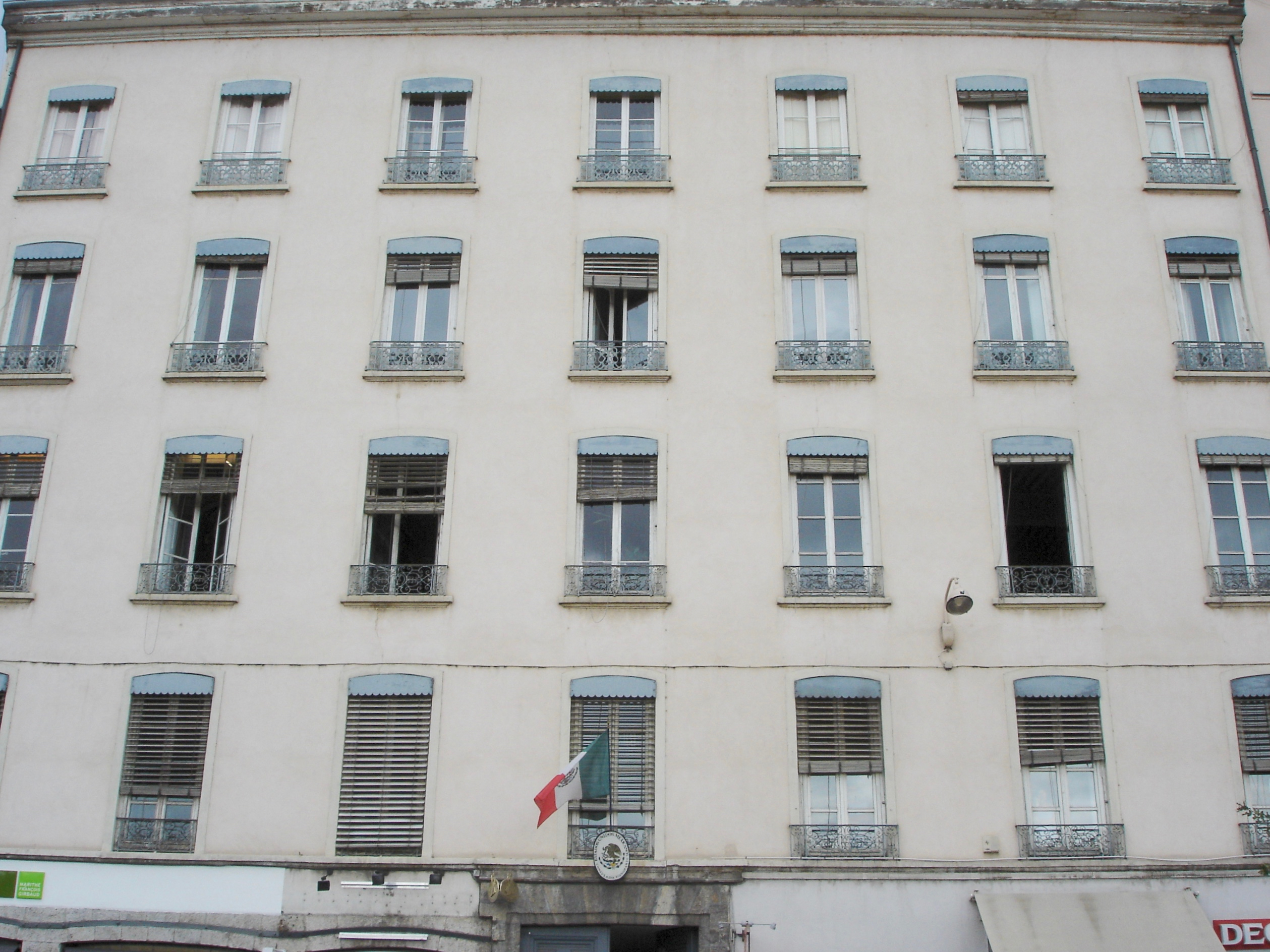
Honorary consulate of Mexico in Lyon

They are located in the following cities:

- Barcelonnette
- Bordeaux
- Dijon
- Le Havre
- Lyon
- Marseille
- Toulouse
- Fort-de-France
- Monte Carlo, Monaco

== Other diplomatic missions in France ==
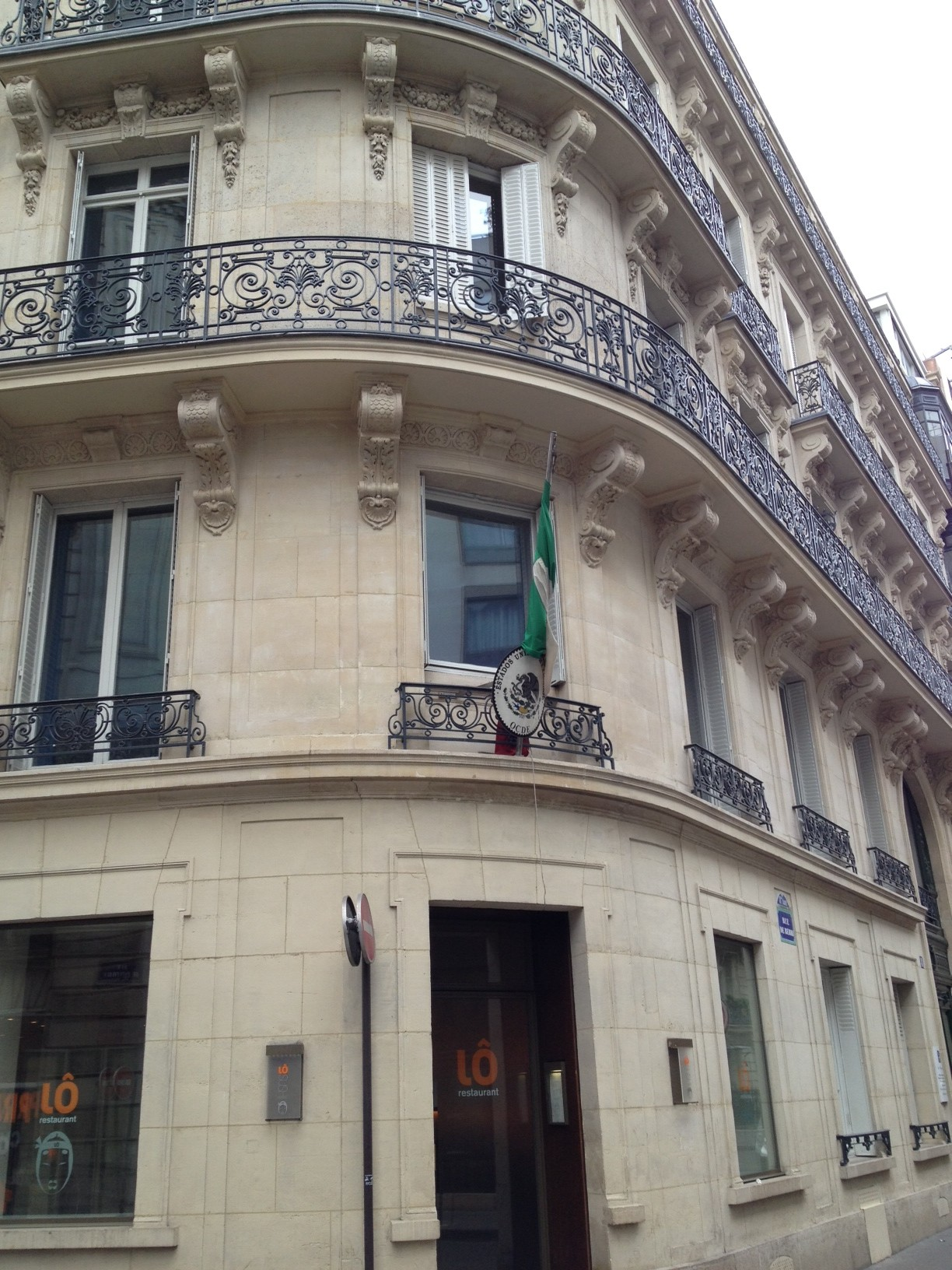
Permanent Mission of Mexico to the OECD in Paris

Separately, Mexico has the following diplomatic missions in France:

- Permanent Mission of Mexico to the Organisation for Economic Co-operation and Development in Paris.
- Permanent Mission of Mexico to UNESCO in Paris.
- Liaison office of Mexico to the Council of Europe in Strasbourg.

== See also ==
- France–Mexico relations
- Foreign relations of Mexico
- List of diplomatic missions of Mexico
