= Jorge Elich =

Spanish lion tamer

Jorge Elich (aged 8 as of January 31, 2008) is a young Spanish lion tamer. He holds the Guinness World Record for being the youngest lion tamer in the world. His most recent documented performance was in the Circus Paris in El Ejido, near Almeria, Spain, in January 2008. Jorge, the youngest of six siblings, took over from his ailing father when he was 5 years old.

== See also ==
- Michelito Lagravere, young Mexican bullfighter.
- Rafita Mirabal, young Mexican bullfighter.
