= Michelito Lagravere =

French Mexican bullfighter (born 1997)

Michel Lagravère Peniche (born December 1, 1997, in Mérida, Yucatán) is a French Mexican bullfighter.

== Biography ==
He has been plying his trade mostly in Mexico and other Latin American countries due to the age restrictions which prevent him from fighting in Spain and also because a child bullfighter in Latin countries can earn around a hundred thousand dollars a year. The minimum age for bullfighters in Spain is 16 years.

Michelito was embroiled in a controversy recently for killing six young bulls in a single fight in the bullring of Mérida, Mexico in a bid to get his name in the Guinness Book of World Records (24 Jan 2009). Animal right activists and child protection groups in the region had objected to such an event but a local judge ruled in its favor after reviewing licenses submitted by Michelito's father. Michelito, who was eleven at the time, killed six calves aged from one to two years old. However, the Guinness World Records said that it was not aware of such an event taking place and as such did not recognize the result. They also made it clear that the organization was against records based on killing or harming of animals.

He has also been banned from performing in many French towns after protests by the Anti-Corrida Alliance, who has been campaigning to ban children from the ring in France. They have actively targeted Michelito, who they think, always seeks to end a fight with a kill unlike other child toreros.

== See also ==
- Rafita Mirabal, young Mexican bullfighter.
- Jorge Elich, young Spanish lion tamer.
