= Rafita Mirabal =

Mexican bullfighter (born 1997)

Rafita Mirabal (born 1997) from the Mexican state of Aguascalientes is believed to be the world's youngest bullfighter. He was discovered in a bullfighting school in his home state and has performed at least 24 fights from 2005 to April 2006 and several more since then. He enters the arena with only a red cape and a short sword to protect himself. His fights differ from those by adult bullfighters. The bulls he fights are smaller (about 400 lb, 180 kg) and he does not kill them, which seems to have an inherent attraction for the audience. Because he is not strong enough to drive a sword into a bull's heart, "he might just wound the animals, and then they (animal rights activists) would repeat the thing about (the sport) being a massacre," according to Jose San Martin, the boy's manager.

== Trampled ==
During a fight in San Miguel de Allende on April 15, 2006 Mirabal was swept into the air and trampled by a vaquilla (horned cow). Older bullfighters distracted the animal to give Mirabal to the time to recover and get back in the fight.

== See also ==
- Michelito Lagravere, young Mexican bullfighter.
- Jorge Elich, young Spanish lion tamer.
