= Francisco Romano Guillemin =

Mexican artist (1883–1950)

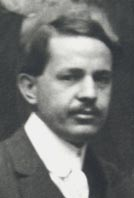

Francisco Romano Guillemín (1883–1950) was a Mexican artist born in Tlapa, Guerrero. He is considered to be one of the few Mexican Impressionists. He started his art studies in Puebla and then continued at the Academia de San Carlos under the direction of Antonio Fabres, German Gedovius and Leandro Izaguirre. He was a fellow student of the famous muralist Diego Rivera. His great influence was Impressionism which he discovered during a trip to Europe. Seurat and his pointillism style played a major role in his formation as an artist. Upon his return to Mexico he became a professor at the Escuela de Bellas Artes. Francisco Romano Guillemin died in Cuautla, Morelos in 1950.

== Gallery ==
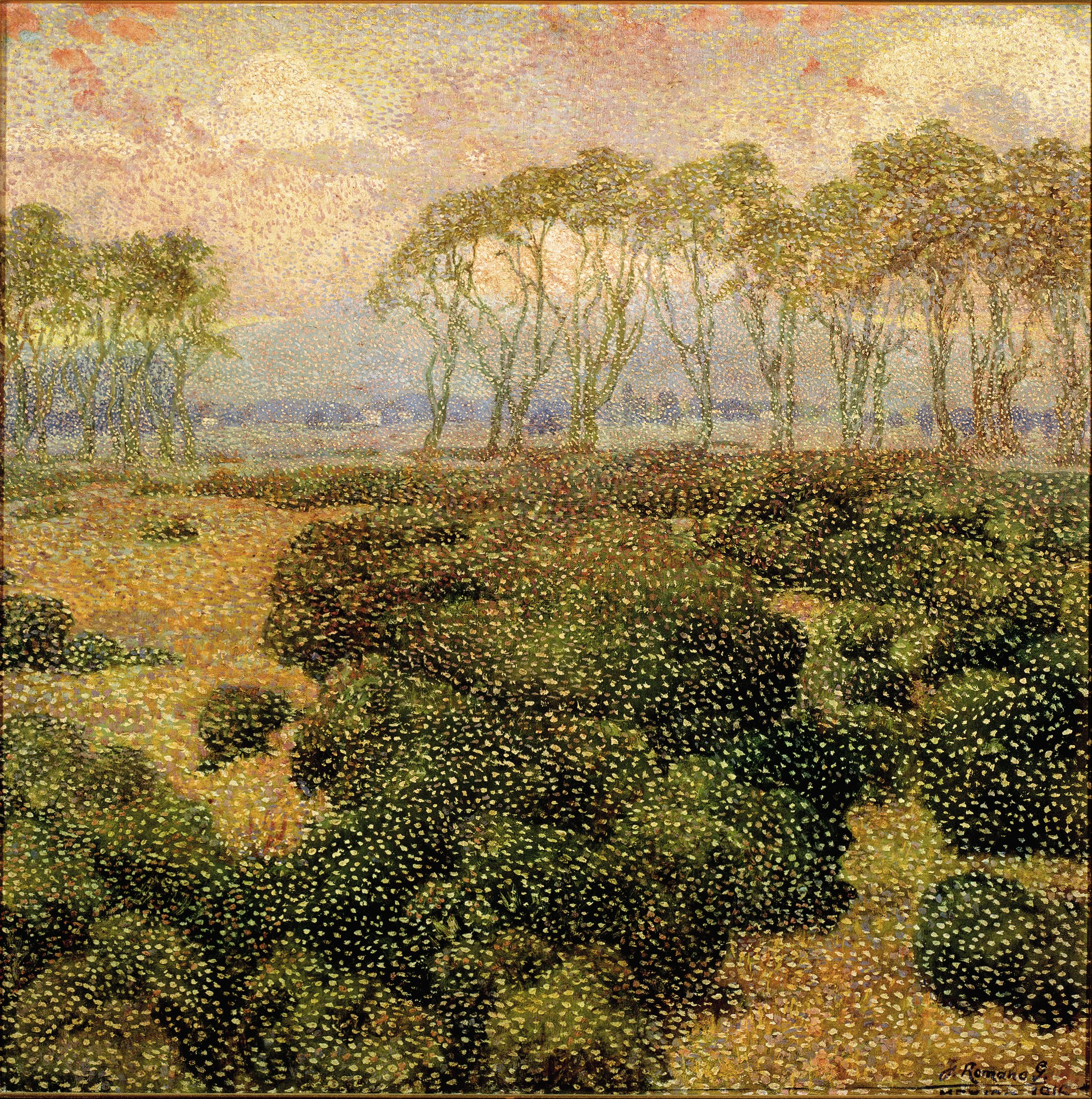
El último beso, 1916

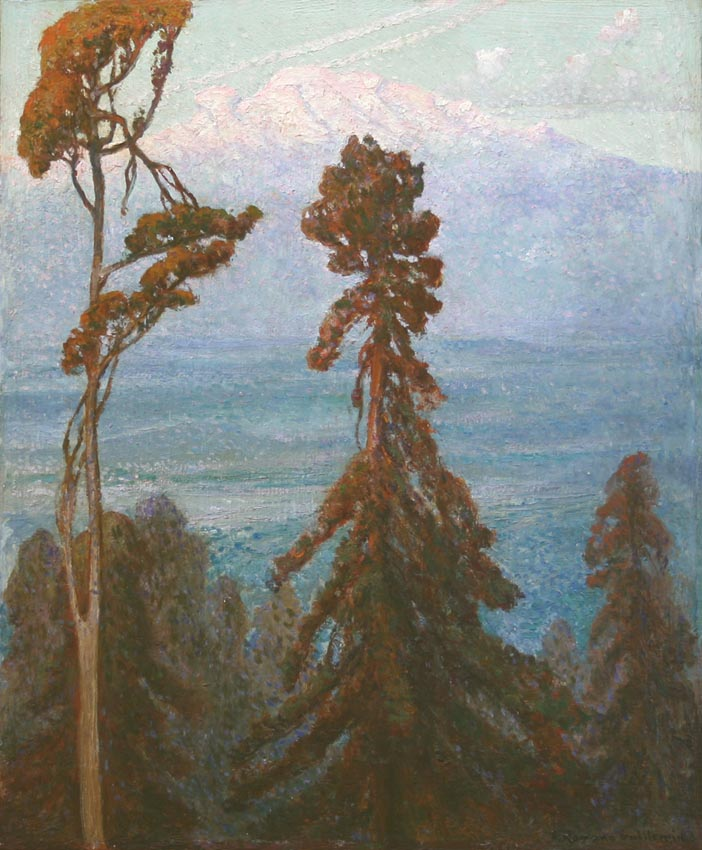
Vista del Iztaccihuatl, c. 1920

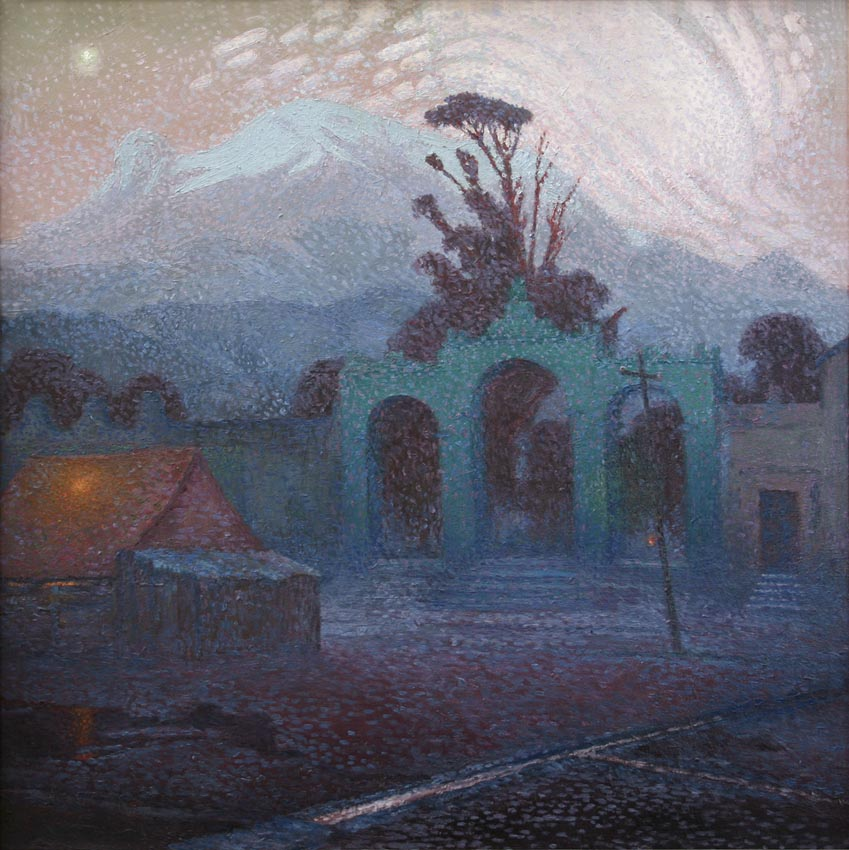
Plaza Amecameca, c. 1921

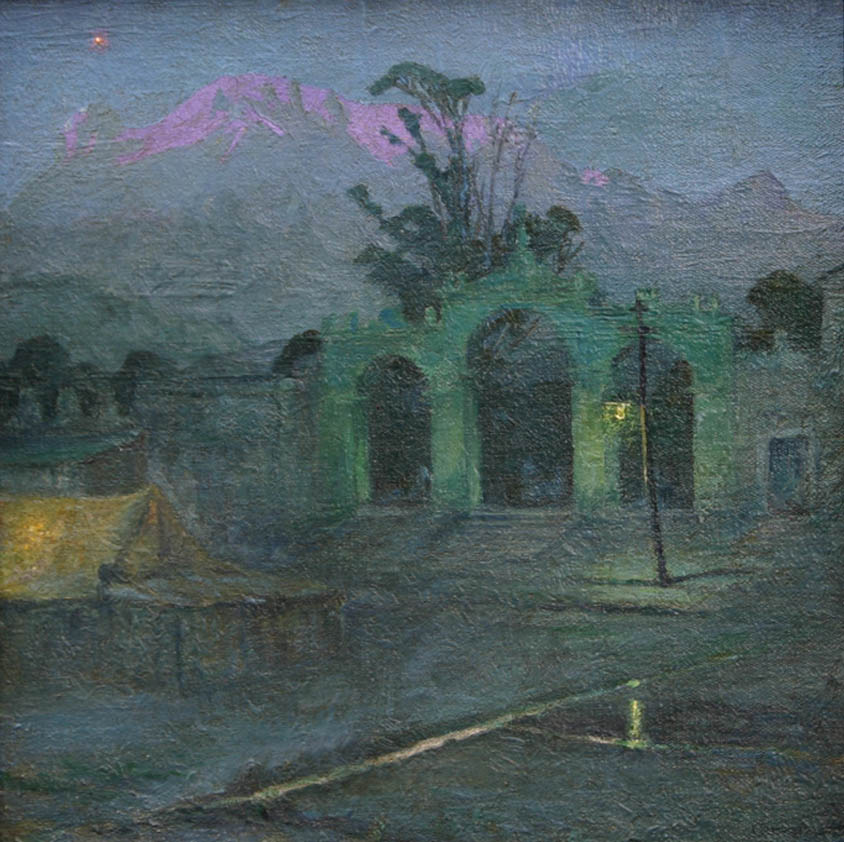
Plaza de Amecameca, 1921
