= Lycée Français de Guadalajara =

Lycée français de Guadalajara
- Colegio Franco Méxicano

Location
- Francisco Villa 235. Colonia El Bajío. CP 45019. Zapopan, Jalisco. México; Zapopan; Mexico
- Coordinates: 20.7052731°N 103.31350700000002°W

Information
- Type: K-12 school
- Grades: K-12
- Website: cfm.edu.mx

Lycée français de Guadalajara (Spanish: Colegio Franco Méxicano, A.C., CFM) is a French international school in Zapopan, Jalisco, Mexico, in Greater Guadalajara. The school serves maternelle (preschool) through lycée (senior high school).

== See also ==
- French immigration to Mexico
