= Lycée Franco-Mexicain =

Private French school with two campuses in Mexico City and one in Morelos

Lycée Franco-Mexicain / Liceo Franco Mexicano
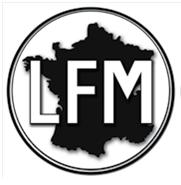

Location
- Polanco Campus: Homero 1521, Col. Polanco, Delegación Miguel Hidalgo, México, D.F., C.P. 11560; Coyoacán Campus: Calle Xico 24, Col. Oxtopulco Universidad, Delegación Coyoacán, México, D.F. C.P. 04310; Cuernavaca Campus: Francisco I. Madero 315, Ocotepec, Cuernavaca, Morelos, C.P. 62220; Mexico City and Cuernavaca; Mexico
- Coordinates: 19°26′14.7″N 99°12′21.5″W 19°20′36.9″N 99°10′48.7″W 18°57′57.3″N 99°13′13.9″W

Information
- Type: Primary and secondary education
- Grades: K-12
- Website: lfm.edu.mx

Campuses in Mexico City
Campus in Morelos
Campuses in Mexico

The Liceo Franco Mexicano A.C. or the Lycée Franco-Mexicain is a private French school with three campuses. It is one of the largest French lycées in the world with over 3,000 students in its two Mexico City campuses: Polanco in Miguel Hidalgo in northern Mexico City, and Coyoacán in southern Mexico City.

There is a third campus, École Molière de Cuernavaca (Escuela Molière), in the city of Ocotepec, Cuernavaca, Morelos.

== History ==
The Lycée was established in 1937 so that the extensive French community in Mexico could give a French education and culture to their family and stay linked to their motherland. Since then the school has evolved a lot and the number of students has increased considerably. Nowadays the school receives mostly French-Mexican and Mexican students, but also children of many diplomats from all over the world, the children of all the French expatriate workers and many other students from other European countries.

== Structure ==
Before the equivalent of high school, the school is divided into a "French" and a "bilingual" section. In the first one, all the courses are given in French (except language courses). In the other section, the classes are taught in Spanish, but they include a French language course. By high school, students of the "bilingual" section are proficient in the language and the two sections are mixed together under the French system and all courses are in French.

== Academic performance ==
The academic level of the school is extremely good and it is recognized as one of the best schools in Mexico, especially recognized for its high level of mathematics (on the same level than the Mexican-Japanese Lyceum and the Colegio Alemán Alexander von Humboldt). The results of the Baccalauréat are especially good, with 97% of students having passed the exam. After graduating, the students follow several paths. The majority are admitted into prestigious Mexican universities, however a good amount also follow superior studies in French universities and the so-called "classes prepa". There is also an increasing number of students who decide to study in other countries (US, Switzerland, UK, etc.).

== Architecture ==
The school building was designed by Vladimir Kaspé.

The National Institute of Fine Arts (Instituto Nacional de Bellas Artes, INBA) declared that the original building has artistic value. The Secretariat for Housing and Urban Development of the Government of Mexico City (Secretaría de Desarrollo Urbano y Vivienda del Gobierno del Distrito Federal; SEDUVI) declared that the original building has heritage value.

== Notable alumni ==
Artists, scientists, CEOs, academics and politicians (as former Secretary of Foreign Affairs Jorge Castañeda Gutman and acclaimed German historian Friedrich Katz) all studied at the LFM, among many other distinguished alumni.

- Arielle Dombasle

Angélica Aragón
Jorge Castañeda Gutman
Justo Sierra
Friedrich Katz
Elena Poniatowska
Daniel SanMateo
Nicole Reich de Polignac
Jorge Volpi
Thalía
Juan Manuel Gómez Robledo
Anna Fusoni

== See also ==
- Agence pour l'enseignement français à l'étranger
- Baccalauréat
- French immigration to Mexico
