= Kan Balam (disambiguation) =

Kan Balam can refer to:

- Kan Bahlam I (524–583), ajaw of Palenque
- Kʼinich Kan Bahlam II (635-702), ajaw of Palenque
- Kan Balam, super computer in Latin America
