= William T. Sanders =

American anthropologist

William Timothy Sanders (1926–2008) was an American anthropologist who specialized in the archaeology of Mesoamerica.

== Early life and education ==
Sanders was born into a working-class family in Patchogue, New York. His interest in Mesoamerica was sparked by reading William H. Prescott's History of the Conquest of Mexico. During his high school years, he struck up a friendship with classmate and fellow future anthropologist Harold C. Conklin.

After serving in the United States Navy during World War II, he undertook his undergraduate and postgraduate education at Harvard University under the G.I. Bill, completing his bachelor's degree in 1949, his master's degree in 1953 and a doctorate in 1957. His senior honors thesis, The Urban Revolution in Central Mexico, applied the cultural evolution model outlined by V. Gordon Childe in his book What Happened in History to the study of Tenochtitlan. At Harvard, he studied under Alfred Tozzer, Earnest Hooton, who inspired Sanders to apply to Harvard after he read Hooton's books as a teenager, Carleton S. Coon, who stimulated his interest in comparative ethnography, and Gordon Willey, who taught him about the regional settlement survey work he had led in the Viru Valley. Sanders later applied and refined Willey's methods in the course of his own work.

In 1951, Sanders studied at the National School of Anthropology and History in Mexico City under Pedro Armillas, who also sought to apply Childe's thinking to Mesoamerica, and fostered Sanders' interest in landscape archaeology. Other significant intellectual influences included Julian Steward, Karl August Wittfogel and Leslie White.

== Career ==
Sanders completed his doctoral dissertation, Tierra y Agua: a Study of Ecological Factors in the Development and Personality of Mesoamerican Civilizations after taking up a post as an assistant professor at the University of Mississippi in 1956, subsequently moving to Penn State University, where he spent the rest of his academic career, three years later and becoming an associate professor in 1962. He undertook a survey of Teotihuacan from 1960 to 1964, the results of which were published in the 1965 book The Cultural Ecology of the Teotihuacan Valley. He was named a professor in 1966. He subsequently shifted his attention southward to Kaminaljuyu in Guatemala, in part due to evidence of links between that Mayan site and Teotihuacan.

Barbara J. Price and Sanders co-authored Mesoamerica: The Evolution of a Civilization (1968). This work used the ecology of Mesoamerica as a way of understanding its cultural development, and Price and Saunders considered that population growth, competition and cooperation were the most influential ecological processes.

In 1979, The Basin of Mexico: Ecological Processes in the Evolution of a Civilization, a regional analysis synthesising multiple survey results spanning 3000 years which was co-authored by Sanders, was published: due to its bright green cover and influence, it has been nicknamed "The Green Bible". During the 1980s and 1990s he co-directed survey work at the Classic Maya site of Copán in Honduras. In 1985, he was elected to the National Academy of Sciences. Outside of the US, he also served as a visiting professor at the Instituto Nacional de Antropología e Historia, the National Autonomous University of Mexico and the National School of Anthropology and History in Mexico.

Sanders' approach was influenced by cultural evolutionism, and laid particular stress on cultural ecology, emphasising the relationship between people and their surroundings, and seeking similarities in different cultures in their response to specific environmental conditions. As such, he saw the study of settlement patters in a society as key, and bound up the study of ecological and demographic developments.

During his studies at Harvard, he developed the concept of the "central Mexican symbiotic region", referring to the network of symbiotic and mutually beneficial social and economic relationships that existed across a diversity of ecological zones in central Mexico prior to the Spanish conquest of the Aztec Empire. He argued that this area saw earlier and more acute urban development and state formation than other areas of Mexico, which he believed was the result of its physical geography: a semiarid climate which facilitated land clearance, variations in altitude meaning that it contained conditions suitable for growing maize, cotton and agave, and unpredictable levels of rainfall which spurred the development of irrigation and intensive agriculture. This in turn led to high population densities which could support more sophisticated agricultural techniques

== Death ==
Sanders died on July 2, 2008, in State College, Pennsylvania, following a fall.
