= David Camorlinga Tagle =

Mexican sculptor

- Born: January 20, 1983 (age 43); Mexico City
- Education: National Autonomous University of Mexico
- Notable work: Susurro del mar
- Website: Camorlinga sculpture

David Camorlinga Tagle (born January 20, 1983) is a Mexican sculptor, who created the Susurro del mar piece for the 2013 Festival Internacional Cervantino.

== Life ==
Camorlinga was born Mexico City, where he still lives as of 2023. He stated that since he was a child he needed to express his emotions, creating things from Legos, wood and string that were in his dreams. He liked to represent things in nature, drawing lines and combining them to form more complex designs such as stars and geometric figures. He used earth to make molds.

He studied architecture at the National Autonomous University of Mexico, and after graduation, went to work with architect Pedro Ramírez Vázquez for five years drawing. Camorlinga states that Ramírez Vázquez taught him an appreciation of pre-Hispanic Mexico.

Camorlinga has traveled to Italy, France, England, Spain, New York, Chicago, Canada and India, as well as various parts of Mexico to visit art museums and study what he saw.

== Career as a sculptor ==
Camorlinga has since changed careers and moved into sculpture. He has had individual exhibitions at the Museo de Arte de Querétaro (2015),Academy of San Carlos (2014), Hotel Live Aqua (2014), La Llorona Gallery in Chicago (2014), Centro Cultural del México Contenporáneo (2014), Centro Deportivo Israelita (2013), Museo de Arte Moderna de Toluca (2013), Tec de Monterrey, Campus Santa Fe (2013), the National Autonomous University of Mexico (2012) and his work can regularly be seen at the Misrachi Galleries.

For the 2013 edition, the Festival Internacional Cervantino commissioned the sculptor to create the 3.66 meter long work Susurro del mar (Sea whisper), of bronze with silver plating. This work was exhibited at the event in conjunction with an individual exhibition of other pieces at the Alhondiga de Granaditas.

== Artistry ==
Camorlinga creates abstract and figurative works, taking his inspiration from nature, people and what he observes around him. His works are influenced by his training as an architect as well as his experiences abroad. He has also named Mexican sculptor Sebastián an important influence, especially with the use of geometry and movement.

His works generally between 30 and 70 cm in height, with a focus on the use of metals, especially bronze, followed by silver and gold, but he has worked with some other materials.
