= Graciela Salicrup =

Mexican architect, archaeologist, and mathematician

Graciela Salicrup López
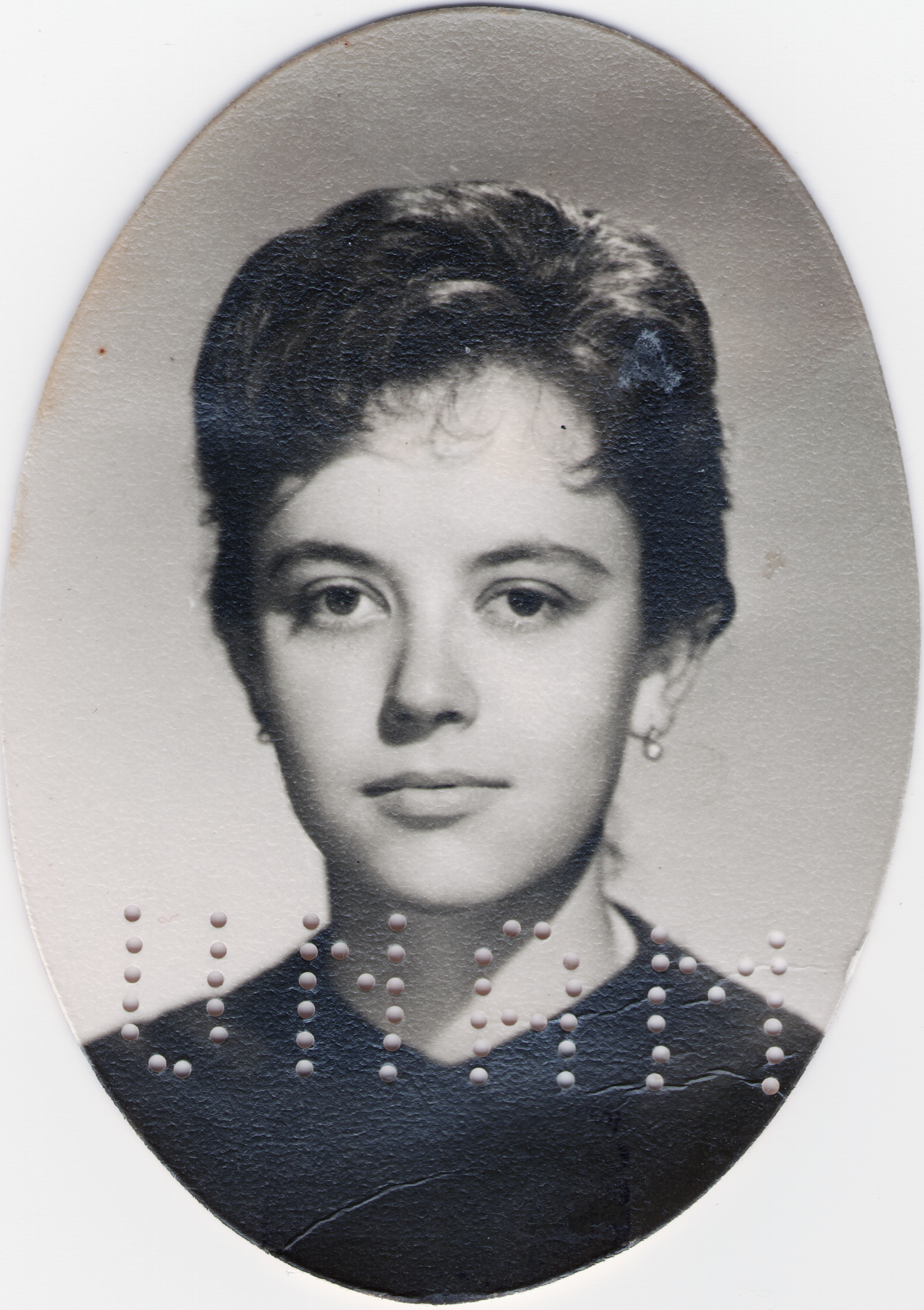
- Born: 7 April 1935; Mexico City, Mexico
- Died: 29 July 1982 (aged 47)
- Education: National Autonomous University of Mexico
- Occupations: Mathematician and architect
- Known for: Pioneer of Categorical Topology

Graciela Beatriz Salicrup López (México City, México, April 7, 1935 – July 29, 1982) was a Mexican architect, archaeologist, and mathematician. In the 1970s and 1980s, she was a pioneer in the field of categorical topology. Most of her work was published in Spanish, and her original contributions were not widely recognized until after her premature death.

== Personal life ==
Graciela Beatriz Salicrup López was born in Mexico City on April 7, 1935. As a child, she attended Colegio Alemán, a German language primary school in Mexico City, followed by a religious secondary school for girls. A professor at Colegio Alemán originally encouraged her, inciting an interest in mathematics that her family did not understand or support, even sending her to see a psychiatrist for "extravagance, disorientation, and a bit of madness," according to her friend Claudia Gomez Wulschner.

When asked how the story ends, Salicrup López states that she married him. She married the psychiatrist Armando Hinojosa Cavazos. They had three children: Ariel who pursued music, David who became an architect like his mother; and Mariana who studied ballet.

Salicrup Lopez had many interests and passions, especially for music and art. She loved the opera and visiting art exhibits. She also enjoyed literature and history.

== Education ==
After completing secondary school, Salicrup Lopez enrolled at the Escuela Nacional Preparatoria where she studied mathematics.

Salicrup López attended the National Autonomous University of Mexico (UNAM) to study architecture and the German language. In 1959, Salicrup López graduated from the National Autonomous University of Mexico (UNAM) with a degree in architecture.

Ten years later, at the age of 34, she earned her master's degree from the National Autonomous University of Mexico (UNAM).

== Career ==
After graduating from the National Autonomous University of Mexico (UNAM) in 1959, Salicrup Lopez worked with the anthropologist Laurette Séjourné on the restoration of Teotihuacan. She worked in the archaeological zone doing surveys and plans as well as directing excavations in important parts of this zone.

Salicrup Lopez still wanted to become a mathematician, and finally enrolled in the Faculty of Sciences in 1964 to study mathematics. Between 1966 and 1968 she taught mathematics at the UNAM Faculty of Architecture. Her thesis, accepted in 1969, was on the Jiang Boju subgroup.

After graduating in 1969 Graciela began teaching in the UNAM Faculty of Sciences. In 1970 she was given a position as a researcher in the UNAM Mathematics Institute, where she worked with Dr. Roberto Vázquez, her mentor. That same year she published her first work along with her mentor.

Her work was concerned with the structure of the Top category of topological spaces and with continuous functions. Her work related concepts such as reflexivity or coreflexivity to those of connection and coexistence, both in Top and in certain subcategories of Top (and in some more general concrete categories). The publications she co-authored with Vázquez were always in Spanish, so many mathematicians were not aware of her work.

During this time, there was a group of important topologists including Horst Herrlich; hence, Salicrup and some fellow mathematicians arranged to take German lessons.

She was elected to the Sociedad Matematica Mexicana with reciprocity to the American Mathematical Society in 1973.

== Legacy ==
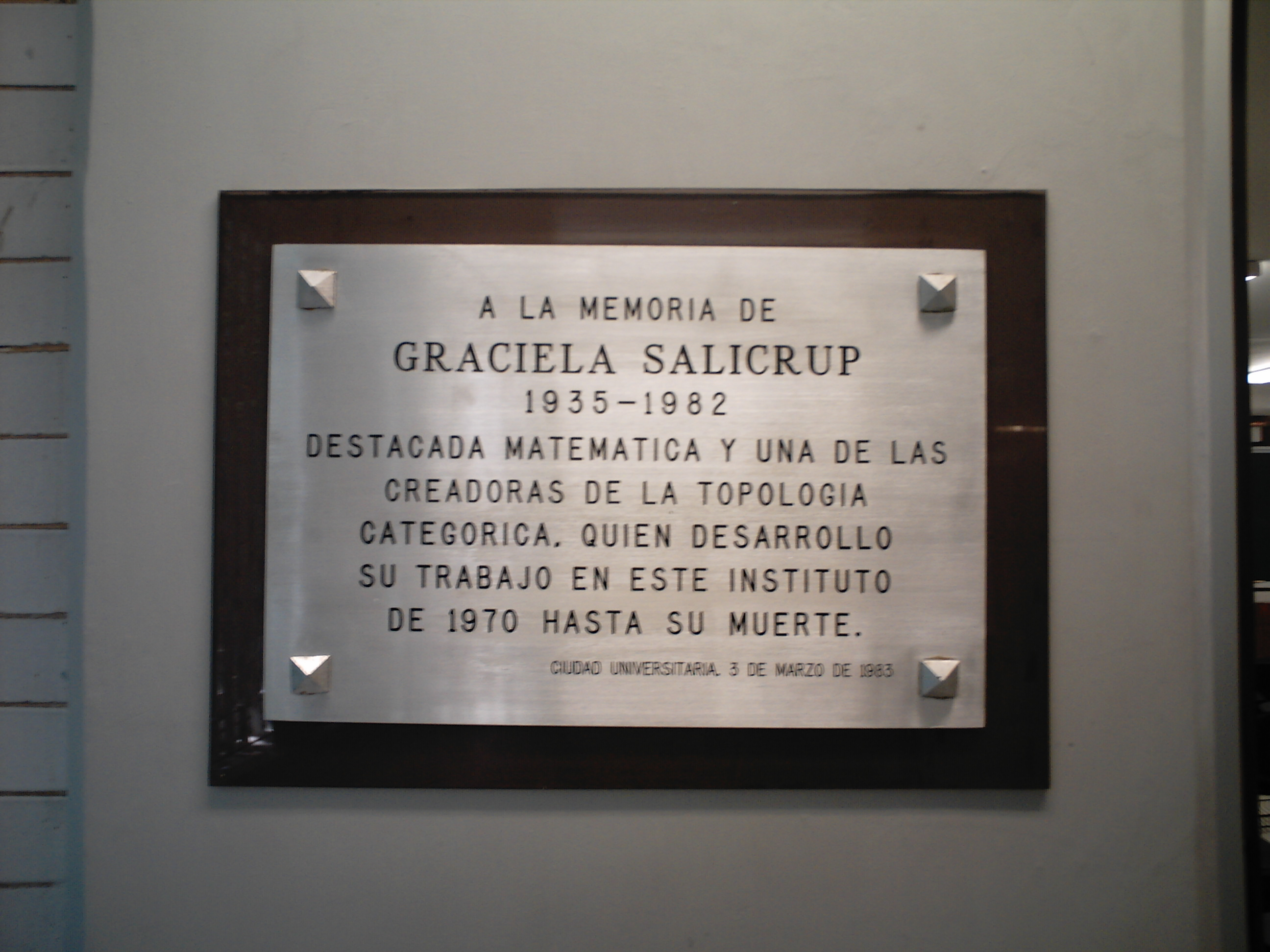
Plaque in the Salón Graciela Salicrup, UNAM Institute of Mathematics

Shortly before her death, Graciela fell out with her mentor Roberto Vázquez and they stopped collaborating. In the summer of 1982, she was visited by Lamar Bentley and Horst Herrlich, with whom she planned to collaborate. Soon after this Graciela suffered a fall that hurt her badly. She did not recover and died on July 29, 1982.

The main hall of the UNAM Institute of Mathematics is named after her. Her research in categorical topology was published in 1986 by Horst Herrlich.

== Selected publications ==
=== Architecture ===
- Laurette Séjourné (May–June 1963), "La cerámica de Teotihuacán", Cuadernos Americanos, graphs of the percentages of different types of ceramics by Graciela
- Laurette Séjourné (September–October 1962), "Interpretación de un jeroglífico teotihuacano", Cuadernos Americanos, drawings by Abel Mendoza and Graciela
- Laurette Sejourné (1966), Arquitectura y pintura en Teotihacán, maps and perspectives by Graciela, México: Siglo XXI Editores

=== Mathematics ===
- Graciela Salicrup (1969), Subgrupo de Jiang-Bo-Ju (thesis), F. de Ciencias, UNAM.
- Graciela Salicrup; Roberto Vázquez (1970), "Fibraciones y correflexiones", Anales del Instituto de Matemáticas, UNAM
- Graciela Salicrup; Roberto Vázquez (1971), "Fibraciones y correflexiones II", Anales del Instituto de Matemáticas, UNAM
- Graciela Salicrup; Roberto Vázquez (1972), "Categor´ias de conexi´on", Anales del Instituto de Matemáticas, UNAM
- Graciela Salicrup; Roberto Vázquez (1973), "T-cocientes", Anales del Instituto de Matemáticas, UNAM
- Graciela Salicrup (1974), "Reflexividad y coconexidad en Top", Anales del Instituto de Matemáticas, UNAM
- Graciela Salicrup; Roberto Vázquez (1975), "Expansiones A-conexas y subespacos A-máximos", Anales del Instituto de Matemáticas, UNAM
- Graciela Salicrup; Roberto Vázquez (1975), "Objetos máximos en categorías de conexión de Top", Anales del Instituto de Matemáticas, UNAM
- Graciela Salicrup; Roberto Vázquez (1977), "On functors with quasi-small fibres", Anales del Instituto de Matemáticas, UNAM
- Graciela Salicrup (1978), "Epirreflexividad y conexidad en categorías concretas topológicas", Anales del Instituto de Matemáticas (doctoral thesis), UNAM
- Graciela Salicrup; Roberto Vázquezz; Horst Herrlich (1979), "Dispersed factorization structures", Canadian Journal of Mathematics (31)
- Graciela Salicrup; Roberto Vázquez; Horst Herrlich (1979), "Light factorization structures", Quaestiones Mathematicae
- Graciela Salicrup; Roberto Vázquez (1979), Connection and disconnection, Lecture Notes in Mathematics, Springer
- Graciela Salicrup (1980), "Normal connection subcategories", Anales del Instituto de Matemáticas, UNAM
- Graciela Salicrup (1981), "Multirreflexividad y multicorreflexividad", Memorias SET
- Graciela Salicrup (1982), "Multiepireflective subcategories", Topology and Its Applications, Elsevier
- Graciela Salicrup (1982), Local monocoreflectivity in topological categories, Lecture Notes in Mathematics, Springer
- Graciela Salicrup; Horst Herrlich; George Strecker (1986), "Factorizations, denseness, separation, and relatively compact objects", Proceedings of the 8th International Conference on Categorical Topology
