= María Leoba Castañeda Rivas =

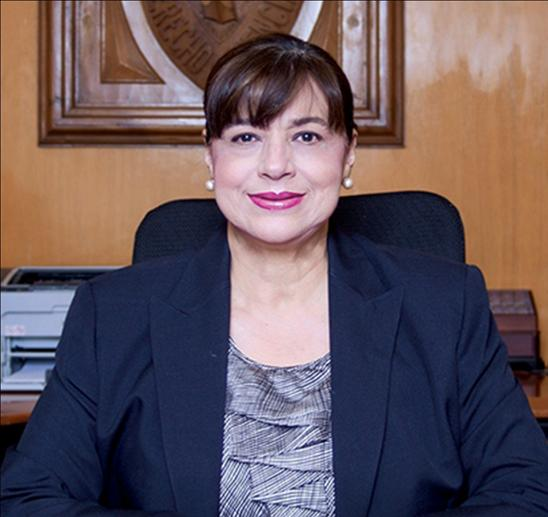
MARÍA LEOBA CASTAÑEDA RIVASBorn: Colima, Mexico Dean of the Faculty of Law of the National Autonomous University of Mexico.

María Leoba Castañeda Rivas, a tenured University Professor in the UNAM Faculty of Law, earned her master's degree studying electoral institutions and procedures of the Federal Electoral Institute (IFE), now the National Electoral Institute (INE), in Mexico. She also studied a specialty at the University of Castilla-La Mancha (Spain). After this, She was awarded an honorary doctorate Degree by the Autonomous University of the State of Morelos (Mexico).

She was director of the Civil Law Seminar at UNAM Faculty of Law. On two occasions, She has been honored by the UNAM with the Felix Pichardo Estrada Outstanding Professor Award; on another two occasions, She was honored with the Rojina Rafael Villegas Outstanding Professor Award.In 2012 Castañeda became the first woman to be appointed Head of the UNAM Faculty of Law.
