= David Herzog =

American physician

David Herzog (born October 18, 1946) is an American expert on eating disorders research and treatment. He was one of the first doctors to advocate that treatments for bulimia, anorexia and other eating disorders include both psychotherapy and medical and nutritional monitoring, as well as careful follow up after patients recover. Today he is a researcher, teacher and advocate. Much of his work has focused on changing the way the fashion industry uses models.

== Education ==
A native of Newark, New Jersey, Herzog graduated from the National Autonomous University of Mexico School of Medicine in 1973. He trained in pediatrics at the University of Wisconsin, Madison, and at Boston City Hospital. He trained in child and adolescent psychiatry at Children's Hospital and Judge Baker Guidance Center in Boston, and in general psychiatry at Massachusetts General Hospital (MGH).

== Early career ==
After Herzog completed his residency in general psychiatry at MGH in 1980, he went on the full-time staff to serve the hospital as Director of the Child Psychiatry Consultation-Liaison Service to Pediatrics, and Director of the Eating Disorders Unit in the Division of Child Psychiatry.

== Eating disorder research, treatment and advocacy ==
Throughout his career, Herzog has spoken out against using underage and underweight models, and supported increased intervention in the fashion industry, including from the government. In May 2012, Herzog was behind the decision of Vogue to stop hiring models suffering from eating disorders or below the age of 16. Herzog headed the largest longitudinal study of eating disorders in the country, in its 25th year in 2012. Herzog has published more than 250 papers, founded or co-founded the Eating Disorders Research Society, the Academy for Eating Disorders, the Eating Disorders Coalition, and the Harvard Eating Disorders Center, now the Harris Center for Education and Advocacy in Eating Disorders at MGH.

Herzog helped organize the annual Harris Center Public Forums, which have been held every spring at Harvard University since 1997. The forum creates dialogue about media, culture and body image, and has attracted speakers like Anna Wintour, Editor of Vogue, Diane von Furstenberg, President of the Council of Fashion Designers of America, and Arianna Huffington, Editor of the Huffington Post. Herzog also organizes speaking opportunities to raise general awareness of eating disorders and the need for more research. Speakers that Herzog has worked with include designer Michael Kors and supermodel Natalia Vodianova.

Herzog is an Endowed Professor in Psychiatry in the Field of Eating Disorders at Harvard Medical School. In 2012 Herzog was accused of misconduct by a former patient who he allegedly had inappropriate sexual conduct with. The Board of Registration in Medicine was quoted as saying "the most serious, immediate, and impactful action allowed by law in order to protect the public and prevent this physician from ever practicing medicine again." Herzog chose to give up his license to practice with the Board accepting his resignation.
