= Omar Guerrero =

Omar Guerrero Orozco
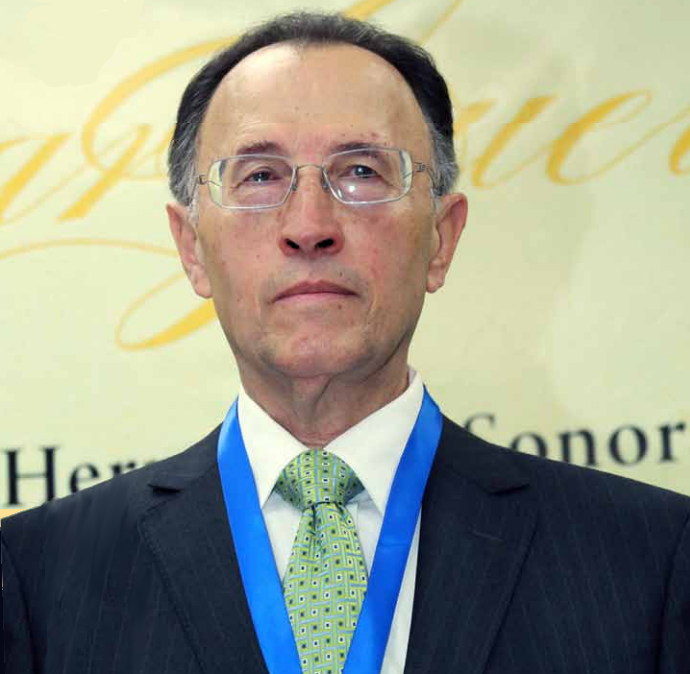
- Born: March 30, 1946; Mexico City, Mexico
- Died: November 12, 2023 (aged 77)
- Occupations: Professor and Mexican national researcher

Academic background
- Education: National Autonomous University of Mexico

Benigno Omar Guerrero Orozco (March 20, 1946 – November 12, 2023) was an academic at the National Autonomous University of Mexico.

Guerrero had a Ph.D. in Public Administration and was a professor at the same institution, and National Researcher Level III, which is the maximum level. He was director of the National Institute of Public Administration (INAP in Spanish) magazine from 1980 to 1982. He was member of the Social Sciences Committee of the National System of Researchers (1999 to 2003), collegial body in which he served as president (2003). He was recipient in 1979 of the “Public Administration Award” granted by the INAP. Guerrero was also member of the Mexican Academy of Sciences since 1987 and of the Mexican Culture Seminar since 2006.

In this same year he was awarded by the National Association of Universities and Higher Education Institutions (ANUIES in Spanish) with the ANUIES Award for his academic contribution to the Higher education 2006. He was granted a Honoris Causa Doctorate by the University of Sonora.

== Publications ==
Published books

- Teoría Administrativa de la Ciencia Política. México, Universidad Nacional Autónoma de México. 1976.
- La Administración Pública del Estado Capitalista. Barcelona, España. 1980.
- El Proceso Histórico de la Acción Gubernamental. México, Instituto Nacional de Administración Pública. 1983.
- Introducción a la Administración Pública. México, Harper and Row Latinoamericana. 1984.
- La Teoría de la Administración Pública. México, Harper and Row Latinoamericana. 1886.
- Las Ciencias de la Administración en el Estado Absolutista. México, Fontamara. 1986.
- El Estado y la Administración Pública en México. México, Instituto Nacional de Administración Pública. 1989.
- La Administración Pública en el Estado de Guerrero. México, Instituto de Administración Pública del Estado de Guerrero. 1991.
- El Estado en la Era de la Modernización. México. Editorial Plaza y Valdés. 1992.
- Historia de la Secretaría de Relaciones Exteriores. Instituto Matías Romero de Estudios Diplomáticos, Secretaría de Relaciones Exteriores. 1993.
- Las Raíces Borbónicas del Estado Mexicano. México, Coordinación de Humanidades de la UNAM. 1995.
- La Formación Profesional de Administradores Públicos en México. Toluca, Instituto de Administración Pública del Estado de México, Universidad Autónoma del Estado de México y Centro Latinoamericano de Administración para el Desarrollo. 1995.
- La Secretaría de Justicia y el Estado de Derecho en México. México, Instituto de Investigaciones Jurídicas, UNAM. 1995.
- Principios de Administración Pública. Santafé de Bogotá, Colombia. Escuela Superior de Administración Pública. 1997.
- El Funcionario, el Diplomático y el Juez: Las Experiencias en la Formación Profesional del Servicio Público en el Mundo. Universidad de Guanajuato, Instituto de Administración Pública de Guanajuato, Instituto Nacional de Administración Pública y Edit. Plaza y Valdés. 1998.
- Del Estado Gerencial al Estado Cívico. México, Universidad Autónoma del Estado de México y Editorial Miguel Ángel Porrúa. 1999.
- Teoría Administrativa del Estado. México, Oxford University Press. 2000.
- Gerencia Pública en la Globalización. México, Miguel Ángel Porrúa y Universidad Autónoma del Estado de México. 2003.
- La Ley del Servicio Profesional de Carrera en la Administración Pública Federal: una Apreciación Administrativa. México, Instituto de Investigaciones Jurídicas, UNAM. 2003.
- La Nueva Gerencia Pública: Neoliberalismo en Administración Pública. México, Edit. Fontamara. 2004.
- Tecnocracia o el Fin de la Política. México, Instituto de Investigaciones Jurídicas, UNAM. 2006.
- El Neoliberalismo: de la Ideología a la Utopía, México, Editorial Fontamara, 2009.
- La Administración Pública a través de las Ciencias Sociales. México, Fondo de Cultura Económica, 2010.
- Historia de la Secretaría de Gobernación. México, Instituto de Investigaciones Jurídicas y Editorial Porrúa Hermanos. 2011.

Classic books edition

- Florentino González, Elementos de Ciencia Administrativa (1840). Bogotá, Escuela Superior de Administración Pública de Colombia. 1994.
- Juan Enrique von Justi, Ciencia del Estado [Versión fiel de los Elementos Generales de Policía, con base en la edición española de 1784]. Institutos de Administración Pública del Estado de México, Institutos Nacionales de Administración Pública de México y de España, y Agencia Española de Cooperación Iberoamericana. 1996.
- Charles-Jean Bonnin, Principios de Administración Pública. México, Fondo de Cultura Económica. 2004.
- Kautilya, Arthasastra de (siglo IV a.c). Toluca, Facultad de Ciencias Políticas y Administración Pública, Universidad Autónoma del Estado de México y Miguel Ángel Porrúa. 2009.
- Varios, Historia del Servicio Civil de Carrera en México. México, Universidad Autónoma del Estado de México, Instituto de Administración Pública del Estado de México y Miguel Ángel Porrúa. 2011.
