= Barbara J. Price =

American cultural anthropologist (1941–2016)

- Born: 1941
- Died: February 18, 2016 (aged 74–75); Manhattan, New York, U.S.
- Education: Swarthmore College; Columbia University
- Known for: Contributions to sociocultural anthropology and archaeology
- Scientific career
- Fields: Anthropology

Barbara J. Price (1941 – February 18, 2016) was an American cultural anthropologist and teacher. She specialised in sociocultural anthropology, while also making theoretical contributions to archaeology. She co-authored the book Mesoamerica: The Evolution of a Civilization (1968) with archeologist William T. Sanders.

== Education ==
Price's father was a master sergeant and she grew up Fort Monmouth and studied at Red Bank High School, where she was valedictorian. She then graduated from Swarthmore College in 1961 with a Bachelor of Arts with high honours in psychology. She was offered both a Woodrow Wilson Fellowship and a National Science Foundation graduate fellowship. She chose to take up the Woodrow Wilson Fellowship and subsequently earned a PhD in anthropology at Columbia University in 1969. At Columbia University, she worked as a research assistant to Margaret Mead and studied under Marvin Harris and Morton Fried, developing interest in materialist theory and sociocultural evolution.

== Career ==
Although Price made significant theoretical contributions to archaeology, she considered herself primarily a sociocultural anthropologist. Her publications included the co-authored book Mesoamerica: The Evolution of a Civilization, which used the ecology of Mesoamerica as a way of understanding its cultural development. Price and Saunders considered that population growth, competition and cooperation were the most influential ecological processes. Price also wrote extensively on Teotihuacan and prehispanic America. She was known for holding informal seminars at American Anthropological Association annual meetings.

In the early 1970s, Price taught without tenure at Temple University, and later became an adjunct professor at Adelphi University, Queen's College, City University of New York, and her alma mater, Columbia University. As a specialist in socio-political evolution, ecological systems, and political economy, she went on to work as a visiting associate professor and eventually a Fulbright Professor at Universidad Nacional Autónoma de México (UNAM).

== Legacy ==
The City University of New York offers the Barbara Price Scholarship to provide financial support for students in their first semester at the Baccalaureate for Unique and Interdisciplinary Studies program.

== Selected works ==
- William T. Sanders & Barbara J. Price, Mesoamerica: The Evolution of a Civilization (Random House, 1968).
