= Guillermo Oliver =

- Born: 1955 (age 70–71); Montevideo, Uruguay
- Education: University of Uruguay, National University of Mexico, and UCLA
- Occupation: Professor
- Employer: Northwestern University

Guillermo Oliver is a Uruguayan-American research scientist. He is currently the Thomas D. Spies Professor of Lymphatic Metabolism at Northwestern University, and director of the Center for Vascular and Developmental Biology at the Feinberg Cardiovascular Research Institute. Oliver is an elected member of both the American Association for the Advancement of Science and the Academia de Ciencias de América Latina.

== Early life and education ==
Guillermo Oliver was born in 1955 in Montevideo, Uruguay. He got his bachelor's degree in Sciences from the University of Uruguay and his Master in Sciences degree from the National University of Mexico (UNAM). He then completed his Ph.D. work, focusing on the role of Hox genes in mouse development at UCLA.

== Career ==
Oliver has worked on cloning and characterizing the Six3 and Prox1 genes. In 1996 he began working in the Department of Genetics at St. Jude Children's Research Hospital in Memphis, as a faculty member. In 2015 he was named the Thomas D. Spies Professor of Lymphatic Metabolism at Northwestern University in the Department of Medicine in the Division of Nephrology and Hypertension, and he is also the director of the Center for Vascular and Developmental Biology at the Feinberg Cardiovascular Research Institute.

== Research ==
One of Oliver's research focuses has been the lymphatic vasculature, and his laboratory demonstrated that Prox1 activity was required for the differentiation of lymphatic endothelial cells and the formation of the entire lymphatic vasculature. They later showed the role of the lymphatic vasculature on obesity. His laboratory also identified Six2 as a critical gene in the process of generation of nephron progenitors and demonstrated that Six3 activity was required for the formation of the mammalian forebrain and neuroretina in mice. He expanded those results using embryonic stem cells and induced pluripotent stem cells to generate eye organoids that mimic early eye development. In 2020, he published his research on the role of the Reelin protein promotes cardiac regeneration and repair by reducing cell death after heart injury in the journal Nature.

== Awards ==
In 2011 Oliver was elected to the American Association for the Advancement of Science in the Section on Biological Sciences. Oliver was then elected a member of the Academia de Ciencias de América Latina in 2019. In 2021 he received the Earl Benditt award from the North American Vascular Biology Organization.
