= Siobhan Guerrero Mc Manus =

Mexican philosopher

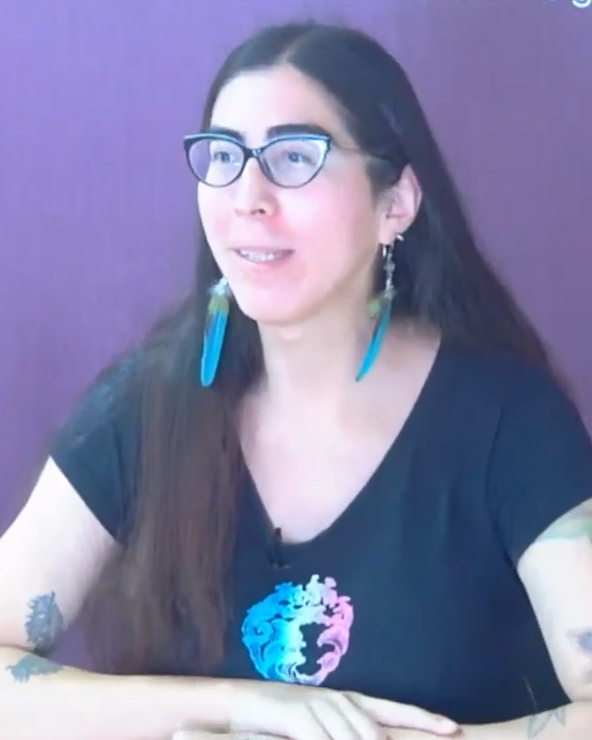
Siobhan Guerrero Mc Manus

Siobhan Fenella Guerrero Mc Manus (birth. 1981) is a Mexican philosopher and humanist known for defending the right to gender identity in minors.

== Academic career ==
She studied a bachelor's degree in Biology at the Faculty of Sciences, her master’s and Ph.D. in Philosophy of Science at the Faculty of Philosophy and Letters and the Institute for Philosophical Research of the National Autonomous University of Mexico, earning both degrees with honors. She is currently a Level II member of the National System of Researchers and works as a full-time tenured Researcher A at the Center for Interdisciplinary Research in Sciences and Humanities. She is also a co-founder of the National Laboratory for Diversities, part of the Honorary Advisory Council of the Metropolitan Autonomous University general Rectorate, a member of the editorial board of the journal Debate Feminista, and part of the General Assembly of the Simone de Beauvoir Leadership Institute.

Her undergraduate thesis topics focused on botany and evolutionary biology, comparing a phylogeny obtained through a maximum parsimony algorithm with another generated by a phenetic algorithm. In her master’s thesis, she continued with evolutionary biology, reflecting on how epistemological access to historical relationships between species and other supra-specific taxa is achieved. This line of analysis continued in her doctoral dissertation, focusing on the categories of homosexuality and exploring the relationship between biological mechanisms, subjectivity, and power.

Her areas of interest include feminism and philosophy, feminist epistemology, science and gender, history of homosexuality, and philosophy of biology.

== Awards and distinctions ==
- 2018 National University Distinction for Young Academics in the area of Humanities Research awarded by UNAM.
- 2020 Research Award in the field of humanities granted by the Mexican Academy of Sciences.

== Publications ==
She has authored 5 books, 11 book chapters, 19 articles in indexed journals, and more than 30 popular science texts.

=== Books ===
- Alba Pons Rabasa and Siobhan F. Guerrero Mc Manus (2018). Affection, Body, and Identity: Embodied Reflections in Feminist Research
- Siobhan F. Guerrero Mc Manus and Lucía Ciccia (2020). Science and Gender: Sex, Brain, and Materialized Experience

=== Articles ===
- Mc Manus, Siobhan (2018); “Biological Explanations and Their Limits: Paleoanthropology Among the Sciences” in Jeffrey Schwartz (ed.), Rethinking Human Evolution. The MIT Press: The Vienna Series of Theoretical Biology, pp. 31-52
- Guerrero Mc Manus, Siobhan and Leah Muñoz Contreras (2018); “Ontopolitics of the Trans Body: Controversy, History, and Identity” in Lucía Raphael De la Madrid and Antonio Gómez Cíntora (editors), Diverse Dialogues for More Possible Worlds. UNAM-IIJ, pp. 71-94.
- Guerrero Mc Manus, Siobhan (2018); ““Let boys be boys and girls be girls”: A Critical Reading of the Concept of “Gender Ideology” from Feminist Epistemology” in María Celeste Bianciotti, María Nohemí González Martínez, and Dhayana Carolina Fernández Matos (compilers), In All Colors. Cartographies of Gender and Sexualities in Latin America. Universidad Simón Bolívar Editions, pp. 35-56.
- Guerrero Mc Manus, Siobhan F. (2017); “Populations of Misre/Cognition” in Perspectives on Science: 712–717.
- Guerrero Mc Manus, Siobhan (2018); “Natures, Cultures, and Disciplinary Architectures: The Infrapolitics of a (Necessarily) Endless Debate” in Metatheoria 8(2): 77–85.
- Guerrero Mc Manus, Siobhan and Leah Muñoz Contreras (2018); “Transfeminist Epistemologies and Gender Identity in Childhood: From Essentialism to the Subject of Knowledge” in Interdisciplinary Journal of Gender Studies of El Colegio de México, 4, May 14, 2018, e168.
