= Kan Balam =

Kan Balam (Spanish pronunciation:kan' balaːm, Tzotzil Maya pronunciation: 'kʱaŋ βalɒm) is a computer cluster located in Mexico City, on the main campus of the UNAM. With a rated capacity of 7.1 teraFLOPS, 3.02 TB of RAM and 160 TB of storage. It started working on January 16, 2007, and was ranked as the number one in Latin America until June 2008. The current best supercomputer in Latin America is run by Brazil.

Among the objectives of this super computer is to allow Mexican researchers to work with highly modern infrastructure without the necessity of leaving the country, thus helping to stop the brain drain that the country has had in the last years.

The principal subjects aided by this computer are astrophysics, particle physics, quantum physics, geology and is mainly devoted towards seismic engineering. It will also be used for weather measurements and it will be available for public and private companies.

== Characteristics ==
=== Processing ===
The computer has 1368 AMD Opteron 2.6 GHz processors and 3016 GB RAM, distributed in 337 calculation nodes, each with 8 GB RAM and two DUO processors and in five specialized nodes with 64 GB RAM each.

=== Storage ===
KanBalam has a storage system of 768 hard disks, with 200 GB each.

=== Interconnection ===
The processing nodes communicate with the storage system in a high-speed network. It connects 576 ports with 2 switches infiniband, reaching a speed of the order of 10 Gbyte/s.

=== Control ===
The computer has 4 HP service nodes.

=== OS ===
Kan Balam runs in the Red Hat Enterprise Linux Operative System.

== Issues ==
At the very beginning the computer was unable to run at optimal speed or make use of the full power of the processors, a problem which DGSCA was already well aware of (it was inaugurated before its final installation was completed). Technically a whole 1/3 of the nodes were unable to run due to temperature issues in the work room (when running all nodes at 100% their capacity). In recent dates, the computer's performance has been stabilized (with the addition of two more cooling units) and is near optimal condition. This prompted an alarmist reaction among the first users which provoked a local periodical to falsely publish and fabricate a supposed "meltdown" of the nodes in early June 2007.

In 2011, UNAM acquired the Miztli supercomputer, an HP cluster with 5320 Cores, speed of 118 Tflops, 13 Tbytes RAM, 344 HP Proliant servers.
