= Jorge Calles-Escandón =

- Born: 11 November 1951 (age 74); Mexico City, Mexico
- Education: National Autonomous University of Mexico (M.D.); Yale Medical School (Post-doctoral fellowship)
- Occupations: Physician, Researcher

Jorge Calles-Escandon (born 11 November 1951) is a Mexican-American physician and researcher who practices at the MetroHealth Medical Center in Cleveland, Ohio. Calles-Escandon is a prominent endocrinologist, researcher, educator, and speaker.
