= DGSCA =

Mexican university organisation

DGSCA (Dirección General de Servicios de Cómputo Académico), also known as Computo Academico UNAM, is a university organisation of the National Autonomous University of Mexico (UNAM). It was previously known as PUC (Programa Universitario de Cómputo). It is the leading organization within the UNAM for computer technologies systems and held the distinction for being the first institution in Mexico (and perhaps Latin America) to install and operate a Cray Y-MP super computer, in early 1990.

As a dependency of the UNAM it handles most affairs related to Supercomputing, Internet 2, Scientific Visualization and Virtual reality as well as the infrastructure of the UNAM's own M.A.N. It currently houses Latin America's most powerful supercomputer, Kan Balam, and the first Virtual Reality complex in Mexico, Ixtli Observatory.

It also serves as the backbone for Mexico's CUDI network.

== History ==
Since the university's purchase of an IBM 650 back in 1958 (arguably one of the first computers in Mexico) there had been a rising demand for people with very particular computer knowledge...that is how to program computer mainframes. For a time, the UNAM's Applied Mathematics and Systems Research Institute (IIMAS) was directly responsible for handling the university's computers but it soon came to the attention of the researchers that a separate entity for the sole purpose of administrating the computational resources (the hardware) was necessary. They got together with the Rector and developed a program for that purpose.

=== Enter PUC ===
On October 14, 1981, the Rector of the UNAM, Dr. Octavio Rivero Serrano inaugurated the Programa Universitario de Computo (~University Program for Computing) or P.U.C. At its core was a "DGSCA" but only as an administrative overseer to the four newly created subdirectives: Docencia, Academic Administration, Research and Central Administration.

=== Administrative overhaul ===
On the 14 May 1985, DGSCA was formally created out of PUC. Certain demands of the time had overwhelmed the responsibilities PUC and a formalization of its incorporation to the Academic General Secretary was necessary. As a result, only 3 of the former subdirectives were preserved (that is Central Administration was closed).

The last remnants of Central Administration (which had become part of DGSCA) are absorbed into the General Secretary in 1987. DGSCA becomes a subsystem of the Academic General Secretary.

From the people that worked in DGSCA, it is the institute that came to replace Computo Academico UNAM (the former institute in charge of maintaining the UNAM's Supercomputers). DGSCA grew out of a handful of people in IIMAS who were very enthusiastic about PUC and wanted to spearhead advanced computer applications, not only among the student population, but in the curricula as well. Some view its inception as an after-effect of the founding of Computer Engineering in the Faculty of Engineering, in which there was a growing need for experts in the field of supercomputing, but it was just one of many concurrent solutions to the same problem.

Provisionally composed of a few professors and student interns (or becarios), DGSCA soon came to adopt a more professional and independent infrastructure to address commercial clients requiring access to the supercomputer (the forementioned reforms in 1985 and 1987). Under this new presentation, DGSCA administered to the scientific and academic community with the full backing and recognition of the computer industry.

In 1991, along with the purchase of the Cray Y-MP, DGSCA moved its central office from the IIMAS complex to the building formerly housing the Cray X-MP Supercomputer. As the need arose to visualize the data processed by the Y-MP a new visualization department was created from the supercomputing department.

1998 saw the introduction of a new super computer to help complement the operations of the Y-MP (eventually replacing it) in the form of a 6 node SGI Cray Origin 2000. The Cray Y-MP itself was shut down and moved the UNAM's Science Museum (Universum) in 2000.

By 2008, DGSCA has established many branches throughout Mexico City and a few dependencies throughout the Republic, having several main divisions including D.C.I. (Computing for Research Division), D.C.D. (Computing for Academic aide Division), D.T. (Telecommunications Division) and the Systems Division.

== Computing for Research Division ==
The two main strengths of DGSCA have always resided in the administration of the UNAM's supercomputing facilities and its internal network. Of these DCI (Division de Computo para la Investigacion) administrates the Supercomputing area of DGSCA. It further divides itself into the Department of SuperComputing, Visualization, Virtual Reality, the Ixtli V.R. observatory and Computer Security all having been subsequent outbranchings of SuperComputing.

As mentioned before, Visualization was created from SuperComputing in the 90's as the necessity to visualize large volumes of data became necessary; Virtual Reality was created from Visualization to tackle specific problems in making that data interactive and presentable in the Ixtli V.R. observatory.

The Ixtli observatory was formerly administered directly by the V.R. department, but in 2007 certain responsibilities had to be delegated to a separate focus group in order to enhance services. That group, the Ixtli department, now handles the maintenance of the facility as well as its presentation and client reception.

The Computer Security department was established around 1999 by Juan Carlos Guel. It was preceded 4 years prior (95–96) by the Computer Security Area founded by Diego Zamboni. The objective of the department being to collaborate with other computer security centers on developing secure software tools, making it one of the most renowned entities in Computer security both on a national level and in Latin America.

== See also ==
- UNAM—Universidad Nacional Autonoma de Mexico
- Kan Balam—Current Supercomputer in operation within DGSCA
