= National Autonomous University of Mexico =

Public research university in Mexico

- Universidad Nacional Autónoma de México
- Latin: Universitas Mexicana
- Former name: National University of Mexico (1910–1929)
- Motto: Por mi raza hablará el espíritu
- Motto in English: "For my race, shall the spirit speak"
- Type: Public research university
- Established: 22 September 1910
- Founders: Justo Sierra; Porfirio Díaz
- Budget: US$3.1 billion (2025)
- Rector: Leonardo Lomelí Vanegas
- Academic staff: 43,156 (as of 2025)
- Students: 372,755 (2025–2025 academic year)
- Undergraduates: 232,106 (as of 2025)
- Postgraduates: 33,851 (as of 2025)
- Other students: 106,087 (high school) (as of 2023)
- Location: Av. Universidad 3000, Col. Universidad Nacional Autónoma de México, C.P. 04510, Ciudad Universitaria, Coyoacán, Mexico City, Mexico; 19°19′44″N 99°11′14″W
- Campus: Urban, 7.3 km^{2} (2.8 sq mi), main campus only
- Colors: Blue and gold
- Nickname: Pumas
- Sporting affiliations: 41 varsity teams
- Mascot: Goyo
- Website: english.unam.mx

UNESCO World Heritage Site
- Official name: Central University City Campus of the National Autonomous University of Mexico (UNAM)
- Type: Cultural
- Criteria: i, ii, iv
- Designated: 2007 (31st session)
- Reference no.: 1250
- Region: Latin America and the Caribbean

The National Autonomous University of Mexico (Spanish: Universidad Nacional Autónoma de México, UNAM) is a public research university in Mexico. It has several campuses in Mexico City, and many others in various locations across Mexico, as well as a presence in nine countries. It also has 34 research institutes, 26 museums, and 18 historic sites. With more than 324,413 students, UNAM is one of the world's largest universities.

A portion of Ciudad Universitaria (University City), UNAM's main campus in Mexico City, is a UNESCO World Heritage site that was designed and decorated by some of Mexico's best-known architects and painters. The campus hosted the main events of the 1968 Summer Olympics, and was the birthplace of the student movement of 1968. All Mexican Nobel laureates have been alumni of UNAM. In 2009, the university was awarded the Prince of Asturias Award for Communication and Humanities. More than 25% of the total scientific papers published by Mexican academics come from researchers at UNAM.

UNAM was founded in its modern form, on 22 September 1910 by Justo Sierra as a secular alternative to its predecessor, the Royal and Pontifical University of Mexico (the first Western-style university in North America, founded in 1551).

== History ==
The university was founded on 22 September 1910 by Justo Sierra, then minister of education in the Porfiriato, who sought to create a very different institution from its 19th-century precursor, the Royal and Pontifical University of Mexico, which had been founded on 21 September 1551 by a royal decree signed by Crown Prince Phillip II on behalf of Charles I of Spain and brought to a definitive closure in 1865 by Maximilian I of Mexico. Instead of reviving what he saw as an anachronistic institution with strong ties to the Roman Catholic Church, he aimed to merge and expand Mexico City's decentralized colleges of higher education (including former faculties of the old university) and create a new university, secular in nature and national in scope, that could reorganize higher education within the country, serve as a model of positivism and encompass the ideas of the dominant Mexican liberalism.

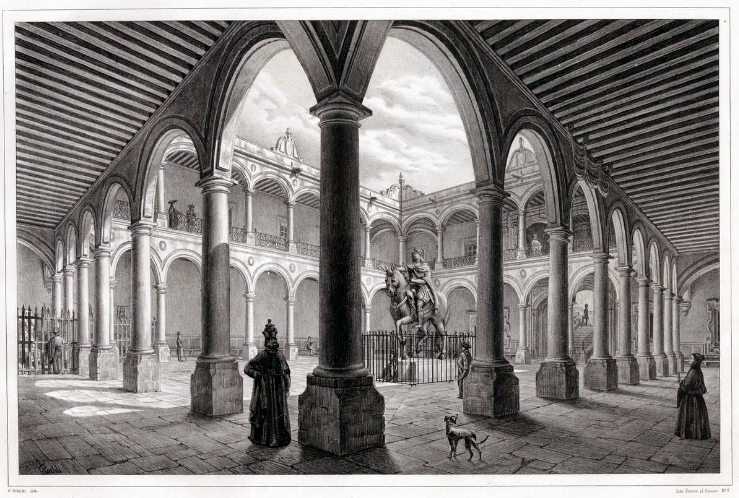
Interior of the Royal and Pontifical University of Mexico, lithograph by Pietro Gualdi, 1840

The project initially unified the Fine Arts, Business, Political Science, Jurisprudence, Engineering, Medicine, Normal, and the National Preparatory schools; its first rector was Joaquin Eguía y Lis.

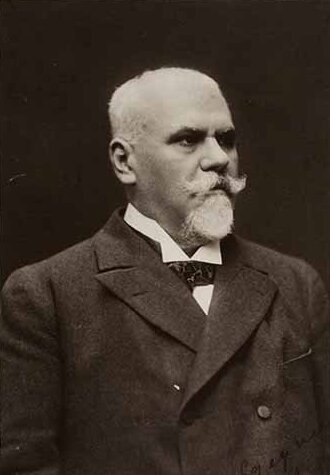
Justo Sierra, founder of the National University of Mexico in its current incarnation.

The new university's challenges were mostly political, due to the ongoing Mexican Revolution and the fact that the federal government had direct control over the university's policies and curriculum; some resisted its establishment on philosophical grounds. This opposition led to disruptions in the function of the university when political instability forced resignations in the government, including that of President Díaz. Internally, the first student strike occurred in 1912 to protest examination methods introduced by the director of the School of Jurisprudence, Luis Cabrera Lobato. By July of that year, a majority of the law students decided to abandon the university and join the newly created Free School of Law.

In 1914 initial efforts to gain autonomy for the university failed. In 1920, José Vasconcelos became rector. In 1921, he created the school's coat-of-arms: the image of an eagle and a condor surrounding a map of Latin America, from Mexico's northern border to Tierra del Fuego, and the motto, "The Spirit shall speak for my people". Efforts to gain autonomy for the university continued in the early 1920s. In the mid-1920s, the second wave of student strikes opposed a new grading system. The strikes included major classroom walkouts in the law school and confrontation with police at the medical school. The striking students were supported by many professors and subsequent negotiations eventually led to autonomy for the university. The institution was no longer a dependency of the Secretariat of Public Education; the university rector became the final authority, eliminating much of the confusing overlap in authority.

During the early 1930s, the rector of UNAM was Manuel Gómez Morín. The government attempted to implement socialist education at Mexican universities, which Gómez Morín, many professors, and Catholics opposed as an infringement on academic freedom. Gómez Morín with the support of the Jesuit-founded student group, the Unión Nacional de Estudiantes Católicos, successfully fought against socialist education. UNAM supported the recognition of the academic certificates by Catholic preparatory schools, which validated their educational function. UNAM played an important role in the founding of the Jesuit institution, the Universidad Iberoamericana, in 1943. However, UNAM opposed initiatives at the Universidad Iberoamericana in later years, opposing the establishment of majors in industrial relations and communications.

In 1943 initial decisions were made to move the university from the various buildings it occupied in the city center to a new and consolidated university campus; the new Ciudad Universitaria (lit. University City) would be in San Ángel, to the south of the city. The first stone laid was that of the faculty of Sciences, the first building of Ciudad Universitaria. President Miguel Alemán Valdés participated in the ceremony on 20 November 1952. The University Olympic Stadium was inaugurated on the same day. In 1957 the Doctorate Council was created to regulate and organize graduate studies.

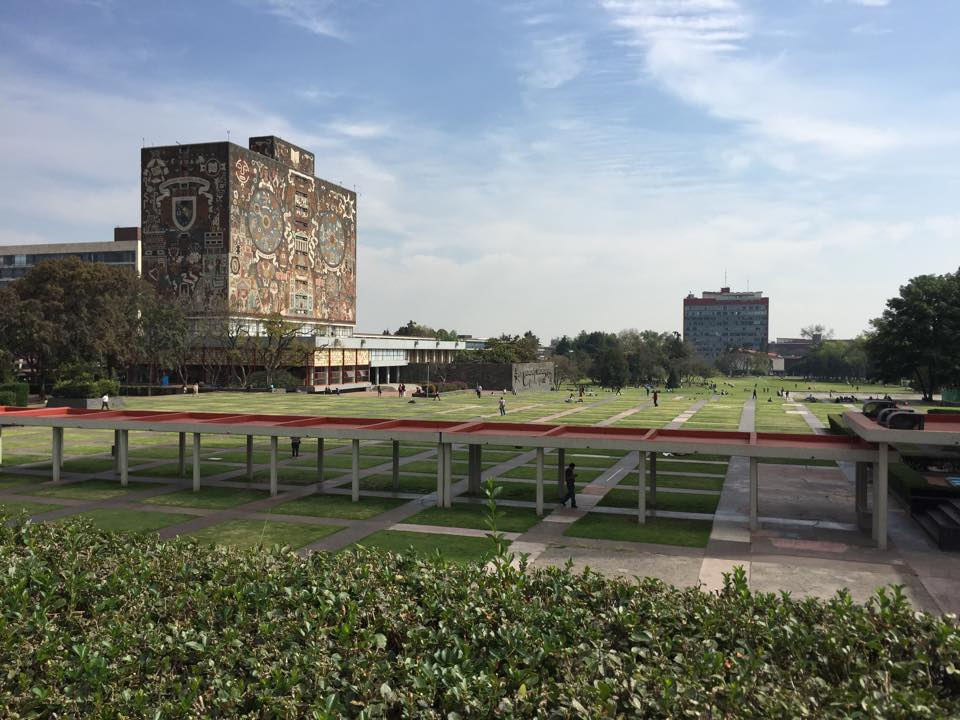
The iconic central library, by Juan O'Gorman.

Another major student strike, again over examination regulations, occurred in 1966. Students invaded the rectorate and forced the rector to resign. The Board of Regents did not accept this resignation, so the professors went on strike, paralyzing the university and forcing the Board's acceptance. In the summer, violent outbreaks occurred on a number of the campuses of the university's affiliated preparatory schools; police took over several high school campuses, with injuries.

Students at UNAM, along with other Mexico City universities, mobilized in what has come to be called Mexico 68, protests against the 1968 Mexico City Olympics, but also a whole array of political and social tensions. During August 1968, protests formed on the main campus against the police actions on the main campus and in the center of the city. The protests grew into a student movement that demanded the resignation of the police chief, among other things. More protests followed in September, gaining frequency and numbers. During a meeting of the student leaders, the army fired on the Chihuahua building in Tlatelolco, where the student organization supposedly was. In the Tlatelolco massacre, the police action resulted in many dead, wounded, and detained. Protests continued on after that. Only ten days later, the 1968 Olympic Games opened at the University Stadium. The university was shut down for the duration.

The 1970s and 1980s saw the opening of satellite campuses in other parts of Mexico and nearby areas, to decentralize the system. There were some minor student strikes, mostly concerning grading and tuition.

The last major student strike at the university occurred in 1999–2000 when students shut down the campus for almost a year to protest a proposal to charge students the equivalent of US$150 per semester for those who could afford it. Referendums were held by both the university and the strikers, but neither side accepted the others' results. Acting on a judge's order, the police stormed the buildings held by strikers on 7 February 2000, putting an end to the strike.

In 2009 the university was awarded the Prince of Asturias Award for Communication and Humanities and began the celebration of its centennial anniversary with several activities that will last until 2011.

The UNAM has actively included minorities into different educational fields, as in technology. In 2016, the university adopted United Nations platforms throughout all of its campuses to support and empower women.

== Campuses ==
=== University City ===
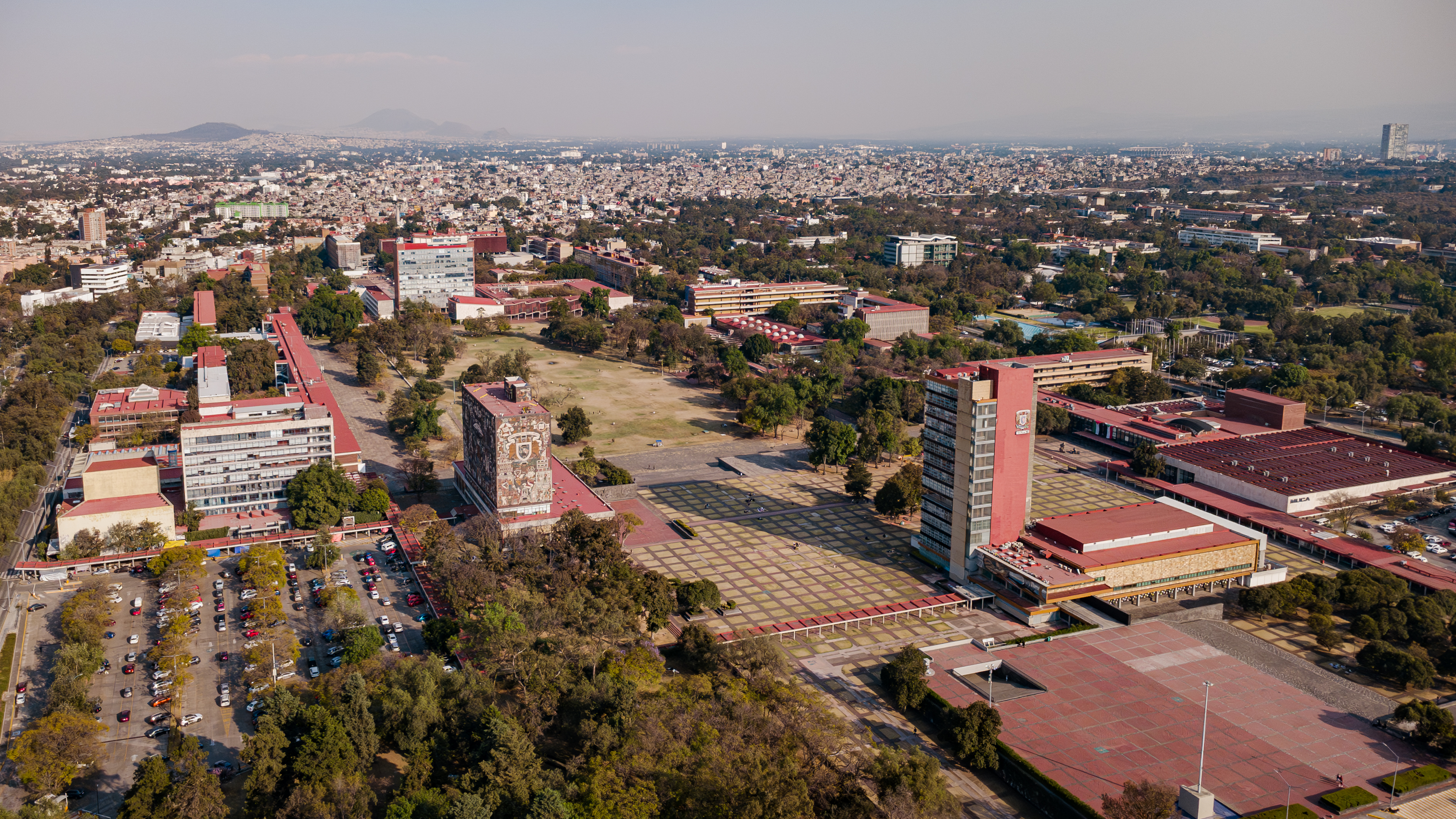
General view of Ciudad Universitaria in Mexico City

"Ciudad Universitaria" (University City) is UNAM's main campus, located within the Coyoacán borough in the southern part of Mexico City. The construction of UNAM's central campus was the original idea of two students from the National School of Architecture in 1928: Mauricio De Maria y Campos and Marcial Gutiérrez Camarena. It was designed by architects Mario Pani, Armando Franco Rovira, Enrique del Moral, Eugenio Peschard, Ernesto Gómez Gallardo Argüelles, Domingo García Ramos, and others such as Mauricio De Maria y Campos who always showed great interest in participating in the project. Architects De Maria y Campos, Del Moral, and Pani were given the responsibility as directors and coordinators to assign each architect to each selected building or constructions which enclose the Estadio Olímpico Universitario, about 40 schools and institutes, the Cultural Center, an ecological reserve, the Central Library, the National Library of Mexico and a few museums. It was built during the 1950s on an ancient solidified lava bed to replace the scattered buildings in downtown Mexico City, where classes were given. It was completed in 1954, and is almost a separate region within Mexico City, with its own regulations, councils, police, transportation and even a supermarket.

In June 2007, its main campus, Ciudad Universitaria, was declared a UNESCO World Heritage Site.

=== Satellite campuses ===
Location of the different UNAM campuses. Green: Greater Mexico City. Blue: Satellite campuses. Red: Minor stations and centres.

Apart from University City (Ciudad Universitaria), UNAM has several campuses in the Metropolitan Area of Mexico City (Acatlán, Aragón, Cuautitlán, Iztacala, and Zaragoza), as well as many others in several locations across Mexico (in Santiago de Querétaro, Morelia, Mérida, Sisal, Ensenada, Cuernavaca, Temixco and Leon), mainly aimed at research and graduate studies. Its School of Music, formerly the National School of Music, is located in Coyoacán. Its Center of Teaching for Foreigners has a campus in Taxco, in the southern Mexican state of Guerrero, focusing in Spanish language and Mexican culture for foreigners, as well as locations in the upscale neighborhood of Polanco in central Mexico City.

The university has extension schools in the United States, and Canada, focusing on the Spanish language, English language, Mexican culture, and, in the case of UNAM Canada, French language: UNAM San Antonio, Texas; UNAM Los Angeles, California; UNAM Chicago, Illinois; Gatineau, Quebec; and Seattle, Washington.

It operates Centers for Mexican Studies and/or Centers of Teaching for Foreigners in Beijing, China (jointly with the Beijing Foreign Studies University); Madrid, Spain (jointly with the Cervantes Institute); San Jose, Costa Rica (jointly with the University of Costa Rica); London, United Kingdom (with King's College London); Paris, France (jointly with Paris-Sorbonne University); and Northridge, California, United States (jointly with California State University Northridge).

=== Museums and buildings of interest ===
==== Palacio de Minería ====
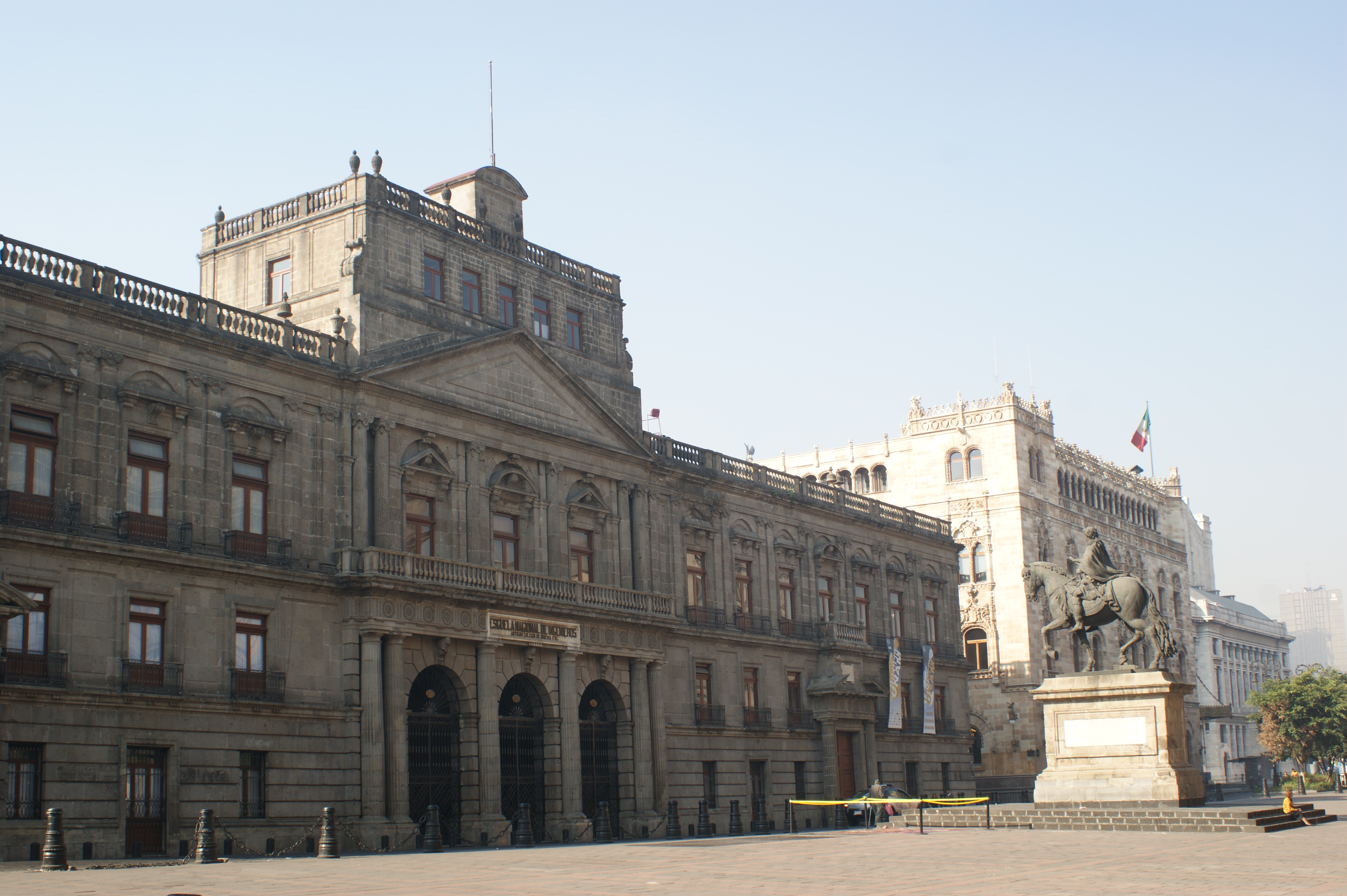
Colegio de Minería (College of Mining) building on Tacuba street in the historic center of Mexico City.

Under the care of the School of Engineering, UNAM, the Colonial Palace of Mining is located in the historical center of Mexico City. Formerly the School of Engineering, it has three floors, and hosts the International Book Expo ("Feria Internacional del Libro" or "FIL") and the International Day of Computing Security Congress ("DISC"). It also has a permanent exhibition of historical books, mostly topographical and naturalist works of 19th-century Mexican scientists, in the former library of the School of Engineers. It also contains several exhibitions related to mining, the prime engineering occupation during the Spanish colonization. It is considered to be one of the most significant examples of Mexican architecture of its period, conceived by Manuel Tolsa during de Spanish colonial rule in a neoclassical style (18th century).

It hosts every year one of Mexico's top book fairs, known in Spanish as Feria Internacional del Libro de Palacio de Mineria. Which is more than 40 years old and has each year more than 100,000 attendants.

==== Casa del Lago ====
The House of the Lake, in Chapultepec Park, is a place devoted to cultural activities, including dancing, theater, and ballet. It also serves as a meeting place for university-related organizations and committees.

==== National Biodiversity Pavilion ====
Opened in 2021, with the sponsorship of Carlos Slim, the museum hosts a number of permanent exhibits which consist mostly on samples of local flora and fauna from Mexico.

==== Museum of San Ildefonso ====
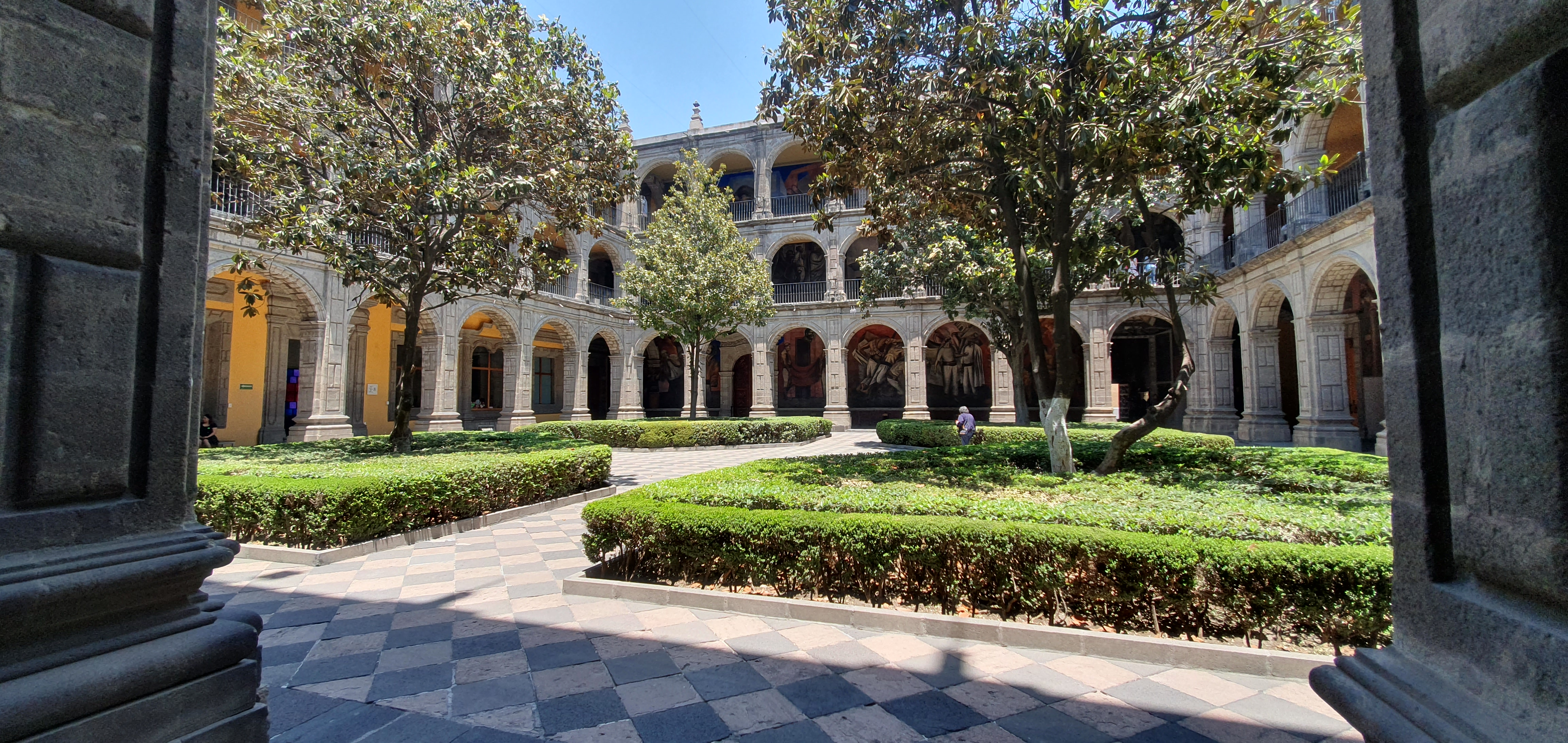
Courtyard of the College of San Ildefonso. Downtown Mexico City.

This museum and cultural center is considered to be the birthplace of the Mexican muralism movement. San Ildefonso began as a prestigious Jesuit boarding school, and after the Reform War, it gained educational prestige again as National Preparatory School, which was closely linked to the founding of UNAM. This school, and the building, closed completely in 1978, then reopened as a museum and cultural center in 1994, administered jointly by UNAM, the National Council for Culture and Arts and the government of the Federal District of Mexico City. The museum has permanent and temporary art and archaeological exhibitions, in addition to the many murals painted on its walls by José Clemente Orozco, Diego Rivera and others. The complex is located between San Ildefonso Street and Justo Sierra Street in the historic center of Mexico City.

==== Chopo University Museum ====
The Chopo University Museum possesses an artistic architecture, large crystal panels and two iron towers designed by Gustave Eiffel. It opened with part of the collection of the now-defunct Public Museum of Natural History, Archeology and History, which eventually became the National Museum of Cultures. It served the National Museum of Natural History for almost 50 years, and is now devoted to the temporary exhibitions of visual arts.

==== Museo Experimental El Eco ====
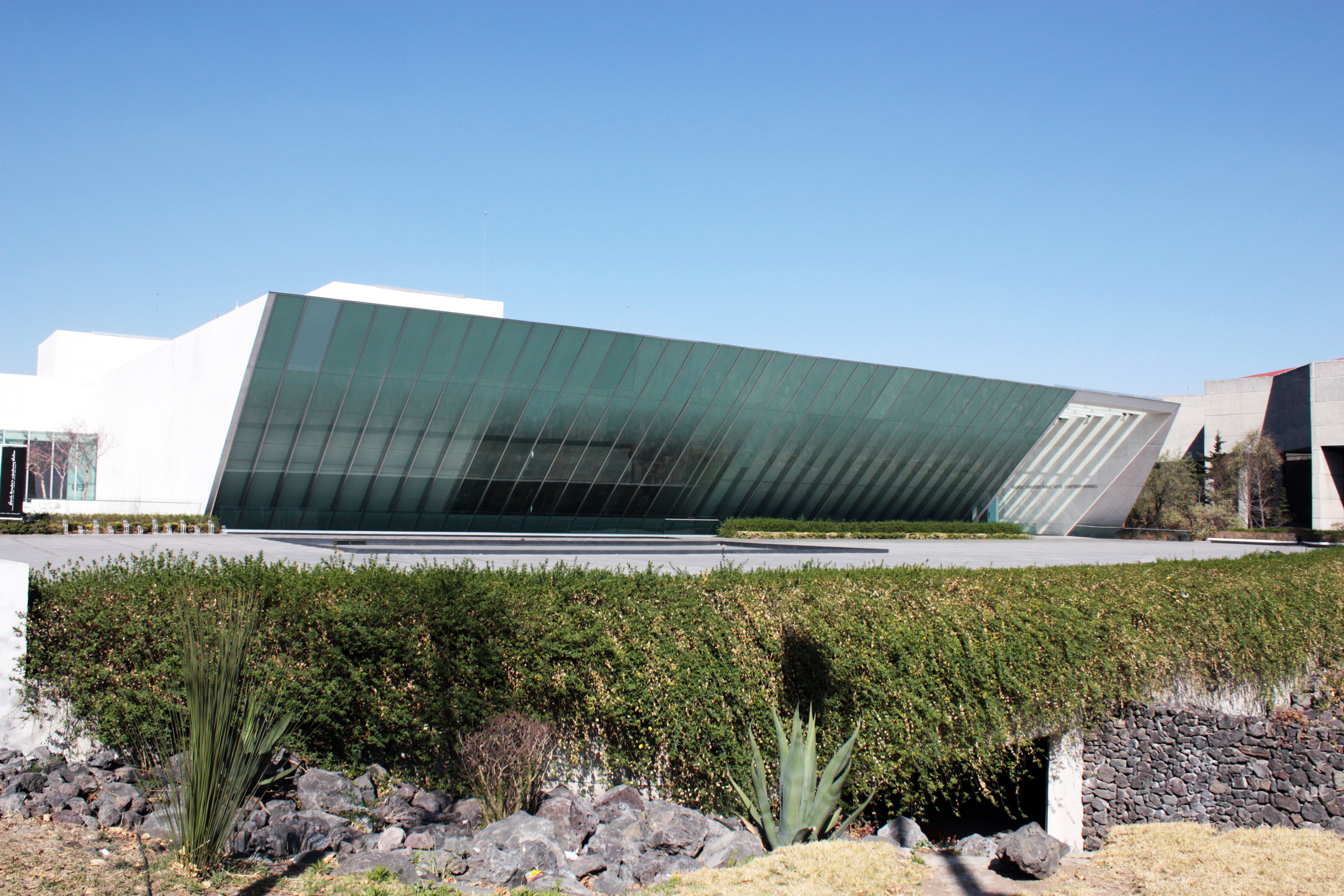
University Museum of Modern Art (MUAC).

The Museo Experimental El Eco is one of the two buildings by German modern artist Mathias Goeritz and an example of Emotional architecture. Goeritz was a close collaborator of architect Luis Barragán and author of several public sculptures including the Torres de Satélite. The building was acquired and renovated by the National University in 2004 and since 2005 it exhibits contemporary art and a yearly architecture competition Pabellón Eco.

==== National Astronomical Observatory ====
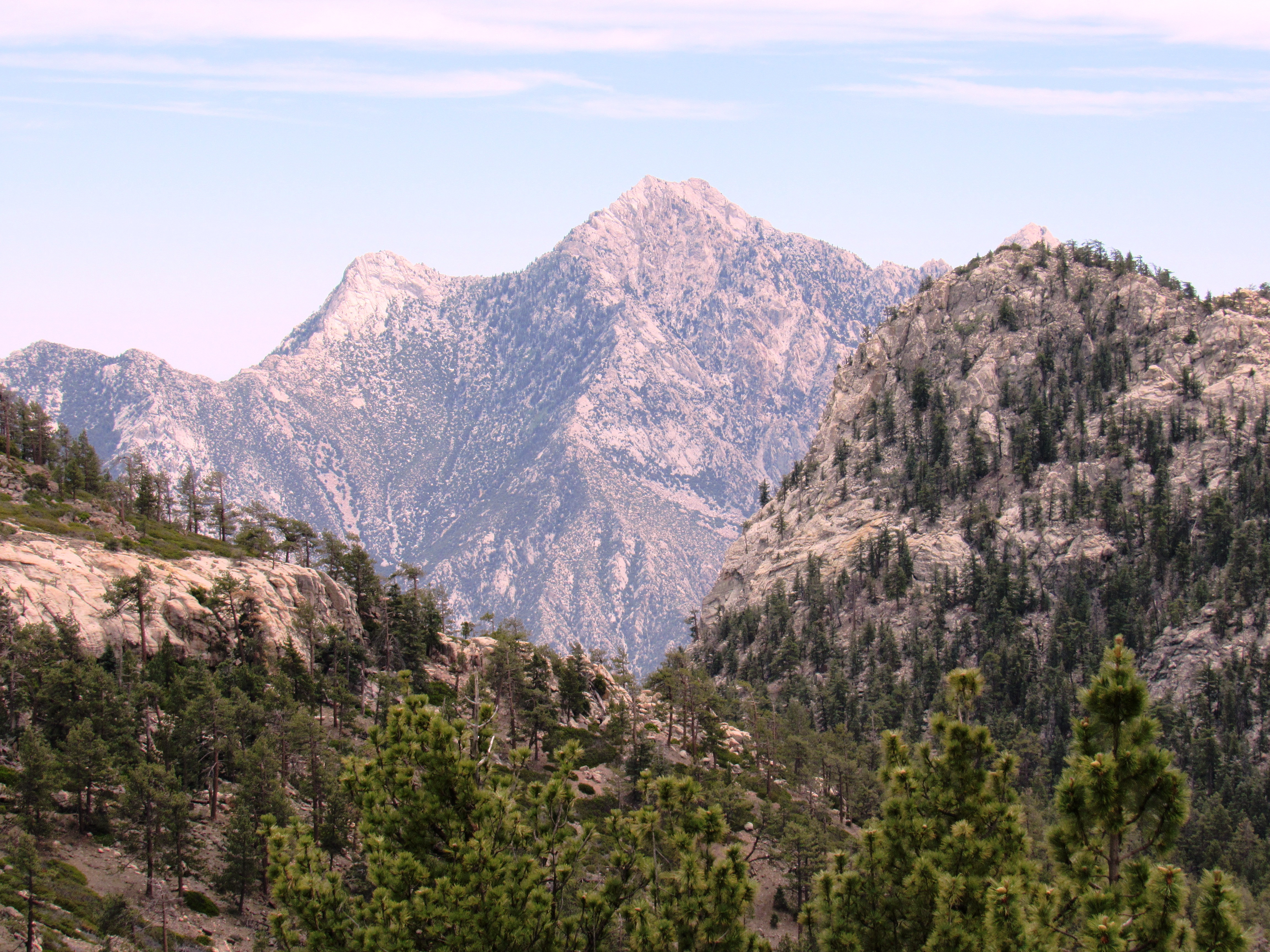
The university's San Pedro Mártir Observatory in Baja California.

The National Astronomical Observatory is located in the Sierra San Pedro Mártir mountain range in Baja California, about 130 km south of United States-Mexican border. It has been in operation since 1970, and it currently has three large reflecting telescopes.

== Academics ==
UNAM is organized in schools or colleges, rather than departments. Both undergraduate and graduate studies are available. UNAM is also responsible for the Escuela Nacional Preparatoria (ENP) (National Preparatory School), and the Colegio de Ciencias y Humanidades (CCH) (Science and Humanities College), which consist of several high schools, in Mexico City. Counting ENES, CCH, FES (Facultad de Estudios Superiores), higher-secondary, undergraduate and graduate students, UNAM has over 324,413 students, making it one of the world's largest universities.

=== Schools and colleges ===
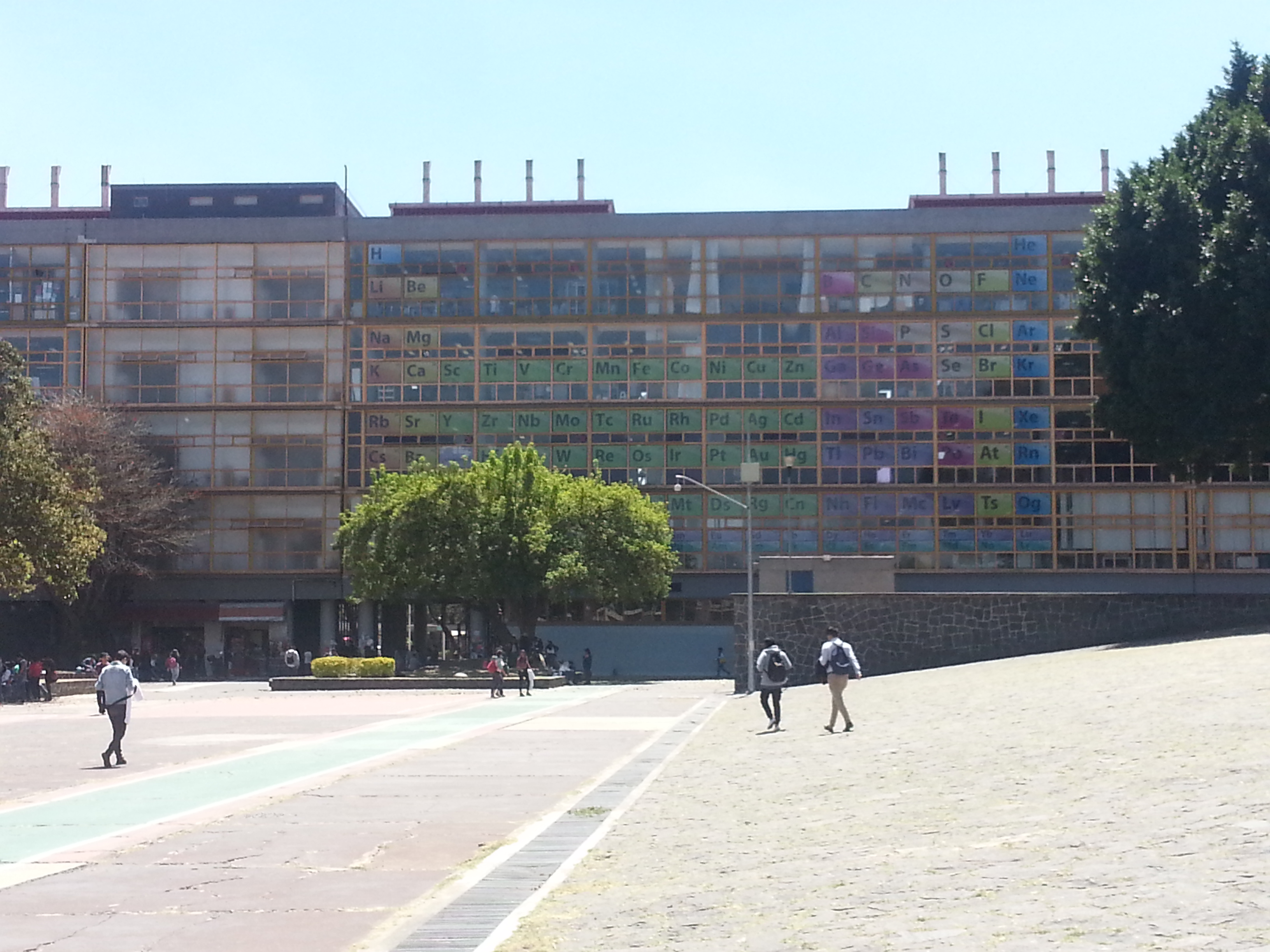
School of Chemistry.

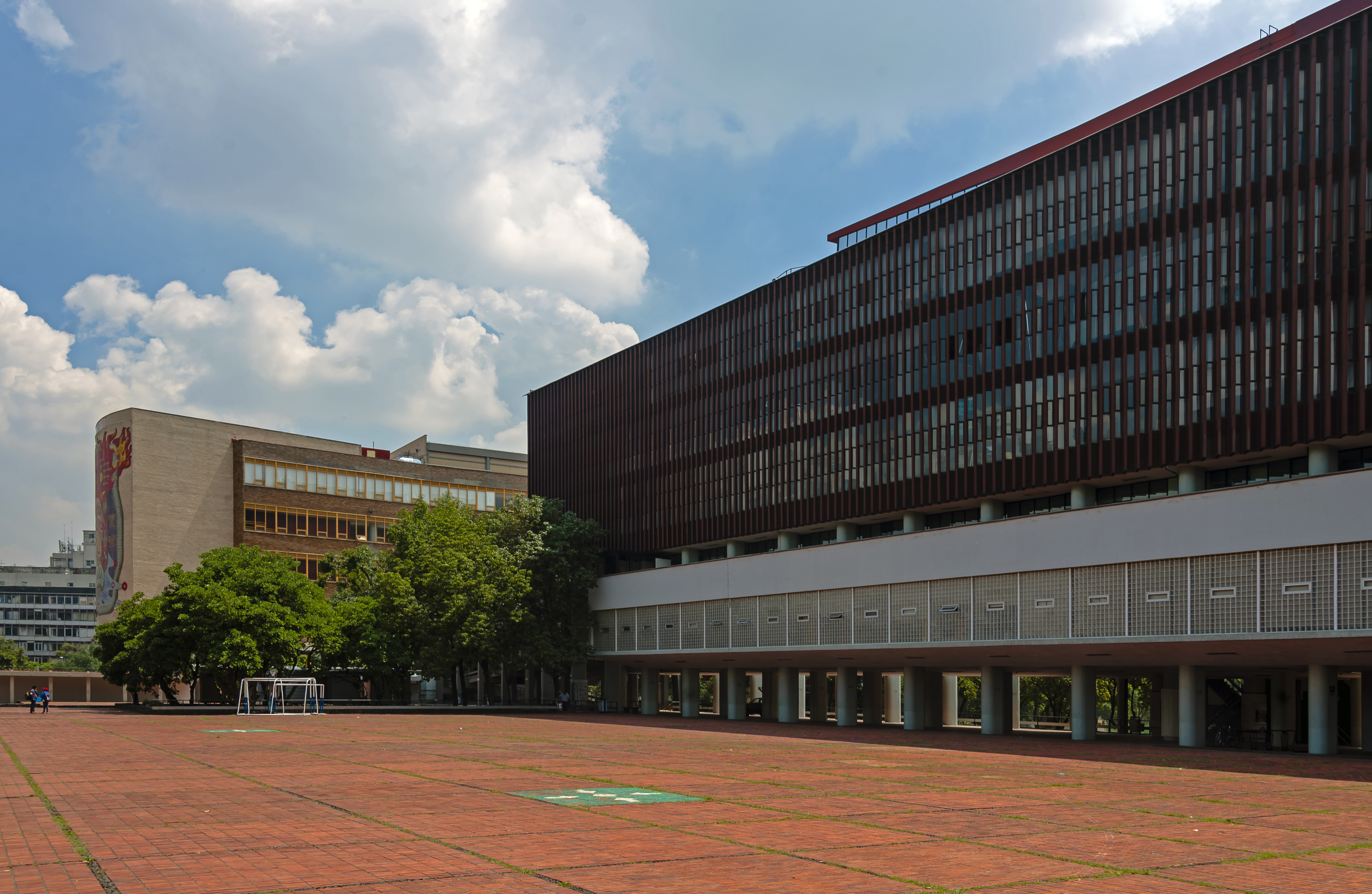
School of medicine.

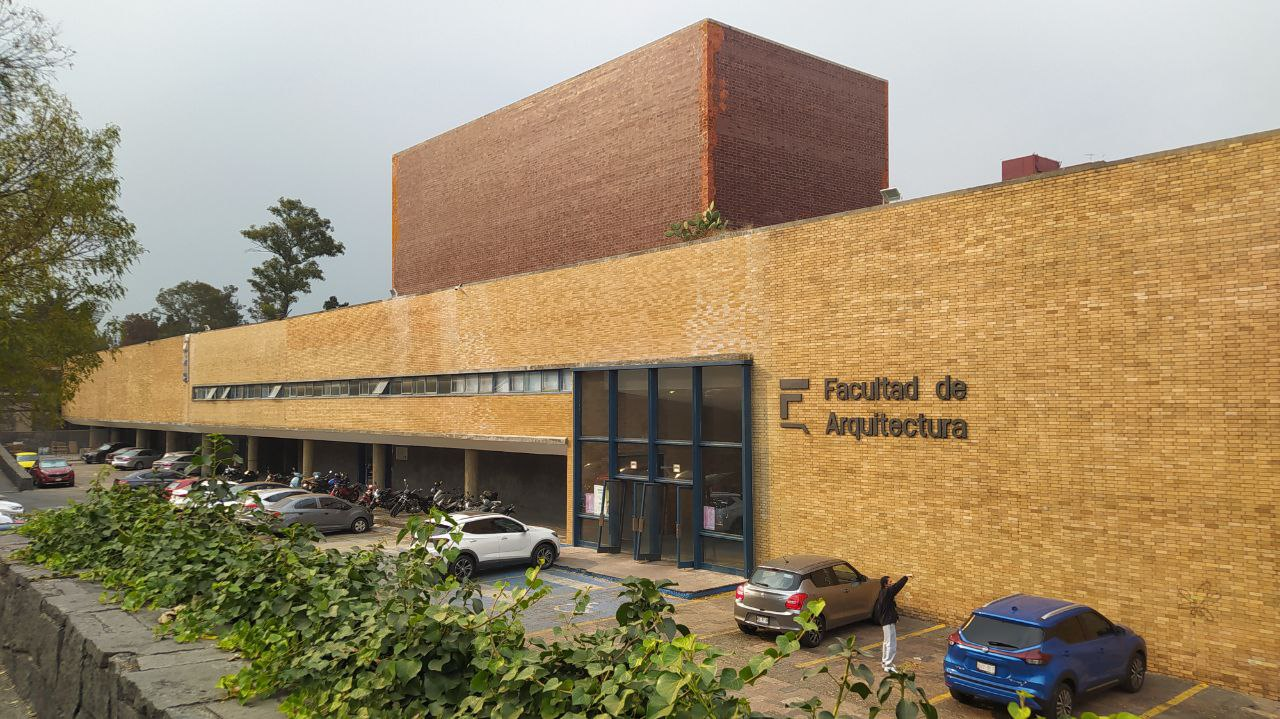
School of Architecture.

UNAM has a set of schools covering different academic fields such as "engineering" or "law". All of UNAM's schools offer undergraduate and graduate studies (master's degrees and PhDs). However, the schools that UNAM calls "national schools" only offer undergraduate studies, as this type of school is mainly focused on practical experience. This is the case of the National School of Nursing and Obstetrics, and the National School of Social Work.

=== List of schools, and institutes ===
- Schools (all of these offer undergraduate and graduate degrees)
  - School of Accounting and Administration
  - School of Architecture
  - School of Arts and Design
  - School of Chemistry
  - School of Economics
  - School of Engineering
  - School of High Studies (FES) Acatlán
  - School of High Studies (FES) Aragón
  - School of High Studies (FES) Cuautitlán
  - School of High Studies (FES) Iztacala
  - School of High Studies (FES) Zaragoza
  - School of Law
  - School of Medicine
  - School of Music
  - School of Odontology
  - School of Philosophy and Letters
  - School of Political and Social Sciences
  - School of Psychology
  - School of Sciences
  - School of Veterinarian Medicine and Animal Science
- National Schools (only have undergraduate degrees)
  - National School of Cinematographic Arts
  - National School of Earth Sciences
  - National School of Languages, Linguistics and Translation
  - National School of Nursing and Obstetrics
  - National School of Social Work
  - National Preparatory School (with 9 high schools)
  - National School of High Studies Morelia (in the state of Michoacan)
  - National School of High Studies León (in the state of Guanajuato)
  - National School of High Studies Mérida (in the state of Yucatán)
  - National School of High Studies Juriquilla (in the state of Querétaro)
  - National School 'College of Sciences and Humanities' (with five high schools)

=== Open University and Distance Education System ===
The Open University and Distance Education System or "Sistema de Universidad Abierta y Educación a Distancia" (SUAyED) is an alternative to the university's on-campus education. The open education programs require on-campus attendance at least once every 15 days, usually on Saturdays (semi-presence). The distance education programs are entirely online using content provided through online platforms where students, teachers, and peers communicate online. About 32,000 of UNAM's students are enrolled in open or distance programs.

SUAyED offers bachelor and postgraduate degrees.

=== Rankings ===
UNAM is consistently ranked as the best university in Mexico by most academic rankings, as well as one of the top 10 in Latin America. World rankings tend to position it within the 100 to 300 range.

Academic rankings of UNAM from 2012 to 2023 according to several sources.

== Research ==
UNAM has excelled in many areas of research. For instance, it was recognized by UNESCO as producing globally some of the most impactful research on Artificial Intelligence. It has also consistently secured top positions in the international robotics competition RoboCup, often claiming first places. The university houses many of Mexico's premiere research institutions. UNAM is currently recognized as one of the most international research universities in Latin America.

Despite the low percentage of funding invested in research and development in Mexico, the UNAM stands out as a research-oriented university with international competitiveness across all fields of knowledge. The UNAM is likely also the Mexican institution, whether public or private, with the greatest infrastructure and investment in basic research. For instance, some studies have attributed to it more than 50% of Mexico's scientific production, followed by several prominent public universities (e.g., CINVESTAV/IPN, UAM, UdeG, UANL), public hospitals, and research centers directly affiliated with the National Council of Science and Technology.

In recent years, it has attracted students and hired professional scientists from all over the world, most notably from Europe, other countries in Latin America, India, and the United States, creating a unique and diverse scientific community.

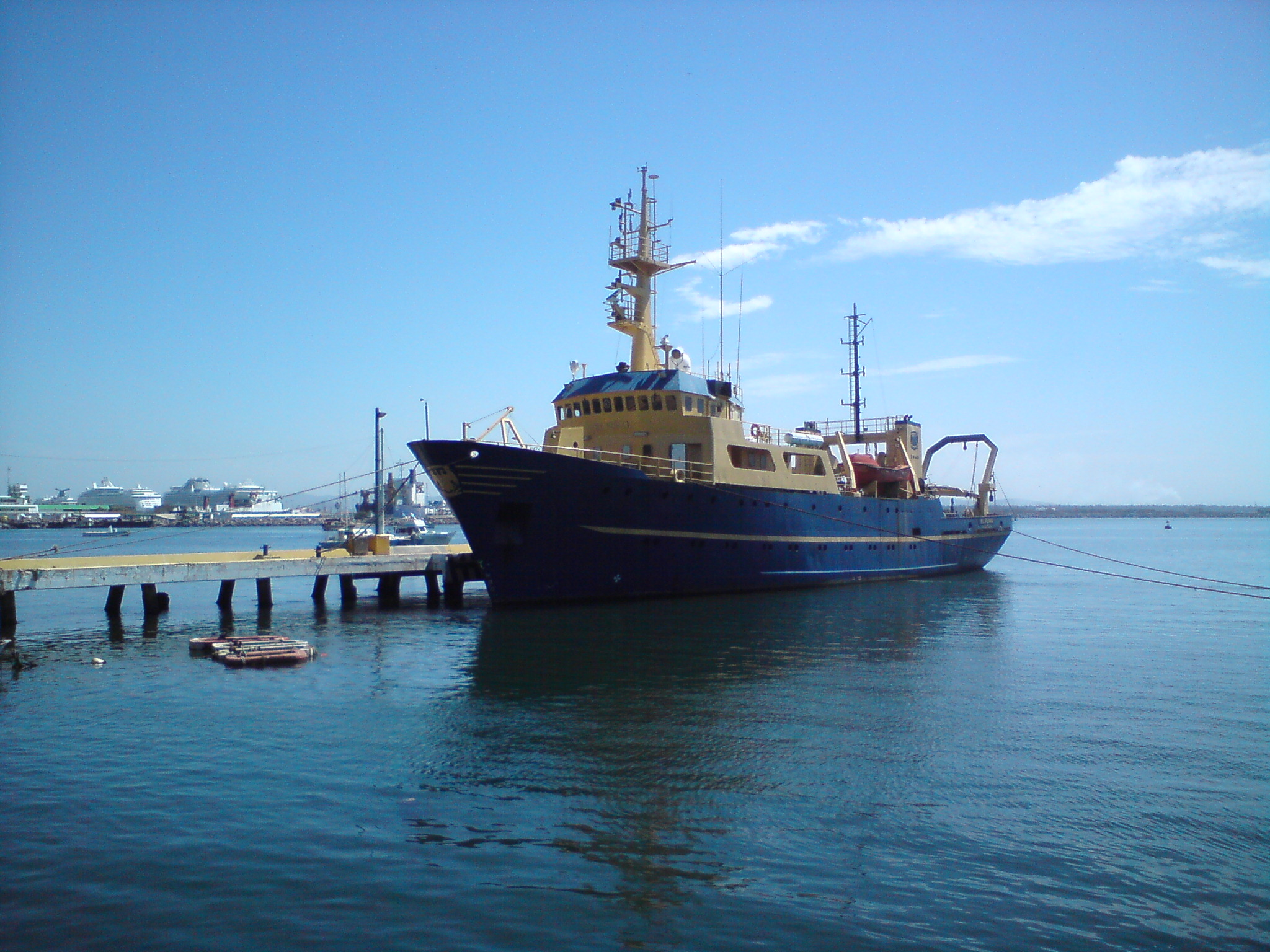
Vessel for oceanography research.

Scientific research at UNAM is divided between colleges, institutes, centers, and schools, and covers a range of disciplines in Latin America. Some notable UNAM institutes include the Institute of Astronomy, the Institute of Biotechnology, the Institute of Nuclear Sciences, the Institute of Ecology, the Institute of Physics, Institute of Renewable Energies, the Institute of Cell Physiology, the Institute of Geophysics, the Institute of Engineering, the Institute of Materials Research, the Institute of Chemistry, the Institute of Biomedical Sciences, and the Applied Mathematics and Systems Research Institute.

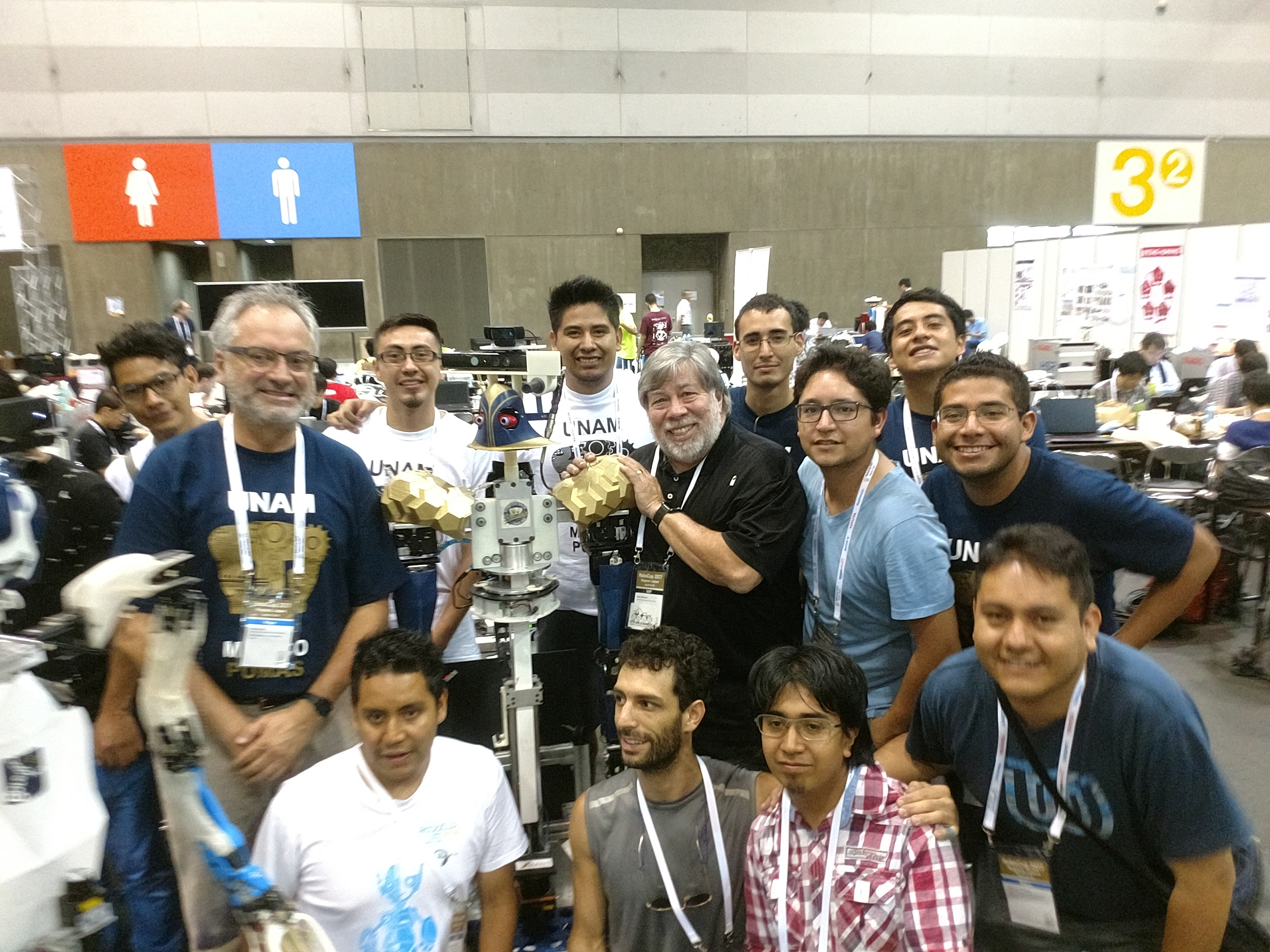
UNAM's robotics' team winning awards in the international Robocup competition.

Research centers tend to focus on multidisciplinary problems particularly relevant to Mexico and the developing world, most notably, the Center for Applied Sciences and Technological Development, which focuses on connecting the sciences to real-world problems (e.g., optics, nanosciences), and Center for Energy Research, which conducts world-class research in alternative energies.

All research centers are open to students from around the world. The UNAM holds a number of programs for students within the country, using scientific internships to encourage research in the country.

UNAM currently installed its first supercomputer Sirio (Cray Y/MP) in 1991. Since 2013 it operates a supercomputer named Miztli (HP) for scientific research.

== Athletics ==
=== Professional football club ===
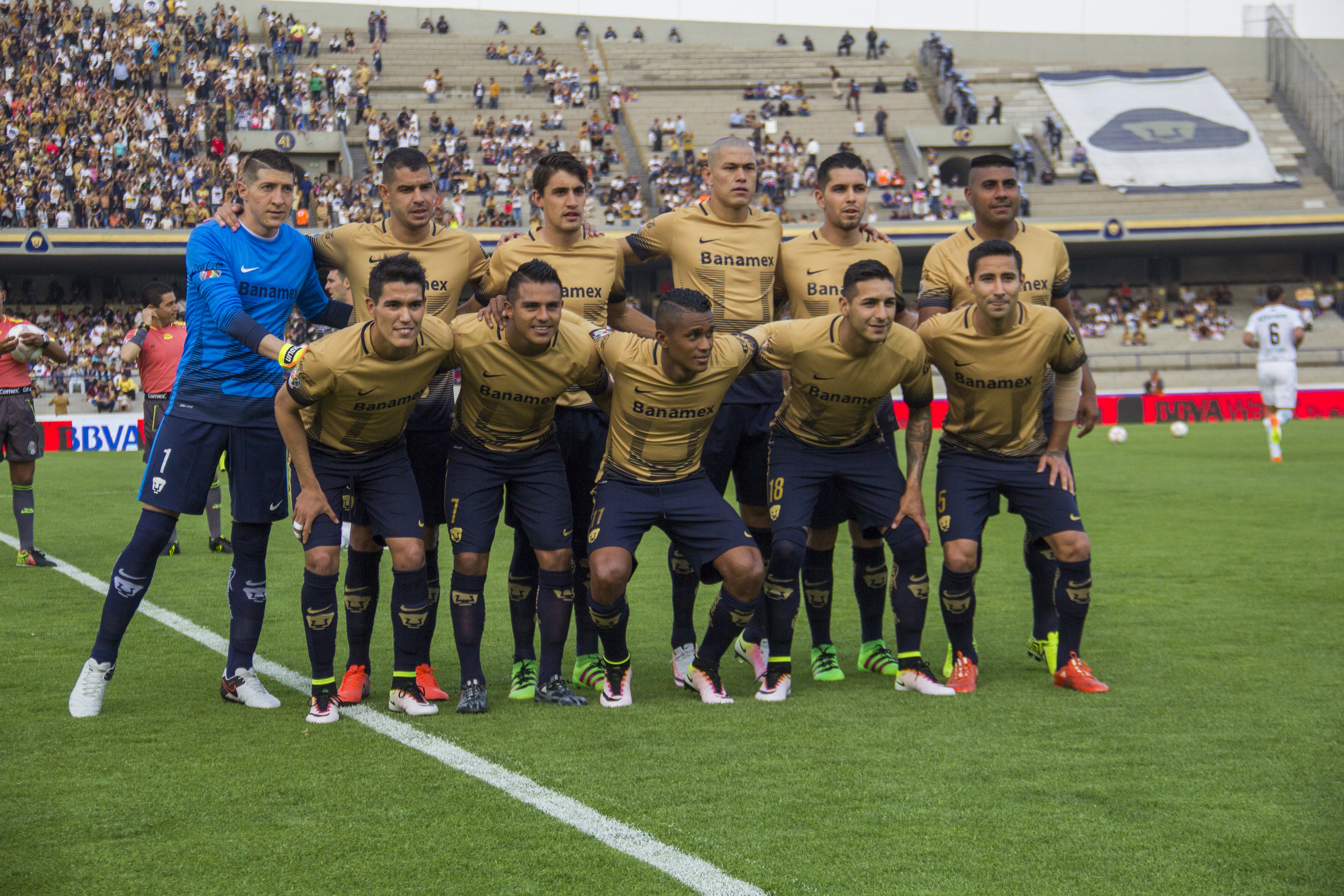
UNAM's present-day Pumas football team. The team was originally created for alumni.

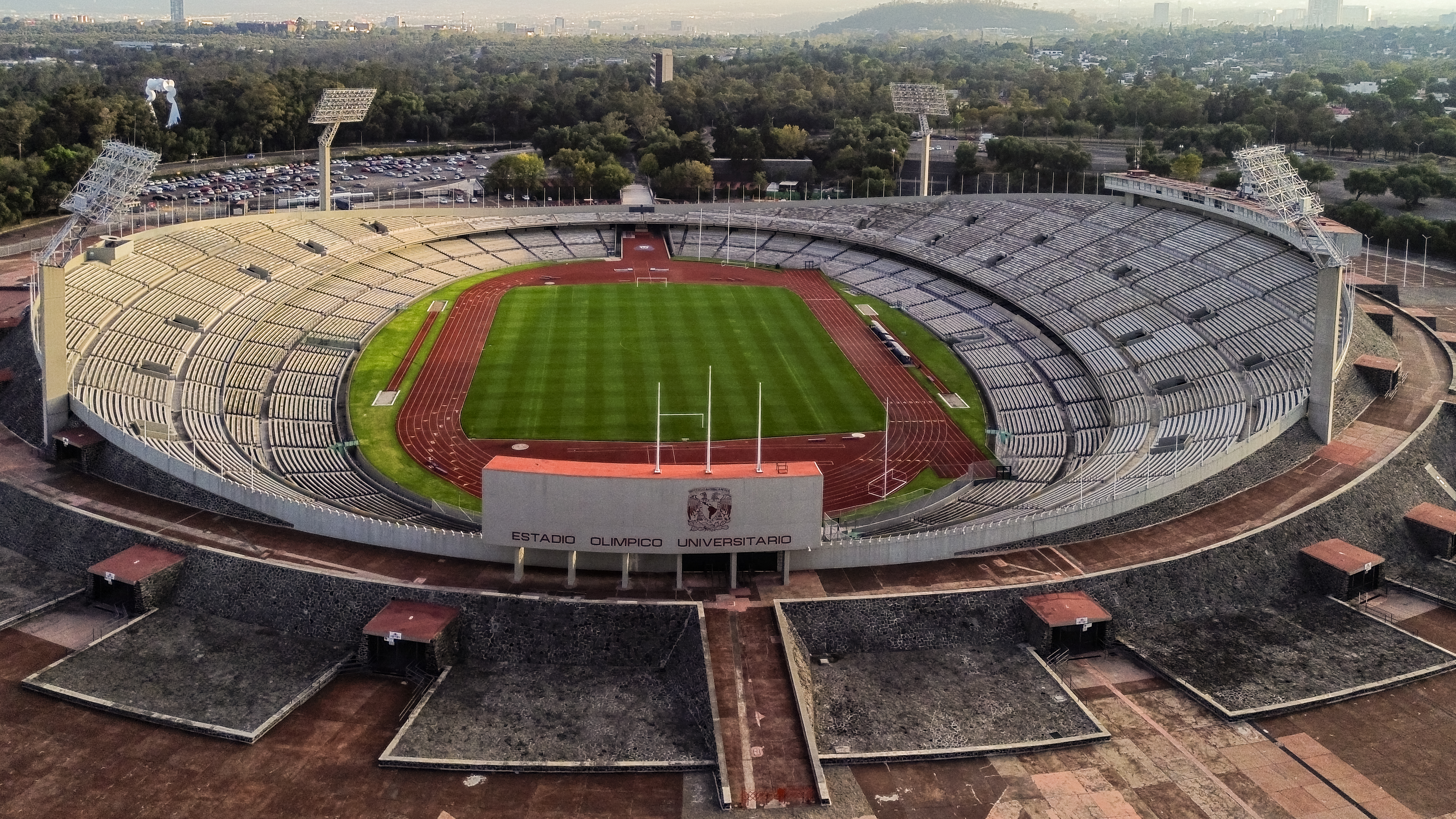
A view of the University Olympic Stadium.

UNAM's football club, Club Universidad Nacional, participates in Liga MX, the top division of Mexican football. The club became two-time consecutive champions of the Apertura, and the Clausura in 2004. Their home ground is the Estadio Olímpico Universitario.

=== College football team ===
The Pumas CU represents UNAM in college football since 1927. Is one of the most successful football programs in Mexico.The team maintains an historic fierce rivalry with the National Polytechnic Institute (IPN) football program, the "Águilas Blancas" (White Eagles), due to both of them being the biggest public universities in the country.

=== Pumas volleyball team ===
UNAM's volleyball team, Pumas, has had great success on a national and international level. The manager for Mexico's representative volleyball team is from Pumas, and several players representing Mexico are also UNAM students and alumni. They played in the Olympics at Rio.

== Culture ==
=== Seal ===
The university logo was designed by José Vasconcelos in 1920, a prolific ideologue of pan-American identity and Mexican culture in particular. As rector of the university, he expressed the importance of ending the oppression and the bloody confrontations of yesteryear, with the new battlefields being those of culture and education, as means to achieve a new era of unification of Latin Americans. He imprinted this vision in the university seal, featuring a Mexican eagle and an Andean condor, forming a double-headed eagle supported by an allegory of volcanoes and cacti (a reference to the foundational myth of Tenochtitlan). In the central part of the shield is the map of Latin America, which goes from the northern border of Mexico to Cape Horn. Framing this map is the phrase "For my people the spirit shall speak." In the upper part of the seal there is a ribbon that says "National Autonomous University of Mexico".

=== Motto ===
The motto that animates the National University, "For my people the spirit shall speak", reveals the humanistic vocation with which it was conceived. The author of this famous phrase, José Vasconcelos, assumed the rectory in 1920, within the framework of the Latin American University Reform, and at a time when the hopes of the Mexican Revolution were still alive; There was a great faith in the homeland, and the redemptive spirit extended into the environment. It "means in this motto the conviction that our race will elaborate a culture of new tendencies, of spiritual and free essence", explained the "Master of America" when presenting the proposal. Later, he would specify: "I imagined the university shield that I presented to the Council, roughly and with a legend: 'For my people the spirit shall speak', pretending to mean that we woke up from a long night of oppression"

=== Imagotype ===
On 20 April 1974, the then rector Guillermo Soberón Acevedo presented the new sport's emblem of the UNAM in the Auditorium of the Faculty of Sciences. The university commissioned the design to Manuel Andrade Rodríguez, as part of the renovation of the General Directorate of Sports and Recreation Activities. The image was chosen among 16 works, and required more than 800 sketches.The image type consists of the face of a puma in gold, made from the silhouette of a closed fist, on a blue triangle with rounded corners. In turn, this triangle expresses the three fundamental pillars of the university: Education, Research and the Diffusion of Culture.

The emblem of the puma serves as a seal for the sports teams of the university. In 2013, the British newspaper The Guardian included it in a list of one of the most remarkable club logos in football.

=== Cultural traditions ===
The university has an annual tradition to make a large display of Day of the Dead offerings (Spanish: ofrenda) all over the main square of Ciudad Universitaria. Each school builds an offering, and in the center, there is usually a large offering made according to a theme corresponding to the festivities of the university for that year.

=== Political activism ===
UNAM students and professors are regarded throughout Mexico as politically very active, generally speaking. Since 2000, a small building at the School of Humanities (near the central library) has been effectively under the control of an anarcho-communist student group, who renamed the place from "Justo Sierra Auditorium" to "Che Guevara Auditorium". While most of its students usually adhere to left-wing political ideologies and movements, the university has also produced several prominent right-wing and neoliberal politicians and businessmen, such as President Carlos Salinas de Gortari, catholic rector Manuel Gómez Morín and magnate Carlos Slim.

UNAM's history has made it a strong advocate of minorities, especially women in tech. The school of engineering has organized along with Google some of the largest all Latina Hackathons. UNAM along with Google has organized large scale Latina Hackathons.

=== Student associations ===
The UNAM contains several associations of current students and alumni that provide extra-curricular activities to the whole community, enriching the university's activities with cultural, social, and scientific events.

- Fundación UNAM
- Nibiru Sociedad Astronomica
- SAFIR

== Notable people ==
=== Nobel laureates ===
All three of Mexico's Nobel laureates are alumni of UNAM:

- Alfonso García Robles (alumnus) - Nobel Peace Prize, 1982
- Octavio Paz (alumnus) - Nobel Prize in Literature, 1990
- Mario Molina (alumnus) - Nobel Prize in Chemistry, 1995

In addition, eleven faculty of UNAM have taken part of the Nobel Peace Prize (Ana María Cetto twice), in 1995, 2005 and 2007; as members of the Pugwash Conference, the International Atomic Energy Agency and the Intergovernmental Panel on Climate Change.

=== Noted faculty ===
See also Category:Academic staff of the National Autonomous University of Mexico

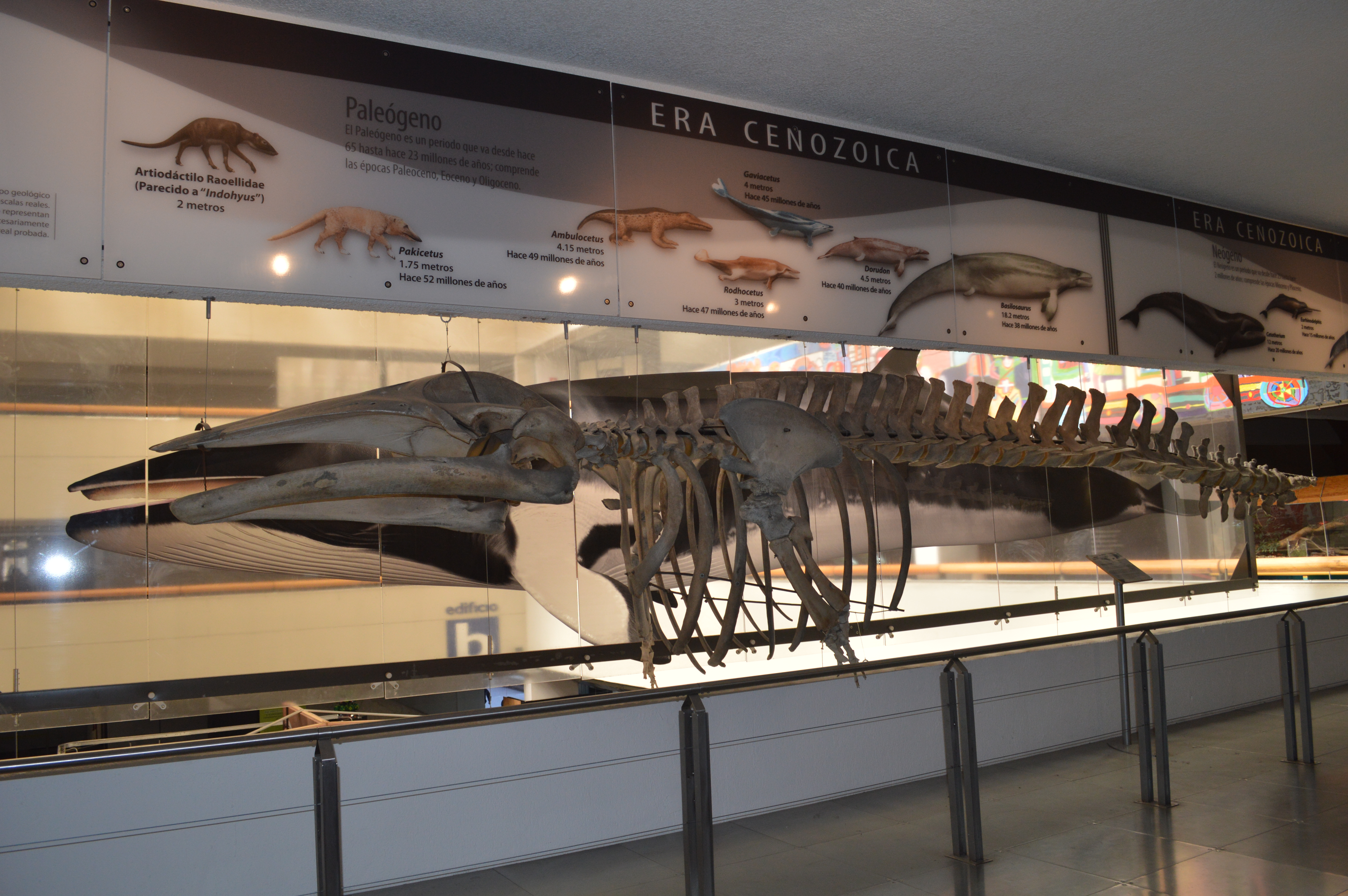
Science museum, UNIVERSUM.

- Miguel Alcubierre, theoretical physicist
- Gabriel Careaga Medina, sociologist
- Maria Leoba Castañeda Rivas, lawyer
- Max Cetto, architect
- Mónica Clapp, mathematician
- Javier Corral Jurado, politician
- Jesús A. De Loera, mathematician
- Erich Fromm, philosopher and psychoanalyst
- Adolfo Gilly, historian
- Teodoro González de León, architect
- Jorge González Torres, politician
- José Gaos, philosopher
- Omar Guerrero, doctor of public administration
- Laura Hernández Guzmán, psychologist
- Isabel Hubard Escalera, mathematician
- José Miguel Insulza, a Chilean politician, secretary of the Organization of American States
- Paul Kirchhoff, anthropologist and ethnohistorian
- Arnoldo Kraus, physician
- Larry Laudan, philosopher
- Enrique Leff, political ecologist and economist
- Miguel León-Portilla, historian and Nahuatl language researcher
- Florian Luca, mathematician
- Rodrigo Medellín, ecologist
- Rodolfo Neri Vela, astronaut
- Edmundo O'Gorman, historian and writer
- Kiyoto Ota, sculptor
- Margarita Peña (1937-2018), writer, educator
- Barbara J. Price, Fulbright professor of anthropology
- Arturo Rosenblueth, physiologist
- Graciela Salicrup (1935–1982), architect, archaeologist and mathematician
- Juan José Sánchez Sosa, psychologist
- Adolfo Sánchez Vázquez, a Spanish-born philosopher
- Manuel Sandoval Vallarta, physicist and cosmic ray researcher
- Sara Sefchovich, writer
- Bernardo Sepúlveda Amor, lawyer
- Carlos Slim, businessman and one of the richest people in the world
- Dania Gutiérrez Mexican biological engineer
- Siobhan Guerrero Mc Manus Mexican philosopher and humanist

=== Noted alumni ===
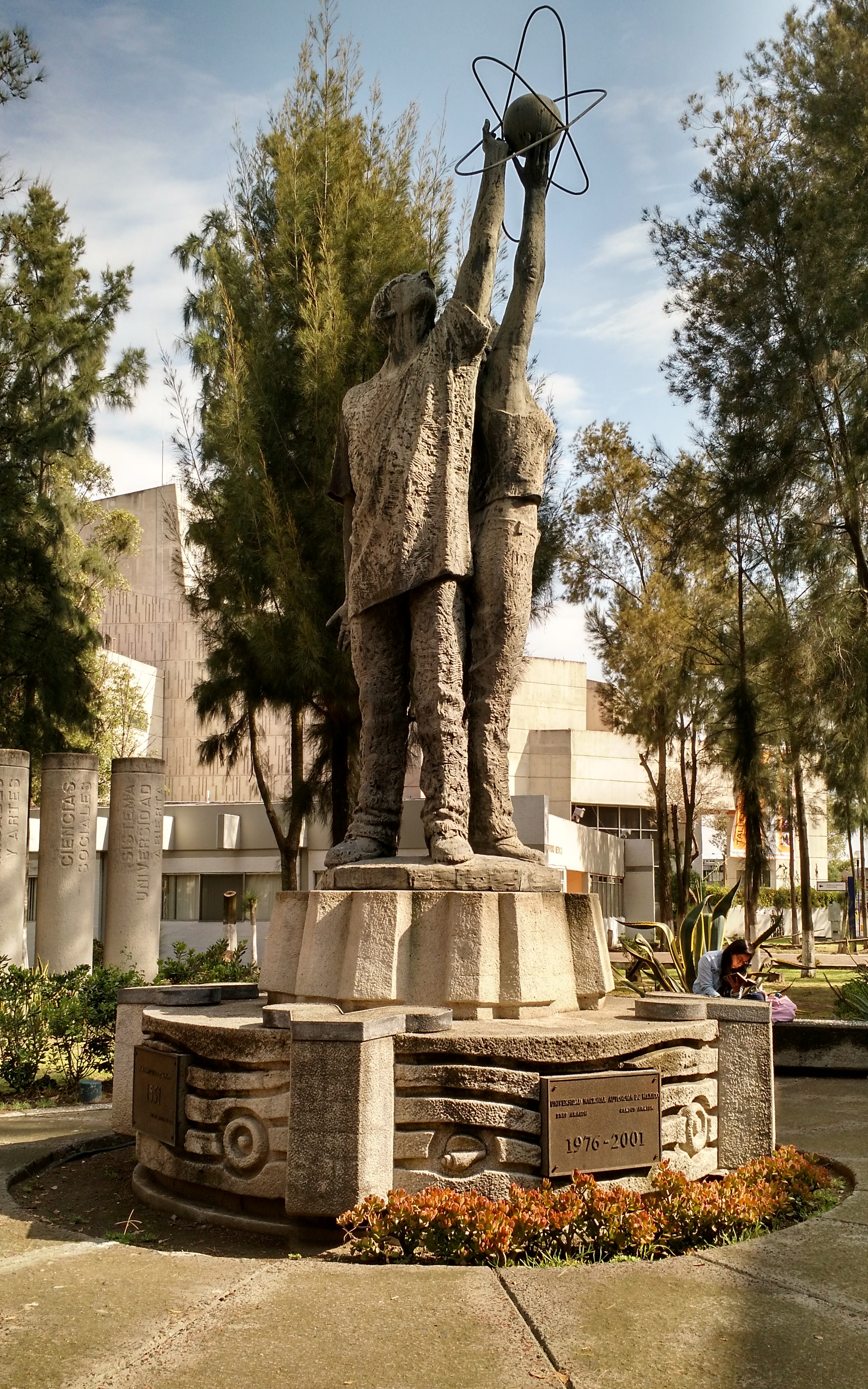
Square of the Student. Faculty of Higher Education (FES) Aragón. One of the five UNAM campuses in Greater Mexico City.

See also Category:National Autonomous University of Mexico alumni

==== World heads of state ====
- Abel Pacheco (President of Costa Rica 2002–2006)
- Adolfo López Mateos (President of Mexico 1958–1964)
- Alfonso Portillo (President of Guatemala 2000–2004)
- Carlos Salinas de Gortari (President of Mexico 1988–1994)
- José López Portillo y Pacheco (President of Mexico 1976–1982)
- Luis Echeverría (President of Mexico 1970–1976)
- Miguel Alemán Valdés (President of Mexico 1946–1952)
- Miguel de la Madrid Hurtado (President of Mexico 1982–1988)
- Andrés Manuel López Obrador (Mayor of Mexico City from 2000 to 2005, President of Mexico 2018–2024)
- Claudia Sheinbaum (scientist, Mayor of Mexico City, President of Mexico 2024-present)

==== Politicians ====
- Abel Pacheco (President of Costa Rica)
- Alan Cranston (U.S. Senator from California) - one summer
- Álvaro García Linera (vice-president of Bolivia, did not graduate)
- Alejandro Encinas (Mayor of Mexico City)
- Antonio Carrillo Flores (Cabinet Minister in several previous administrations, 1929, 1950)
- Carlos Mendoza Davis (Governor of Baja California Sur)
- Fernando Baeza Melendez (Senator and Governor of Chihuahua)
- Luis Félix López (Secretary of Government of Ecuador)
- Manlio Fabio Beltrones Rivera (Deputy, Senator and Governor of Sonora)
- Miguel Ángel Mancera (Mayor of Mexico City)
- Mark Kirk (U.S. Senator from Illinois, did not graduate)
- Rosario Robles (Mexican politician who served as the Secretary of Social Development)
- Santiago Creel (senator)
- Veton Surroi (Kosovo publicist and leader of the Kosovar Party ORA)
- Xóchitl Gálvez (Mexican Senator and Mexican presidential candidate)

==== Diplomats ====
- Antonio Carrillo Flores (Ministry of Mexican Foreign Affairs during the Díaz Ordaz administration)
- Jaime Torres Bodet (writer and politician, UNESCO Director-General (1948-1952))
- Narciso Bassols (former ambassador to Russia, France, and Great Britain; former director of UNAM's School of Law)
- Norma Lucía Piña Hernández (President of Mexico's Supreme Court of Justice of the Nation (Chief Justice))
- Marco Antonio Garcia Blanco (Ambassador of Mexico to Nigeria)
- Rosario Green (Ministry of Mexican Foreign Affairs during the Zedillo administration)
- Olga Pellicer, Ambassador of Mexico to Austria

==== Artists, writers, and humanists ====
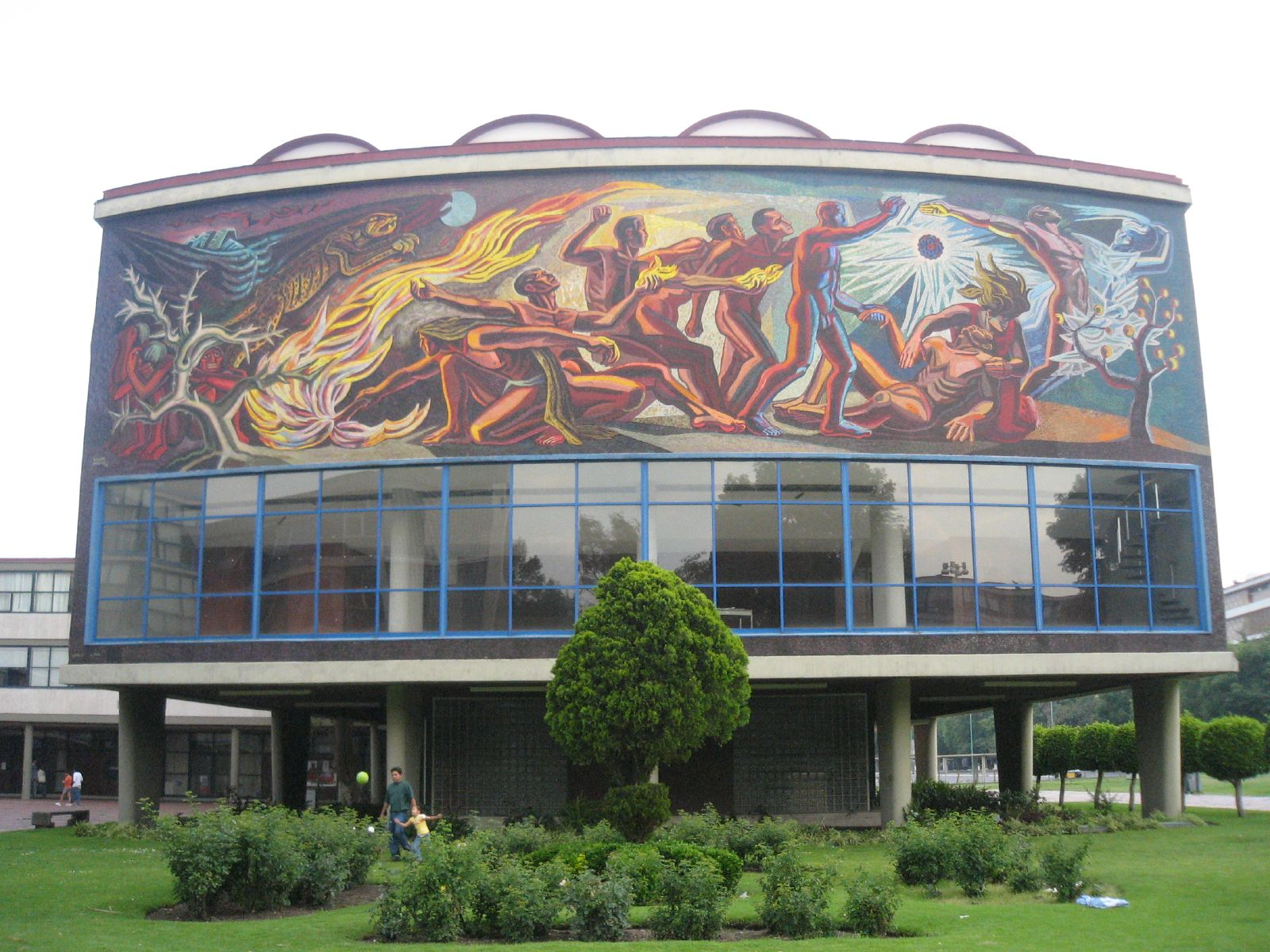
The Conquest of Energy by José Chávez Morado

- Abraham Cruzvillegas (artist)
- Adolfo Sánchez Vázquez (philosopher and writer)
- Agustín Landa Verdugo (architect and urban planner)
- Agustín Rayo (philosopher, logician, and Dean of Humanities at MIT)
- Alejandro Rossi (philosopher and writer)
- Alfonso Cuarón (film director)
- Alfonso García Robles (diplomat)
- Asmara Gay (writer and translator)
- Alfonso Reyes (writer, and diplomat)
- Ana Colchero (actress)
- Mercedes Durand (journalist and poet)
- Adelina Nicholls (activist)
- Audre Lorde (writer, poet and activist)
- Emiliano Monge
- Ayako Tsuru (mural artist)
- Bolívar Echeverría (philosopher)
- Carlos Fuentes (essayist)
- Carlos Monsiváis (editorialist and writer)
- Carmen Aristegui (journalist)
- Chespirito (screenwriter)
- Elena Poniatowska (journalist and writer)
- Fernando del Paso (writer)
- Francisco Laguna Correa (writer)
- Guillermo del Toro (filmmaker, author, and actor)
- Horst Matthai Quelle (philosopher)
- Jacobo Zabludovsky (lawyer and journalist)
- Jaime Maussan (television personality)
- Javier Solorzano (journalist)
- Jorge Volpi (novelist and essayist)
- José Emilio Pacheco (writer)
- Josefina Muriel (bibliophile)
- Juan García Esquivel (musician)
- Juan Rulfo (writer)
- Julio Estrada (UNAM scholar)
- Julio Scherer García (author and journalist)
- Ilse Gradwohl (painter)
- Marcela Del Río Reyes (writer and educator)
- Margarita Peña (writer and educator)
- Natalie Korneitsik (journalist, tv person)
- Maruxa Vilalta (dramatist)
- Octavio Paz (poet and essayist)
- Pola Weiss Álvarez (video artist)
- Ricardo Legorreta (laureated architect)
- Rosa Beltrán (writer, lecturer and academic)
- Rosario Castellanos (writer, philosopher, poet, feminist and diplomat)
- Salvador Elizondo (writer)
- Subcomandante Marcos (sociologist)
- Tenoch Huerta (actor)
- Teodoro González de León (architect)
- Veronica Castro (movie star)
- Victoria Espinosa (theatre director, academic and activist)
- William F. Buckley (writer and political philosopher)
- Yael Bitrán (historian and translator)
- Yan María Yaoyólotl Castro (lesbian feminist)
- Yolanda Gutiérrez (dancer and artist)
- David Camorlinga Tagle (sculptor)

==== Physicians and surgeons ====
- Celia Mercedes Alpuche Aranda (deputy general director of the Center for Research on Infectious Diseases (CISEI))
- Carlos Fernández del Castillo (specialist in pancreatic diseases, pancreatobiliary surgery, gastrointestinal surgery at Massachusetts General Hospital, USA)
- Fernando Antonio Bermúdez Arias (prominent physician, cardiologist, scientist, writer, teacher, historian, artist, and social defender)
- Ignacio Chávez (prominent Mexican physician, founded the first cardiology area in the General Hospital of Mexico. He was the rector of the National Autonomous University of Mexico (1965–1966). Founded several Mexican institutions in Cardiology and he was appointed honorary doctor or rector of 95 universities around the world. He was a founding member of El Colegio Nacional (1943).)
- Jorge Calles-Escandón (endocrinologist, specializing in thyroid biopsy, type 1 diabetes, type 2 diabetes, and insulin pumps at Wake Forest Baptist Medical Center, USA)
- David Herzog, eating disorders expert and Endowed Professor in Psychiatry at Harvard Medical School
- Alberto P. León (physician, professor, and Secretary of Health of Mexico)
- Alethse de la Torre Rosas (infectious disease specialist, and Director General of the Centro Nacional para la Prevención y Control del VIH/SIDA)
- Mauricio Tohen, Distinguished Professor, and Chairman of the Department of Psychiatry & Behavioral Sciences at the University of New Mexico
- Nora Volkow (director of the National Institute of Drug Abuse)
- Leopoldo Salazar Viniegra (doctor, psychiatrist)

==== Scientists ====
- Ángela Alessio Robles (civil engineer and town planner)
- Alfonso Caso y Andrade (archaeologist)
- Antonio Lazcano (biologist and evolutionist, director of The Lynn Margulis Centre for Evolutionary Biology)
- Carlos Frenk (astronomer, a pioneer in simulations of large-scale structures)
- Constantino Reyes-Valerio (chemist and historian who coined the term arte indocristiano and contributed to the discovery of the production of Maya blue pigment)
- Eduardo Pareyón Moreno (archaeologist)
- Guido Münch (astronomer and director of the Max Planck Institute for Astronomy)
- Guillermo Haro (astronomer, co-discoverer of Herbig–Haro objects)
- Guillermo Oliver (biologist and professor at Northwestern University)
- Jerzy Rzedowski (plant scientist, pioneer in the field of neotropical floristics)
- Juan J. de Pablo (chemical engineer and vice president for national laboratories, science strategy, innovation, and global initiatives at the University of Chicago)
- Luis E. Miramontes (co-inventor of the contraceptive pill)
- Marcos Moshinsky (theoretical physicist, whose work in the field of elementary particles won him the Prince of Asturias Prize for Scientific and Technical Investigation and the UNESCO Science Prize)
- Mario Molina (co-discoverer of decomposition of ozone with CFC aerosols, Nobel laureate in Chemistry)
- Miguel Alcubierre (theoretical and computational physicist; see Alcubierre metric)
- Miguel de Icaza (free software programmer, co-founder of GNOME)
- Monica Olvera de la Cruz (soft matter theorist)
- Nabor Carrillo Flores (a soil mechanics expert, a nuclear energy advisor and former president of UNAM)
- Ricardo Miledi (neuroscientist, pioneer of the calcium hypothesis of neurotransmitter release)
- Rodolfo Neri Vela (the first Mexican in space)
- Salvador Zubirán (physician, founder of the National Institute of Nutrition)
- Shlomo Eckstein (economist and President of Bar-Ilan University)
- Susana López Charretón (virologist and researcher)
- Víctor Neumann-Lara (pioneer in graph theory)

==== Business people ====
- Carlos Slim (Studied at UNAM's School of Engineering, and became a tech businessman, billionaire, and the current fourth richest person in the world)
- Alfredo Harp Helú (businessman, billionaire, and former owner of the biggest Latin American bank, Banamex).
- Enrique de la Madrid (Studied at UNAM's Law School, and served as one of the directors for Latin America at the HSBC bank.)
- Manuel Gómez Morin (Studied at UNAM's Law School, and was a co-founder and first president of the Bank of Mexico.)
- Arturo Elías Ayub (Business man who was chairman of UNAM Pumas Soccer team.)
- Riobóo Martín (Civil Engineering businessman, founder of "Grupo Riobóo", which has constructed large scale infrastructure projects for Mexico City, including Subway lines 1,2,3, the indoor olympic arena: "Gimnasio Olímpico Juan de la Barrera", the Olympic pool: "Alberca Olímpica Francisco Márquez," and the palace of sports: "Palacio de los Deportes").
- Pepe Carral (Studied at UNAM's Law School, had his own company, and served as one of the directors for Bank of America in Mexico.)
- Delia González (Studied at UNAM's Art School, her company focuses on designing and selling silver Mexican-style jewelry for Macys, Bloomingdales and Juan Gabriel's Funeral).

==== Athletes ====
- Hugo Sánchez (Mexican football player, Real Madrid C.F., former Mexico national team and UD Almería manager)
- Daniel Vargas (Volleyball player and engineer, played for Pumas UNAM, and was part of Mexico men's national volleyball team, where he played at the Olympic Games Rio 2016)
- René Ahumada (born 1935), Mexican Olympic sprinter

==== Activists ====
- Teresa Ulloa Ziáurriz (Mexican human rights activist, graduated with a degree in law in 1984)

== See also ==
- List of universities in Mexico
- DGSCA (Dirección General de Servicios de Cómputo Académico, Hub of Computer Sciences/Engineering in UNAM)
- XHUNAM-TV ("Teveunam", UNAM's educational and cultural television channel)
- Mexican Law Review
