= Nancy Carrasco =

Mexican physician, molecular biochemistry

- Born: Mexico City, Mexico
- Education: School of Chemistry, UNAM; School of Medicine, UNAM
- Spouse: Samuel Zyman
- Children: 1
- Awards: Pew Award, (1989) Beckman Young Investigators Award (1991) Maria Sibylla Merian Award, Germany (1998) Merck Prize (European Thyroid Association), Poland (2001) Rose Pitt-Rivers Lecturer at the British Endocrine Society Meeting, Glasgow (2003) Coleman Fellow in Life Sciences, Ben-Gurion University, Israel (2008) Marshall S. Horwitz Faculty Prize for Research Excellence (2009) Light of Life Award (2010) Member of the National Academy of Sciences (2015) Sidney H. Ingbar Distinguished Lecturer, American Thyroid Association (2016) Plenary Lecturer, 1st International Meeting on Science, Health, and Gender, Mexico (2018) Member of the National Academy of Medicine (2020)
- Scientific career
- Fields: Molecular physiology Biochemistry Biophysics Cell physiology
- Workplaces: Vanderbilt University; Yale University; Albert Einstein College of Medicine

Nancy Carrasco is a professor in, and the chair of, the Department of Molecular Physiology and Biophysics at Vanderbilt University. Carrasco has conducted research in the fields of biochemistry, biophysics, molecular physiology, molecular endocrinology, and cancer. She cloned the sodium/iodide symporter (NIS), a breakthrough in thyroid pathophysiology with ramifications for many other fields, including structure/function of transport proteins, molecular endocrinology, gene transfer studies, cancer, and public health (she has served on the Environmental Protection Agency's science advisory board).

== Early life and education ==
Carrasco was born in Mexico City, Mexico. She obtained her M.D. from the School of Medicine and her M.S. in Biochemistry from the School of Chemistry at the National Autonomous University of Mexico in 1980 and 1981, respectively. She subsequently became a postdoctoral fellow at the Roche Institute of Molecular Biology in New Jersey, for which she received a Fogarty International Fellowship from the National Institutes of Health. She did her postdoctoral training in the laboratory of Ronald Kaback. In the course of her postdoctoral work, Carrasco—among other things—generated monoclonal and site-directed polyclonal antibodies against the lactose permease of E. coli. She used these antibodies to determine the topology of the lactose permease in the membrane of E. coli, and identified the proton translocation pathway that provides the driving force for lactose accumulation by E. coli.

== Career ==
In 1987, Carrasco joined the faculty of the Albert Einstein College of Medicine, and in 2011 she moved to the Yale School of Medicine. At Yale, in 2018, Carrasco became the C.N.H. Long Professor of Physiology.

In the summer of 2019, Carrasco moved again, this time to Vanderbilt University, where she became the chair of the Department of Molecular Physiology and Biophysics.

She is a member of the Editorial Board for PNAS.

=== Sodium/iodide symporter ===
Carrasco's research group was the first to clone, and extensively characterize at the molecular level, the sodium/iodide symporter (NIS), the key plasma membrane protein that mediates the active transport of iodide into the thyroid, the lactating breast, and other tissues. Carrasco's group has obtained a great deal of mechanistic information on NIS by determining the molecular requirements of this protein at amino acid positions at which mutations have been found in patients. Her group also discovered that, although NIS transports iodide but not chloride (unlike chloride transporters and channels, which transport both), NIS also transports other anions, including the environmental pollutant perchlorate. In addition, her group recently identified an allosteric site in NIS—which, when occupied by an oxyanion such as perchlorate, completely changes the mechanism by which NIS transports iodide. This finding indicates that perchlorate pollution may well be more dangerous to human health than previously thought.

The Carrasco group's NIS knockout mouse has made it possible to generate an animal model of hypothyroidism without the need to use any drugs (e.g., methimazole or propylthiouracil). This animal model has proven to be an extremely valuable tool for investigating the cross-talk between different tissues regulated by the thyroid hormones.

== Personal life ==
Nancy Carrasco is married to Samuel Zyman, a composer with a degree in medicine from the National Autonomous University of Mexico and a doctorate in music composition from the Juilliard School who is now a faculty member at the Juilliard School and at the Blair School of Music at Vanderbilt University. Carrasco and Zyman met on their first day of medical school. They have a son, Erik Zyman, a theoretical syntactician who is a faculty member at the University of Chicago.

== Awards ==
- Pew Award (1989)
- Beckman Young Investigators Award, Beckman Foundation (1991)
- Maria Sibylla Merian Award (1998)
- Marshall S. Horwitz Faculty Prize for Research Excellence (2009)
- Light of Life Award, Light of Life Foundation (2010)
- Member of the National Academy of Sciences (2015)
- Sidney H. Ingbar Distinguished Lecturer, American Thyroid Association (2016)
- Member of the National Academy of Medicine (2020)

The Pew Award is given based on biomedical research. The Beckman Young Investigators Award is given to young members in the early stages of their careers in chemical and life sciences, providing them with research support. Carrasco was the first person to be awarded the Maria Sibylla Merian Award, given by the Essen College of Gender Studies in 1998. The Light of Life Award is given by the Light of Life Foundation to research that has impacted the understanding of Thyroid cancers. The Sidney H. Ingbar Distinguished Lecturer award is given to individuals who have provided major contributions to the research on thyroid.

Additionally, she serves on the editorial board of The Journal of General Physiology, and has served as the president of the Society of Latin American Biophysicists.
