= Faculty of Medicine, National Autonomous University of Mexico =

Medical school of the National Autonomous University of Mexico

Coordinates: 19.3331°N 99.1801°W

Faculty of Medicine of UNAM
- Seal of the UNAM's School of Medicine
- Type: Faculty
- Established: 1553
- Dean: Germán Fajardo Dolci, MD
- Undergraduates: 8,205
- Postgraduates: ~10,000
- Location: Mexico City, Mexico
- Colors: Blue and gold

Faculty of Medicine of UNAM (Spanish: Facultad de Medicina de la UNAM) is the medical school of the National Autonomous University of Mexico (UNAM), located at the main campus of Ciudad Universitaria. Established in 1553 as part of the Royal and Pontifical University of Mexico, it is one of the oldest medical schools in the Americas. The school has undergraduate and graduate studies departments.

It does joint teaching with some other schools, e.g., the School of Science. It also has many grants involving UNAM's Engineering School, in areas such as smart and connected health. It is one of the most recognized schools in the university and in Mexico. The latest three rectors of the university, including the current one, are former deans from this school.

== History ==
The origin of the School of Medicine of the National Autonomous University of Mexico (Universidad Nacional Autónoma de México, known by the acronym UNAM) dates back to the 16th century, with the foundation of the Royal and Pontifical Mexico University (Spanish: Real y Pontificia Universidad de México). In fact, the first decree that authorizes their creation was promulgated by Philip II in 1547 and endorsed in 1551. Nevertheless, the compliance of procedures and the liberation of the corresponding funds postponed the start of their activities until January 1553. By some years, in the area of the medicine, the university was limited to offer incorporation of degrees of other universities that needed it.

The first degree of doctor in medicine was offered August 10, 1553 to Juan Blanco Alcázar.

The first course of medicine given in The Royal and Pontifical Mexico University initiated its activities January 7, 1579.

The program of studies was adjusted to the one used in the University of Salamanca, just like the remainder of the regulatory activities of The Royal and Pontifical Mexico University. Such program consisted of four years of studies. Subsequently, the students carried out a practice of two years next to a recognized doctor and only after finishing this requirement they would be able to opt for the degrees of licentiate, master and doctor.

In the middle of the 16th century a theoretical-practical model was imposed that included the dissection in corpse.

Following the closing of the university by Valentín Gómez Farías in 1883 the school survived in the form of several departments in charge of teaching medicine. Graduating in 1887 the first female doctor Matilde Montoya. It existed that way until 1902 when the university was reopened by Justo Sierra. The School open the door to graduate studies in 1960.

== Staff and organization ==
The school is run by the dean, currently Germán Fajardo Dolci. The school is divided into departments, each with a head who reports to the school dean. The secretary of medical education also has several departments which are responsible for one or more subjects.

- Department of Anatomy: responsible for the anatomy courses.
- Department of Embryology: responsible for the embryology and clinical genetics courses.
- Department of Cell and Histological Biology: responsible for the Histology course.
- Department of Biochemistry: responsible for the Biochemistry and Immunology courses.
- Department of Public Health: responsible for the Public Health courses.
- Department of Pharmacology: responsible for the Pharmacology courses.
- Department of Physiology: responsible for the Physiology courses.
- Department of Surgery: responsible for the Surgery courses.
- Department of Microbiology and Parasitology: responsible for the Microbiology and Parasitology courses.
- Department of Biomedical Informatics: responsible for the Biomedical Informatics courses.
- Department of Amphitheater: responsible of the postgraduate surgery courses and investigation on corpses.

== Location & Facilities ==
The School is located in Ciudad Universitaria in Mexico City, near the School of Chemistry and the School of Odontology.

It consists of one main complex, divided into seven buildings, built when University City was opened. The School also has annexes at several hospitals in Mexico City's metropolitan area, most notably an annex at the General Hospital of Mexico, where the Department of Experimental Medicine is located.

It has one main library and several others used mostly for postgraduate studies.

== Graduate Studies ==
It holds the Graduate program in medicine (MD) called "Titulo de Medico Cirujano" (Physician-Surgeon Diploma).

== Importance ==
In Mexico, the School of Medicine UNAM is generally regarded as one of the most important, if not the most important of the country; it has several links with hospitals and communities, and its students are usually in communities for their social service.

The school also is in charge of the National Exam of Medical Residencies (ENARM), which means that if any MD in Mexico wants to apply for a residency, they should apply to this school, it is regarded to be very hard, and students some times take a full year of study in order to pass it. Approximately 22,000 students present the exam and only 4,000 pass it every year.

The school has two Howard Hughes Medical Institute Scholars and endowment from the NIH extramural research program.

== Alumni ==
=== Rectors of the National Autonomous University of Mexico ===
- Enrique Graue Wiechers, (2015 - to date)
- José Narro Robles (2007 - 2015)
- Juan Ramón de la Fuente (1999 - 2007)
- Octavio Rivero Serrano (1981 - 1984)
- Guillermo Soberón Acevedo (1973 - 1981)
- Ignacio Chávez Sánchez (1961 - 1966)
- Salvador Zubirán Anchondo (1946 -1948)

=== Prominent physicians ===
- Carlos Fernández del Castillo, M.D. (pancreatic diseases, pancreatobiliary surgery, gastrointestinal surgery) (Massachusetts General Hospital, USA)
- Manuel Isaías López, child and adolescent psychiatrist, founder of AMPI (Asociación Mexicana de Psiquiatría Infantil), Numerary Member of the Academia Mexicana de Pediatría, Secretary General of Consejo Mexicano de Psiquiatría.
- Nora Volkow, psychiatrist and the Director of the National Institute on Drug Abuse (NIDA) at the National Institutes of Health.
- Guillermo Soberón Acevedo, biochemist and a member of El Colegio Nacional.
- Ruy Pérez Tamayo, pathologist and a member of El Colegio Nacional and the Academia Mexicana de la Lengua.
- Antonio Peña Díaz, biochemist founder of the Institute of Cellular Physiology.
- Daniel Velazquez Villanueva, OB-GYN.
- Fernando Ortiz Monasterio, Plastic Surgeon.
- Gerardo Gamba Ayala, Nephrologist, National Prize for Arts and Sciences (Mexico) 2010 .
- Adam M Sonabend Worthalter, Neurosurgeon.
- Alan Zajarias Rabchinskey, Interventional Cardiology.
- Oscar G. Arrieta Rodriguez, Thoracic Oncology.
