= Matilde Montoya =

First female physician in Mexico

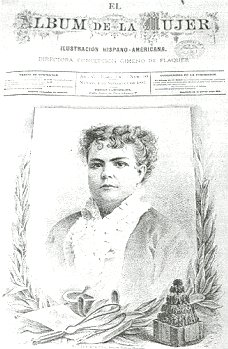
Matilde Montoya, c. 1925

Matilde Petra Montoya Lafragua (b. Mexico City, March 14, 1859 – d. Mexico City, January 26, 1939) was the first female physician in Mexico. Initially working as a midwife, she became one of the first women to attend and graduate Medical School, eventually earning her doctorate in 1887. Later she was a surgeon and obstetrician. Montoya played an important role in the social establishment of women's rights and the movements toward unbiased opportunities for education and occupations for women.

== Biography ==
Matilde Montoya was the second daughter of Soledad Lafragua and José María Montoya; however, she was educated as though she were an only child, due to the death of her sister. From a very early age, Matilde began to show interest in studying, thanks to the support and the lessons that her mother gave her. She completed her primary education at the age of 12, but was much too young to enter higher education. She was encouraged by her family (though mostly by her mother), to study gynecology and obstetrics. Her family, particularly her mother, supported her decision to pursue a career in obstetrics and gynecology. Matilde enrolled in the School for Obstetrics and Midwifery following the loss of her father. She worked at the San Andrés hospital and the school was associated with the National School of Medicine. Later on, her family's financial difficulties forced her to give up on this career. She then made the decision to enroll at the House of Maternity's School of Midwives and Obstetrics, which is located in the streets of Revillagigedo.

== Medical education ==
At the age of 16, Montoya received the title of midwife, mostly practicing in Puebla, until she was 18 years old. She worked, in her beginnings, as an auxiliary of surgery under the tutelage of doctors Luis Muñoz and Manuel Soriano. Some doctors led a campaign against her, calling her a Freemason and Protestant. In Puebla, she applied to the School of Medicine, presenting her thesis of her professional record. She fulfilled the requisites for chemistry, physics, zoology, and botany, with which she passed the entrance exam. In 1882, she was accepted into the School of Medicine in Mexico City. Matilde Montoya graduated from the obstetrics program at the School of Medicine having passed her examinations in the fields of medicine, surgery and obstetrics.

When she received her M.D. degree from the Escuela de Medicina de México in 1887, today Facultad de Medicina (College of Medicine) of the National Autonomous University of Mexico, President Diaz and his wife appeared in person to congratulate her. The Secretario de Gobernación (Secretary of the Interior) declared her doctor of surgery and obstetrics. Matilde Montoya became Mexico's first certified female doctor. Although, people tried to challenge the accreditation of her studies at the National Faculty of Medicine despite her exceptional grades. As a woman, Montoya faced prejudice upon entering the medical profession that went against social norms. It caused a range of responses from the public at the time, from those who acknowledged and celebrated her work and saw it as a starting point for changing the status of women in society to those who questioned the reliability of their efforts, claiming that it was not "natural" for a woman to have a career that did not align with her sex. However, Montoya's achievements were an accomplishment for women as an effort to increase their participation in the traditionally male-dominated field of medicine.

== Recognition ==
Maltide Petra Montoya Lafragua was a distinguished medical professional in the areas of gynecology, obstetrics, and pediatrics. In response to criticism from her detractors, José de la Cruz Porfirio Díaz Mori, the President of Mexico at the time, recognized Montoya's ability and showed his support by granting her a scholarship. Porfirio Diaz was an advocate for allowing middle and upper-class women a fundamental education as an opportunity to advance in medicine.

== Legacy ==
Montoya was an important leader and member of numerous women’s organizations, along with other female medical pioneers. She belonged to a group of at least 27 female doctors who were a part of 42 different formed feminist associations. These activist organizations emerged within the start of twentieth century, which was a prominent time period for the social movement of feminism in Mexico. The movement would continue to gain momentum after the 1990s which marked a key shift in Mexican politics. The consolidation of these national communities of physicians demonstrated the critical demand of equal rights for women. Matilde Montoya is an example of tenacity in the pursuit of what for some was a ridiculous dream. She opened the way to science for Mexican women at the end of the last century.
