= National Biodiversity Pavilion =

Biology museum in Mexico City

- Pabellón Nacional de la Biodiversidad
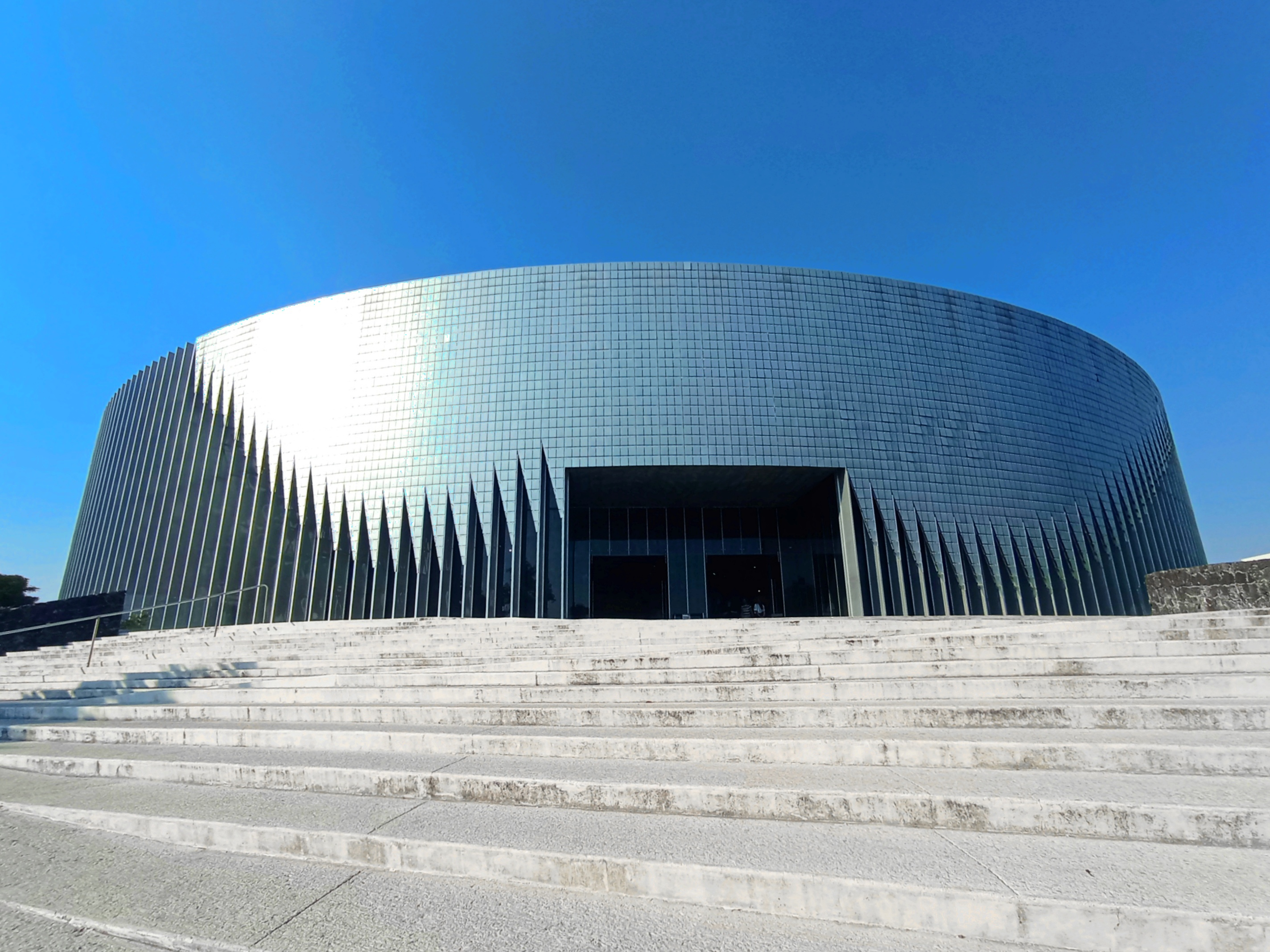
- Established: 2021
- Location: Mexico City
- Coordinates: 19°18′36″N 99°10′48″W
- Website: Official website

The National Biodiversity Pavilion (in Spanish Pabellón Nacional de la Biodiversidad of the National Autonomous University of Mexico) is a Mexico's museum oriented towards showing the national biodiversity in Mexico. It was opened in 2021 at the Ciudad Universitaria in Mexico City.

It is located alongside multiple museums and concerts halls in the Centro Cultural Universitario.

== Institution ==
Opened in 2021, with the sponsorship of Carlos Slim, the museum hosts a number of permanent exhibits which consist mostly on samples of local flora and fauna from Mexico.

It has 12,000 square meters of construction, and the whole design is a combination of architectural designs inspired by biology and elements of nature.

== Services and events ==
It currently has many courses to teach youngsters and elders on how to program and develop digital proficiencies.
