= School of Chemistry, UNAM =

Coordinates: 19.3319°N 99.1819°W

School of Chemistry
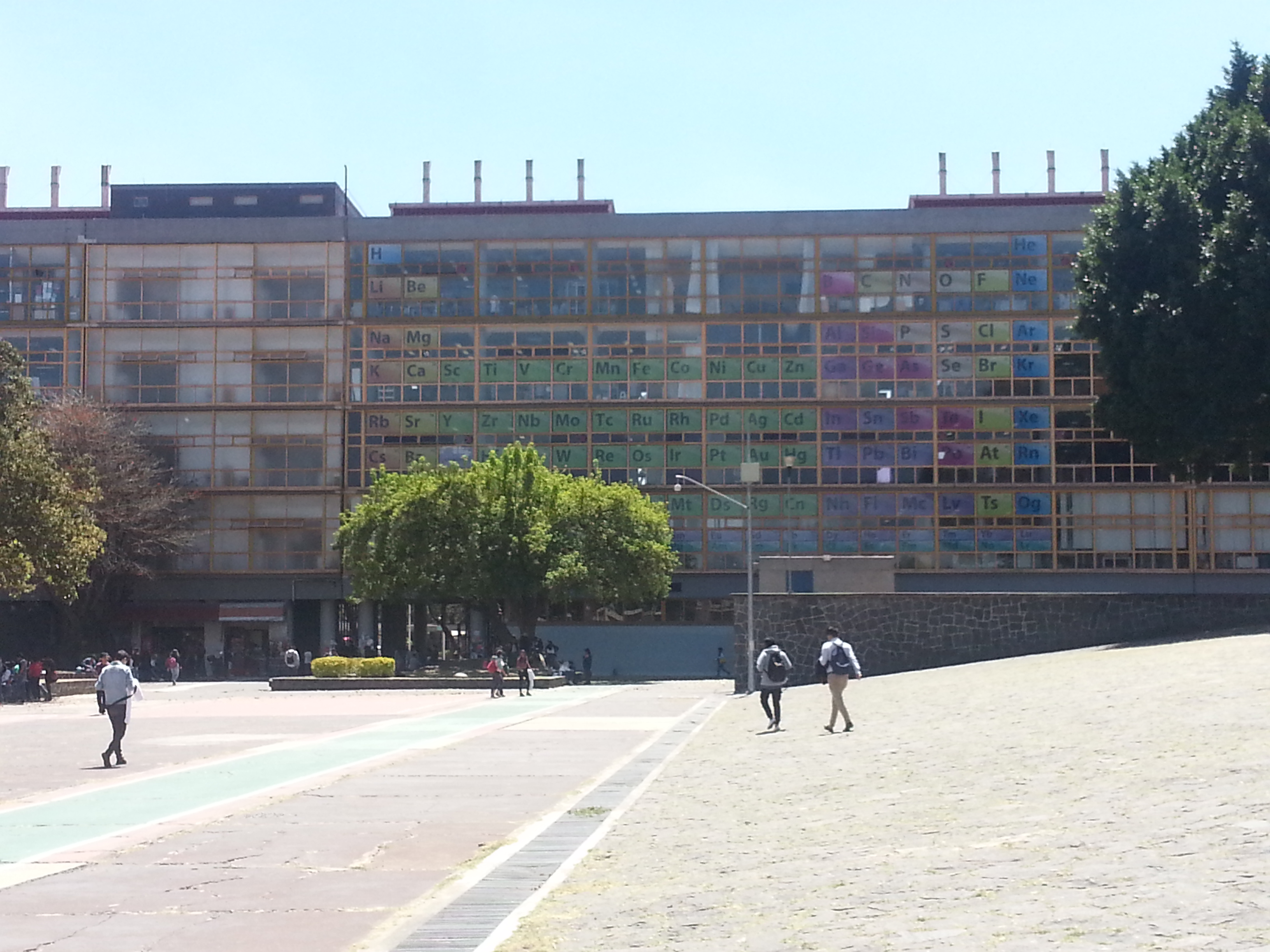
- Main building
- Type: Public
- Established: September 23, 1916
- Director: Dr. Carlos Amador Bedolla
- Academic staff: 1,274 (2013)
- Students: 8,893 (2014).
- Undergraduates: 6,863 (2014)
- Postgraduates: 2,030 (2014).
- Address: Circuito Interior, Ciudad Universitaria, Colonia Copilco Coyoacán, C.P. 04510 Delegación Coyoacán., Mexico City, Mexico
- Campus: Ciudad Universitaria. Conjunto externo de Tacuba, San Álvaro, Tacuba
- Website: www.quimica.unam.mx

The School of Chemistry is one of the 27 academic institutions that are part of the National Autonomous University of Mexico (UNAM). The School carries out research activities in the fields of biochemistry, analytical chemistry, organic chemistry, physical chemistry, food chemistry, biotechnology, metallurgy, chemical engineering, pharmacy, inorganic chemistry, nuclear chemistry, theoretical chemistry and theoretical physics. The School is organized into 12 scientific departments and 4 units.

The School of chemistry also offers six 4.5-year undergraduate degrees:

- Chemical engineering
- Metallurgical chemical engineering
- Chemistry
- Pharmaceutical Biological Chemistry
- Food chemistry
- Chemistry and engineering in materials

Most of the School's buildings are located in the main campus of UNAM, Ciudad Universitaria (University City, south Mexico City), while two more external campuses are also part of the School, the External Complex of Tacuba (Conjunto Externo de Tacuba), in Tacuba, west Mexico City, and the Sisal Foreign Station (Estación Foránea de Sisal), in Sisal, Mérida, Yucatan, south-east Mexico.

The institution also offers graduate level studies (Master and Doctorate) in diverse areas:

- Chemical Sciences
- Biochemical Sciences
- Chemical Engineering
- Industrial Management
- Teaching in Chemical Sciences for High School Education
- Material Science and Engineering
- Marine Sciences and Limnology
- Clinical Biochemistry

In addition, the School offers several Lifelong Learning programs as well as a wide range of training certificates.

== History ==
In the early 20th century, the Mexican industry was strongly focused on beer brewing, mining, sugar processing, fabric and textile manufacturing and some pharmaceutical industries. However, the harsh national and international context, derived from the Mexican Revolution movement and World War I affected the availability of highly skilled personnel.

Therefore, in January 1913, Juan Salvador Agraz presented an initiative to the mexican president Francisco I. Madero to create the School of Chemistry. On September 23, 1916, the Mexican president Venustiano Carranza promulgated by government-decree the foundation of the National School of Industrial Chemistry (Escuela Nacional de Química Industrial, and later Escuela Nacional de Ciencias Químicas or National School of Chemical Sciences) in the town of Tacuba (north-west to Mexico City). In February 1917, the school was incorporated to the National University of Mexico (currently UNAM). In 1919, the school incorporated the degree of pharmacy to its curricula, which was until then provided by the National School of Medicine. Soon, the school established the Laboratory of Analysis and the Laboratory of Preparative Organic and Inorganic Chemistry. In a similar manner, the school installed an ether production plant and created new buildings for fermentative, sugar and starch processing, tannery chemicals and pharmaceutical industries. The first course on organic chemistry applied to pharmacy was taught initially by Adolfo P. Castañares, who was, after some years, elected as director of the school.

The degree in chemical engineering was later implemented in 1925 by the pioneering engineer Estanislao Ramírez. He studied in the Massachusetts Institute of Technology, where he learned unit operations from their creator, William H. Walker. Estanislao Ramírez was professor of industrial physics since 1922, and 19 years after creating the degree in chemical engineering in the National University of Mexico, he was also founder of the degree of industrial chemical engineering in the National Polytechnic Institute (IPN), in 1944.

In 1965, the National School of Chemical Sciences was awarded the rank of "Faculty", meaning it now had graduate school programs.

== Noted faculty and alumni ==
- Mario J. Molina, Nobel laureate in Chemistry in 1995.
- Luis E. Miramontes, co-inventor of the first oral contraceptives.
- Francisco Gonzalo Bolívar Zapata, Prince of Asturias awardee in 1991, developed molecular biology-based techniques used to produce insulin and somatostatin.
- Jesús Romo Armería, National Prize for Arts and Sciences in 1971, synthetic chemist who first developed an economical method to synthesize the feminine hormones estradiol and progesterone from dioscoreas.
- Alfonso Romo de Vivar, developed an economical technique to obtain steroids using natural products from vegetal resources such as Yucca filifera.
- Benito Bucay Faradji, professor, financier and mathematician.
- Roberto Medellín, academic, dean of UNAM and director of the IPN in the decade of 1930.

== Facilities ==
The School of Chemistry consists of the following buildings:

- Complexes A, B, C and F, in the main area of Ciudad Universitaria campus.
- Complexes D and E, in the south sector of Ciudad Universitaria.
- External Complex of Tacuba, it is placed where the original building of the National School of Chemical Sciences was first established. It is located in Tacuba, in the borough of San Álvaro, north-west Mexico City.
- Sisal Foreign Station, in Sisal, Mérida, Yucatán (south-east Mexico).

== Former Directors ==
- Juan Salvador Agraz (1916–1918)
- Adolfo P. Castañares (1918–1919)
- Francisco Lisci (1919–1920), (1933–1934)
- Roberto Medellín (1920–1921), (1929–1931)
- Julián Sierra (1921–1924)
- Ricardo Caturegli Fontes (1924–1927), (1944 interino)
- Juan Manuel Noriega (1927–1929)
- Rafael Illiescas Fribie (1931–1933), (1947–1956)
- Fernando Orozco Díaz (1934–1941)
- Manuel Dondé Gorozpe (1941–1944)
- Eugenio Álvarez (1944–1947)
- Francisco Díaz Lombardo (1956–1964)
- Manuel Madrazo Garamendi (1964–1970)
- José F. Herrán Arellano (1970–1978)
- Armando Xavier Padilla Olivares (1978–1986)
- Francisco José Barnés de Castro (1986–1993)
- Andoni Garritz Ruiz (1993–1997)
- Enrique Bazúa Rueda (1997–2001)
- Santiago Capella Vizcaíno (2001–2005)
- Eduardo Bárzana García (2005–2011)
- Jorge Manuel Vázquez Ramos (2011–2019)

== Emeriti Professors ==
- Manuel Dondé Gorozpe †
- Fernando Orozco Díaz †
- Rafael Illescas Frisbie †
- Humberto Estrada Ocampo †
- Alberto Urbina del Raso †
- José Giral †
- José Francisco Herrán Arellano †
- Fernando González Vargas †
- Francisco Giral González †
- César Rincón Orta
- Raúl Cetina Rosado †
- Francisco Javier Garfias y Ayala
- Armando Xavier Padilla Olivares †
- Jesús Guzmán García †
- José Luis Mateos Gómez
- Estela Sánchez Quintanar
- Ángela Sotelo López †
- Rodolfo de Santiago Palomares Díaz Ceballos †

== Photo gallery ==
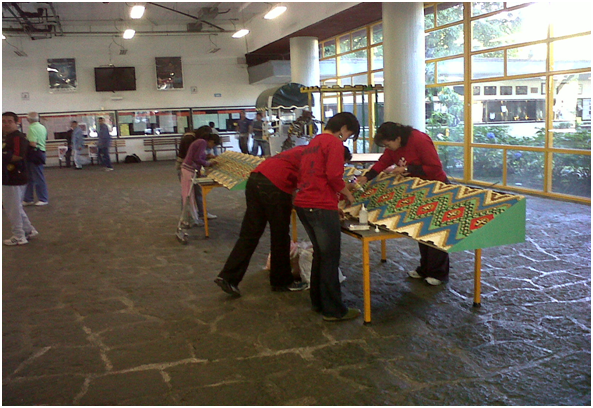
Recreative activities.

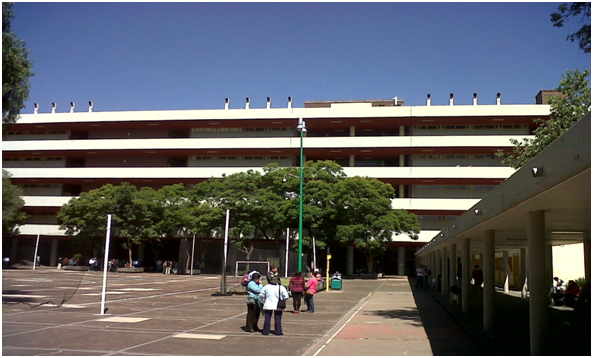
Central courtyard.

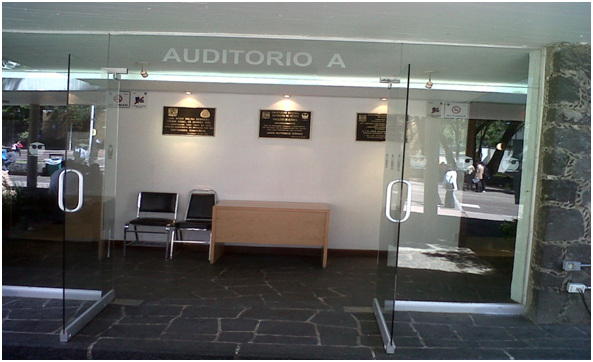
Hall A
