= Enrique Graue Wiechers =

Mexican doctor and UNAM rector (born 1951)

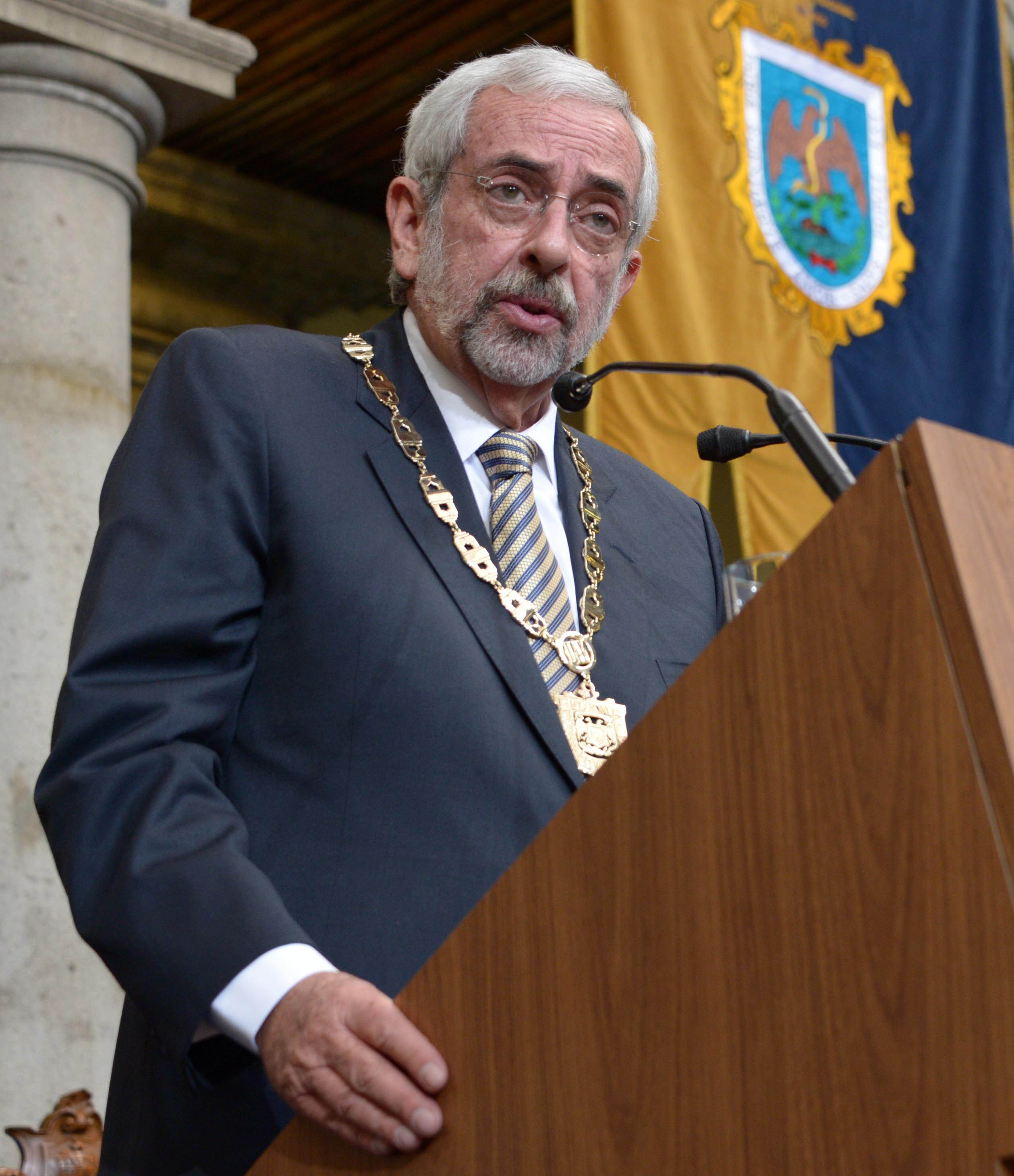

Rector of the National Autonomous University of Mexico
- In office 17 November 2015 – 16 November 2023
- Preceded by: José Narro Robles
- Succeeded by: Leonardo Lomelí Vanegas

Personal details
- Born: Enrique Luis Graue Wiechers; January 9, 1951 (age 75) Mexico City, Mexico
- Spouse: Mercedes Hernández
- Children: 2
- Education: National Autonomous University of Mexico (MD)
- Occupation: Academic

Enrique Luis Graue Wiechers (born January 9, 1951) is a Mexican ophthalmologist and academic who served as rector of the National Autonomous University of Mexico from 2015 to 2023.

== Biography ==
Graue Wiechers entered Preparatory School No. 4 in 1967 and was part of various committees and student groups in the student protests of the late 1960s, including being the student body president of the school in 1969. He graduated from the UNAM Faculty of Medicine in 1975 as a surgical doctor and then in 1978 with a specialty in ophthalmology. He later studied Biology and Surgery of Cornea Transplants at the University of Florida.

Beginning in 1975, Graue Wiechers taught at the Faculty of Medicine. He became the coordinator of the Academic Ophthalmology Committee and then the Chief of the Division of Graduate Studies and Research, a post he occupied from 2004 to 2008. He was named to be dean of the Faculty of Medicine in January 2008 and reelected to the position in 2012.

Graue has served on various committees in his specialty. He was the only Mexican to sit on the Academia Ophthalmologica Internationalis and has been the president of the Mexican Ophthalmology Society (1990), the Mexican Ophthalmology Council (2004–06), and the Pan-American Association of Ophthalmology (2005–07), as well as vice president of the International Ophthalmology Council. He is currently the president of the National Academy of Medicine.

On November 6, 2015, Graue Wiechers was unanimously selected as the next rector of the UNAM. Graue succeeds José Narro Robles, another doctor, who occupied the post from 2007 to 2015. He is the tenth doctor to be rector of UNAM. On November 8, 2019, he was reappointed until 2023.

== Publications ==
Graue wrote the book Oftalmología en la Práctica de la Medicina General (Ophthalmology in the Practice of General Medicine) and has edited three books related to medical education. He has more than 100 publications in the field.

== Personal ==
Graue met his wife during high school in the late 1960s. His son, also named Enrique, is a fourth-generation ophthalmologist.

Since 2002, Graue has been the president of the Patronato de la Fundación Conde de Valenciana IAP, a non-profit organization devoted to ophthalmology. He had previously been the chief of the foundation's cornea department from 1980 to 1990.
