= Francesco Bandarin =

Italian architect, United Nations diplomat

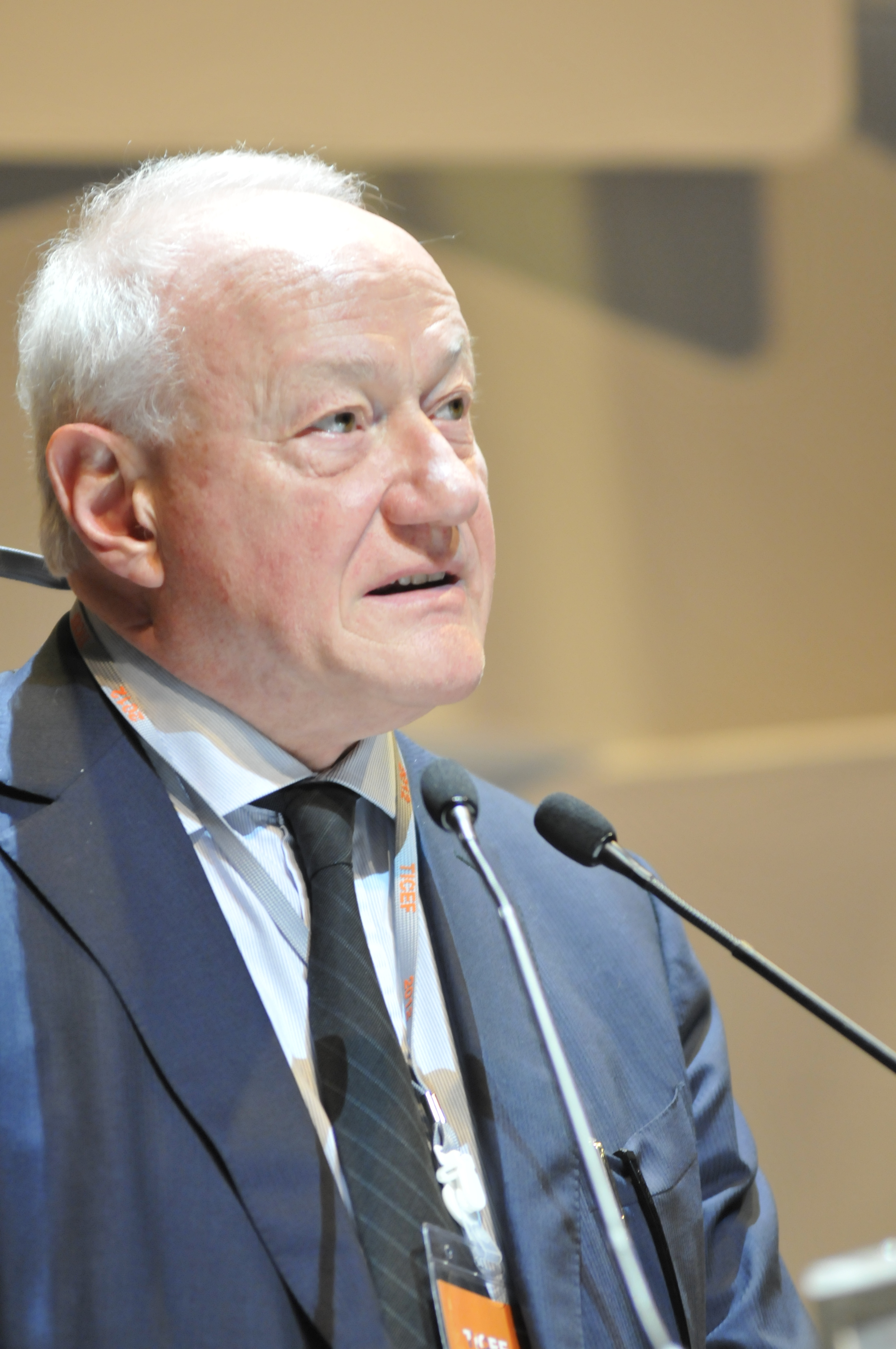

Assistant Director-General of UNESCO for Culture
- In office 31 May 2010 – 28 February 2018
- Preceded by: Françoise Rivière
- Succeeded by: Ernesto Ottone

Director of the World Heritage Centre
- In office 20 September 2000 – 31 May 2010
- Preceded by: Bernd von Droste
- Succeeded by: Kishore Rao

Personal details
- Born: 26 December 1950 (age 75) Venice, Italy
- Education: Università Iuav di Venezia, University of California, Berkeley

Francesco Bandarin (born 26 December 1950) is an Italian architect. He was Director of the UNESCO World Heritage Centre from 2000 to 2010 and then Assistant Director-General of UNESCO for Culture from 2010 to 2018.

== Biography ==
He holds a bachelor's degree in architecture from the Iuav University of Venice and a masters in city planning from the University of California, Berkeley.

As Director of the World Heritage Centre, Francesco Bandarin was responsible for the implementation of the Convention Concerning the Protection of the World Cultural and Natural Heritage and, to that end, coordinated institutional activities relating to the inscription of sites on the World Heritage List.

During that time, the Centre launched a number of thematic programmes (Forests, Religious Interest, Small Island Developing States, Marine, Cities and more) and facilitated the creation of research and training centres in Bahrain, Brazil, China, India, Italy, Mexico and South Africa.

Francesco Bandarin also advocated for the conservation of urban heritage in a broader sense. That approach was enshrined by the Recommendation on the Historic Urban Landscape, adopted by the UNESCO General Conference on 10 November 2011. According to that text, UNESCO considers that, “in order to support the protection of natural and cultural heritage, emphasis needs to be put on the integration of historic urban area conservation, management and planning strategies into local development processes and urban planning, such as, contemporary architecture and infrastructure development, for which the application of a landscape approach would help maintain urban identity”.

During his tenure as Assistant Director-General, the UNESCO Culture Sector spearheaded initiatives which helped to establish culture as a sustainability issue, in and of itself.

This led to the adoption of the Hangzhou Declaration: Placing Culture at the Heart of Sustainable Development Policies on 17 May 2013.

This orientation is also found in the first UNESCO Global Report on Culture for Sustainable Urban Development (“Culture: Urban Future”), released on 18 October 2016 during the Third United Nations Conference on Housing and Sustainable Urban Development (Habitat III).

On 12 December 2017, UNESCO and the World Tourism Organization signed the Muscat Declaration on Tourism and Culture: Fostering Sustainable Development. When properly managed, tourism can be a “means to promote inter-cultural dialogue, create employment opportunities, curb rural migration, and nurture a sense of pride among host communities”.

Francesco Bandarin appears in the media on a regular basis, whenever cultural properties are under threat. He also presents one World Heritage Site each month in Il Giornale dell'Arte.

In 2014, he served as president of the jury of the Venice Biennale of Architecture. In 2019 and 2020, he chaired the world judges panel for the Prix Versailles.

Bandarin is on the advisory council of the Smithsonian Center for Folklife and Cultural Heritage, on the international council for the International Alliance for the Protection of Heritage, and an advisor to the Aga Khan Trust for Culture.

== Main publications ==
- Changing Heritage: How Internal Tensions and External Pressures are Threatening Our Cultural and Natural Legacy, London: Routledge, 2024, ISBN 978-1-032-71393-9.
- The Historic Urban Landscape: Managing Heritage in an Urban Century (with Ron van Oers), Chichester: Wiley, 2012, ISBN 978-0-470-65574-0.
- Reconnecting the City: The Historic Urban Landscape Approach and the Future of Urban Heritage (with Ron van Oers), Chichester: Wiley, 2014, ISBN 978-1-118-38398-8.
- Reshaping Urban Conservation: The Historic Urban Landscape Approach in Action (with Ana Pereira Roders), New York: Springer Publishing, 2019, ISBN 978-981-10-8887-2.

== Distinctions ==
- Grand Officer of the Order of Merit of the Italian Republic (2012)
