= Ciudad Universitaria, Mexico City =

Main campus of the National Autonomous University of Mexico (UNAM) in Mexico City

Ciudad Universitaria
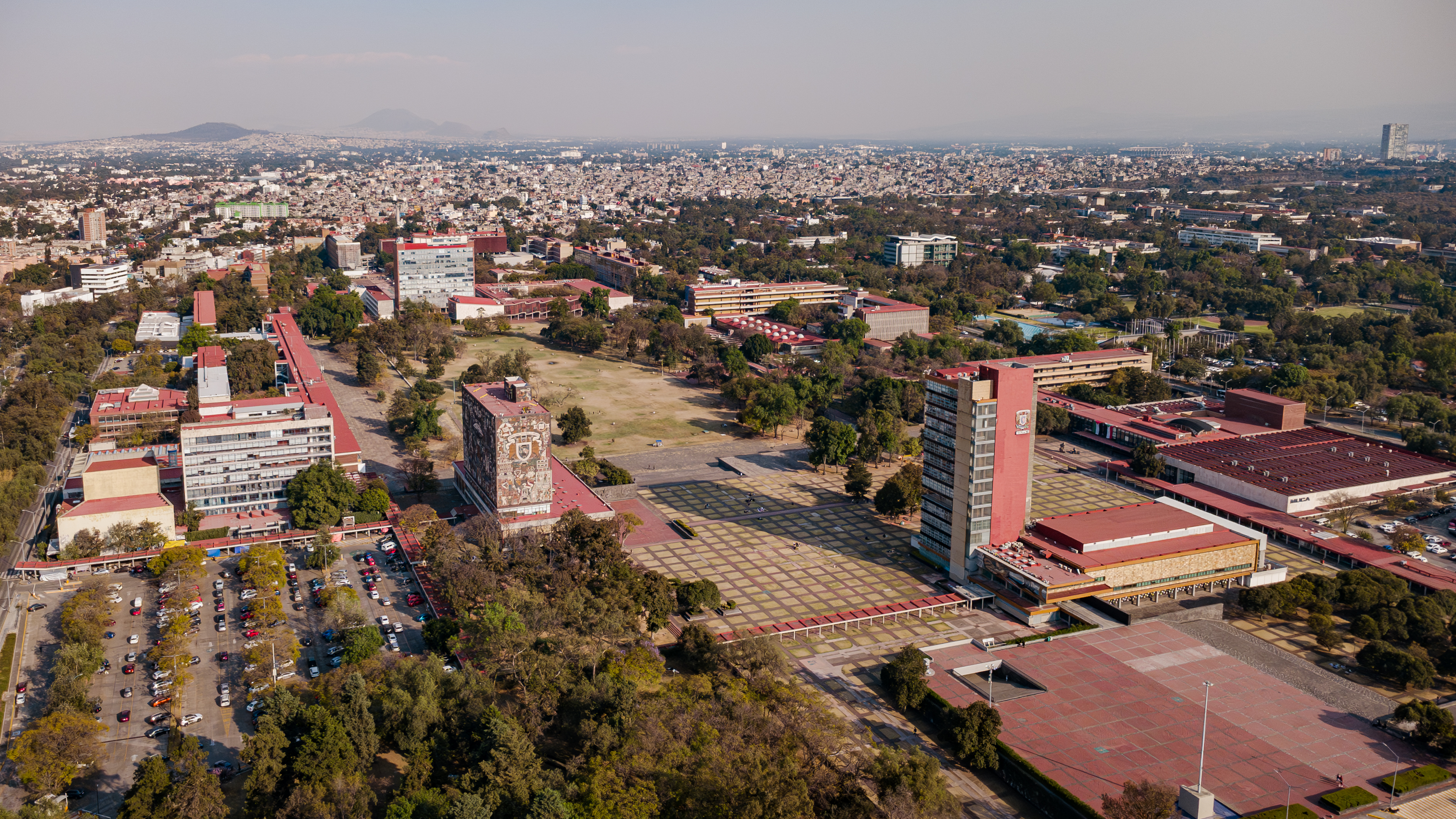
- Main Campus of National Autonomous University of Mexico.
- Parent institution: UNAM
- Students: 116,506 (2019)
- Location: Ciudad Universitaria, Mexico; 19.33309°N 99.18526°W
- Campus: 1.76 km^{2} (0.68 sq mi)

UNESCO World Heritage Site
- Official name: Central University City Campus of the Universidad Nacional Autónoma de México (UNAM)
- Type: Cultural
- Criteria: i, ii, iv
- Designated: 2007 (31st session)
- Reference no.: 1250
- Region: Latin America and the Caribbean

Ciudad Universitaria (University City) is the main campus of the National Autonomous University of Mexico (UNAM), located in Coyoacán borough in the southern part of Mexico City. Designed by architects Mario Pani and Enrique del Moral, it encloses the Olympic Stadium, about 40 faculties and institutes, the Cultural Center, an ecological reserve, the Central Library, the National Library of Mexico and a few museums. It was built during the 1950s on an ancient solidified lava bed in Coyoacán called "El Pedregal" to replace the scattered buildings in downtown Mexico City where classes were given. It was completed in 1954 at a cost of approximately $25 million. It was declared a World Heritage Site by UNESCO in 2007.

Although the University has other buildings in Mexico City (mostly for undergraduate studies and cultural purposes), in other Mexican states and in other countries (such as Canada and the United States), Ciudad Universitaria, known simply as "C.U.", is the prime symbol of the University.

== Atmosphere ==
Ciudad Universitaria is an open place popular on Sundays with families that wish to explore its patios, gardens and footpaths that cover most of its 1,000 hectares (2,500 acres). It was built on a lava layer 6 to 8 metres (20 to 26 ft) thick which was deposited by the Xitle volcano around 100 AD.

Due to its topography and vegetation, there are very few straight roads or paths. Roads tend to be concentric circuits, with buildings located within them. Some can only be reached by a short, 5- to 10-minute walk. Volcanic rock was removed to make room for the buildings, and it was used to make pathways and outer walls. Buildings themselves are made with common materials, concrete and brick being most common, and usually have big windows and gardens, both inside and outside. Most buildings have only two to three floors.

Although different in style, gardens and volcanic rock are a common theme across all buildings with some notable exceptions: the Rectorate Tower and the Central Library. These tall, square-shaped buildings, somewhat isolated from the rest, are adorned by murals made by famous Mexican muralists David Alfaro Siqueiros (Rectorate Tower) and Juan O'Gorman (Central Library).

The latter, recognized as the largest mural in the world, covering all sides of the Library, based on Aztec and Spanish motifs and UNAM's coat of arms, makes the Central Library Ciudad Universitaria's most iconic building.

The Campus Central is the original campus built in 1943. Comprising 200 hectares (490 acres), Insurgentes Avenue cuts across it.

== Sculptural space ==
Inside the ecological reserve stands the Sculptural Space. It is a big round natural solidified lava bed surrounded by many white triangular prisms that seem to radiate from its center, a bit like a sunflower. There are many big and colorful metallic sculptures made by contemporary artists surrounding this area, hence its name.

== Education buildings ==
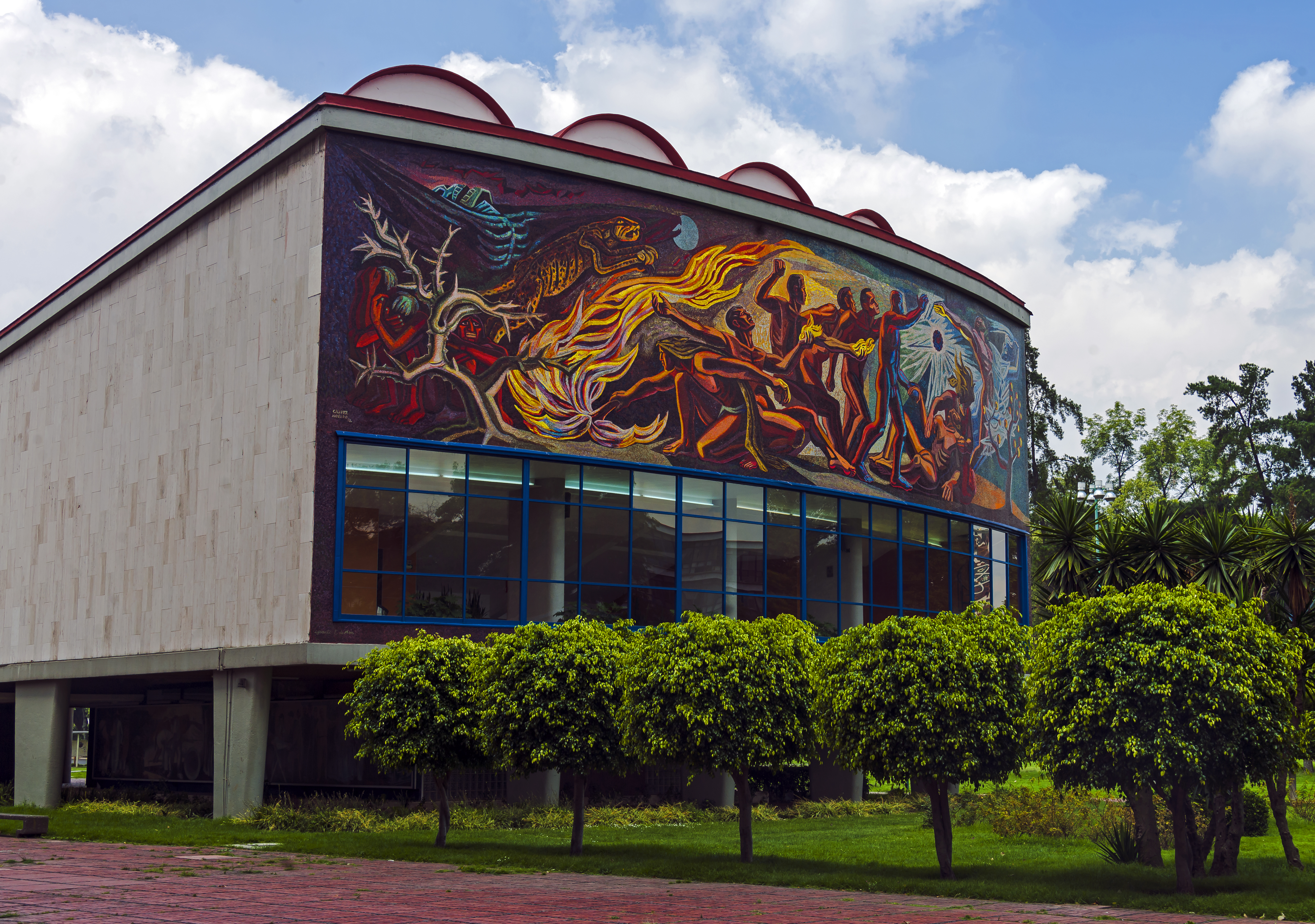
The Conquest of Energy by José Chávez Morado in UNAM, Mexico City.

Vladimir Kaspé and J. Hanhausen designed the economics building, which opened in 1953.

Eugenio Peschard designed the science building; it features a mural by José Chávez Morado entitled The Conquest of Energy.

== Museums ==
- UNIVERSUM, the Science Museum. It houses interactive exhibits about science, geared to the general public.
- University Museum for the Sciences and Arts (MUCA, Museo Universitario de Ciencias y Artes), holds contemporary art exhibits from Mexican artists and works of art property of the University.
- University Museum of Contemporary Art (MUAC, Museo Universitario Arte Contemporáneo).
- National Biodiversity Pavilion (Pabellon Nacional de la Biodiversidad).

== Sports facilities ==
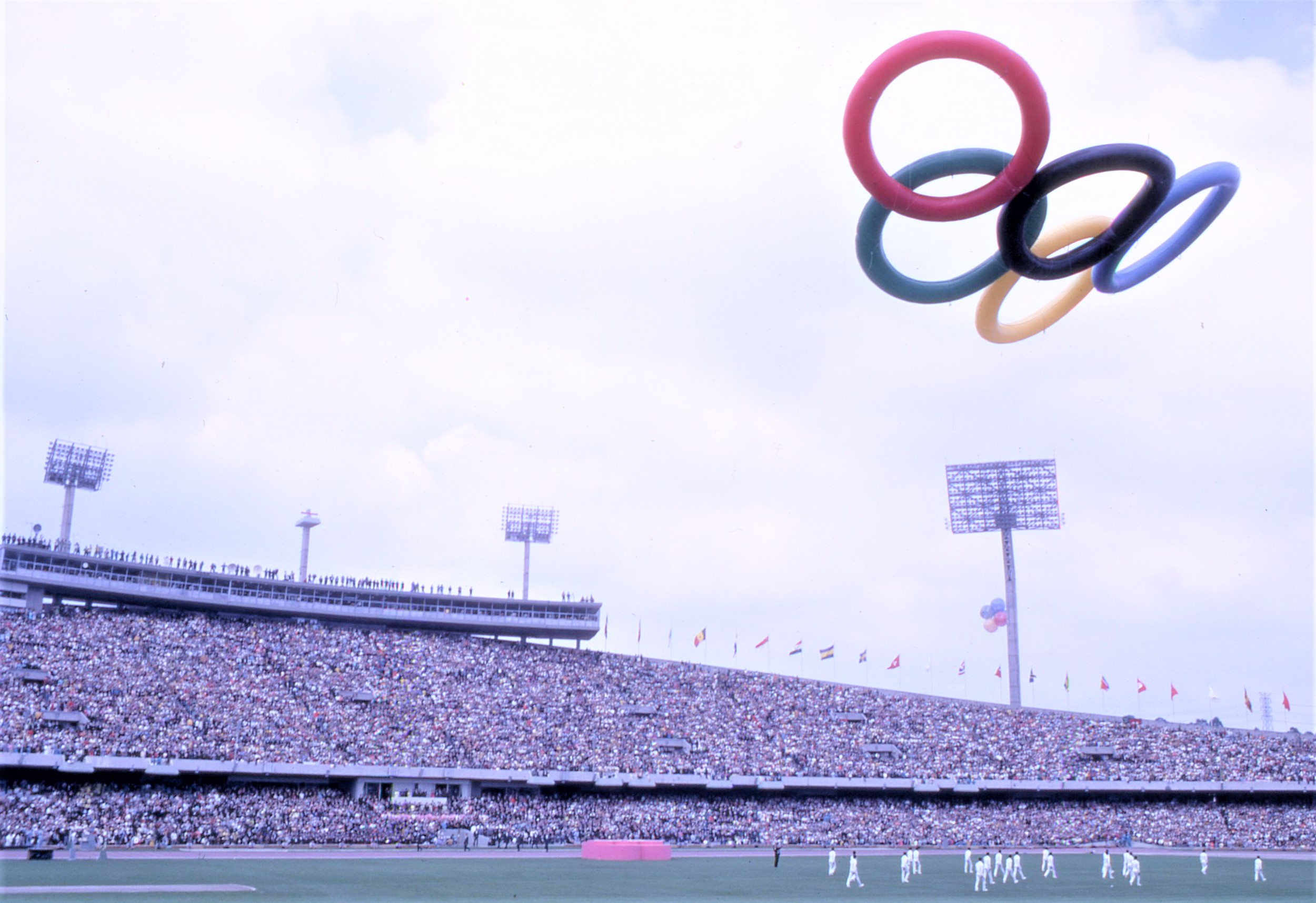
University Olympic Stadium

The Mexico '68 Olympic Stadium was built in 1952 and was used to host the 1955 Pan-American Games and the 1968 Summer Olympic Games in Mexico City. It is located on the Campus Central portion of the city, and its stands were built with excavated lava rock. These stands contain reliefs designed by Diego Rivera. It was also used in the 1986 FIFA World Cup. Now it holds football matches for Mexico's City university league, as well as being the home stadium for the university's team in the Mexican Football League, the "Pumas". It also has a race track, used for international invitation-only athletic competition in recent times due to the success of Mexican athlete Ana Guevara.

One of the most renowned architecture of the Ciudad Universitaria de Mexico is the area of the "Frontones", which consists of a multipurpose building and ten courts for racquetball and handball game.

There are also football pitches for training of student and children teams. Gyms for martial arts, boxing training and other sports are near the stadium, intended mostly for students.

== Culture ==
C.U. is an important part of Mexico City's cultural life. The campus contains many spaces dedicated to cultural activities from Music, Theatre, Cinema, Visual Arts etc. Most faculties have exhibition spaces and auditoriums used for such purposes.

The University Cultural Centre (Centro Cultural Universitario) is a section of the campus containing the main auditoriums, theatres and cinemas. It also includes one of the most recent Contemporary Art Museums in Mexico, the Museo Universitario de Arte Contemporáneo.

The Centre also includes facilities named for notable figures in Mexican history;

- Sala Nezahualcoyotl. Used for orchestral and dance performances.
- Teatro Juan Ruiz de Alarcón. Major theatre. Both classical and contemporary works.
- Foro Sor Juana Inés de la Cruz. Camera theatre. Mainly contemporary plays.
- Centro Universitario de Teatro (CUT). A smaller theatre (about 100 seats) attached to the theatre school.
- Sala José Revueltas and Sala Julio Bracho. Both cinema theatres screen an eclectic selection of Mexican and international films.
- Sala Miguel Covarrubias. A small theatre for dancing.
- Radio UNAM. XEUN 96.1 MHz and 860 kHz in Mexico City; XEYU, short wave 9600 kHz in the 31-meter international band. Musical, cultural, informative and recreational programming.

== World Heritage Site ==
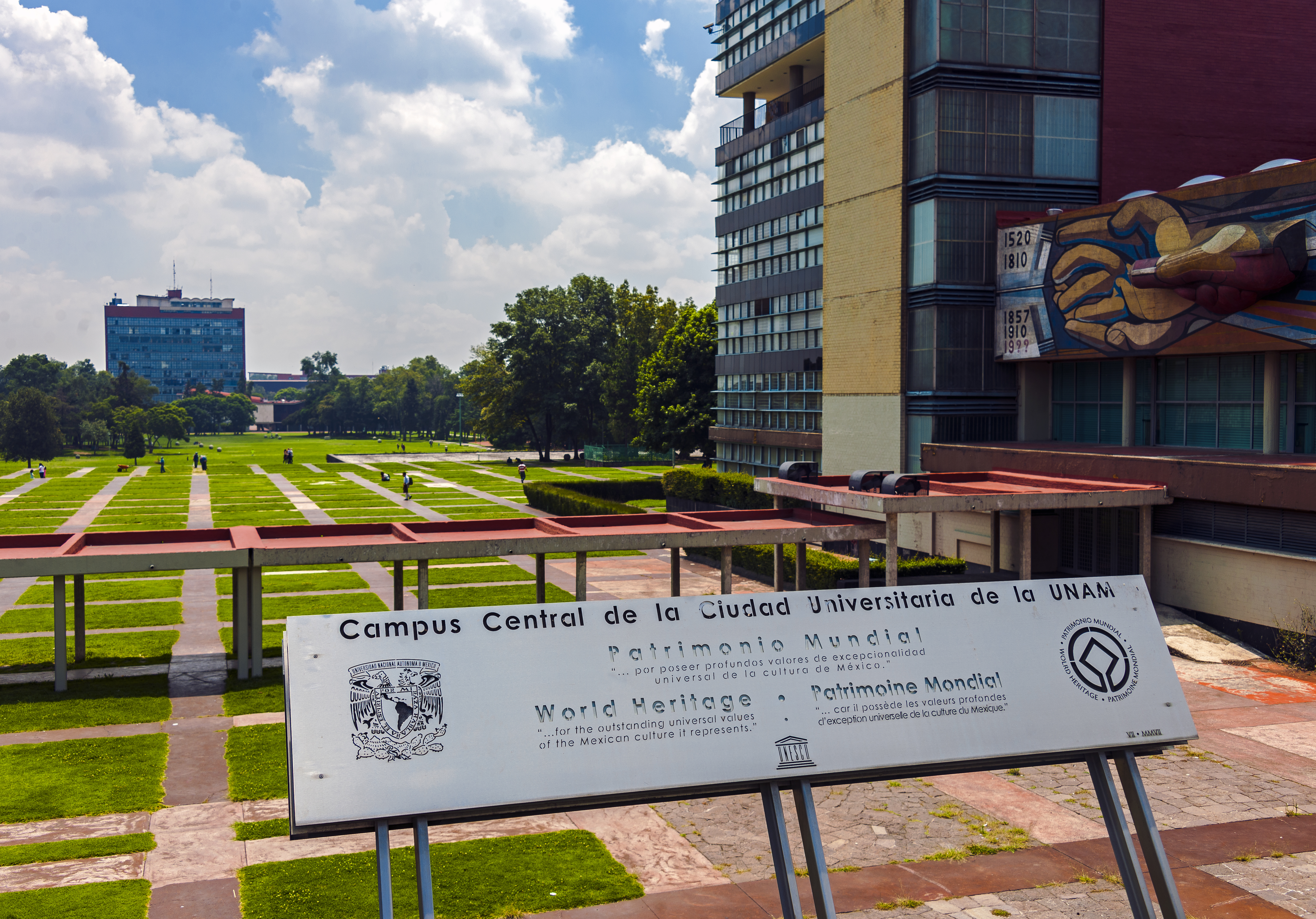
World Heritage Site plaque

Designation as a World Heritage Site began as a visit in 2005 to the campus by Francesco Bandarin who was the Director of the World Heritage Center at the time he recommended it. It was eventually recognized an ingenious example of urban architectural design. It is also noted for its integration of modern architecture, Mexican traditions and artwork, including those by David Alfaro Siqueiros, José Chávez Morado and Francisco Eppens.

== Transportation ==
There is a system named Pumabús. There are eleven main bus routes in Ciudad Universitaria provided by the university itself, through its Internal Transport System. Routes 1 through 5 have their base on the west side of the University, near the metro exit for Metro Universidad station. Three other routes (6,7,8) have their base on parking number 1 of the Olympic stadium. They are free and run from Monday to Friday, from 06:20 until 22:30 hrs. Cars are allowed inside the campus, and there are also taxis taking passengers in groups, following the official bus routes. Some of these routes have long and short versions, a few first and last stops are the same but the long version takes a different route to less visited zones. Additionally, there is a temporary route to take new students to the registration center.

There are three main points of entry to Ciudad Universitaria, two from the metro (Metro Universidad and Metro Copilco stations), and Avenida Insurgentes, running north to south, splitting Ciudad Universitaria in half, where two Metrobús stations provide access to the campus: Ciudad Universitaria and Centro Cultural Universitario. This important avenue is useful to reach other parts of the city, and is near the Olympic Stadium and Cultural Zone.

Lately, a program called "C.U. Limpia" (Clean C.U.) offers 58 bicycle stations around Ciudad Universitaria, these stations contain 200 bicycles each, all of them new, that can be rented by students and returned to any of the other stations around. These have become very popular with students and teachers trying to promote a less polluting mode of transportation.

== Security ==
Despite its size and the lack of entry controls, Ciudad Universitaria is a very safe location for students and visitors alike. There is an internal surveillance group, "Auxilio UNAM" (UNAM Help). They patrol the campus all day, especially on vacation days and weekends. They have no firearms, but have hummers, motorcycles and golf carts. For historical and legal reasons to do with university autonomy, law enforcement officers do not enter Ciudad Universitaria unless specifically requested by the University authorities. Crimes do happen, but are sporadic and usually occur late at night, when most people (both students and employees) have already left. There is also an emergency medical station and a fire station inside campus.

== Shops ==
There are university owned cafeterias around the campus, but they are "franchised" to cooperatives, with the exception of the cafeteria at the Faculty of Sciences (called Café Ciencias) which is run solely by students. These cafeterias are permanent, one floor buildings and very similar to each other. There are also small, permanent shops on the side of some non-schooling buildings, where a full-size cafeteria would be impractical. Some of these shops offer photocopies and office supplies instead of food.

Some semi-permanent shops, selling mostly candies and packaged food, are around the campus. These are built and dismantled every day but are very stable, lasting years in the same place. A few sell University memorabilia, mostly related to the soccer team. Around the campus, but mostly between the Central Library and the Faculty of Philosophy and Literature, one can find people selling crafts as well as music, films and books, some used, some new, but most of them pirated or bootlegged.

Around the metro stations close to the University there are many food shops, but also bookstores, photocopying, photographic studios and the like. Near the northern station, Copilco, just outside Ciudad Universitaria, there are many printing shops running for some blocks, where students get their theses bound.

Near Metro Universidad station, on the fringe of Ciudad Universitaria, there is the "Tienda UNAM" or UNAM Store. It is big supermarket that offers furniture, clothing, food and beverages, vegetables, electronic and computing equipment, toys and many other things. It is run by the University itself. Meant for university employees and their families, it is open to the general public.

== Image gallery ==
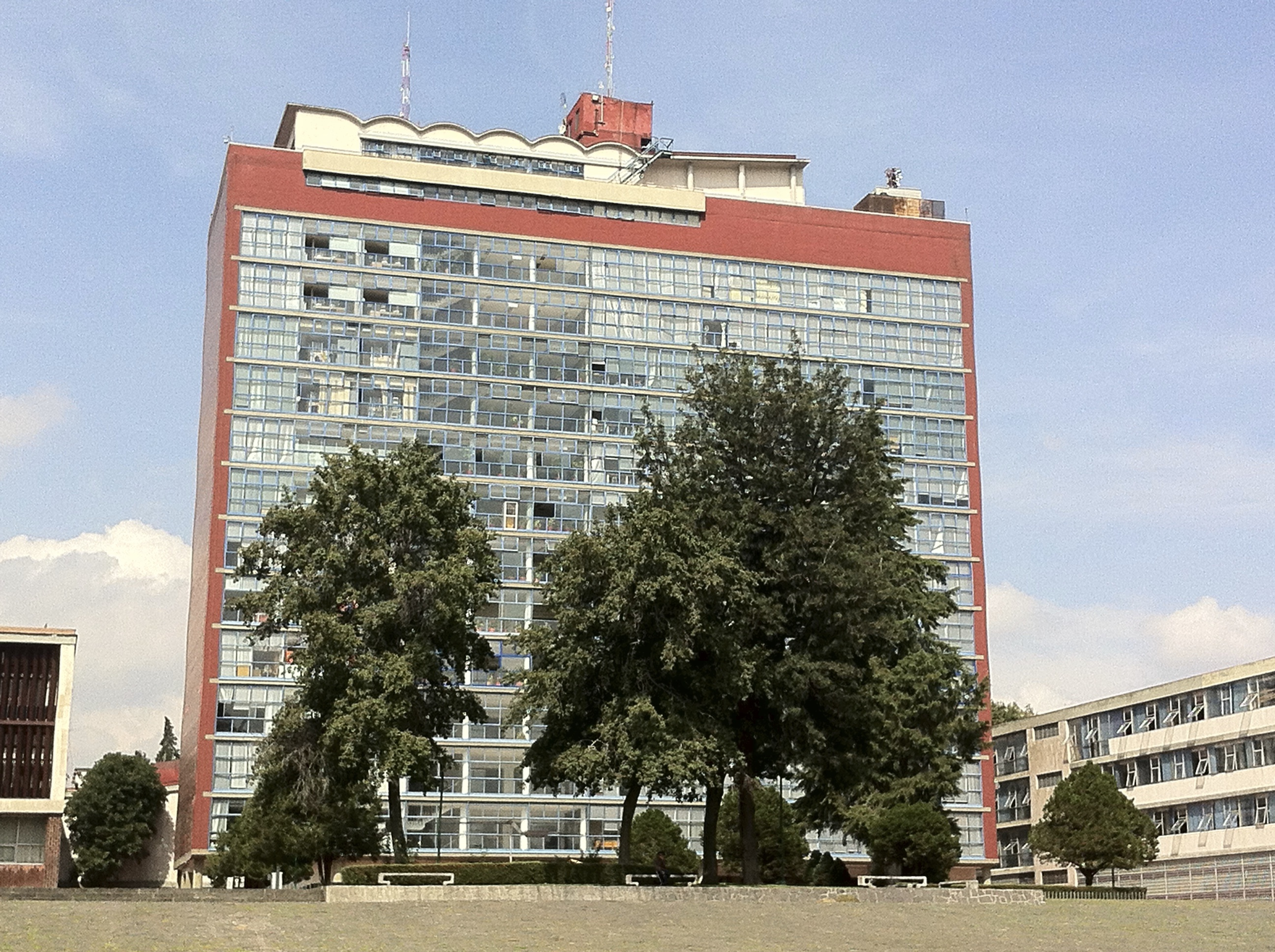
Tower II of Humanities.

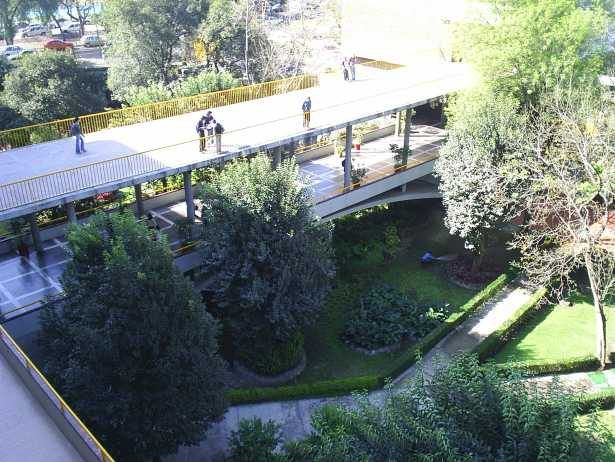
Faculty of Engineering gardens

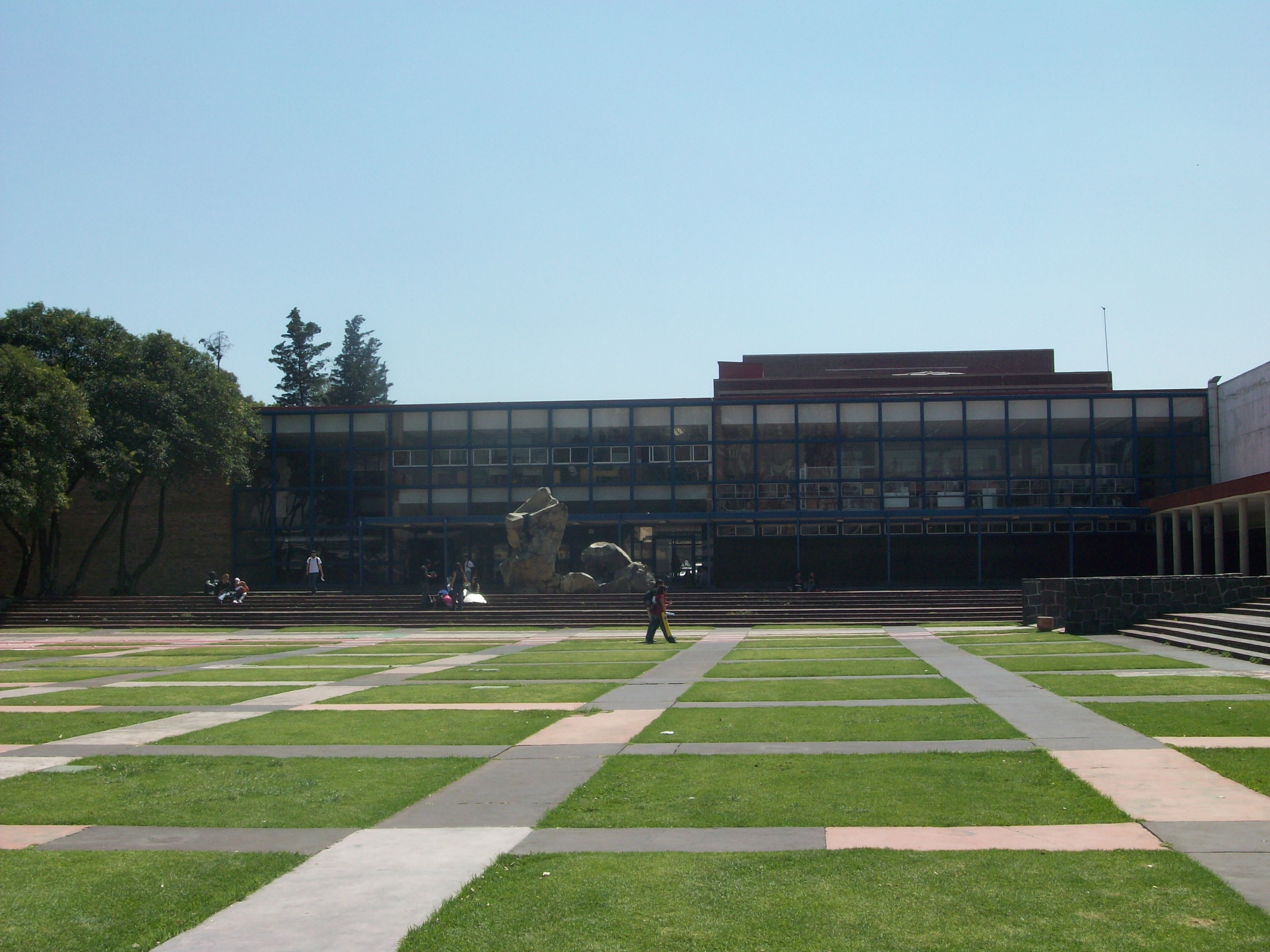
Faculty of Architecture

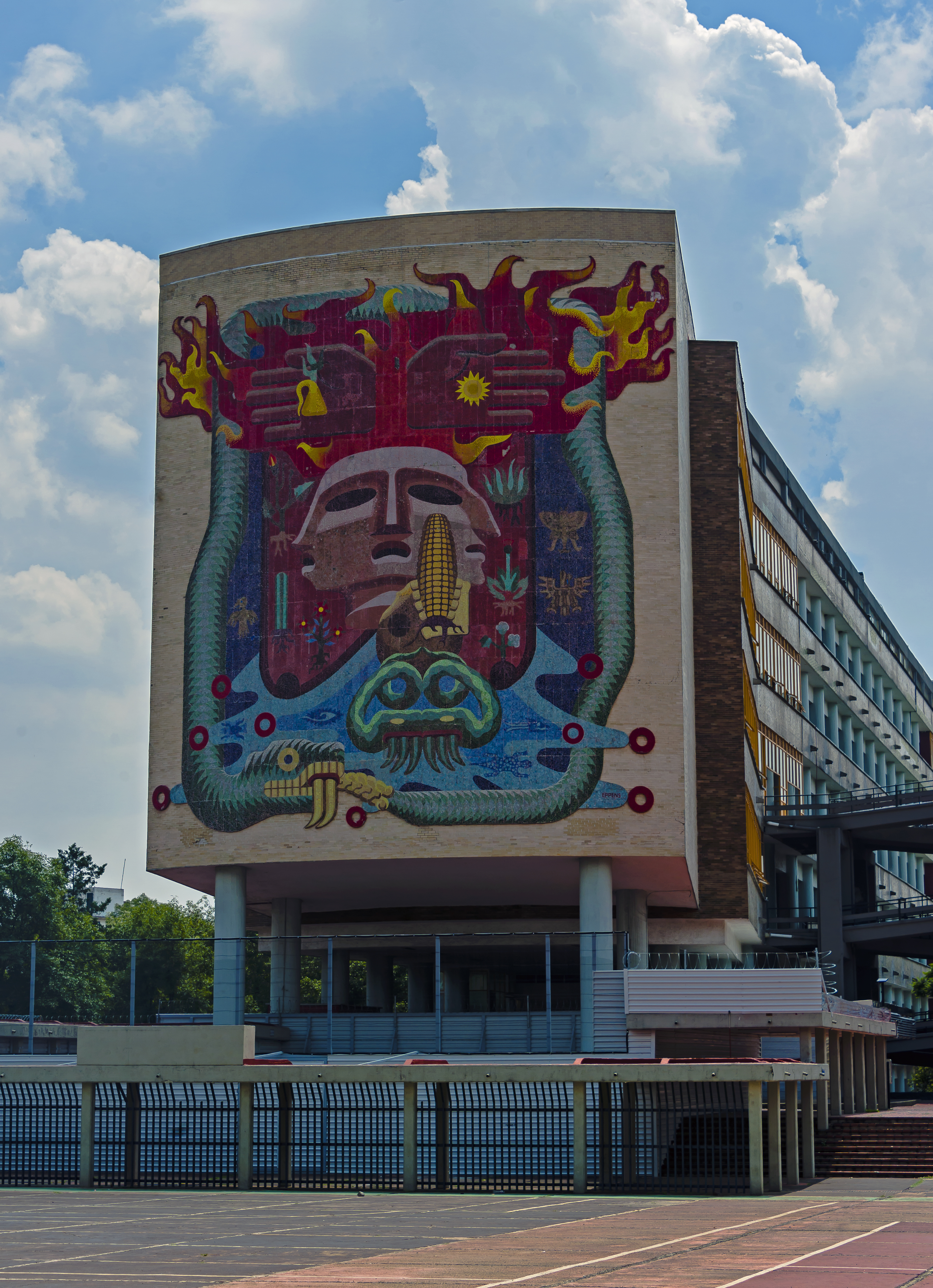
Mural at the School of Medicine.

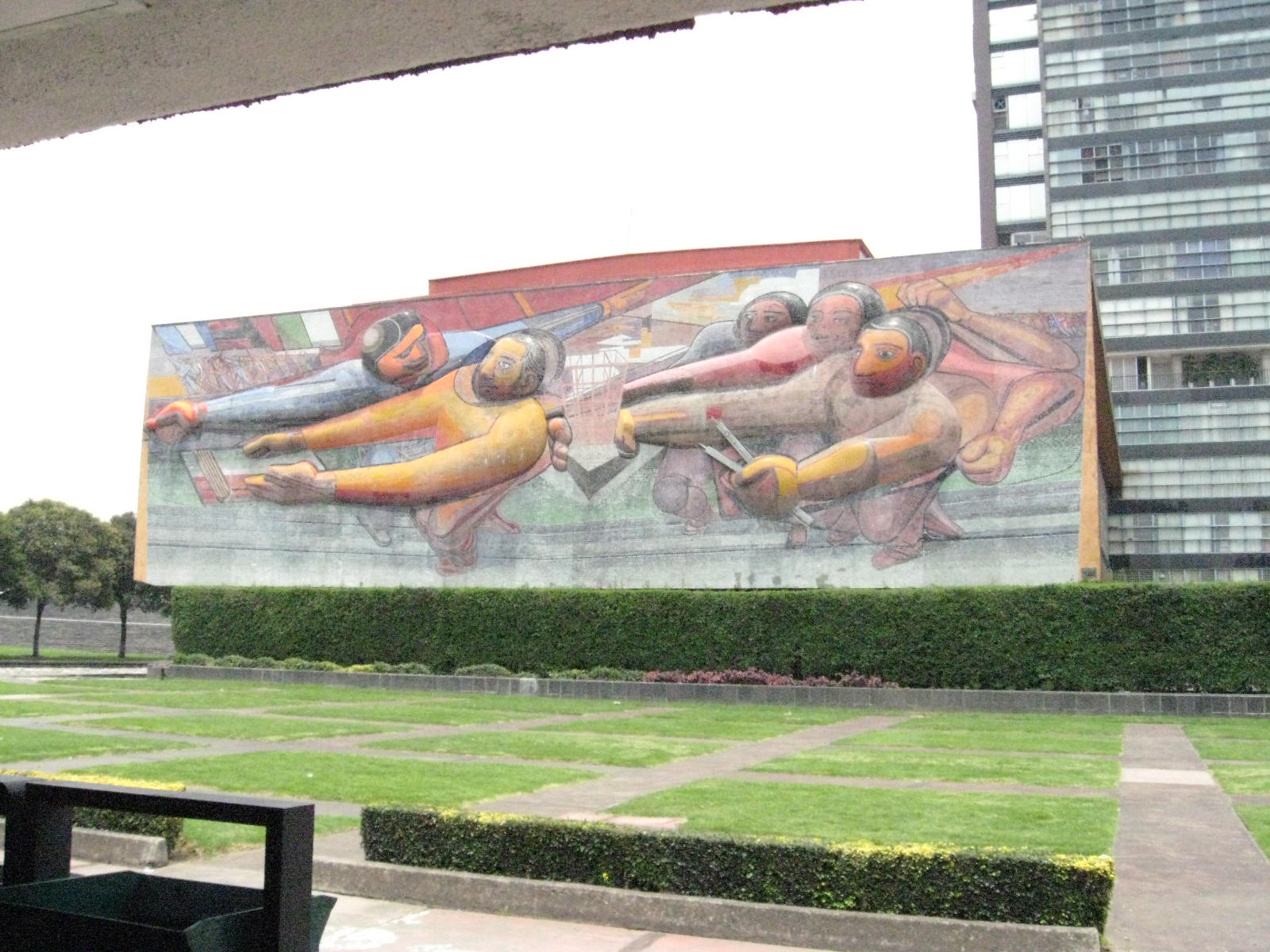
Mural outside of the main administration building

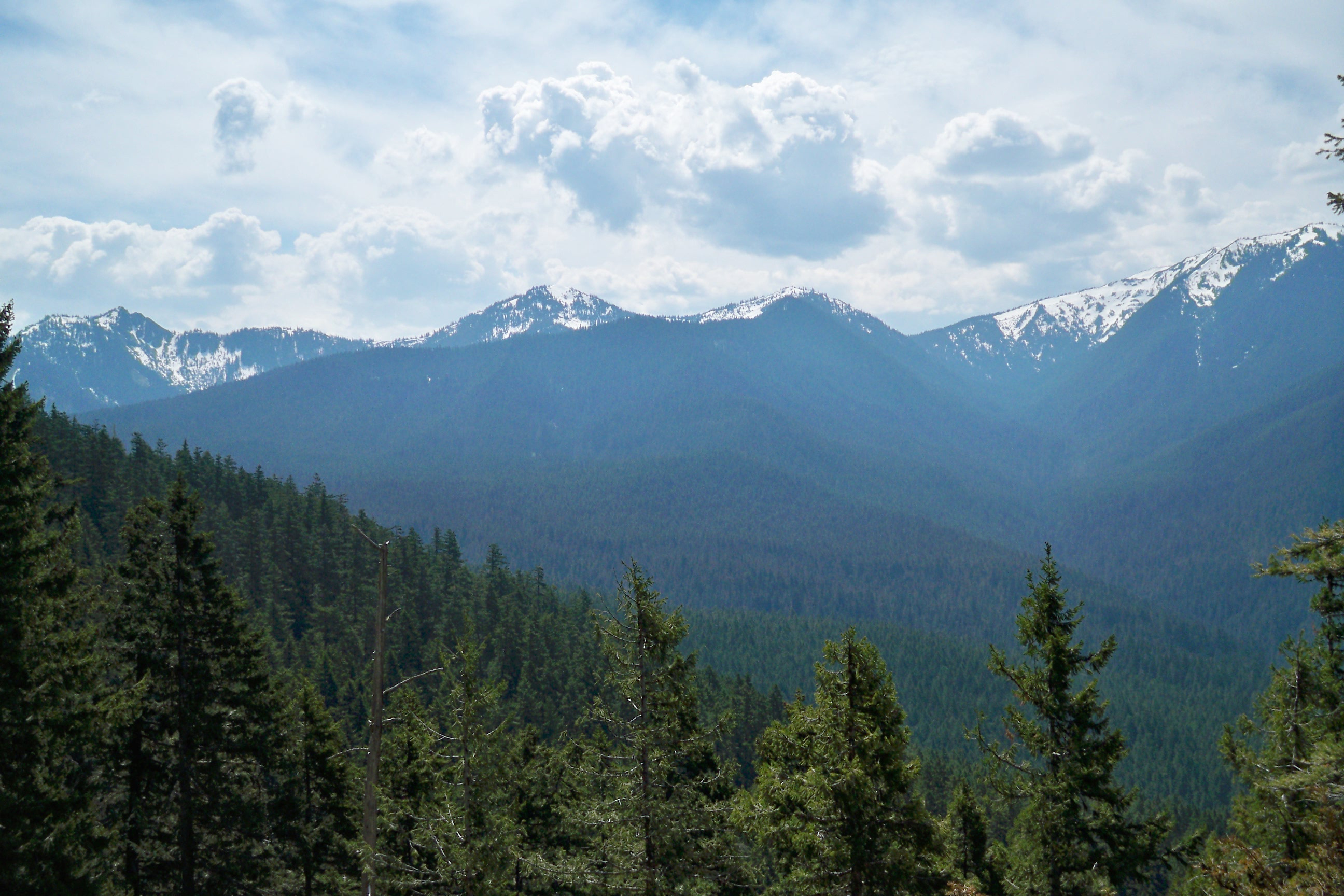
View of the Ajusco reserve from Ciudad Universitaria

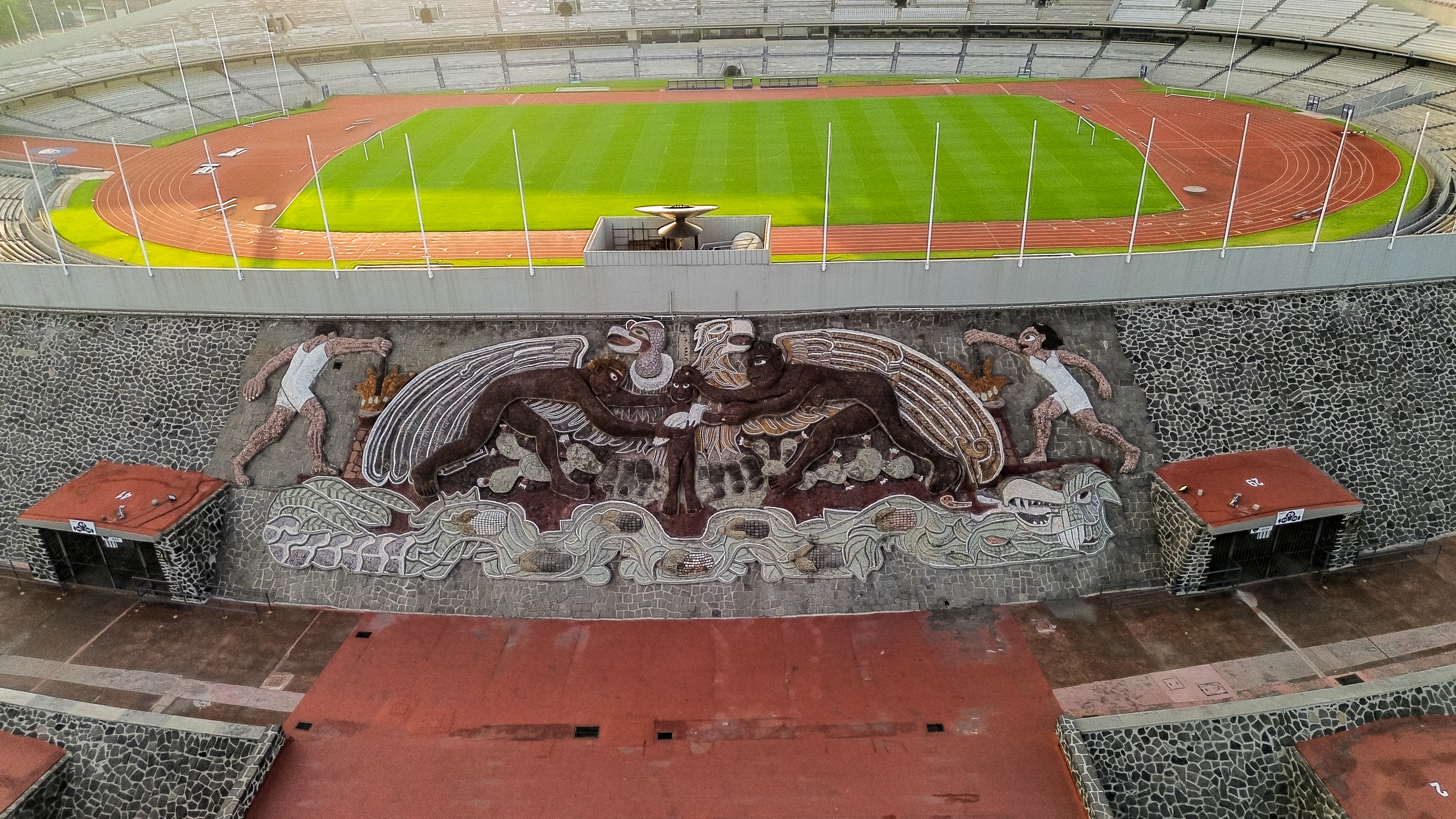
External view of the main entrance to the stadium
