= Manuel Isaías López =

Mexican psychiatrist (1941–2017)

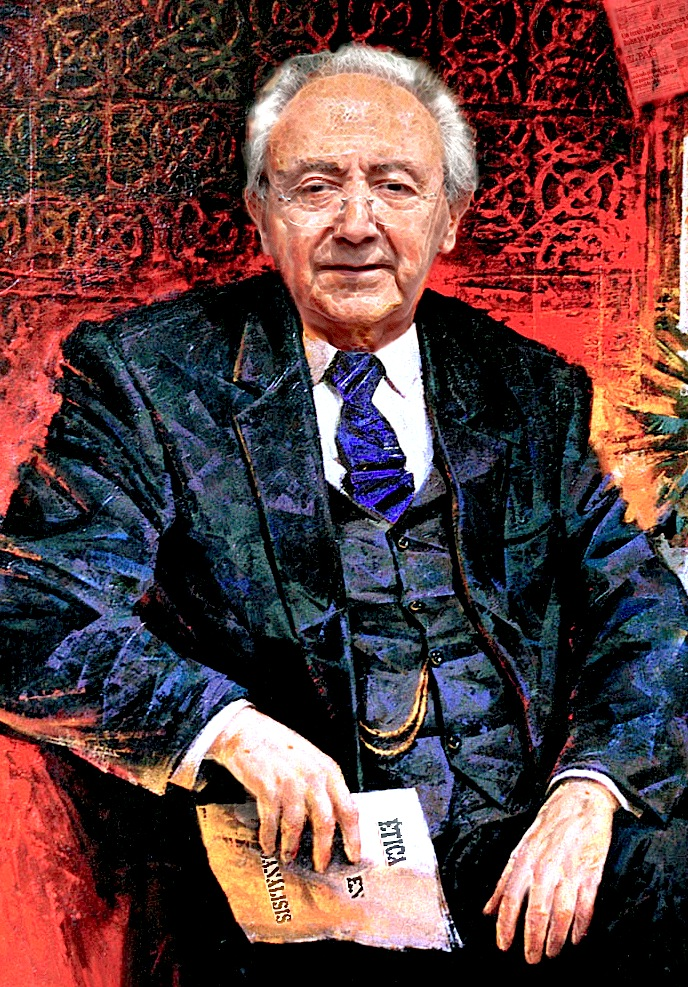
- Born: May 20, 1941; Mexico City, Mexico
- Died: November 29, 2017 (aged 76); New York City, United States
- Education: Universidad Nacional Autónoma de México, Woman's Medical College of Pennsylvania
- Scientific career
- Fields: Child psychiatry
- Institutions: Universidad Nacional Autónoma de México, Universidad Anáhuac, American British Cowdray Hospital, International Psychoanalytic Association, Institute for Psychoanalytic Training and Research, Asociación Psicoanalítica Mexicana

Manuel Isaías López (May 20, 1941 – November 29, 2017) was a prominent Mexican child psychiatrist, trained in Philadelphia. Many consider Manuel Isaías López to be the father of Mexican Child and Adolescent Psychiatry. In 1972, he founded the first Child and Adolescent Psychiatry subspecialty program in Mexico, at the National Autonomous University of Mexico (UNAM). He also founded and was the first president of AMPI (Mexican Child Psychiatry Association) in 1975. He was the training director of the only child and adolescent psychiatry training program in Mexico, at UNAM, from 1972 until 1998.

In the last quarter of the twentieth century, Manuel Isaías López was considered the most influential psychiatrist in Mexico. In the early 1980s, he was simultaneously president of the Mexican Psychoanalytic Association; secretary general of the Mexican Board of Psychiatry; director of child and adolescent psychiatry at UNAM; and main consultant to the System for the Integral Development of the Family (DIF), a nationwide government funded system of child and family guidance centers. His later contributions were in Bioethics, and he evolved into a researcher within this field and an International Psychoanalytic Association officer.

== Early life ==
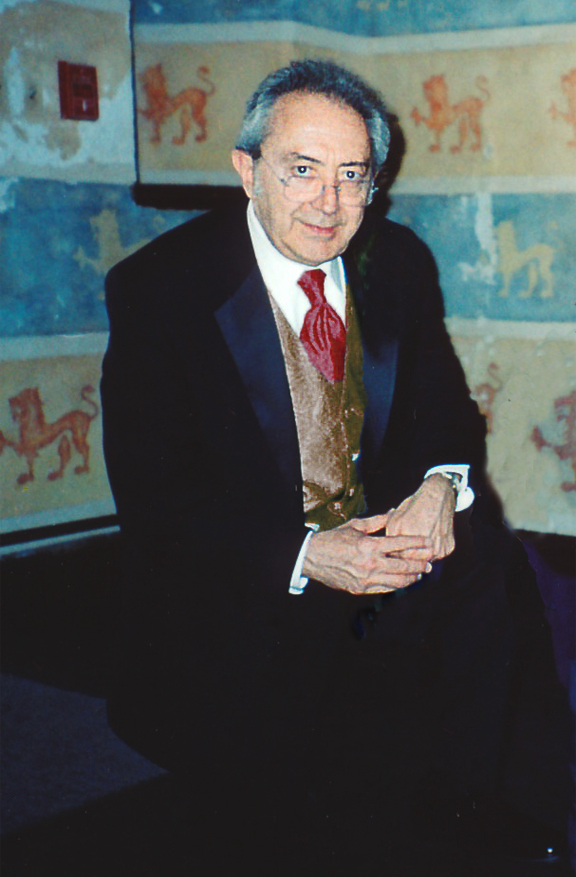
Manuel Isaias Lopez, in 2016

Manuel Isaías López was born into a middle-class family on 20 May 1941. Raised as an only child in downtown Mexico City, López's father, Isaías López Suárez, was a Spanish prestigious downtown "abarrotero" (grocer) who owned his own food store. López's mother, Carmen Gómez Alatriste (de López), came from a Mexican family with historical lineage in Puebla. Her family had been much involved in the Mexican Liberal Movement of the 19th Century. Carmen's cousin, Aquiles Serdán Alatriste, was a notable figure of the Mexican Revolution of 1910. Carmen was also great-granddaughter of Miguel Cástulo Alatriste, a Governor of Puebla who fought as a liberal and was slayed during the "Guerra de Reforma" (Reform War).

Manuel Isaías López was exposed to eminent Mexican intellectuals since he was a child. The influence of his academician uncle, Sealtiel L. Alatriste, and the writer and painter Dr. Atl (Gerardo Murillo) early on promoted his interest of the in-depth study of ideas and emotions. López's mother and grandmother often invited famous members of the Mexican cultural circles to their apartment in San Juan de Letrán Avenue, in downtown Mexico City. The building where López grew up housed the "Café Súper Leche", which later gained national prominence when the building collapsed in the 1985 Mexico City earthquake. Many of López's friends from childhood and their families died in the event.

== Education ==
López attended the Medical School at UNAM, Universidad Nacional Autónoma de México, with the idea of later training in Psychiatry and Psychoanalysis. As a medical student he developed strong relationships with the psychoanalytic group at UNAM, the psychiatrists at General Hospital of Mexico, and - through his father's Spanish connections - to the Hospital Español de México. These relationships would later support his efforts of integrating differing groups into the training program he developed at UNAM.

López then graduated as a psychiatrist from the Medical College of Pennsylvania, and as a child and adolescent psychiatrist from the Eastern Pennsylvania Psychiatric Institute (EPPI). He studied psychoanalysis and child psychoanalysis at the Institute of the Mexican Psychoanalytic Association.

== Psychiatric practice ==
López lived and practiced from 1972 to 2009 in a suburb of Mexico City. From 2009 to 2013 he practiced in Barcelona, Spain, and in New York from 2013 to 2017. During his last years, López helped organize the first program in child psychoanalytic training at IPTAR (The Institute For Psychoanalytic Training and Research), in New York City.

== Academic life ==
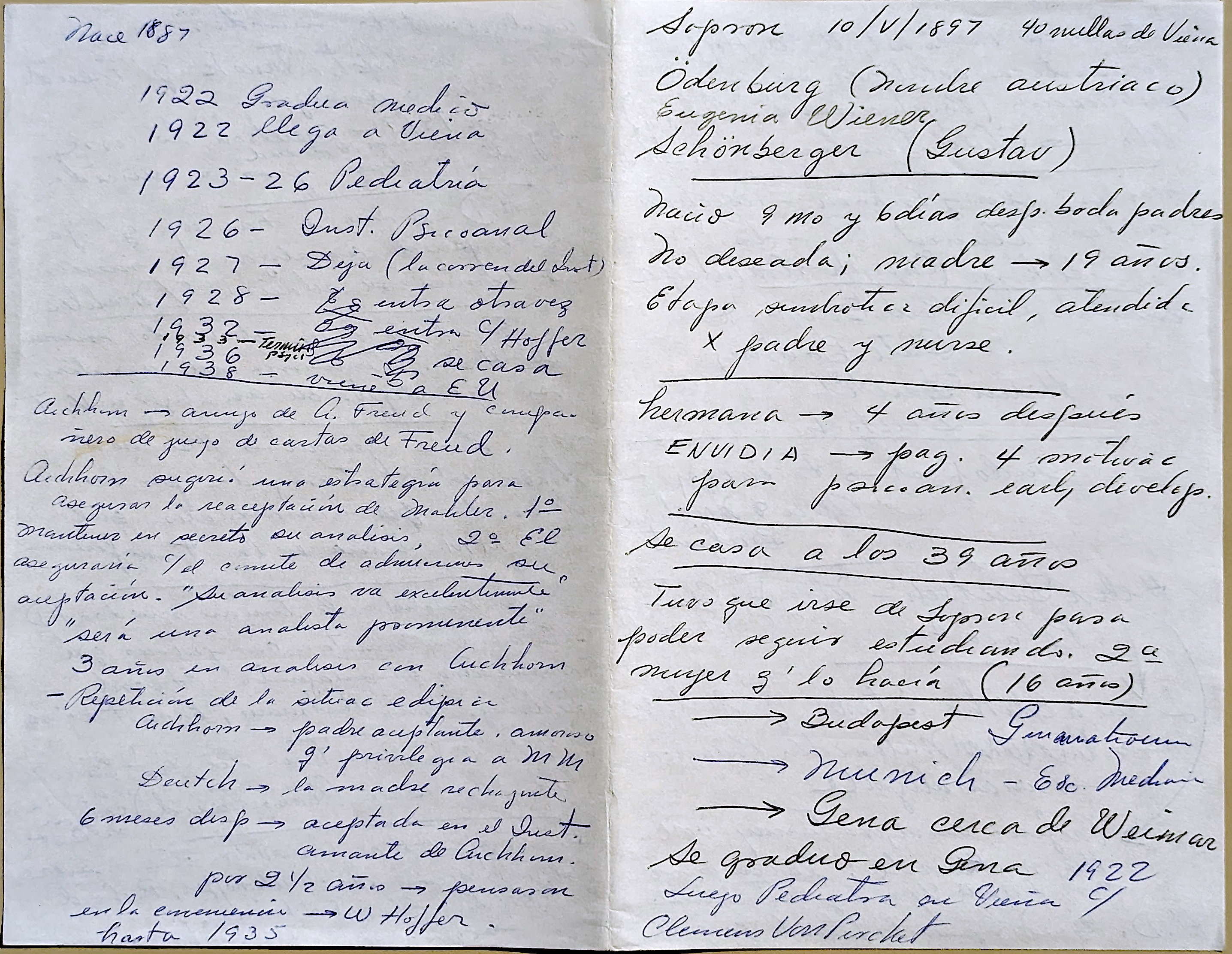
Personal notes of Manuel Isaías López regarding Margaret Mahler's biography (circa 2010).

López published more than 150 original articles and two books: "La Encrucijada de la Adolescencia ("The Crossroads of Adolescence") and "Ética en Psiquiatría, Psicoanálisis y Psicoterapia" ("Ethics in Psychiatry, Psychoanalysis, and Psychotherapy"). In 2018, the Manuel Isaías López Foundation published posthumously his book "Desarrollo de la Identidad y Nacionalismo Mexicanos: A Quinientos Años" ("The Development of Mexican Identity: A Psychological Perspective").

Mann de Dayán describes the "Sensory Oversaturation Syndrome" as López's main contribution to the psychodynamics of adolescence. According to this phenomenon, the adolescent manages to move away from his own narcissistic needs by overstimulating himself, as a first step before he projects his needs to outside sources.

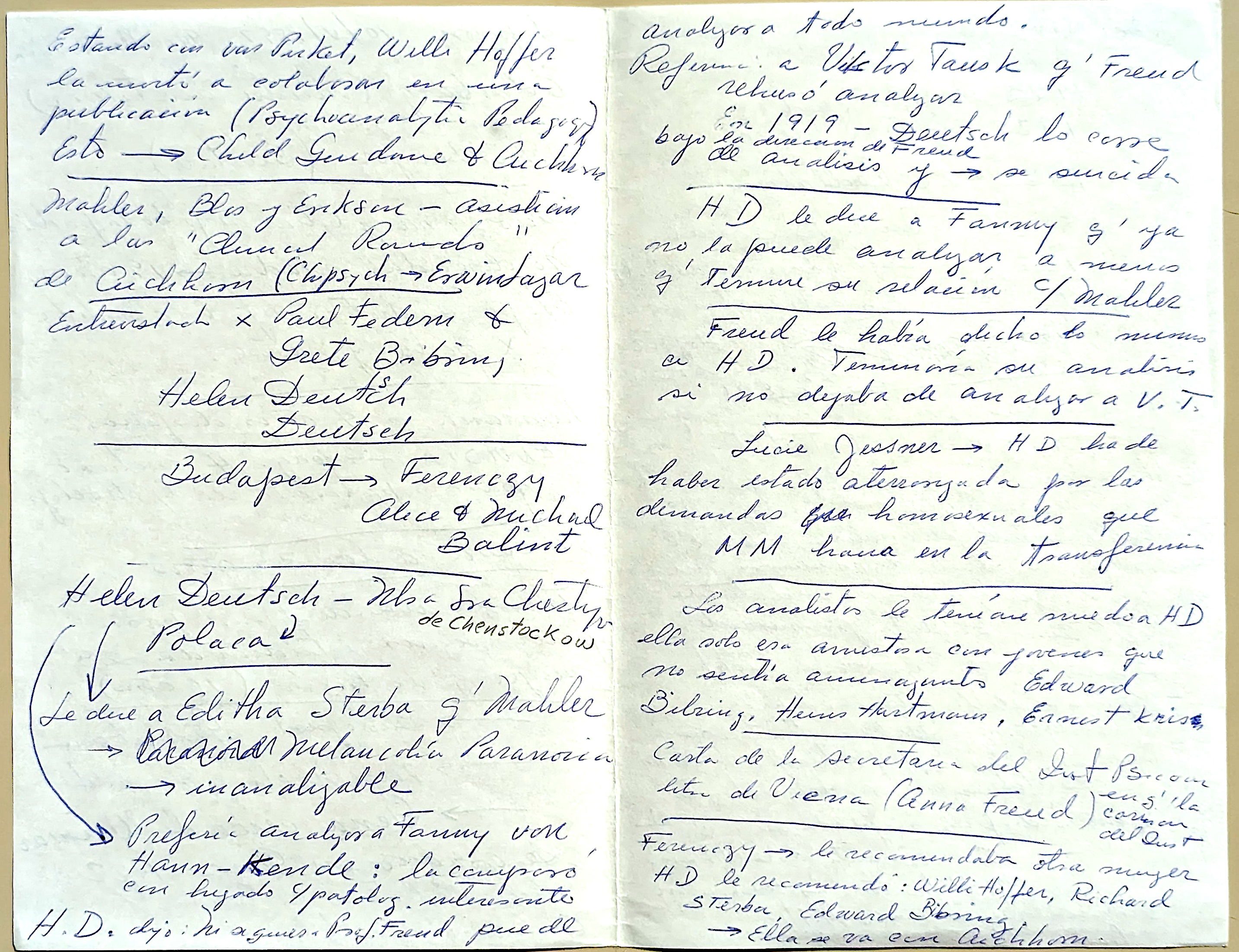
Personal notes of Manuel Isaías López regarding Margaret Mahler's biography (circa 2010)

== Death ==
Manuel Isaías López died in New York City on November 29, 2017.

== Publications ==
=== Compiled books ===
- Monografìa No. 1, MONOGRAFÍAS DE LA ASOCIACION MEXICANA DE PSIQUIATRÍA INFANTIL: Desarrollo Infantil Normal, 1976. México.
- ÉTICA Y RELACIÓN MÉDICO PACIENTE. CÓDIGO DEONTOLÓGICO DE LA ASOCIACIÓN PSIQUIÁTRICA MEXICANA. Pac Psiquiatría-2. México: Intersistemas. 1999.

=== Published books ===
- LA ENCRUCIJADA DE LA ADOLESCENCIA I. PSICOLOGÍA DE LA ADOLESCENCIA NORMAL. México: Ediciones y Distribuciones Hispánicas, 1988. Segunda edición: 1990.
- LA ENCRUCIJADA DE LA ADOLESCENCIA. PSICOLOGIA DE LA ADOLESCENCIA NORMAL. Tercera edición revisada, aumentada y actualizada. México: Editorial Fontamara. 2008.
- ÉTICA EN PSIQUIATRÍA, PSICOANÁLISIS Y PSICOTERAPIA. Primera Edición. Editorial Palibrio. 2013.
- DESARROLLO DE LA IDENTIDAD Y NACIONALISMO MEXICANOS: A QUINIENTOS AÑOS. Primera Edición. Fundación Manuel Isaías López, 2018 (publicación póstuma).

=== Chapters in published books ===
- Consecuencias Psiquiátricas del Síndrome del Niño Golpeado. En: Marcovich, (ed): EL MALTRATO A LOS HIJOS, pp. 111–118, 1978. México.
- El Desarrollo Psicosexual. En: Dulanto, E. (ed) EL ADOLESCENTE, pp. 73–79. México: McGrow-Hill Interamericana, 1989.
- Las Representaciones Mentales de los Padres: Su Papel en el Desarrollo Psicológico del Niño. La Transmisión de Características Específicamente Humanas. En “LA TEORÍA PSICOANALÍTICA DE LAS RELACIONES DE OBJETO: DEL INDIVIDUO A LA FAMILIA”, Eds. L. Estrada-Inda y J.L. Salinas. México: Ediciones y Distribuciones Hispánicas, 1990. (Con León N.A.).
- Historia y Orientación del Tratamiento Psicoanalítico de Niños y Adolescentes. En: Salles, M., MANUAL DE PSICOANÁLISIS Y PSICOTERAPIA DE NIÑOS Y ADOLESCENTES, pp. 9–40, 1992. México: Grupo Editorial Planeta. (Con León N.A.).
- La Terapia Psicoanalítica del Adolescente. En: Salles, M. MANUAL DE PSICOANÁLISIS Y PSICOTERAPIA DE NIÑOS Y ADOLESCENTES, pp. 189–214, 1992, México: Grupo Editorial Planeta.
- Desarrollo prenatal. En: Dallal, E.; CAMINOS DEL DESARROLLO PSICOLÓGICO. Vol. I: De lo Prenatal al Primer Año de Vida. México: Plaza y Valdés Eds., 1998. (Con León, N.A.)
- Consideraciones Éticas. En Dupont M A: MANUAL CLÍNICO DE PSICOTERAPIA. México: JGH editores, pp. 161–172, 1999.
- Presentación. Introducción. Fundamentación del Código Deontológico. En
- López, M.I.: ÉTICA Y RELACIÓN MÉDICO PACIENTE. CÓDIGO DEONTOLÓGICO DE LA ASOCIACIÓN PSIQUIÁTRICA MEXICANA. Pac
- Psiquiatría-2. México: Intersistemas, 1999.
- La Adolescencia como autoconstrucción. Desarrollo del autoproyecto de vida. En: Dallal, E. (coordinador): CAMINOS DEL DESARROLLO PSICOLÓGICO Volumen III. México: Plaza y Valdés. 2001.
- Desarrollo y Conciencia. Con Norma A. León. En: Dallal, E. (coordinador): CAMINOS DEL DESARROLLO PSICOLÓGICO Volumen IV. De la Edad Adulta a la Vejez. México: Plaza y Valdés, 2003.
- Repercusiones en el desarrollo psicológico de las técnicas de fecundación asistida. En: Dallal, E. (coordinador): CAMINOS DEL DESARROLLO PSICOLÓGICO Volumen IV. De la Edad Adulta a la Vejez. México: Plaza y Valdés, 2003.
- El aspirante a psicoterapeuta. En: Gómez, A. (coordinadora) ÉTICA EN EL DIVÁN.
- Buenos Aires: Lumen, 2003.
- El adolescente como mortal. En: Dallal, E. (coordinador): CAMINOS DEL DESARROLLO PSICOLÓGICO Volumen V. La Muerte. México: Plaza y Valdés, 2005.
- Ética, Ciencia y Psiquiatría en: Asociación Psiquiátrica Mexicana: MANUAL DE TRASTORNOS MENTALES. México: Asociación Psiquiátrica Mexicana: Noviembre de 2005. Con: López-Munguía, F. y Tarasco-Michel, M.
- Aspecto emocional: relación médico-paciente en los comités hospitalarios de bioética. En: Tarasco, M. (coordinadora): COMITÉS HOSPITALARIOS DE BIOÉTICA. México: Manual Moderno, 2007.

=== Published articles ===
- Child Rearing Practices in Mexico. PENNSYLVANIA PSYCHIATRIC QUARTERLY, 9:52-60, EUA., 1969. (Con León, N.A.).
- Procedimientos Para la Evaluación Psiquiátrica. DIAGNÓSTICO CLÍNICO EN PEDIATRÍA, Pediatría Clínica: Shor, Bastien, Herrera; Eds. Dirección General de Servicios Médicos del Departamento del Distrito Federal, 1972. México.
- El Síndrome del Niño Golpeado (Resumen). VII CONGRESO DE LOS SERVICIOS MÉDICOS DEL DEPARTAMENTO DEL DISTRITO FEDERAL, MEMORIA, pp. 828, Noviembre de 1972. México.
- Emergencias Psiquiátricas en la Infancia y en la Adolescencia. REVISTA DE LA CLÍNICA DE LA CONDUCTA, 6:10-15, junio, 1973. México.
- Effectos de la Marihuana sobre las Funciones del Sensorio de los Adolescentes. NEUROLOGIA - NEUROCIRUGÍA - PSIQUIATRÍA, 14:33-40, 1973. México.
- CUESTIONARIO DE PSICOLOGÍA GENERAL COMO BASE AL CURSO DE DESARROLLO Y PSICOLOGÍA INFANTIL. Colegio de Maestras de Educación Preescolar. A.C., 1973. México.
- Teoría General del Desarrollo Psicológico. BOLETÍN DEL COLEGIO DE MAESTROS DE EDUCACION PREESCOLAR, 1974–1975. México.
- Violencia en la Infancia y en la Adolescencia. PSIQUIATRÍA, 5:30-34, 1975. México.
- La Psicodinamia de las Psicosis Infantiles. NEUROLOGÍA - NEUROCIRUGÍA - PSIQUIATRÍA, 16:167-175, 1975. México.
- El Estado Actual de la Psiquiatría Infantil en México. Concepto de Psiquiatría Infantil Como Especialidad. PSIQUIATRÍA, 6:65-70, 1976. México. (Con Katz, G).
- Terapia Estructural. Modelo Integral para el Manejo del Niño Psicótico. NEUROLOGÍA - NEUROCIRUGÍA - PSIQUIATRÍA, Vol. XVII, No. 3, p. 181-186, 1976. México. (Con León N.A.).
- Proyecto Para el Servicio de Psiquiatría Infantil de la Dirección General de Servicios Médicos del Departamento del Distrito Federal. REVISTA MEXICANA DE PEDIATRIA, 45:179-194, 1976. México.
- El Síndrome del Niño Golpeado. PSIQUIATRÍA, 6:44-47, 1976. México. (Con Escamilla, A).
- Introducción al primer número de MONOGRAFÍAS DE LA ASOCIACION MEXICANA DE PSIQUIATRÍA INFANTIL: Desarrollo Infantil Normal. p. 7-9, 1976. México.
- Teoría General del Desarrollo Psicológico en el Niño. MONOGRAFÍAS DE LA ASOCIACION MEXICANA DE PSIQUIATRIA INFANTIL: Desarrollo Infantil Normal, Monografía I, pp. 11–34, 1976. México.
- La Reactivación de Restos Edípicos en la Adolescencia. CUADERNOS DE PSICOANÁLISIS, 9:83-94, 1976. México.
- La Muerte de Uno de los Padres como Factor Precipitante del Material Inconsciente en el Niño y Consecuente Aparición de Psicopatología. CUADERNOS DE PSICONÁLISIS, 10:137-183, 1977. México.
- Consecuencias Psiquiátricas del Síndrome del Niño Golpeado. EL MALTRATO A LOS HIJOS, Marcovich, ed., pp. 111–118, 1978. México.
- La Representación Mental que los Padres tienen del Hijo por Nacer y su Importancia como Determinante en el Desarrollo Psicológico. CUADERNOS DE PSICOANÁLISIS, 11:178-197, 1978. México.
- Discurso Inaugural del I Congreso de Psiquiatría Infantil. MONOGRAFÍAS DE LA AMPI, 2:7-9. México.
- El Niño Diabético. Implicaciones Psicológicas al Tratamiento. PSIQUIATRÍA, 9:20-24, 1979. México.
- Psicosis Simbiótica o Follie a Deux. Presentación de Un Caso. CUADERNOS DE PSICOANÁLISIS, 12:113-123, 1979. México. (Con León, N.A.).
- Trastornos de la Conducta en los Niños (Mesa redonda coordinada por el Dr. Jaime Segura del Castillo, Editor de la Revista de la Facultad de Medicina, UNAM.). REVISTA DE LA FACULTAD DE MEDICINA, UNAM., 22:8-29, 1979. México. (Con Segura, J.; Cuevas, L.; Martínez, D.; Rodarte, M. y Toscano S.)
- Determinantes de la Representación Mental que los Padres Desarrollan de su Futuro Hijo y sus Repercusiones Posteriores. SALUD MENTAL, 2:12-14, 1979. México.
- Formalización del Adiestramiento en Psiquiatría Infantil. MONOGRAFÍAS DE LA ASOCIACION MEXICANA DE PSIQUIATRÍA INFANTIL, Monografía 3, pp. 21–30, 1980. México.
- La Psicoterapia como Parte del Manejo Integral de la Psicosis Infantil. MONOGRAFÍAS DE LA ASOCIACION MEXICANA DE PSIQUIATRÍA INFANTIL, Monografía 3, pp. 168–176, 1980. México. (Con León N.A.).
- La Fantasía en el Niño. Estudio de la Fantasía a Través de la Psicoterapia Infantil. NEUROLOGÍA - NEUROCIRUGÍA - PSIQUIATRÍA, 21:97-104, 1980. México.
- Seminario de Casos Clínicos. SALUD MENTAL, 3:29-37, 1980. México. (Con Pérez Rincón, H.; Macías, G. y Uriarte, V.).
- Ideología Actual sobre el Retardo Mental. PSIQUIATRÍA, 10:171-178, 1980. México.
- La Formalización del Adiestramiento en Psiquiatría Infantil. SALUD MENTAL, 4:8-11, 1981. México.
- La Quiebra Funcional Psicofisiológica. La Reacción Emocional ante la Enfermedad. ANALES MÉDICOS, 26:121-128, 1981. México.
- Desarrollo Psicosexual en la Adolescencia. MONOGRAFIAS DE LA ASOCIACIÓN MEXICANA DE PSIQUIATRÍA INFANTIL, monografía IV, Adolescencia Normal en México, pp. 81–104, 1982. México.
- La Resolución de la Adolescencia y el Logro de las Relaciones Objetales Adultas. CUADERNOS DE PSICOANÁLISIS, 15:7-35, 1982. México.
- Mesa Redonda Sobre el Paciente Borderline en México. (Coordinada por el Dr. Jaime Ayala). NEUROLOGÍA - NEUROCIRUGÍA - PSIQUIATRÍA, 23:49-52, 1982. México. (Con Palacios, A.; Pallares, A.M. y Díaz, H.).
- Estudio del Desarrollo de la Relación de Objeto en la Resolución de la Adolescencia, a Través de la Producción Poética. CUADERNOS DE PSICOANALISIS, 16:7-21, 1983. México.
- El Fenómeno Psicótico. De la magia a la Psicofarmacología. El Papel del Psicoanálisis. CUADERNOS DE PSICOANÁLISIS, 17:7-14, 1984. México.
- La Historia de la Enseñanza de la Psiquiatría Infantil en México. SALUD MENTAL, Vol. 8 Número 2, pags. 17–19, 1985. México.
- La Psicoterapia Como Parte del Tratamiento Global del Menor Canceroso. SALUD MENTAL, Vol. 8 Número 3, pags. 8–14, 1985. México.
- Del Aspecto Formal al Aspecto Afectivo de la Terminación del Tratamiento Psicoanalítico de Niños. CUADERNOS DE PSICOANÁLISIS, 18:172-178, 1985. México.
- El Desarrollo Infantil: Un Concepto Integral. En: EL NIÑO AL INICIO DE SU ETAPA ESCOLAR. SEP., Subsecretaría de Educación Elemental-Asociación Mexicana de Psiquiatría Infantil, 1985. México.
- After the Earthquake. SCIENTIFIC PROCEEDINGS PRESENTED AL THE 33RD ANNUAL MEETING OF THE AMERICAN ACADEMY OF CHILD AND ADOLESCENT PSYCHIATRY, Los Angeles, California, pp. 54. Octubre de 1986. EUA. (Con de la Vega, E.; Dallal, E. y Cuevas, P.).
- El Adolescente de Hoy en la Sociedad Urbana. PSIQUIATRIA, 2a. época, 3: 5–15, 1987. México.
- Problemas de la Enseñanza de la Psicoterapia. PSIQUIATRÍA, 2a época. 3:121-132, 1987. México.
- Influencias de la Cultura en el Desarrollo del Niño. MONOGRAFÍAS DE LA ASOCIACIÓN MEXICANA DE PSIQUIATRÍA INFANTIL, Monografía VI, El Niño, la Escuela y la Familia, pp. 58–64, 1988. México.
- El Sueño y la Fantasía Masturbatoria Central. CUADERNOS DE PSICOANÁLISIS, 20:28-34, 1987. México.
- LA ENCRUCIJADA DE LA ADOLESCENCIA I. PSICOLOGÍA DE LA ADOLESCENCIA NORMAL. México: Ediciones y Distribuciones Hispánicas, 1988.
- Los Niños Recién Nacidos Rescatados de las Derrumbes Causados por el Terremoto de 1985. Implicaciones en el Desarrollo Psicológico. PSIQUIATRÍA, 2a. época, 4:204-218, 1988. México. (Con León N.A.)
- La Supervisión como Parte de la Formación Psicoanalítica. CUADERNOS DE PSICOANÁLISIS, 21: 117–127, 1988.
- Presente y Futuro en la Formación del Psiquiatra Infantil. PSIQUIATRÍA, 2a. época, 5: 119–125, 1989. México.
- Babies of the Earthquake: Follow-up Study of Their First 15 Months. HILLSIDE JOURNAL OF CLINICAL PSYCHIATRY, 11 (2): 147–168, 1989. EUA. (Con León N.A.).
- Las Representaciones Mentales de los Padres: Su Papel en el Desarrollo Psicológico del Niño. La Transmisión de Características Específicamente Humanas. En “LA TEORÍA PSICOANALÍTICA DE LAS RELACIONES DE OBJETO: DEL INDIVIDUO A LA FAMILIA”, Eds. L. Estrada-Inda y J.L. Salinas. México: Ediciones y Distribuciones Hispánicas, 1990. (Con León N.A.).
- El Desarrollo Psicosexual. En: Dulanto, E. : EL ADOLESCENTE, pp. 73–79. México: McGrow-Hill Interamericana, 1989.
- La Comunicación con el Adolescente. PSIQUIATRIA, 6: 87–96, 1990. México.
- ¿Quién es Batman en la Fantasía? BOLETÍN INFORMATIVO DE LA ASOCIACIÓN MEXICANA DE PSIQUIATRÍA INFANTIL, A.C., Tercer y cuarto trimestre de 1990, pp. 9–10. México.
- Mahler, Sus Seguidores y el Pequeño Juanito. CUADERNOS DE PSICOANÁLISIS, 23:43-49, 1990. México.
- El Adolescente y la Psicoterapia. CUADERNOS DE PSICOANÁLISIS, 23:125-131, 1990. México.
- Separación-Individuación y Nacimiento Psicológico del Hombre de los Lobos. CUADERNOS DE PSICOANÁLISIS, 23:133-139, 1990. México. (Con Balderas, R.A.).
- Los Primeros 15 años de la AMPI. ¿Qué tal “la hemos hecho”? BOLETÍN INFORMATIVO DE LA ASOCIACIÓN MEXICANA DE PSIQUIATRÍA INFANTIL, A.C., Primer trimestre de 1991, pp. 6–10. México.
- Historia del Psicoanálisis en México. NEUROLOGÍA - NEUROCIRUGÍA - PSIQUIATRÍA, 30: 17–20, 1991. México.
- Otros Mecanismos Defensivos en la Adolescencia. CUADERNOS DE PSICOANÁLISIS, 24:59-66, 1991. México.
- El Papel de la Supervisión en el Desarrollo de la Identidad del Psicoanalista. CUADERNOS DE PSICOANÁLISIS, 24:99-104, 1991, México.
- La Práctica de la Psicoterapia, ¿Quién la Ejerce? PSIQUIATRÍA, 2a. época, 7: 89–94, 1991. México. (Con León, N.A.).
- La Psicoterapia del Adolescente. PSIQUIATRIA, 2a. época, 7: 113–119, 1991. México.
- Historia e Impacto de la Psiquiatría Infantil Institucional. SALUD MENTAL, 15: 36–41, 1992. México.
- La Gestación y el Parto Psicológico del Infante. CUADERNOS DE PSICOANÁLISIS, 25:71-81, 1992. México. (Con León, N.A.).
- Formación Psiquiátrica Infantil. Atención del Individuo en Desarrollo. PSIQUIATRIA, 2a. época, 8: 25–29, 1992. México.
- Educación y Conducta Sexual del Adolescente. REVISTA MEXICANA DE PSIQUIATRIA INFANTIL, 1:18-22, 1992. México.
- El Proyecto, Casi 100 Años Después. CUADERNOS DE PSICOANÁLISIS, 25:99-103, 1992. México.
- El Mito de la Masturbación. CUADERNOS DE PSICOANÁLISIS, 25: 147–155, 1992. México.
- Historia y Orientación del Tratamiento Psicoanalítico de Niños y Adolescentes. En : Salles, M., MANUAL DE PSICOANÁLISIS Y PSICOTERAPIA DE NIÑOS Y ADOLESCENTES, pp. 9–40, 1992. México: Grupo Editorial Planeta. (Con León N.A.).
- La Terapia Psicoanalítica del Adolescente. En: Salles, M. MANUAL DE PSICOANÁLISIS Y PSICOTERAPIA DE NIÑOS Y ADOLESCENTES, pp. 189–214, 1992, México: Grupo Editorial Planeta.
- Origen del Nacionalismo Mexicano. CUADERNOS DE LA SOCIEDAD DE BENEFICENCIA ESPAÑOLA, 6: 4–18, 1992. México.
- Comentario al trabajo de la Dra. Rosa Ma. Barajas “El Padre Inventado”. CUADERNOS DE PSICOANALISIS, 26:98-102, 1993. México.
- Ethics in the practice of psychotherapy: are there cultural differences? SCIENTIFIC PROCEEDINGS OF THE ANNUAL MEETING, AMERICAN ACADEMY OF CHILD AND ADOLESCENT PSYCHIATRY, 9: 24, 1993. E.U.A.
- Revisión Comparativa de los Estándares Éticos de Nuestra Práctica Profesional. CUADERNOS DE PSICOANALISIS, 26:246-258, 1993. México.
- Los Problemas Psico-Sociales del Niño. PSIQUIATRÍA, 2a. época. 9:98-103, 1993. México.
- El interés en la Bioética. REVISTA MEXICANA DE PSIQUIATRÍA INFANTIL, 2, 2:28, 1993.
- El simposio de ética de la AMPI. REVISTA MEXICANA DE PSIQUIATRÍA INFANTIL, 2,3:29, 1993.
- El castigo físico. REVISTA MEXICANA DE PSIQUIATRÍA INFANTIL, 2,4:22-23, 1993.
- Comentario al trabajo del Dr. Harold Blum: Reconstrucción, Realidad Psíquica e Historia. CUADERNOS DE PSICOANÁLISIS, 27:109-113, 1994. México.
- Ética en la Práctica de la Psicoterapia. MEMORIAS, IV CONGRESO NACIONAL DE LA ASOCIACIÓN MEXICANA DE PSICOTERAPIA PSICOANALÍTICA DE LA INFANCIA Y DE LA ADOLESCENCIA, octubre de 1993.
- Ética en la psicoterapia. ¿differencias culturales? CUADERNOS DE PSICOANÁLISIS, 27: 235–251, 1994. México.
- El narcisismo en el médico. REVISTA MEXICANA DE PSIQUIATRÍA INFANTIL, 3,1:29, 1994.
- La ética y el narcisismo. REVISTA MEXICANA DE PSIQUIATRÍA INFANTIL, 3,2:37, 1994.
- Las presentaciones clínicas en psiquiatría. REVISTA MEXICANA DE PSIQUIATRÍA INFANTIL, 3,3:11, 1994.
- Ética en la práctica del psicoanálisis y la psicoterapia. ¿hay differencias culturales? CUADERNOS DE PSICOANÁLISIS, Suplemento al volumen 27, pp. 137–162, 1995.
- Sueño y Fantasía en la Adolescencia. MEMORIAS, V CONGRESO NACIONAL DE LA ASOCIACIÓN MEXICANA DE PSICOTERAPIA PSICOANALÍTICA DE LA INFANCIA Y DE LA ADOLESCENCIA, pp. 220–228, septiembre de 1995.
- Comentario al libro de Juan Vives y Teresa Lartigue “Apego y Vínculo Materno-Infantil”. Revista Mexicana de Psiquiatría Infantil, Sección Bibliográfica, Volumen 3, N. 4, Volumen 4, N 1, pp. 35–39, 1995.
- La violencia en la interacción del adolescente y su familia. REVISTA MEXICANA DE PSIQUIATRÍA INFANTIL, 4: 18–26, 1995, México.
- La ética del psiquiatra frente a las convicciones del paciente. REVISTA MEXICANA DE PSIQUIATRÍA INFANTIL, 3,4, 1994 y 4,1:32, 1995.
- Los indicadores de futuras transgresiones mayores a la ética. REVISTA MEXICANA DE PSIQUIATRÍA INFANTIL, 3,4, 1994 y 4,1:33-34. 1995.
- ¿Quién es doctor? REVISTA MEXICANA DE PSIQUIATRÍA INFANTIL, 4,2 y 3:36-37, 1995.
- ¿...Y qué hay de los diplomas? REVISTA MEXICANA DE PSIQUIATRÍA INFANTIL, 4,4:32-33, 1995.
- Las parafilias. PSIQUIATRÍA, 12:14-17, 1996, México.
- Actividades recreativas en los establecimientos especializados. REVISTA MEXICANA DE PSIQUIATRÍA INFANTIL, 5,1:25-26, 1996.
- Trastornos de atención e hiperactividad. BOLETÍN DE NEUROCIENCIAS, Hospital ABC, 1:3, 1996.
- El sueño y la fantasía en la adolescencia. CUADERNOS DE PSICOANÁLISIS, 29:55-63, 1996.
- ¿Qué es la ética? REVISTA MEXICANA DE PSIQUIATRÍA INFANTIL, 5,2:20-22, 1996.
- Comentario oficial al libro del Dr. Lauro Estrada-Inda ¿Por qué deja de amarnos nuestra pareja? Leído durante la presentación del libro en la Asociación Psicoanalítica Mexicana el 26 de abril de 1996. CUADERNOS DE PSICOANÁLISIS, 29:237-239, 1996.
- El Secreto Profesional. PSIQUIATRÍA, 13-51-52, 1997.
- Comentario al trabajo de la Dra. Paulina Kernberg: On a Particular Form of Identity Diffusion: The Quiet "Borderline". CUADERNOS DE PSICOANÁLISIS, 30:151-154, 1997.
- Cualquier actuación erótica con un paciente psiquiátrico implica siempre una transgresión ética. PSIQUIATRÍA, Época 2, 13:85-92, 1997.
- Desarrollo prenatal. En: Dallal, E.; Caminos del Desarrollo Psicológico. Vol. I: De lo Prenatal al Primer Año de Vida. México: Plaza y Valdés Eds., 1998. (Con León, N.A.)
- Comentario oficial en la Conferencia Magistral "Depresión. Sufrimiento y Liberación" del Dr. Guillermo Calderón Narváez, IV Foro de Investigación. Universidad Intercontinental, México, DF, 11 de septiembre de 1997. REVISTA MEXICANA DE PSIQUIATRÍA INFANTIL, 5:41-43, 1996.
- Uso y abuso de la palabra doctor. REVISTA MEXICANA DE PSIQUIATRÍA INFANTIL, 5:29-36, 1996.
- Las Normas en los Llamados Códigos de Ética. REVISTA MEXICANA DE PSIQUIATRÍA INFANTIL, 6:91-92, 1997.
- Bioética y Psiquiatría en México. El Apoyo Jurídico. PSIQUIATRÍA, 14:89-94, 1998.
- Ética en el Manejo de Urgencias. Boletín de Neurociencias. Hospital ABC. 3:5-6. Diciembre de 1998.
- Desarrollo prenatal. En: Dallal, E.; Caminos del Desarrollo Psicológico. Vol. I: De lo Prenatal al Primer Año de Vida. México: Plaza y Valdés Eds., 1998. (Con León, N.A.)
- Dilemas Éticos en la Fecundación Asistida. Argumentación Psicológica. PERINATOLOGÍA Y REPRODUCCIÓN HUMANA, 13:67-76, 1999.
- Presentación. Introducción. Fundamentación del Código Deontológico. En López, M.I.: ÉTICA Y RELACIÓN MÉDICO PACIENTE. CÓDIGO DEONTOLÓGICO DE LA ASOCIACIÓN PSIQUIÁTRICA MEXICANA. Psiquiatría-2. México: Intersistemas, 1999.
- Consideraciones Éticas. En Dupont M A: MANUAL CLÍNICO DE PSICOTERAPIA. México: JGH editores, pp. 161–172, 1999.
- Trastornos del Afecto en la Adolescencia. Boletín de Neurociencias. American British Cowdray Hospital. Vol. 4, N. 6, diciembre de 1999.
- La Metodología en la Bioética. CUADERNOS DE PSICOANÁLISIS, 33:151-156, 2000.
- La Adolescencia como autoconstrucción. Desarrollo del autoproyecto de vida. En: Dallal, E. (coordinador): CAMINOS DEL DESARROLLO PSICOLÓGICO. Volumen III. México: Plaza y Valdés. 2001.
- La Metodología de la Ética. PSIQUIATRÍA, 2ª época, mayo-agosto 2001, 17:51-53. México.
- Desarrollo y Conciencia. Con Norma A. León. CUADERNOS DE PSICOANÁLISIS, 34:57-63. 2001.
- Capacitar a médicos y familiares para la detección temprana de los trastornos del desarrollo infantil. HOSPITAL NET, 1:6, México, 2001.
- Dilemas éticos en la fecundación asistida. Argumentación psicológica. MEDICINA E MORALE. REVISTA DI BIOETICA E DEONTOLOGÍA MEDICA. 3:477-492, 2002.
- Los orígenes de la autoconciencia del niño en la relación vincular de los padres. Con Norma A. León. En: Dallal, E. (coordinador): CAMINOS DEL DESARROLLO PSICOLÓGICO Volumen IV. De la Edad Adulta a la Vejez. México: Plaza y Valdés, 2003.
- Repercusiones en el desarrollo psicológico de las técnicas de fecundación asistida. En: Dallal, E. (coordinador): CAMINOS DEL DESARROLLO PSICOLÓGICO Volumen IV. De la Edad Adulta a la Vejez. México: Plaza y Valdés, 2003.
- El aspirante a psicoterapeuta. En: Gómez, A. (coordinadora) ÉTICA EN EL DIVÁN. Buenos Aires: Lumen, 2003.
- El Progreso y la Familia. Página Web de la Universidad Anáhuac, Facultad de Bioética, Investigación. Trabajos de Investigación. 6 de agosto de 2003.
- Bioética y Psiquiatría en México. El Apoyo Jurídico Nacional y Proyección del Derecho Internacional. Facultad de Bioética, Investigación. Trabajos de Investigación. 6 de agosto de 2003.
- El adolescente como mortal. En: Dallal, E. (coordinador): CAMINOS DEL DESARROLLO PSICOLÓGICO Volumen V, La Muerte. México: Plaza y Valdés, 2005.
- Psiquiatría y bioética. En: Rivero, L. E. y Zárate, L. (eds.): MANUAL DE TRASTORNOS MENTALES.Manual deTrastornos Mentales. México: Asociación Psiquiátrica Mexicana, 2005. Con López-Munguía, F. y Tarasco-Michel, M.
- Bioética y psiquiatría en México. El apoyo jurídico nacional y proyección del derecho internacional. PSIQUIATRÍA, 21:15-21, 2005.
- Investigación de Actitudes de los Profesionales de la Psicoterapia en Relación a la Actuación Erótica dentro de la Relación Psicoterapéutica. Psiquiatría 21:1-11. (2005) con Tarasco Michel, M.; Cuevas Covarrubias C.; León Robles, N.; López-León, S.
- Aspecto emocional: relación médico-paciente en los comités hospitalarios de bioética. En: Tarasco, M. (coordinadora): COMITÉS HOSPITALARIOS DE BIOÉTICA. México: Manual Moderno, 2007.
- El Acto Humano: Libertad y Determinismo. PSIQUIATRÍA, 24:5-16, 2008
- La Encrucijada de la Adolescencia, Tercera Edición. Corregida, aumentada y actualizada. Editorial Fontamara, 2008
- Psicología de la sexualidad en el desarrollo humano. En: J. Kuthy, J.J. Villalobos, O. Martínez, M. Tarasco Introducción a la Bioética, pp. 197–212 (Con Tarasco, M.) 2009.
- La relación médico-paciente. En: J. Kuthy, J.J. Villalobos, O. Martínez, M. Tarasco Introducción a la Bioética, pp. 197–212 (Con Tarasco, M.).
- El proceso adolescente, 2009.
- La libertad como fundamento del acto humano. En: García Fernandez, D. y Tarasco, M. :BIOETICA. UN ACERCAMIENTO MÉDICO Y JURÍDICO. México: Purrua-Anáhuac, 2011
- Investigación de Actitudes de los Profesionales de la Psicoterapia en Relación a la Actuación Erótica dentro de la Relación Psicoterapéutica. Con Tarasco Michel, M.; Cuevas Covarrubias C.; León Robles, N.; López-León, S. CUADERNOS DE PSICOANALISIS, 43, 2010.
- Aspectos psicosociales de la depresión. Con Sandra López León. CUADERNOS DE PSICOANALISIS, Enero-Junio de 2011, Volumen XLIV,44, 2011.
- Medication in children and adolescents in the United States in the year 2004 vs 2014. With López León, S.; Warner, B.; Ruiter-López, L. DARU JOURNAL OF PHARMACEUTICAL SCIENCES, 2018.
