= Luis MacGregor Krieger =

Mexican architect

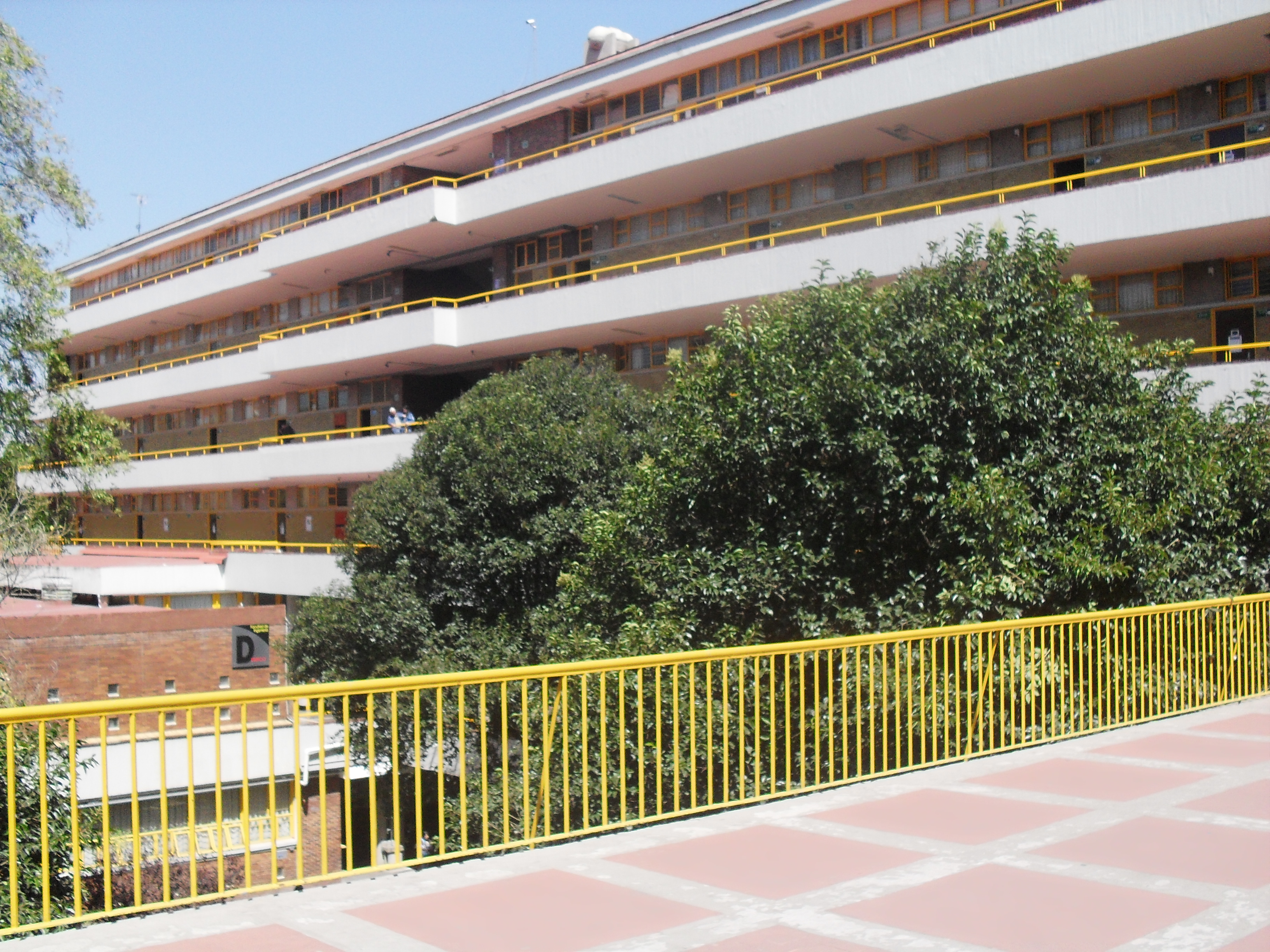
Faculty of Engineering (UNAM) at the Ciudad Universitaria (UNAM "University City"), Mexico City

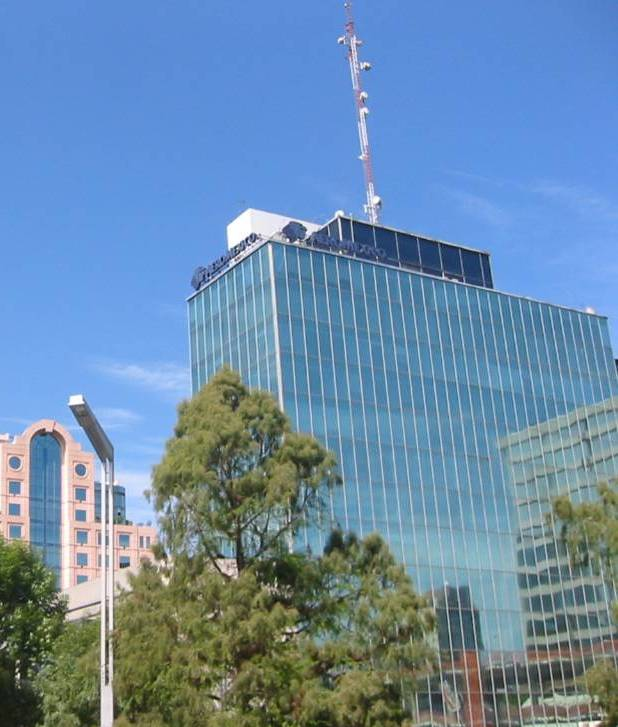
Edificio Centro Olímpico (later Aeroméxico headquarters, razed 2018)

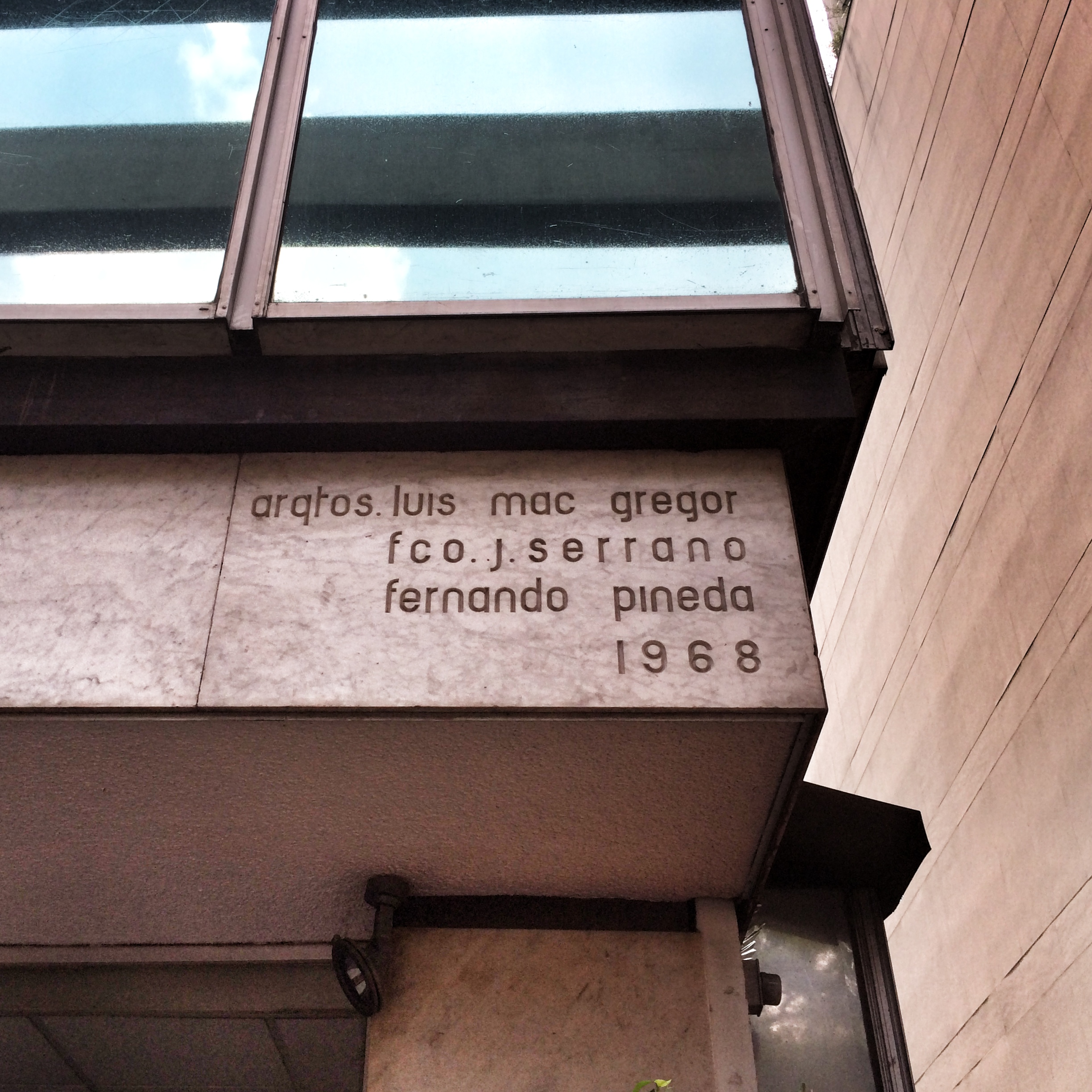
Edificio Centro Olímpico (later Aeroméxico headquarters, razed 2018)

Luis Alberto MacGregor Krieger (1918–1997) was a Mexican architect, son of architect, Luis MacGregor Cevallos. He is also the grandfather of Mexican architect Augusto Rodelo Mac Gregor. He was a professor for a period of time at the Universidad Iberoamericana in Mexico City. One of his first projects was the design and construction of a small museum for the archeological site of Cuicuilco in southern Mexico City, which still stands and operates today. His predominant architectural style was Modernist, with many influences from his contemporaries during the mid-century movement around the world.

== Thesis ==
MacGregor Krieger received his degree in architecture from the UNAM in March 1949. His thesis was a project for a new headquarters for the Instituto Nacional de Antropología e Historia (INAH), where he had worked for several years. At the time the INAH was spread across several buildings: offices at Córdoba 73, the Museo Nacional de Antropología in the old Casa de Moneda on Moneda street, the Museo Nacional de Historia in Chapultepec Castle and the photo lab in the former convent of Churubusco. He looked at three sites: a narrow lot by the Ciudadela that the INAH already owned, the land of the old Colonia railroad station (then set aside for the Monumento a la Madre), and Chapultepec. He chose about 20,000 square metres (4.9 acres) of public parkland at the southeast tip of the triangle formed by Paseo de la Reforma, Mariano Escobedo and Fundición. The complex had an office building on pilotis, a three-story museum facing Reforma, storage and curatorial space, labs, workshops, an auditorium, the school, a library and a radio station. The Aztec calendar stone was to stand in the main lobby, at the end of the entrance axis. He also proposed making the whole triangle a cultural district, with a museum of contemporary art, a museum of popular art, a music center and the Instituto de Bellas Artes, and the zoo across Reforma. He called the project a "first attempt" (primer ensayo) at meeting the INAH's needs.

The new Museo Nacional de Antropología, designed by Pedro Ramírez Vázquez, was later built nearby in the Chapultepec park on Reforma, between January 1963 and September 1964.

== Works ==
- Faculty of Engineering (UNAM)) at the Ciudad Universitaria (UNAM "University City"), Mexico City (collaboration with Francisco J. Serrano and Fernando Pineda), 1953
- Edificio Centro Olímpico (1967–8, together with Francisco J. Serrano and Fernando Pineda), later headquarters of Aeromexico, razed 2018, Paseo de la Reforma 445, Mexico City. Set to be demolished in 2017.
- General Servando Canales International Airport in Matamoros, Tamaulipas
- Cuicuilco Site Museum, Cuicuilco archeological site, Tlalpan borough, Mexico City
- Parque Agrícola de la Ciudad de México (plan, 1930), Mexico City
- Hospital Central Militar Mexico (1940)
- A garden at Chapultepec Castle in which a sculpture, La Madre Patria, commemorating the Niños Héroes, is located (1924; sculptor Ignacio Asúnsolo)
- Palenque Camp and Museum
- (Book) Huejotzingo: The City and the Franciscan Monastery (1934)
- (Book) Actopan (1955)
