= Diego García Miravete =

Mexican gridiron football coach and player (born 1946)

Biographical details
- Born: 20 August 1946 (age 80); Mexico City, Mexico
- Education: National Autonomous University of Mexico (UNAM)

Playing career
- 1966–1969: Pumas UNAM
- 1970–1971: Cóndores UNAM
- Position: Defensive end

Coaching career (HC unless noted)
- 1973–1975: Cóndores UNAM (assistant)
- 1976–1993: Cóndores UNAM
- 1995: Cardinals Palermo
- 1995–1999: Auténticos Tigres UANL
- 2000: Badalona Drags
- 2000–2005: Borregos Salvajes Toluca
- 2006: Corsari Palermo
- 2007–2009: Linces UVM (assistant)
- 2010–2014: Borregos Salvajes Santa Fe

Accomplishments and honors

Championships
- As player: 3 national (1966, 1967, 1970); As head coach: 9 national (1978–1980, 1983–1986, 1990, 1991)

Awards
- 10× ONEFA Coach of the Year
Medal record
Men's American football
Head coach for Mexico
NFL Global Junior Championship
| Gold medal – first place | 1997 New Orleans | Team |
| Gold medal – first place | 1998 Chula Vista | Team |
| Silver medal – second place | 1999 Fort Lauderdale | Team |

Diego Leonardo García Miravete (born 20 August 1946) is a Mexican former gridiron football coach and player. He is best known as the head coach of the Cóndores UNAM from 1976 to 1993. During his 18-year tenure as the team's head coach, he amassed nine national championships, tying Roberto "Tapatío" Méndez for the most in Mexican college football history.

García Miravete also served as head coach of the Auténticos Tigres UANL, the Borregos Salvajes Toluca, and the Borregos Salvajes Santa Fe, as well as stints with the Cardinals Palermo and Corsari Palermo in Italy and the Badalona Drags in Spain. He coached the Mexico junior national team in international competitions as well. He played college football for the Pumas UNAM and the Cóndores UNAM from 1966 to 1971, winning three national championships during the height of popularity of the sport in Mexico.

García Miravete was inducted into the Mexican Hall of Fame of American Football in 2017.

== Early life and playing career ==
Diego Leonardo García Miravete was born on 20 August 1946 in Mexico City. He was exposed to football from an early age since his father played the sport as a guard. As a seven-year-old child in 1952, García Miravete was taken by his father to the inauguration of the Estadio Olímpico Universitario, where he witnessed the Clásico Poli-Universidad rivalry game that sparked his interest in the sport. He attended Escuela Nacional Preparatoria 5 for high school, where he first played organized football at the age of 15, though he suffered a broken clavicle during his first training session and missed the entire season as a result. García Miravete grew from 1.68 m (5 ft 6 in) to 1.82 m (6 ft 0 in) ahead of the next season, eventually becoming a starter.

He enrolled at the National Autonomous University of Mexico (UNAM) School of Engineering and joined their team, Escorpiones Rojos, for the intermedia category (20 and under). However, soon afterwards, García Miravete switched to the School of Accounting's team, the Gallos, at the suggestion of legendary coach Manuel Neri Fernández, who coached the UNAM Liga Mayor (college) team. By his second year in intermedia in 1966, he was invited to join the Pumas Dorados in Liga Mayor. García Miravete always wanted to play quarterback, but was assigned to be a defensive end.

García Miravete played college football for the Pumas Dorados under Neri from 1966 to 1969, a time when football was popular in Mexico, and the team enjoyed a national spotlight. García Miravete helped his team win back-to-back national championships in his first two seasons before the 1968 season was cancelled due to widespread student protests and the resulting Tlatelolco massacre. The Pumas had trouble finding opponents to play in 1969 – resorting to an international schedule – and were split into three teams the following year.

Like many other ex-Pumas, García Miravete followed coach Neri to the newly-created Cóndores UNAM, where he played his final two seasons. Listed at 1.87 m (6 ft 2 in) and 78 kg (172 lb), he helped the team win the national championship in 1970 and was chosen by his teammates as the team captain in 1971. UNAM football games for all three teams were closely monitored by the government due to the sport's popularity among students and the university's central role in the protests. García Miravete later told Bleacher Report that rowdy spectators were planted in stadiums in an effort to crack down on the student movement. This marked the start of a decline in popularity for college football in Mexico. While in college, García Miravete was selected to represent the Mexican All-Stars in the Aztec Bowl against American teams in 1966, 1970, and 1971, with the game being cancelled from 1967 to 1969.

== Coaching career ==
=== Cóndores UNAM ===
"There's really nowhere to learn coaching American football in Mexico. So, the only real way to learn football is watching their clinics and practices, and taking our film for their coaches to critique."

— García Miravete on his motivation to study football under American coaches

After his playing career, García Miravete worked two years for Cuauhtémoc Moctezuma Brewery before he was asked by his former coach, Manuel Neri Fernández, to return to the Cóndores UNAM in an assistant coaching role in 1973. He was promoted from defensive line coach to the head coaching position in 1976 after Neri Fernández accepted a job at the Universidad Autónoma Metropolitana (UAM). García Miravete was prepared to resign and follow Neri Fernández to UAM, but was asked by his players to stay and lead the team.

As head coach, he revamped the coaching staff, implemented new schemes, updated the logo and uniforms, and instituted team rules to begin building a distinct culture. In his coaching debut, García Miravete guided the Cóndores to a surprise 24–24 tie with the defending national champion Pieles Rojas de Acción Deportiva. He also led the combined UNAM selection to a blowout win over the combined Instituto Politécnico Nacional selection in the annual Clásico Poli-Universidad and was named the ONEFA Coach of the Year for the first time.

In his second season at the helm in 1977, García Miravete decided to contact the University of Tennessee coaching staff due to the fact that their new head coach, Johnny Majors, had led Pittsburgh to a national title the year before. He got in touch with Tennessee assistant Joe Avezzano, who knew some Spanish and invited the Cóndores coaching staff to Knoxville, Tennessee, to observe their spring practices. The UNAM coaches returned to Tennessee the next two springs and twice hosted the Tennessee coaches at their own spring practices in Mexico City. García Miravete and his coaching staff cultivated such a strong relationship with Avezzano that, when he was hired as the Oregon State head coach in 1980, the Cóndores coaches attended spring training in Corvallis, Oregon, that year instead of making a fourth straight trip to Knoxville.

García Miravete went on to visit coaches like Don James at Washington, Jackie Sherrill at Texas A&M, Gary Barnett at Colorado, June Jones at SMU, and Lou Holtz at Notre Dame, and credits Avezzano for opening the doors for him.

"We have millions of people who watch the National Football League. People in the metropolis probably know more about the Dallas Cowboys or the Los Angeles Rams than their own Mexican college teams."

— García Miravete on the state of football in Mexico in 1987

García Miravete led the Cóndores UNAM to nine ONEFA national championships, building a dynasty known for "their option attack, an aggressive, hard-hitting defense and a deep and talented squad", according to the El Paso Times. They won three in a row from 1978 to 1980 and four in a row from 1983 to 1986, followed by back-to-back titles in 1990 and 1991. He opposed player recruitment and athletic scholarships.

García Miravete and the team developed the mantra "no puedo dejar de ganar" (I cannot stop winning). He explained that it meant that they would enjoy championships only on the day of the final and be ready to return to offseason practices the following January with the goal of getting even better. At the same time, García Miravete encouraged his players to unwind in the lead-up to gameday, such as with team volleyball matches the day before or listening to rock and roll in the locker room pre-game.

In 1992, García Miravete was described as "one of the more popular sports figures in Mexico" by the Chadron Record ahead of a game against Chadron State.

=== Post-UNAM career ===
After leaving the Cóndores following a poor 1993 season, García Miravete served as head coach of Italian second-tier team Cardinals Palermo in 1995, leading them to an appearance in the playoff semi-finals. He returned to Mexico later that year and took the reins of the Auténticos Tigres UANL for five seasons from 1995 to 1999, resigning after compiling an overall record of 17–23. In 2000, García Miravete served as head coach of the Badalona Drags in Spain; the team signed eight Mexican players and competed in the European Football League under his direction. Later that year, he was hired as head coach of the Borregos Salvajes Toluca, who had just won promotion to the top-tier Conferencia de los 10 Grandes. García Miravete led the program to five straight playoff appearances from 2001 to 2005, but they lost in the semi-finals each time. In six seasons at the helm, he directed the team to a 33–21 record. García Miravete resigned following the 2005 season.

In March 2006, García Miravete was presented as the new head coach of Italian side Corsari Palermo, members of the second-tier Serie A2 NFLI. After just three practice sessions, he led the team to a 34–25 win over local derby rivals Sharks Palermo a few days later. Despite fielding an unexperienced team with many rookies, García Miravete helped the Corsari advance to the league semi-finals, where they lost in overtime to the Skorpions Varese. He then returned to Mexico and served as an assistant for the Linces UVM under head coach Rafael Duk from 2007 to 2009. He was named the head coach of the Borregos Salvajes Campus Santa Fe in May 2010, serving in the role for five seasons from 2010 to 2014. The team reached the CONADEIP playoffs in 2011 and 2012 before recording back-to-back losing seasons.

In 2018, García Miravete attempted to start a football program at the Autonomous University of Aguascalientes. Despite starting the project at the invitation of the school's administration, it was scrapped after a month. García Miravete stayed in the area, however, to help a former Cóndores UNAM player who was coaching a youth team called the Sharks de Aguascalientes.

=== National team ===
García Miravete served as head coach of the Mexican All-Stars in the Aztec Bowl in 1984, 1986, 1990, and 1991, registering wins over Tarleton State in 1984 and Southwestern Oklahoma State in 1991. He also led the Mexico junior national team at the first three editions of the NFL Global Junior Championship in 1997, 1998, and 1999. Mexico won the first two titles before losing in the final in 1999.

García Miravete was named head coach of the Mexico national university team for the 2014 World University Championship held in Sweden. However, he declined the opportunity due to prior commitments and was replaced by Horacio García.

== Legacy ==
As a college football head coach, García Miravete won nine national championships, tying Roberto "Tapatío" Méndez for the most in Mexican history. The record was tied by Jacinto Licea the following year and was eventually surpassed by Frank González. García Miravete was named by González as one of his three coaching idols (alongside Licea and Manuel Neri Fernández) and was called the Vince Lombardi of Mexican college football by Joe Avezzano. Ahead of the 2022 ONEFA season, at the 95th anniversary celebration of UNAM football, García Miravete was honored along with Licea and González as the winningest coaches in Mexican college football history.

García Miravete is a member of the Mexican Hall of Fame of American Football. In 2010, he was awarded the Premio Luchador Olmeca by the Confederación Deportiva Mexicana.

== Personal life ==
While in college, García Miravete was an employee of Cuauhtémoc Moctezuma Brewery, designing the packaging. He graduated with a degree in industrial engineering. During his time as head coach of the Cóndores, García Miravete served as a full-time professor at UNAM while supervising youth football leagues year-round. He married in 1968 and had a son that year. García Miravete coached two of his sons, Diego and César, in football. His nicknames include Lapizote (big pencil) and Flaco (skinny one), and his favorite NFL team is the Dallas Cowboys.

== Bibliography ==
- Pérez Ocampo, Víctor Manuel (2024). Leyendas de los Emparrillados (in Spanish). Vol. V. Talleres Lira Impresos.
