= California Odha Zertuche Díaz =

Mexican civil engineer

- Born: 1923; Ensenada, Mexico
- Died: 1991 (aged 67–68); Ensenada, Mexico
- Occupation: Civil engineer
- Known for: Forjadora de Baja California Award

California Odha Zertuche Díaz (1923–1991) was a Mexican civil engineer and is credited as the primary developer of the drinking water and sewerage system in Ensenada, Mexico.

== Early life and education ==
Zertuche Díaz was born in 1923 in the port city of Ensenada, in the Mexican state of Baja California on the Pacific coast, about 110km (65 miles) south of the country's border with the United States.

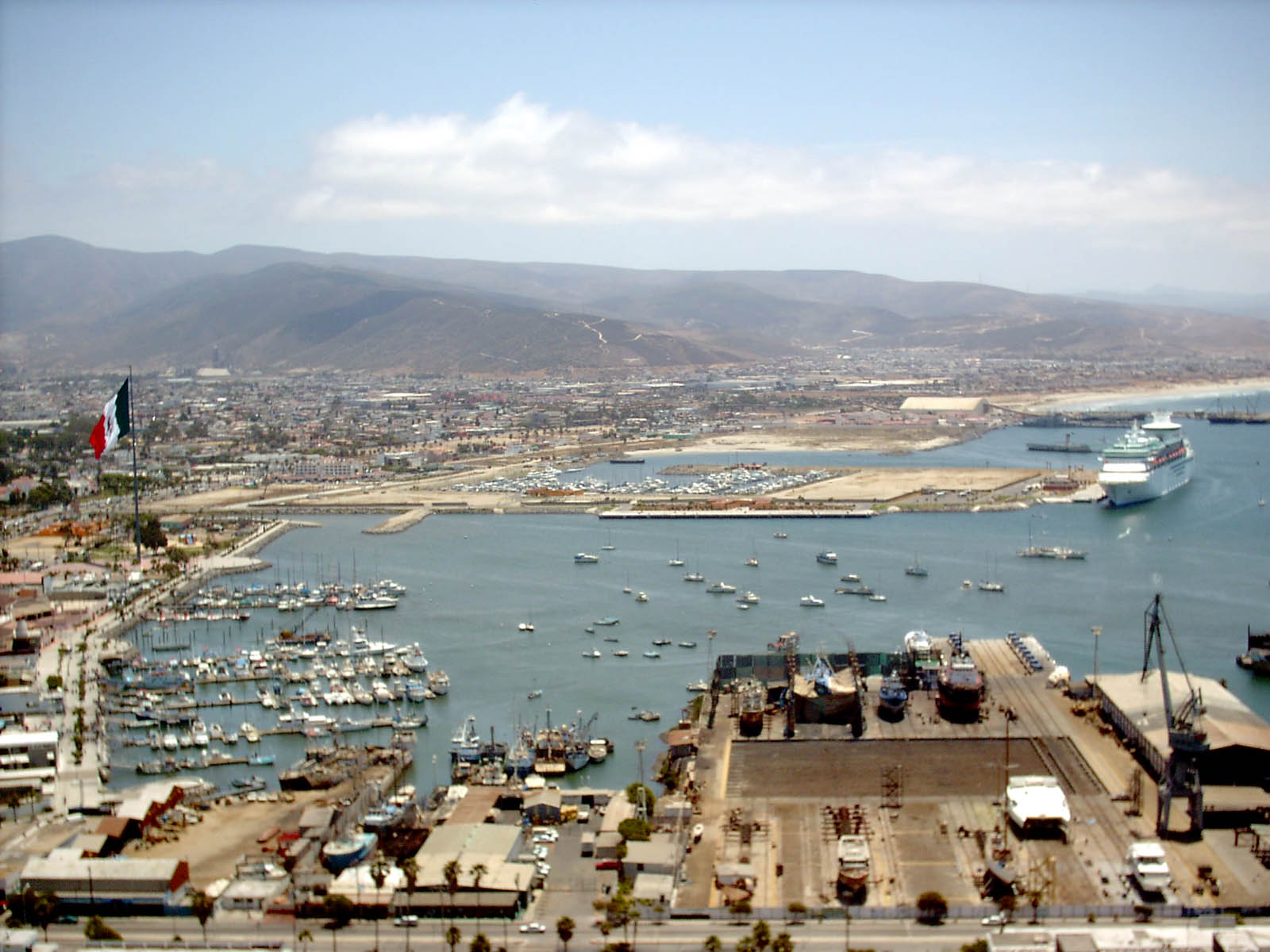
Ensenada, Baja California

She is cited as the first woman to graduate from the UNAM School of Engineering, in 1954, with a thesis titled Project of sewerage of the Ensenada population. Díaz was the 12th woman to earn a civil engineering degree in the country and "probably the first engineer in Ensenada." She was a founding teacher at the Autonomous University of Baja California (UABC), created in 1957, and its School of Marine Sciences, founded in 1960.

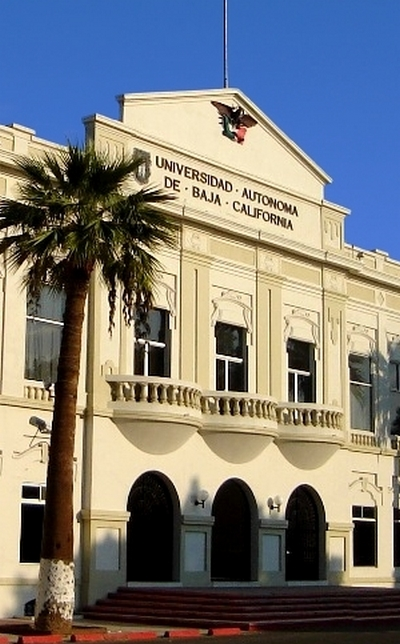
California Odha Zertuche Díaz was founding teacher of the UABC

== Career ==
Zertuche Díaz worked in the Secretariat of Hydraulic Resources where she became the main developer for the installation of Ensenada's water infrastructure. The city's historical water management challenge was complex because there are no rivers in the municipality. Its main supply comes from groundwater from the Maneadero Valley and when it rains very hard the contours of the land cause some streams to form. The municipality has four bodies of water, which contribute to the drinking water: the Hidden Lagoon, the Emilio López Zamora Dam fed by the Valle Verde stream, the Hanson lagoon, located within the Constitution Park of 1857 and La Lagunita, north of the Ciprés military air base.

In later years, Zertuche Díaz donated property and land for the Sports City and different university schools, in conjunction with Marcos Mario Díaz Zertuche and Lorenzo Cárdenas Zertuche. She also founded the Association of Women Professionals of Baja California as well as the Red Cross in Ensenada.

California Odha Zertuche Díaz died in 1991 in Ensenada.

== Honors ==
On International Women's Day in 2014, Zertuche Díaz received the award "Forjadora de Baja California" ("Forger of Baja California") because her work “allowed the development of the drinking water and sewerage network in the city” of Ensenada. At the same ceremony, Antonia Brenner from Tijuana, María Concepción López Vargas from Tecate, María Luisa Chabert Uriarte from Playas de Rosarito and Gloria Rosado Cásares from Mexicali all received the same tribute for their work in their respective region. For each woman, a portrait and a small biography are displayed on a wall of the la Sala de Mujeres Forjadoras room in the Legislative Power building of the State Congress.
