= Francisco J. Serrano =

Mexican architect (1900–1982)

- Born: March 12, 1900; Mexico City
- Died: December 3, 1982 (aged 82); Mexico City
- Education: Universidad Nacional Autónoma de México
- Occupation: Architect

Francisco J. Serrano y Alvarez de la Rosa (March 12, 1900 in Mexico City – December 3, 1982 in Mexico City) was a Mexican civil engineer and architect.

Serrano studied civil engineering and afterwards architecture at the Universidad Nacional Autónoma de México (UNAM), where later taught as professor of civil engineering and architecture, and researched influences of climatic phenomenons on architecture. His son J. Francisco Serrano Cacho became also a notable architect.

== Works ==
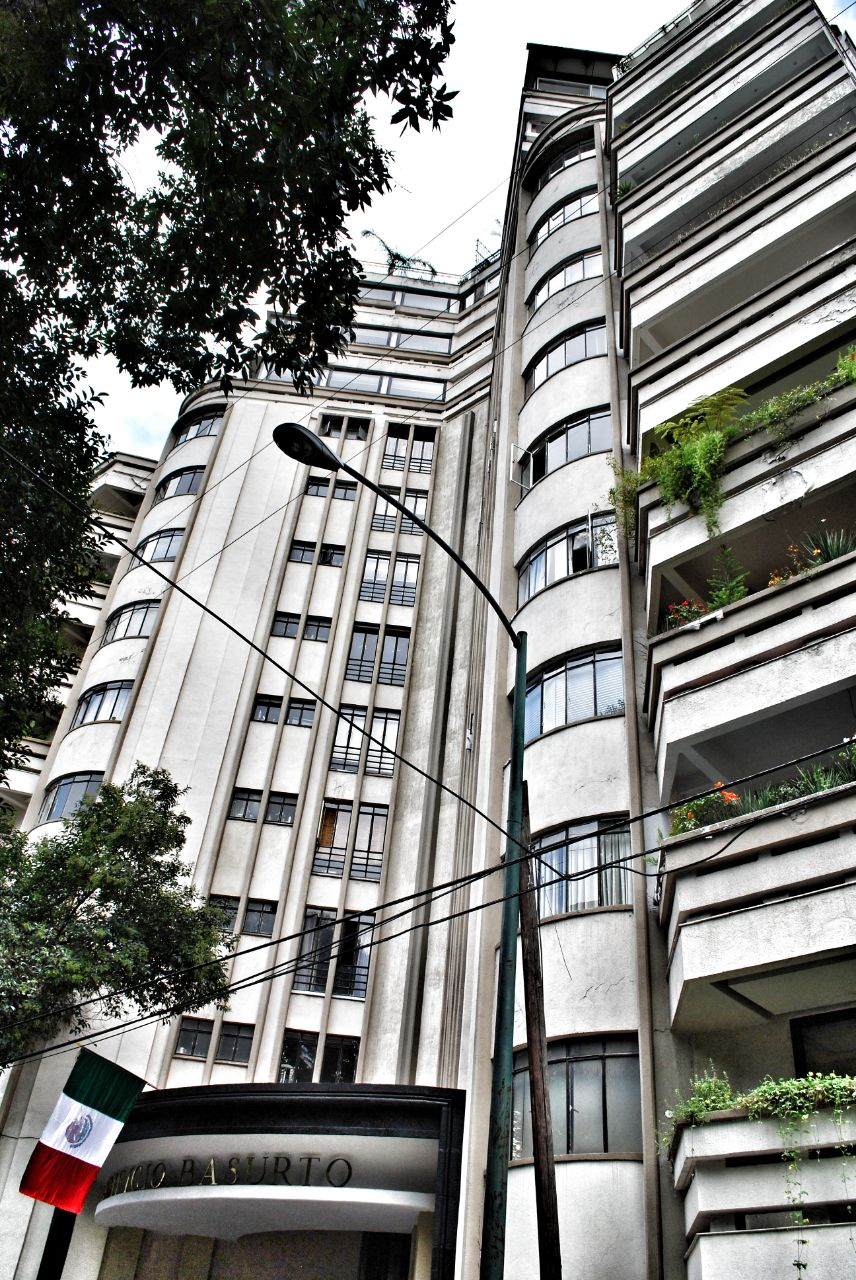
Edificio Basurto

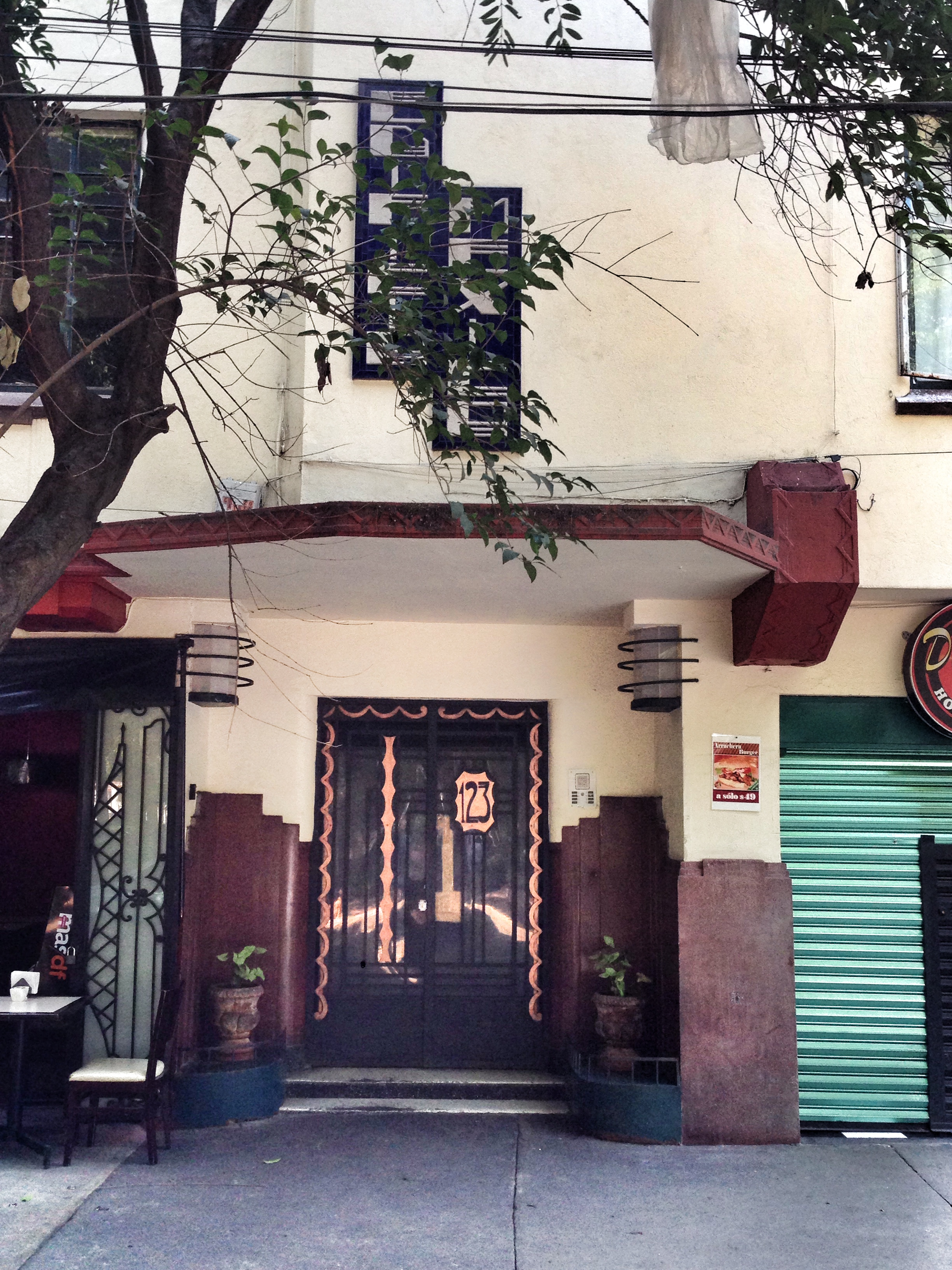
Edificio México

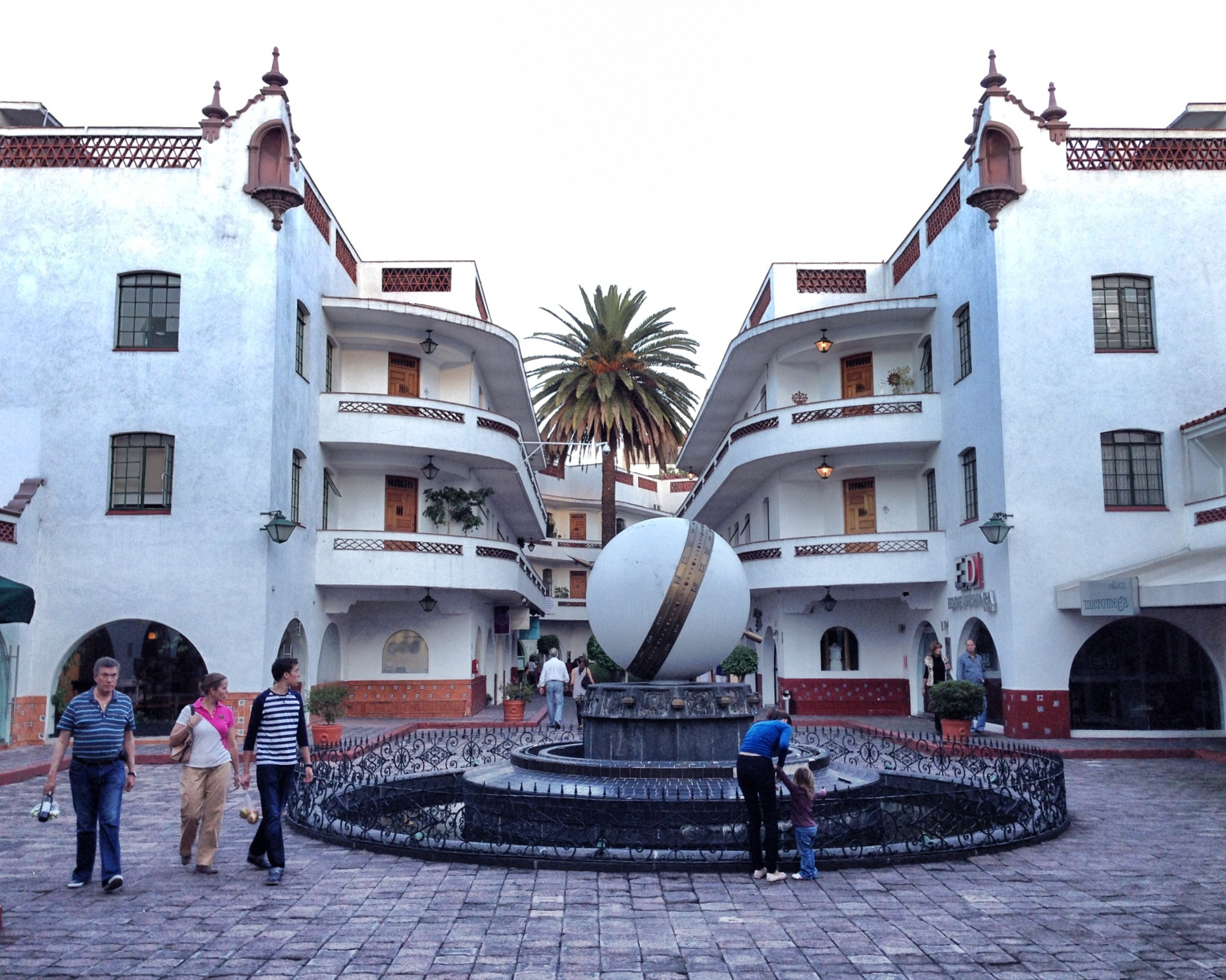
Pasaje Polanco a.k.a. Pasaje Comercial along Avenida Presidente Masaryk in the Polanquito district of Polanco, built in 1938 in Colonial Californiano style

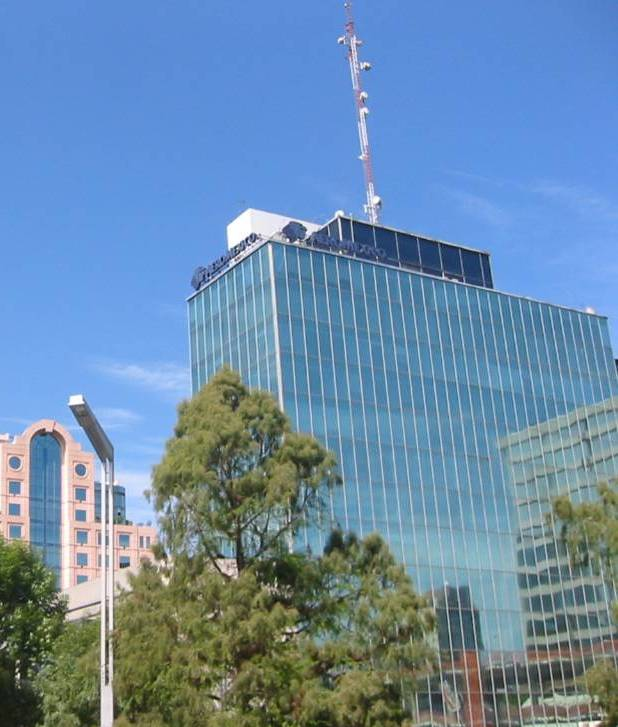
Edificio Centro Olímpico/Former Aeroméxico Headquarters Building

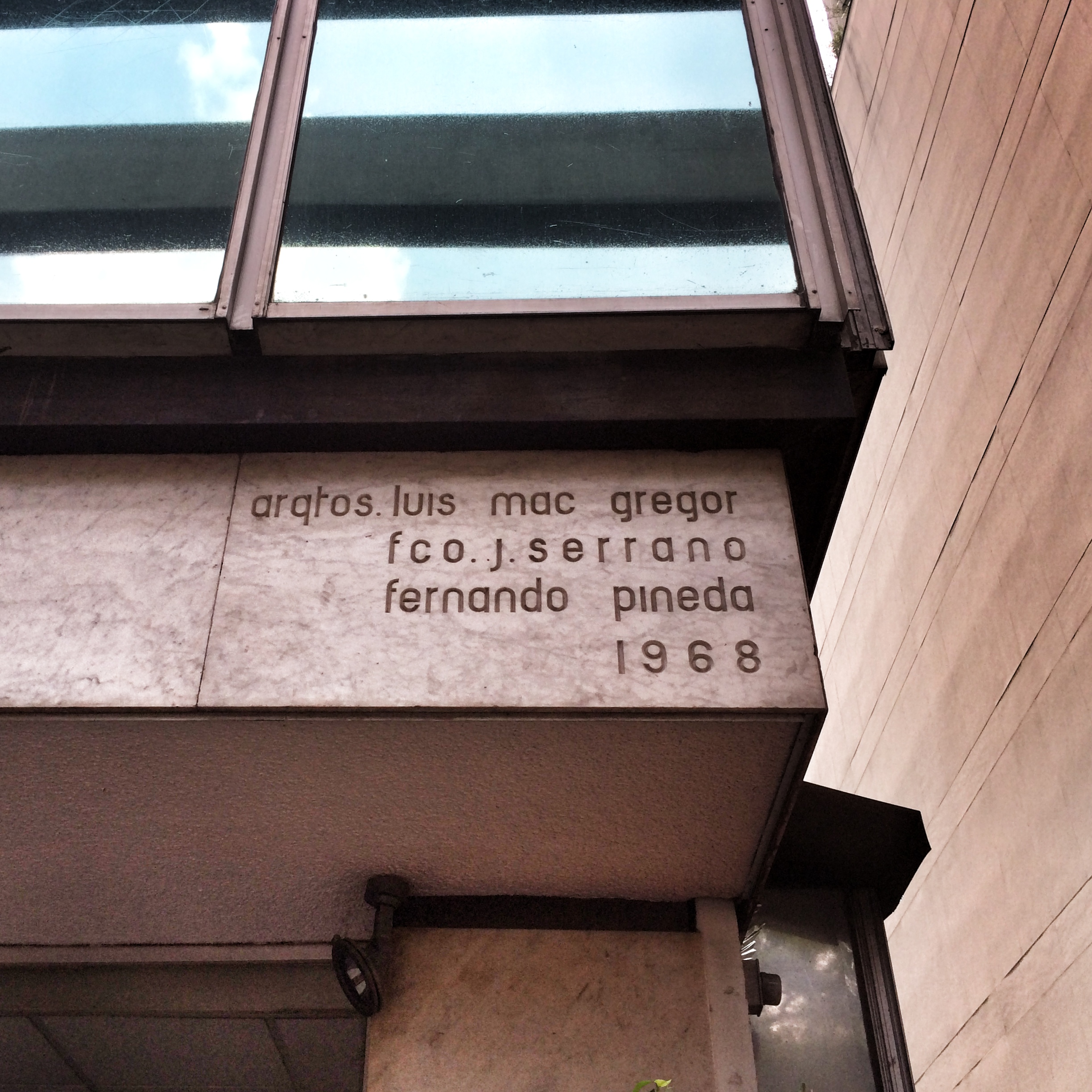
Nameplate at Edificio Centro Olímpico/Former Aeroméxico Headquarters Building

=== Buildings in Condesa, Mexico City ===
- Edificio Basurto (1942-1945),
- Edificio México (1932)
- Laredo 5 (1933)
- Laredo 22 (1942, 1971, 1985)
- Nuevo León 68 (1952)
- Cine Plaza (Auditorio Plaza, 1952-1973), corner of Nuevo León, Tamaulipas, and Juan Escutia, with Fernando Pineda
- Edificio Confort
- Edificio Royalty, Av. Nuevo León 120 at Ozuluama (1936)
- Edificio ACRO (1937), corner of Insurgentes and Quintana Roo
- Edificio Insurgentes or Glorieta (1938), corner of Insurgentes and Chilpancingo
- Chilpancingo 39
- Edificio "Casas Jardínes" (1928-1930), Amsterdam 285 corner of Sonora

=== Other buildings ===
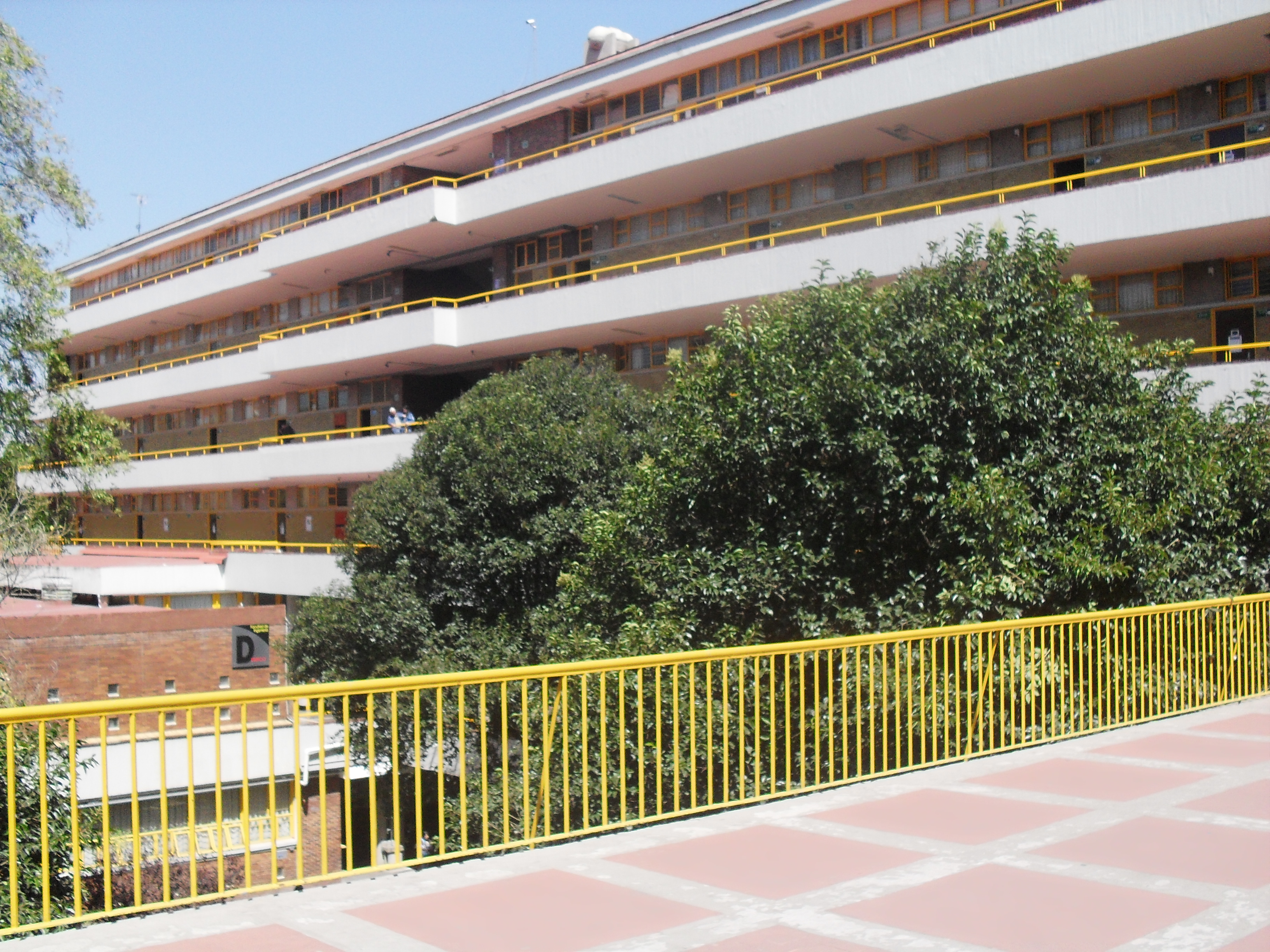
Faculty of Engineering (UNAM) at the Ciudad Universitaria (UNAM "University City"), Mexico City (collaboration with Fernando Pineda and Luis MacGregor Krieger), 1953

- Pasaje Polanco, originally called Pasaje Comercial, Polanco
- Faculty of Engineering (UNAM) at the Ciudad Universitaria (UNAM "University City"), Mexico City (with Fernando Pineda and Luis MacGregor Krieger), 1953
- Edificio Centro Olímpico/Former Aeroméxico Headquarters Building (1967-8 with Luis MacGregor Krieger and Fernando Pineda), razed 2018, Paseo de la Reforma 445, Mexico City
- Cine Teresa Eje Central Lázaro Cárdenas 109, Centro Histórico (1942)
