= Miravete =

Miravete is the name of several towns in Spain:

- Miravete de la Sierra a town in the province of Teruel, Aragón
- Casas de Miravete, a town in the province of Cáceres, Extremadura
- Miravet, a town in Catalonia
- The last name Miravete is a rare last name and more commonly in Mexico and in the United States as of 2025.There are approximately 100-150 people worldwide with the last name.
  - Diego García Miravete, Mexican gridiron football coach
