= Equestrian statue of Emiliano Zapata (Los Angeles) =

Monument in Los Angeles, California, U.S.

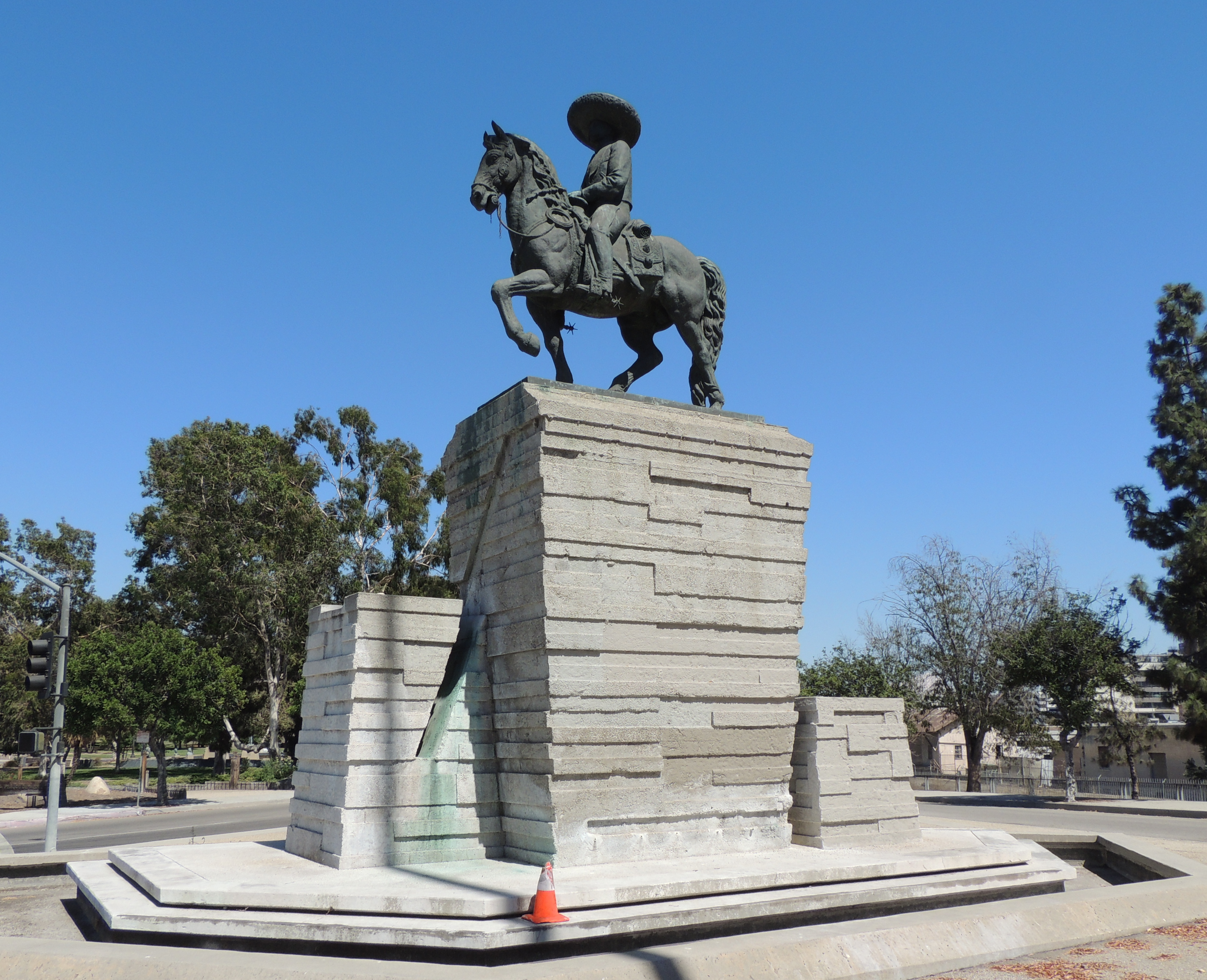
- Artist: Ignacio Asúnsolo
- Year: 1980
- Subject: Emiliano Zapata
- Location: El Parque de México, Lincoln Park, Los Angeles, California, U.S.; 34.065303°N 118.207234°W

The equestrian statue of Emiliano Zapata, honoring Mexican Revolution leader Emiliano Zapata, is installed at El Parque de México, located in Lincoln Park, in Los Angeles, California, United States.

== History ==
The statue was sculpted by Mexican artist Ignacio Asúnsolo. The monument was a gift of Mexico City to the city of Los Angeles and erected in 1980 at El Parque de México, a section of LA's Lincoln Park devoted to Mexican historical figures.

== Inscription ==
The inscription on the monument, in both Spanish and English, reads:

Spanish

NACIÓ EN ANENCUILCO Y MURIÓ ASESINADO EN
CHINAMECA, MORELOSS. COMBATIÓ EN EL MOVIMENTO
REVOLUCIONARIO DE 1910, AL FRENTE DEL EJÉRCITO
LIBERTADOR DEL CENTRO Y DEL SUR. PROCLAMÓ
LA VOLUNTAD DE LOS CAMPESINOS, DE ENTRAR EN
POSESIÓN DE LA TIERRA, MEDIANTE EL PLAN DE
AYALA; BASE PARA EL PROCESO DE REFORMA
AGRARIA EN MÉXICO.

REGALO DE LA CD. DE MÉXICO A LA CD. DE LOS ÀNGELES 1980.

English

BORN IN ANENCUILCO AND MURDERED IN
CHINAMECA, MORELOS. GENERAL COMMANDER OF
THE EJÉRCITO LIBERTADOR DEL CENTRO Y DEL
SUR, THROUGHOUT THE 1910 MEXICAN REVOLUTION.
HE LED THE FARMERS MOVEMENT FOR TAKING
THE LAND ON, BY PROCLAIMING THE PLAN DE
AYALA; FUNDAMENTAL PRINCIPLE TO THE LAND
IMPROVEMENT IN MEXICO.

GIFT FROM MEXICO CITY TO THE CITY OF LOS ANGELES 1980.
