= Luis MacGregor Cevallos =

Luis MacGregor Cevallos (1887–1965) was a Mexican architect and a co-author of a book on Colonial Mexican architecture.

His son Luis MacGregor Krieger was also an architect.

== Architectural works ==
MacGregor was known for buildings of Modern architecture.

- MacGregor designed the garden at Chapultepec Castle in which a sculpture, La Madre Patria, commemorating the Niños Héroes, is located (1924; sculptor Ignacio Asúnsolo; note this is not the better-known, larger monument to the Niños Héroes, Altar a la Patria)
- Parque Agrícola de la Ciudad de México (plan, 1930), Mexico City
- Hospital Central Militar Mexico (1940)
- Palenque camp and museum
- Restoration works at the Convent at San Agustín de Acolman

== Books ==
MacGregor's books included:

- Huejotzingo: The City and the Franciscan Monastery (1934), with Rafael García Granados
- Actopan (1955)
