= Edificio México =

Building in Mexico City

Coordinates: 19.4104°N 99.1694°W

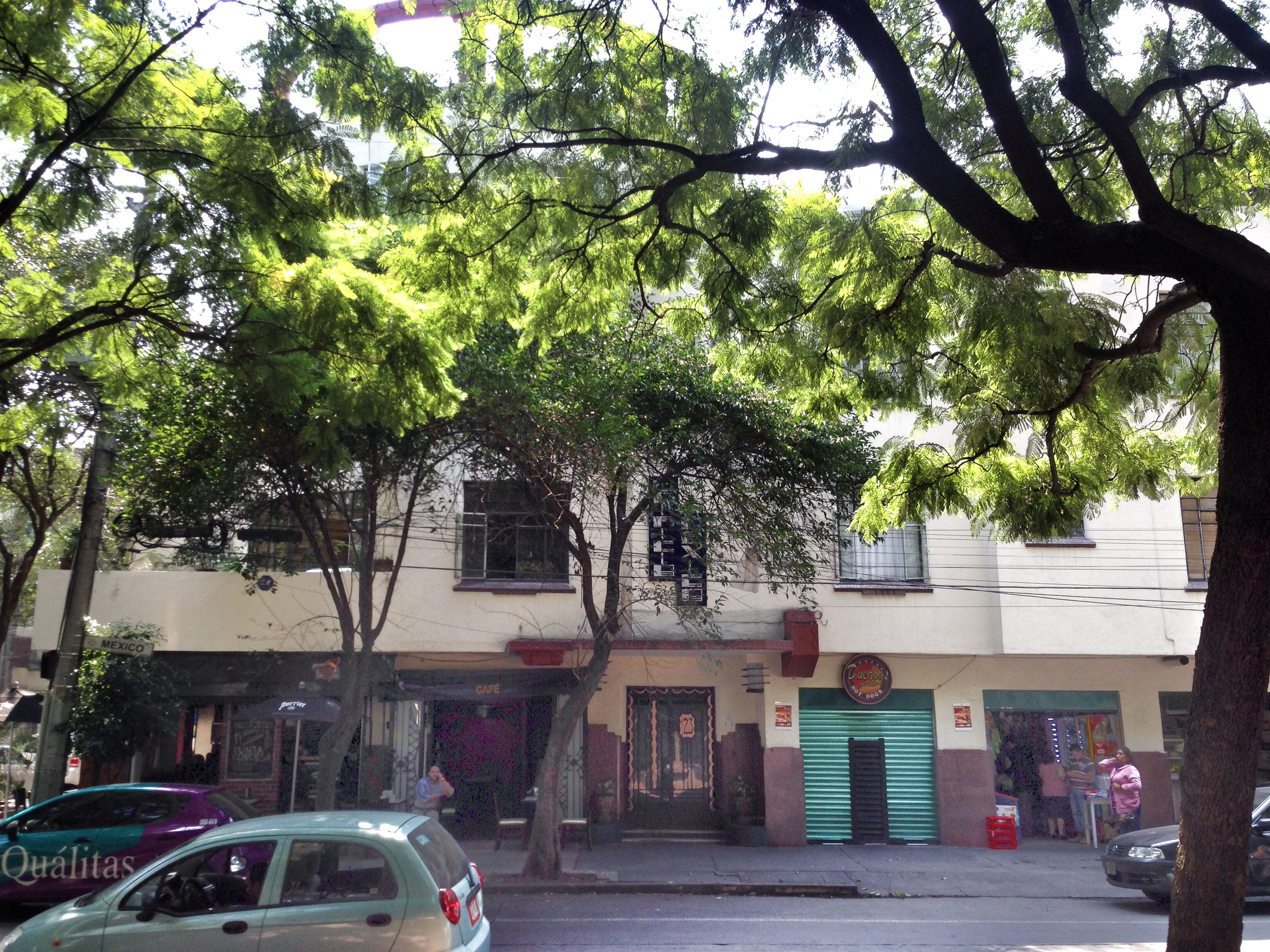
Front view from Avenida México

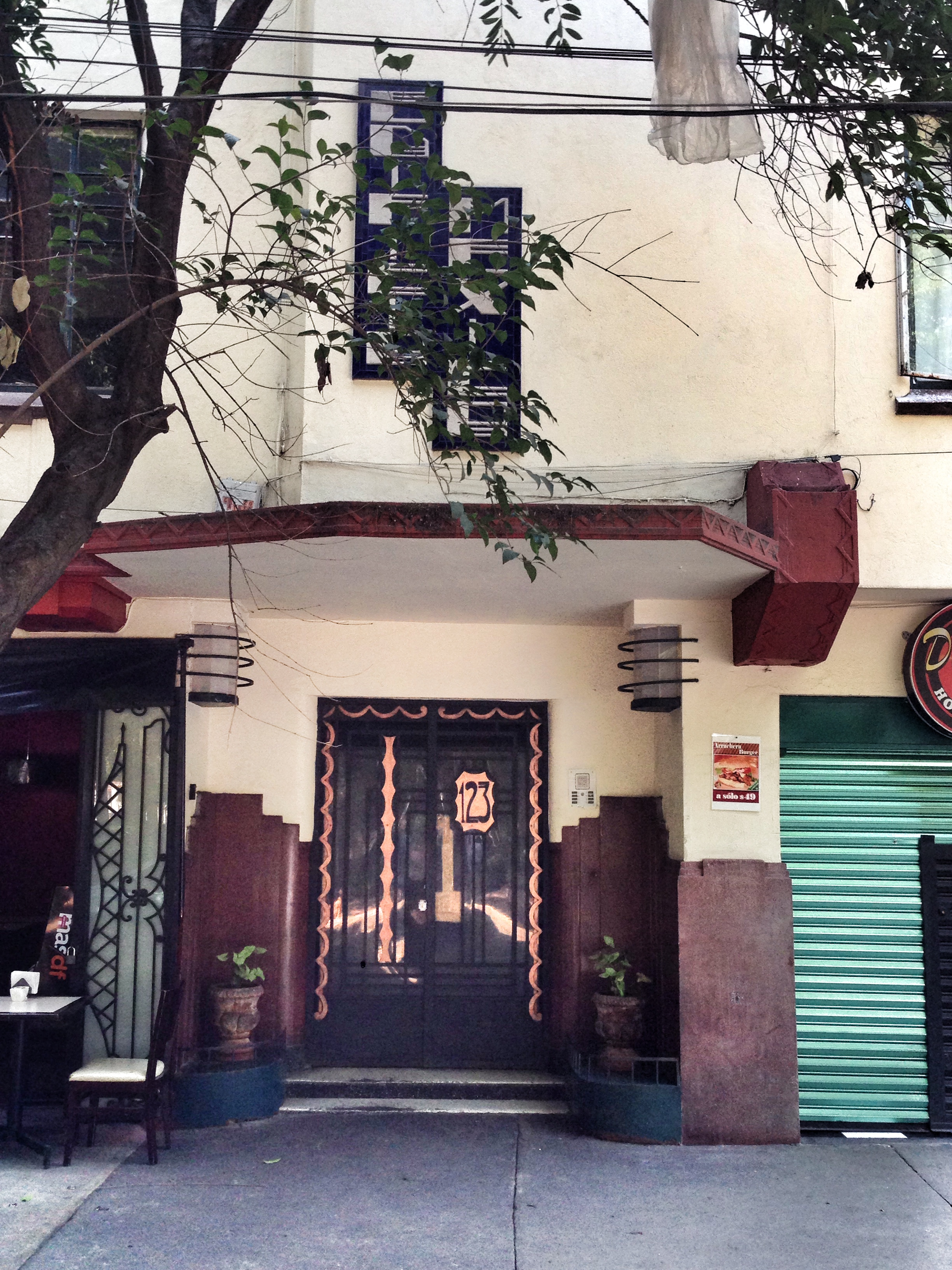
Entrance

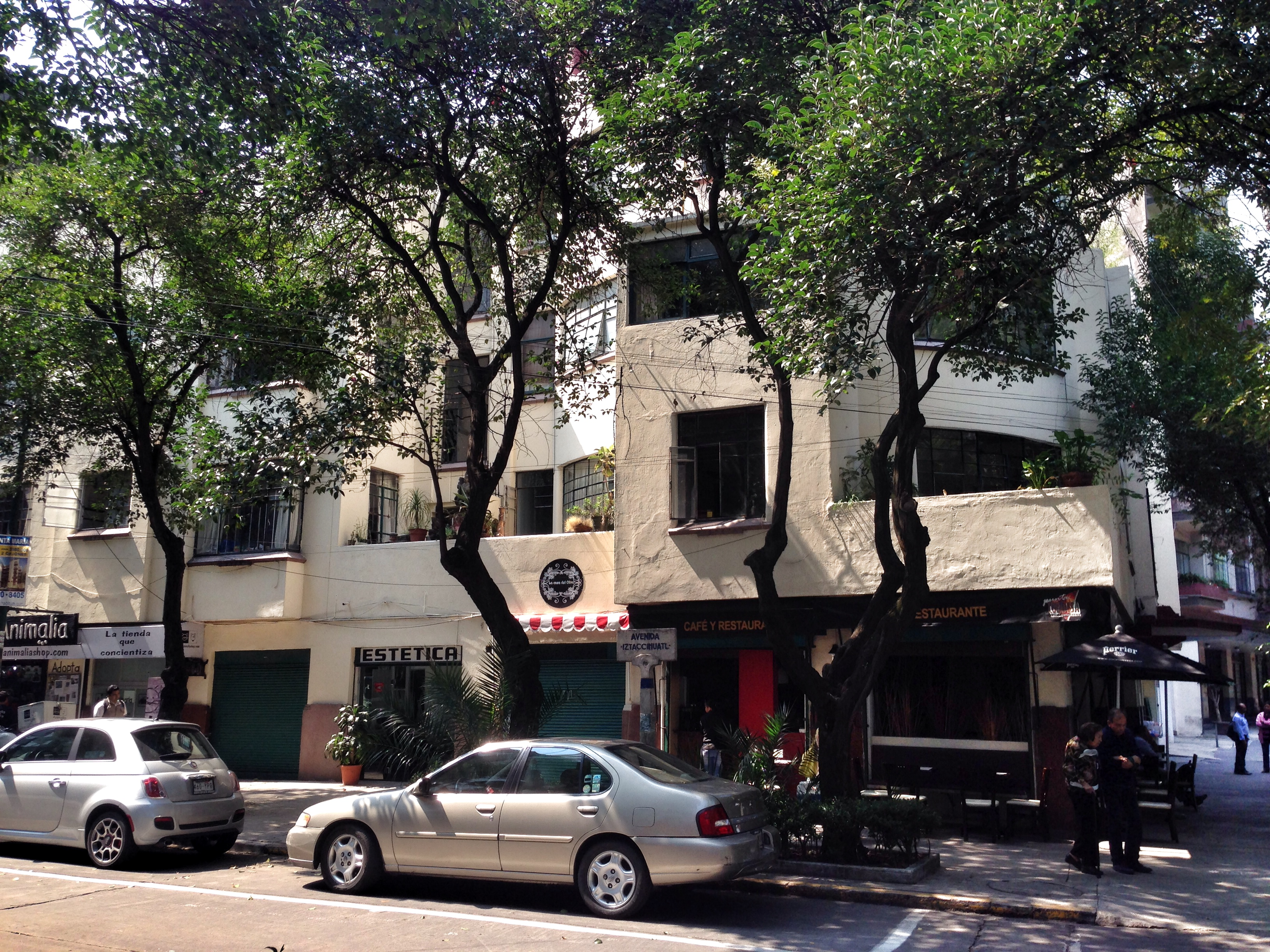
Side view from Avenida Ixtaccíhuatl

Edificio Serrano is a 1932 art deco residential building at 123 Avenida México in colonia Hipódromo in the Condesa area of Mexico City. The architect was Francisco J. Serrano.

Author Marisol Flores notes that the building was unconventional for the time, thus reflecting modernity, due to the incorporation of curves (whereas previously rooms were nearly always rectangular), as well as American elements such as closets, a roof garden and foyers.
