= Former Aeroméxico Headquarters Building =

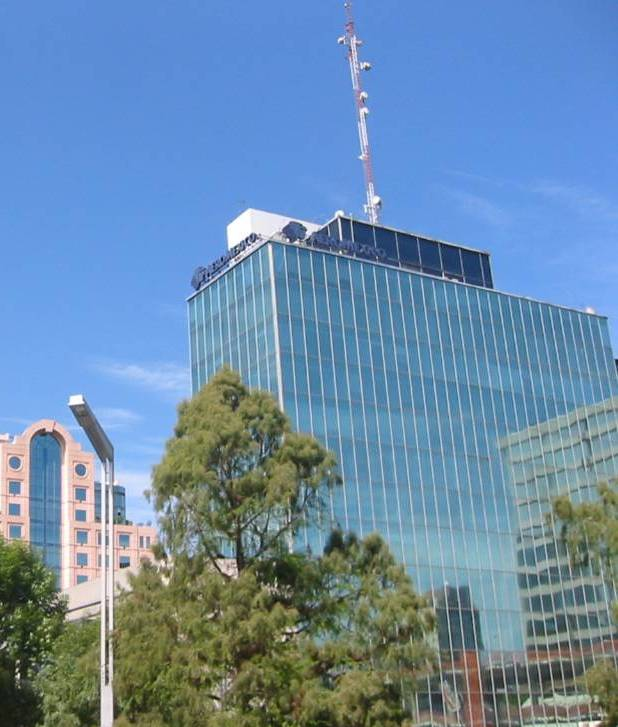

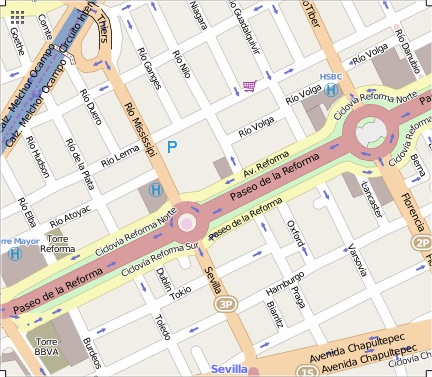
- Location within Mexico City Reforma Angel to Diana
- Former names: Aeromexico Headquarters Building, Edificio Centro Olímpico ("Olympic Center Building")

General information
- Status: Completed
- Location: Paseo de la Reforma 445, Colonia Cuauhtémoc, Mexico City, Mexico
- Coordinates: 19.425377°N 99.1725283°W
- Current tenants: none (were Aeroméxico, Club Premier)
- Completed: 1968
- Closed: 2017
- Demolished: 2018
- Owner: Aeroméxico

Height
- Height: 50 metres (160 ft)

Technical details
- Floor count: 13

Design and construction
- Architects: Fernando Pineda, Francisco J. Serrano, Luis MacGregor Krieger

References
- Emporis page

The former Aeromexico headquarters building, also known as Edificio Centro Olímpico ("Olympic Center Building"), was located in the financial district of Mexico City on Paseo de la Reforma overlooking the Diana the Huntress fountain in the Colonia Cuauhtémoc neighborhood. It was built in 1967, designed by Fernando Pineda, Francisco J. Serrano, and Luis MacGregor Krieger.

In May 2017 it was announced that the building would be demolished and a new, taller tower would be built on its and neighboring lots. In October 2017, Aeromexico moved its corporate staff to the Torre MAPFRE at Paseo de la Reforma 243, and other locations. The intention at the time was that the business staff would return to a portion of the new tower once it was built.

== Gallery ==
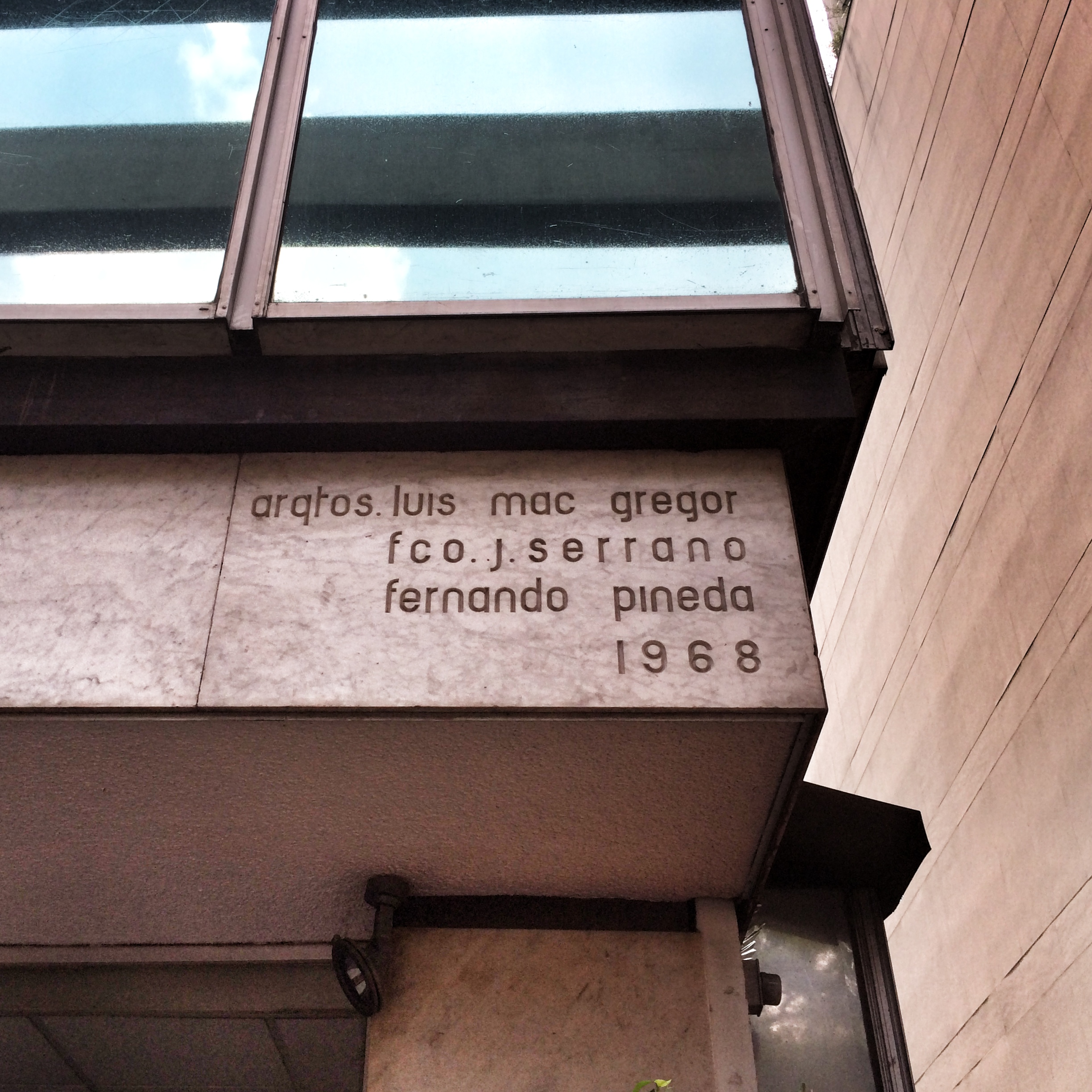
Edificio Centro Olímpico (now Aeroméxico headquarters)

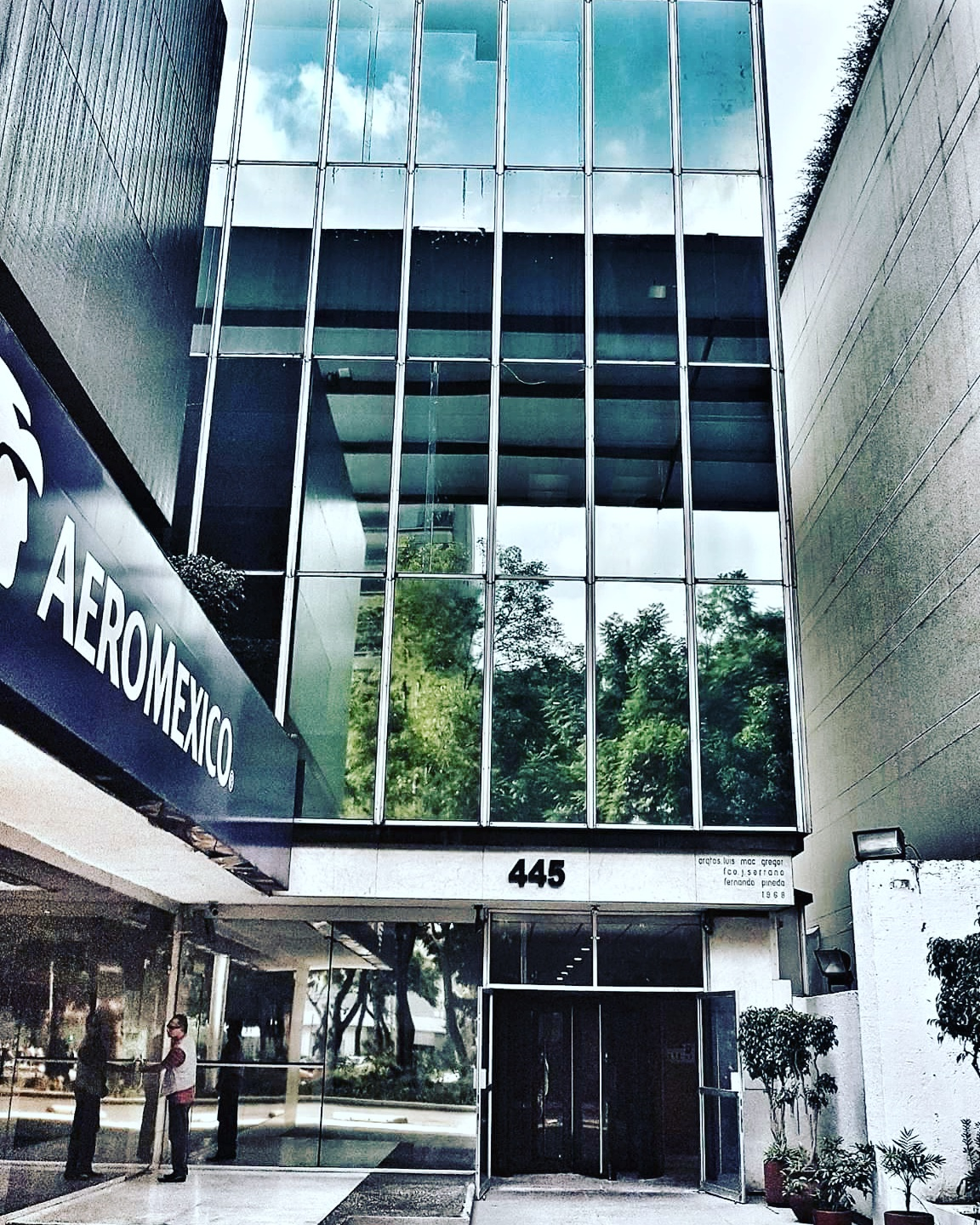
Entrance from Paseo de la Reforma
