= Ignacio Asúnsolo =

Mexican artist (1890–1965)

Ignacio Asúnsolo (1890–1965) was a Mexican sculptor trained in France.

== Early life ==
Ignacio Asúnsolo was born on March 15, 1890, in the Hacienda de San Juan Bautista ranch in the state of Durango, Mexico. He was the son of Fernando Asúnsolo and Carmen Mason Bustamante. His family moved to Hidalgo de Parral in the state of Chihuahua, where at age 6 he starts modelling clay, an art his mother practised. By 1904 he was studying at the Scientific and Literary Institute of Chihuahua. In 1908 he entered the National Institute of Fine Arts and Literature where he was awarded his first professorship.

== Mexican revolution ==
Asúnsolo participated in the Mexican revolution from 1913 to 1917, mainly through artistic expression. In 1915, because of a temporary shutdown of the National Institute of Fine Arts, he went back to Chihuahua to teach sculpting at the Scientific and Literary Institute. He returned to Mexico City by 1918.

== Studies in Europe and return to Mexico ==
In 1919, he was awarded a scholarship which allowed him to go to Europe to enhance his skills. In France he studied at Paris' L'Ecole des Beaux-Arts and met Mireille Marthe Barany, whom he married on June 23, 1921. At his return to Mexico, secretary of public education José Vasconcelos invited him to be part of his cultural project, where he makes his first grand format sculptures at the Secretariat's central courtyard. By 1922 he had the sculpting professorship of the National Institute of Fine Arts, and he was awarded the project for the making of the Monumento a la Patria, at the Pérgolas Garden of the Chapultepec Castle. Direction of ENAP and creation of the Civil Association of Mexican Sculptors From 1949 he served as Director of the ENAP (now Faculty of Arts and Design). Five years later, he is reunited with many Mexican sculptors including Francisco Marín, Luis Albarrán y Pliego, Federico Canessi, and Ernesto Tamariz; the intention being to form a society protecting the interests of Mexican sculptors without interfering with the authentic foreign values that were introduced into Mexican culture by the works of Francisco Zúñiga and Rodrigo Arenas Betancourt. The Civil Association of Mexican Sculptors is created in February and Asúnsolo is appointed general secretary.

== Death ==
Ignacio Asúnsolo died at 10:30 a.m. on December 22, 1965, suffering from a cardiac arrest. His funeral was attended by important characters such as David Alfaro Siqueiros, Rufino Tamayo, Miguel Alemán, Justino Fernández, and Guadalupe Rivera Marín, among others. All along his career, Asúnsolo showed a style influenced by classical art and his mentors Maillol, Mariano Benlliure, Mateo Inurria, Auguste Rodin, Arnulfo Domínguez Bello, and Enrique Guerra, among others. He acquired many of these ideas while he lived in Europe. He was an adept of Formalism.

== Works ==
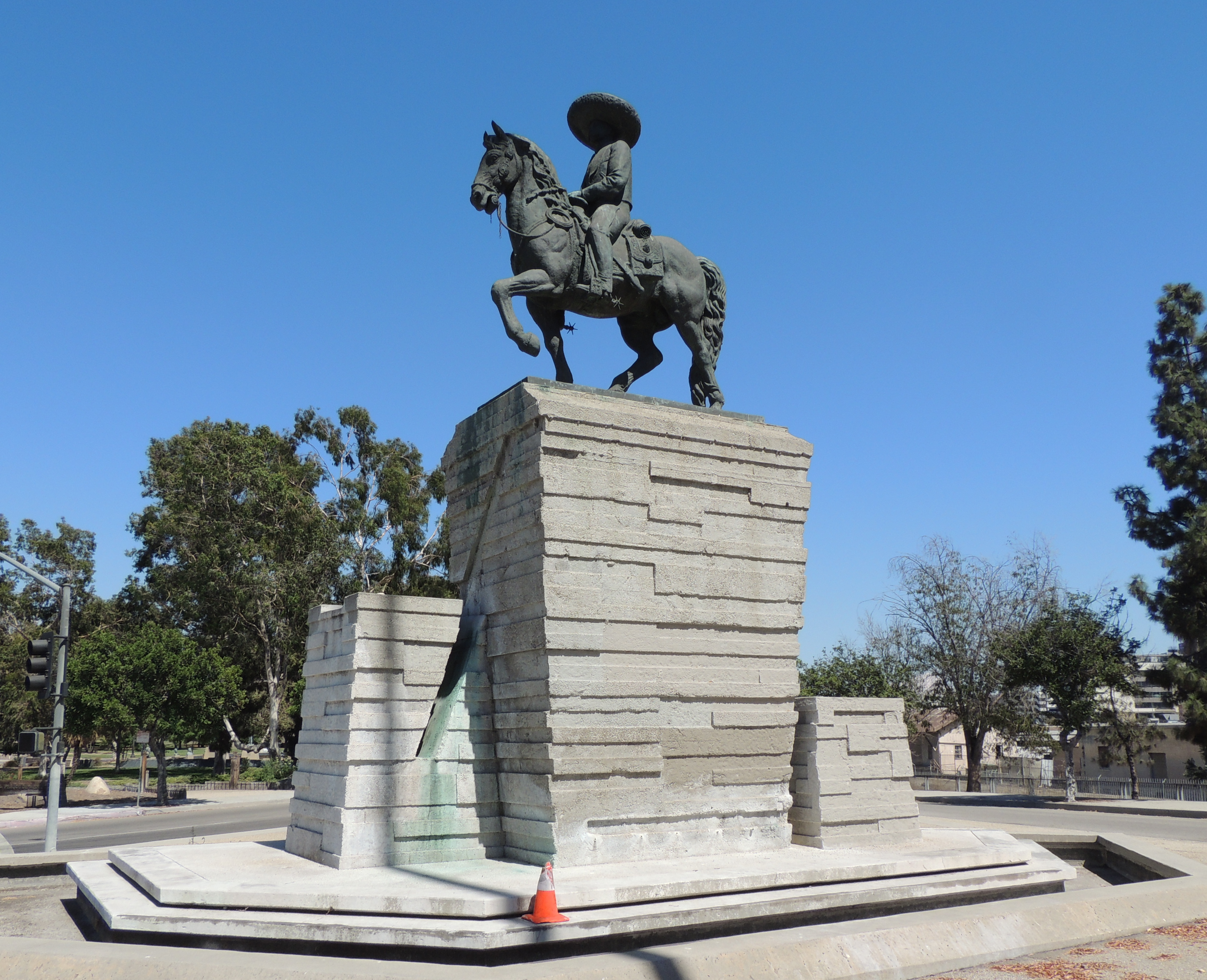
The Equestrian statue of Emiliano Zapata in Los Angeles, California.

- Justo Sierra portrait bust (1945)
- Sketch for a monument to Fray Juan de Zumarraga Figure (1949) Villa de Guadalupe
- Sketch for a monument to the mother figure Hermosillo, Sonora
- Sculpture commemorating the Niños Héroes (1924; architect Luis MacGregor; note this is not the main, large monument)

=== Clay ===
- Figure Sentenced
- Sketch for a monument to the North Division equestrian figure (1956) Chihuahua, Chihuahua

=== Stone ===
- Talk to figure centuries (1960)
- Mexican Indian head

=== Bronze ===
- Portrait of sculptor German Cueto (1923)
- Portrait of Guadalupe Marin (1930)
- Portrait of Alberto J. Pani (1933)
- The proletarian family (1934)
- Otomi Child (1936)
- Otomi Indian Tragedy (1936)
- Estrellita (1936)
- Portrait of Enrique González Martínez (1936)
- Soldier (1937)
- The Poet (1938)
- Portrait of Liza (1939)
- Portrait of Ana Ma Artigas (1941)

== See also ==
- List of Mexican artists
