= School of Sciences, UNAM =

Coordinates: 19.3244114°N 99.1791499°W

Faculty of Sciences
- Facultad de Ciencias
- Hallmark of the UNAM's Faculty of Sciences
- Type: Faculty
- Established: 1938
- Parent institution: Universidad Nacional Autónoma de México
- Director: Luis Felipe Jiménez García
- Students: 9,578
- Undergraduates: 6,799
- Postgraduates: 2,779
- Address: Av. Universidad 3000, Circuito Exterior s/n Alcaldía Coyoacán, CP 04510 Ciudad Universitaria, CDMX, México., Mexico City, Mexico City, Mexico
- Language: Spanish
- Colors: Blue and white
- Website: www.fciencias.unam.mx

The Faculty of Sciences (Spanish: Facultad de Ciencias) at the National Autonomous University of Mexico (UNAM) is the entity where natural and exact science-based majors are taught. It has both undergraduate and graduate studies, some of the former in joint teaching with other faculties, most commonly the Faculty of Engineering.

The Faculty of Sciences is the most important science school in the country by the number of students and the quality of its research. Together with the research institutes that surround it, it is one of the biggest research complexes of the UNAM.

== History ==
The history of this faculty is rather different from that of other schools that have their origins in former national schools. The study plan for this faculty was initially given in the Philosophy Faculty of the UNAM. The Biology major was the first one to have a structured study plan, originating around 1930.

It was not until 1933 that the majors of Physics and Mathematics were founded.

Formerly, the faculty was located in a small building between the Faculty of Engineering and Medicine. Due to an increasing number of students, in 1977 the Faculty had to relocate to a new area in the outer zone of Ciudad Universitaria, conveniently located among the research science institutes of Mathematics, Astronomy and Physics.

This faculty, along with Philosophy, is notable for its history of activism during the 1999 UNAM Strike; these two faculties alone kept the strike going longer than any other school.

== Organization & Departments ==
The faculty is run by the Faculty Director, currently Luis Felipe Jiménez García.

It has 3 main divisions:

- Biology:
  - This area covers the bachelor's degree in Biology, Environmental Sciences, and currently researches over Evolutionary Biology, Comparative Biology, Cell Biology and Ecology & Natural Resources.
- Physics:
  - This area is in charge of the bachelor's degree of Physics, Biomedical Physics and Earth Science. Further research is done at the Institute of Physics and the Institute of Engineering.
- Mathematics:
  - This area currently offers bachelor's degrees in Applied Mathematics, Mathematics, Computer Science and Actuarial Science.

== Location and facilities ==
The faculty is located in Ciudad Universitaria in Mexico City, across the street from the Faculty of Engineering and the Faculty of Administration. Its premises are located next to the Physics, Mathematics and Astronomy research institutes.

The faculty occupies various buildings: buildings, "O" and "P", composed only of classrooms; buildings lodging the Faculty's departments for Physics, Mathematics, and two buildings for Biology; building Amoxcalli, which holds the faculty's library and computing center; building Tlahuizcalpan which hosts various labs and research premises, as well as classrooms; building Yellizcalli which hosts various classrooms; and building Tlaltipac which hosts research lab Lansbiodyt and classrooms. It hosts the Alberto Barajas Celis auditorium where conferences are held, as well as two other minor venues. There's a student-ran cafeteria, a small sports area and a workshop.

In recent years, an interdisciplinary extension of the Faculty was inaugurated in the port of Sisal, Yucatán, devoted to the research of coastal ecosystems and their species.

The National Herbarium of Mexico at UNAM in Mexico City houses the largest collection of plant specimens in all of Latin America and is one of the 10 most active herbaria in the world.

== Graduate programs ==
The Faculty of Sciences offers graduate programs on computer science, material science, astronomy, biology, earth science, ocean science, physics, mathematics, statistics & actuarial science, history and philosophy of science and science education, although most of these are run in collaboration with the nearby institutes, like Physics, Mathematics and IIMAS (Institute for Applied Mathematics and Systems). Some programs are offered in conjunction with other faculties and institutes nationwide.
