= Hospital Central Militar Mexico =

Military hospital in Mexico City

Geography
- Location: Mexico
- Coordinates: 19.4374°N 99.2162°W

Links
- Lists: Hospitals in Mexico

Central Military Hospital is a third level medical institution, highly specialized, with extensive experience, that provides services not only to military and rights holders, but also to people outside this medical unit, which belongs to and depends directly from the Secretaría De La Defensa Nacional (SEDENA) through the Directorate General of Health. Within the ladder Health Services is located on the highest level, also has 48 medical specialties.

== History ==
The history of the Central Military Hospital began in the twentieth century when the land belonging to the Hacienda San Juan De Dios (named after the founder of the Order of Friars hospital), were purchased by the Lord Jesus and Tornel Goribar giving structure to a vast expanse of farmland and your child exploitation around the year ended 1885 selling the pair Eduardo Rubio and Ana Cuevas Lascurain. The place ended up becoming the Anzures colony fractions and expansion, it is noteworthy that only the first and second fraction, and the third would be used to create colonies that currently found in the Federal District, and part of the premises where is currently National Defense. Later, Mr. Cuevas sold the land to the Chapultepec Heights subdivision, although in the early twentieth century heritage flourished, achieving olive oil bottling olive production in the "Sotelo hill ".

After various representations expressed, to government agencies, are considered the building of the National Universal Mexico in those areas, but due to war conditions that arose during the presidency of General Lazaro Cardenas in 1938, plus incentives government to strengthen military structures (particularly the medical care of the armed forces), the land became property of the minister of defense, and the street formerly known as "Calzada de los Morales", it became the Avenue of the National Mexican Army. Within the southern boundary of the land, right in front of the brick and the limits of the river, facilities were built like the Central Military Hospital. The construction of the institution was by architect Luis MacGregor and a list of other advisors, highlighting the American Medical Association and the Ministry of Defense of the United States. The medical unit construction began on March 25, 1942, and was until December 1, 1945, when then President Manuel Avila Camacho accompanied by the Director of Military Health, inaugurated the health building for the Mexican Military Medical School.

== Objectives ==
The primary objectives of the medical institution are:

- Decreasing the rate of mortality.
- Decreased morbidity.
- The increase in minimally invasive surgical procedures.
- The Improving social and environmental programs.
- Increase the level of maturity of the System of Quality Management.
- The expansion of the training program coverage.
- Overcoming the level of patient satisfaction.
