= Tecnológico de Monterrey, Campus Santa Fe =

University in Mexico City, Mexico

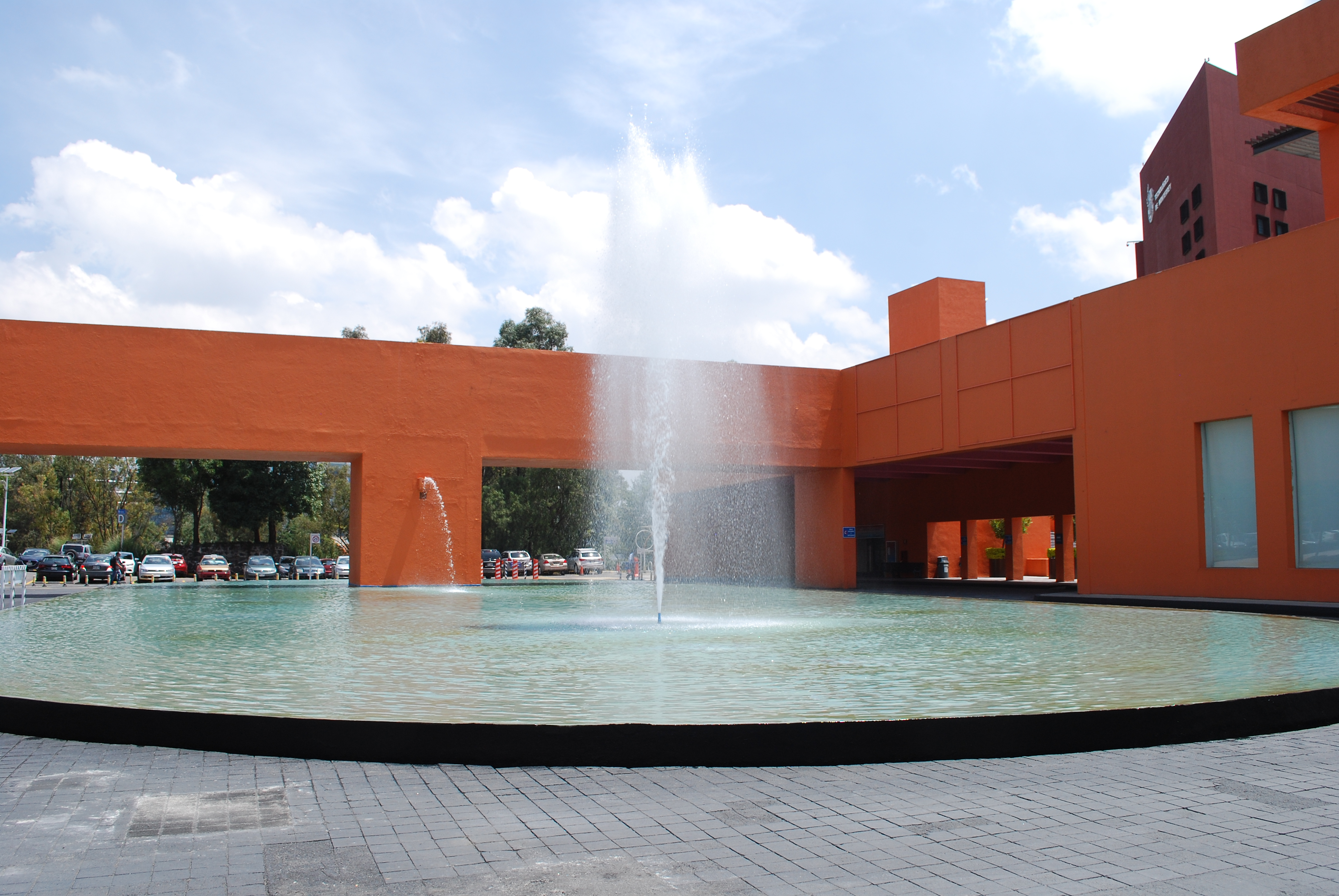
- Established: 2001 (23 years)
- Parent institution: Monterrey Institute of Technology and Higher Education
- Location: Santa Fe, Mexico City, Mexico; 19°21′16.2″N 99°16′20.18″W
- Architect: Ricardo Legorreta
- Mascot: Safee
- Website: csf.itesm.mx

The Monterrey Institute of Technology and Higher Education, Santa Fe Campus (in Spanish: Instituto Tecnológico y de Estudios Superiores de Monterrey, Campus Santa Fe) commonly shortened as Tecnológico de Monterrey, Campus Santa Fe, ITESM Campus Santa Fe or Tec Santa Fe, is a campus of the Monterrey Institute of Technology and Higher Education private university system in Santa Fe, Mexico City, Mexico. It provides professional studies as well as high school programs. International programs are also available. The campus features modern architecture by the renowned Ricardo Legorreta, having more than 30,000 square meters of construction, with more than 3,000 students.

== History ==
The idea to build the 30th campus was formulated in 1997, but the terrain wasn't acquired until 1999. Construction began on March 19, 2001. On October 22, 2001, the first students started moving to the Santa Fe Campus. By the end of its first year, the Campus Santa Fe had 1150 students.

In March 2003, the construction for the preparatory building began.

The campus celebrated its fifth anniversary, having 3023 students, of which 1000 were high school students, 1482 were undergrads and 372 were graduates. The CCA Centro Comunitario de Aprendizaje or Community Learning Center, is currently under construction, and will provide the low-income community around the Santa Fe area a place to access computers and learning material.

== Campus ==
Tec de Monterrey Campus Santa Fe (Monterrey Institute of Technology, Santa Fe Campus) is located in the western edge of Mexico City. Campus Santa Fe started operation in August 2001. Today it has over 3,600 students enrolled in High School, Undergraduate and Graduate Programs. Santa Fe Campus is located in a 13-hectare land (33 acres) it offers a wide range of sports, cultural and leisure facilities, such as a full size football field, basketball, tennis, and volleyball courts; a 1200 m^{2} cafeteria, several "snacks", two libraries, laboratories for science and engineering and computer labs. Free Parking and free transportation to and from most of the main areas of the city is offered to all students. Many cultural and athletic activities are offered free of charge to all the regular and international students.

The campus is divided into three buildings for professional studies and a preparatory building with its own hall, green areas, library and snack bar. The professional area has 3 main halls, an auditorium, a library (one of the biggest libraries in Mexico's universities) and a bookstore, along with an information technologies center featuring 70 computers divided by the type of software installed: Business, Programming, Multimedia, Design. There is a Business center and a Gesell dome used for marketing studies. There are nine engineering laboratories:

- Energy Transfer Laboratory
- Information Technologies Center
- Advanced Control and Industrial Networking Laboratory
- Manufacture and Productivity Integrating Cell
- Mechanics and Metallography Laboratory
- Integral Electronics and Potency Systems Laboratory
- Telecommunications and Instrumentation Laboratory
- Computational Laboratory of Design and Manufacture
- Networks and Informatics Security Laboratory

== Student life ==
Sports

Campus Santa Fe offers a wide range of sports, cultural and leisure facilities, such as a full size football field, basketball, tennis, and volleyball courts.

Culture

The department offers 32 workshops in the following disciplines: Cinematographic appreciation, dancing, ballet, bass, singing, bond, current dancing, Arabic dancing, painting, literature, corporal expression, flamenco, photography, guitar, radio production, locution, and theatre. The campus has the following cultural representative Groups:

- Theatre
- Flamenco
- Musical bond
- Technical and production staff
- They usually hold performances during the academic year.

Student Organizations
Student organizations in campus Santa Fe are widely active and are associated with excellence and relevant events. During the last years, student groups with the University, managed to get conferences by Tony Blair and Howard Shultz, Starbucks CEO.

Student Community
The students' community is integrated from Mexico's upper class, as it's located in the highest wealth area of Mexico, the economic center and place where most international companies' headquarters are located. Current annual tuition and fees are ranked US$20,000, making the Tec Santa Fe one of the most expensive universities in Mexico and Latin America.

== Controversies ==
Access to the campus was blocked when it was under construction by a group of tenants who claimed that they had not been fully compensated for the land by the government.

== Sources ==
- 5 años, Campus Santa Fe, ITESM, Dirección de Comunicación e Imagen y Relación con Egresados de Campus Santa Fe 2006.
