= Emilio López Zamora dam =

Emilio Lopez Zamora dam
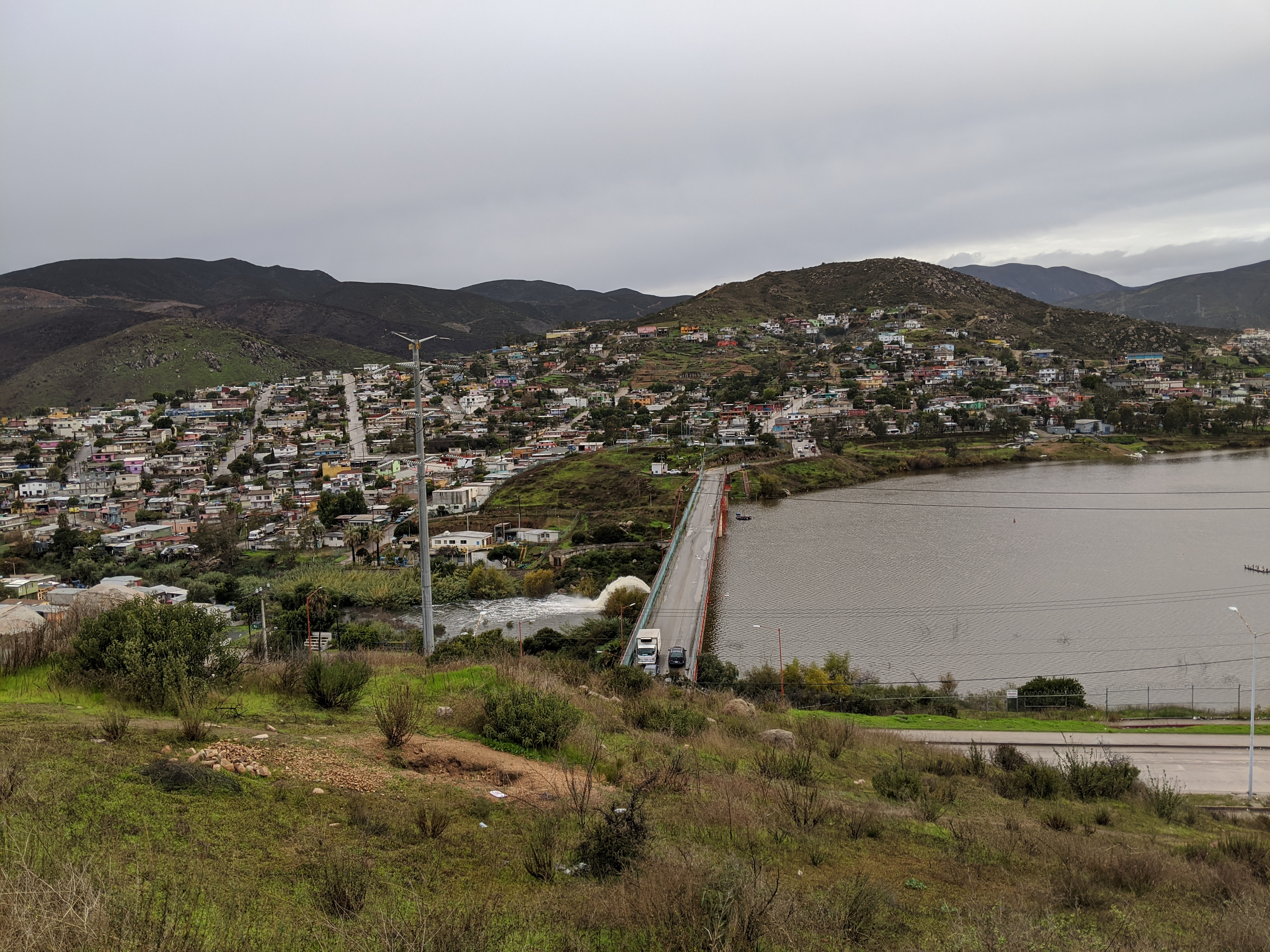
- The dam in December 2019, with the spillway open

- Location within Baja California
- Location: Ensenada, Baja California, Mexico
- Coordinates: 31°53′24″N 116°36′09″W
- Opening date: 1976
- Owner: National Water Commission

Dam and spillways
- Height: 34 m (112 ft)
- Length: 200 m (656 ft)

Reservoir
- Total capacity: 3,750,000 m^{3} (3,040 acre⋅ft)

The Emilio López Zamora dam, also known as the Ensenada dam, is a dam with a water treatment plant in Ensenada, Baja California, Mexico, on the basin of the Ensenada stream. Its main use is the containment of flash floods, and as a water supply for the city. It was built in 1976 and is administered by Mexico's National Water Commission (CONAGUA).

== Characteristics ==
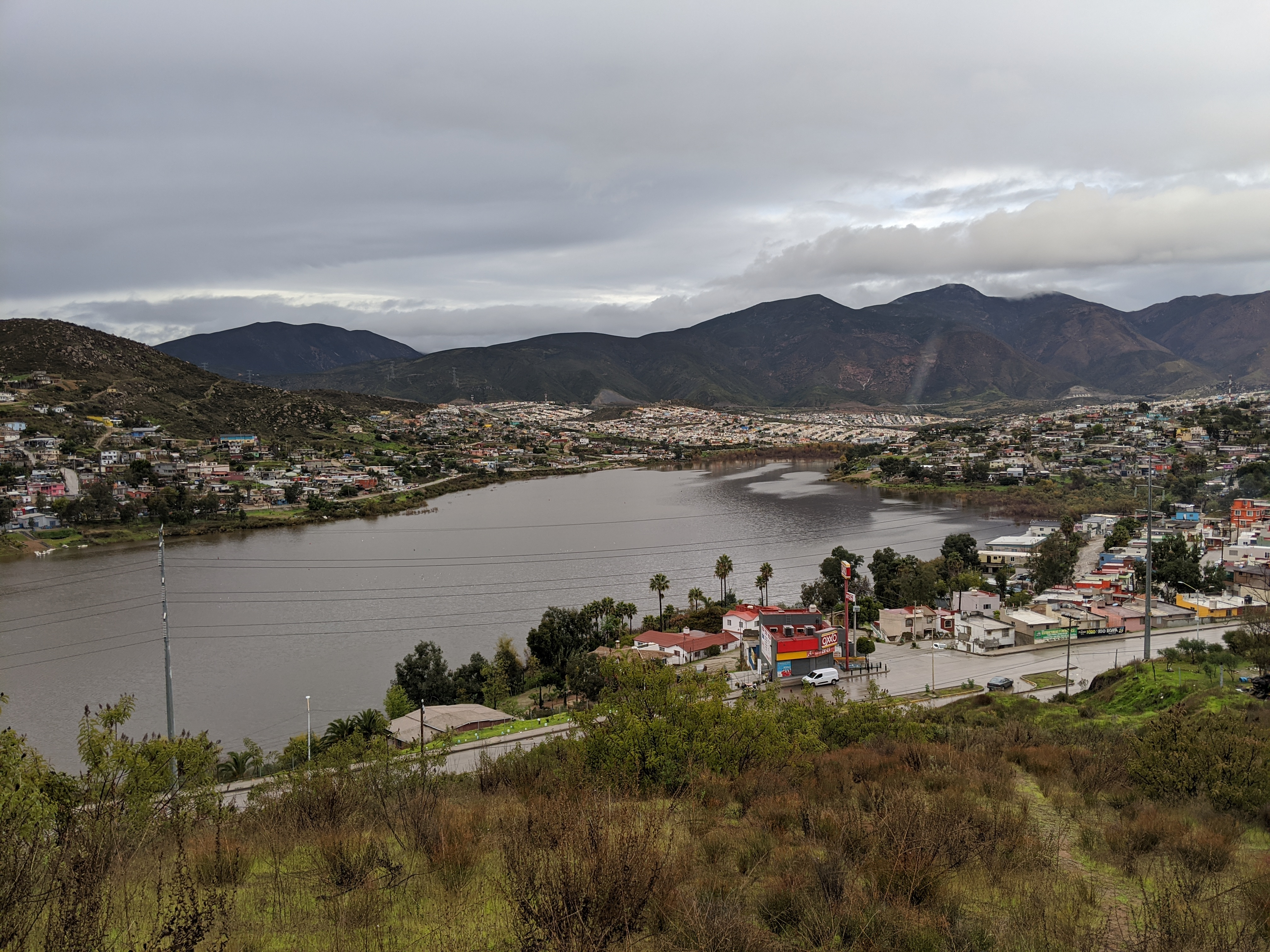
Reservoir (2019)

The dam has a reservoir capacity of about 3.75 million cubic meters. However, the useful capacity is estimated to be about 2.61 million cubic meters, since the bottom has filled with mud and debris. The area of the reservoir is 54 hectares. The dam is a concrete gravity dam with a length of 200 meters and a maximum height of 34 meters. The width of the crest is 8.5 meters. It has a drop spillway with a maximum drain rate of 30 meters cubic per second.

Below the dam, there is a water treatment plant with a capacity of 150 liters per second. It takes water from the reservoir and treats it to drinking level to be sent to the distribution network with a pumping system.

=== Operation ===
The Emilio Lopez Zamora dam is operated by Mexico's National Water Commission. In 2018 preventive maintenance was carried out on the dam with an investment of 2 million pesos.

== History ==
Built in 1976, it was named for hydraulic engineer Emilio Lopez Zamora, who was the Director of Agriculture in Baja California. The purpose of the dam was to contain flash floods from the local streams and surface runoff, and to supply water to the city.

In 1993 an area of 72 hectares was expropriated from the nearby Adolfo Ruiz Cortines community to be part of the reservoir.

== Problems and risks ==
=== Drought ===
The contribution from the dam to the water supply is sporadic, because of the irregularity of the Ensenada stream. The dam has reached very low levels of accumulated water, due to poor rainfall during long drought periods, as occurred in 2014, with the dam becoming almost empty in 2015.

=== Overflow risk ===
The dam has reached its maximum capacity and activated the spillway on several occasions, most recently in 2019. During the intense rainfall of March 4, 1978, (86 millimetres (3.4 in) in 24 hours), there was an overflow scare and sandbags were placed at the top of the crest.

There is uncertainty among the nearby population concerning a potential overflow, with the risks balanced by the fact that the dam did not overflow during the intense rains of 1978, and since then there have not been similar rainfall levels.

The real risk of overflowing is increased when the reservoir partially fills with sand and mud due to the lack of dredging.

=== Garbage and pollution ===
The dam has been illegally used for dumping raw sewage. This situation has worsened due to the population increase in the neighboring communities, including irregular settlements, and with a construction company reported for illegal spilling. On the surface and the edges, garbage and litter, such as plastic bags and bottles, is visible.

=== Suicides ===
In previous years, people have committed suicide by jumping from the dam, until fences were installed to prevent access.

== Other community uses ==
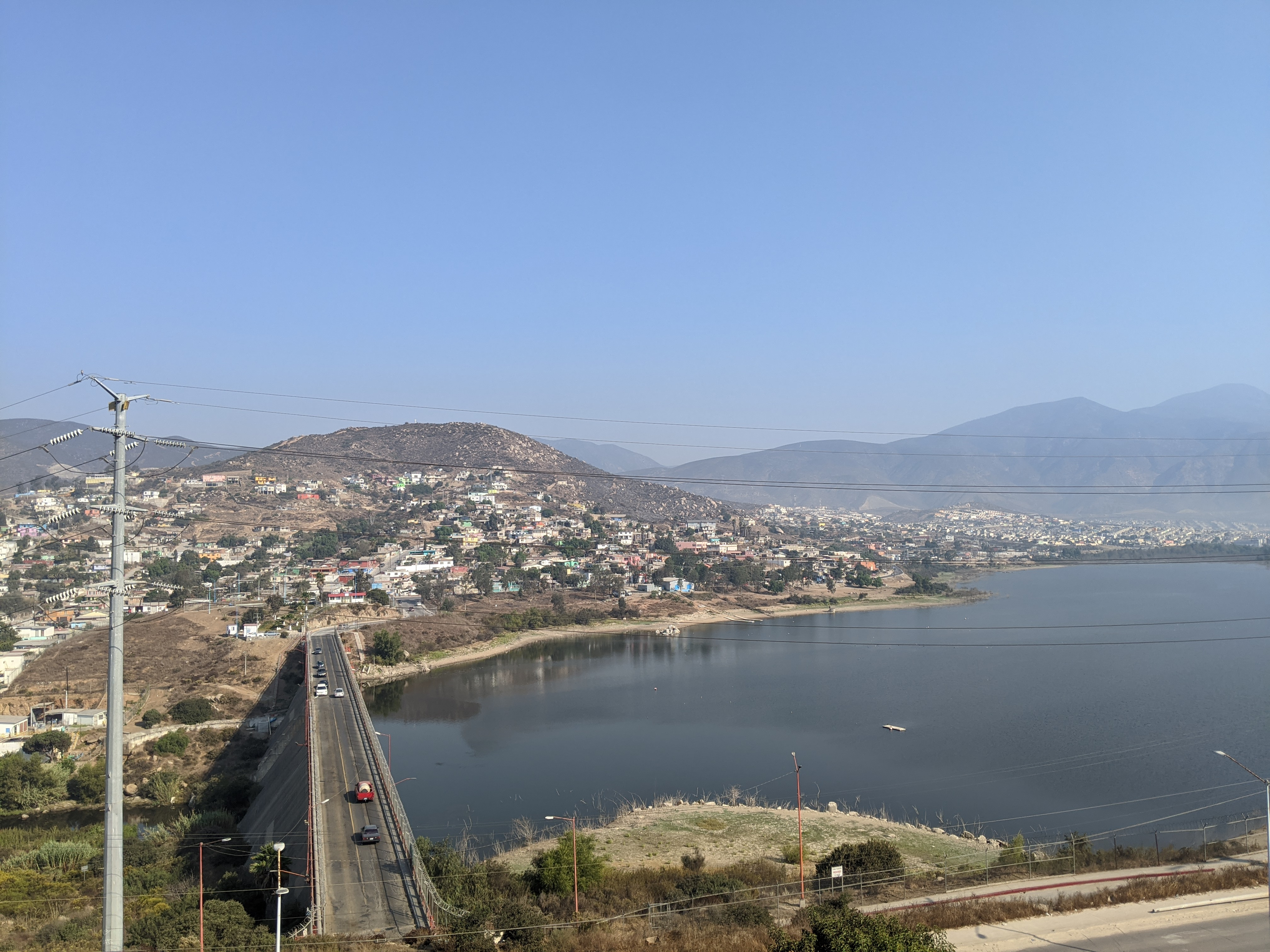
The dam in October 2020

The dam also serves as a vehicular and pedestrian bridge.

In the 2002 the Ensenada city council declared the reservoir and surrounding area as an ecological reserve, and in 2007 it was determined to be a protected zone. Plans have been introduced to create a park around the dam or a series of parks from the dam to the ocean following the stream.

The reservoir has been used as a training site for competitive kayaking and boating.

== Flora and fauna ==
=== Vegetation ===
The vegetation around the dam consists of, in order to distance to the water, marsh (next to the water) with species such as Spartina foliosa and Sarcocornia pacifica; coastal sage scrub, and in the higher areas away from the water coniferous forest type trees such as pines, junipers, and calocedrus.

=== Fish ===
Different fish species have been documented in the reservoir, including exotic species such as threadfin shad (Dorosoma petenense), channel catfish (Ictalurus punctatus), western mosquito fish (Gambusia affinis), bluegill (Lepomis macrochirus), largemouth bass (Micropterus salmoides), and redbelly tilapia (Tilapia zillii).

== See also ==
- List of dams and reservoirs
