= School of Accounting and Administration, UNAM =

Coordinates: 19.32415°N 99.18463°W

School of Accounting and Administration (UNAM)
- Seal of the UNAM's School of Accounting and Administration
- Type: School
- Established: 1930
- President: Victoria Maria Antonieta Martin Granados.
- Students: 16,530
- Undergraduates: 15,173
- Postgraduates: 1,357
- Location: Mexico City, Mexico
- Colors: Blue & Gold

The School of Accounting and Administration of the National Autonomous University of Mexico (UNAM-FCA) is an educational institution in Mexico. Its student enrollment is made up of more than thirteen thousand students, while the school has more than 1,300 lecturers and faculty members. The School currently hosts three majors, Accounting, Administration and Informatics in the UNAM. It has Undergraduate and Graduate programs, being the later some of the most popular in the University, being the only MBA in Ciudad Universitaria.

== History ==
The origins of the School of Accounting date back to the late nineteenth century, with the founding of the National School of Commerce in 1829. The School of Accounting and Administration was created on July 26, 1929, by the promulgation of the Lic. Emilio Portes Gil in the Official Journal of Law of the National Autonomous University of Mexico, in which Chapter II speaks of the establishment of the University and the Faculty of Commerce and Administration.

== Staff and organization ==
The School is run by the Faculty dean, currently B.A. Victoria Maria Antonieta Martin Granados.

== Location ==
The School is located in Ciudad Universitaria in Mexico City, near the School of Engineering and the School of Sciences. It consists in several building blocks, some of them dedicated for classes and other offices. It has one library for Undergraduate Studies.

== Graduate Studies ==
It has the only MBA in Ciudad Universitaria, and some other programs, it has more graduate programs than undergraduate.
