= Faculty of Engineering, UNAM =

Coordinates: 19°19′53″N 99°11′5″W

Faculty of Engineering (UNAM)
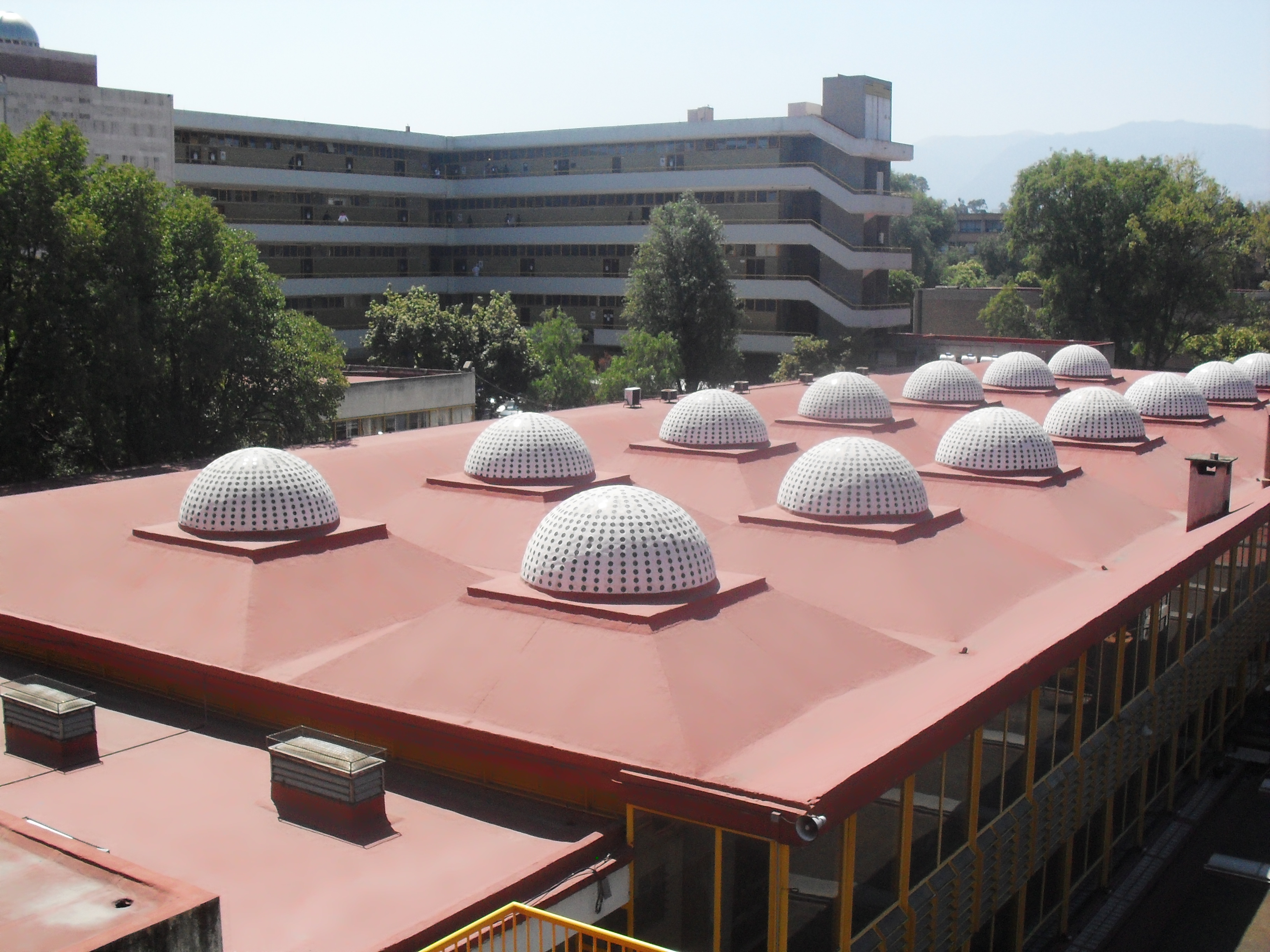
- Type: Faculty
- Established: 1910
- Dean: José Antonio Hernández Espriú
- Students: 12,000
- Undergraduates: 10,900
- Postgraduates: 1,190
- Location: Mexico City, Mexico
- Colors: Blue & Gold (of the University) (of the faculty)
- Website: www.ingenieria.unam.mx

The Faculty of Engineering (Spanish: Facultad de Ingeniería) of the National Autonomous University of Mexico (UNAM) is the division of the aforementioned university in charge of engineering and applied studies in the physical and natural sciences. At the undergraduate level, it offers thirteen majors and some graduate programs. In fall 2008, the school of engineering had over 10,900 undergraduate students and 1,115 graduate students and postdocs. Chemistry and chemical engineering are offered neither by the School of Engineering nor the Faculty of Sciences, but by a separate Faculty of Chemistry.

== History ==
The Faculty of Engineering at the UNAM has its origins as the Real Seminario de Mineria (Royal School of Mining), which building is still standing near the Zocalo in Mexico City. After the university was closed in 1833, several scientific institutes were established in Mexico, all of them related to some branch of engineering. These eventually merged into a single institution which in 1910 was put under the supervision of the newly created UNAM and renamed to Escuela Nacional de Ingeniería (National School of Engineering).

In 1954 the school changes its location to Ciudad Universitaria. In 1959, with the creation of the Engineering Institute and the availability of its first graduate program, the school changes its name to Facultad de Ingeniería (Faculty of Engineering).

== Organization and departments ==
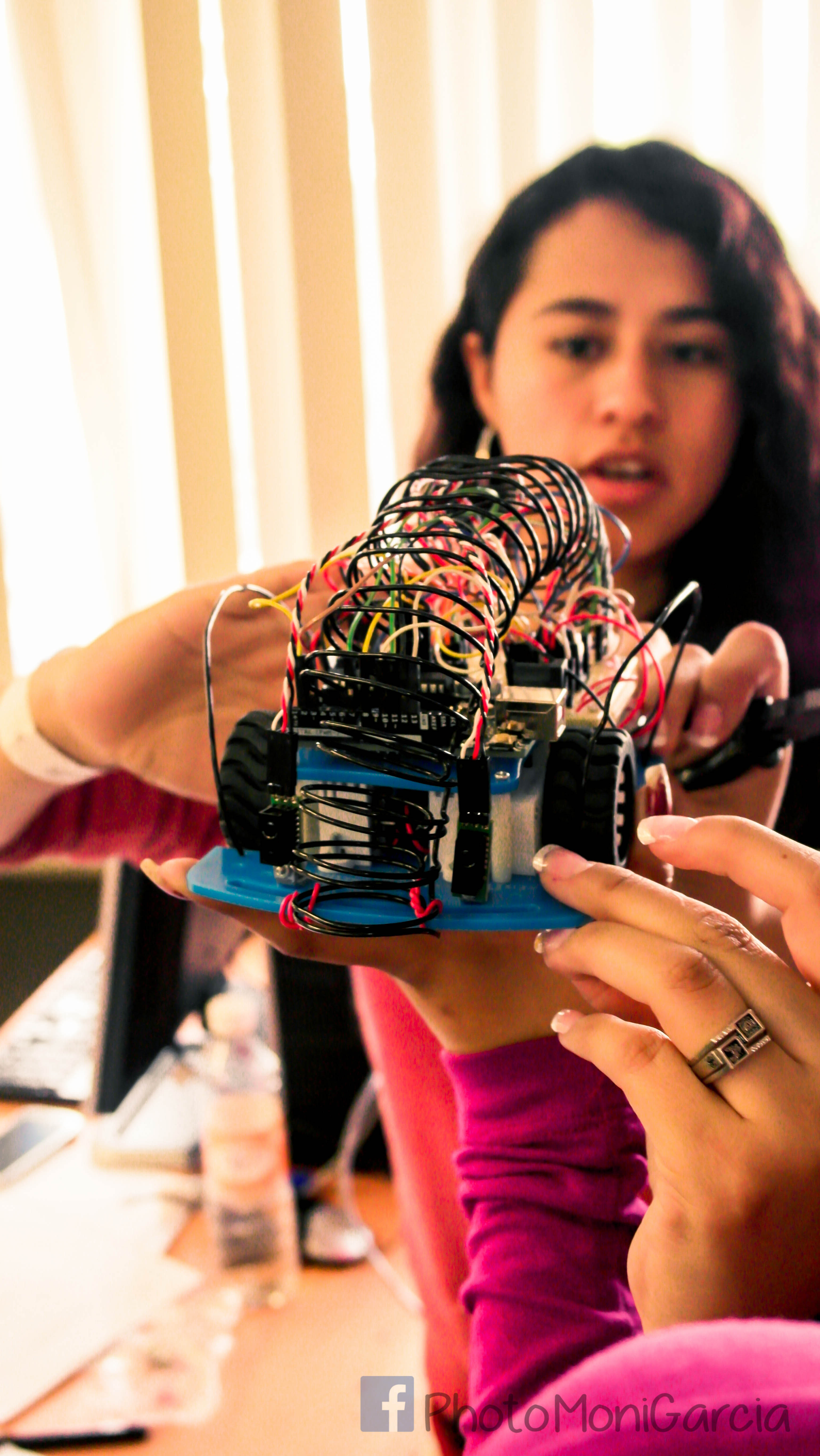
Students designing and build a robot.

The faculty of engineering is organized in divisions (somewhat the equivalent of departments), each under the direct supervision of a Head of division. These are themselves coordinated and supervised by the faculty dean, currently José Antonio Hernández Spriú.

- Fundamental Science Division (DCB):

Is in charge of subjects such as physics and mathematics, every student has to take one or more subjects of this department, specially during the first 4 semesters. These subjects on fundamental science are then common to all students and are often regarded as the most difficult among all.

- Mechanical and Industrial Engineering Division (DIMEI):

In charge of the majors in the name, is the contact between the school and the industry, there are some programs for young entrepreneurial and some courses that may resemble a BA program in US.

- Civil and Geomatic Engineering Division (DICyG)

The civil Engineering division is one of the oldest divisions and has great prestige. Many famous researchers, and business leaders, such as Carlos Slim have studied in this division.

- Electrical Engineering Division (DIE): The Electric Engineering Division is in charge of three different bachelor's degrees: Electric Engineering, Computer Engineering and Telecommunication Engineering. It is the biggest division by number of students, as the degrees it offers have a high employment rate. This division, especially the computer engineering department, has established many on-going collaborations with industry and academia, such as: Google, Intel, IBM, Oracle, Telmex, Microsoft, Carnegie Mellon University, UC Berkeley, Stanford, and Wikimedia Foundation. The DIE has a head chair that coordinates these different departments. The current chair is Alejandro Velázquez Mena. Each department also has its own chair and coordinator. The department with most students, faculty and infrastructure is the Computer Engineering department, whose current coordinator is PhD Rocío Alejandra Aldeco Pérez.
- Earth Sciences Engineering (DICT):

This division is organizes the Mining, Petroleum, Geophysics and Geology Engineering bachelor Programs. Is one of the oldest divisions in the school and currently has some joint programs with PEMEX among other petroleum companies.

- Distance and Continuing Education Division:

As the name implies, this division is in charge of courses and diplomas for active professionals who wish to stay up to date with current technological trends or wish to stay in contact with the academic community in some way other than the conventional graduate programs.

- Social Sciences and Humanities Division (DCSyH):

In charge of cultural activities and some subjects, such as literature, ethics and history.

== Graduate programs ==
Each division within the Faculty of Engineering organizes graduate programs. There are also graduate programs in cooperation with other graduate programs and other higher education institutions in Mexico.

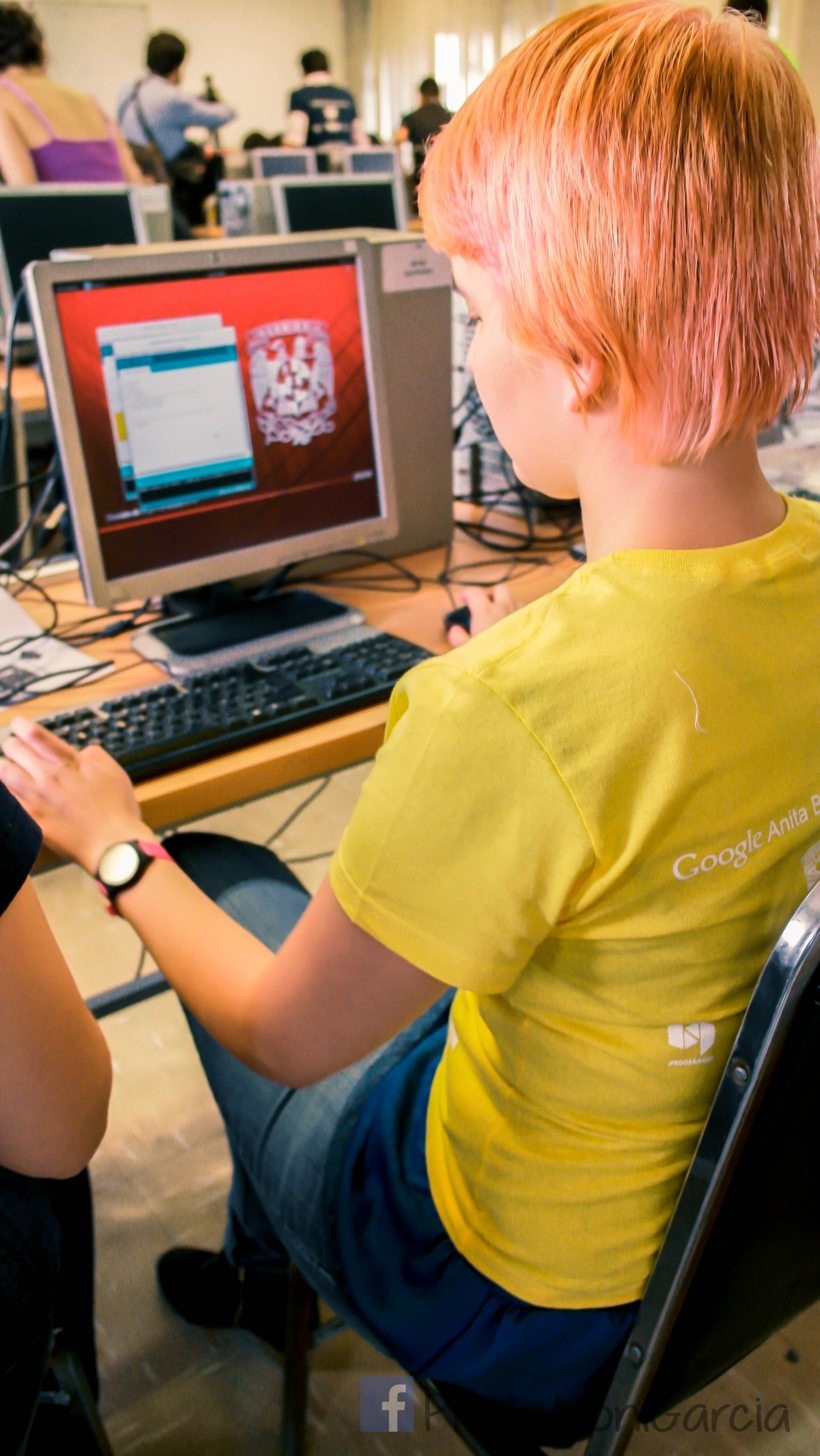
Girl programming a microcontroller at UNAM's School of Engineering.

== Location and facilities ==
The Faculty of Engineering has numerous facilities, most of which are located in Ciudad Universitaria in Mexico City, between Faculty of Science and the Faculty of Administration.

It has two libraries for undergraduate students and one for graduate ones. It also has some of Mexico's finest laboratories for civil and mechanical engineering, and various laboratories of electronic engineering.

== Noted alumni and faculty ==
- Ángela Alessio Robles, Mexican civil engineer and town planner in Mexico City, later oversaw the development of the Macroplaza in Monterrey.
- Carlos Slim, (Civil Engineer, Business man, and former world's wealthiest person).
- Jesus Savage, (Professor in Computer Engineering, researcher, and founder of the Mexican Institute of Robotics).
- Nabor Carrillo Flores (a soil mechanics expert, a nuclear energy advisor and former president of UNAM).
- Rodolfo Neri Vela, (Professor in Telecommunications Engineering and the first Mexican in space).
- Daniel Vargas, (Electrical Engineer and Volleyball Olympian).
- Jordi Messeguer Gally, (Industrial Engineer and PRD congressman).
- Leda Speciale, (first Mexican woman to be a civil engineer, and currently an honorary professor in the school of engineering).
- Enrique Martínez Romero, (Civil Engineer of the Torre Mayor, and Mexico City's international airport).
- Leonardo Zeevaert, (Civil Engineer of the Torre Latinoamericana).
- Mariana Gonzalez, (Electrical Engineer, Entrepreneur, and co-founder of iluMexico, a Mexican social enterprise, that bring solar electricity to all Mexican homes).
- Julián Adem (Professor, researcher and civil engineer who developed important models to predict climate conditions).
- Miguel Pedro Romo Organista (Civil Engineer, professor and researcher who innovated in building structures and materials to overcome earthquakes).
- Juan Jacobo Shmittern (Doctorate in Civil Engineering).
- California Odha Zertuche Díaz, primary developer of the drinking water and sewerage system in Ensenada, Mexico.

== Rankings ==
According to the QS Universities Rankings (2024) the Faculty of Engineering is positioned in the following rankings:

Engineering Petroleum 28

Engineering and Technology: 66

Previous rankings (2022):

Civil Engineering:51-100

Mechanical Engineering:151-200

== Student organizations ==
The school of engineering has several student organizations, among them a Tuna, a chorus and a photo club.

Each major has its own student organization, which is in charge of promoting activities related to each specialization, such as extracurricular courses, workshops or congresses.

- SAFIR Sociedad Astronómica de la Facultad de Ingeniería (Astronomical Society of the Faculty of Engineering)

=== Presidents of SAFIR ===
| Period | President | Career coursing |
|---|---|---|
| 1997-1999 | Alejandro Farah Simón (Founder) | Mechanical Engineering |
| 1999-2000 | Penélope López | Mechanical Engineering |
| 2000-2002 | Francisco Tovar | Mechanical Engineering |
| 2002-2003 | Samanta Sabodka | Geophysical Engineering |
| 2003-2004 | Marisol Hernández Cuellar | Computer Engineering |
| 2004-2006 | Luis Efrén Flores | Electronical Engineering |
| 2006-2007 | Luis Vidal | Mechanical Engineering |
| 2007-2008 | Víctor Becerra Herrera | Civil Engineering |
| 2008-2009 | David Luna Martínez | Mechanical Engineering |
| 2009-2010 | Douglas Alberto Gómez Reyes | Geophysical Engineering |
| 2010-2011 | Mario Arturo Nieto Butrón | Computer Engineering |
| 2011-2012 | Agustín Romero | Mechanical Engineering |
| 2012-2013 | Diego Ulises Mendoza Arroyo | Telecommunications Engineering |
| 2013-2014 | Aldo Daniel Acosta Duran | Computer Engineering |
| 2014-2015 | Antonio Lledías | Mechanical Engineering |
| 2015–Present | Oscar Iván Calderón Hernández | Geophysical Engineering |
