= List of universities in Mexico =

This is a list of universities in Mexico.

== Federal Universities ==
- General Coordination of Technological and Polytechnic Universities (CGUT)
- National Pedagogic University
- National Polytechnic Institute
- National Technological Institute of Mexico
- Antonio Narro Agrarian Autonomous University
- Chapingo Autonomous University
- Metropolitan Autonomous University
- Open and Distance University of Mexico
- National Autonomous University of Mexico

== Institutes of Technology (Branches of Tecnologico Nacional de México) ==
- Instituto Tecnológico de Acapulco
- Instituto Tecnológico de Aguascalientes
- Instituto Tecnológico de Celaya (es:Instituto Tecnologico de Celaya)
- Instituto Tecnológico de Chetumal (ITCH), Chetumal, Quintana Roo
- Instituto Tecnológico de Chihuahua
- Instituto Tecnológico de Chihuahua II
- Instituto Tecnológico de Ciudad Juárez, Ciudad Juárez, Chihuahua
- Instituto Tecnológico de Ciudad Madero (ITCM), Ciudad Madero, Tamaulipas
- Instituto Tecnológico de Culiacán, Culiacán, Sinaloa
- Instituto Tecnológico de Durango (ITD), Durango, Durango
- Instituto Tecnológico de Ensenada (ITE), Ensenada, Baja California
- Instituto Tecnológico de Hermosillo (ITH), Hermosillo, Sonora, Torreón, Coahuila
- Instituto Tecnológico de La Paz (ITLP), La Paz, Baja California Sur
- Instituto Tecnológico de Mexicali (ITM), Mexicali, Baja California
- Instituto Tecnológico de Morelia (ITM), Morelia, Michoacán
- Instituto Tecnológico de Oaxaca (ITO), Oaxaca, Oaxaca
- Instituto Tecnológico de Pabellón de Arteaga
- Instituto Tecnológico de Puebla (ITO), Puebla, Puebla
- Instituto Tecnológico de Querétaro (ITQ), Santiago de Querétaro, Querétaro
- Instituto Tecnológico de Saltillo, Saltillo, Coahuila
- Instituto Tecnológico de Sonora
- Instituto Tecnológico de Tepic (ITT), Tepic, Nayarit
- Instituto Tecnológico de Tijuana (ITT), Tijuana, Baja California
- Instituto Tecnológico de Toluca, Toluca
- Instituto Tecnológico de Tuxtepec
- Instituto Tecnológico de Tuxtla Gutiérrez, Tuxtla Gutiérrez, Chiapas
- Instituto Tecnológico del Valle de Oaxaca (ITVO)
- Instituto Tecnológico de Veracruz
- Instituto Tecnológico de Villahermosa, Villahermosa, Tabasco
- Instituto Tecnológico de Zacatepec
- Instituto Tecnológico El Llano (ITLLANO)
- Instituto Tecnologico Superior de Acayucan
- Instituto Tecnológico Superior de Cajeme
- Instituto Tecnológico Superior de Ciudad Constitución (ITSCC), Ciudad Constitución, B. C. S.
- Instituto Tecnológico de Minatitlán (ITM) Minatitlán, Veracruz
- Instituto Tecnológico Superior de Coatzacoalcos (ITESCO), Coatzacoalcos, Veracruz
- Instituto Tecnologico Superior de Poza Rica (ITSPR), Poza Rica, Veracruz
- Instituto Tecnológico Superior de Puerto Penasco (ITSPP)
- Instituto Tecnológico Superior de Zacapoaxtla (ITSZ), Zacapoaxtla, Puebla
- Instituto Tecnológico Superior del Sur de Guanajuato
- Instituto Tecnológico Superior Zacatecas Occidente
- Instituto Tecnológico Superior Zapopan

== State Universities ==
- Autonomous University of Aguascalientes
- Autonomous University of Baja California
- Autonomous University of Baja California Sur
- Autonomous University of Campeche
- Autonomous University of Chiapas
- Autonomous University of Chihuahua
- Autonomous University of Ciudad Juárez
- Autonomous University of Coahuila
- Autonomous University of the City of Mexico
- Autonomous University of Durango
- Autonomous University of Guerrero
- Autonomous University of Nayarit
- Autonomous University of Nuevo León
- Autonomous University of the State of Hidalgo
- Autonomous University of the State of Mexico
- Autonomous University of the State of Morelos
- Autonomous University of Querétaro
- Autonomous University of San Luis Potosí
- Autonomous University of Sinaloa
- Autonomous University of Tamaulipas
- Autonomous University of Tlaxcala
- Autonomous University of Yucatán
- Autonomous University of Zacatecas
- Autonomous University of Carmen
- Benito Juárez Autonomous University of Oaxaca
- Juárez Autonomous University of Tabasco
- Juárez University of the State of Durango
- Michoacan University of San Nicolás de Hidalgo
- Meritorious Autonomous University of Puebla
- Metropolitan Autonomous University
- People's Autonomous University of Veracruz
- University of Colima
- University of Guadalajara
- University of Guanajuato
- University of Quintana Roo
- University of Sciences and Arts of Chiapas
- University of Sonora
- Veracruzana University

== Research centers ==
Most of these are related to CONACYT.

- Center for Research and Advanced Studies of the National Polytechnic Institute (CINVESTAV)
- Centro de Investigacion Cientifica y de Educacion Superior de Ensenada, CICESE
- Centro de Investigación en Ciencia Aplicada y Tecnología Avanzada, CICATA
- Center for Economic Research and Teaching (CIDE)
- El Colegio de la Frontera Norte (COLEF)
- El Colegio de México (Colmex)
- El Colegio de la Frontera Sur (EcoSur)
- El Colegio de San Luis Potosí (ColSan)
- El Colegio de Michoacán (ColMich)
- El Colegio de Postgraduados (ColPos)
- Escuela Nacional de Antropología e Historia (ENAH)
- Centro de Investigación y Estudios Superiores en Antropología Social (CIESAS)
- Centro de Investigación en Ciencias de Información Geoespacial (CentroGeo)
- Centro Nacional de las Artes (CENART)
- Instituto Potosino de Investigación Científica y Tecnológica (IPICYT)
- Instituto Nacional de Astrofísica, Óptica y Electrónica (INAOE)
- Instituto de Investigaciones Dr. José María Luis Mora (Instituto Mora)
- Facultad Latinoamericana de Ciencias Sociales (FLACSO Mexico)

== Regional Universities ==
- University of Sciences and Arts of Chiapas
- University of la Mar
- Universidad del Istmo
- University of la Cañada
- University of the Sierra
- Universidad de la Sierra Juárez
- Universidad de la Sierra Sur, Oaxaca
- Universidad Politécnica de Pachuca

== Polytechnic Universities ==
- Polytechnic University of Aguascalientes
- Polytechnic University of Baja California
- Polytechnic University of Chiapas
- Polytechnic University of Tapachula
- Polytechnic University of Chihuahua
- Polytechnic University of Piedras Negras
- Polytechnic University of Ramos Arizpe
- Polytechnic University of Cuencame
- Polytechnic University of Durango
- Polytechnic University of Gomez Palacio
- Polytechnic University of Tecamac
- Polytechnic University of Texcoco
- Polytechnic University of the Valley of Mexico
- Polytechnic University of the Valley of Toluca
- Polytechnic University of Guanajuato
- Polytechnic University of Juventino Rosas
- Polytechnic University of Penjamo
- Polytechnic University of the Bicentennial
- Polytechnic University of the State of Guerrero
- Polytechnic University of Francisco I. Madero
- Polytechnic University of Huejutla
- Metropolitan Polytechnic University of Hidalgo
- Polytechnic University of Pachuca
- Polytechnic University of Tulancingo
- Polytechnic University of the Metropolitan Area of Guadalajara
- Polytechnic University of Lazaro Cardenas
- Polytechnic University of Uruapan
- Polytechnic University of the State of Morelos
- Polytechnic University of Apodaca
- Polytechnic University of Amozoc
- Metropolitan Polytechnic University of Puebla
- Polytechnic University of Puebla
- Polytechnic University of Queretaro
- Polytechnic University of Santa Rosa Jauregui
- Polytechnic University of Bacalar
- Polytechnic University of Quintana Roo
- Polytechnic University of San Luis Potosi
- Polytechnic University of the Sea and the Sierra
- Polytechnic University of Sinaloa
- Polytechnic University of the Valley of Evora
- Polytechnic University of the Center
- Polytechnic University of the Gulf of Mexico
- Mesoamerican Polytechnic University
- Polytechnic University of Altamira
- Polytechnic University of the Riberenia Region
- Polytechnic University of Victoria
- Polytechnic University of Tlaxcala Western Region
- Polytechnic University of Tlaxcala
- Polytechnic University of Huatusco
- Polytechnic University of the South of Zacatecas
- Polytechnic University of Zacatecas

== Technological Universities ==
- Universidad Tecnológica de Aguascalientes
- Universidad Tecnológica de Netzahualcoyotl
- Universidad Tecnológica de Tula Tepeji
- Universidad Tecnológica de Querétaro
- Universidad Tecnológica de Coahuila
- Universidad Tecnológica de la Costa Grande
- Universidad Tecnológica "Emiliano Zapata" del Estado de Morelos
- Universidad Tecnológica de los Valles Centrales de Oaxaca
- Universidad Tecnológica del Estado de Zacatecas
- Universidad Tecnológica Fidel Velázquez
- Universidad Tecnológica General Mariano Escobedo
- Universidad Tecnológica de Hermosillo
- Universidad Tecnológica de la Huasteca Hidalguense
- Universidad Tecnológica de Huejotzingo
- Universidad Tecnológica de Izúcar de Matamoros
- Universidad Tecnológica de Jalisco
- Universidad Tecnológica de Morelia
- Universidad Tecnológica del Sur de Sonora
- Universidad Tecnológica de Nogales
- Universidad Tecnológica del Norte de Aguascalientes
- Universidad Tecnológica del Norte de Coahuila
- Universidad Tecnológica del Norte de Guanajuato
- Universidad Tecnológica Regional del Sur
- Universidad Tecnológica de San Juan del Río
- Universidad Tecnológica de San Luis Potosí
- Universidad Tecnológica de Santa Catarina
- Universidad Tecnológica de la Selva
- Universidad Tecnológica del Sur del Estado de México
- Universidad Tecnológica del Suroeste de Guanajuato
- Universidad Tecnológica de Tabasco
- Universidad Tecnológica de Tamaulipas Norte
- Universidad Tecnológica de Tecamac
- Universidad Tecnológica de Tecamachalco
- Universidad Tecnológica de Tijuana
- Universidad Tecnológica de Tlaxcala
- Universidad Tecnológica de Torreon
- Universidad Tecnológica de la Zona Metropolitana de Guadalajara
- Universidad Tecnológica de Tulancingo
- Universidad Tecnológica del Valle del Mezquital
- Universidad Tecnológica de Campeche
- Universidad Tecnológica de Cancun
- Universidad Tecnológica de Chihuahua
- Universidad Tecnológica de Leon
- Universidad Tecnológica de Ciudad Juarez
- Universidad Tecnológica Metropolitana
- Universidad Tecnológica de Matamoros
- Universidad Tecnológica de la Región Centro de Coahuila
- Universidad Tecnológica de Nayarit
- Universidad Tecnológica de Puebla
- Universidad Tecnológica de la Sierra Hidalguense
- Universidad Tecnológica del Valle de Toluca
- Universidad Tecnológica de Xicotepec de Juarez
- Universidad Tecnológica de la Zona Metropolitana del Valle de México
- Universidad Tecnológica de la Costa
- Universidad Tecnológica de Altamira
- Universidad Tecnológica de Nuevo Laredo
- Universidad Tecnológica del Sureste de Veracruz
- Universidad Tecnológica del Usumacinta
- Universidad Tecnológica de la Región Norte de Guerrero
- Universidad Tecnológica de Bahia de Banderas
- Universidad Tecnológica de la Riviera Maya
- Universidad Tecnológica del Centro de Veracruz

== Private institutions ==
=== Universities ===
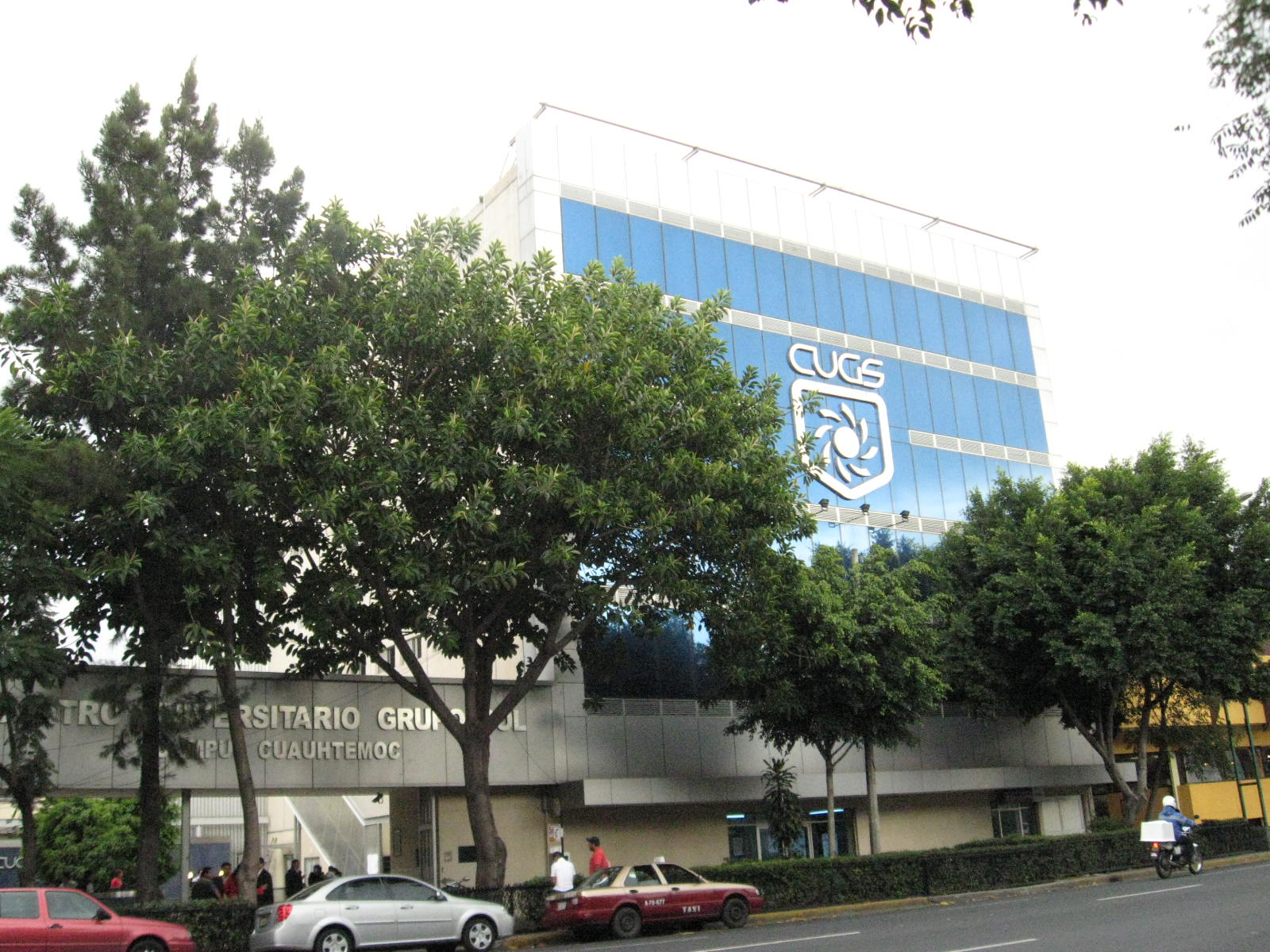
Centro Universitario Grupo Sol Campus Cuauhtemoc, located on Avenida Cuauhtemoc Col Doctores in Mexico City

- Centre for University Studies Rudolph Diesel
- Centro de Enseñanza Técnica y Superior (CETYS)
- Centro de Estudios Universitarios Xochicalco, CEUX
- Centro Universitario Grupo Sol
- Centro Universitario México, División de Estudios Superiores (now Universidad Marista)
- Escuela Libre de Derecho
- Instituto de Estudios Avanzados en Odontologia
- Pontifical University of Mexico, Mexico City
- Seminario Teológico Juan Calvino, Mexico City
- TECH Technological University
- Universidad Anáhuac
- Universidad Anáhuac del Sur
- Universidad Anáhuac del Norte
- Universidad Anáhuac Oaxaca
- Universidad Autónoma de Guadalajara (UAG), Guadalajara, Jalisco
- Universidad Azteca
- Universidad Casa Blanca
- Universidad Cristóbal Colón
- Universidad Cuauhtémoc Plantel Aguascalientes
- Universidad De La Salle Bajio, Leon, Guanajuato
- Universidad de Celaya,Celaya, Guanajuato
- Universidad de las Americas, A.C., Mexico City
- Universidad de las Américas Puebla (UDLAP), Puebla, Puebla
- Universidad Modelo, Mérida, Yucatán
- Universidad de Montemorelos, Montemorelos, Nuevo León
- Universidad de Monterrey (UDEM)
- Universidad de Navojoa, Navojoa, Sinaloa
- Universidad de la Veracruz (UNIVER)
- Universidad del Claustro de Sor Juana
- Universidad del Golfo de México (UGM)
- Universidad del Mar, Huatulco, Oaxaca
- Universidad del Noreste
- Universidad del Nuevo Mundo
- Universidad del Valle de México
- Universidad España (UNES)
- Universidad Humanitas
- Universidad Iberoamericana Ciudad de México
- Universidad Iberoamericana León
- Universidad Iberoamericana Puebla
- Universidad Iberoamericana Torreon
- Universidad Iberoamericana Tijuana
- Universidad Intercontinental
- Universidad Interglobal
- Universidad La Salle (ULSA)
- Universidad La Salle Pachuca (ULSA Pachuca)
- Universidad La Salle Cancun
- Universidad Latina de América
- Universidad Latina de Mexico
- Universidad Latinoamericana
- Universidad Linda Vista, Pueblo Nuevo Solistahuacán, Chiapas
- Universidad Loyola del Pacífico
- Universidad Mexico Internacional
- Universidad Marista de Guadalajara
- Universidad Marista Ciudad de Mexico
- Universidad Marista de Merida
- Universidad Marista de Queretaro
- Universidad México-Americana del Norte
- Universidad Motolinía
- Universidad Nacional de Ciencias Penales, Administrativas y de La Seguridad
- Universidad Panamericana Sede Guadalajara
- Universidad Panamericana Sede México
- Universidad Popular Autónoma del Estado de Puebla (UPAEP)
- Universidad Regiomontana
- Universidad TecMilenio (UTM)
- Universidad Americana de Europa (UNADE)
- Universidad Tecnológica de México (UNITEC)
- Universidad Uk
- ESCENA Escuela de Animación y Arte Digital (ESCENA)

=== Technological institutes ===
- Instituto Tecnológico Autónomo de México (ITAM), Mexico City
- Monterrey Institute of Technology (ITESM)
- Instituto Tecnológico y de Estudios Superiores de Occidente (ITESO), Guadalajara, Jalisco
- Instituto de Estudios Superiores de Tamaulipas (IEST), Tampico, Tamaulipas
- Instituto Tecnológico Superior de Sinaloa (ITESUS)

=== Others ===
- Alliant International University (AIU), Mexico City
- Kirjner Business School A.C. (Kirjner Institute), Mexico City
- Universidad Autónoma Indígena de México, Mochicahui, Sinaloa
- Instituto Superior Intercultural Ayuuk, Jaltepec de Candayoc, Oaxaca
- Instituto Superior de Intérpretes y Traductores, Mexico City
- Centro Universitario Incarnate Word (Incarnate Word University, Mexico City Campus), Mexico City
- Universidad Incarnate Word (Incarnate Word University, Irapuato Campus), Irapuato, Guanajuato, Mexico

=== Universidad online ===
- Centro de Estudios Avanzados de Las Américas CEAAM, Mexico City
