= Asociación de Básquetbol Estudiantil =

Mexican college football league

Student Basketball Association
- Current season, competition or edition: 2026–2027 ABE season
- Sport: Basketball
- Founded: 2013
- First season: 2013
- Country: Mexico
- Continent: North America
- Website: abemexico.org

Student Basketball Association (Spanish: Asociación de Básquetbol Estudiantil or ABE), known as the Liga ABE México, is the major college basketball league in Mexico. It was founded in 2013 in order to unify the universities into one national league for both women's and men's basketball.

The league started with 40 teams in Division I and 70 teams in Division II, with many more public and private universities having joined.

== Teams ==
=== Women's 2025–2026 ===
Division I
Team	Universidad	Campus
Águilas UPAEP	Universidad Popular Autónoma del Estado de Puebla	Puebla
Aztecas UDLAP	Universidad de las Américas Puebla	San Andrés Cholula
Borregas Tec Aguascalientes	Instituto Tecnológico y de Estudios Superiores de Monterrey	Aguascalientes
Borregas Tec CEM	Instituto Tecnológico y de Estudios Superiores de Monterrey	Estado de México
Borregas Tec Guadalajara	Instituto Tecnológico y de Estudios Superiores de Monterrey	Guadalajara
Borregas Tec Hidalgo	Instituto Tecnológico y de Estudios Superiores de Monterrey	Hidalgo
Borregas Tec Monterrey	Instituto Tecnológico y de Estudios Superiores de Monterrey	Monterrey
Borregas Tec Querétaro	Instituto Tecnológico y de Estudios Superiores de Monterrey	Querétaro
Borregas Tec Toluca	Instituto Tecnológico y de Estudios Superiores de Monterrey	Toluca
Gallas CEU	Centro de Estudios Universitarios	Monterrey
Halconas Inter	Universidad Interamericana	Puebla
Halconas UVAQ	Universidad Vasco de Quiroga	Morelia
Leonas Anáhuac México Norte	Universidad Anáhuac México	Mexico City
Tigrillas UANL	Universidad Autónoma de Nuevo León	Monterrey
Zorras CETYS	CETYS Universidad	Tijuana
Division II
Conferencia Bajío-Occidente
Team	Universidad	Campus
Abejas UG	Universidad de Guanajuato	Guanajuato
Águilas TECNM Celaya	Tecnológico Nacional de México	Celaya
Águilas UASLP	Universidad Autónoma de San Luis Potosí	San Luis Potosí
Águilas UCA	Universidad Cuauhtémoc	Aguascalientes
Bulldogs UdeC	Universidad de Celaya	Celaya
Felinas La Salle Bajío	Universidad De La Salle Bajío	León
Gatas Salvajes UAQ	Universidad Autónoma de Querétaro	Querétaro
Leonas Anáhuac Querétaro	Universidad Anáhuac	Querétaro
Linces UVM Querétaro	Universidad del Valle de México	Querétaro
Panteras Montrer	Universidad Montrer	Morelia
Panteras UP Guadalajara	Universidad Panamericana	Guadalajara
Tlacuaches ITESO	Instituto Tecnológico y de Estudios Superiores de Occidente	Guadalajara
Conferencia Centro-Oriente
Team	Universidad	Campus
Águilas La Salle	Universidad La Salle	Mexico City
Coyotas La Salle Neza	Universidad La Salle	Ciudad Nezahualcóyotl
Gamos UMA	Universidad Marista	Mexico City
Halcones UV	Universidad Veracruzana	Xalapa
Jaguares UAMP	Universidad Americana de Puebla	San Andrés Cholula
Leonas Anáhuac México Sur	Universidad Anáhuac	Mexico City
Leonas Anáhuac Puebla	Universidad Anáhuac	San Andrés Cholula
Leonas Anáhuac Xalapa	Universidad Anáhuac	Xalapa
Linces UVM Centro	Universidad del Valle de México	Mexico City
Linces UVM Lomas Verdes	Universidad del Valle de México	Lomas Verdes
Lobas BUAP	Benemérita Universidad Autónoma de Puebla	Puebla
Lobas IBERO CDMX	Universidad Iberoamericana	Mexico City
Potras UAEM	Universidad Autónoma del Estado de México	Toluca
Pumas UNAM	Universidad Nacional Autónoma de México	Ciudad Universitaria
Tigresas Blancas UMAD	Universidad Madero	San Andrés Cholula
Conferencia Norte
Team	Universidad	Campus
Águilas TECNM Fresnillo	Tecnológico Nacional de México	Fresnillo
Águilas UACH	Universidad Autónoma de Chihuahua	Chihuahua
Borregas Tec Chihuahua	Instituto Tecnológico y de Estudios Superiores de Monterrey	Chihuahua
Borregas Tec Laguna	Instituto Tecnológico y de Estudios Superiores de Monterrey	Torreón
Indias UACJ	Universidad Autónoma de Ciudad Juárez	Ciudad Juárez
Lobas IBERO Torreón	Universidad Iberoamericana Torreón	Torreón
Lobas UAdeC	Universidad Autónoma de Coahuila	Saltillo
Troyanas UDEM	Universidad de Monterrey	San Pedro Garza García
Tuzas UAZ	Universidad Autónoma de Zacatecas	Zacatecas

=== Men's 2025–2026 ===
Division I
Team	Universidad	Campus
Águilas UACH	Universidad Autónoma de Chihuahua	Chihuahua
Águilas UPAEP	Universidad Popular Autónoma del Estado de Puebla	Puebla
Aztecas UDLAP	Universidad de las Américas Puebla	Puebla
Borregos Tec Guadalajara	Instituto Tecnológico y de Estudios Superiores de Monterrey	Guadalajara
Borregos Tec Hidalgo	Instituto Tecnológico y de Estudios Superiores de Monterrey	Hidalgo
Borregos Tec Monterrey	Instituto Tecnológico y de Estudios Superiores de Monterrey	Monterrey
Borregos Tec Puebla	Instituto Tecnológico y de Estudios Superiores de Monterrey	Puebla
Borregos Tec Santa Fe	Instituto Tecnológico y de Estudios Superiores de Monterrey	Santa Fe
Borregos Tec Toluca	Instituto Tecnológico y de Estudios Superiores de Monterrey	Toluca
Gallos CEU	Centro de Estudios Universitarios	Monterrey
Halcones Inter	Universidad Interamericana	Puebla
Leones Anáhuac Querétaro	Universidad Anáhuac	Querétaro
Leones Anáhuac Xalapa	Universidad Anáhuac	Xalapa
Panteras Montrer	Universidad Montrer	Morelia
Panteras UP México	Universidad Panamericana	Mexico City
Tigres UANL	Universidad Autónoma de Nuevo León	Monterrey
Tigres Blancos UMAD	Universidad Madero	Puebla
Zorros CETYS	CETYS Universidad	Mexicali
Division II
Conferencia Bajío Occidente
Team	Universidad	Campus
Abejas UG	Universidad de Guanajuato	Guanajuato
Águilas TECNM Aguascalientes	Tecnológico Nacional de México	Aguascalientes
Águilas TECNM Celaya	Tecnológico Nacional de México	Celaya
Águilas TECNM Jiquilpan	Tecnológico Nacional de México	Jiquilpan
Águilas UASLP	Universidad Autónoma de San Luis Potosí	San Luis Potosí
Águilas UCA	Universidad Cuauhtémoc	Aguascalientes
Águilas UCG	Universidad Cuauhtémoc	Guadalajara
Borregos Tec León	Instituto Tecnológico y de Estudios Superiores de Monterrey	León
Borregos Tec Querétaro	Instituto Tecnológico y de Estudios Superiores de Monterrey	Querétaro
Bulldogs UdeC	Universidad de Celaya	Celaya
Felinos La Salle Bajío	Universidad De La Salle Bajío	León
Gallos UAA	Universidad Autónoma de Aguascalientes	Aguascalientes
Gatos Salvajes UAQ	Universidad Autónoma de Querétaro	Querétaro
Halcones UVAQ	Universidad Vasco de Quiroga	Morelia
Linces UVM Querétaro	Universidad del Valle de México	Querétaro
Linces UVM Zapopan	Universidad del Valle de México	Zapopan
Panteras UP Aguascalientes	Universidad Panamericana	Aguascalientes
Panteras UP Guadalajara	Universidad Panamericana	Guadalajara
Potros UNLA	Universidad Latina de América	Morelia
Tlacuaches ITESO	Instituto Tecnológico y de Estudios Superiores de Occidente	Guadalajara
Conferencia Centro-Oriente
Team	Universidad	Campus
Águilas La Salle	Universidad La Salle	Mexico City
Cacomixtles UPAV Teziutlán	Universidad Popular Autónoma de Veracruz	Teziutlán
Coyotes La Salle Neza	Universidad La Salle	Ciudad Nezahualcóyotl
Gamos UMA	Universidad Marista	Mexico City
Guerreros UC Puebla	Universidad Cuauhtémoc	Puebla
Jaguares UAMP	Universidad Americana de Puebla	San Andrés Cholula
Halcones UV	Universidad Veracruzana	Xalapa
Leones Anáhuac Córdoba-Orizaba	Universidad Anáhuac	Córdoba
Leones Anáhuac México Sur	Universidad Anáhuac	Mexico City
Leones Anáhuac Puebla	Universidad Anáhuac	San Andrés Cholula
Linces UVM Centro	Universidad del Valle de México	Mexico City
Linces UVM Lomas Verdes	Universidad del Valle de México	Lomas Verdes
Lobos BUAP	Benemérita Universidad Autónoma de Puebla	Puebla
Potros UAEM	Universidad Autónoma del Estado de México	Toluca
Potros Salvajes IES	Instituto de Estudios Superiores de la Sierra	Teziutlán
Pumas UNAM	Universidad Nacional Autónoma de México	Ciudad Universitaria
Conferencia Norte
Team	Universidad	Campus
Águilas TECNM Fresnillo	Tecnológico Nacional de México	Fresnillo
Borregos Tec Laguna	Instituto Tecnológico y de Estudios Superiores de Monterrey	Torreón
Halcones UAL	Universidad Autónoma de La Laguna	Torreón
Indios UACJ	Universidad Autónoma de Ciudad Juárez	Ciudad Juárez
Lobos IBERO Torreón	Universidad Iberoamericana Torreón	Torreón
Lobos UAdeC	Universidad Autónoma de Coahuila	Saltillo
Osos UANE	Universidad Autónoma del Noroeste	Saltillo
Troyanos UDEM	Universidad de Monterrey	San Pedro Garza García
Tuzos UAZ	Universidad Autónoma de Zacatecas	Zacatecas

== See also ==
- Organización Nacional Estudiantil de Fútbol Americano
