= Organization of Catholic Universities in Latin America and the Caribbean =

Catholic higher education organization based in Latin America and the Caribbean

Organization of Catholic Universities in Latin America
- Organización de Universidades Católicas de América Latina y el Caribe (Spanish)
- Abbreviation: ODUCAL
- Formation: 1953
- Headquarters: Rua Marquês de São Vicente, 225, Gávea, Rio de Janeiro, RJ, Brasil
- President: Pe Anderson Antonio Pedroso
- Parent organization: International Federation of Catholic Universities
- Website: https://oducal.com

The Organization of Catholic Universities in Latin America (Organización de Universidades Católicas de América Latina y el Caribe, ODUCAL) is a Catholic higher education organization established in 1953.

== History ==
The idea of uniting the Catholic universities of Latin America was adopted in the context of the post-World War II period. Relevant congresses for the advancement of this idea were the 1948 and 1951 Interamerican Congresses for Catholic Education, and the 1952 Congress of the World Federation of Catholic Universities (a precursor to the International Federation of Catholic Universities). ODUCAL was formally established in 1953 by rector of the Pontifical Catholic University of Chile and Archbishop of Concepción Alfredo Silva Santiago.

== Presidents ==
- Msr. Alfredo Silva Santiago (1953 - 1967) - Rector of the Pontifical Catholic University of Chile
- Msr. Octavio Nicolás Derisi (1967 - 1985) - Rector of the Pontifical Catholic University of Argentina
- R.P. Fray Aníbal Ernesto Fosbery, O.P. (1985 - 1987) - Rector of the Saint Thomas Aquinas University of the North
- Dr. Juan Alejandro Tobías (1987 - 2006) - Rector of the University of Salvador
- Msr. Alfredo Horacio Zecca (2006 - 2009) - Rector of the Pontifical Catholic University of Chile
- Dr. Pedro Pablo Rosso (2009 - 2015) - Rector of the Pontifical Catholic University of Chile
- Pbro. Lic. Francisco Ramírez Yáñez (2015 - 2021) - Rector of the Universidad del Valle de Atemajac
- Pe Anderson Antonio Pedroso (2021–present) - Rector of the Pontifical Catholic University of Rio de Janeiro

== Members ==
=== Andes ===
Bolivia
- Bolivian Catholic University San Pablo
Colombia
- Fundación Universitaria Católica del Norte
- Luis Amigó Catholic University
- Institución Universitaria Salazar y Herrera
- Pontificia Universidad Javeriana
- Universidad Pontificia Bolivariana
- Universidad Católica de Manizales
- Universidad Católica de Oriente
- Universidad Católica de Pereira
- Universidad Mariana
- Universidad Santo Tomás
- La Salle University, Colombia
- Universitaria Agustiniana
- Catholic University of Colombia
- Universidad de San Buenaventura
- Fundación Universitaria Católica Lumen Gentium
- Corporación Universitaria Minuto de Dios
- Fundación Universitaria Juan de Castellanos
- Fundación Universitaria Monserrate
- Corporación Universitaria Lasallista
- Fundación Universitaria Católica del Sur
- Fundación Universitaria Cervantes San Agustín
- Fundación Universitaria Claretiana
- Universidad La Gran Colombia
Ecuador
- Pontifical Catholic University of Ecuador
- Politecnica Salesiana University
- Universidad Técnica Particular de Loja
- Universidad Católica de Cuenca
Peru
- Pontifical Catholic University of Peru
- Antonio Ruiz de Montoya University
- Universidad Católica de San Pablo
- Universidad Católica de Santa María
- Universidad Católica Santo Toribio de Mogrovejo
- Women's University of the Sacred Heart
- Catholic University of Trujillo
- Universidad Privada de Tacna
- Universidad Católica Sedes Sapientiae
- Universidad Católica Los Ángeles de Chimbote
Venezuela
- Universidad Católica Cecilio Acosta
- Catholic University of Tachira

=== Brazil ===
- Universidade La Salle
- Pontifical Catholic University of Goiás
- Pontifical Catholic University of São Paulo
- Pontifical Catholic University of Paraná
- Pontifical Catholic University of Minas Gerais
- Pontifical Catholic University of Rio Grande do Sul
- Pontifical Catholic University of Rio de Janeiro
- Centro Universitário FEI
- Dom Bosco Catholic University
- Catholic University of Pernambuco
- Centro Universitário São Camilo
- Faculdade Santa Marcelina

=== Southern Cone ===
Argentina
- Universidad Católica de Salta
- Universidad Católica de Santa Fe
- Universidad del Norte Santo Tomás de Aquino
- Universidad del Salvador
- Universidad Católica de La Plata
- Pontifical Catholic University of Argentina
- Universidad Católica de Córdoba
- Universidad Católica de Cuyo
Chile
- Duoc UC
- Pontifical Catholic University of Chile
- Pontifical Catholic University of Valparaíso
- Alberto Hurtado University
- Universidad Católica Silva Henríquez
- Catholic University of the Most Holy Conception
- Catholic University of the Maule
- Catholic University of the North
- Temuco Catholic University
Paraguay
- Universidad Católica Nuestra Señora de la Asunción
Uruguay
- Catholic University of Uruguay

=== Mexico, Central America and the Caribbean ===
Costa Rica
- Catholic University of Costa Rica
Cuba
- Instituto de Estudios Eclesiásticos P. Félix Varela
El Salvador
- Universidad Don Bosco
- Universidad Católica de El Salvador
Guatemala
- Universidad Mesoamericana
- Rafael Landívar University
Nicaragua
- Universidad Católica Redemptoris Mater
- Universidad Juan Pablo II
Haiti
- Université Notre Dame d'Haïti
Honduras
- Universidad Católica de Honduras
Mexico
- Universidad del Valle de Atemajac
- Universidad Cristóbal Colón
- Universidad Anáhuac México
- Universidad La Salle México and its campi
- Universidad de la Arquidiócesis de Monterrey
- Tamaulipas Institute of Higher Education
- Universidad Intercontinental
- University of Monterrey
- Universidad Marista de Guadalajara
- Universidad Marista de Querétaro
- Universidad Marista de la Ciudad de México
- Simón Bolívar University (Mexico)
- Universidad Popular Autónoma del Estado de Puebla
- Universidad Vasco de Quiroga
- Universidad San Pablo
- Anahuac University Network
- Pontifical University of Mexico
- Universidad Motolinía del Pedregal
Panama
- Universidad Católica Santa María La Antigua
Puerto Rico
- Pontifical Catholic University of Puerto Rico
- Universidad Central de Bayamón
- Universidad del Sagrado Corazón de Puerto Rico
Dominican Republic
- Pontificia Universidad Católica Madre y Maestra
- Universidad Católica Santo Domingo
- Universidad Católica Tecnológica de Barahona
- Universidad Católica del Cibao
- Universidad Católica del Este
