= National Technological Institute of Mexico =

Mexican public university system

Coordinates: 19.4275°N 99.1485°W

- Tecnológico Nacional de México
- Type: Public
- Established: 24 July 1948
- Budget: Mex$15,381,000,000 (2014)
- Officer in charge: Ramón Jiménez López
- Students: 620,000 (2019)
- Location: Coyoacán, Mexico City, Mexico
- Campus: 263 across Mexico (2014)
- Website: tecnm.mx

The National Technological Institute of Mexico (in Spanish: Tecnológico Nacional de México, TNM) is a Mexican public university system created on 23 July 2014 by presidential decree. At the time of its foundation, the Institute incorporated the 263 former Institutes of Technology that had been created since 1948; first under the patronage of the National Polytechnic Institute (IPN) and, since 1959, directly dependent of the Secretariat of Public Education (SEP).

== Campuses ==
The Institute has 264 campuses across Mexico including:

Mexican state	Campus (date of foundation)
Aguascalientes	Aguascalientes, Pabellón de Arteaga, El Llano
Baja California	Ensenada (1997), Mexicali (1981), Tijuana
Baja California Sur	La Paz, Los Cabos
Campeche	Campeche, Chiná, Lerma
Chiapas	Comitán, Tapachula, Tuxtla Gutiérrez
Chihuahua	Chihuahua (1948), Chihuahua II, Ciudad Cuauhtemoc, Ciudad Juárez (1964), Ciudad Jiménez, Delicias, Parral
Coahuila	Saltillo (1951) La Laguna (1965) Instituto Tecnológico de Torreón
Colima	Colima
Durango	Durango (1948), El Salto, Valle del Guadiana
Guanajuato	Celaya (1958), Uriangato (1997)
Guerrero	Acapulco, Iguala, Chilpancingo, San Marcos
Michoacán	Morelia (1964), Jiquilpan (1976), Zamora (1994), Apatzingán (1994), Ciudad Hidalgo, Tacambaro (2002)
Nayarit	Bahía de Banderas, Nayarit North, Nayarit South, Tepic
Nuevo León	Linares, Nuevo León (1976)
San Luis Potosí	Ciudad Valles, Matehuala, San Luis Potosí, Rioverde
Oaxaca	Oaxaca (1968)
Puebla	Puebla (1972)
Querétaro	Querétaro (1967), San Juan del Río (1988)
Quintana Roo	Cancún
Sinaloa	Culiacán, Los Mochis, Mazatlán
Sonora	Agua Prieta, Guaymas, Huatabambo, Hermosillo, Nogales (1975), Valle del Yaqui
Tabasco	Villahermosa (1974)
Tamaulipas	Altamira, Mante, Ciudad Madero (1950), Ciudad Victoria, Matamoros, Nuevo Laredo, Reynosa
Estado de México	Toluca (1972)
Veracruz	Minatitlán, Boca del Rio, Orizaba, Xalapa
Zacatecas	Zacatecas
