= List of schools in Mexicali =

This is a List of schools in Mexicali, Baja California.

According to a previous census conducted by the INEGI (Instituto Nacional de Estadística y Geografía) in 2008, the number of students who have graduated from Mexicali's public and private schools are as follows:

Pre-scholar students: 18,648
Primary school students: 17,272
Secondary school students: 12,337
Technical education students: 531
Baccalaureate students: 6,152

Some public universities in the city include Autonomous University of Baja California, Campus Mexicali, Universidad Politécnica de Baja California and the Instituto Tecnológico de Mexicali. Private universities include Centro de Enseñanza Técnica y Superior, Universidad del Valle de México and Universidad Xochicalco.

== Schools ==
- Colegio CIDEA
- Autonomous University of Baja California, Campus Mexicali
- CETYS Universidad
- Instituto Tecnológico de Mexicali
- Universidad De Negocios ESCOMEX
- UNIVER Mexicali
- Tecnológico de Baja California
- Universidad Politécnica De Baja California
- Universidad Xochicalco Campus Mexicali
- Universidad del Valle de México Campus Mexicali
- Benemérita Escuela Normal Urbana Federal Fronteriza
- Colegio de Bachilleres del Estado de Baja California
- Instituto Salvatierra Cacita
- Bachillerato Universitario
- CECyTE
- Colegio de las Americas
- Instituto Felix De Jesus Rougier
- Colegio Anglo Americano de Nuestra Señora de la Paz
- Instituto Pedagógico Auditivo Oral A.C.
- Colegio Americano de Mexicali
- Colegio Frontera
- Escuela Superior de Comercio Exterior
- Colegio México Americano
