= Corral (surname) =

Corral is a surname. Notable people with the surname include:

- Alejo Corral (born 1981), Argentine rugby union player
- Álvaro Corral (born 1983), Spanish footballer
- Charlyn Corral (born 1991), Mexican footballer
- Daniel Corral (born 1990), Mexican gymnast
- Daniel Corral (composer) (born 1981), American composer and musician
- Eduardo C. Corral (born 1973), American poet
- Frank Corral (born 1955), Mexican player of American football
- George Corral (born 1990), Mexican footballer
- Imanol Corral (born 1994), Spanish footballer
- Javier Corral Jurado (born 1966), Mexican politician, former governor of Chihuahua
- José Andrés Corral Arredondo (1946–2011), Mexican Roman Catholic bishop
- Leticia Corral (born 1959), Mexican mathematician
- Manuel Corral (1934–2011), Spanish antipope
- Matías Corral (born 1968), Argentine rugby union player
- Matt Corral (born 1999), American football player
- Oscar J. Corral (born 1974), American journalist
- Pablo Corral (born 1992), Chilean footballer
- Pablo Corral Embade (born 1972), Spanish Paralympic swimmer
- Ramón Corral (1854–1912), Vice President of Mexico
- Ramón Corral Ávila (born 1946), Mexican lawyer and politician
- Raquel Corral (born 1980), Spanish synchronized swimmer
- Ray Corral (born 1973), American mosaic artist, designer, and entrepreneur
- Rodrigo Corral, American graphic artist
- Samuel Corral (born 1992), Spanish footballer
- Simón Corral (born 1946), Ecuadorian poet and dramatist
- Valerie Corral (born 1953), American cannabis activist
- Victor Corral (born 1936), Ecuadorian Roman Catholic bishop
