= ITCM =

ITCM may refer to:

- Instituto Tecnológico de Ciudad Madero
- Inter-Tribal Council of Michigan
- Indigenous Technology Cruise Missile
- improved time-shifting correction method
