= Corrall =

Corrall is a surname. Notable people with the surname include:

- Percy Corrall (1906–1994), English cricketer
- Sheila Corrall (born 1950), American academic

== See also ==
- Corral (surname)
