= Isit =

ISIT or Isit may refer to:

- Isit, Russia, a rural locality in Sakha Republic, Russia
- Instituto Superior de Intérpretes y Traductores, a private university in Mexico City
- ISIT, Institute of Intercultural Management and Communication, a French Grande Ecole
- International Symposium on Information Theory, an IEEE symposium
