= Leticia Corral =

Mexican mathematician and materials scientist (b 1959)

Leticia Corral Bustamante
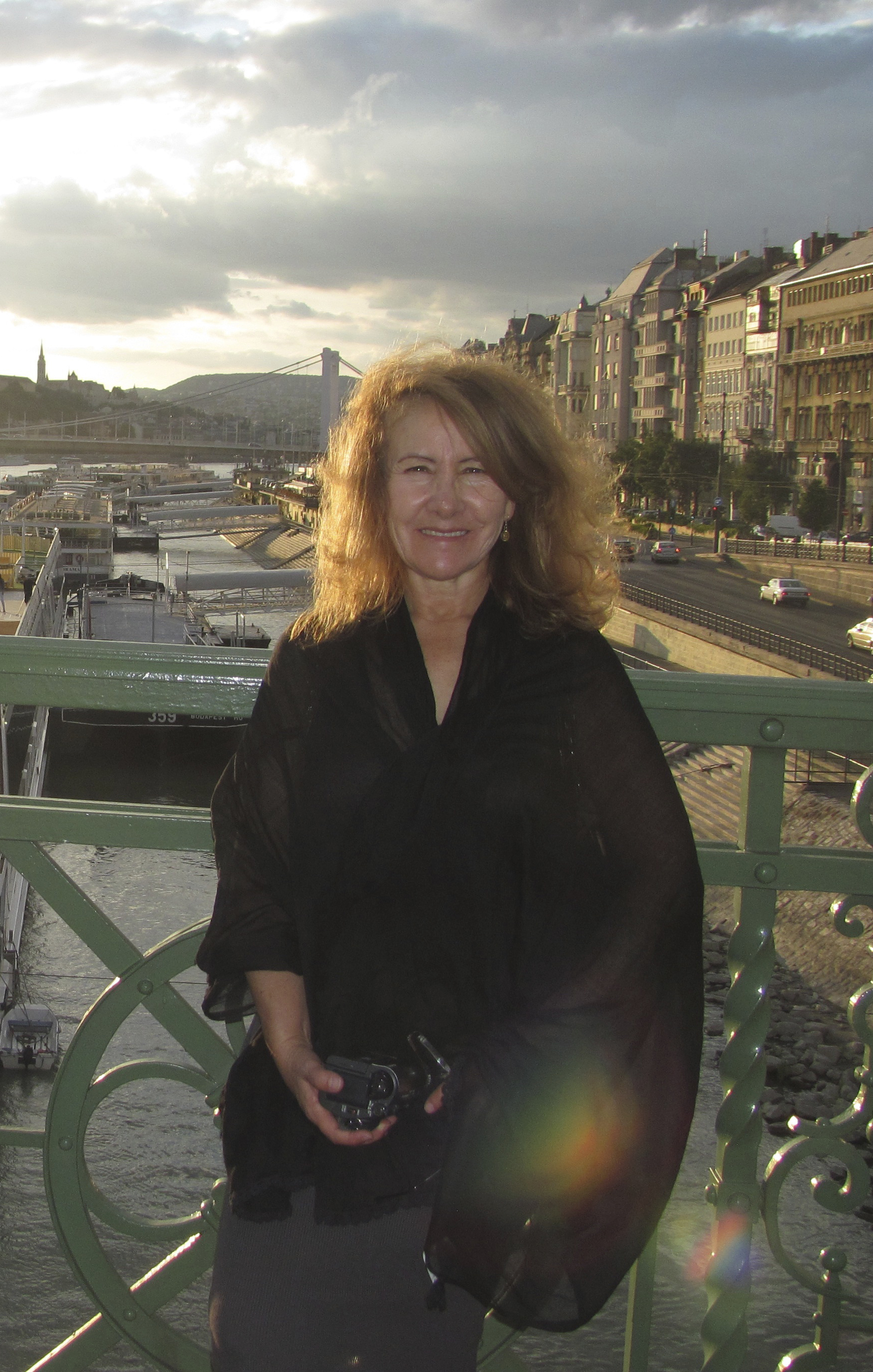
- Born: March 16, 1959 (age 67); Ciudad Cuauhtémoc, Chihuahua, Mexico
- Education: Chihuahua Institute of Technology; Center for Advanced Materials Research (CIMAV)
- Occupations: Scientist, professor
- Years active: 24

Leticia Corral (born March 16, 1959) is a Mexican mathematician, astrophysicist and materials scientist.

== Early life and education ==
Corral was born in Ciudad Cuauhtémoc in the northern state of Chihuahua.

She earned a degree in industrial chemical engineering from the Chihuahua Institute of Technology, a master's degree in mathematics from CINVESTAV, and a Ph.D. in materials science from the Center for Advanced Materials Research (CIMAV) in Chihuahua. She also completed postdoctoral work at CIMAV's Monterrey campus.

== Career ==
Corral is a research professor at the National Technological Institute of Mexico and the Institute of Technology of Ciudad Cuauhtémoc. Her current research focuses on astrophysics, particularly the mathematics of general relativity, black holes and wormholes, the origins of the universe, and Sir Roger Penrose's theories of cosmology.

She presented a paper titled "Matemáticas Aplicadas a los Materiales" at the School of Mechanical & Manufacturing Engineering in Dublin in 2003, and "Modelling heat transfer in work rolls of a continuous hot strip mill, Part I" in 2005 at City, University of London. The latter was published as a chapter of the book Mathematical Modelling: Education, Engineering and Economics. In Istanbul in 2012, she presented research conducted with three generations of mechatronics students at the Institute of Technology of Ciudad Cuauhtémoc, titled "Diseño de un robot mecatrónico para dar terapia y remover tumores". She received the 2013 Chihuahua Award in Technological Sciences for this work.

In 2009, the Scientific Committee of the 5th International Conference on Diffusion in Solids and Liquids gave her the Joseph Fourier Award for her research on heat transfer into black holes. Since then, she has published several articles on Penrose's cosmic censorship hypothesis; on energy transfer and fluid flow around massive astrophysical objects; and on modelling the structure of wormholes, virtual particles from the Big Bang, and mass transfer in the Higgs boson.

Her research on the Higgs boson, which she presented in Vilamoura, Portugal, in 2011, predicted with high accuracy the mass of the Higgs boson. Her prediction was identical to the value later reported on July 4, 2012, by the ATLAS and CMS experiments at the Large Hadron Collider.

At Imperial College London on July 2, 2015, Corral presented a model that, using relativistic equations, predicted very low entropy at the Big Bang. Her theory disagreed with the phase-space volume posited by Stephen Hawking, who, Corral said, did not take into account the asymmetrical component of time when calculating the entropy in the Big Bang singularity, that work was not published in a specialized scientific journal nor peer reviewed. However, it matched Penrose's Weyl curvature hypothesis, which does take that into account. As such, she is a supporter of the cyclic model of the Universe, in which the initial conditions match the final ones. However there's not any academic paper published by her on a Astrophysics journal, also the claimed scientific achievements are not supported or recognized by the scientific community.

== Awards ==
Corral received various awards for her contributions to science including, notably, the Joseph Fourier Award in 2009, for her scientific contributions in the understanding of solid and liquid diffusion.

== Industrial property ==
In 2020, Leticia Corral was one of the holders of an industrial design registration granted by the Mexican Institute of Industrial Property (IMPI), under file number MX/2020/84324. The design was developed in collaboration with students from the National Technological Institute of Mexico, Cuauhtémoc campus, including:

- Hortencia Mendoza Olivas
- Andrea Aragonez Aguirre
- Francisco Alexis Cordero Zúñiga
- Jorge Uriel Acosta Arévalo
- Irvin Eduardo Parra Domínguez
- Andrea Jaquelyn Lam Bencomo
- Álvaro Adrián Pavón González
- José Ramón Acosta Cerda
- Paúl Eduardo Hernández Ríos
- Sergio Ruelas Ledezma

This registration is part of a technological innovation project in the medical field, focused on the functional design of devices related to oncology treatments.
