= Universidad Intercontinental =

Private Catholic University in Mexico City

Intercontinental University
- Universidad Intercontinental
- Seal of the Intercontinental University
- Motto: Ducit et Docet ("Conduce y Enseña")
- Motto in English: "Guides and Teaches"
- Type: Private
- Established: 1976; 50 years ago
- Religious affiliation: Guadalupe Missionaries
- Academic affiliations: CONADEIP, CONDDE, IFCU
- Dean: Father Juan Corona
- Location: Mexico City, D.F., Mexico; 19.280°N 99.171°W
- Campus: Urban, 42.5 acres (17.2 ha)
- Colours: Yellow and green
- Nickname: Wild Swans
- Website: www.uic.edu.mx

The Universidad Intercontinental (commonly known as UIC; in English: Intercontinental University) is a private Catholic University, located in Mexico City. Founded in 1976 by Guadalupe Missionaries and being one of the only six Mexican universities in the International Federation of Catholic Universities (IFCU).

With historical strengths in dentistry, Psychology, and Pedagogy, it is one of the top Mexican universities in these fields.

World leaders in the area of communications such as Rodrigo Flores López, Alfonso de Anda and Adriana Sodi majored from Universidad Intercontinental.

== See also ==
- List of universities in Mexico
