= Alfonso de Anda =

Mexican TV show host (born 1974)

Alfonso De Anda
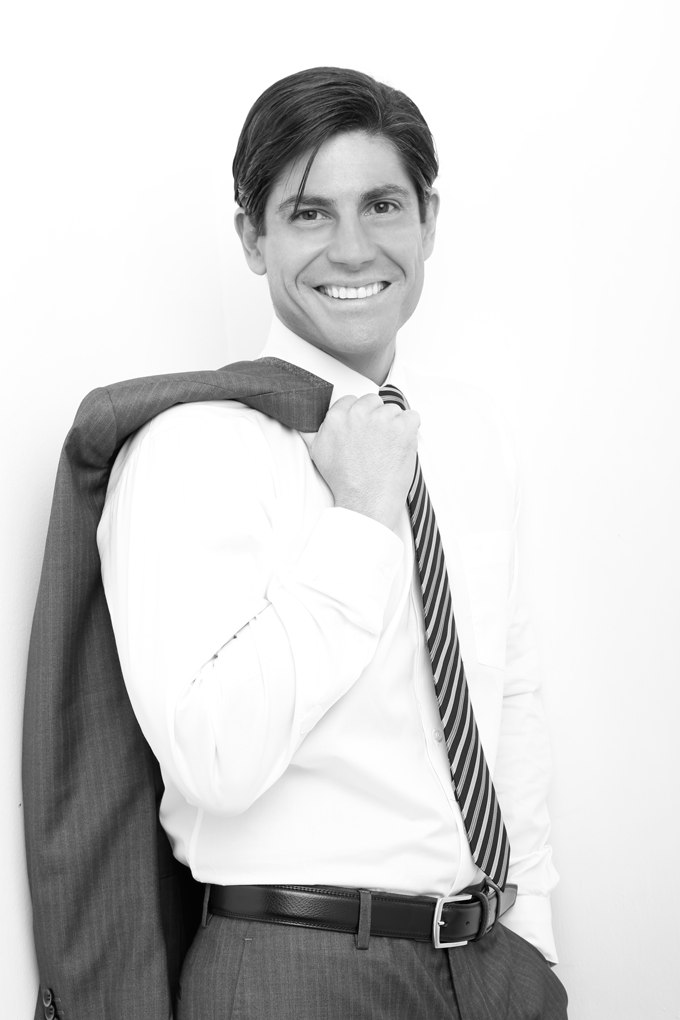
- Alfonso de Anda (TV Personality)
- Born: Alfonso De Anda; July 25, 1974 (age 52); Mexico City, Mexico
- Other name: a.k.a. Poncho de Anda
- Occupation: TV Host / Personality
- Website: http://www.ponchodeanda.net

Alfonso de Anda aka Poncho de Anda (born July 25, 1974) is a Mexican TV show host.

== Biography ==
Alfonso de Anda is a popular television host in U.S.-based Spanish-language television. Born in Mexico City, De Anda began his communication carrier in 1996 as a DJ for Grupo Radio Centro's Alfa 91.3 FM, one of the most successful radio stations in the region, where he eventually became a producer and host of his own shows. He later went to work at TV Azteca, serving as a television personality for the network's entertainment show "Estudio Siete (Studio Seven) and the video music show "Alfa Dance".

In 2001, de Anda moved to the United States as the main anchor of Telemundo's "MUN2 TV" edgy entertainment show “Fuzión” (Fusion). While working for Telemundo from 2001-2009 Poncho served as the co-host of Emilio's Estefan reality show “Nuevas Voces de América,” bringing to the viewers every detail related to the show. He also served as the host of the entertainment segments for Telemundo morning newscast “Hoy En El Mundo”, and the co-host of the morning variety shows “De Mañanita" and "Cada Dia”.

He also hosted different Telemundo special events, such as the red carpet for the Billboard Latin Music Awards, the Miss Universe Broadcast, Live Earth and the Macy's Thanksgiving Day Parade, among others.

On September 7, 2010 Poncho de Anda became the co-host of Univision Network's top rated, three-hour live morning program, “Despierta América” (Wake-Up America) and in 2011 he hosted the reality show “Dale Con Ganas” (Give It Your All), an inspiring weight-loss reality challenge program from the creator and executive producer of “The Biggest Loser,” Dave Broome and executive producer Emilio Estefan. That same year he also hosted Univision's 49th broadcast of the Tournament of Roses Parade live from Pasadena California.

In 2013 Alfonso de Anda Hosted the first season of El Factor X, the United States Spanish-language edition of the FremantleMedia "The X Factor" franchise for MundoFox Network.

Alfonso served as co-host of "Venga La Alegría" and "Soy tu Doble VIP" at TV Azteca in México and Azteca America in The U.S. territory between 2013-2016.

As an interviewer and throughout his career, Poncho has interviewed some of the biggest celebrities and personalities in the entertainment industry such as Shakira, Ricky Martin, Gloria Estefan, Enrique Iglesias, Antonio Banderas, Tom Hanks, Will Smith, Robert De Niro and Metallica among others.

In recognition of his achievements, de Anda was honored with the 2011 and 2014 People en Español's "Best TV Host" award, “Sin Límite” (Without Limits) award for best Hispanic television host in the United States in 2008, and he was also included in People en Español's 50 Most Beautiful Special Edition.

De Anda holds a bachelor's degree in communications from Mexico's Universidad Intercontinental (Intercontinental University), as well as a diploma from the Université Du Quebec (University of Quebec). He resides in Miami since 2001 and is married to Colombian painter Lina Amashta, with whom he has two children (Daniel and Valeria).

== Professional career ==
=== Radio ===
- Alfa Radio 91.3 (1996-1997) Grupo Radio Centro

=== Television ===
- Mira quien Baila (2015) Univisión
- No Pierdas el Billete (2015) TV Azteca / Azteca America
- Soy tu Doble (2014) TV Azteca / Azteca America
- Venga la Alegría (2014) TV Azteca / Azteca America
- Miss Universe (2005, 2006, 2007, 2008 and 2016) Telemundo Azteca America
- Ecomentes (2014) Discovery
- El Factor X (2013) FreeMantle Media/ MundoFOX
- Dale Con Ganas (2012) Univisión
- Despierta América (2010-2012) Univisión
- Desfile de las Rosas (2010-2011) Univisión
- Los nominados a Premios lo Nuestro (2011) Univisión
- Paparazzi TV (2009-2010) Mega TV
- Los Implicados (2009) Mega TV
- Cada Día (2005-2008) Telemundo
- Miss Universe (2005-2008) Telemundo
- La alfombra roja de Los Premios Billboard a la Música Latina (2005-2008) Telemundo
- Nuevas Voces de América (2005-2008) Telemundo
- De Mañanita (2004-2005) Telemundo
- Hoy en el Mundo (2001-2004) Telemundo
- Fuzión (2001) Mun2
- Estudio Siete (1999-2001) TV Azteca
- Alfa Dance (1997-1998) TV Azteca
