= Universidad Interglobal =

Universidad Interglobal (The Interglobal University) is a Mexican private institution with six campuses located in Guerrero, Mexico City, State of Mexico, Hidalgo, Querétaro, and Yucatán. The university offers study plans for regular students, students that work in the mornings, and for people who are only available on weekends.

== Departments ==
- Administration of business
- Law
- Pedagogy
- Psychology
- Information technology

== See also ==
- List of universities in Mexico
