= Instituto Tecnológico Superior de Zacapoaxtla =

Coordinates: 19.8319°N 97.5712°W

Higher Technological Institute of Zacapoaxtla
- Instituto Tecnológico Superior de Zacapoaxtla
- Motto: Hacia la excelencia, con calidez humana y calidad integral "Towards excellence, with human kindness and integral quality"
- Type: Public
- Established: 1996
- President: Manuel Enrique Mauleón Yáñez
- Administrative staff: 93 (2004)
- Undergraduates: 500 (2000)
- Location: Zacapoaxtla, Puebla, Mexico
- Website: www.itsz.edu.mx

The Higher Technological Institute of Zacapoaxtla (In Spanish: Instituto Tecnológico Superior de Zacapoaxtla, ITSZ) is a public, coeducational university located in the city of Zacapoaxtla, Puebla, Mexico.

It was founded on June 1, 1996. Just barely after three years of existence, the institution saw itself providing help and leadership during the disaster that occurred in the northern part of the state of Puebla due to heavy rainfalls brought by the Tropical Depression Eleven that caused flooding, landslides and much destruction in the early days of October 1999. The institution helped to provide relief to local and neighboring communities that suffered great loss of life and property. Much of the research carried on by the institution focuses on the ecology of the region.
