= TecMilenio University =

Mexican university system

Coordinates: 19.5006°N 99.1756°W

Tecmilenio University
- Universidad Tecmilenio
- Type: Private
- Established: 2002
- Affiliations: Monterrey Institute of Technology and Higher Education
- Rector: Bruno Zepeda
- Students: 60,000+
- Location: Monterrey, Nuevo León (main campus)
- Campus: 30 across Mexico
- Website: www.tecmilenio.mx

The Universidad Tecmilenio (UTM) (Tecmilenio University) is a Mexican private university. It is a sister organization of the Monterrey Institute of Technology and Higher Education. The university has 30 locations and an online campus. It has more than 60,000 students at its high school, undergraduate, and postgraduate levels, frequently through distance learning.

The university offers undergraduate and master's programs in law, business, marketing, finance, psychology, tourism, engineering, information technology, and computer science.

== Campuses ==
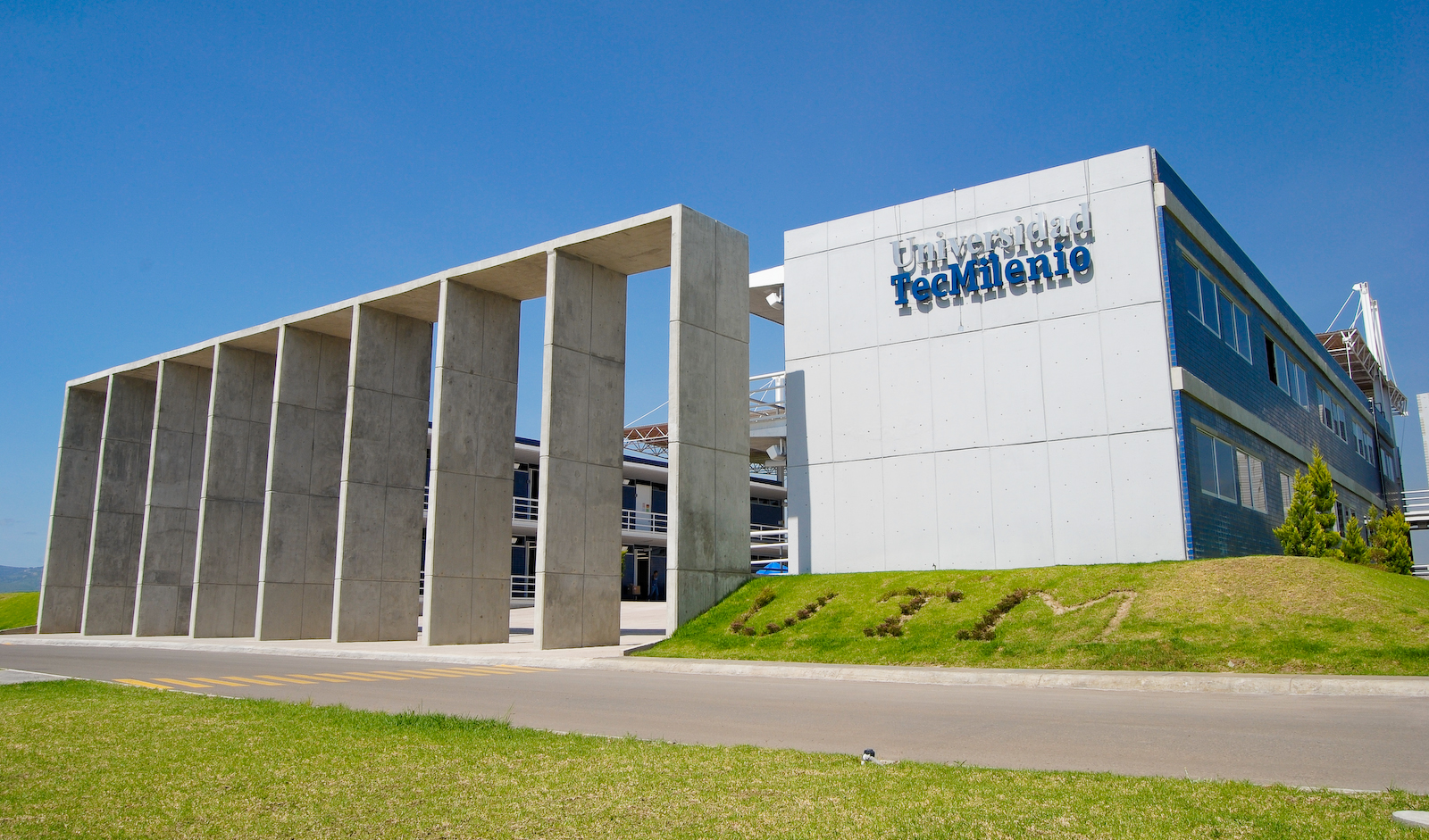
A Tecmilenio campus

As of 2009, the university has 30 campuses across several Mexican cities.

- Chiapas
  - Tapachula
- Chihuahua
  - Camargo
  - Chihuahua
  - Cuauhtémoc
  - Ciudad Juárez
  - Parral
- Coahuila
  - Torreón (Laguna)
- Colima
  - Colima
- Durango
  - Durango
- Jalisco
  - Guadalajara (Guadalajara, Guadalajara Executive)
  - Zapopan
- Mexico City
  - Ferrería and Reforma
- Michoacán
  - Morelia
- Morelos
  - Cuautla
  - Cuernavaca
- Nuevo León
  - Guadalupe
  - Monterrey (Cumbres, Las Torres)
  - San Nicolás de los Garza
  - Santa Catarina
- Puebla
  - Puebla
- Querétaro
  - Querétaro
  - San Juan del Río
- Quintana Roo
  - Cancún
- San Luis Potosí
  - San Luis Potosí
- Sinaloa
  - Culiacán
  - Los Mochis and Mazatlán
- Sonora
  - Guaymas
  - Hermosillo
  - Navojoa
  - Ciudad Obregón
- State of Mexico
  - Tecoac
  - Cuautitlán Izcalli and Toluca
- Tabasco
  - Villahermosa
- Tamaulipas
  - Matamoros
  - Reynosa
- Veracruz
  - Veracruz
- Yucatán
  - Mérida

According to John Auters of the Financial Times, most campuses lack extracurricular activities and sports facilities to lower costs.

== Organization ==
A national rectorate is based in Monterrey, Nuevo León, and oversees eight vice-rectorates:

- Two internal vice-rectorates are in charge of academics and internal affairs.
- Five regional vice-rectorates are in charge of all campuses in the northern, eastern, southern, and western areas and the Monterrey metropolitan area.
- A vice-rectorate specializes in distance education programs.

As of 2019, the rector is Bruno Zepeda, overseen by David Garza Salazar, current president of Tecnológico de Monterrey.

== Programs ==
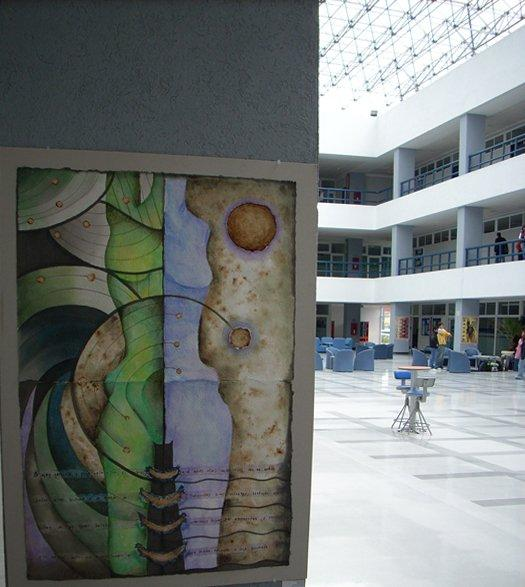
Interior of the Cuautitlán Izcalli campus, with an exhibit by artist Citlalli Arreguín co-sponsored by Garros Galería.

Tecmilenio University offers traditional and bilingual careers in health sciences, humanities and social sciences, engineering, business, and information technology. The master's degrees cover three areas of study — humanities, business, and information technology — and finally, continuing education includes courses, seminars, and certifications, among others.

== Ranking ==
According to the 2011 university ranking in the journal College Guide from the editors of Reader's Digest, Tecmilenio University is among the top nine universities in Mexico.

1. Universidad Nacional Autónoma de México 1910
2. Instituto Tecnológico y de Estudios Superiores de Monterrey 1943
3. Instituto Politécnico Nacional 1936
4. Universidad Iberoamericana 1943
5. Instituto Tecnológico Autónomo de México 1946
6. Universidad Anáhuac 1964
7. Universidad Tecmilenio 2002
8. Universidad de Guadalajara 1791
9. Universidad Autónoma Metropolitana 1973

== Controversies ==
=== Sexual abuse of an underage student with a disability ===
On March 11, 2025, a group of five students sexually assaulted another 16-year-old student with attention deficit hyperactivity disorder inside one of the restrooms at the Las Torres High School campus in Monterrey, Nuevo León. On March 14, three days after the incident, students on campus protested with banners against the incident, expressing solidarity with the victim after he had been suspended for three days for defending himself during the attack and demanding that educational authorities ensure that the case does not go unpunished. The Nuevo León Attorney General's Office reported that agents had gone to the school to begin their investigation. Subsequently, the Public Ministry received a complaint along with the investigation file. Through his social media accounts, Nuevo León Governor Samuel García reported that he was aware of the case and in contact with the relevant authorities, requesting clarification and stating that follow-up would be provided.

However, on September 2025, the Fiscalía General de Justicia de Nuevo León and the institution have determined that the five students did not deserve any kind of punishment for the sexual assault of 16 year old Rudy, due to the lack of evidence, and due to the fact the story did not happen as told.
