= XHELI-FM =

Radio station in Morelia, Michoacán, Mexico

Morelia, Michoacán, Mexico; Mexico
- Frequency: 98.1 MHz
- Branding: UVE Radio

Programming
- Format: Mexican college

Ownership
- Owner: Universidad Vasco de Quiroga, A.C.

History
- First air date: March 2015
- Call sign meaning: MorELIa

Technical information
- Class: B1
- ERP: 15 kW
- HAAT: 12.9 m
- Transmitter coordinates: 19°40′32″N 101°10′50″W

Links
- Website: www.uveradio.com

XHELI-FM is a Mexican college radio station owned by the Universidad Vasco de Quiroga, a Catholic university in Morelia, Michoacán, Mexico. It broadcasts on 98.1 FM.

== History ==
XHELI received its permit in July 2013. The station signed on in March 2015, with an opening ceremony including a formal blessing by Archbishop Alberto Suárez Inda. In September 2017, the IFT authorized a power and class increase to 15 kW.
