= Ramón Corral Ávila =

Mexican politician and lawyer

- Born: 8 December 1946 (age 79); Hermosillo, Sonora, Mexico
- Occupations: Lawyer and politician
- Political party: PAN

Ramón Corral Ávila (Note: In this Mexican name, the surname is Corral and the second or maternal family name is Ávila.) (born 8 December 1946) is a Mexican lawyer and politician affiliated with the National Action Party (PAN).

Corral Ávila, a native of Hermosillo, Sonora, was elected to a plurinominal seat in the Chamber of Deputies in the 1997 mid-terms, where he served during the 57th Congress. In the 2000 general election, he was elected to a six-year term as a senator for the state of Sonora.

In 2003, he fought the gubernatorial election in his home state on the PAN ticket but narrowly lost to Eduardo Bours of the Institutional Revolutionary Party (PRI).

Ramón Corral Ávila is the great-grandson of Ramón Corral Verdugo, who served as vice-president under Porfirio Díaz.
