= Instituto Tecnológico Superior de Xalapa =

University in Xalapa, Veracruz, Mexico

Coordinates: 19.5029°N 96.8807°W

The Instituto Tecnológico Superior de Xalapa is a university in the city of Xalapa, Veracruz, Mexico.

== See also ==
- National Technological Institute of Mexico
