= Guadalupe Missionaries =

Roman Catholic missionary society in Mexico

Guadalupe Missionaries (Spanish: Misioneros de Guadalupe, official name: Spanish: Instituto de Santa María de Guadalupe para las Misiones Extranjeras), also known by their abbreviation MG, is a Roman Catholic missionary society in Mexico. It was founded on October 7, 1949. The headquarters are located in Mexico City The members of the Society are secular and devote their lives to the mission Ad gentes.

The first Superior General of the Society was Bishop Alonso M. Escalante, a Mexican who worked previously for years in China and Bolivia.
