= Centro Universitario de Investigaciones Bibliotecológicas =

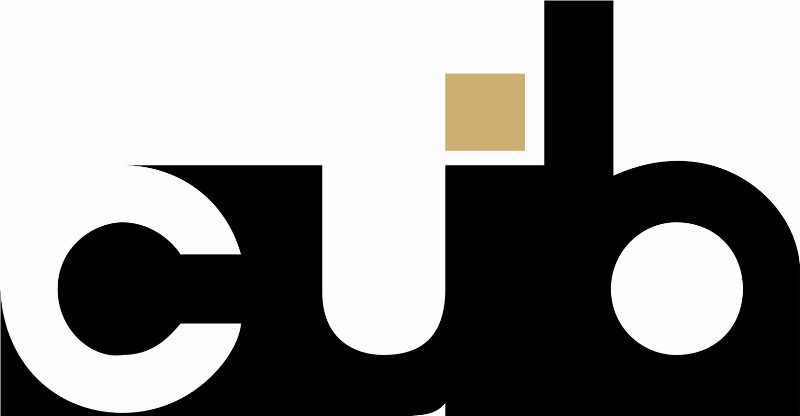
- Other name: CUIB
- Type: Research
- Established: 14 de diciembre de 1981
- Director: Dr. Jaime Ríos Ortega
- Location: Torre II de Humanidades pisos 11 al 13, Circuito interior Ciudad Universitaria, Coyoacán, C.P. 04510, Mexico, Ciudad de México
- Campus: Ciudad Universitaria (Campus principal)
- Website: cuib.unam.mx

The Centro Universitario de Investigaciones Bibliotecológicas (CUIB) of the Universidad Nacional Autónoma de México (UNAM), was created on December 14, 1981 according to the creation agreement, signed by the Dean PhD. Octavio Rivero Serrano. Its goal is theoretical and applied research on phenomena related to the information registered on printed forms and other media: its sources, selection and acquisition, its organization and representation, in addition to the problems concerning the media, processes and technologies used for the storage, recover and distribution of the information.

== History ==
The CUIB had its antecedent on a Research Program, coordinated by the Dirección General de Bibliotecas (DGB) of the UNAM. In that program, they studied particular problems and phenomena observed in librarianship; besides, there was no institution in México dedicated to carry out researches on this discipline. That is why, a group of researchers, under the leadership of PhD. Adolfo Rodríguez Gallardo, created it.

PhD. Adolfo Rodríguez Gallardo was the first Director, in charge from December 1981 to January 1985, later, the CUIB direction was under the PhD. Estela Morales Campos (from February 1985 to August 1992), following PhD. Elsa M. Ramírez Leyva (from August 1992 to August 2001), PhD. Filiberto Felipe Martínez Arellano (from August 2001 to August 2009). By now, since August 21, 2009, PhD. Jaime Ríos Ortega is the header master.

Today, after twenty-nine years of its foundation, the CUIB has become a leading institution in its field in both Mexico and in Latin America and it is highlighted by the variety of their projects and research activities, which cover five areas of interest, namely:

1st Area: “Foundation of Library and Information Science”, with two research lines: Social-Historic Foundation and Ethic Foundation.

2nd Area: “Information and Society”, with five research lines: Educate to Inform, Librarianship History, Studies of Communities and Social Groups, Reading, and Information: Policies and Legislation.

3rd Area: “Information Systems”, with three research lines: Information Sources, Informetrics, and Information Users.

4th Area: “Documental Information Analysis and Systematize”, with three research lines: Classification Systems, Languages for Information Searches, and Information Systematization.

5th Area: “Information technology”, with two research lines: Conceptual Framework of the Information Technologies and Evolution of the Information Technologies.

CUIB researchers develop constantly, theoretical and practical solutions and proposals about facts, problems and society issues related to books, reading, information and libraries.

== Magazine ==
The published results of research projects and other contributions lead to the enrichment of librarianship literature; due to before CUIB, the Spanish editions on library and information issues were limited. This Center also publishes a quarterly serial called “Investigación Bibliotecológica”, which has been published without interruption for more than twenty years. Well known researchers from Mexico and other countries have also participated.

The CONACYT (Consejo Nacional de Ciencia y Tecnología) has rated “Investigación Bibliotecológica” in the first places between other national publications related to Social Sciences and Humanities, and its included in the UNAM's Catalogo de Revistas Científicas y Arbitradas (Scientific and Refereed Publications Catalog), and main national and international indexes, as Revistas Mexicanas Científicas y Tecnológicas Index, Social Sciences Citation Index, LISTA, LISA, ISA,Latindex, CLASE, INFOBILA and SciELO México.

== Human resources ==
Nowadays the CUIB's research staff has twenty-three full-time researchers, from which the 91% are PhD. They are also members of the Sistema Nacional de Investigadores. Two of them, have been admitted as members of the Academia Mexicana de las Ciencias. (Scientists from different areas of pure sciences as well as social sciences and humanities are part of this Academy).

== Teaching ==
Based on an agreement dated in 1999 between the Center and the Facultad de Filosofía y Letras of the UNAM, CUIB's sixteen researchers have been teaching some courses in the program of bachelor's degree “Licenciatura en Bibliotecología y Estudios de la Información”.

The CUIB is also responsible for the “Programa de Posgrado en Bibliotecología y Estudios de la Información”, (“Postgraduated's Program in Librarianship and Information Studies”) which trains masters and doctors in this discipline.

The doctorate program in Bibliotecología y Estudios de la Información is one of the six that are offered in Latin America and one of the two that are developed in Spanish. There are twenty-one of the PhD researchers who are teaching the courses in both programs. It's important to note that, this program has been recognized by the Consejo Nacional de Ciencia y Tecnología de México as one of its academic excellence programs. Since 2006, this program facilitates an on line education system as a distance educational model.

For librarian's lifelong learners, the Center offers continued education, specialization and actualization courses with national and international teachers.

== Researchers ==
Dr. Alfaro López, Héctor Guillermo Investigador
Q.F.B..Almada Navarro, Margarita Investigador
Dra. Cabral Vargas, Brenda Investigador
Dr. Calva González, Juan José Investigador
Dra. Escalona Ríos, Lina Investigador
Dra. Fernández Esquivel, Rosa Ma. Investigador
Dra. García Aguilar, María Idalia Investigador
Dr. Garduño Vera, Roberto Investigador
Dr. Gorbea Portal, Salvador Investigador
Dra. Hernández Salazar, Patricia Investigador
Dr. Martínez Arellano, Filiberto Felipe Investigador
Dra. Morales Campos, Estela Investigador
Dra. Naumis Peña, Catalina Investigador
Dra. Ramírez Leyva, Elsa Margarita Investigador
Mtro. Ramírez Velázquez, César Augusto Investigador
Dr. Rendón Rojas, Miguel Ángel Investigador
Dr. Ríos Ortega, Jaime Investigador
Dr. Rodríguez Gallardo, Adolfo Investigador
Dr. Rodríguez García, Ariel Alejandro Investigador
Dra. Russell Barnard, Jane Margaret Investigador
Dr. Sánchez Vanderkast, Egbert John Investigador
Dra. Torres Vargas, Georgina Araceli Investigador
Dr. Voutssás Márquez, Juan Investigador

== The directors of the CUIB ==
Dr. Jaime Ríos Ortega Investigador 2009-
Dr. Filiberto Felipe Martínez Arellano Investigador 2001-2009
Dra. Elsa Margarita Ramírez Leyva Investigador 1992-2001
Dra. Estela Morales Campos Investigador 1985-1992
Dr. Adolfo Rodríguez Gallardo Investigador 1981-1985
