= Ray Corral =

American mosaic artist

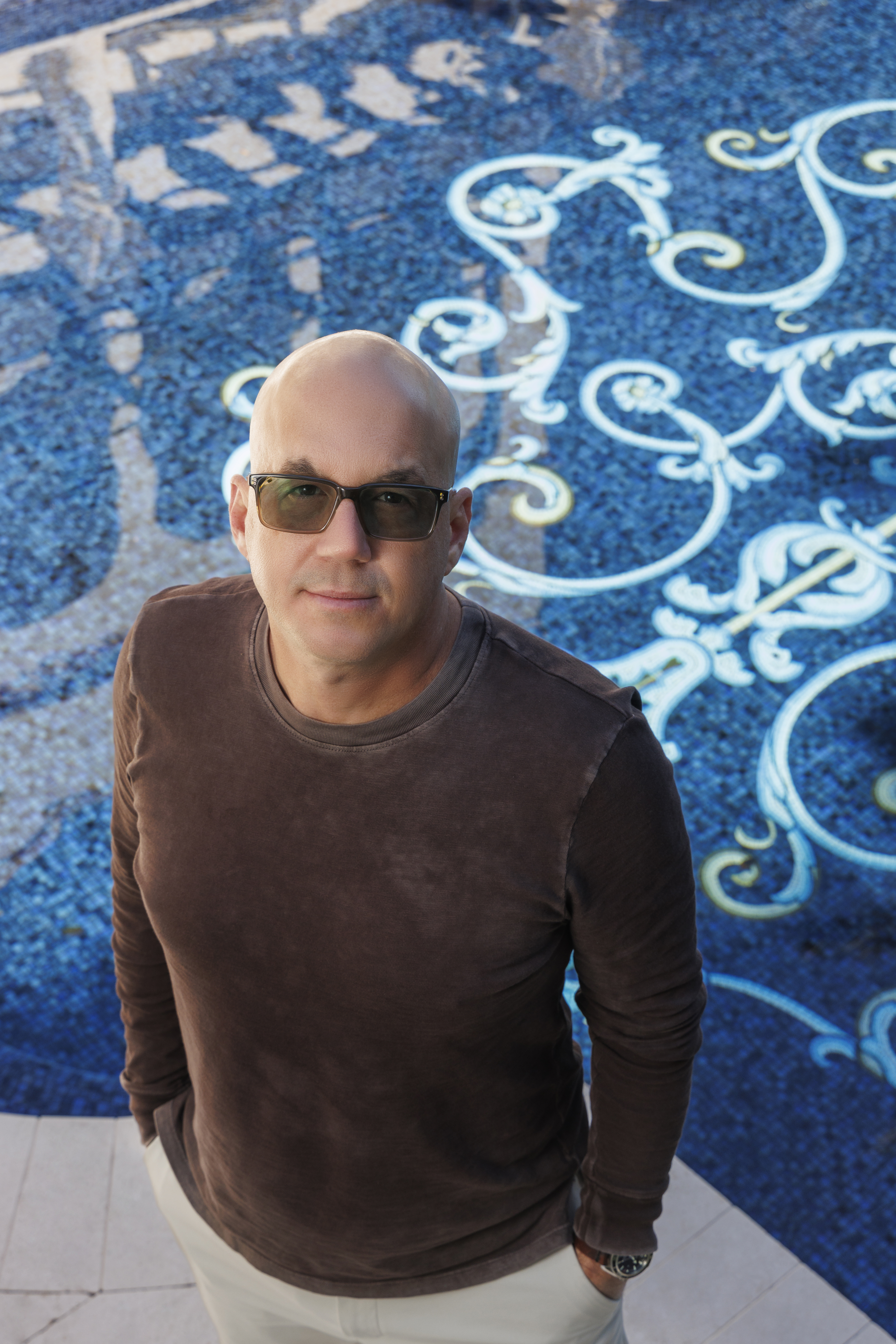
- Born: August 31, 1973 (age 52); Miami, Florida, U.S.
- Occupations: Mosaic artist, entrepreneur
- Known for: Founder of Mosaicist, Inc.
- Website: Official website

Ray Corral (born August 31, 1973) is an American mosaic artist, designer, and entrepreneur based in Coral Gables, Florida. Through his company, Mosaicist, Inc., he has created mosaic designs and completed for over 650 swimming pools and outdoor applications worldwide, using hand-cut glass tesserae. He is the founder and creative director of Mosaicist, Inc.

== Early life ==
Corral was born in Miami, Florida. In the 1990s, he worked in the music industry and collaborated with producer Ish Ledesma. During this period, he performed with artists including Madonna, who discovered him while he was performing in a nightclub in South Beach, Miami. Notable figures such as Gloria Estefan and Julio Iglesias later became among his earliest mosaic clients. His credits from this period include work associated with the album The Sun Is Going Down Over the Bay, which is documented in the music database AllMusic.

== Career ==
In 1999, Corral transitioned to mosaic art and began producing installations for residential and architectural projects.

To further develop his skills, he apprenticed with mosaicists Luigi Scodeller and Giuseppe Semeraro, studied and instructed at the Scuola Mosaicisti del Friuli in Spilimbergo, Italy. Scodeller, an Italian master with over fifty years of experience, trained Corral in Mexico in traditional techniques including hand-cutting tesserae. Corral's work frequently employs the Cosmati technique, named after the Roman family that constructed decorative church floors from geometric mosaics beginning in the 12th century. His work combines traditional mosaic techniques with contemporary architectural design, spanning residential and architectural applications.

Corral founded Mosaicist, Inc., a Miami-based company that designs and installs custom mosaic artworks. He has completed commissions for private clients, including projects involving historically designated properties. A notable project includes a large glass mosaic rooftop mural at the St. Regis Resort in Longboat Key, described as the largest rooftop glass mosaic mural in the United States, consisting of over 1.3 million hand-placed glass mosaic tiles. International projects include a mosaic installation at Tucker's Town, Bermuda, created in collaboration with architects Linberg and Simmons, featuring underwater scenes of sea turtles integrated with the surrounding landscape. Other projects include a Miami Beach collaboration with David and Isabela Grutman for their private residence featured in Architectural Digest, and a Frank Lloyd Wright-inspired pool remodel completed in collaboration with pool architect Randy Angell and builder Guy Wood.

Corral's mosaic installations have been covered in regional and industry publications, including Architectural Digest, Coral Gables Magazine, Global Miami Magazine, Pool Magazine, Florida Design, Aqua Magazine, Luxury Pools Magazine, Elle Decor, Haute Living, Home Design Magazine, and Gulfshore Life. In December 2025, the Italian pool-industry journal Piscine Oggi featured Mosaicist on its cover.

== Civic involvement ==
Corral serves on the Board of the Lowe Art Museum at the University of Miami and the Art Advisory Board of the City of Coral Gables. He has also been involved in arts-related initiatives in Coral Gables, including those associated with the Coral Gables Community Foundation and the Lowe Art Museum.

Through the Coral Gables Foundation, he established the Mosaic Art Fund, a grant program designed to support visual artists.

He is also a contributor to the Forbes Business Council, where he writes about creative business and entrepreneurship.

== Technique ==
Mosaicist uses primarily glass tesserae, which Corral considers more durable than stone for subaqueous applications. He uses mathematical calculations to account for optical distortion at varying water depths, adjusting the scale and proportions of designs so they appear accurate when viewed through water.
