= Puebla Institute of Technology =

Coordinates: 19.0698°N 98.1688°W

- Instituto Tecnológico de Puebla
- Motto: Excelencia tecnológica con participación humana
- Type: Public
- Established: September 2nd, 1972
- Affiliations: ANUIES TecNM
- Academic staff: 298
- Students: 8,322 (2019)
- Location: Puebla, Puebla, Mexico
- Campus: 63.25 acres (25.60 ha); Urban
- Colors
- Mascot: Lion
- Website: puebla.tecnm.mx

The Puebla Institute of Technology (Spanish: Instituto Tecnológico de Puebla) is a public higher education institution in Puebla, Mexico, founded in 1972. It operates under the Secretariat of Public Education and offers nine undergraduate and three graduate programs in engineering, technology, and management. The institute is a member of the National Technological Institute of Mexico and the National Association of Universities and Higher Education Institutions (ANUIES).

== Campus ==
The Puebla Institute of Technology's main campus is located in the city of Puebla, with an enrollment of approximately 8,322 students (as of 2019). It also has a branch in Acajete, Puebla, with around 150 students.

The campus features gardens and a wide variety of trees across the institution. It includes around 60 buildings, several engineering laboratories, an Information Center (library), and a Foreign Language Center, which provides students with training in English, French, German, and Spanish for foreign students.
