= Instituto Superior de Intérpretes y Traductores =

Coordinates: 19.3411°N 99.1343°W

- Motto: Comunicación entre culturas (Communication Among Cultures)
- Type: Private
- Established: 1964
- President: Ximena Iglesias Carrillo (principal)
- Academic staff: 200
- Undergraduates: Translation, Interpretation, and Languages
- Postgraduates: Terminology, Diplomatic Studies, and Translation and Interpretation on Comparative Law
- Location: Mexico City, Mexico
- Campus: Urban
- Website: isit.edu.mx

The Instituto Superior de Intérpretes y Traductores, S.C. (in English: Superior Institute of Interpreters and Translators), commonly known as ISIT, is a private university located in Mexico City, Mexico. It focuses on interpretation and translation, and it became the first institution in the Americas to academically acknowledge these disciplines as bachelor degrees.

ISIT has worked along with Fondo de Cultura Económica (Economic Culture Fund), the Instituto Nacional de Bellas Artes (National Institute of Fine Arts), Asociación de Escritores de México (Writers Association of Mexico) and the National Autonomous University of Mexico (UNAM). It is also a member of the American Translators Association.

It relies on Spanish, English, French, Portuguese and Italian for fields such as automotive, Chemistry, Engineering and Politics.

ISIT's library stores 2500 volumes, 250 videocassettes, 90 audio cassettes and 20 maps, and it is recognised by UNAM's Centro Universitario de Investigaciones Bibliotecológicas.
