= Universidad Politécnica de Baja California =

Mexican University

Polytechnic University of Baja California
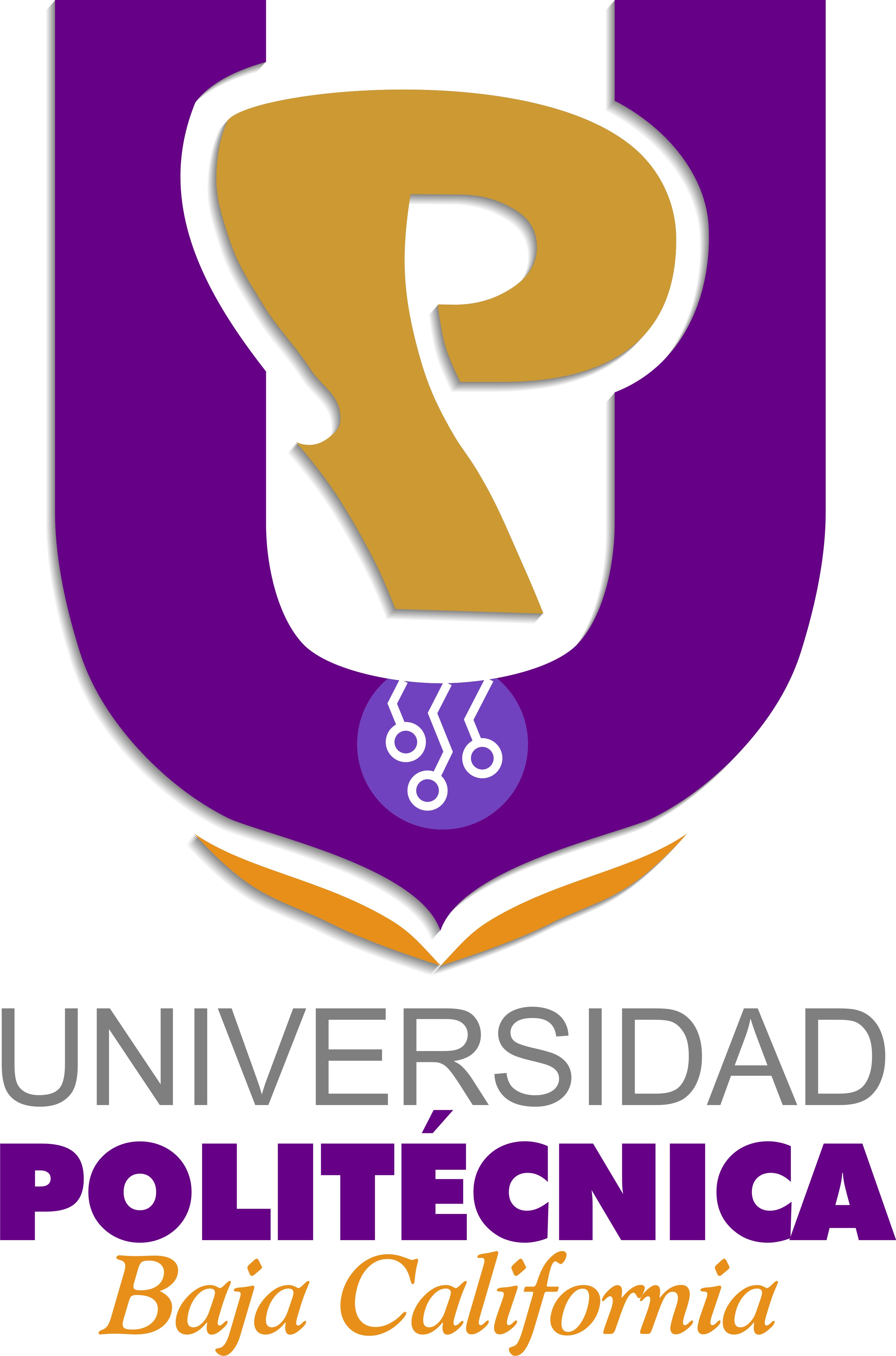
- Other name: UPBC
- Type: Public state
- Established: January 9, 2006
- Rector: Dr. Marcela Barreras Hernández
- Students: 1,911 in 2025
- Location: Av. Claridad S/N, colonia Plutarco Elías Calles. CP. 21378, Mexicali, Baja California, Mexico; 32.625923468292875°N 115.37699020086764°W
- Colors: Purple and Gold
- Mascot: Peregrine falcon
- Website: www.upbc.edu.mx

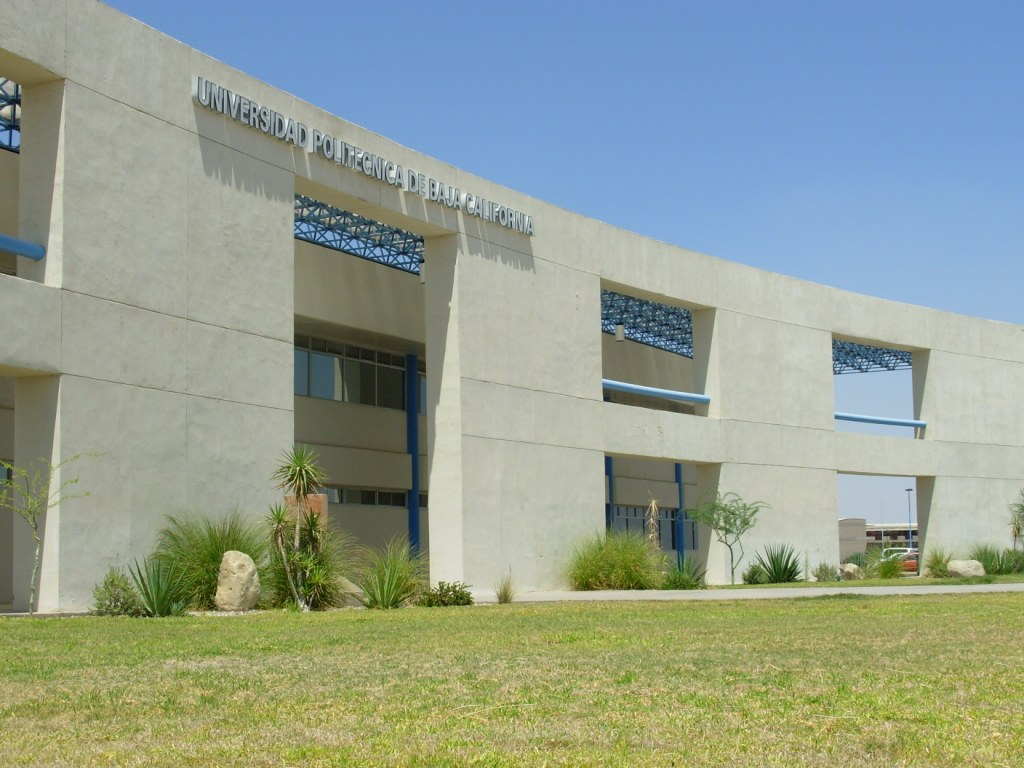
UPBC academic building.

The Polytechnic University of Baja California (Spanish: Universidad Politécnica de Baja California, UPBC) is a public higher education institution that is part of the technological and polytechnic universities subsystem of Mexico, located in the city of Mexicali, Baja California. It was established as a decentralized agency of the state government by executive decree on January 9, 2006 —published on January 13 in the official newspaper of the state— and began academic activities that same year.

The university aims to provide higher education at the levels of associate degree (Técnico Superior Universitario - TSU, the Mexican equivalent), bachelor's degree, technological specialization and other graduate studies, in addition to offering continuing education courses in various formats. Its educational offerings focus primarily on engineering programs, designed to respond to technological demands and the productive sector. UPBC is dedicated to the development and progress of society through three substantive areas: teaching, research and extension.

Academic activities began on May 29, 2006 at 291 Industria Street, in a borrowed building, with an initial enrollment of 35 students.

Currently, the only campus of the Polytechnic University of Baja California is located in Mexicali. Its facilities include two academic buildings, a workshops and laboratories building, a library, and a third building under construction. The campus can accommodate up to 2,000 students in its current state, but its 20-hectare land allows the university to expand its facilities in the future. In 2022, UPBC had an enrollment of 1,547 students across all schedules.

== History ==
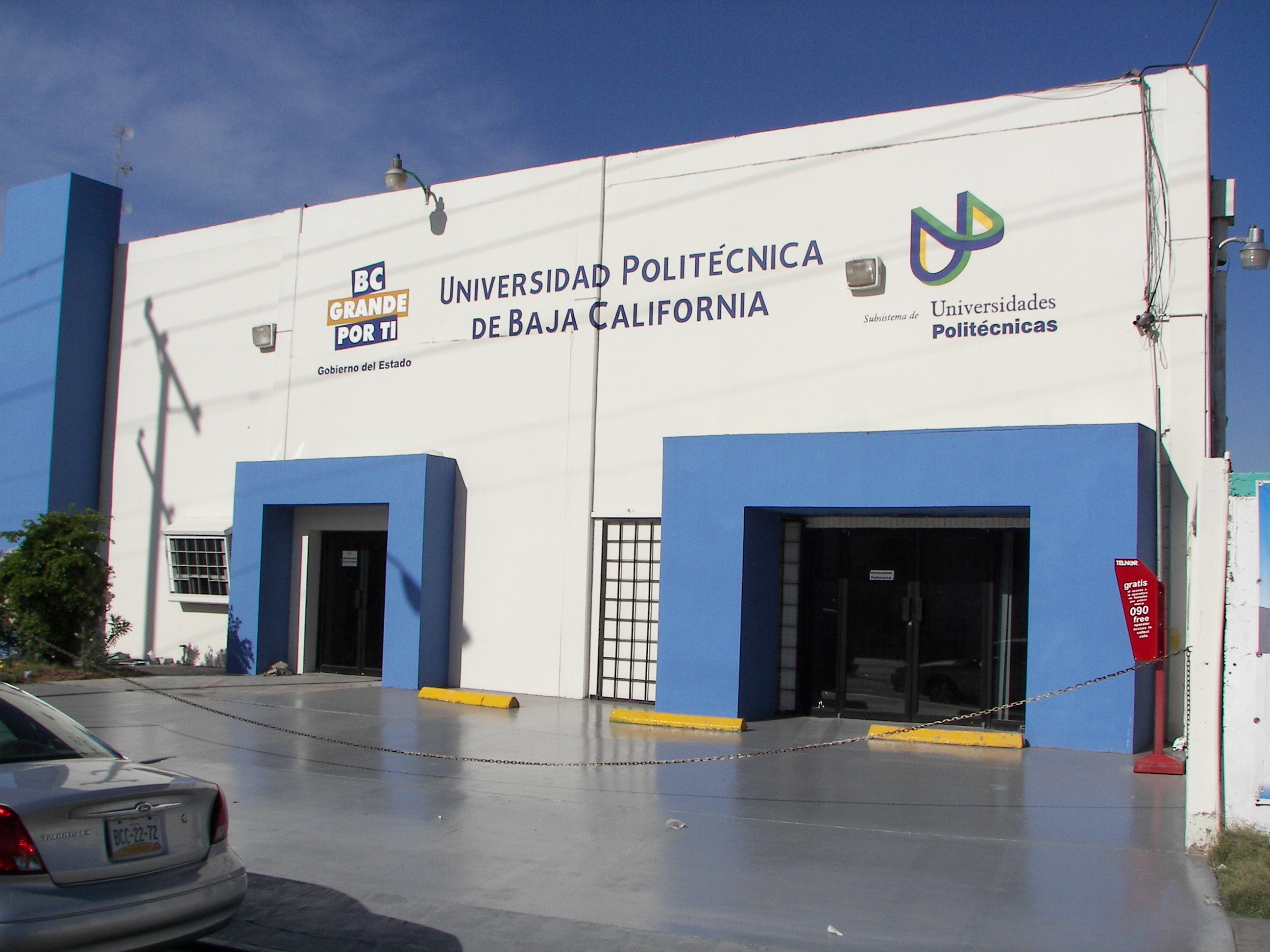
Facade of the first UPBC facilities on Industria Street number 296. This first infrastructure was provided by the State Educational System of the State Government.

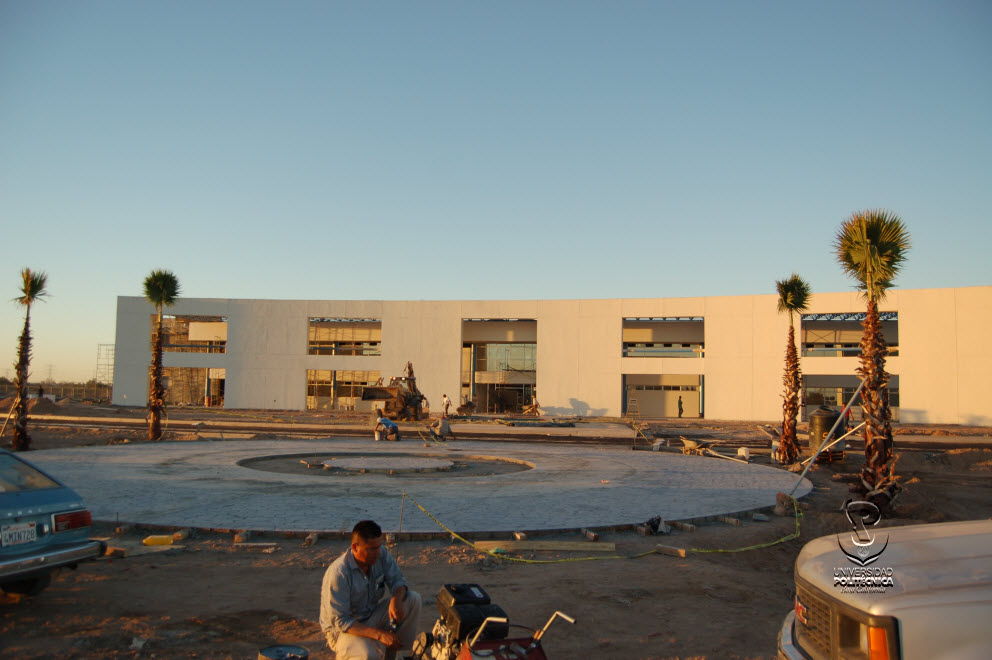
Construction of the first academic building of the Polytechnic University of Baja California in 2007.

The Polytechnic University of Baja California was established as a decentralized agency of the State of Baja California by executive decree signed on January 9, 2006 and published on January 13, 2006 in the Official Gazette of the State of Baja California. Subsequently, it began operations on May 29, 2006 in temporary facilities located in the Industrial neighborhood, in Mexicali, provided by the Institute of Educational and Pedagogical Services (ISEP). These facilities were adapted and equipped with six classrooms, two computer laboratories and a multipurpose room to begin its academic activities. In this initial period, the institution offered the educational programs of Manufacturing Technologies Engineering, Mechatronics Engineering and Information Technology Engineering, with a focus on training professionals in key areas for the technological and productive development of the region.

With the support of regulatory agencies in public investment and those responsible for educational infrastructure construction in the state, approval was obtained for the necessary funds for the development of the first academic building on the new campus. For this purpose, a master construction plan was developed that defined the strategic location of the building. Classes in this new infrastructure began on October 29, 2007.

On June 20, 2007, the Selection Committee, composed of university representatives, Board members and society members, unanimously selected the institutional logo designed by Marco Antonio Manríquez Curiel. This logo symbolizes the universality of knowledge through a book, technology represented by an electronic circuit and the Baja California peninsula, which identifies the institution and its regional context.

In 2008, the university consolidated its growth with the approval of resources for the construction of a new laboratories and workshops building, designed to meet the needs of practical and advanced training. Construction was completed in July 2009, strengthening the institution's capacity to serve a growing enrollment and modernize its academic programs.

In 2010, UPBC reached a new milestone by obtaining official registration from the Secretariat of Public Education (SEP) as a quality institution in technological higher education. This marked an important recognition of the joint effort of its university community, which has maintained a focus on academic excellence, innovation and commitment to regional development.

Subsequently, academic efforts and quality in serving the growing enrollment justified to the SEP and the State Government the need for a second teaching building. This project was completed in September 2010, consolidating the necessary infrastructure to meet educational and institutional development objectives.

In 2016, the Government of the State of Baja California, under the administration of then-governor Francisco Vega de Lamadrid, made the formal donation of the land where the university is located, thus transferring ownership from the state government to the institution itself. The donated properties, which together total approximately a little more than 20 hectares, are located on De la Claridad Avenue, no number, in the Plutarco Elías Calles neighborhood. This acquisition was required by the corresponding authorities at the time, so that the university could continue accessing public resources intended for its expansion and the construction of new facilities.

In 2024, the General Directorate of Technological and Polytechnic Universities carried out a restructuring of study plans in all institutions belonging to this subsystem at the national level. As part of this process, the Polytechnic University of Baja California found it necessary to update all of its study plans, with the objective of harmonizing them with those of the rest of the country. This measure sought to guarantee greater uniformity in teaching within the subsystem, as well as facilitate student mobility at the national level. While this harmonization already existed among technological universities, from that moment it was also extended to polytechnic universities. That same year, UPBC incorporated Associate Degree (Técnico Superior Universitario) programs for the first time, which represented a significant modification in its educational offerings.

== Educational Model ==
The Polytechnic University of Baja California has updated its educational model as of September 2024, with the objective of strengthening the professional training of its students and adapting to the new challenges of the labor market and technological demands. This model combines solid academic preparation, the development of practical competencies and the strengthening of values and attitudes necessary to excel in work environments.

=== Educational model stages ===
Associate Degree (Técnico Superior Universitario): During the first six quarters, students take specific subjects in their discipline from the beginning, without a common core. In addition, during the course of the sixth quarter, they complete a professional internship that allows them to acquire practical experience in the productive sector. After successfully completing this stage, they are awarded the Associate degree title.

Bachelor's Degree: Students who decide to continue their training can take three additional quarters of subjects, complemented with a second professional internship in the tenth quarter. This stage ends with obtaining the Bachelor's degree title, completing a total of 10 quarters (3 years and 4 months) to achieve both titles.

=== Educational model characteristics ===
The educational model is characterized by its focus on comprehensive training, promoting technical competencies, the development of attitudes and values that foster personal and professional growth. From the first quarter, students take specific subjects in their career, without a common core, and English is taught as a mandatory subject throughout the training. In addition, they participate in integrative projects that allow them to apply the knowledge acquired in a practical context aligned with the needs of the productive sector. This model stands out for its accelerated duration, allowing the obtaining of both titles, Associate Degree (Técnico Superior Universitario) and Bachelor's Degree, in a total period of 3 years and 4 months. Additionally, all full-time teachers have a minimum academic degree of master's, which ensures a level of teaching in accordance with established quality standards.

=== Competency-Based Model ===
The competency-based model of the Polytechnic University of Baja California is based on the comprehensive development of students through an approach that articulates four essential dimensions: being, knowing, knowing how to do and living together. This approach integrates skills, aptitudes, abilities, values, attitudes and knowledge, forming professionals with the competencies necessary to face the challenges of the work and social environment.

UPBC seeks to train highly competent professionals, capable of adapting to diverse and complex contexts. To achieve this, the model promotes autonomous learning, guided by teachers who guide and facilitate the training process, allowing the student to become an independent agent, prepared to design and execute innovative and impactful projects.

This educational model fosters personal and professional growth, while guaranteeing solid and practical academic training, aligned with current demands of the market and society.

== Educational offerings ==
As of September 2024, the university updated its educational offerings to align with the guidelines of the new educational model of universities in the technological subsystem. This model incorporates both Bachelor's degree and Associate Degree (Técnico Superior Universitario, the Mexican equivalent) programs, designed to respond to labor market demands and current technological challenges. Most of these programs are focused on engineering areas, reflecting the institution's commitment to training professionals in technical and specialized fields.

=== Bachelor's Degree and Associate Degree Programs ===
Below is the list of bachelor's degrees currently offered by the university and their linked Associate Degree programs.

Bachelor's Degree	Associate Degree
Animation and Visual Effects Engineering	Associate Degree in Audiovisual Production and 2D Animation
Energy and Sustainable Development Engineering	Associate Degree in Solar Energy; Associate Degree in Turbo Solar Energy; Associate Degree in Turbo Energy
Mechatronics Engineering	Associate Degree in Automation; Associate Degree in Electrical Installations; Associate Degree in Production Line Maintenance; Associate Degree in Optomechatronics; Associate Degree in Robotics; Associate Degree in Flexible Manufacturing Systems
Information Technology and Digital Innovation Engineering	Associate Degree in Data Science; Associate Degree in Software Development; Associate Degree in Virtual Environments and Business; Associate Degree in Digital Network Infrastructure; Associate Degree in Artificial Intelligence
Advanced Manufacturing Engineering	Associate Degree in Manufacturing Processes
Semiconductor Engineering	Associate Degree in Semiconductors
Industrial Engineering	Associate Degree in Quality Management Systems; Associate Degree in Plastic Molding; Associate Degree in Precision Machining
Administration	Associate Degree in Human Capital Management; Associate Degree in Entrepreneurship, Formulation and Project Evaluation
Education	Associate Degree in English Language Teaching
Gastronomy	Associate Degree in Gastronomy
Business and Marketing	Associate Degree in Marketing

According to the programs established in the review of the new educational model for technological and polytechnic universities, it is possible that in the future the university will offer new academic programs at the bachelor's degree and associate degree levels. Likewise, the implementation of more Associate Degree programs linked to the same bachelor's degree is contemplated, expanding the educational options available to students.

== Rectors ==
Rectors of the Polytechnic University of Baja California since its founding in 2006.

- Moises Rivas López (2006-2010)
- Navor Rosas González (2010-2014)
- Juan Jesús Algrévez Uranga (2014-2019)
- Jesús Esteban Castro Rojas (2020-2022)
- Marcela Barreras Hernández (2022-present)

== Certifications and accreditations ==
The University is an authorized subcenter for English language examinations by University of Cambridge.

It has recognition as a Local Academy CISCO, with which students can access updated curricular material and seek certification in computer networking technology with the endorsement of CISCO at the CCNA Exploration (Cisco Certified Network Associate) levels.

In addition, it has recognition as an IT Academy from Microsoft, thanks to this students can access curricular materials, online training and specialized software in order to achieve certification from Microsoft. It also has the Microsoft Campus Agreement license, to provide the most innovative Microsoft software for educational purposes.

Additionally, it offers its students the opportunity to become certified in Lean Six Sigma, in the Yellow, Green and Black Belt applications, due to the academic alliance with "Lean Six Sigma Institute".

In 2015, the University obtained CACEI accreditation for its Mechatronics Engineering program.

In 2019, the University obtained CONAIC accreditation for its Information Technology Engineering program.

== CADI (Self-Access Language Center) ==
The Self-Access Language Center (CADI) is a space specifically designed to support autonomous learning of a second language, offering resources, equipment and trained personnel to facilitate this process.

CADI provides students with the opportunity to learn English at their own pace, adapting to their needs, objectives and preferences, making them responsible for their own learning. Students have the freedom to decide when, what and how to study, in addition to setting their goals and planning the necessary actions to achieve them.

When required, students receive guidance from a specialized advisor, who helps them identify their needs and select the most appropriate material to achieve their objectives. One of the main advantages of CADI is that it fosters in students the development of autonomous learning skills, which will be useful throughout their lives.

In January 2007, the Polytechnic University of Baja California created the Self-Access Language Center as a resource to support language learning within the university community. Since its creation, CADI has offered students and the general public the opportunity to learn autonomously, following their own pace and using strategies that adapt to their learning style and specific interests. With the increase in the student population, CADI has expanded its facilities, services and equipment to offer a relevant, quality service that meets the needs of users.

CADI's mission is to provide users with spaces with didactic and technological resources that allow the development and strengthening of cognitive and cultural skills. With an ethical and quality approach, CADI promotes autonomy in English learning through the comprehensive training of responsible, independent people with initiative and awareness of their needs. It is considered an integral, innovative and formative part in meaningful English language learning, in alignment with institutional programs and objectives.

== Peregrine Falcon: University mascot ==
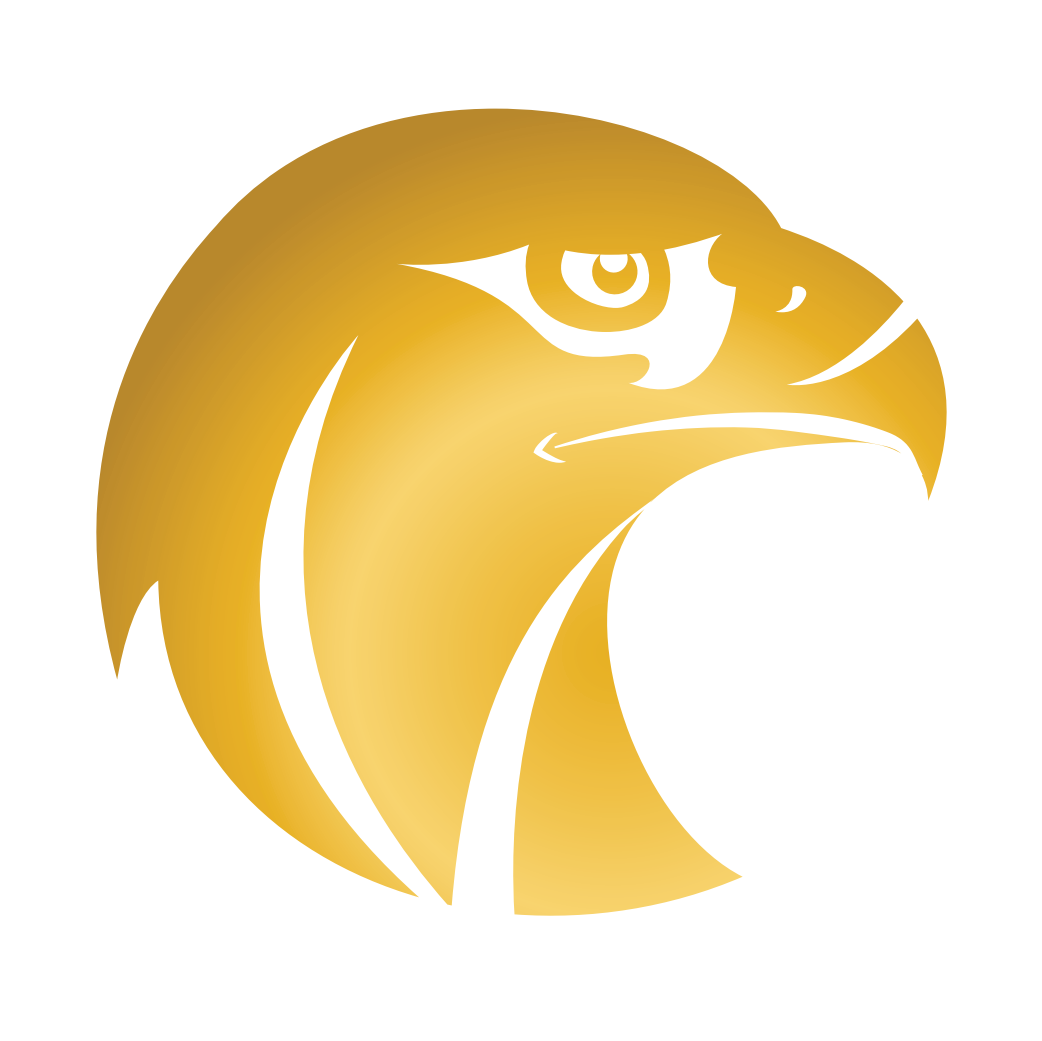
Illustrated design of the official mascot of the Polytechnic University of Baja California, the peregrine falcon.

=== History of mascot selection ===
In 2020, the student community of the Polytechnic University of Baja California participated in a consultation to choose the official mascot of the institution. Among the proposed options were three animals: the eagle, the owl and the peregrine falcon. After the voting process, on July 23 of that same year, the results were announced through the university's digital media, with the peregrine falcon winning with 53% of the votes. That same day, the logo of the new mascot was presented, which represents the head of a stylized peregrine falcon, with curved and angular lines, and in gold color.

=== Symbolism of the peregrine falcon ===
The peregrine falcon is one of the most emblematic birds in the world, considered the fastest bird, reaching up to 360 kilometers per hour during its hunting dives. Its anatomy is designed for speed and precision, with long and pointed wings, a muscular body and extraordinary vision that allows it to locate its prey from great distances. These characteristics make it a symbol of excellence, agility and focus, essential attributes in the academic and professional field.

Choosing the peregrine falcon as UPBC's mascot reflects the institutional values of perseverance, innovation and high performance.
