= Nogales Institute of Technology =

University in Sonora, Mexico

Coordinates: 31.2965°N 110.9566°W

- Instituto Tecnológico de Nogales
- Type: Public
- Established: 1975
- Principal: MC JOSÉ ESCARCEGA CASTELLANOS (Director)
- Location: Nogales, Sonora, Mexico
- Mascot: Colt

Nogales Institute of Technology (Spanish: Instituto Tecnológico de Nogales), or ITN, is a university located in Nogales, Sonora, Mexico.

== History ==
In 1975, on an international visit to Nogales, the President of Mexico, Luis Echeverría Álvarez met the President of the United States, Gerald Ford. At the end of the meeting, Álvarez made the official announcement, that a regional technological institute was approved for Nogales beginning in September of that year.

Work began October 1975 of what is now the top house studies, under the name Instituto Tecnológico Regional de Nogales, under the direction of Engineer Rafael Navarro Escobar. With a population of 224 students and 20 professors, the Institute offered specialties in Electromechanic Technician, Electronics Technician and Bachelor of Business Administration. The preparatory level offered the starting specialties: Accounting Technician, Chemistry Lab Technician and Electronics Technician.

In that year (1975), the Department of Planning and Development was formed, implementing guidelines on what should optimize the resources available for the future; the Coordination of Technical and Higher Studies, School Services and General Services were integrated. Offices of Public Relations and Editorial were established.

The expansion of the institution was initiated under the leadership of Engineer Escobar and the subdirectorate of Engineer, Fedaderico Campos Chacon, due to widespread demand giving a growth of 1566 students to the preparatory level and 222 students at the undergraduate level.

On November 20, 1975, the first board of the Regional Institute of Technology Nogales was formed. At the helm as President, Ernesto Elias Islands, as Secretary, Mendivil Francisco Estrada, as treasurer, Federico Campos Chacon; Dr. Jesus Martinez Ochoa as vice president and Gustavo Montalvo Pompa as prosecretary.

In 1979 the first 7 students graduated from the Institute, 2 in Industrial Engineering and 5 in Business Administration.

By 1982 and 1983, in an area of 7.9 hectares with the necessary buildings, workshops, laboratories and equipment, the school was operating with a student population of 2028 students, 54% in the undergraduate level and 46% in preparatory level, with 143 teachers and 110 administrative and service staff.

In 1984, a classroom was converted for use as a Computing Center and around mid-year Engineer Marcelino Bauzá Rosete replaced Engineer Almogábar Raul Sanchez as director, continuing as Deputy Director Eng. Jorge Garcia Revilla.

In 1985, D.G.I.T authorized the career in Computer Systems Engineering, starting with 23 students.

In 1985, the Administrative Building and Industrial Engineering Lab were opened. In November of that year, the word "Regional" was removed, becoming Instituto Tecnológico de Nogales.

== Consolidation ==
In 1986, the Master Plan for Institutional Development was drafted, searching for a new model for educational excellence to meet the social demands and development of higher education in technology. The establishment of the Center for Graduate and Research and Research-teacher Training Project were also studied.

In 1987, the D.G.I.T. authorized the unit in the Municipality of Agua Prieta, Sonora, as well as the Master of Computer System in the ITN, which began with 15 students. In August of that year, began the process of segregation of the high school level, suspending registrations for new students.

In early 1990 the functional units that made up the ITN were: Technical Studies Division, Division of Higher Studies, Outreach Division. Coordination of Research, Departments of Educational Technology, Center of Information, Planning, Budget Management, Human Resource Management, School Services, General Services, Communication and Broadcasting Offices and Publisher, and linkage with the productive sector.

In the same year (1990), the entire administrative team was broken into departments. That process meant to optimize and streamline administrative tasks in order to provide a firm support in the academic activities and quality standards.

On September 3, 1996, the D.G.I.T. appointed MS Oscar Armando Lopez Gonzalez as Director of the Instituto Tecnológico de Nogales, MS Juan de Dios Garcia Gerardo became the Academic subdirector and staying at their posts MS Eduardo Sanchez Arellano as an administrator subdirector and engineer Manuel de Jesus Ruiz Beltran in Department of Planning and Outreach.

In 1997, during the graduation ceremony for graduates of ITN, the segregation of Agua Prieta division was announced, to become Instituto Tecnológico de Agua Prieta.

In 2002, M.S Luis Armando Ramirez Cheu received the appointment as Director of the Instituto Tecnológico de Nogales, with the following staff: Academic Assistants: Engineer Luis Miguel Paz Moreno and MA. Jose A. Padilla Estrella, Administrative Assistants; B.S. Miguel A. Sarmiento Aguiar and B.S. Arana Guillermo Robles, Deputy Director of Plantation; Engineer Manuel de Jesus Ruiz Beltran and M.S. Gerardo Ochoa Salcido.

== Logo ==
The school logo was designed by Engineer Jorge Guillermo Zazueta, professor of Industrial Engineering in 1975.

The gear was selected to means movement and gestation, indicating the fundamental objectives of the Technological Institute of the region. The gear, divided into four parts by two axes, contain a transistor, a torch, a microscope and acronyms of the Instituto Tecnológico de Nogales.

The motto of the Institute is La Ciencia y tecnología para la liberación del hombre, which means Science and Technology for man's freedom.

== Careers ==
- Mechatronics Engineering
- Civil Engineering
- Industrial Engineering
- Electronic Engineering
- Computer Systems Engineering
- Semiconductors Engineering
- Business Administration
- Accounting
- Master's in Computer Systems
- Master's in Urbanism
