= Ensenada Institute of Technology =

Technology institution in Baja California, Mexico

- Instituto Tecnológico de Ensenada
- Motto: Por la Tecnología de Hoy y del Futuro "For today and future technology"
- Type: Public
- Established: 5 September 1997
- President: Valentín Arquímedes Sánchez Beltrán
- Location: Ensenada, Baja California, Mexico
- Website: https://www.ensenada.tecnm.mx/

The Ensenada Institute of Technology (Spanish: Instituto Tecnológico de Ensenada, ITE) is a college level technology institution located in the city of Ensenada, Baja California, Mexico. Inaugurated in 1997, the college is one of three regional institutes of technology part of the national system of institutes of technology in the Mexican state of Baja California.

== History ==
The Ensenada Institute of Technology began its activities on 5 September 1997, after nine years of operating as an Academic Unit of the Tijuana Institute of Technology. The demand of new options of higher education level to give support and service to the productive sector and the community and efforts of the board of teachers along with federal, state and municipal authorities led to the birth of this institute. Due to these reasons, the Ensenada Institute of Technology began offering higher education level courses, developing institutional integrity with the industrial private sector.

== See also ==
- Mexicali Institute of Technology
