= Chihuahua Institute of Technology =

University in Chihuahua, Mexico

- Instituto Tecnológico de Chihuahua
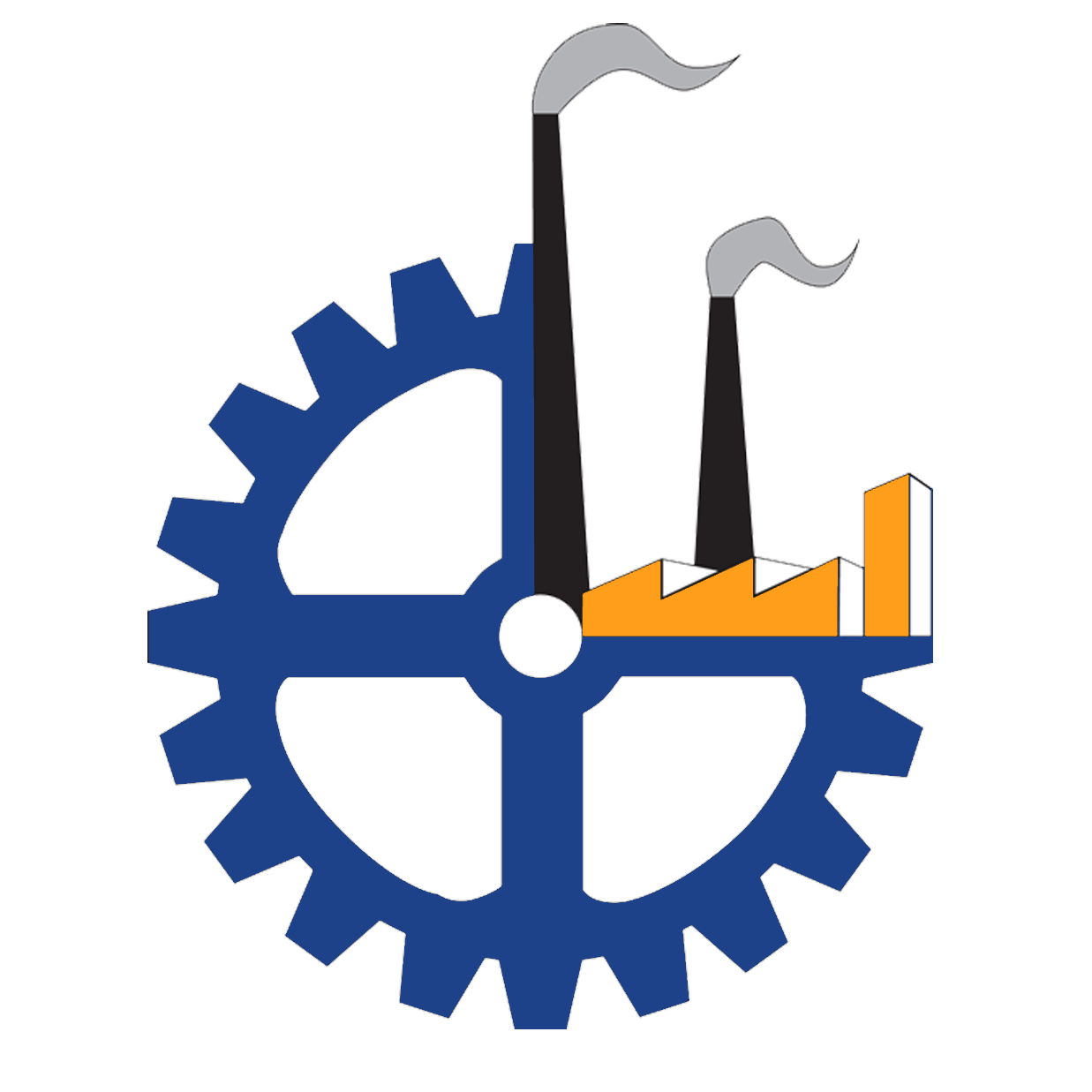
- Other names: ITCH
- Motto: La Técnica por el engrandecimiento de México
- Motto in English: Technology for the aggrandizement of Mexico
- Type: Public
- Established: 1948
- Academic affiliations: ANUIES, CACEI
- Director: Mtro. Alfredo Villalba Rodríguez
- Location: Avenida Tecnológico 2909, Colonia 10 de Mayo, Chihuahua, Chihuahua, 31310, Mexico; 28.660406°N 106.082830°W
- Campus: Urban
- Language: Spanish
- Athletics: 14 varsity teams
- Colors: Blue and Orange
- Nickname: Panteras
- Mascot: Panther
- First Institute of Technology in Mexico

The Chihuahua Institute of Technology (in Spanish: Instituto Tecnológico de Chihuahua, ITCH) is a public university located in the city of Chihuahua, capital of the state of Chihuahua, in Mexico.

== History ==
The ITCH was the first institute of technology in Mexico outside Mexico City. The first stone was laid on September 26, 1948, by the Public Education Secretary Manuel Guel Vidal and the Governor of Chihuahua Fernando Foglio Miramontes. Construction started some days later, on November 13, and was directed by Alfredo Guevara Cepeda and by the auxiliary resident engineer, Jesús Roberto Durán.

The first principal of the school was Gustavo Alvarado Pier, who became the school principal on October 9, 1948.

In 1953 ITCH graduated the first generation of technicians in the country of Mexico.

In 1954 ITCH graduated the first generation of industrial engineers, which also was the first generation of the country.

== Logo ==
The logo consists in a gear, showing three-fourths of the gear which contain 14 complete teeth and the remaining fourth with a drawing of a factory working at full speed, and was designed in an age when the industrialization of Mexico was the top priority.

== Motto ==
The motto of the institute, "La Técnica por el engrandecimiento de México" (Technology for the Growth of Mexico), implies a commitment to improve the country by educating its citizens with state-of-the-art technical knowledge.

== Mascot ==
The mascot of the institute is a panther, this symbol is mainly used when competing in sports.

== Academics ==
Offers a variety of degree programs:

- Electronic Engineering
- Mechanical Engineering
- Mecatronic Engineering
- Industrial Engineering
- Chemical Engineering
- Electrical Engineering
- Electromechanical Engineering
- Automotive Systems Engineering
- Materials Engineering
- Business Administration
- MS in Electronics
- Master of Business Administration

== See also ==
- List of universities in Mexico
