= Zacapoaxtla =

City in Puebla, Mexico

Coordinates: 19°53′N 97°35′W

Zacapoaxtla is a city and seat of the Zacapoaxtla Municipality, in the Mexican state of Puebla. The city has a population of 8,062 inhabitants, while the municipality has 49,242 inhabitants at the 2000 census.

== Name ==
The name means place where straw is counted, and it originates from Nahuatl roots: zacatl – straw; pohuatl – to count; and tlān – place. The name comes from the tribute people had to pay, i.e. as bales of straw.

== Education ==
The BUAP has a Regional Section there, which offers degrees in law, business administration and psychology.

== Geography ==
The city of Zacapoaxtla is located on a mountainous terrain on the northern part of the state, on the morphological region known as Sierra Norte or Sierra de Puebla, amidst the Sierra Madre Oriental. The city is surrounded by three mountains: "Tres cabezas" (Three Heads), "Gran poder de Dios" (Great Power of God) and the "Apaxtepec", an extinct volcano.

The municipality of Zacapoaxtla is located in the sub-basin of the Apulco River within the Tecolutla River basin.

=== Climate ===
Climate data for Zacapoaxtla (1951–2010)
Month	Jan	Feb	Mar	Apr	May	Jun	Jul	Aug	Sep	Oct	Nov	Dec	Year
Record high °C (°F)	34.0 (93.2)	32.0 (89.6)	34.0 (93.2)	35.0 (95.0)	35.5 (95.9)	42.0 (107.6)	38.0 (100.4)	30.0 (86.0)	29.0 (84.2)	30.5 (86.9)	31.0 (87.8)	32.0 (89.6)	42.0 (107.6)
Mean daily maximum °C (°F)	18.3 (64.9)	19.0 (66.2)	21.8 (71.2)	23.8 (74.8)	24.5 (76.1)	23.1 (73.6)	21.9 (71.4)	22.0 (71.6)	21.4 (70.5)	20.3 (68.5)	19.5 (67.1)	18.8 (65.8)	21.2 (70.2)
Daily mean °C (°F)	12.2 (54.0)	13.0 (55.4)	15.5 (59.9)	17.6 (63.7)	18.5 (65.3)	17.8 (64.0)	16.8 (62.2)	16.8 (62.2)	16.7 (62.1)	15.3 (59.5)	13.8 (56.8)	13.0 (55.4)	15.6 (60.1)
Mean daily minimum °C (°F)	6.3 (43.3)	7.0 (44.6)	9.1 (48.4)	11.3 (52.3)	12.5 (54.5)	12.6 (54.7)	11.7 (53.1)	11.6 (52.9)	12.0 (53.6)	10.3 (50.5)	8.2 (46.8)	7.3 (45.1)	10.0 (50.0)
Record low °C (°F)	−5.0 (23.0)	−2.5 (27.5)	0.0 (32.0)	3.0 (37.4)	4.5 (40.1)	0.5 (32.9)	5.0 (41.0)	4.0 (39.2)	3.0 (37.4)	0.0 (32.0)	−4.0 (24.8)	−11.0 (12.2)	−11.0 (12.2)
Average precipitation mm (inches)	38.7 (1.52)	43.0 (1.69)	34.6 (1.36)	49.7 (1.96)	68.1 (2.68)	161.4 (6.35)	123.1 (4.85)	129.9 (5.11)	361.9 (14.25)	244.1 (9.61)	100.9 (3.97)	47.7 (1.88)	1,403.1 (55.24)
Average precipitation days (≥ 0.1 mm)	8.5	7.6	7.1	7.7	7.5	13.6	15.4	15.2	17.7	14.0	10.4	8.0	132.7
Source: Servicio Meteorologico Nacional

== History ==
Though there are only a few archeological references, it is known that Nahua-Chichimecas people with Totonac background lived in this region. At the beginning of our era, almost the whole northeastern part of the now state of Puebla belonged to Totonacapan, and by the twelfth century this region was part of Chichimecatlalli, to which the Manor of Tlatlauhquitepec belonged, including Zacapoaxtla. Other versions indicate that around the year 1270, the Apaxtepec volcano erupted burying the town of Xaltetelli, thus giving origin to the town of Zacapoaloyan, nowadays Zacapoaxtla. In any case, the people who lived around were subdued under the rule of the Triple Alliance "Huey-Tlatocayotl", and brought under the rule of the Manor of Texcoco.

In 1524, after the Spanish conquest, Tlatlauhquitepec (along with Zacapoaxtla) was entrusted to Jacinto Portillo, Spanish conqueror who would later become a missionary of the Order of Friars Minor of St. Francis, known as Fra Cintos. Zacapoaxtla had its first, rustic, church in 1576 under the advocacy of Saint Peter that was later substituted by another during the first half of the 17th century.

The village obtained the category of town on 11 March 1826, after the end of the Mexican War of Independence. On 1 April 1835, the town became seat of the municipality.

In 1864, General Fernando María Ortega, governor of the state of Puebla, declared the Town of Zacapoaxtla "La ciudad del 25 de abril" ("The City of 25 April") as a memorial to these events.

The vast majority of the population of the municipality of Zacapoaxtla is Nahua, with over half the population knowing how to speak Nahuatl.
