= Villahermosa Institute of Technology =

University in Mexico

- Instituto Tecnológico de Villahermosa
- Type: Public university
- Established: 12 September 1974
- Affiliations: ANUIES
- Director: Ángel Francisco Velasco.
- Location: Villahermosa, Tabasco, Mexico; 18.0230°N 92.9032°W
- Campus: Urban
- Website: http://www.itvillahermosa.edu.mx

The Villahermosa Institute of Technology (in Spanish: Instituto Tecnológico de Villahermosa, ITVH) is a Mexican public university located in Villahermosa, Tabasco, in the Gulf of Mexico.

== History ==
The Institute was founded on September 12, 1974. On November 20, 1979 it moved to its current location at the Villahermosa Industrial Park.

== Academics ==
The Institute offers:

- Bachelor's degrees in Information Technology, Management, Computer Systems Engineering, Chemical Engineering, Biochemical Engineering, Industrial Engineering and Civil Engineering.
- Master's degrees in Management, Biochemical engineering and Regional development and business planning.
- Postgraduate diplomas in Information Technology and Food Quality.
