= Universidad Vasco de Quiroga =

- Motto: Educar en la Verdad
- Motto in English: Educate in Truth
- Type: Private Catholic
- Established: January 1979
- Rector: Raúl Martínez Rubio
- Location: Morelia, Michoacán, Mexico
- Colours: Blue and black
- Mascot: Halcones
- Website: uvaq.edu.mx

The Universidad Vasco de Quiroga (UVAQ) is a Catholic institution of higher education located in Morelia, Michoacán, Mexico.

== History ==
The Instituto de Estudios Superiores Vasco de Quiroga (IESVAQ) was founded in January 1979, making it the first such private institution in Michoacán. It is named for Vasco de Quiroga, the first bishop of Michoacán, and has regular commemorative activities in honor of its namesake.

== Campuses ==
The primary campus of the UVAQ is located in Morelia. It also has branch campuses in six additional Mexican cities—Ciudad Hidalgo, Lázaro Cárdenas and Zamora in Michoacán, Irapuato, Guanajuato, Querétaro, and San Luis Potosí—and a branch campus in Chicago in the United States, known as Quiroga College. The Prepa UVAQ system of preparatory schools has facilities in Ciudad Hidalgo, Lázaro Cárdenas, Morelia, Pátzcuaro, Quiroga, Tacámbaro and Zacapu.

The Morelia campus has its own radio station, XHELI-FM 98.1 "UVE Radio", which came to air in 2015.
