= Mexicali Institute of Technology =

- Instituto Tecnológico de Mexicali
- Motto: La Tecnología para el bien de la humanidad "Technology for the wellbeing of mankind"
- Type: Public
- Established: 1981
- President: Manuel de Jesús López Pérez.
- Location: Mexicali, Baja California, Mexico
- Website: www.itmexicali.edu.mx

The Mexicali Institute of Technology (Spanish: Instituto Tecnológico de Mexicali, ITM) is a college level technological institution located in the city of Mexicali, Baja California, Mexico. It started operations since 19 October 1981. The college is one of three technological institutes part of the national system of regional technological institutes in Baja California.

== History ==
The Mexicali Institute of Technology began its activities on 19 October 1981. The demand of new options of higher education level to give support and service to the productive sector and the community and efforts of the board of teachers along with federal, state and municipal authorities led to the birth of this Institute. Due to these reasons, the Mexicali Institute of Technology began offering High Education Level courses, developing Institutional Integrity with the industry private sector. Since a decade ago the Mexicali Institute of Technology also offers master's and doctoral degrees.

== Courses (Fields of Study) ==
Bachelor's degree (Licenciaturas) 1991 – Industrial Engineering (Ingeniería Industrial), Mechanical Engineering (Ingeniería Mecánica), Electrical Engineering (Ingeniería Eléctrica), Electronics Engineering (Ingeniería Electrónica) and Computer Science (Informática)

== See also ==
- Ensenada Institute of Technology
- Tijuana Institute of Technology
