= Instituto Tecnológico de Ciudad Madero =

Technological institute in Ciduad Madero, Tamaulipas, Mexico

Coordinates: 22°15′12″N 97°50′45″W

- Parent company: Instituto Tecnológico de Ciudad Madero
- Founded: 1950
- Country of origin: Mexico
- Headquarters location: Ciudad Madero
- Key people: Nigel Portwood
- Publication types: Books, Journals, Sheet music
- Imprints: Clarendon Press
- Official website: www.cdmadero.tecnm.mx

Instituto Tecnológico de Ciudad Madero is a technological institute in Ciudad Madero, Tamaulipas, Mexico. Commonly abbreviated as ITCM. ITCM is part of the Mexican public education system (SEP) and offers several careers mainly related to the industrial needs of the region.

== History ==
The first stone of the institution was placed on November 20, 1950. Its educational activities started in 1954 offering technical courses. Its first director was Mr. Luis Hidalgo y Castro.

In 1956 he started undergraduate programs in Chemical Engineering, Electrical and Mechanical.

Its current director (since January 2011) is Mr. Arnulfo Hernandez Hector Enriquez.

== Technological Institute of Ciudad Madero ==
The Constitution of a Board pro-construction of the School of Arts and Crafts was the first step that gave rise to what in the beginning was the Regional Technological Institute of Ciudad Madero.

On November 20, 1950, the then director of PEMEX, Mr. Antonio J. Bermudez, representing the president of the Republic, Mr. Miguel German Valdes, laid the cornerstone of the institute. Shortly after the September 2, 1954 courses began at 7:00 am with a total of 511 students serving Chief Engineer Luis Hidalgo y Castro.

The educational programs offered to initiate functions were:

Technical Preparation

- Qualified Workers in Machinery and Tools
- Electrical Repairers
- Welders Oxyacetylene and Arc
- Carpenters, Joiners

RAMA subprofessional

- Mechanical Technician
- Electrician
- Technical Oil Well Driller

Vocational School

- Mechanical
- Electrical
- Chemistry
- Civil
- Architecture

In September 1956 undergraduate careers started with the specialties of Chemical Engineering, Mechanical Engineering and Electrical Engineering. In 1957 it joined the Technical High School. A year later in 1958, offering the specialty of Internal Combustion Technician and by 1961 began in Industrial Engineering.

The Electronics Technician specialty started in 1968, while the worker started in 1972. In 1974 joined their curricula Open Education System at two levels. The educational offer was extended in 1975 with new subjects, Engineering, Geological Engineering and Geophysics.

Accelerated regional development motivated by the year 1976, the Graduate Programs begin with the Master in Management Systems and a Masters in Petroleum and Petrochemical Technology.

1986 was important in the growth of the institution for bachelor level degrees in Electronic Engineering and Computer Systems Engineering Graduate level and start the Master of Science in Electrical Engineering, a Masters in Mathematics Education (through an agreement with CINVESTAV) also is offered for the first time beginning with Petrochemical Ph.D., whose program was born from the continued growth of this industry in the area. Also in these specialties are signed cooperation agreements with the Mexican Petroleum Institute (IMP) and the International Cooperation Agency of Japan (JICA).

In 1993 he began the career of Engineering Geoscience, settling of Engineering Geology and Geophysics. That same year, 1993, offer the Master of Science in Engineering Management. In 1995 the Bachelor in Computer Science started. In 1996 the Master of Science in Chemical Engineering began as a response to changing national trends with respect to oil development. This change also resulted from the recommendations of the Evaluation Committee of the National Register of Graduate CONACYT. That same year, the PhD in Chemical Engineering Petrochemical replacing.

In August 2000 began the Master of Science in Computer Science and six years later was registered in the National Register of CONACYT Graduate with a Master of Science in Chemical Engineering which places them among the best graduate programs in these disciplines.

In 2001 starts the Masters in Administrative Management (replacing the Master of Science in Engineering Management). By 2006 the program starts the race of Environmental Engineering and in 2008 another Graduate with a Masters in Electrical Engineering to replace the Master of Science in Electrical Engineering. And as a result of an investigation of educational provision in our suburbs, authorized the deployment of the most recent race at the institution in August 2010 that starts the Engineering Program in Business Management

All this historical record has forged a solid institution, prestige, based on the needs of organizations and the result is that the Technological Institute of Ciudad Madero and is considered one of the leading research centers in the country.

== Academic programs ==
It offers degrees in:

- Environmental Engineering
- Industrial Engineering
- Electrical Engineering
- Electronic Engineering
- Engineering Geoscience
- Engineering Business Management
- Mechanical Engineering
- Chemical Engineering
- Computer Systems Engineering
- Degree in Computer

At the undergraduate level it serves an average of 8000 students.

At graduate level offers three master's programs and two PhD programs:

- M.C. in Computer Science
- M. Administrative Management
- M.C. in Electrical Engineering
- M.C. in Chemical Engineering
- Doctorate of Science in Chemical Engineering
- Ph.D. in Computer Science.

The latter two programs are enrolled in the National Graduate Padron CONACYT SEP. It also offers a Master of Administrative Management profession-type and a Doctorate of Science in Chemical Engineering. The average population is 293 graduate students.
