= Universidad Popular Autónoma del Estado de Puebla =

Catholic university in Puebla, Mexico

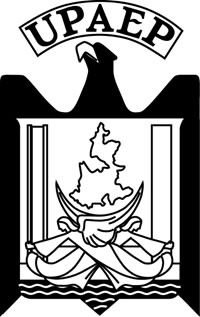
- Motto: La cultura al servicio del pueblo
- Motto in English: Culture at the service of the people
- Type: Private
- Established: 1973
- Rector: Emilio J. Baños Ardavín
- Location: Puebla City, Mexico; 19.0485°N 98.2163°W
- Campus: Urban
- Colors: Red & white
- Nickname: Águilas (Eagles)
- Website: www.upaep.mx
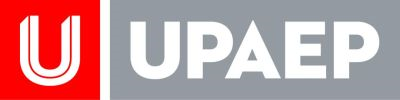

The Universidad Popular Autónoma del Estado de Puebla (English: Autonomous Popular University of the State of Puebla, UPAEP) is a private non-profit university located in Puebla City, Puebla, Mexico.

Founded on 7 May 1973, it is currently a highly reputed university with an important national and international presence which has over 43 undergraduate programs, 34 masters programs, 12 Ph.D. programs, and 11 specializations.

== History ==
The university was founded on 7 May 1973 by catholic students protesting against the perceived left-wing drift of the BUAP; they were supported by the Archbishop through the means of the Frente Universitario Anticomunista (Anti-Communist University Front, FUA), student group linked to El Yunque.

== Campus ==
The university is formed by an urban campus composed of several buildings spread throughout the Barrio de Santiago in the city of Puebla, as well as other premises located in the metropolitan area and the Atlixco municipality. There are 103 labs and classrooms on the main campus, with 11 of them completely purposed for research. As part of the UPAEP system, there is another campus in the city of Tehuacán and nine high schools throughout the whole state of Puebla (Cholula, Santiago, Angelópolis, Sur, Atlixco, Tehuacán and San Martín) and Tlaxcala (Santa Anna and Huamantla).

== Certifications ==
UPAEP university is acknowledged by the Massachusetts Institute of Technology as a member of the EdNet educational network of the Lean Advancement Initiative consortium; furthermore, it's part of the Competitiveness and Strategy Institute of Harvard University's Business School. UPAEP was one of the founding universities of the Mexican Federation of Private High Studies Institutions and is a member of the ANUIES.

== Academic offering ==
The UPAEP covers all of the education levels in México, as the system includes elementary School, junior High school and high School.

=== High school system ===
UPAEP has nine high schools, scattered around the states of Puebla and Tlaxcala. Four of them are located within the Metropolitan Zone of Puebla, of which two, the Santiago (the oldest) and Angelópolis (the newest) were recognized in December 2010 by the International Baccalaureate to impart the Diploma Programme to its students.

=== Undergraduate ===
The UPAEP currently offers 43 different bachelor programs in the economics and administrative sciences, design, health sciences, humanities, engineering and information technologies areas.

The university has a reputation for achieving external accreditation of its programs. Approximately nine of ten students enrolled in the UPAEP study in an accredited program, being the second-highest ratio for a private university in Mexico.

Some studies can be done either in the Online or in the Open University system.

=== Postgraduate ===
UPAEP academic offer also includes continual education, specialties, masters and doctoral degrees.

== Research ==
The university has established the following research centers:

- High Technology Services Center
- Native Plants Research Center
- Technologic Innovation in Protected Agriculture Center
- Economic Intelligence Research Center
- Science and Religion Studies Center

== Sports ==
The UPAEP has also been successful in College Sports competitions in Mexico. The representative teams are named the Águilas UPAEP, and they are currently ranked 5° by the CONADEIP, an organization formed by the most important Private Institutions of Higher learning in Mexico. One of its most important team is the Basketball team, which have been national champions several times. The team has a historic rivalry with the Aztecas de la UDLAP basketball team. They play in the "El Nido" Gymnasium.

UPAEP has representative teams in 7 Sports:

- Basketball
- Soccer
- Indoor soccer
- Tennis
- Swimming
- Track & field
- Tae Kwon Do

== Bibliography ==
- Uribe, Mónica (2008). "La ultraderecha en México: el conservadurismo moderno" (PDF). El Cotidiano. 23 (149). Ciudad de México: Universidad Autónoma Metropolitana: 39–57. ISSN 0186-1840.
