= De la Mora (surname) =

De la Mora is a surname. "De la," in several Romance languages (including Spanish and Romanian), means "from." "Mora," in Spanish, translates to "mulberry."

== Etymology ==
"Mora" might represent a topographic surname for a family who lives or lived where mulberries grow or grew.

"Mora," might be part of an ethnic phrase that means "the Moorish woman's son," from mora "(female) Moor."

Similar surnames: Del Moral, Lamora, Delamar, De Moura, De La Torre, Della Porta.

== People with the surname ==
=== Fine arts and performing arts ===
- Alexandra de la Mora (born 1980), Mexican actress
- Antonio de la Mora (1884–1926), Mexican musician who served as bandmaster in the military bands of 3 countries
- Brittni de La Mora (born 1987), American pornographic actress
- Enrique de la Mora (1907–1978), Mexican architect
- Fernando de la Mora (tenor) (born 1958), Mexican operatic tenor
- Guillermo Schmidhuber de la Mora (born 1943), Mexican author, playwright, and critic

=== Politics, military, and other public services ===
- Fernando de la Mora (politician) (1773–1835), Paraguayan statesman
- Francisco de la Mora y Ceballos Spanish military officer, merchant, and Governor of colonial New Mexico between March 1632 and 1635
- Gonzalo Fernández de la Mora (1924–2002), Spanish essayist and politician
- Itzel Ríos de la Mora (born 1978), Mexican politician
- Ximena Puente de la Mora (born 1977), Mexican lawyer, academic, researcher, and politician

=== Religion ===
- Georgina de la Mora, American megachurch pastor, wife of Sergio
- Sergio José de la Mora (born 1966), American megachurch pastor, husband of Georgina

=== Sports ===
- David de la Mora (born 1989), Mexican boxer
- Marco Fabián de la Mora (born 1989), Mexican soccer player

== Fictional characters with the surname ==
- The central family of Mexican television show The House of Flowers, including Paulina de la Mora

== See also ==
- De Mora
- Mora (disambiguation)
