= Delamar =

Delamar may refer to:

- DeLamar (surname)

In Nevada:

- Delamar, Nevada
- Delamar Dry Lake
- Delamar Mountains
- Delamar Wash
- Delamar Flat
- Delamar Valley
- Delamar Landing Field

In Idaho:

- De Lamar, Idaho
- DeLamar Mine

In other uses:

- DeLaMar, a theatre in Amsterdam
