= University of the Valley =

The term University of the Valley could refer to the following:

- University of Valle, one of the biggest and most important universities in Colombia.
- University of the Valley (Costa Rica)
- University of the Valley of Atemajac
- University of the Valley of Guatemala, the first private university in Guatemala.
- University of the Valley of Itajaí
- University of the Valley of Mexico, a for-profit university in Mexico.
