= Sandra Pascoe Ortiz =

Mexican chemical engineer

- Born: Mexico
- Education: University of Guadalajara
- Scientific career
- Workplaces: Universidad del Valle de Atemajac

Sandra Pascoe Ortiz is a Mexican researcher and chemical engineer. She is a faculty member at the Universidad del Valle de Atemajac in Zapopan. Ortiz is known for developing a non-toxic, renewable, and biodegradable plastic alternative made from cactus juice.

== Education and career ==
Ortiz finished Engineering from the University of Guadalajara in August 1995. She obtained a degree in biotechnology from the same university in August 1999.

She began teaching at the Universidad del Valle de Atemajac in January 2002. In January 2011, she was promoted as a research professor and has been working on sustainable development and innovation projects since.

== Eco-friendly plastic alternative ==
In 2013, Ortiz began researching on using ph

nopal cactus as a base for plastic with a few students.[4] There was a lack of support from the international community—thereby an insufficiency with equipment, materials and interest from fellow scientists[5]—so the study was eventually abandoned.[4] She later continued the project with a new set of students.[6]

Ortiz found out that the cactus is composed of the same sugars and gums that make up the creation of biopolymer substances, which are the building blocks of plastic itself. They initially used the most common cactus variety in Mexican cuisine: opuntia ficus indica, and then switched to opuntia megacantha. The juice of the cactus is extracted and mixed with glycerine, proteins, natural waxes and colorants; then it is laminated and left to dry. The finished product is very malleable, leaving Ortiz to extend the research to the manufacture of a wider range of products.

Unlike the manufacture of plastic, the process does not require crude oil, as its mining has caused much flak from environmentalists. It is also carbon neutral, as the carbon it emitted upon degradation is equal to what it took in upon its growth.

The bioplastic made from prickly pear cactus is renewable—as few leaves are taken from the plant thereby allowing it to regenerate, rather than regrow from seed to adulthood like most upon utilization. It is also non-toxic and safe to ingest both for animals and humans alike. The bioplastic degrades after 2–3 months and 7 days if immersed in water.

The process is done exclusively in Ortiz's lab. She is experimenting with 300 species of nopal plant native in Mexico and is exploring the use of cactus in toys, bags, and other plastic products for wide-scale commercial use.
