= Statue of Enrique Díaz de León =

Statue of Enrique Díaz de León may refer to:

- Statue of Enrique Díaz de León (Rotonda de los Jaliscienses Ilustres), Guadalajara, Jalisco, Mexico
- Statue of Enrique Díaz de León (University of Guadalajara), Guadalajara, Jalisco, Mexico
