= Laura Solórzano =

Mexican poet (born 1961)

- Born: 1961 (age 64–65); Guadalajara
- Education: University of Guadalajara, National Autonomous University of Mexico
- Writing career
- Genre: Poetry
- Notable work: Lip Wolf

Laura Solórzano (born 1961 Guadalajara) is a Mexican poet.

== Life ==
She studied Psychology at the University of Guadalajara, and Visual Arts at the National Autonomous University of Mexico. She teaches at the Centro de Arte Audiovisual, Guadalajara.

== Works ==
=== Poetry ===
- Evolución (University of Guadalajara, 1976),
- Ficus Seed (Ediciones Rimbaud, Tlaxcala, 1999),
- Lobo de labio (El Cálamo, Guadalajara, Jalisco, 2003), ISBN 9789709022667
  - Lip Wolf, Jen Hofer translation (Action Books, Notre Dame, 2007), ISBN 9780976569275 OCLC 172679121
- Boca perdida (Editorial bonobos, Toluca, 2005 ),
- A rose bush for Mr. K (University of Guanajuato, 2006),

=== Collections ===
- The mirror in the cage (Secretariat of Culture, Guadalajara, Jalisco, 2006),
- Nervio Náufrago (La Zonámbula, 2011),
- Excursion to the powder forest (Ruido Blanco, Ecuador, 2013) and Vegetal Prayer (Mano Santa, 2015).

=== Anthologies ===
- Without visible doors (editions without name, and University of Pittsburgh, 2003),
- Echo of voices (Arlequín, FONCA / SIGMA, 2004),
- Poesía viva de Jalisco (editorial CONACULTA / University of Guadalajara, 2004 )
- Pulir huesos (Editorial Galaxia de Gutemberg, Barcelona, 2008).
