= Universidad del Valle =

The term Universidad del Valle could refer to the following:

- Universidad del Valle (Colombia), one of the biggest and most important universities in Colombia.
- Universidad del Valle (Costa Rica)
- Universidad del Valle de Atemajac, a private catholic university in Mexico
- Universidad del Valle de Cuernavaca
- Universidad del Valle de Guatemala, the first private university in Guatemala.
- Universidad del Valle de México, a for-profit university in Mexico.
- Universidad del Valle de Nicaragua, a private university in Nicaragua.
- Universidad Privada del Valle, a private university in Bolivia.
