= CUCSH =

University Center of Social Sciences and Humanities
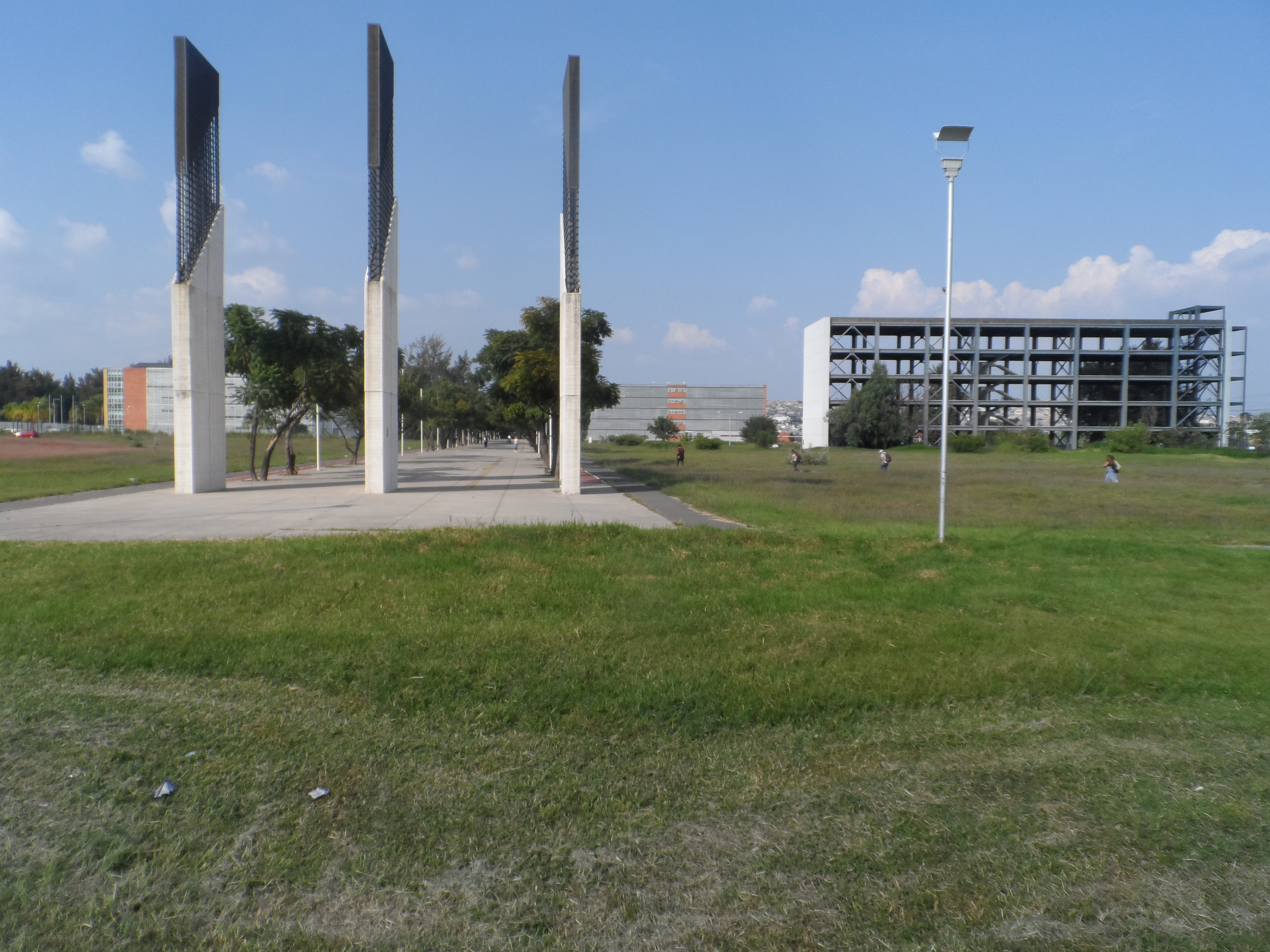
- Type: Public
- Rector: Dr. Dulce María Zúñiga Chávez
- Students: 11,042 (2017)
- Location: Los Belenes. Av. José Parres Arias #150, San José del Bajío, C.P. 45132, Zapopan, Jalisco, Mexico., Zapopan, Mexico
- Website: www.cucsh.udg.mx

The University Center of Social Sciences and Humanities (CUCSH) of the University of Guadalajara was formally established in 1994, as part of the structural reform initiated by the University in 1989, which led to the formation of the University Network.

== Academic offerings ==
The following programs are offered:

Bachelor’s degrees

- Law (Semi-school-based modality)
- Law
- Anthropology
- Public Communication
- Criminology
- Teaching of French as a Foreign Language
- Teaching of English (Open and Distance Semi-school-based Modality)
- Teaching of English as a Foreign Language
- Creative Writing
- Political Studies and Governance
- Philosophy
- Geography
- History
- Hispanic Literature
- International Relations
- Sociology
- Social Work
- Degree Completion in Social Work (NiLiTS)

Master’s degrees

- Bioethics
- Political Science
- Social Sciences
- Communication
- Law
- Local Development and Territory
- Teaching of English as a Foreign Language
- Critical Language Studies
- Gender Studies
- Studies of English Languages and Cultures
- Mexican Literature Studies
- Philosophical Studies
- Francophone Studies: Pedagogy, Linguistics, and Intercultural Studies
- Mesoamerican Studies
- Social Management and Development
- Global Politics and Transpacific Studies
- History of Mexico
- Educational Research
- Applied Linguistics
- Inter-American Literatures
- International Relations of Governments and Local Actors (CONACYT National Graduate Program)
- Interinstitutional Master’s Degree in Deutsch als Fremdsprache: Intercultural Studies of the German Language, Literature, and Culture

Doctoral degrees

- Political Science
- Social Sciences
- Cognition and Learning
- Law
- Education
- Geography and Territorial Planning
- History
- Humanities
