= Raúl Padilla López =

Mexican academic (1954–2023)

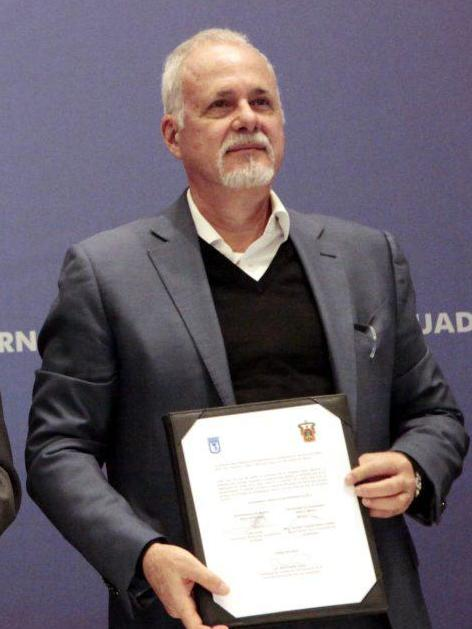
Padilla in 2017

Raúl Padilla López (3 May 1954 – 2 April 2023) was a Mexican professor and academic. He was the rector of the University of Guadalajara (UdeG) from 1989 to 1995. He was also president of the Guadalajara International Book Fair, the Guadalajara International Film Festival, and had control of cultural and diverse infrastructure of the UdeG, such as a soccer club (Leones Negros), travel agencies and hotels. Padilla López died at his home on 2 April 2023 of a self-inflicted gunshot wound. He had an older son and daughter. He married in 2016, and had twins. He was 68 years old.
