= Guadalajara International Book Fair =

Book fair in Guadalajara, Mexico

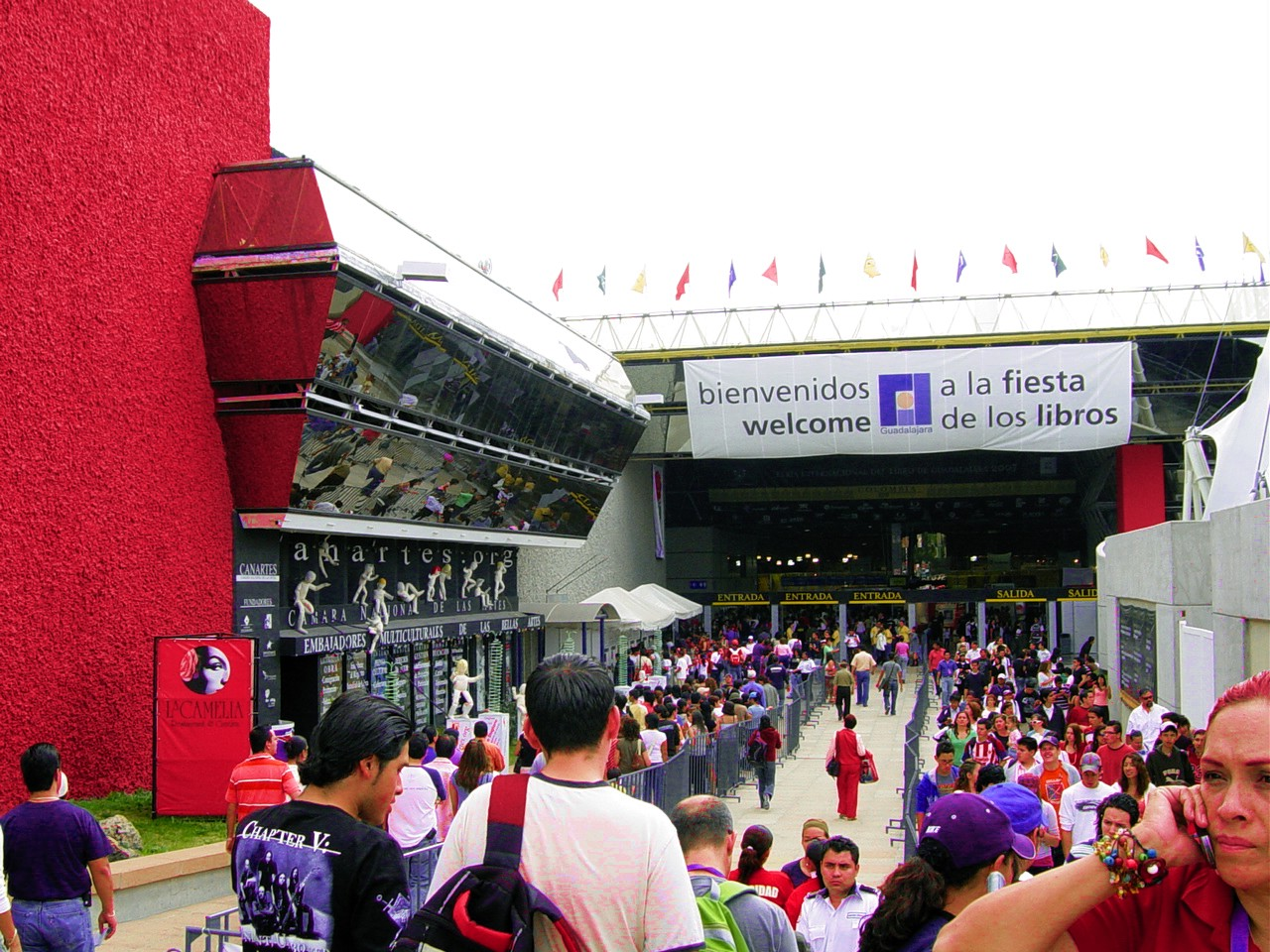
- XXI Book Fair 2007
- Status: Active
- Genre: Multi-genre
- Venue: Expo Guadalajara convention center
- Locations: Guadalajara, Jalisco
- Country: Mexico
- Inaugurated: 1987
- Attendance: 525,000 (2006)
- Organizer: University of Guadalajara
- Website: www.fil.com.mx/ingles

The Guadalajara International Book Fair, better known as the FIL (from its Spanish name, Feria Internacional del Libro de Guadalajara), is the largest book fair in the Americas, and second-largest in the world after Frankfurt's. It is considered the most important cultural annual event of its kind in the Spanish-speaking world. The purpose of the FIL is to provide an optimal business environment for the book-industry professionals and exhibitors who attend the fair, and for the reading public eager to meet authors and pick up the latest entries in the market.

Created in 1987, the FIL is put on by the University of Guadalajara and is held at the Expo Guadalajara convention center, which has 40,000 m^{2} (430,000 ft^{2}) of floor space. FIL is held every year, starting on the last Saturday in November and continuing for nine days, in Guadalajara, Jalisco, Mexico.

The current managing director of the Guadalajara International Book Fair is Marisol Schulz, and its president from its inception until his death in 2023 was Raúl Padilla López. The book fair won the Princess of Asturias Award for Communication and Humanities in 2020.

== Prizes and honours ==
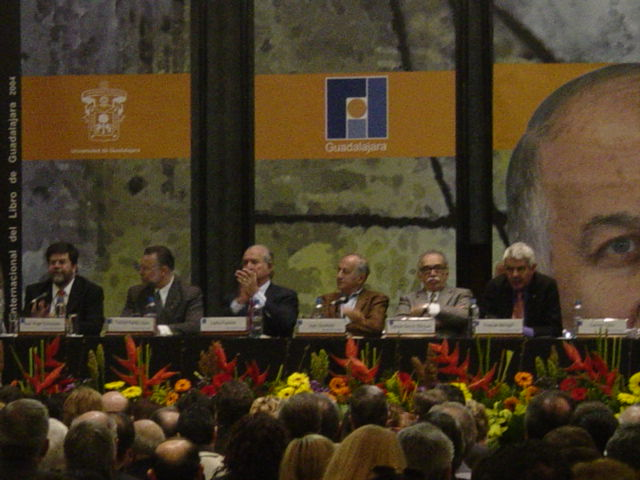
Carlos Fuentes, Gabriel García Márquez, and Pasqual Maragall awarding the Juan Rulfo Prize to Juan Goytisolo, FIL 2004

As a way of rewarding and honouring literary publishing, the FIL awards the following annual prizes and honours:

- Premio FIL de Literatura en Lenguas Romances (FIL Award for Literature in Romance Languages; previously known as the Premio de Literatura Latinoamericana y del Caribe Juan Rulfo) (1991)
- Premio y Homenaje Nacional de Periodismo Cultural Fernando Benítez (Fernando Benítez Prize and National Homage to Cultural Journalism) (1992)
- Reconocimiento al Mérito Editorial (Publishing Merit Award) (1993)
- Premio Sor Juana Inés de la Cruz (Sor Juana Inés de la Cruz Prize) (1993)
- ArpaFIL (1995)
- Homenaje al Bibliófilo (Homage to Bibliophiles) (2001)
- Homenaje al Bibliotecario (Homage to Librarians) (2002)

== Invited countries or cultural regions ==
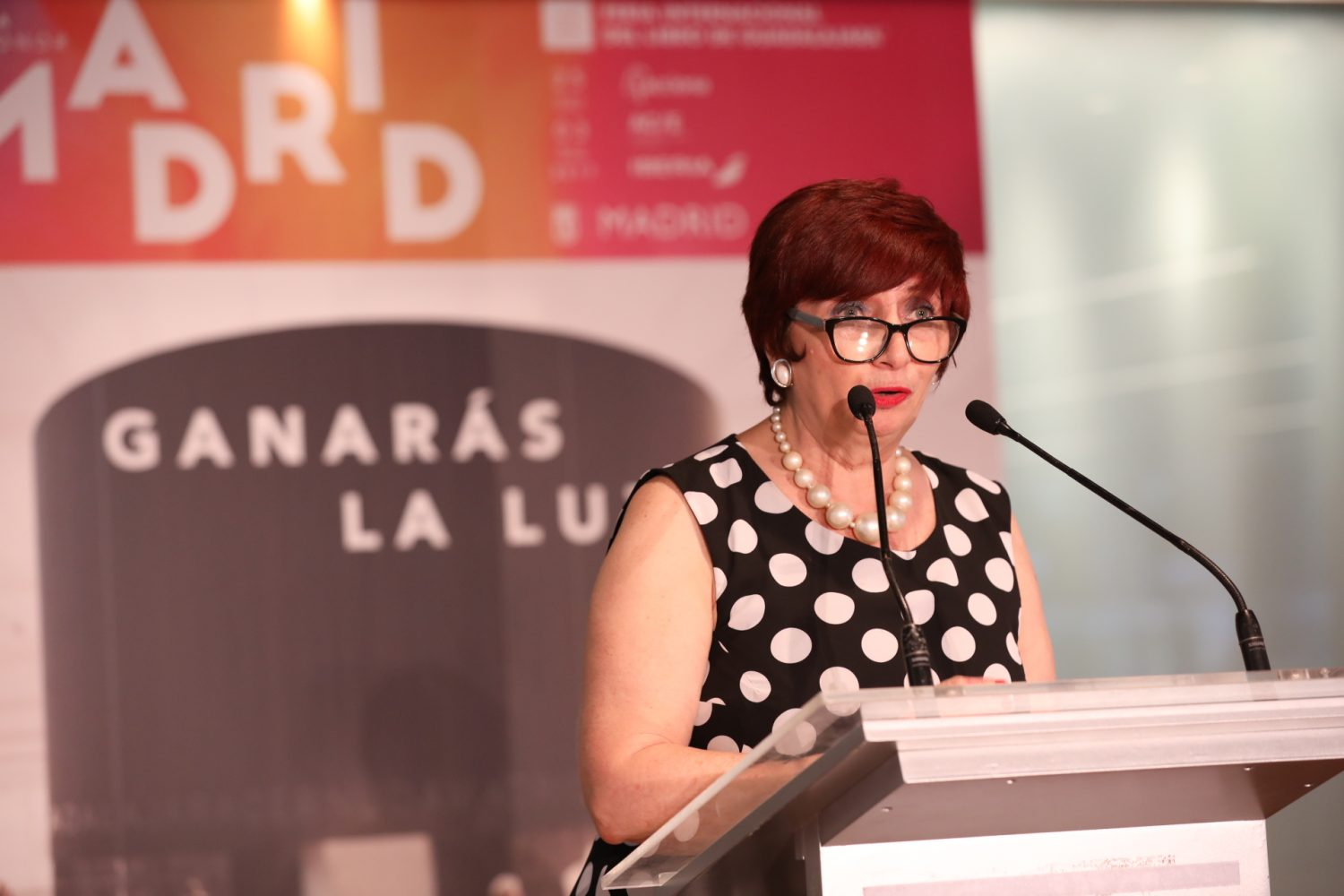
Marisol Schulz, managing director of the Guadalajara International Book Fair

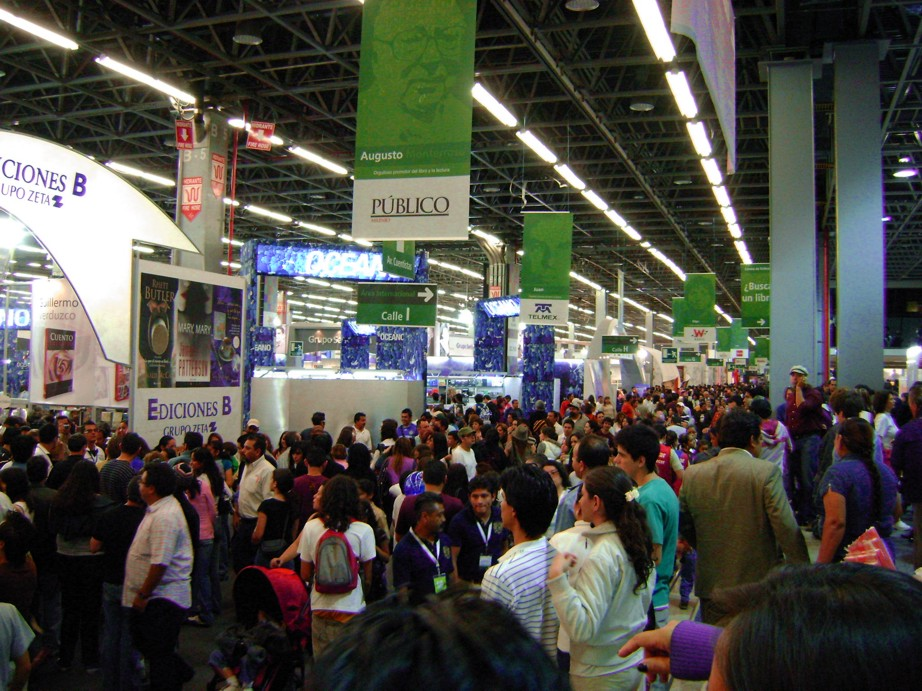
Interior FIL 2008

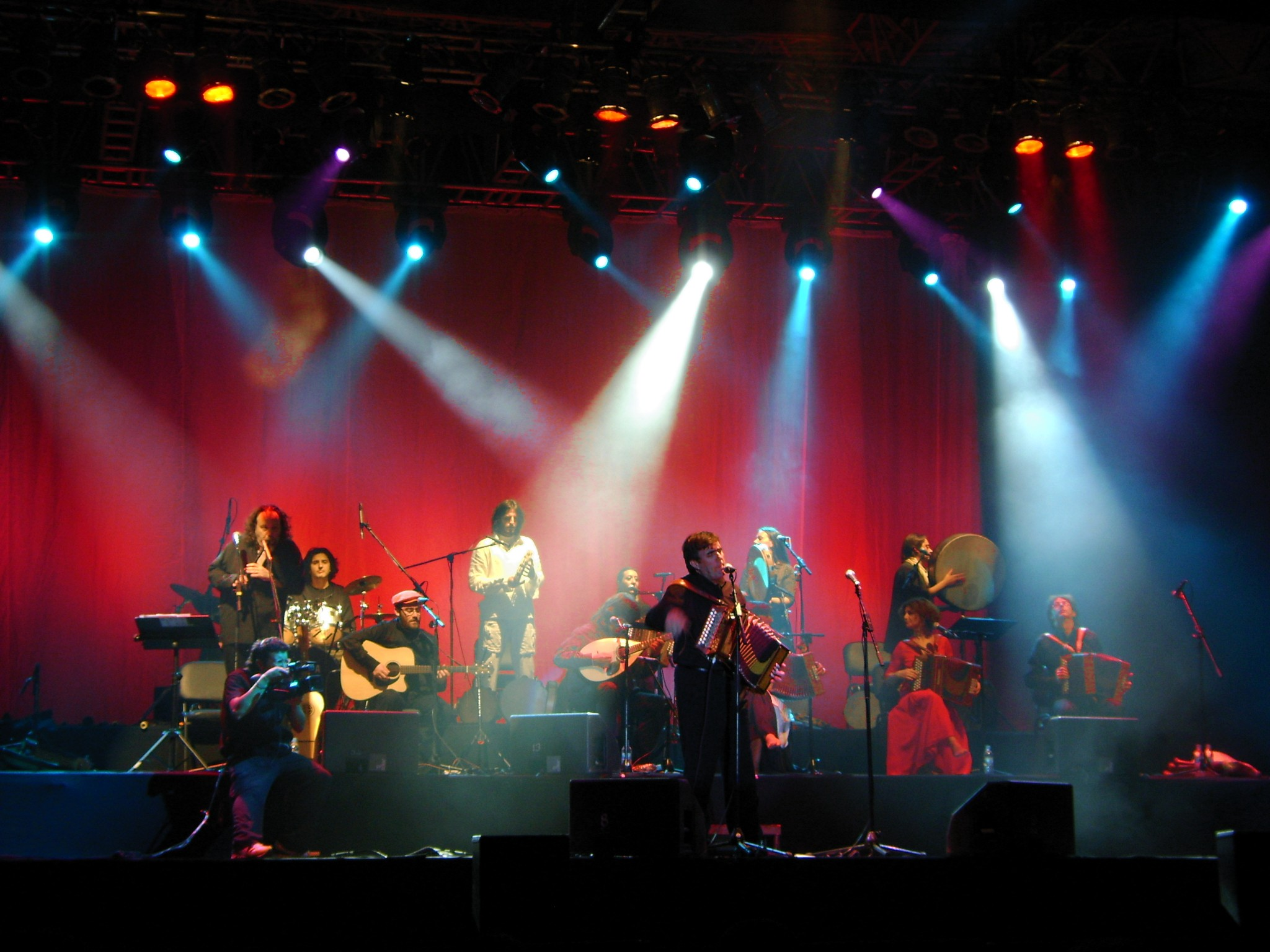
Popular Italian Orchestra in the esplanade of the FIL 2008

Since 1993, the FIL has invited a country or region to be the guest of honor, providing each an opportunity to display the best of its cultural and literary heritage, as listed in the following table:

Year	Guest of Honor Country or Region
1993	Colombia
1994	New Mexico
1995	Venezuela
1996	Canada
1997	Argentina
1998	Puerto Rico
1999	Chile
2000	Spain
2001	Brazil
2002	Cuba
2003	Quebec
2004	Catalonia
2005	Peru
2006	Andalusia
2007	Colombia
2008	Italy
2009	Los Angeles
2010	Castile and León
2011	Germany
2012	Chile
2013	Israel
2014	Argentina
2015	United Kingdom
2016	Latin America
2017	Madrid
2018	Portugal
2019	India
2021	Peru
2022	(Emirate of Sharjah) Sharjah and Arab culture
2023	European Union
2025	Barcelona

== History ==
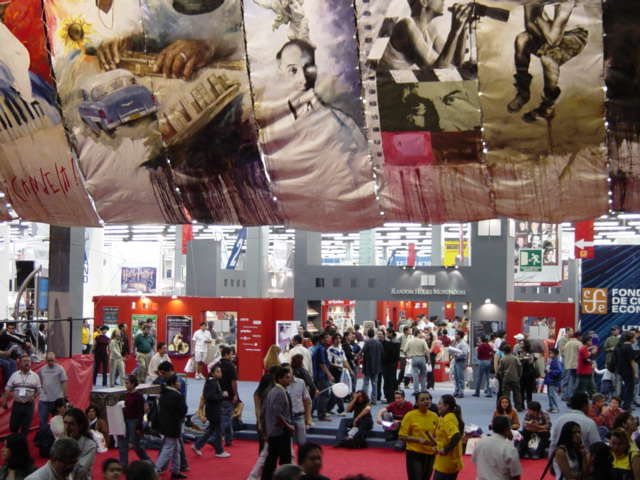
Main entrance during the 2002 Guadalajara International Book Fair

=== 2005 ===
- 15,357 exhibitors from 45 countries
- Visitor attendance at the fair was 494,388
- 2,899 cultural activities

=== 2006 ===
- 1,307,002 visits were made to the FIL website
- Visitor attendance was 525,000
- 84,495 children at activities for children
- 16,740 exhibitors
- 1,523 journalists and 439 communications media accredited from 60 countries
- 296 book presentations with their respective authors
- 110 literary agents
- 94 artistic and musical activities

=== 2013 ===
- 1,935 publishing houses from 43 countries
- Visitor attendance at the fair was 1,000,000

=== 2016 ===
- The acclaimed author George R. R. Martin was a key speaker here where the author provided hints about the next two books in the series A Song of Ice and Fire.

=== 2023 ===
- 2,469 publishing houses from 61 countries
- Visitor attendance was 857,315
