= Statue of Enrique Díaz de León (University of Guadalajara) =

Statue in Guadalajara, Jalisco, Mexico

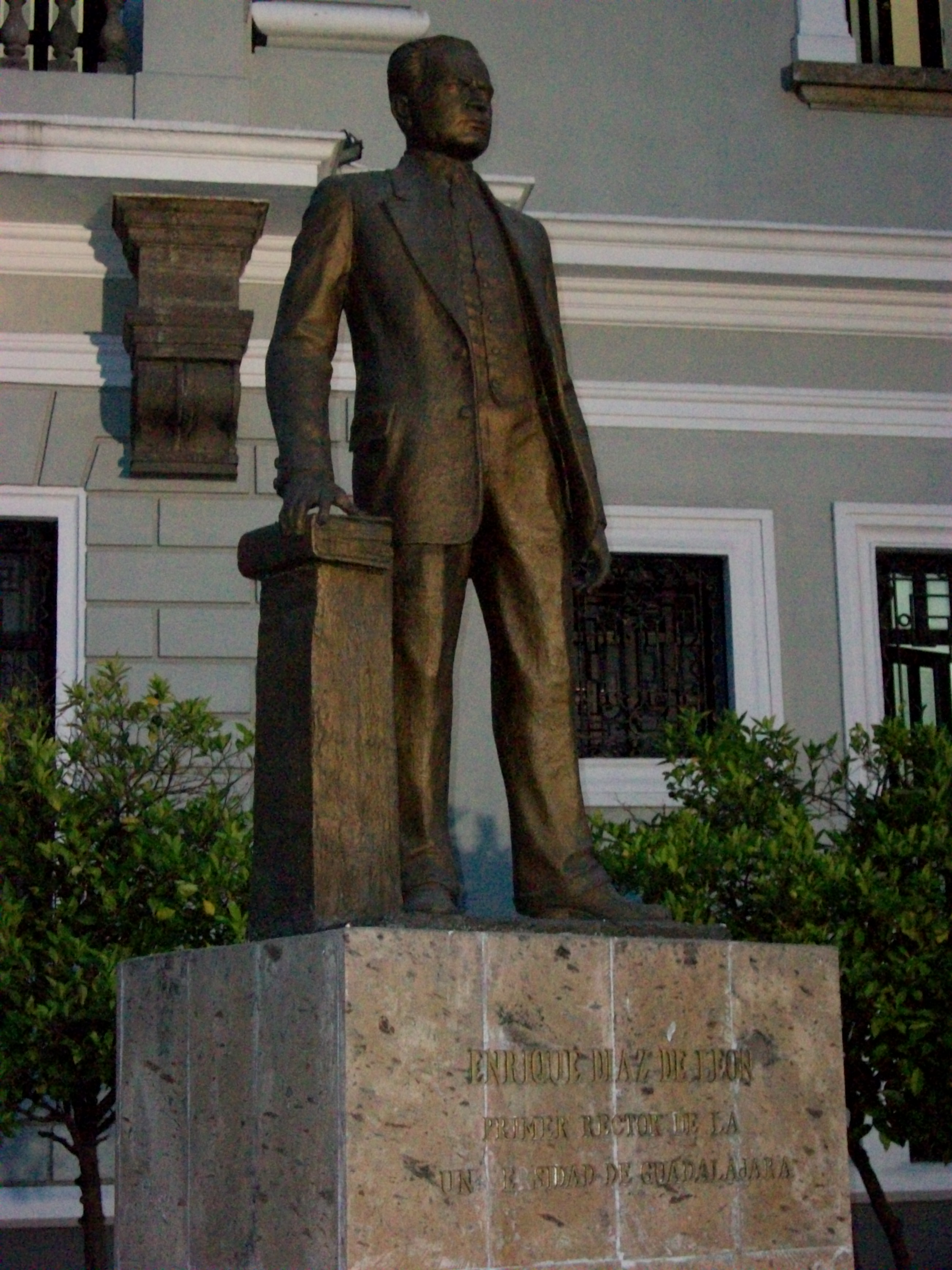
- The statue in 2010
- Subject: Enrique Díaz de León
- Location: Guadalajara, Jalisco, Mexico; 20°40′29.8″N 103°21′33.5″W

A statue of Enrique Díaz de León is installed in Guadalajara, in the Mexican state of Jalisco. It is located at the University of Guadalajara as Díaz de León served as the first dean after its re-foundation in 1925.

The statue was moved and placed in front of the General Rectory Building on 10 December 2015, where he looks at the avenue that bears his name.
