= CUCEA =

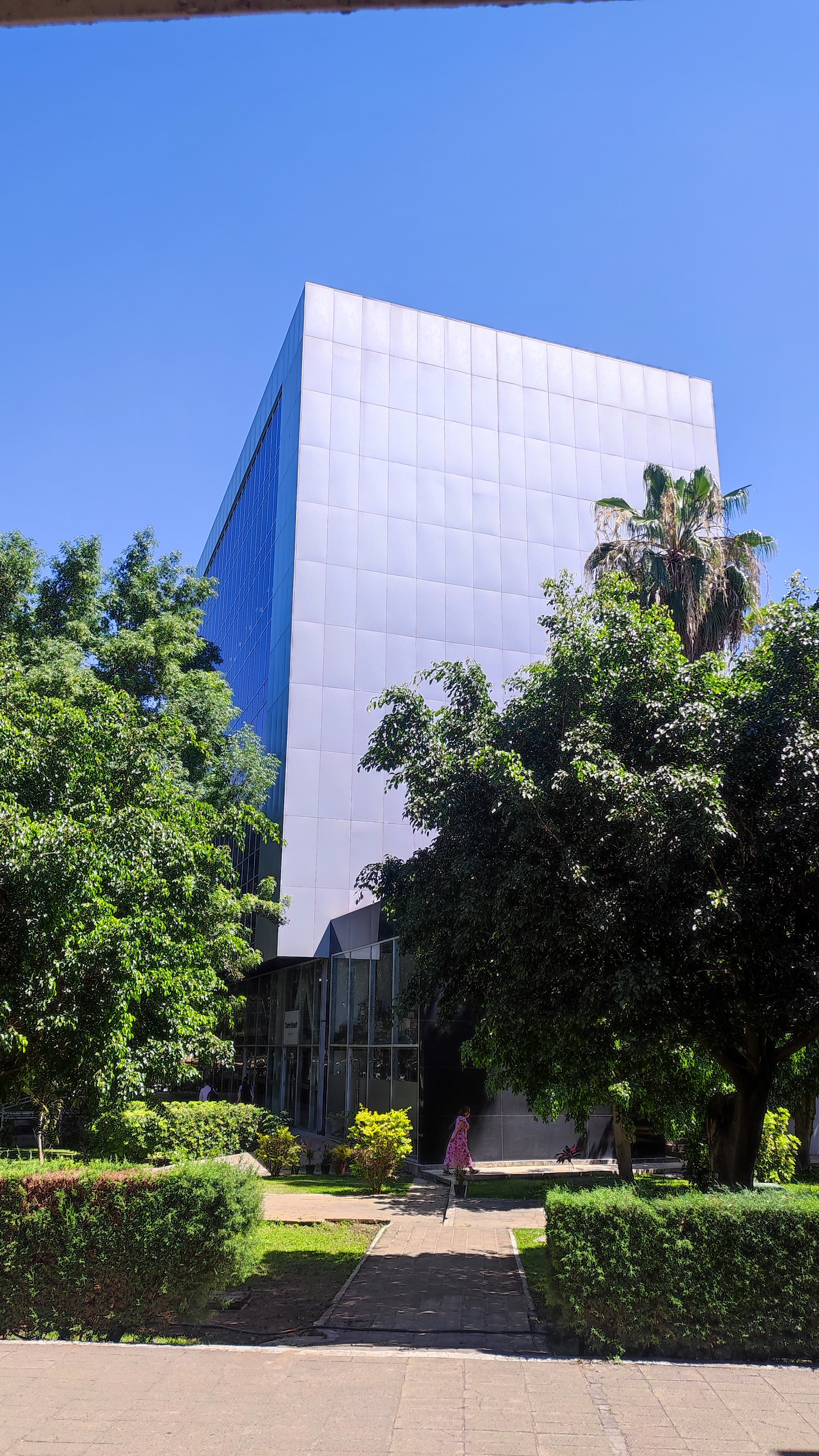
- Smart CUCEA Tower
- Established: 1994
- Affiliations: University of Guadalajara
- University Centre: Luis Gustavo Padilla Montes
- Location: Zapopan, Mexico
- Website: www.cucea.udg.mx

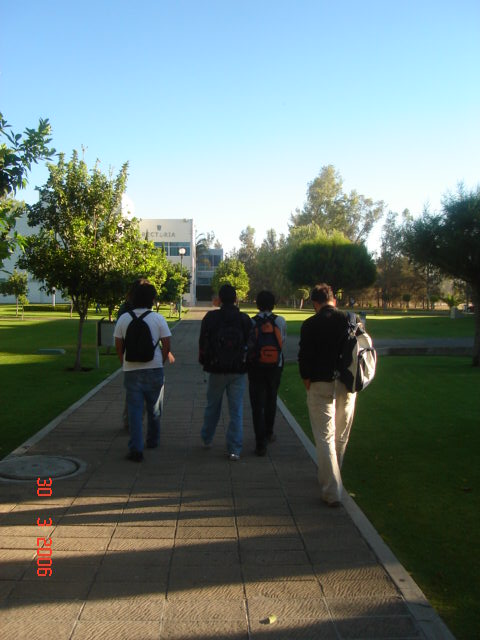
CUCEA's campus

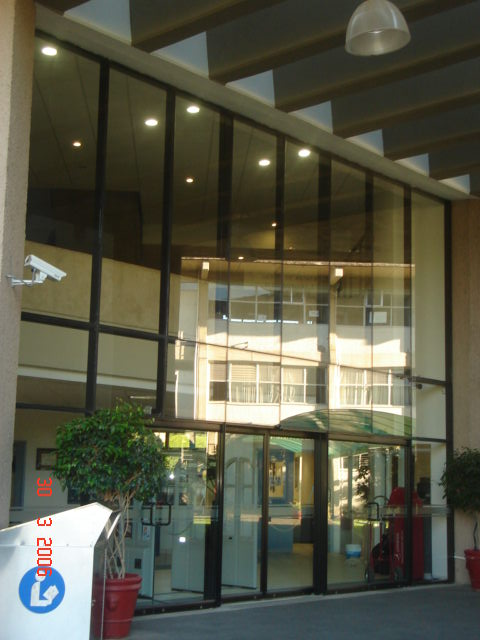
CERI's front façade and entrance

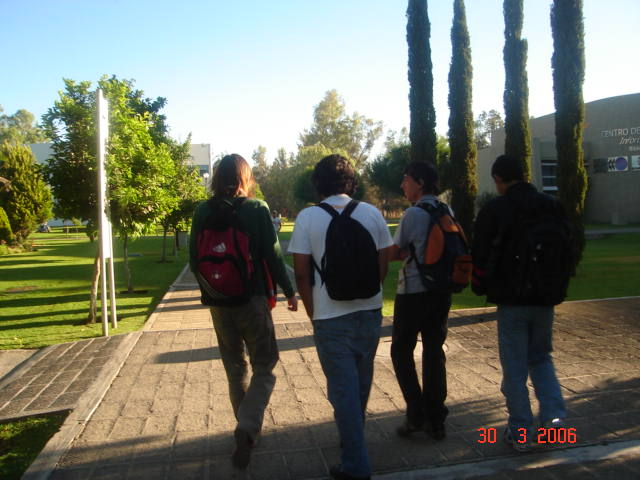
Students walking towards the Dean's tower

The University Centre of Economic and Managerial Sciences (Spanish: Centro Universitario de Ciencias Económico-Administrativas) often abbreviated as CUCEA is the division of the University of Guadalajara where higher education related to Economics, Management and complementary sciences in the relevant fields is provided. The centre has 19 buildings, 169 classrooms for regular lessons, 16 classrooms for PhD programmes and 4 fully equipped auditoriums that altogether can hold more than 900 people.

It also has a "governmental and decision making room" where the academical body gathers and a seminary room, both are equipped to receive and broadcast videoconferences from and to any part of the world, given that they have optic fiber connection to the administrative building of the Universidad de Guadalajara. The CUCEA has 9 investigation centres that link the university with Jalisco's society.

Often credited by the Universidad de Guadalajara students and teachers as being the best centre campus-wise, it also has a high academical level. Even though the claim of being "The best Universidad de Guadalajara Centre" might be disputed on different grounds, it is a fact that the university enjoys a well-deserved prestige. The campus has 2 auditoriums, a cyber-garden where the students can connect their laptops to the internet for free, that area has capacity for 180 people. WiFi coverage is also available in selected areas.

The CUCEA is the Universidad de Guadalajara's centre with the most students, approximately 14,100 regular students and 1,063 studying in PhD programmes. CUCEA employs 800 teachers and 295 people that manage the centre's services.

In late 2006 the construction of new classrooms in the western part of the campus, and refurbishments of both the parking lot and the pedestrian entrance, were underway. The university also hosts the Centre for Marketing and Opinion Surveys (Spanish: Centro de Estudios de Opinión y Mercadotecnia, CEO), the Universidad de Guadalajara's Centre for carrying out an array of surveys for distinct purposes, both for the University and its private clients.

The Centre offers the following academical programmes and degrees:

== Smart CUCEA ==
CUCEA Hallways

The CUCEA Smart Campus Ecosystem is a model that aims to transform the university campus of the Centro Universitario de Ciencias Económico Administrativas (CUCEA) into an intelligent, sustainable, inclusive, and borderless environment, aligned with the concept of a smart city. Inspired by six strategic dimensions (people, life, economy, government, environment, and mobility), this ecosystem integrates advanced technologies to improve education, university management, and relationships with society.

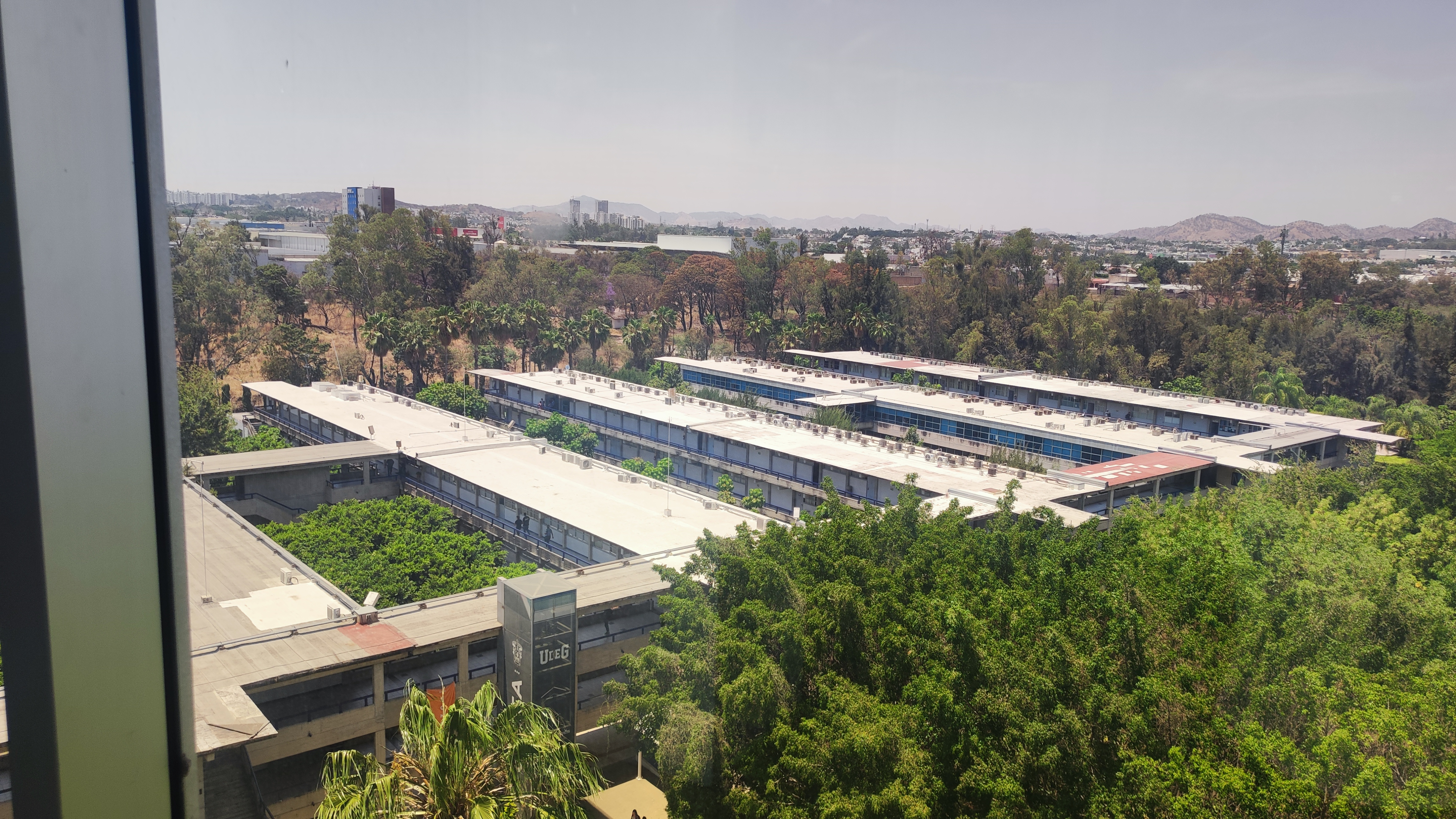
CUCEA from Above

=== General Objective ===
CUCEA's stated objective is to develop into a smart campus focused on innovation, entrepreneurship, and sustainable development.

==== Main Purposes ====
- Implement a hybrid, flexible, and inclusive educational model.
- Create learning environments that make intensive use of technology.
- Promote environmental culture and sustainable development.
- Encourage creativity, art, and sports for holistic development.
- Foster applied research and linkages with society and industry.
- Modernize university governance with a digital and participatory approach.
- Develop an efficient and transparent institutional management system.

==== Ecosystem Pillars ====
- People and community: Placing the university community at the center of the digital ecosystem.
- University life: Promoting coexistence, inclusion, and well-being through technology.
- Economy and innovation: Encouraging entrepreneurship and knowledge transfer.
- Environment and sustainability: Reducing environmental impact and optimizing resources.
- Government and management: Modernizing administrative processes and strengthening digital governance.
- Mobility: Implementing sustainable solutions to improve transport and accessibility.

Finally, the CUCEA Smart Campus aligns with the Sustainable Development Goals (SDGs) of the United Nations, ensuring that its initiatives contribute to social and environmental transformation.

== Undergraduate programs ==
- Management
- Financial Management and Systems
- Governmental Management and Public and Local Policies.
- Public Accountancy
- Economy
- Management and Environmental Economics
- Marketing
- International Business
- Human Resources
- Information Technology
- Tourism
- Public Relations and Communications
- Business Engineering
- Gastronomic Business Management

== Library ==
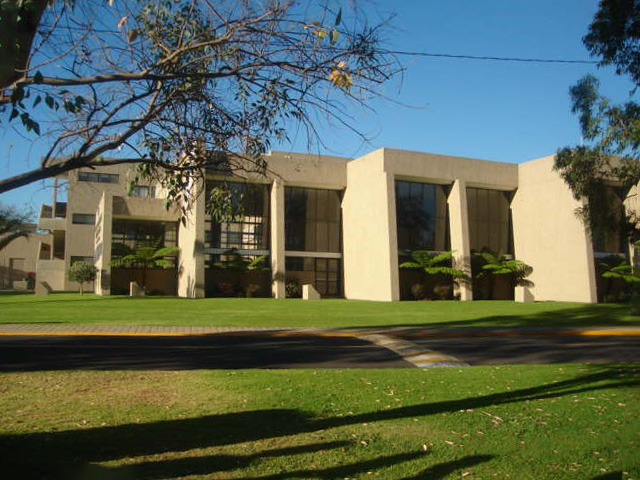
CUCEA's library, the CERI

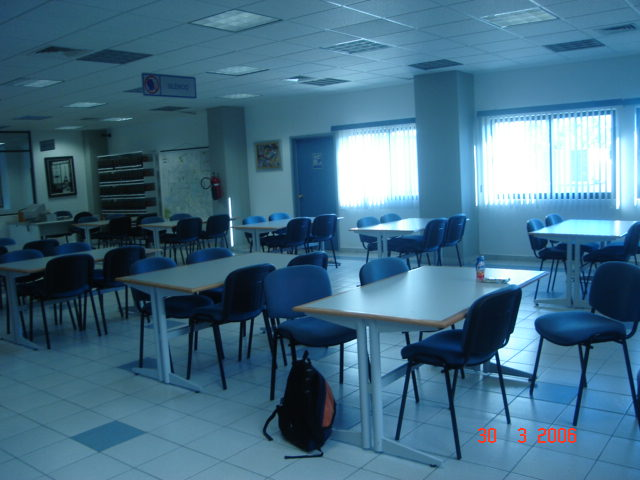
The Benjamin Franklin Library

The campus' library, Informative Resources Centre (Spanish: Centro de Recursos Informativos, CERI) has a selection of economics-related books and also offers the possibility of consulting extensive demographic and geographic data collected by the INEGI related to Mexico.

It has an area for consulting texts and studying capable of holding 450 persons, a video library with more than 800 videos and a collection of selected materials edited by the IMPI and BANCOMEXT. The library also has a United Nations database. The CERI offers access to more than 800 full text, electronic format magazine titles and more than 350 magazine titles in print. The general collection is conformed by 45,000 titles and 87,000 volumes. The Benjamin Franklin library section is located on its third floor, whose content and archives were entirely donated by the American embassy in Guadalajara.

World Bank and International Monetary Fund publications are also within its archives, and cooperation with Mexico's central bank makes possible that important macroeconomic information is available to the campus' students. The current director of the CERI is Francisco Javier Aguilar Ponce, PhD.

The library is open both for students of the University and for the general public, being the only requirement to provide sufficient ID at the entrance of the campus. The general public can only consult the materials though, the right to borrow any publications is exclusively reserved for students of the CUCEA. The library's schedule is Mon-Fri 8:00-21:00 hrs., Sat. 9:00-14:00 hrs.

It is part of the Universidad de Guadalajara network of libraries (from Spanish, "Red de Bibliotecas", REDI).
