= De Mora =

De Mora is a surname. Notable persons with that name include:

- Francisco de Mora (c. 1553–1610), Spanish architect
- Jaime de Mora y Aragón (1925–1995), Spanish aristocrat and actor
- José de Mora (1642–1724), Spanish sculptor
- Juan Gómez de Mora (1586–1648), Spanish architect
- Miguel Gil Moreno de Mora (1967–2000), Spanish cameraman and war correspondent
- Doña Fabiola de Mora y Aragón (1928–2014), Spanish nobility, former Queen of Belgium

== See also ==
- Mora (disambiguation)
- De la Mora
