= Brittni De La Mora =

American former pornographic actress (born 1987)

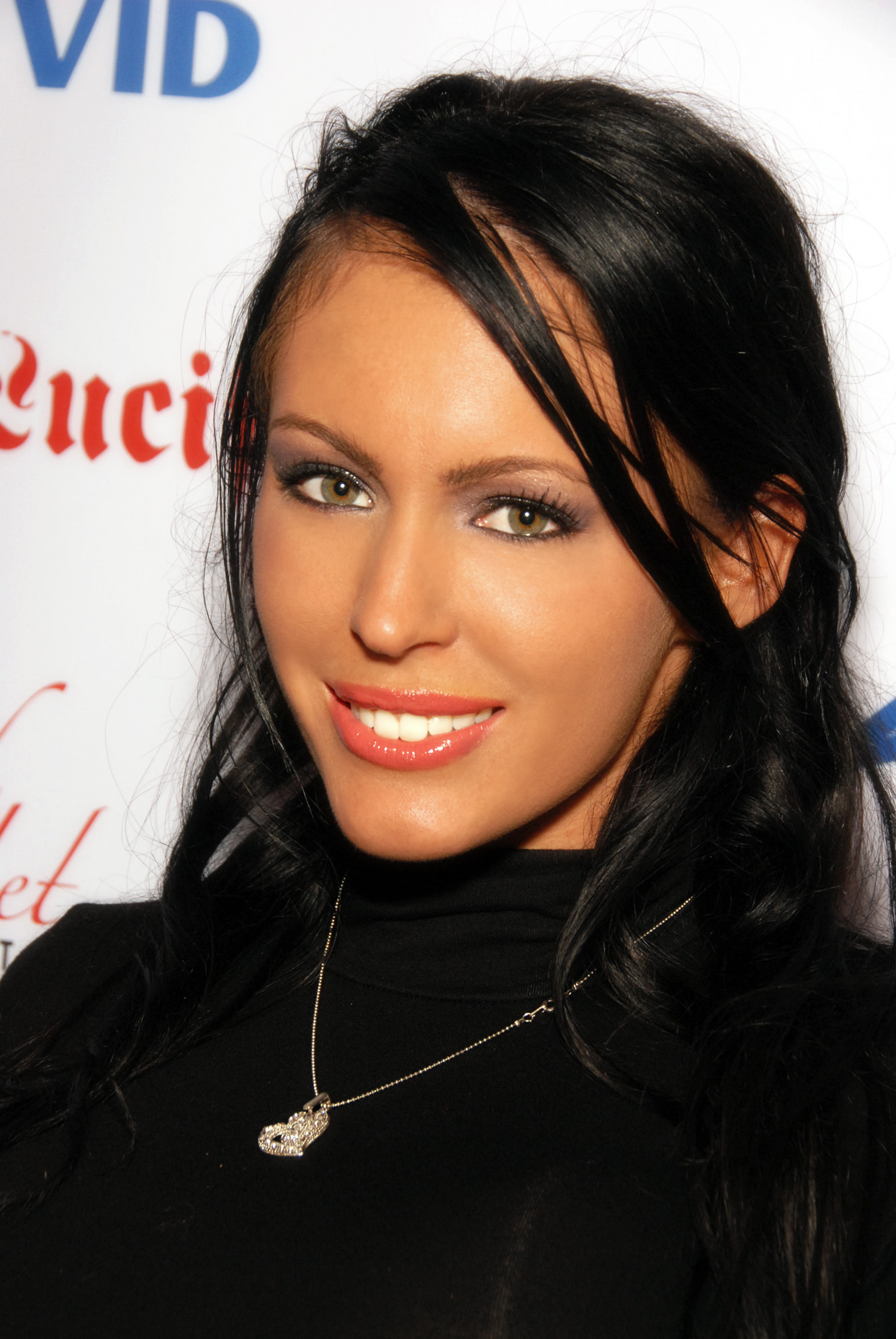
- De La Mora in 2010
- Born: Brittni Ruiz; April 1, 1987 (age 39)
- Other name: Jenna Presley
- Occupation: Pornographic film actress
- Years active: 2005–2012
- Spouse: Richard De La Mora (m. 2016)
- Children: 2
- Website: lovealwaysministries.com

Brittni De La Mora (née Ruiz; born April 1, 1987), known professionally as Jenna Presley, is an American former pornographic film actress. After leaving the pornographic film industry in 2012, she became an evangelical Christian preacher in San Diego.

== Pornographic film career ==
While in college and working at a Santa Barbara strip club, a few producers asked De La Mora if she was interested in making "romance movies". De La Mora entered the adult film industry in September 2005 when she was 18 years old under the name Jenna Presley. In 2010, she was named by Maxim as one of the 12 top female stars in porn. Complex ranked her 17th on its list of "The Top 100 Hottest Porn Stars (Right Now)" in 2011.

During her time in the adult film industry, Presley used crystal meth, heroin, and cocaine (to try to lose weight), as well as ecstasy and oxycontin. She witnessed her boyfriend being fatally stabbed by a motorcycle gang.

Inspired by Rachel Collins, a Christian pastor at XXXchurch.com, De La Mora left the adult film industry in December 2012 after she completed her last scene in Las Vegas.

== Evangelical preaching ==
After leaving the pornographic film industry in 2012, De La Mora began preaching at the evangelical Cornerstone Church of San Diego. In August 2013, she appeared on The View with Craig Gross, a pastor at XXXChurch, to discuss her conversion to Christianity.

== Personal life ==
She married Richard De La Mora, a pastor at Cornerstone Church, in 2016. As of 2018, they reside in San Diego.

== Awards ==
- 2006 NightMoves Awards – Best New Starlet (Fan's Choice)
