= Delamar Flat =

Desert in the Delamar Valley of Nevada

Delamar Flat at 37.3619075°N 114.9244520°W is the geographic sink of the Delamar Wash in the Delamar Valley.
