= Preparatoria Jalisco =

Historic high school located in the center of Guadalajara

Coordinates: 20°40′47.4″N 103°21′01.9″W

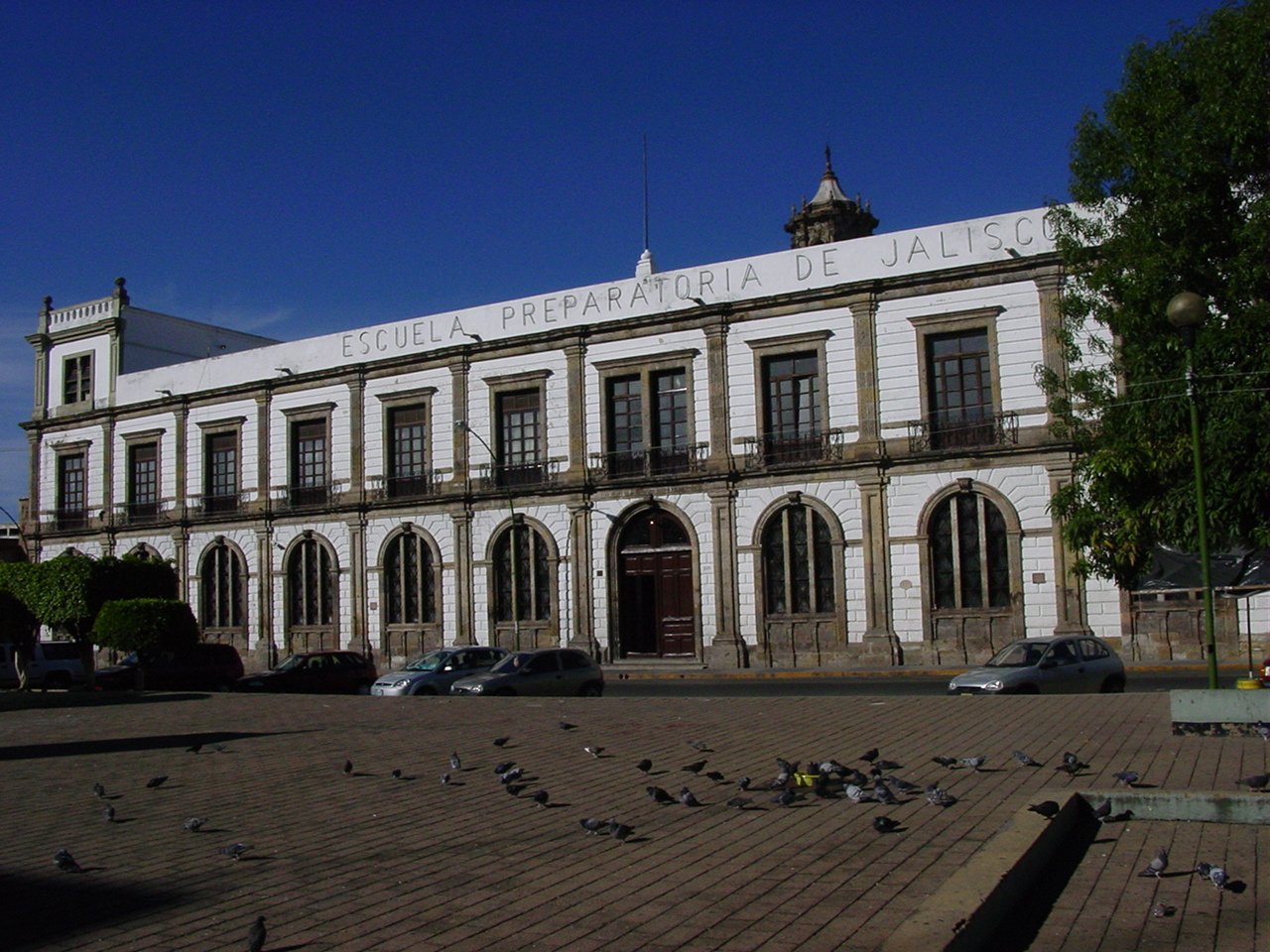
Facade of the Preparatory School of Jalisco, 2009

The Preparatoria De Jalisco is a school upper secondary education located in the historic city centre of Guadalajara in Mexico.

== Foundation ==
In 1720 Pope Clement XI confirmed the creation of an oratorium dictated to Saint Phillip Neri in the city of Guadalajara, Jalisco, which at the time was part of New Spain and capital of the Nueva Galicia Kingdom. Informed of the Pope's decision, King Philip V of Spain announced on 13 August 1721 that construction of the new oratorium would begin.

Prepa Jalisco.

In the early 19th century, the institution existed as the Colegio San Felipe Neri. It was used as a hospital and an orphanage.

On September 15, 1914, the Preparatory School of Jalisco was formally established. Since 1925, it has been a part of the University of Guadalajara. Your Majesty Don Fernando VI de Borbón, King of Spain, ordered the Philippians to move to the Plazuela de la Palma or San Fernando, a place where they would erect a chapel dedicated to the Virgin of the Assumption and where they would also found their school in order to comply with the educational role entrusted to them.

The work was finished little by little, first the single-level school with its patios of Plateresque influence, the Mudejar and later the consecration of the temple that occurred in the year 1802.

The main façade of the school is located on what is now Calle de San Felipe (view to the south), and that the second floor was added later during the fourth decade of the 19th century. The high clergy made it available to the order of the Sisters of Charity, who used it as a hospital for the needy in the period from 1850 to 1867.

Later, the president of the republic, Lic. Benito Juárez, ordered that the old cloister be designated to house the homeless high school. Thus, the presidential provisions were fulfilled and it gave shelter to orphan girls.

Years later it remained in the hands of the Society of Jesus, being used as a school for the third time under the name "Instituto del Señor San José". For this reason, the Jesuits adorned the building, taking on its façade the neoclassical French style, concluding the second floor and equipping the Physics, Chemistry and Biology laboratories that are still preserved.

Special mention deserves the library of the campus, designed by the San Felipe oratories, but completed by the Jesuit priests, carved entirely of ebony wood, with two lathes, moldings and neoclassical finials on its old shelves that kept loose books, volumes and exemplary volumes now incunabula. Don Manuel Macario Diéguez ordered the confiscation of the institute and it was vacated by the Jesuits since August 1, 1914.

On September 10 of that same year, he determined in his decree number 29, the creation of the Preparatory School of Jalisco and the formal delivery of the same was made on Tuesday, September 15, 1914. Since 1925, this school has been part of the real estate heritage of the University of Guadalajara and our tradition gathers in the centenary classrooms, the most illustrious figures of the teachers of all time.
