= Itzel Ríos de la Mora =

Mexican politician

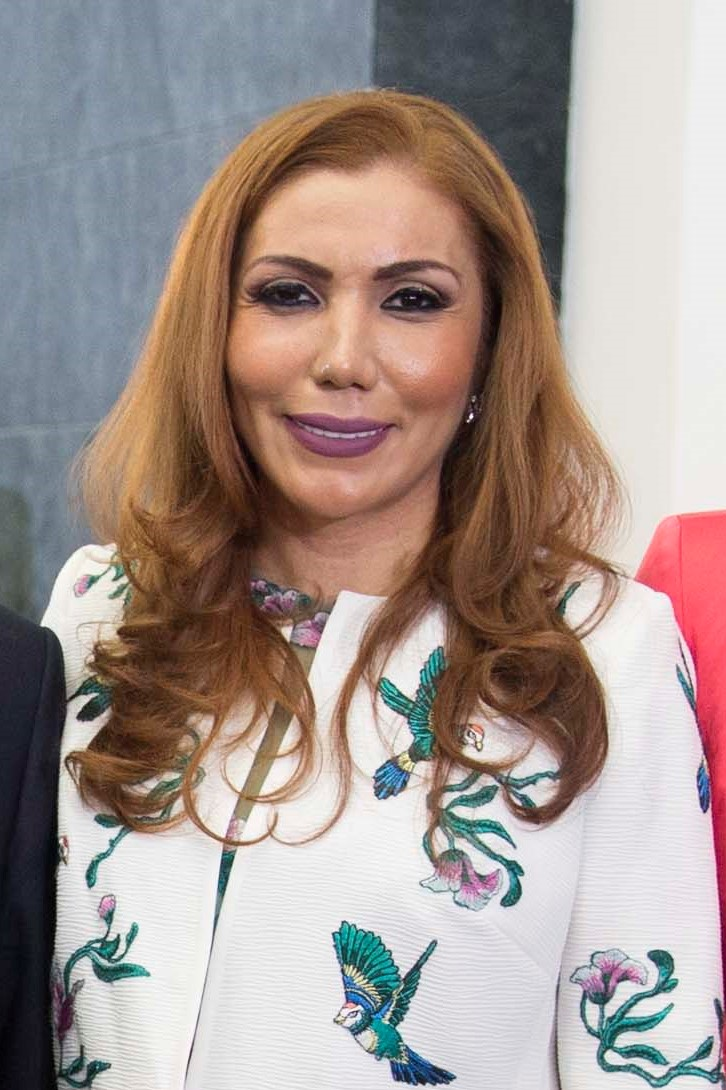
- Born: 31 August 1978 (age 47); Tecomán, Colima, Mexico
- Education: University of Colima
- Occupation: Senator
- Political party: PRI

Itzel Sarahí Ríos de la Mora (born 31 August 1978) is a Mexican politician affiliated with the PRI. She served as Senator of the LXII Legislature of the Mexican Congress representing Colima, and previously served in the LVI Legislature of the Congress of Colima.
