= DeLamar (surname) =

DeLamar, De Lamar de la Mar or Delamar is a topographic byname/surname literally meaning "of/from/by the sea". Notable people with the name include:

- Alice DeLamar
- Fien de la Mar (1898–1964), Dutch actress and singer
- Henry DeLamar Clayton (general)
- Henry De Lamar Clayton Jr.
- José de la Mar (1776–1830), Peruvian military leader
