= Ximena Puente de la Mora =

Mexican lawyer, academic, and researcher (born 1977)

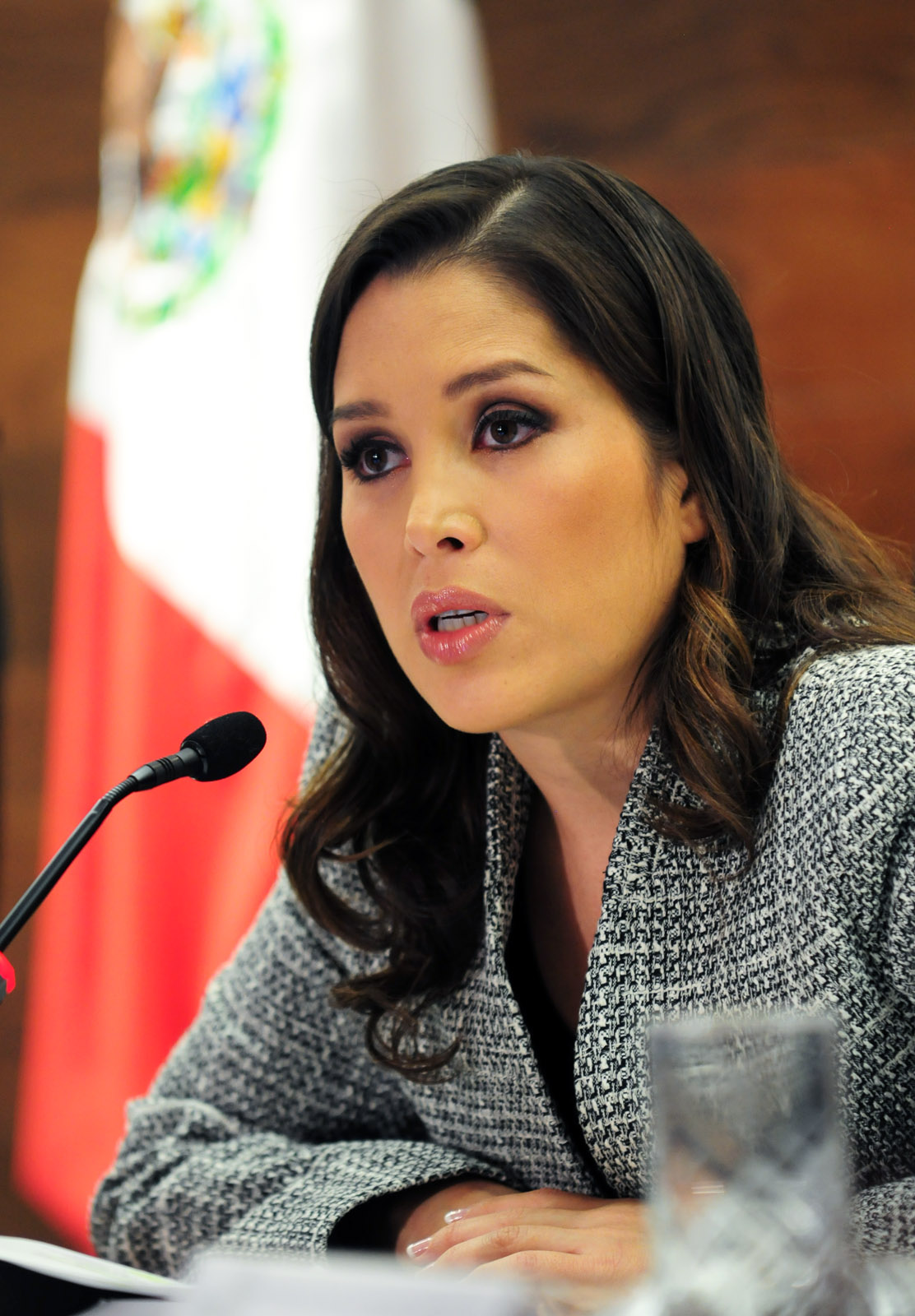

Commissioner of the National Institute of Transparency, Information Access, and Personal Data Protection
- In office May 14, 2014 – May 2017
- Preceded by: Gerardo Laveaga

Personal details
- Born: March 12, 1977 (age 49) Colima, Mexico
- Education: University of Guadalajara
- Occupation: Lawyer, academic, researcher

Ximena Puente de la Mora (born March 12, 1977) is a Mexican lawyer, academic, and researcher who will serve as a proportional representation federal deputy in the LXIV Legislature of the Mexican Congress. Prior to being a federal deputy, she was a commissioner of the Federal Institute of Information Access (Instituto Federal de Acceso a la Información; IFAI) from 2014 to 2016. After the General Law of Transparency and Access to Public Information took effect, this became the National Institute of Transparency, Information Access, and Personal Data Protection (Instituto Nacional de Transparencia, Acceso a la Información y Protección de Datos Personales; INAI), of which she remained president through 2017 and commissioner through March 2018. She holds a degree in law from the University of Colima, a master's in legal sciences from the University of Navarra in Spain, and a PhD in law from the University of Guadalajara.

== Professional and academic career ==
Puente de la Mora was sworn in as commissioner of the Institute of Transparency, Access to Public Information, and Data Protection of the State of Colima on August 9, 2011, in an order that would conclude in 2018. Since January 7, 2014 she has been commissioned president of that agency.

On May 14, 2014, she was appointed commissioner of the Federal Institute of Information Access (IFAI). The next day, the seven commissioners unanimously elected Ximena Puente de la Mora as the agency's president for a term extending until 2016. She has been a level 1 member of the Conacyt National System of Researchers since 2008. She worked as a full-time professor and researcher at the University of Colima School of Law from 2003 to May 2014. Since 2014 she has been part of the International Academic Council of the Latin American Journal of Personal Data Protection.

== Federal deputy candidacy ==
On March 17, 2018, Puente's name appeared on the Institutional Revolutionary Party's list of proportional representation federal deputies from the fifth electoral region, containing her home state of Colima, ahead of the 2018 general election; however, Puente was not an active PRI member. On March 18, she presented her resignation from the agency with just eleven days remaining in her term with the agency. The Senate of the Republic rejected Puente's original resignation letter for failing to specify her starting date with the agency and the reason for her resignation.

The PRI won enough votes in the fifth region to earn seven of the 40 seats for the region, meaning Puente, who was sixth on the party's regional list, was elected, the only candidate from Colima on the list to win office.

== Publications ==
Ximena Puente de la Mora's most recent publications include:

- Los medios electrónicos y el derecho procesal, 2011
- La transparencia como instrumento de ética para superar los índices de corrupción en la Administración Pública, 2011
- Protección de Datos Personales en México ante el modelo Norteamericano y el Europeo, 2011
- Derecho de Acceso a la Información Pública y proceso electoral en la Sociedad Mexicana: consideraciones para su coexistencia en un Sistema Democrático, 2013
