= Delamar Wash =

Coordinates: 37.443574°N 114.883341°W

Location
- State: Nevada

Delamar Wash is the main stream in the Delamar Valley, Nevada, United States.
