= Heart Revolution Church =

Coordinates: 32°39′35″N 117°4′42″W

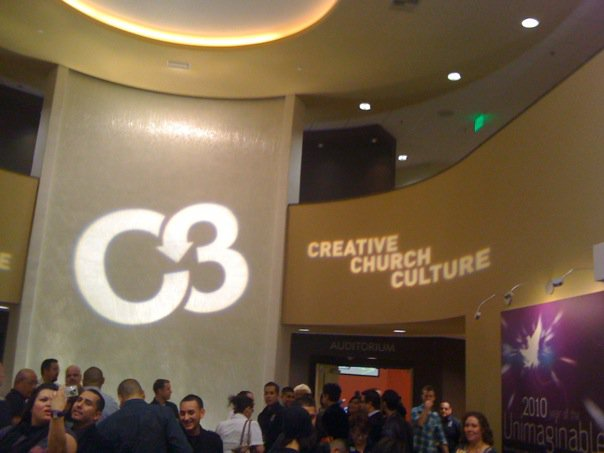
- Heart Revolution Church of San Diego lobby during C3 West Coast Conference
- Heart Revolution Church
- Location: National City, California
- Country: United States
- Denomination: Non-denominational, charismatic
- Website: www.heartrevchurch.com

History
- Founded: 1999
- Founder(s): Sergio & Georgina De La Mora

Specifications
- Capacity: 1,000

Heart Revolution Church is a non-denominational, charismatic megachurch in National City, California.

== History ==
The church was founded as Cornerstone Church of San Diego in 1999 by Sergio De La Mora (born 1966). He and his wife, Georgina de la Mora, were the senior pastors. The church averages about 4000 people in attendance each week. The church was recognized by Outreach magazine as being the third fastest growing church in America during the year 2009. In 2020, Cornerstone Church of San Diego renamed itself as Heart Revolution Church.

In 2021, Pastors TJ and Carissa Anglin took the lead pastor role.

=== Events and broadcasts ===
The church hosts an annual "Heart Revolution Conference". Speakers at the 2010 conference include Hezekiah Walker, Tim Storey, Ed Young Jr., and Steven Furtick. In 2010, the church hosted Ed Young, Jr's C3 West Coast Conference. The church has its 10 a.m. service broadcast locally in San Diego by KPRZ 1210 AM.
