= University of Guadalajara =

Public university in Guadalajara, Jalisco

- Universidad de Guadalajara (UdeG)
- Motto: Piensa y Trabaja (Think and Work)
- Type: Public university
- Established: As Royal University of Guadalajara: 3 November 1792; As University of Guadalajara: 12 October 1925
- Affiliations: ANUIES CUMEX International Association of Universities College Board CONAHEC
- Endowment: MXN $14,803,821,208.00 (2022)
- Rector: Karla Alejandrina Planter Pérez
- Vice-rector: Héctor Raúl Solís Gadea
- Faculty: 15,229
- Students: 281,882 (August 2022)
- Undergraduates: 109,992
- Postgraduates: 6,432
- Other students: 139,520 (high school)
- Location: General Rectory, 976 Juárez Avenue, Zipcode 44100, Guadalajara, Jalisco, Mexico; 20°40′30″N 103°21′32″W
- Campus: 15 university campuses, 60 high schools and a virtual university system
- Nickname: Leones Negros (black lions)
- Sporting affiliations: Club Universidad de Guadalajara
- Website: www.udg.mx

The University of Guadalajara (Spanish: Universidad de Guadalajara, UdeG) is a public research university located in Guadalajara, Jalisco. It was originally established in 1586 and officially founded on 12 February 1791 as the Royal and Pontifical University of Guadalajara. Over the centuries, it has evolved into one of Mexico's leading educational institutions.

The university operates multiple high schools, as well as undergraduate and graduate campuses, which are distributed throughout the state of Jalisco. It is widely regarded as the most significant university in the region. Based on its foundation date, it is the second-oldest university in Mexico, the seventeenth-oldest in North America, and the fourteenth-oldest in Latin America.

Since 1994, the University of Guadalajara has operated under a network model to organize its academic activities. This university network comprises 15 university centers, the Virtual University System, the High School Education System, and the university's general administrative body. During the 2014–2015 academic year, the university had a total enrollment of 255,944 students, including 116,424 undergraduate and graduate students and 139,520 high school students.

== History ==
=== The Royal University of Guadalajara (1791–1821) ===
Royal University of Guadalajara's Coat of Arms

At the time of its foundation in 1586, the college began offering higher education in Guadalajara, making it the first institution in the region to grant academic degrees. The first recorded request to establish a university in Guadalajara was made in 1696 by Friar Felipe Galindo y Chávez, who petitioned King Charles II of Spain to expand the recently founded Royal Seminary of San José. This initiated a century-long process that ultimately led to the establishment of the University of Guadalajara. Chronologically, the university is the second-oldest in Mexico, the seventeenth-oldest in North America, and the fourteenth-oldest in Latin America.

The proposal by Friar Felipe Galindo y Chávez was reconsidered by lawyer Matías Ángel de la Mota Padilla, who, in 1750, successfully involved Guadalajara's city hall in the project. However, the need for a university in Nueva Galicia became more pressing after the expulsion of the Jesuit Order from all Spanish territories in 1767. The Jesuits had managed the two most important colleges in the city: Santo Tomás College and San Juan Bautista College, leaving a significant gap in higher education.

On 12 December 1771, Friar Antonio Alcalde y Barriga arrived in Guadalajara as the new Bishop of Nueva Galicia. He became a key supporter of the university's foundation. In 1775, he responded to an inquiry from King Charles III of Spain, who sought advice on the feasibility of establishing a university in Nueva Galicia. The bishop's response was entirely favorable, and on 18 November 1791, King Charles IV of Spain issued a royal decree officially proclaiming the foundation of the Royal University of Guadalajara.

The royal decree arrived in Nueva Galicia on 26 March 1792, prompting local authorities to celebrate and swiftly renovate Santo Tomás College in preparation for the new university. As a result, the University of Guadalajara was officially founded on 3 November 1792. By mutual agreement between Friar Antonio Alcalde and the President of the Royal Audience, Jacobo de Ugarte y Loyola, José María Gómez y Villaseñor was appointed as the university's first Rector. Academically, the university initially consisted of four faculties: Arts, Theology, Law, and Medicine.

=== The Confrontation between the University of Guadalajara and the Institute of Sciences of the State of Jalisco (1821–1861) ===
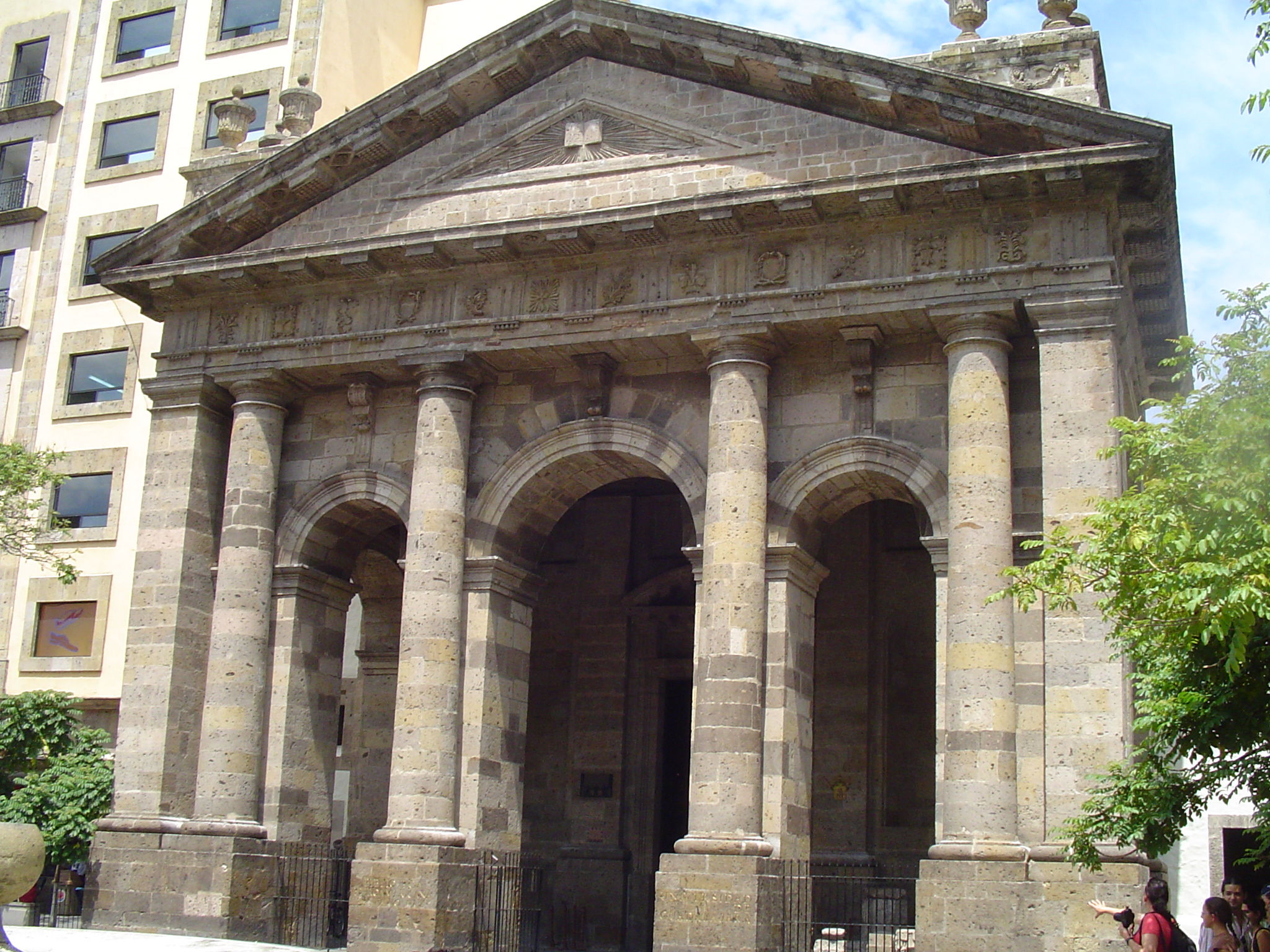
Santo Tomas de Aquino College, first University of Guadalajara's headquarters and current "Octavio Paz" Hispanic Library

The university aligned itself with Agustín de Iturbide's Plan of Iguala, which led to the conclusion of Mexican War of Independence. As a result, it retained its royal status. However, with the proclamation of the First Mexican Empire under Emperor Agustín I, its designation changed to imperial. When the Mexican Republic was later established, the university became a national institution.

On 16 January 1826, during the administration of José Cesáreo de la Rosa as Rector, the Jalisco State Congress issued its first formal decree concerning the University of Guadalajara. Subsequently, the Governor of Jalisco, Prisciliano Sánchez Padilla, reestablished the Institute of Sciences.

However, on 1 September 1834, Governor José Antonio Romero ordered the first reopening of the university and the closure of the Institute of Sciences. Despite this, thirteen years later, in 1847, the State Congress introduced the Public Teaching Program, which called for the closure of both the University of Guadalajara and San Juan Bautista College. The program also proposed the reestablishment of the Institute of Sciences and the founding of two high schools: the Boys' Lyceum and the Ladies' Lyceum.

Nevertheless, the program was never implemented, as Mariano Hurtado persuaded Governor Joaquín Angulo to abandon it. As a result, later that year, a decree was issued allowing the Institute of Sciences and the University of Guadalajara to coexist—though the university lost its funding and headquarters. In 1853, Governor José María Yáñez Carrillo decreed the assimilation of the Institute of Sciences into the University of Guadalajara, restoring the university's traditional assets and status.

Around 1855, following the triumph of the Plan of Ayutla, Governor José Santos Degollado issued the second formal closure of the University of Guadalajara and reestablished the Institute of Sciences. However, during the Reform War, on 2 February 1859, Governor and Commander of Jalisco, Leonardo Márquez, reinstated the University of Guadalajara.

Despite this, following the military success of the liberal faction in 1860, Governor Pedro Ogazón issued the third formal closure of the University of Guadalajara. This decree also reestablished the Institute of Sciences, the Boys' Lyceum, and the Ladies' Lyceum.

=== The University Interregnum (1861–1925) ===
During this period, both higher education and high school education were fully controlled by the Government of Jalisco, which led to the rise of private schools. Despite this, the Schools of Medicine, Law, and Engineering, along with the Boys' Lyceum and the Ladies' Lyceum, continued to offer higher and high school education due to the governmental support they received. This support, however, was not consistent, as some governors, including Ramón Corona and Manuel Macario Dieguez, opposed it. In 1914, Dieguez closed the Lyceums and founded the Preparatoria Jalisco.

=== The University of Guadalajara (1925–1989) ===
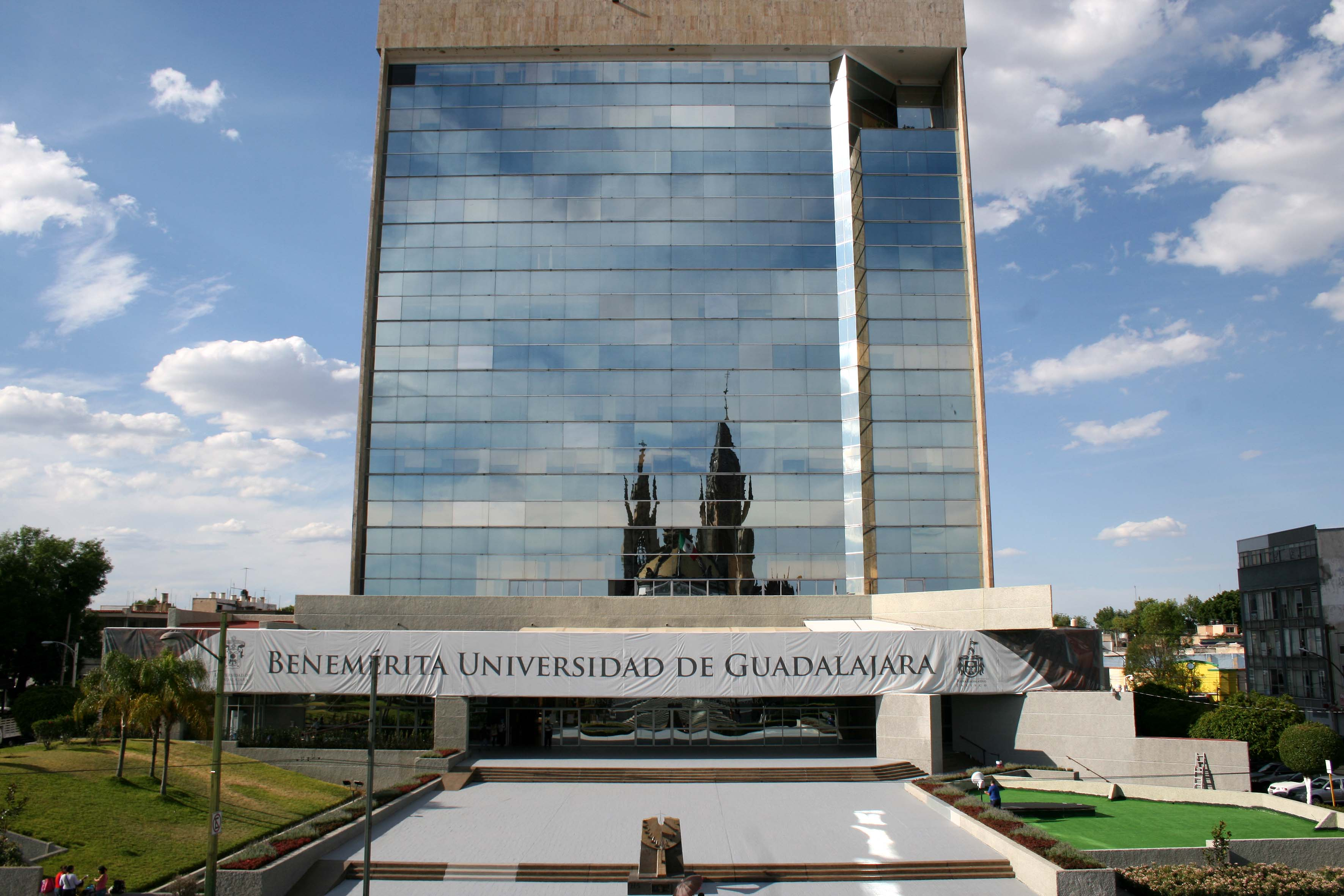
University of Guadalajara's General Rectory Building

In response to concerns expressed by many intellectuals and artists during meetings at the "Centro Bohemio", a conference delivered by Engineer Juan Salvador Agraz Ramírez de Prado on a project to establish the "National University of Guadalajara", and the new directions brought about by the Mexican Revolution of 1910, Governor José Guadalupe Zuno Hernández reopened the University of Guadalajara for the third time in 1925. He appointed Enrique Díaz de León as the university's Rector.

As a result, the study plans for high schools and faculties, as well as the Organic Law, were developed and approved by the State Congress on 7 September 1925. During the university's first meeting of the University Council, the institution's motto was chosen: "Piensa y Trabaja" (Think and Work).

At the First Congress of Universities held in Mexico City, Rector Enrique Díaz de León supported socialist education. However, when he attempted to implement these reforms in Guadalajara, several student protests erupted. In response to the protests, Governor Sebastián Allende decided to close the University of Guadalajara once again.

To prevent the Autonomous University of Guadalajara from adopting the historic name of the University of Guadalajara, the State Congress reopened the university and appointed Constancio Hernández Alvirde as its twenty-ninth Rector.

=== The Jalisco University Network (1989–present) ===
During this period, the need to create a modern, efficient, qualified, and eco-friendly university was recognized. However, this required changes in the academic and administrative structure of the institution. These goals were outlined in the Institutional Development Programme: A Future Vision, presented in 1989 by Rector Raúl Padilla López, who is credited with modernizing the university. The document established the aims and programs for the university's teaching, research, and extension areas, which were based on a series of projected indicators through 1995.

On 2 September 1989, the General University Council approved the document "Bases for the Discussion about the Reform of the University of Guadalajara," which provided a current diagnostic of the university and proposed decentralizing the institution's services and functions across its various entities. The document also presented key elements, including the updating and creation of study plans, the expansion of research and graduate studies, the promotion of cultural and sports activities, and the diversification of financial resources.

This reform was implemented when the State Congress approved the new Organic Law of the University of Guadalajara, which recognized the university's autonomy in areas such as academic planning and financial administration. In the same year, the university created its thematic and regional campuses and established the High School Education System.

Additionally, the Labor Union of the Academic Workers of the University of Guadalajara was established, and the Labor Union of University Workers was strengthened. The Union of University Students was also founded. Among other changes resulting from the creation of the University Network, notable developments included the establishment of the Virtual University System and the University System of Radio, Television, and Cinematography.

In 2014, under the leadership of Rector Itzcóatl Tonatiuh Bravo Padilla, the Institutional Development Programme was updated with projections extending to 2030. Additionally, plans were initiated to build a new regional university campus in Zapotlanejo, Jalisco. Currently, the University Network is present in every region of Jalisco, with campuses located in 109 of the 125 municipalities in the state.

== University government ==
=== General University Council ===
The General University Council is the highest governing body of the university. It is composed of 186 members, chaired by the General Rector, and includes representatives from students, academics, and department heads. Each year, the student and academic representatives in the General University Council are elected through direct and secret suffrage by their peers.

=== General Rector ===
The General Rector is the highest executive authority of the university. The Rector also serves as the university's legal representative and as the president of both the General University Council and the Rectors' Council. The Rector is elected by the members of the General University Council and serves a term of six years, starting on the first day of April.

=== Rectors' Council ===
The Rectors' Council is the body responsible for planning and coordinating the entire University Network. It is composed of the General Rector (who presides over the council), the Executive Vice-Rector, the General Secretary, the headmasters of each university campus, the headmaster of the Virtual University System, and the headmaster of the High School Education System.

== Campuses of the University of Guadalajara ==
Currently, the University of Guadalajara has fifteen undergraduate and graduate campuses. Of these, six specialize in different areas of study and are located in the Guadalajara Metropolitan Area, while eight regional campuses are situated in various regions of the State of Jalisco.

- Thematic
  - CUAAD – University Center of Art, Architecture and Design
  - CUCBA – University Center of Biological and Agricultural Sciences
  - CUCEA – University Center of Economic and Managerial Sciences
  - CUCEI – University Center of Exact Sciences and Engineering
  - CUCS – University Center of Health Sciences
  - CUCSH – University Center of Social Sciences and Humanities

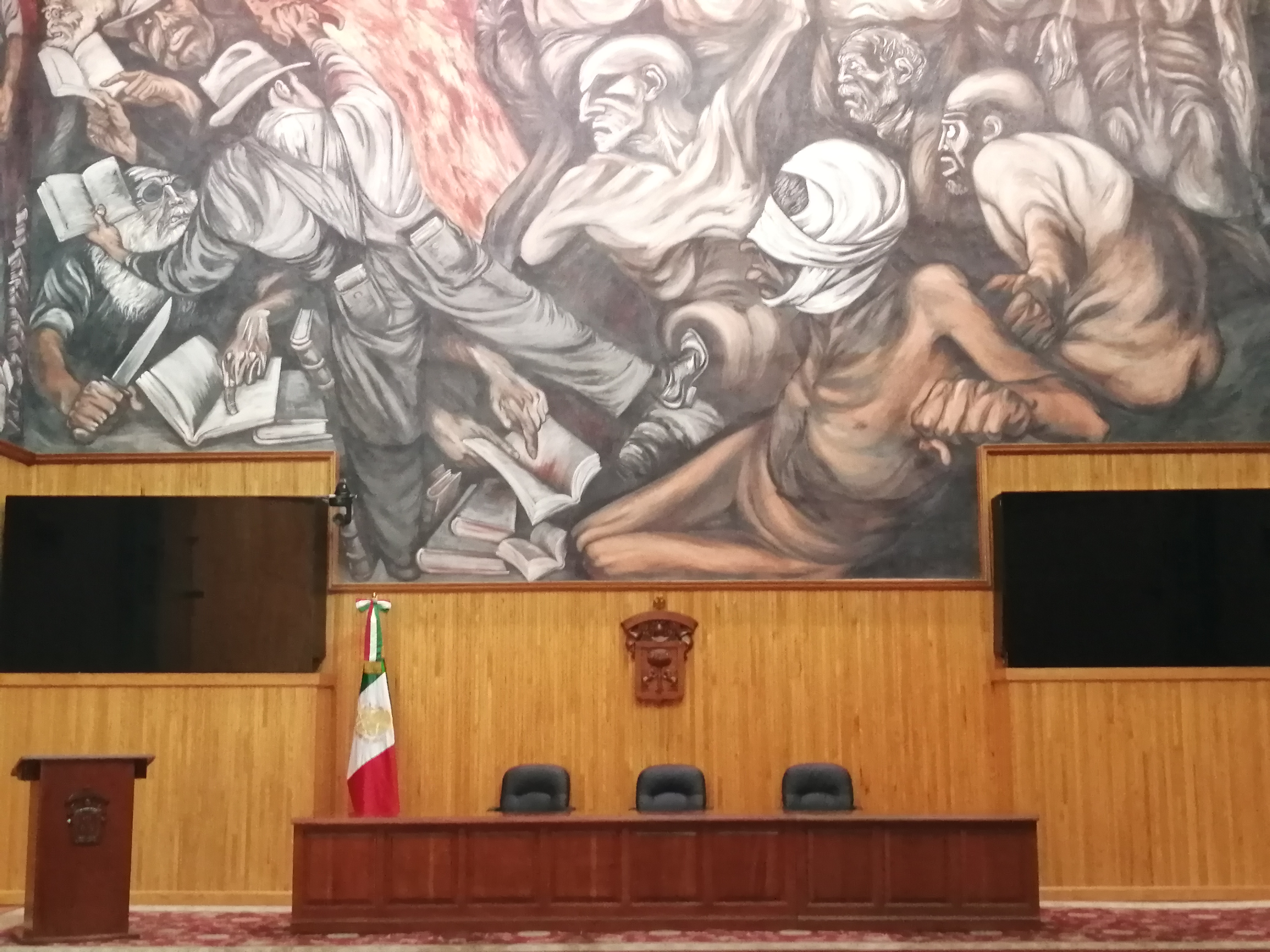
audience

- Regional
  - CUAltos – located in Tepatitlán de Morelos
  - CUCiénega – located in Ocotlán, La Barca and Atotonilco el Alto
  - CUCosta – located in Puerto Vallarta and Tomatlán
  - CUChapala– located in Chapala
  - CUGDL – located in Guadalajara
  - CUCSur – located in Autlán
  - CULagos – located in Lagos de Moreno y San Juan de los Lagos
  - CUNorte – located in Colotlán
  - CUSur – located in Ciudad Guzmán
  - CUTlaquepaque - located in Tlaquepaque
  - CUTonala – located in Tonalá
  - CUValles – located in Ameca

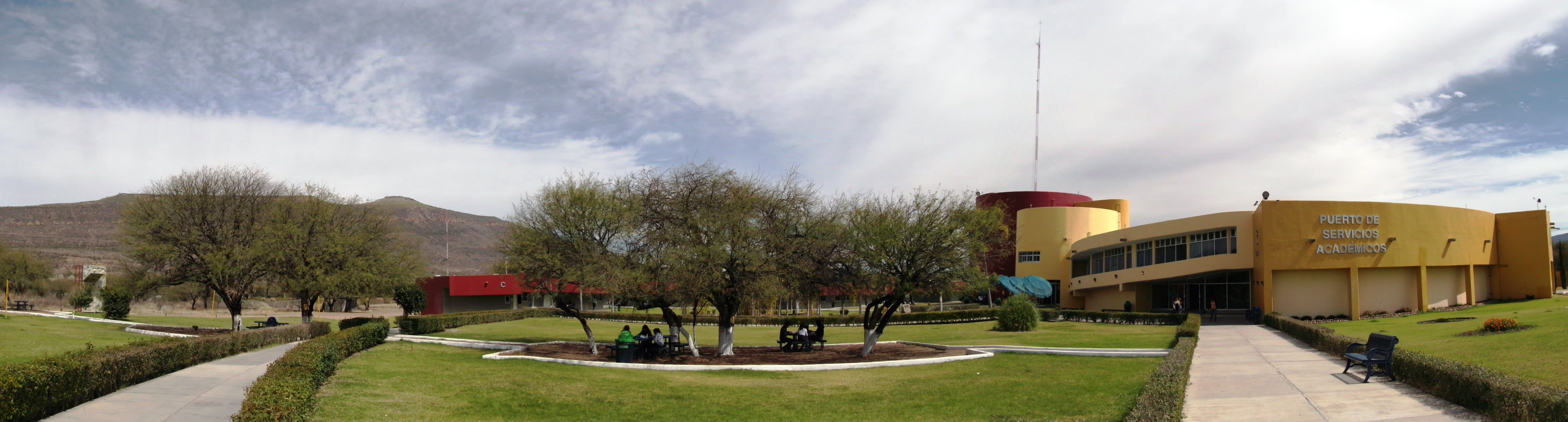
CUNorte, located in Colotlán

== Mid-High Education System ==
Also known as the Baccalaureate Education System (from the Spanish literal translation), this branch of the University Network is responsible for the instruction and dissemination of baccalaureate education since the institutional restructuring in 1994. In the 2015-2016 period, it was composed of 166 schools located in 109 municipalities across Jalisco. These schools include: 24 metropolitan high schools, 36 regional high schools, 4 metropolitan offices, 78 regional offices, and 24 regional extension centers.

The total number of students enrolled in this period was 135,244, who are studying one of the 24 high school education options. Additionally, the system oversees approximately one hundred incorporated high schools, which are officially recognized by this body.

- Metropolitan Baccalaureate Schools
  - Preparatoria Jalisco
  - High School No.2
  - High School No.3
  - High School No.4
  - High School No.5
  - High School No.6
  - High School No.7
  - High School No.8
  - High School No.9
  - High School No.10
  - High School No.11
  - High School No.12
  - High School No.13
  - High School No.14
  - High School No.15
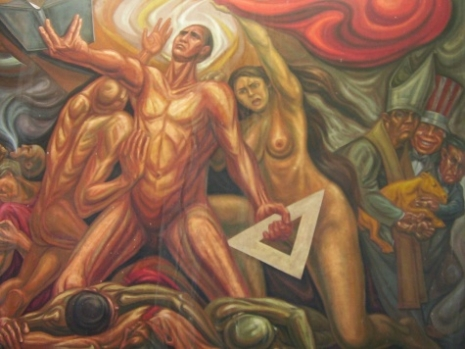
    Mural painted in 1972 by Guillermo Chavez Vega inside the Jalisco High School
  - High School No.16
  - High School No.17
  - High School No.18
  - High School No.19
  - High School No.20
  - High School No.21
  - High School No.22
  - Tonalá High School
  - Northern Tonalá High School
  - South Tonala High School
  - Polytechnic High School of Guadalajara
  - Jorge Matute Remus Polytechnic High School
  - Vocational High school
- Regional Baccalaureate Schools
  - Ahualulco de Mercado Regional High School
  - Ameca Regional High School
  - Arandas Regional High School
  - Atotonilco Regional High School
  - Autlán de Navarro Regional High School
  - Casimiro Castillo Regional High School
  - Chapala Regional High School
  - Cihuatlán Regional High School
  - Ciudad Guzmán Regional High School
  - Colotlán Regional High School
  - Degollado Regional High School
  - El Grullo Regional High School
  - El Salto Regional High School
  - Etzatlán Regional High School
  - Jamay Regional High School
  - Huejuquilla el Alto Regional High School
  - Jalostotitlán Regional High School
  - Jocotepec Regional High School
  - La Barca Regional High School
  - Lagos de Moreno Regional High School
  - Ocotlán Regional High School
  - Puerto Vallarta Regional High School
  - San Juan de los Lagos Regional High School
  - San Martín de Hidalgo Regional High School
  - San Miguel el Alto Regional High School
  - Santa Anita Regional High School
  - Sayula Regional High School
  - Tala Regional High School
  - Tamazula de Gordiano Regional High School
  - Tecolotlán Regional High School
  - Tepatitlán Regional High School
  - Tequila Regional High School
  - Tlajomulco de Zuñiga Regional High School
  - Toluquilla Regional High School
  - Tuxpan Regional High School
  - Villa Corona Regional High School
  - Unión de Tula Regional High School
  - Zacoalco de Torres Regional High School
  - Zapotiltic Regional High School
  - Zapotlanejo Regional High School
  - Wixárika School of Higher Education
  - High School of San José del Valle de Tlajomulco de Zúñiga
  - Regional High School of Ahualulco de Mercado

== Virtual University System ==
The Virtual University System (VUS), commonly known as UDGVirtual in Spanish, is a decentralized body of the University of Guadalajara responsible for administering and developing distance education programmes. These programs include baccalaureate education (Baccalaureate by Competencies Online) as well as higher education, covering both undergraduate and postgraduate curricula.

The Virtual University System (VUS) has a presence in 108 municipalities of Jalisco, all 32 federal entities of Mexico, and ten countries worldwide. There are 3,953 undergraduate and graduate students enrolled in Mexico, with 69% (2,768 students) residing in Jalisco. After Jalisco, the states with the highest enrollment are the State of Mexico with 9% (349 students) and Mexico City with 4% (167 students).

Among all students enrolled in educational programmes, 43 are studying abroad: 27 in the United States, 4 in Ecuador, 3 in Colombia, 2 in Spain, 2 in Canada, and the remaining students in Bulgaria, Chile, Peru, Puerto Rico, and the Dominican Republic. Of these 43 students, 32 are Mexican nationals residing abroad, including 1 in Bulgaria, 2 in Canada, 2 in Spain, 25 in the United States, 1 in Puerto Rico, and 1 in the Dominican Republic. Additionally, the student population includes 28 foreign nationals, of whom 17 reside in Mexico, while 11 study remotely from their home countries.

== Educational programmes ==
Currently, the University of Guadalajara offers a wide range of educational programmes at the high school, undergraduate, and graduate levels. As of the first period of 2015, the university provides the following educational programmes:

- 30 High School Programmes
  - 2 General High School
  - 11 Technologic High School
  - 3 Middle Professional
  - 11 Technical
  - 3 Technical Professional
- 141 Undergraduate Programmes
  - 108 Bachelor
  - 33 High Technical
- 211 Graduate Programmes
  - 63 Specialties
  - 106 Masters
  - 42 PhDs

== Scientific research ==
During the 2014–2015 academic period, the University of Guadalajara had 1,640 researchers, 852 of whom were members of the National System of Researchers. Additionally, the university houses several research institutes and centers, which are listed in the following section, categorized according to their respective university campuses.

- CUAAD
  - Center of Metropolitan Studies
  - Institute of Studies about Historic Centers
  - Institute of Aesthetics Studies
- CUCBA
  - Center of Ground Ecosystems Studies
  - Center of Molecular Genetics Studies
  - Institute of Animal Biotechnology
  - Institute of Botanics
  - Institute of Seed's Science and Technology
  - Institute of Cellular Physiology
  - Institute of Limnology
  - Institute of Management and Exploitation of Fitogenetic Resources
  - Institute of Environment and Human Communities
  - Institute of Neurobiology
  - Institute of Neurosciences
- CUCEA
  - Center of Social and Economic Studies
  - Center for the Quality and Innovation of Higher Education
  - Institute of Public Policies and Government Studies
  - Institute for the Development of Innovation and Technology in Small and Medium Enterprises
- CUCEI
  - Institute of Astronomy and Meteorology
  - Institute of Seismic Engineering
- CUCS
  - Institute of Chronic Degenerative Diseases
  - Institute of Biomedical Sciences Studies
  - Institute of Odontology Studies
  - Institute of Translational Neurosciences
- CUCSH
  - Center of Gender Studies
  - Center of Strategic Studies for the Development
  - Center of North America Studies
  - Institute of Innovation and Governance Studies
- CUCiénega
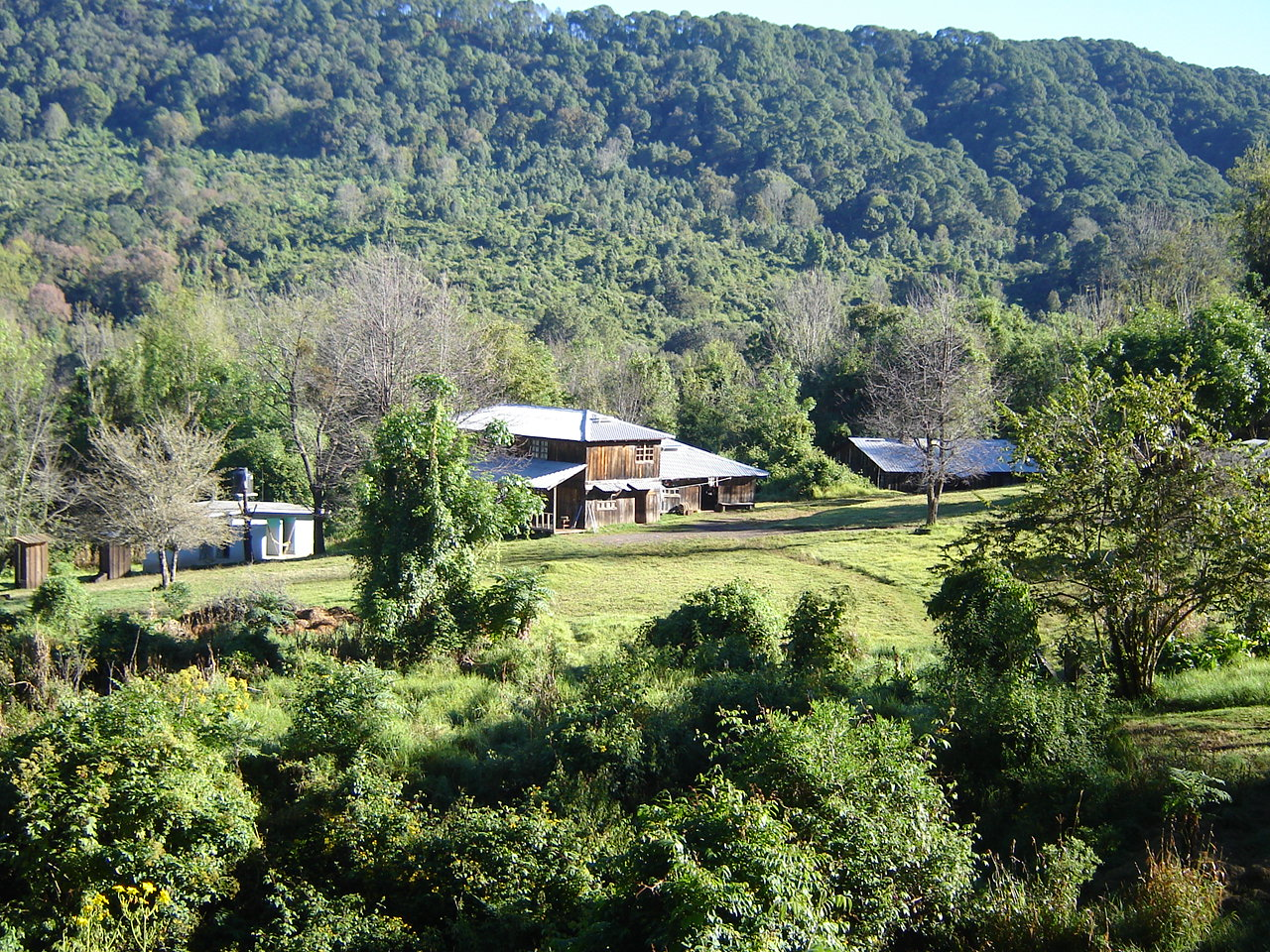
  IMECBIO was originated from the Natural Laboratory "Las Joyas de la Sierra de Manatlan" created in 1985, whose objective was the preservation of the Manatlan Mountain Chain's biosphere. The Laboratory transferred its headquarters to El Grullo and then incorporated to CUCSur in 1995
  - Center of Design of the Business Incubator
  - Center of Innovation, Incubation and Design
  - Institute of Genetics
- CUCSur
  - Manantlan Institute of Ecology and Biodiversity Preservation (IMECBIO)
- CUCosta
  - Center of Western Seismology and Volcanology Studies
- CULagos
  - Center of Psychological Support for the Community
- CUSur
  - Center of Nourish Behavior and Nourishment Studies
  - Research Center in Molecular Biology of Chronic Diseases (CIBIMEC)
- CUTonalá
  - Institute of Water and Energy
- CUValles
  - Center of Entrepreneurship and Incubation
  - Center of Nanosciences and Nanotechnologies Studies
- VUS
  - Institute for Management of Knowledge and Apprenticeship through Virtual Environments

== Scientific journals ==
The University of Guadalajara publishes a diverse range of scientific research journals, including five journals indexed in the Scientific and Technological Journals Index of the National Science and Technology Council.

- EconoQuantum: A biannual journal of business and economics, published by the Department of Quantitative Methods of the Master in Economics at CUCEA. It features academic articles in English and Spanish, focusing on the application of quantitative methods in business and economics.
- México y el Cuenca del Pacífico (Mexico and the Pacific Basin): A quarterly journal founded in 1998 by the Department of Pacific Studies at CUCSH. It covers topics related to economics, international relations, politics, society, and culture in the Asia-Pacific region, using an interdisciplinary approach.
- Comunicación y Sociedad (Communication and Society): A biannual journal specializing in social communication studies, featuring contributions from national and international researchers. It is published by the Department of Social Communication Studies at CUCSH.
- Espiral: Estudios sobre Estado y Sociedad (Espiral: State and Society Studies): A quarterly scientific research journal from the State and Society Division of CUCSH. It is open to national and international social sciences researchers.
- Apertura: Revista de Innovación Educativa (Apertura: Educational Innovation Journal): A scientific research journal published by the Virtual University System, covering topics related to unconventional educational practices, particularly those based on new communication and information technologies.

== University chairs ==
The University of Guadalajara offers several academic chairs that are freely accessible to both the university community and the general public.

- Émile Durkheim Chair
- Fulbright-García Robles US Studies Chair
- Hugo Gutiérrez Vega Chair
- Jorge Alonso Chair
- José Martí Chair
- Julio Cortázar Latin American Chair
- Primo Levi Chair
- UNESCO Chairs: Established as part of a UNESCO initiative approved in 1992, the UNESCO Chairs aim to enhance research and development programs in higher education by fostering university networks and promoting inter-university cooperation through knowledge sharing. The University of Guadalajara currently hosts four UNESCO Chairs:
  - Chair on Media and Information Literacy and Intercultural Dialogue (held at CUCSH)
  - Chair on Gender, Leadership, and Equity (held at CUCEA)
  - Chair on Equality and Non-Discrimination (held at CUCSH)
  - Chair on Youth (held at CUCEA)

== University sports ==
The University of Guadalajara possesses a vast sports infrastructure that supports both individual and team disciplines. The university is a co-owner of the Jalisco Stadium and maintains numerous university teams and sports facilities, which are distributed across its campuses and high schools.

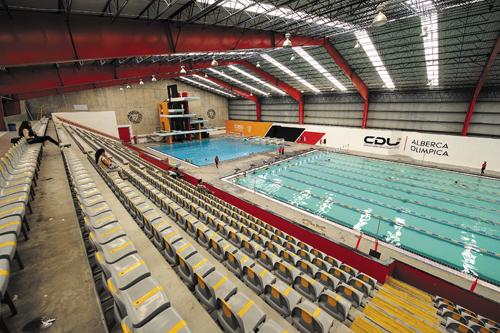
Olympic Swimming Pool at the University Sports Complex

=== University Sports Complex ===
The complex's facilities, located in the area where CUCEI, the Vocational High School, and the Polytechnic High School are situated, offer a variety of physical activities for both the university community and the general public. These activities include athletics, basketball, boxing, gymnastics, volleyball, swimming, and diving.

=== UdeG Sports Club ===
Located near La Primavera Forest, the club provides services to academics, administrators, students, and the general public. It aims to offer a space for rest, recreation, physical training, and cultural activities through its facilities, which include an Olympic pool, diving pit, football stadium, tennis courts, basketball courts, racquetball courts, volleyball courts, squash courts, a bicycle path, a restaurant, a camping area, and other amenities.

=== Aquatic Center for Rehabilitation and Rescue ===
The center features facilities for aquatic activities and physical training, offering services to both internal and external users. It provides swimming courses for all ages, specializing in freestyle, diving, and rescue. Additionally, physical training is available across a wide range of disciplines, supported by professional trainers.

=== University of Guadalajara's Leones Negros ===
The University of Guadalajara owns the Leones Negros, a football team that currently competes in the Mexican Ascenso League. However, it was not until 2014 that the Leones Negros returned to the Primera División after a 20-year absence. Despite this achievement, the team was relegated back to the Ascenso League following the 2015 championship. The team serves as a means to engage the university community and promote a sports culture within the institution.

=== Estadio Ciudad UdeG ===
The University of Guadalajara will be a co-owner of Estadio Ciudad UdeG, a new stadium with a capacity of 40,000 spectators that is expected to open in 2030. The new venue will serve as the home ground for Leones Negros UdeG and Atlas F.C., and will be located in Ciudad UdeG, a new district connecting various educational, cultural, entertainment, and sports spaces involving the university.

== UDG Culture ==
UDG Culture is the division of the University of Guadalajara dedicated to fostering and promoting culture, as well as all forms of artistic expression. Its mission is to provide spaces that stimulate artistic creation and to generate platforms for social interaction to develop and sustain cultural and artistic representations. Currently, UDG Culture collaborates with public and private institutions, national and international organizations, cultural creators, artistic promoters, civil society organizations, social organizations, and the campuses of the University of Guadalajara Network. These collaborations work together to create cultural projects generated by the Music, Performing Arts, and Literature Divisions.

=== Folkloric Ballet of the University of Guadalajara ===
In 1960, several dance couples organized to form a group representing the Visual Arts College. In 1966, the Rector, Ignacio Maciel Salcedo, officially named this group the Folkloric Ballet of the University of Guadalajara. The Ballet's mission is to promote and preserve Mexican cultural traditions, expressed through music and dance, by recreating elements of everyday life from various Mexican regions in its choreographies.

Currently, the Ballet is composed of fifteen couples of dancers and twelve couples of singers. The resident group and the children's ballet are both made up of the same number of dancers and singers. In total, the Ballet includes 168 artists trained in dance or music.

=== Editorial Universitaria ===
Editorial Universitaria is the publishing house of the University of Guadalajara, responsible for publishing academic texts, manuals, monographs, and a wide variety of books. Through these publications, Editorial Universitaria aims to disseminate knowledge and enhance teaching and research trends among the university's students and faculty. Additionally, since its publications reflect the institution's profile, it contributes to promoting the university's image within society.

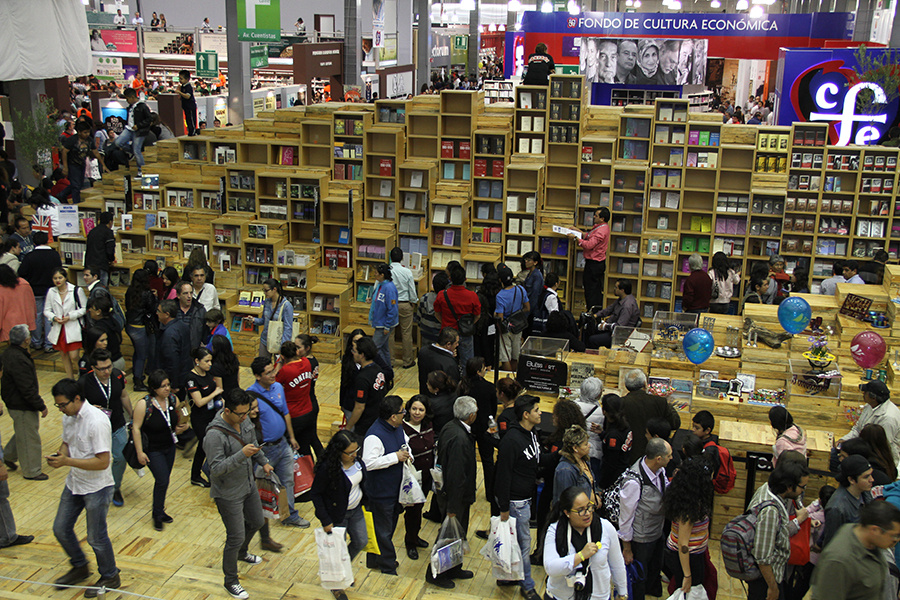
Guadalajara International Book Fair 2013

=== Guadalajara International Book Fair ===
Created in 1987 as an initiative of the University of Guadalajara, the Guadalajara International Book Fair is now the largest international book market for Spanish-language publications. Each year, editors, literary agents, reading promoters, translators, book dealers, and librarians attend the event to engage in commercial and professional interactions. Additionally, approximately 600,000 people visit the fair annually, which takes place over nine days and is considered one of the most important cultural events in Latin America.

The fair is also a significant opportunity to strengthen the cultural ties between Mexico, Hispano-America, and other regions. Since 1993, the fair has invited a region or country as the guest of honor, showcasing the best of its publishing and artistic productions. The following regions and countries have served as guests of honor: Colombia (1993), New Mexico (1994), Venezuela (1995), Canada (1996), Argentina (1997), Puerto Rico (1998), Chile (1999), Spain (2000), Brazil (2001), Cuba (2002), Quebec (2003), Catalan Culture (2004), Peru (2005), Andalusia (2006), Colombia (2007), Italy (2008), Los Angeles (2009), Castile and León (2010), Germany (2011), Chile (2012), Israel (2013), Argentina (2014), and the United Kingdom (2015).

=== Guadalajara International Film Festival ===
The Guadalajara International Film Festival is the most important cinematographic event in Latin America due to the significant initiatives it offers to the film industry. The festival serves as a forum for training, instruction, and creative exchange between professionals, international film critics, and Hispanic students. It is hosted by the University of Guadalajara, the Mexican Institute of Cinematography, the National Council for Culture and Arts, the Jalisco State Government, the Zapopan and Guadalajara City Halls, and Cinépolis.

=== Papirolas Creative Festival for Youth and Children ===
Papirolas began in 1995 as part of the Guadalajara International Book Fair with the aim of creating an exclusive area for youth and children through interactive exhibits and diverse artistic performances. Since 2010, Papirolas has included exhibitions, and in 2011, it began offering training programs for teachers and cultural agents.

=== International Fair of Music Professionals ===
This fair emerged as a professional platform for the development of the Mexican and Latin American music industry. It hosts several concerts, markets, and conferences, serving as a meeting point for industry professionals such as composers, musicians, audio engineers, record labels, producers, and editors.

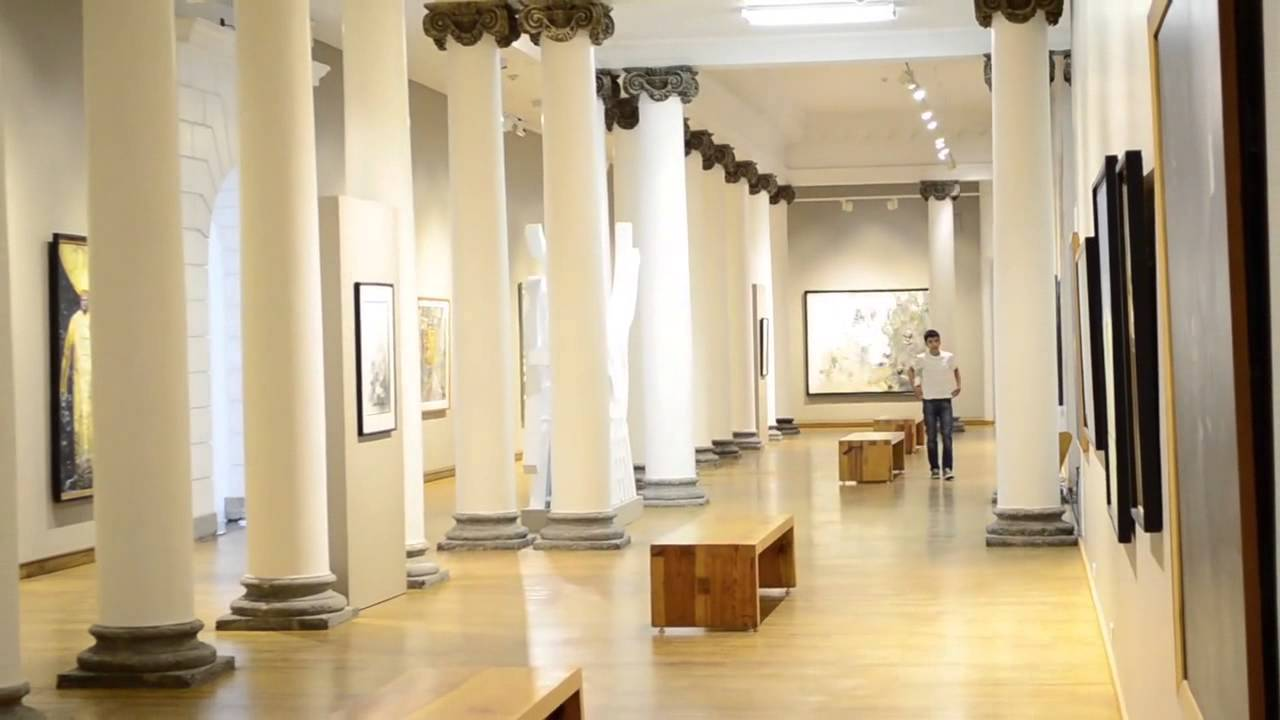
MUSA

=== Arts Museum (MUSA) ===
With the aim of providing the Jalisco community with a space for cultural presentations in a facility that houses significant works by the muralist José Clemente Orozco, the Rector of the University of Guadalajara, Raúl Padilla López, arranged to convert the ground floor of the General Rectory Building into a museum. In 1994, the area was inaugurated as a museum, which has since hosted numerous national and international contemporary art exhibitions by various artists. Additionally, the museum has its own collection of contemporary art from Jalisco.

On 28 February 2013, the General University Council of the University of Guadalajara modified the use of the building known as the General Rectory Building to dedicate it entirely to cultural representations. Following this change, the building's name was updated to the University of Guadalajara's Arts Museum.

=== Jorge Martinez Arts Laboratory ===
The Arts Laboratory is a space dedicated to exhibiting interdisciplinary arts, and it operates under the Arts and Humanities Division of CUAAD. The laboratory's goal is to promote projects that experiment with aesthetics through the creation of a critique forum for research and collaboration among the division's students.

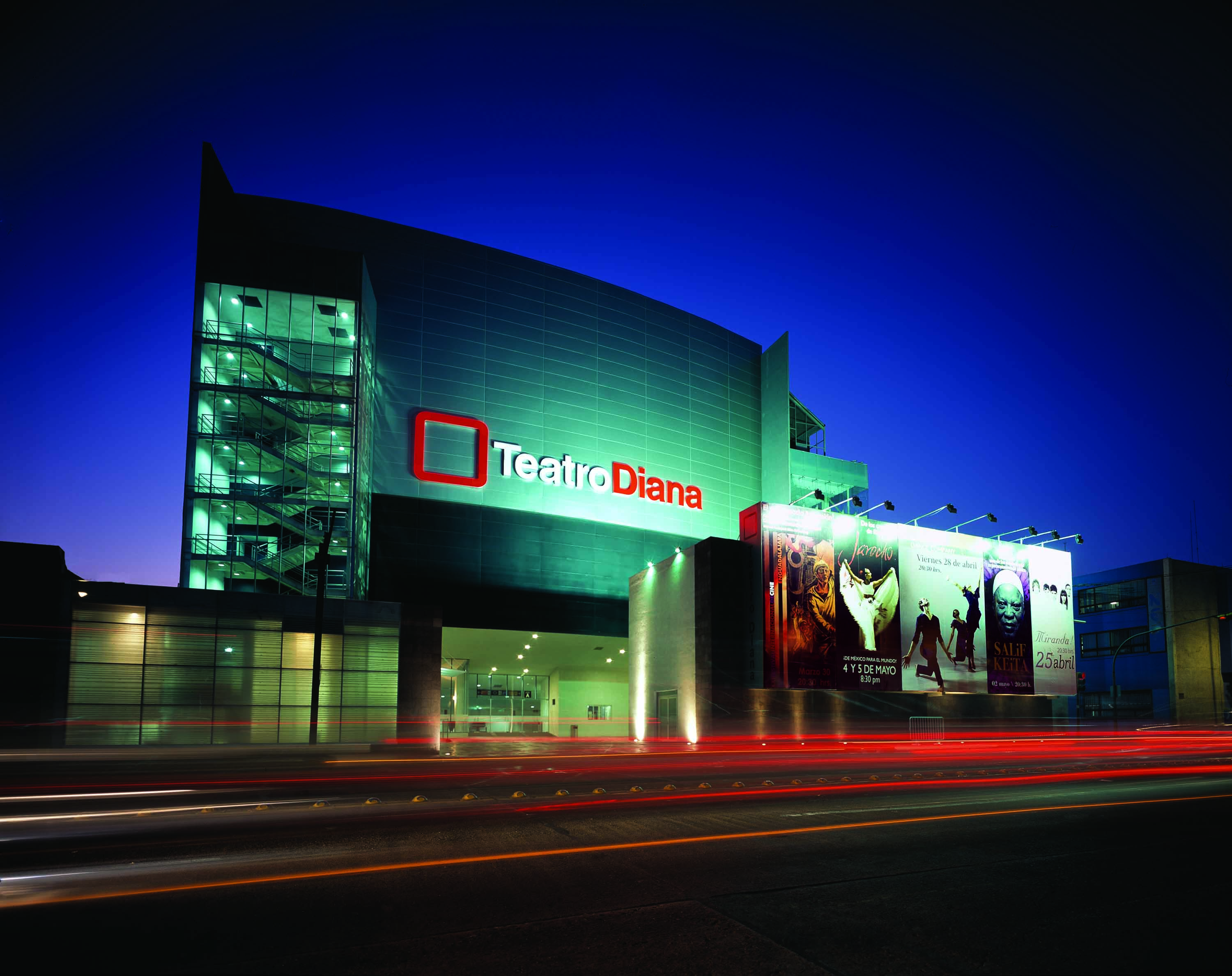
Diana Cultural Center

=== Diana Cultural Center ===
The Diana Cultural Center, which includes the Diana Theater and the Diana Studio, serves as a model for the performing arts. It operates primarily with its own financial resources, maintaining high service standards with minimal financial aid from the University of Guadalajara. The Diana Theater opened in 2005, offering 250 shows in its inaugural year. In 2014, the theater hosted a record 377 shows, the highest number in its history. After a decade of operation, the theater has made a significant impact on the "tapatíos" (residents of Guadalajara), attracting approximately 2.5 million spectators through nearly 3,000 performances.

=== Cineforo ===
The Cineforo is a space dedicated to showcasing films, serving as an alternative for film enthusiasts in Guadalajara by screening movies not typically shown in commercial cinemas. Located in the General Rectory Building of the University of Guadalajara, it was inaugurated in 1988 by Rector Javier Alfaro Anguiano. The Cineforo has a seating capacity of 440 people, and its facilities have also been used for theater, dance, and music performances. Currently, the Cineforo is the main venue for the Guadalajara International Film Festival, held annually.

=== Calle 2 ===
Since 2005, Calle 2 has functioned as a multifunctional entertainment facility. It is composed of seven pavilions, two forums, three concourses, and one arena. The venue can host fairs, exhibitions, concerts, as well as social and sports events, with a capacity of 80,000 people.

=== Cavaret Studio Theater ===
The Cavatet Studio Theater was established to meet the need for facilities in the Guadalajara Metropolitan Area that could host alternative shows of national and international renown. It serves as a space for recreation, entertainment, and the production of cultural and sports events, conventions, exhibitions, and concerts of various genres.

=== Vivian Blumenthal Theater ===
The Vivian Blumenthal Theater was established to bring classic theater productions closer to the community and to promote their widespread appreciation. This cultural space is equipped to host theater projects as well as a variety of music performances. It serves as a stimulus for artistic and cultural activities in the city, offering a platform for high-quality shows that involve local, national, and international productions. The theater is considered a significant venue for multidisciplinary arts experimentation and proposals.

=== Jalisco Experimental Theater ===
The Jalisco Experimental Theater, designed by architect Eric Coufal, was opened on 6 December 1960 and is part of the National Cultural Heritage. Built by the Jalisco State Government in the 1950s, the theater is located within the Agua Azul Park. It is owned by the Jalisco State Government and managed by the University of Guadalajara.

== University Cultural Center ==
The University Cultural Center is the first university cultural complex in the mid-west region of Mexico, currently under construction in the city of Zapopan, Jalisco. Once completed, it will house the largest and most significant cultural space in the Guadalajara Metropolitan Area, serving as the venue for thousands of cultural and academic activities.

The University Cultural Center will integrate university campuses, art schools, media facilities, thematic and archaeological parks, as well as sports and residential areas. It is also home to the Telmex Auditorium, Bicentenary Plaza, and the Juan José Arreola Public Library of the State of Jalisco. Additionally, two projects are currently under construction: the Environmental Sciences Museum and the Performing Arts Complex.

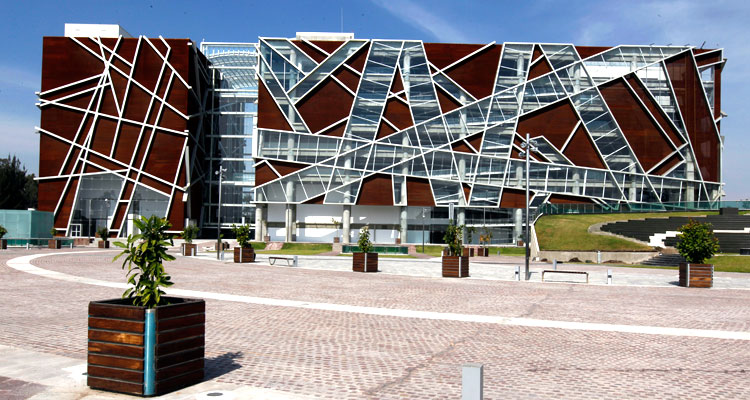
Juan José Arreola Public Library of the State of Jalisco

=== Juan José Arreola Public Library of the State of Jalisco ===
The Juan José Arreola Public Library of the State of Jalisco aims to preserve, protect, and provide free access to its extensive collection of contemporary and historical books. With the largest bibliography in the state and a vast number of historical documents (some dating back 500 years), the library is a significant space for study and research. The library has been under the administration of the University of Guadalajara since 1925. In 1975, it was relocated to a section of the Jalisco House of Culture building. In 2001, the University General Council renamed it the "Juan José Arreola" Public Library of the State of Jalisco in honor of the writer who had served as its headmaster from 1991 until his death in 2001.

In 2011, the library's collection was relocated to a new building, which serves as the entrance to the University Cultural Center. The new library building houses approximately 3 million books, representing around 500 years of history, not only from the state of Jalisco but also from northern Mexico and the southeastern United States.

=== Telmex Auditorium ===
The Telmex Auditorium was inaugurated on 1 September 2007 and is currently one of the most important performance venues in Latin America. Designed by Mexican architect José de Arimatea Moyao, the auditorium is located in the Guadalajara Metropolitan Area and is part of the University Cultural Center, the University of Guadalajara's most significant and transcendent cultural project.

=== Performing Arts Complex ===
This project, which was scheduled to open at the end of 2015, aims to promote the development of performing arts in the region. It will consist of four halls and an outdoor stage dedicated to hosting performances. The project is designed to address the need for local production and will primarily be used for theater. Its venues will accommodate a variety of events, including opera, symphonic concerts, musical theater, dance, films, visual arts, and conferences. Additionally, the spaces will be used for book presentations and other cultural events.

=== Center of Transdisciplinary Instrumentation and Services ===
This project of the University of Guadalajara, to be located at the University Cultural Center, will feature four units dedicated to microscopy, spectroscopy, molecular biology, proteomics, and bioinformatics. These units will enable the classification of biological, medical, industrial, and environmental samples. The objective of the center is to enhance the research efforts of approximately 400 researchers across the university's various campuses.

=== Environmental Sciences Museum ===
The Environmental Sciences Museum will be the first of its kind in Mexico, dedicated to showcasing the natural and social environments of the region, the nation, and the continent. Its aim is to present topics related to the environment, nature, culture, and the sustainability of life on Earth in an engaging manner. The museum will be closely linked to the regional identity of Jalisco which, along with Guadalajara, encompasses a design based on five sustainability pillars: ecology, economy, politics, culture, and society. Additionally, it will address contemporary issues concerning sustainability in the Guadalajara Metropolitan Area.

== University System of Radio, Television, and Cinematography ==
=== Channel 44 ===
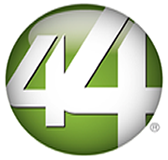
Logo

Channel 44 UDGTV is a project of the University of Guadalajara that began broadcasting in 2011, following two decades of efforts to establish its own TV channel. The channel has a cultural mission, aiming to broadcast programs across the four municipalities that make up the Guadalajara Metropolitan Area. These programmes include musical, cultural, and informational content.

=== University of Guadalajara Radio Network ===
The University of Guadalajara Radio Network is a project composed of eight radio stations that cover the mid-west region of Mexico. Its aim is to serve as a bridge between the university and the community. The network is a cultural radio platform that supports cultural movements, local indie artists, and social and cultural diversity. The radio stations that make up the University of Guadalajara Radio Network are:

- Guadalajara: XHUG 104.3 FM
- Lagos de Moreno: XHUGL 104.7 FM
- Autlán: XHAUT 102.3 FM
- Ciudad Guzmán: XHUGG 94.3 FM
- Ocotlán: XHUGO 107.9 FM
- Colotlán: XHUGC 104.7 FM
- Puerto Vallarta: XHUGP 104.3 FM
- Ameca: XHUGA 105.5 FM

== Collaboration with the Guadalajara Civil Hospital ==
The Guadalajara Civil Hospital is a health institution located in Guadalajara, Jalisco, since the 17th century. It was founded in 1794 by Guadalajara's Bishop, Fray Antonio Alcalde y Barriga, as a partner institution of the University of Guadalajara. Since its founding, the hospital has served as the university's hospital school, where students and academics from the health divisions conduct professional practices and research, respectively.

Currently, the Civil Hospital, which has been a decentralized body of the Jalisco State Government since 1997, operates two hospital units: the Friar Antonio Alcalde Hospital and the Dr. Juan I. Menchaca Hospital. These units serve 29% of the population of Jalisco. The hospital's original building was the San Miguel de Belén Hospital, which was later renamed and is now known as the Friar Antonio Alcalde Old Civil Hospital.

== University of Guadalajara in Los Angeles (UDGLA) ==
The University of Guadalajara extends its reach beyond borders to offer academic opportunities to Mexicans living in Los Angeles, while simultaneously fostering connections with their Latin American roots. UDGLA works to improve the quality of life and social integration of co-national migrants and Hispanics by enhancing their cultural knowledge and education through various cultural and academic projects.

=== Los Angeles Spanish-Language Book Fair (LéaLA) ===
LéaLA is an event aimed at promoting Spanish-language books and recognizing the Latin American population, its culture, and customs. It is an initiative supported by the University of Guadalajara in Los Angeles and the Guadalajara International Book Fair. The event features presentations of Spanish-language books, conferences on the culture and historical roots of Latin American countries, meetings with writers from Latin America and other regions, discussion forums on book sales and distribution challenges, and participation by Latin American celebrities in various cultural and literary activities. These efforts aim to foster a reading culture and generate interest in the written word, particularly among children.

=== Guadalajara International Film Festival in Los Angeles ===
This festival serves as a window to the world of contemporary Mexican and Hispanic cinema and as an extension of the Guadalajara International Film Festival. The objectives of the festival are to increase access to Mexican and Hispanic films, create a bridge between the Mexican and American film industries, foster collaborations between international filmmakers, and enhance the presence of Mexican and Hispanic films in the United States.

=== Channel 31.2 in Los Angeles ===
The programmes broadcast on Channel 44 in Guadalajara are also available on Channel 31.2 in Los Angeles. The University of Guadalajara in Los Angeles aims to strengthen its connection with the university community and the Hispanic population through this channel.

== Notable alumni ==
- Alejandro Colunga, painter, sculptor
- Guillermo del Toro, Academy Award-winning film director, screenwriter, producer, and novelist
- Pedro Moreno, insurrectionist hero of the Mexico Independence
- Valentin Gomez Farias, doctor, politician, President of Mexico
- Ignacio Luis Vallarta, Jalisco State Governor, President of the Supreme Court of Justice of the Nation
- Mariano Azuela, doctor, author of The Underdogs
- Ali Chumacero, poet, editor
- Hugo Gutierrez Vega, lawyer, poet, writer, actor, teacher, diplomat
- Jose Luis Martinez Rodriguez, President of the Mexican Language Academy
- Luis Barragán, is considered as the most significant Mexican architect, awarded with the Pritzker Prize
- Fernando Gonzalez Cortazar, architect, writer, sculptor
- Jorge Matute Remus, civil engineer, Rector of the University of Guadalajara, author of movement of the "tapatia" telephone company building
- Lucia Maya, painter, sculptor
- Sandra Pascoe Ortiz, researcher and chemical engineer
- Barbara Padilla, soprano, runner-up on the fourth season of America's Got Talent
- Ximena Puente de la Mora, lawyer, academic, and researcher
- Sandra Ramírez, FIFA football assistant referee
- Cristo Fernández, Actor

== University rankings ==
Year	Latin American University Rankings	World University Rankings	Ranking Web of World Universities	AméricaEconomía Intelligence's Ranking of Mexican Universities
2015	42		683	8
2014	59	601–650		6
2013	60	601–650		
2012	50	501–550		
2011	51			

== See also ==
- List of colonial universities in Latin America
