= Universidad del Valle de Atemajac =

Private Catholic university in Zapopan, Jalisco, Mexico

Coordinates: 20.6572°N 103.4200°W

The Universidad del Valle de Atemajac (UNIVA, also known as University of the Valley of Atemajac) is a private Catholic university in Zapopan, Jalisco, Mexico, located in the Guadalajara metropolitan area. While international students are welcome, the language of instruction at UNIVA is Spanish. Ximena Navarrete, the winner of the Miss Universe 2010 competition, studied in this university.
