= List of medical schools in North America =

The following is a list of medical schools (or universities with a medical school), in North America.

== Costa Rica ==
- Universidad de Costa Rica
- Universidad de Ciencias Médicas
- Universidad Autonoma de Centro America
- Universidad Hispanoamericana
- Universidad Internacional de Las Americas
- Universidad Latina de Costa Rica
- Universidad de Iberoamerica
- Colegio Universitario San Judas Tadeo
- Escuela Autonoma de Ciencas Medicas de Centro America

== El Salvador ==
- Facultad de Ciencias de la Salud "Dr. Luis Edmundo Vasquez", Universidad Dr. José Matías Delgado
- Facultad de Medicina, Universidad de El Salvador (Public, est. 1847)
- Universidad Evangelica de El Salvador
- Universidad Nueva San Salvador
- Universidad Salvadorena Alberto Masferrer

== Guatemala ==
- Universidad de San Carlos de Guatemala
- Universidad Francisco Marroquin
- Universidad Mariano Galvez
- Universidad Rafael Landivar
- Universidad Mesoamericana Quetzaltenango

== Honduras ==
- Universidad Catolica de Honduras (UNICAH)
- Universidad Nacional Autónoma de Honduras (UNAH), Facultad de Ciencias Medicas
- Universidad Tecnologica Centroamericana (UNITEC) Facultad de Ciencias de la Salud

== Panama ==
- Escuela de Medicina, Latin University of Panama
- Escuela de Medicina, Universidad Latinoamericana de Ciencia y Tecnología
- International School of Medical Sciences
- University of Panama

== Mexico ==
- Division of Health Sciences, University of Quintana Roo
- Instituto Politecnico Nacional, CICS Milpa Alta
- Instituto Politécnico Nacional, Escuela Nacional de Medicina y Homeopatía
- Instituto Politécnico Nacional, Escuela Superior de Medicina
- Instituto Tecnologico y de Estudios Superiores de Monterrey
- Universidad Anáhuac México, Facultad de Ciencias de la Salud
- Universidad Autónoma "Benito Juárez" de Oaxaca, Facultad de Medicina
- Universidad Autónoma de Aguascalientes, Centro de Ciencias de la Salud
- Universidad Autónoma de Baja California (UABC), Facultad de Medicina
- Universidad Autónoma de Campeche, Facultad de Medicina
- Universidad Autónoma de Chiapas (UNACH), Facultad de Medicina Humana
- Universidad Autónoma de Coahuila (Unidad Torreón), Facultad de Medicina
- Universidad Autónoma de Guadalajara, Facultad de Medicina
- Universidad Autónoma de Nuevo León (UANL), Facultad de Medicina
- Universidad Autónoma de Querétaro, Facultad de Medicina
- Universidad Autónoma de San Luis Potosí, Facultad de Medicina
- Universidad Autónoma de Sinaloa, Facultad de Medicina
- Universidad Autónoma de Veracruz “Villa Rica”, Facultad de Medicina
- Universidad Autónoma de Yucatán, Facultad de Medicina
- Universidad Autonoma Metropolitana
- Universidad de Guadalajara, Facultad de Medicina
- Universidad de Guanajuato, Facultad de Medicina
- Universidad de Monterrey (UDEM)
- Universidad del Ejército y Fuerza Aérea, Escuela Médico Militar
- Universidad Anáhuac Mayab, Escuela de Medicina
- Universidad Anáhuac Querétaro, Escuela de Medicina
- Universidad Anáhuac Puebla, Escuela de Medicina
- Universidad del Valle de Mexico
- Universidad Juarez Autonoma de Tabasco
- Universidad Juarez del Estado de Durango Campus, Durango
- Universidad Juarez del Estado de Durango Campus, Gomez Palacio
- Universidad La Salle, Facultad de Medicina
- Universidad Latinoamericana, Escuela de Medicina
- Universidad México Americana del Norte A.C., Escuela de Medicina
- Universidad Michoacana de San Nicolás de Hidalgo. Facultad de Ciencias Médicas y Biológicas "Dr. Ignacio Chávez"
- Universidad Nacional Autónoma de México, Facultad de Medicina
- Universidad Nacional Autónoma de México, Facultad de Estudios Superiores Iztacala
- Universidad Nacional Autónoma de México, Facultad de Estudios Superiores Zaragoza
- Universidad Panamericana. Escuela de Medicina
- Universidad Veracruzana, Facultad de Medicina
- Universidad Westhill, Escuela de Medicina, Ciudad de Mexico
- Universidad Xochicalco, Escuela de Medicina, Ensenada
- Universidad Xochicalco, Escuela de Medicina, Mexicali
- Universidad Xochicalco, Escuela de Medicina, Tijuana
