= Consortium for North American Higher Education Collaboration =

Academic consortium

Consortium for North American Higher Education Collaboration: Consortium pour la collaboration dans l'enseignement supérieur en Amérique du Nord (French); Consorcio para la Colaboración de la Educación Superior en América del Norte (Spanish)
- Flag Emblem

- Secretariat: (United States) Tucson, Arizona
- Official languages: English; French; Spanish
- Membership: Canada; Mexico; United States

Leaders
  - Executive Director: Sean Manley-Casimir
  - President of the Board: Fernando León-García

Establishment
  - Formation: 1994
- Website http://www.conahec.org

The Consortium for North American Higher Education Collaboration (CONAHEC) (Spanish: Consorcio para la Colaboración de la Educación Superior en América del Norte, French: Consortium pour la collaboration dans l'enseignement supérieur en Amérique du Nord) is a non-profit membership organization which advises and connects higher education institutions interested in establishing or strengthening academic collaborative programs in the North American region.

Its core membership is composed by colleges and universities from Canada, the United States and Mexico. Since 2008, its membership has expanded to include participation of key higher education institutions from other countries.

CONAHEC fosters academic collaboration among higher educacion institutions and it has developed a successful partnership with the key national umbrella higher education organizations in the North American Free Trade Agreement (NAFTA) region: the American Council on Education (ACE), the American Association of Community Colleges (AACC), the Association of Universities and Colleges of Canada (AUCC), the Association of Canadian Community Colleges and the Asociación Nacional de Universidades e Instituciones de Educación Superior (ANUIES) from Mexico.

With more than 170 member institutions, today, CONAHEC is the largest and most comprehensive network of institutions from the NAFTA region, offering student exchanges, annual conferences, professional development programs, and direct advise to its members.

== History ==
CONAHEC was founded in 1994 as the U.S.-Mexico Educational Interchange Project, co-convened by the Western Interstate Commission for Higher Education and the Mexican Association for International Education (AMPEI). Later, in 1997, the organization adopted its current name and official trinational scope.

== Activities ==
CONAHEC member institutions have established a series of services, including:

- North American Student Exchange Program
- Online information services and institutional "matchmaking"
- North American Higher Education Conference
- Student Organization of North America
- Regional executive workshops
- Intensive language, culture, and higher education immersion programs
- Specialized publications
- Faculty Mobility Program

== Secretariat ==
CONAHEC is headquartered at the University of Arizona in Tucson, Arizona.

== Governance leadership ==
President of the Board of Directors	Term
Salvador Malo. Mexico	2004–2006
David A. Longanecker. US	2006–2008
David Marshall. Canada	2008–2010
Fernando León-García. Mexico	2010–2012
David A. Longanecker. US	2013–2015
David Atkinson. CANADA	2013–2018
Fernando León-Garcia. US	2018–2020

== Executive leadership ==
- 1994-2012 - Executive director: Francisco Marmolejo
- 2012-2018 - Executive director: Sean Manley-Casimir

== Member List ==
Current members include the following:

=== Canada ===
- Brock University
- Canadian Bureau for International Education
- Colleges and Institutes Canada
- Georgian College
- Langara College
- McMaster University
- Memorial University
- Mount Royal University
- Organización Universitaria Interamericana
- Selkirk College
- Universities Canada
- University of the Fraser Valley

=== Mexico ===
- Asociación Mexicana para la Educación Internacional
- Asociación Nacional de Universidades e Instituciones de Educación Superior
- Asociación Nacional de Universidades Politécnicas
- Asociación Nacional de Universidades Tecnológicas
- Benemérita Universidad Autónoma de Puebla
- Centro de Enseñanza Técnica y Superior
- Centro de Estudios Universitarios
- Consorcio de Universidades Mexicanas
- Federación de Instituciones Mexicanas Particulares de Educación Superior (FIMPES)
- Instituto de Estudios Superiores de Tamaulipas
- Instituto Tecnológico de Sonora
- Instituto Tecnológico y de Estudios Superiores de Occidente
- Universidad Anáhuac Oaxaca
- Universidad Anáhuac Cancún
- Universidad Anáhuac Mayab
- Universidad Anáhuac México
- Universidad Anáhuac Puebla
- Universidad Anáhuac Querétaro
- Universidad Anáhuac Xalapa
- Universidad Autónoma de Aguascalientes
- Universidad Autónoma de Baja California
- Universidad Autónoma de Chiapas
- Universidad Autónoma de Chihuahua
- Universidad Autónoma de Ciudad Juárez
- Universidad Autónoma de Coahuila
- Universidad Autónoma de Guadalajara
- Universidad Autónoma de Guerrero
- Universidad Autónoma de la Laguna
- Universidad Autónoma de Nuevo León
- Universidad Autónoma de Occidente
- Universidad Autónoma de San Luis Potosí
- Universidad Autónoma de Sinaloa
- Universidad Autónoma de Tamaulipas
- Universidad Autónoma del Estado de Hidalgo
- Universidad Autonoma del Estado de Mexico
- Universidad Autónoma del Noreste
- Universidad de Colima
- Universidad de Guadalajara
- Universidad de Monterrey
- Universidad de Quintana Roo
- Universidad de Sonora
- Universidad de Tijuana
- Universidad del Caribe
- Universidad del Noreste
- Universidad del Pedregal
- Universidad del Valle de Puebla, S.C.
- Universidad Estatal de Sonora
- Universidad Iberoamericana
- Universidad Kino A.C.
- Universidad La Salle
- Universidad Latina de América
- Universidad Marista de Mérida, A.C.
- Universidad Nacional Autónoma de México
- Universidad Politecnica Metropolitana de Hidalgo
- Universidad Popular Autónoma del Estado de Puebla
- Universidad Vasco de Quiroga, A.C.
- Universidad Veracruzana
- Universidad Xochicalco

=== United States ===
- American Association of Community Colleges
- American Association of State Colleges and Universities
- American Council on Education
- Association of International Education Administrators
- Border Trade Alliance
- California Colleges for International Education
- California State University, Fullerton
- Chamber of the Americas
- City University of Seattle
- Dallas County Community College District
- Dominican University of California
- Eastern New Mexico University
- Institute of International Education
- Inter American University of Puerto Rico
- Lenoir-Rhyne University
- Lyon College
- Methodist University
- Network of International Education Associations
- New Mexico State University
- Scholars at Risk
- Texas A&M International University
- The Forum on Education Abroad
- University of Arizona
- University of Missouri
- University of San Diego
- University of Texas at El Paso
- Wayne State University
- West Virginia University
- Western Interstate Commission for Higher Education
- Western New Mexico University

=== Affiliate Members ===
Argentina

- Universidad Nacional de Quilmes
- Universidad Nacional del Nordeste

Bolivia

- Universidad Católica Boliviana - San Pablo
- Universidad del Valle, Bolivia

Brazil

- Universidade Estadual Paulista Júlio de Mesquita Filho (UNESP)
- Universidade Federal do Paraná

Chile

- Universidad de Santiago de Chile
- Universidad San Sebastián

Colombia

- Escuela Tecnologica Instituto Tecnico Central
- Fundación Universitaria Navarra (UniNavarra)
- Pontificia Universidad Javeriana
- Universidad del Norte
- Universidad Simón Bolívar

Dominican Republic

- Instituto Tecnológico de Santo Domingo

Ecuador

- Universidad ECOTEC
- Universidad Técnica Particular de Loja

Germany

- University of Potsdam

Jamaica

- Association of Caribbean Universities and Research Institutes

Korea

- Asia-Pacific Association for International Education
- Hankuk University of Foreign Studies
- Hanyang University

Peru

- Universidad Peruana de Ciencias Aplicadas

Spain

- Compostela Group of Universities
- Universidad de Oviedo
- Universidad del País Vasco

Taiwan

- Taiwan MingDao University

United Kingdom

- University for the Creative Arts

== See also ==
- International education
- Western Interstate Commission for Higher Education
