= AMPEI =

Mexican nonprofit membership organization

- Abbreviation: AMPEI
- Formation: 1992; 34 years ago
- Headquarters: Monterrey, Mexico
- Members: International educators from Mexican universities
- President: América M. Lizárraga González
- Website: www.ampei.org.mx

The Mexican Association for International Education (AMPEI) Spanish: Asociación Mexicana para la Educación Internacional [AMPEI], is a Mexican nonprofit membership organization, which brings together international educators from Mexican higher education institutions.

Its core membership is composed by individuals in charge of the different international education activities in colleges and universities from Mexico, and elsewhere.

AMPEI has developed a collaborative work with related organizations from other parts of the world, such as NAFSA, CONAHEC, CBIE, and EAIE.

AMPEI also works actively with the different Embassies in Mexico, as well as government agencies and foundations, engaged in supporting international education and academic exchanges in higher education.

== History ==
AMPEI was founded in 1992 in a meeting in which Sylvia Ortega-Salazar was elected as its first President.

Later, the leadership of the organization has been presided by:

- Jocelyne Gacel-Avila, Universidad de Guadalajara
- Ofelia Cervantes, Universidad de las Americas
- Martín Pantoja, Universidad de Guanajuato
- Antonio Osuna, Universidad Panamericana- Guadalajara
- Norma Juárez, Universidad Autonoma del Estado de Morelos
- Thomas Buntru, Universidad de Monterrey
- Alicia Cabrero, Universidad Autónoma de San Luis Potosí

In addition, AMPEI has an External Advisory Board which has been presided by:

- Julio Rubio-Oca, then Understecretary for Higher Education, Mexico
- Francisco Marmolejo, Executive Director of CONAHEC.
- Antonio Osuna, Universidad Panamericana.

== Leadership ==
The current President is América M. Lizárraga González, from Universidad Autónoma de Sinaloa.

== Activities ==
AMPEI conducts a series of activities, including:

- Conducting professional development of individuals involved in international education and academic exchanges in Mexican colleges and universities
- Promoting academic exchanges and collaboration among higher education institutions in Mexico and abroad
- Research and analysis of management processes in international education
- Dissemination of relevant information
- Recommending policies and practices aimed at fostering the development of international education in Mexico
- Hosting conferences

== See also ==
- International education
