= Yolanda González =

Yolanda González may be:

- Yolanda González (artist), (born 1963)
- Yolanda González (activist), (born 1961)
- Yolanda González Hernández, (born 1956)
