= Mario García Valdez =

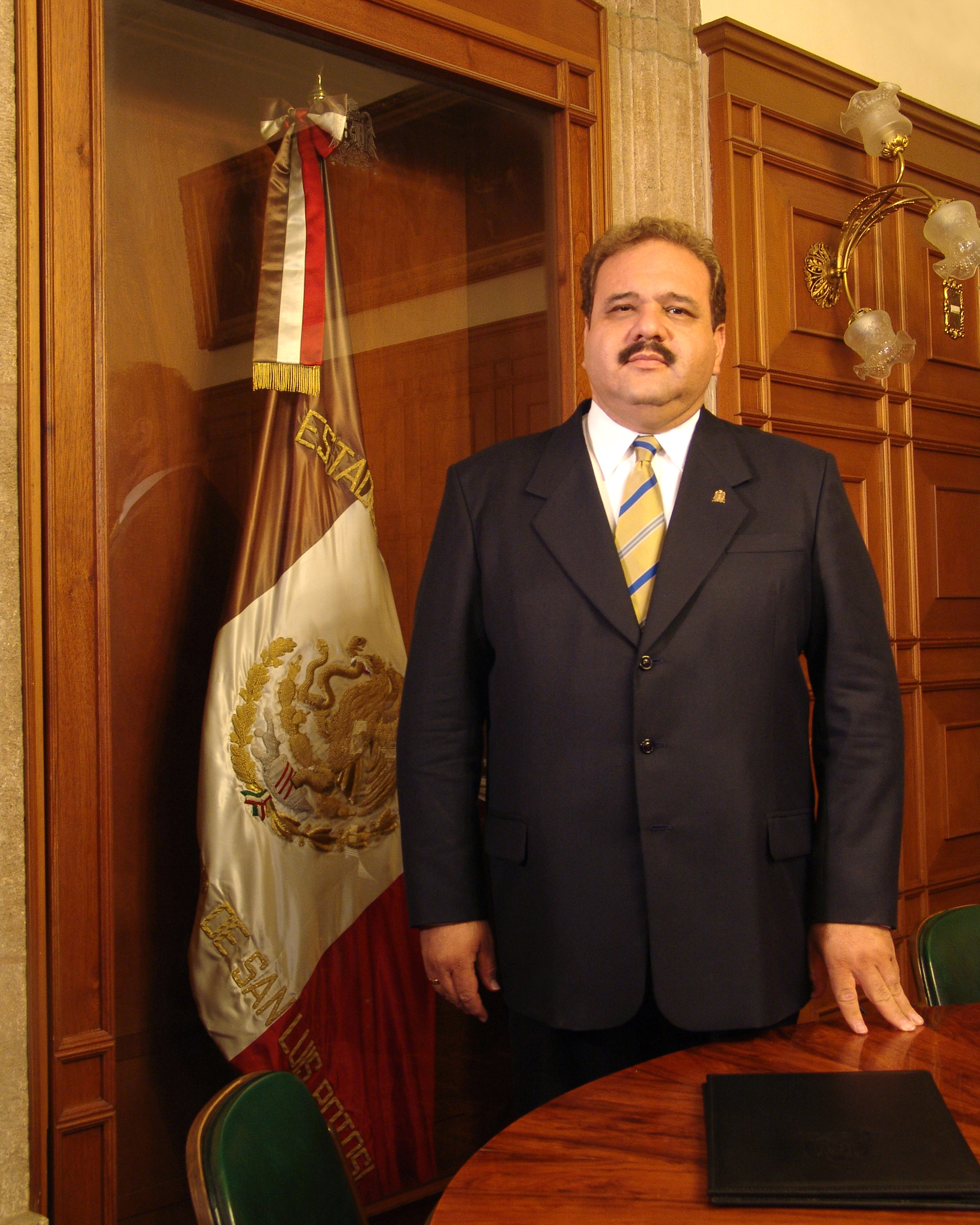

Mayor at City Hall of San Luis Potosí, Mexico
- In office 2012–2015

President of Autonomous University of San Luis Potosí UASLP
- In office April, 2004 – April 2012
- Preceded by: Jaime Valle Méndez

Personal details
- Born: 1963 (age 62–63) Tamuín, S.L.P., Mexico
- Education: UASLP
- Profession: Professor of Law
- Website: http://sanluis.gob.mx/ayuntamiento/presidente-muncipal/

Mario García Valdez is the Director of the National College of Technical Education (CONALEP) in the State of San Luis Potosi. During 2012–15, he served as Mayor of the City of San Luis Potosí San Luis Potosí, Mexico. Previously, he served as President of the Autonomous University of San Luis Potosí (UASLP) from 2004 to 2012. A lawyer, Mr. García has been a faculty member of UASLP since 1987. At UASLP he has served in various positions including Admissions Director, Vice President for Student Services, Legal Advisor to the Rector, and General Secretary of the university.

During his tenure, UASLP was awarded the Presidential recognition for the highest percentage of students enrolled in academic programs that are peer-reviewed as being of good quality. UASLP also received the National Recognition for Institutional Development awarded by the Mexican Ministry of Education (SEP) and the National Association of Universities (ANUIES for its acronym in Spanish).

During 2006–2008, Garcia was President of the Mexican Consortium of Universities (CUMex), a selective network of the most important higher education institutions in Mexico with sound research infrastructure and high quality academic programs.

Also he served as President of the North Eastern Region Chapter of ANUIES which includes the 27 most important higher education institutions from the states of Coahuila, Durango, Nuevo León, San Luis Potosí, Tamaulipas and Zacatecas.

Preceded by Jaime Valle Méndez	President of the Autonomous University of San Luis Potosí (UASLP); 2004-2012	Succeeded by
