= Francisco Marmolejo =

Mexican academic

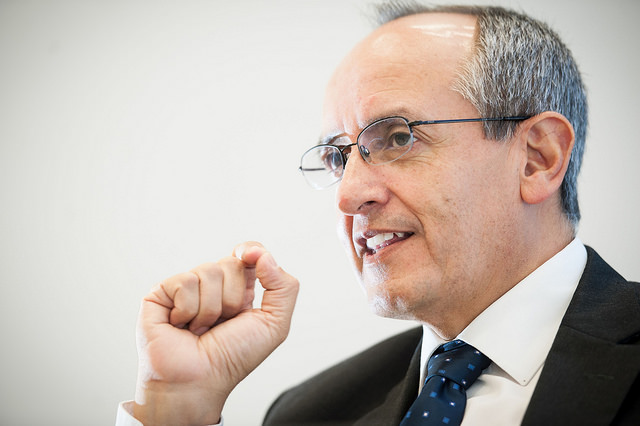
- Born: 1961 (age 64–65)
- Education: Universidad Autónoma de San Luis Potosí
- Occupation: International educator
- Known for: Higher Education President, Qatar Foundation
- Spouse: Olivia G. Cossio

Francisco Marmolejo (born 1961) is an international educational administrator. Currently, he is the President of Higher Education at the Qatar Foundation for Education, Science and Community Development, based in Doha, Qatar. From 2012 to 2020, he served as Lead Tertiary Education Specialist of the World Bank. At this institution, he served as Global Coordinator of Tertiary Education from 2012 to 2018, and, from 2016 to 2020 as Lead Education Specialist for India and Asia, based in Delhi, India.

== Early life and education ==
Francisco Marmolejo was born in Ojuelos in Mexico. He graduated from the Autonomous University of San Luis Potosí Universidad Autónoma de San Luis Potosí (UASLP) in 1981 with a bachelor's degree in business administration with emphasis in Agri-business. He received a master's degree in business administration from UASLP, and later conducted doctoral work in Organizational Administration at Universidad Nacional Autónoma de México.

== Career in university administration and international education ==
Marmolejo started his career at UASLP; from 1981 to 1983, he served as Manager of the Experimental Agriculture Station "Las Delicias", and from 1983 to 1987 he worked as Assistant Administrative Dean at the School of Agriculture. In 1989, he was appointed Head of the MBA Program at the Universidad de las Américas (UDLA) in Mexico City, where later he served as vice president for Academic Programs (1990–92) and Vice President for Administration and Finances (1992–94). During his tenure, UDLA obtained accreditation in the United States granted by the Southern Association of Colleges and Schools (SACS).

From 1994 to 1995, he was the first Mexican educator serving as a Fellow of the American Council on Education. He did his fellowship at the University of Massachusetts Amherst, Amherst.

At the end of his ACE Fellowship, he was appointed as founding executive director of CONAHEC, the Consortium for North American Higher Education Collaboration, a network of more than 160 colleges and universities from Canada, the U.S. and Mexico where he served until 2012. CONAHEC is the largest and an influential international collaborative higher education network in the North American Free Trade Agreement (NAFTA) region. CONAHEC is headquartered at the University of Arizona, where Marmolejo also served as Assistant Vice President for Western Hemispheric Programs, Affiliated Researcher at the Center for the Study of Higher Education and Affiliate Faculty at the Center for Latin American Studies.

Marmolejo is or has been member of advisory and governing boards in various institutions and organizations including the External Advisory Boards at the University of Nuevo Leon (UANL), the University of San Luis Potosí (UASLP), Universidad de Guadalajara, the Mexican Consortium of Universities (CUMEX), the Mexican Association of International Education (AMPEI), WES: World Education Services, and the Compostela Group of Universities. He has been member of the Commission of International Initiatives at the American Council on Education, and of the board of directors at NAFSA: Association of International Educators.

Marmolejo has consulted for universities and governments in different parts of the world and has been part of Organisation for Economic Co-operation and Development (OECD) and World Bank international peer review teams of experts conducting evaluations of higher education in Europe, Latin America, Africa, the Middle East and Asia.

He participates in international higher education conferences delivering presentations and lectures on the internationalization of higher education and higher education trends. Marmolejo has authored and co-authored articles on the same topics and chapters in books.

He was actively involved in the creation of the Network of International Education Associations (NIEA) which brings together the leaders of the most important international education associations of the world. At NIEA he served as a member of the board.

In 2014, the University of San Luis Potosí UASLP awarded him the Honorary Doctorate Degree for his contribution to international education. Also, the Universidad de Guadalajara conferred him an Honorary Doctorate Degree in 2017, and NAFSA named him Senior InternationaL Education Fellow in 2018.

Francisco Marmolejo is married to Olivia G. Cossio. They have three sons, Francisco Jr., Jose, and Juan.
