= Alfonso Lastras Ramírez =

Mexican lawyer and politician

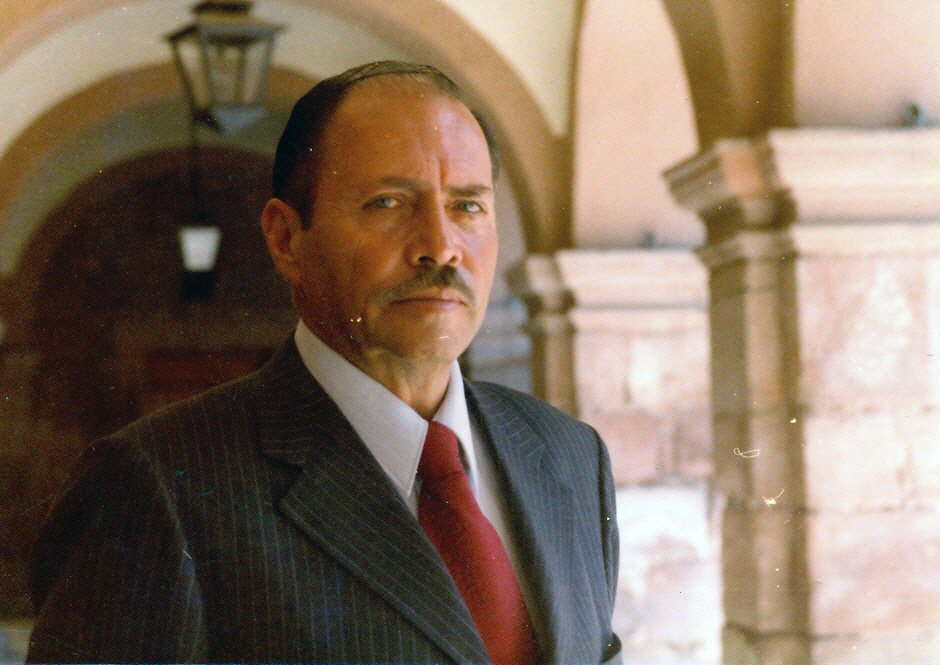

President of UASLP
- In office 1986 – January 1995
- Preceded by: José de Jesús Rodríguez Martínez
- Succeeded by: Jaime Valle Méndez

Personal details
- Born: 30 November 1924 San Luis Potosí, Mexico
- Died: 25 December 1999 (aged 75) San Luis Potosí, Mexico
- Education: UASLP
- Profession: Lawyer, Politician

Alfonso Lastras Ramírez (Note: In this name that follows Hispanic American naming customs, the first or paternal surname is Lastras and the second or maternal family name is Ramírez.) (November 30, 1924 – December 25, 1999) was a Mexican lawyer and politician. He was born in the city of San Luis Potosí to a Spanish father and Mexican mother.

His elementary studies were made at the Instituto Potosino. During the course of these studies he was invited by the maristas to study in France. He accepted their offer but at the outbreak of World War II decided to return to Mexico in the Orinoco Ship.

His middle and high school studies were done at the Universidad Autónoma de San Luis Potosí (UASLP), where he became the president of the Student Association. Afterwards he joined the Law School of the university where he also served as the president of the Federacion Universitaria Potosina. He received his bachelor's degree in law on April 7, 1952. He was an Agente del Ministerio Publico (court prosecutor) and secretary of the criminal section of the District Court. He joined the faculty of the Law, Economics and Commerce School of the UASLP. In politics, he was a member of San Luis Potosí's state congress for the XLIX Legislatura, and served as a consultant to the state government. Roberto Leyva Torres, then rector of the UASLP (equivalent to the president of a university) recalled him to become the Auxiliary Secretary of the Rectoria of the UASLP.

Lastras Ramírez returned to politics as a member of the federal Chamber of Deputies for the 53rd Congress, representing San Luis Potosí's 6th congressional district. Then he was head of the legal department of the UASLP. He received the title of Faculty Emeritus. He was Procurador de Justicia (Attorney General) and then General Government Secretary for the state of San Luis Potosí under governor Antonio Rocha Cordero.

On September 20, 1986, he was elected rector of the UASLP to replace José de Jesús Rodríguez Martínez, a position in which he served until January 4, 1995.

Preceded by José de Jesús Rodríguez Martínez	President of the Autonomous University of San Luis Potosí (UASLP); 1986-1995	Succeeded by Jaime Valle Méndez
