= Ana Luz Juárez Alejo =

Mexican lawyer and politician

- Born: San Luis Potosí, Mexico
- Occupations: Lawyer and politician
- Political party: PAN

Ana Luz Juárez Alejo is a Mexican lawyer and politician affiliated with the National Action Party (PAN). In 2005–2006 she served in the Chamber of Deputies during the 59th Congress representing San Luis Potosí's 6th district as the alternate of Francisco Xavier Salazar Diez.
