= Jaime Mendez =

Jaime Mendez may refer to:

- Jaime Mendez (American football) (born 1971), Puerto Rican collegiate football free safety
- Jaime Hernández Méndez (born 1933), Guatemalan politician and brigadier General
- Jaime Prieto Mendez (born 1950s), Colombian human rights activist
- Jaime Valle Méndez, Mexican professor of engineering
