= 6th federal electoral district of San Luis Potosí =

Federal electoral district of Mexico

San Luis Potosí's 6th
- Electoral district of the Chamber of Deputies of Mexico

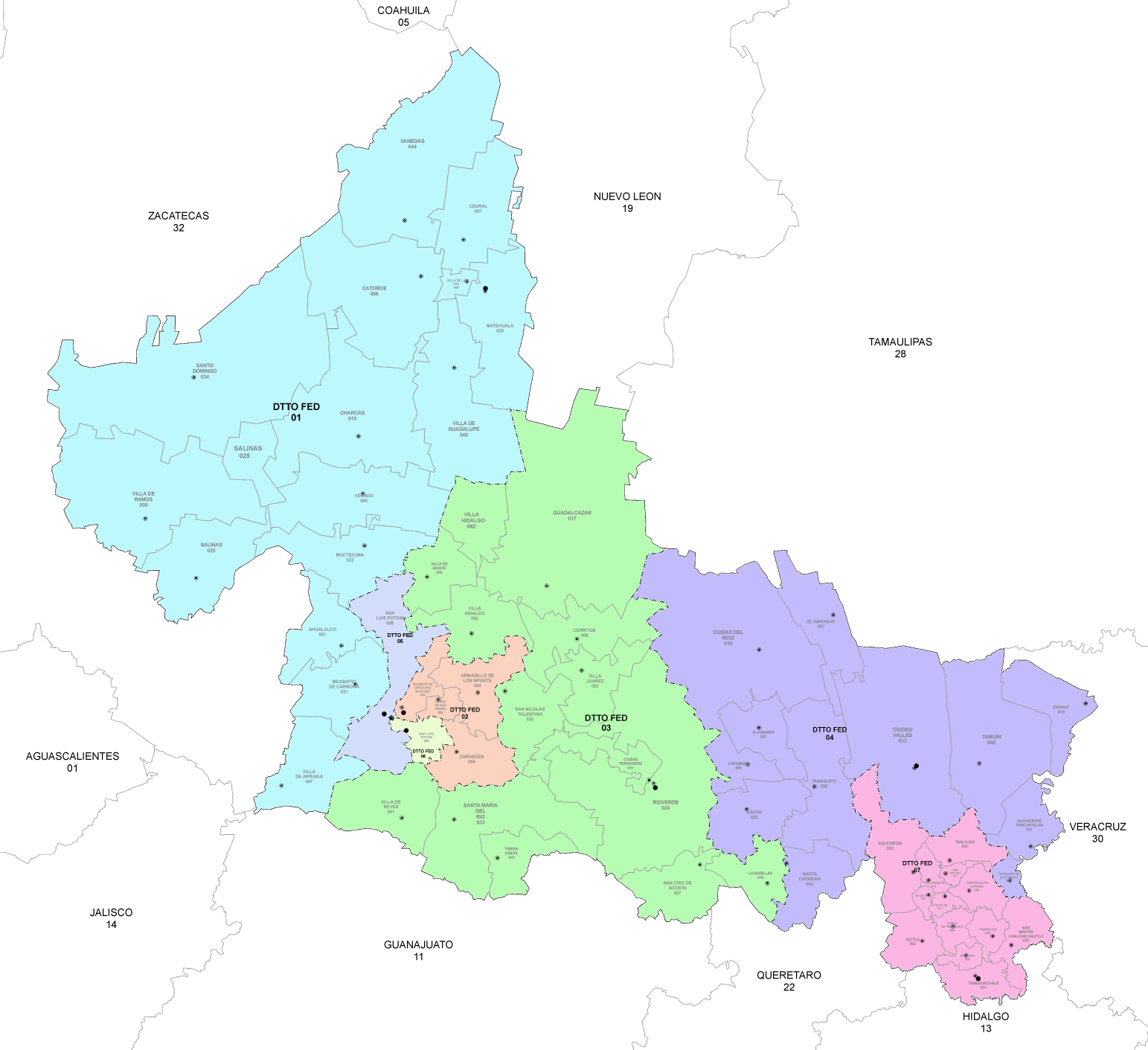
- 6th district since 2023

Incumbent
- Member: Juan Carlos Valladares
- Party: ▌Ecologist Green Party
- Congress: 66th (2024–2027)

District
- State: San Luis Potosí
- Head town: City of San Luis Potosí
- Coordinates: 22°10′N 101°00′W
- Covers: Municipality of San Luis Potosí (part)
- PR region: Second
- Precincts: 179
- Population: 452,418 (2020 census)

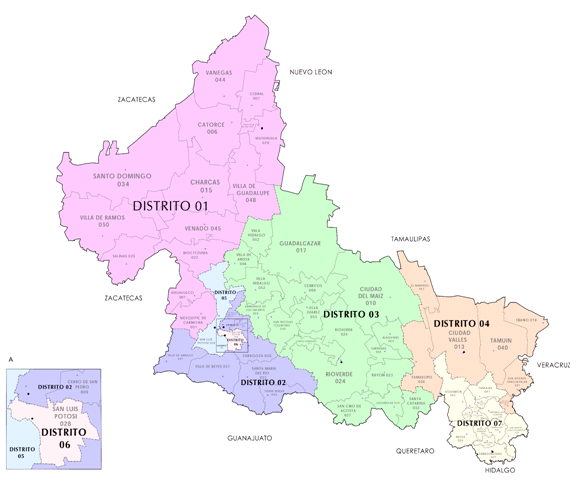
San Luis Potosí under the 2017–2022 scheme

The 6th federal electoral district of San Luis Potosí (Spanish: Distrito electoral federal 06 de San Luis Potosí) is one of the 300 electoral districts into which Mexico is divided for elections to the federal Chamber of Deputies and one of seven such districts in the state of San Luis Potosí.

It elects one deputy to the lower house of Congress for each three-year legislative session by means of the first-past-the-post system. Votes cast in the district also count towards the calculation of proportional representation ("plurinominal") deputies elected from the second region.

Suspended in 1952, (Note: The members' register for the 41st Congress (1949–1952) reports a 6th district in San Luis Potosí, but the one for the 42nd Congress (1952–1955) does not.) the 6th district was re-established as part of the 1977 electoral reforms, which increased the number of single-member seats in the Chamber of Deputies from 196 to 300. Under that plan, San Luis Potosí's seat allocation rose from five to seven. The two new districts were first contested in the 1979 legislative election.

The current member for the district, elected in the 2024 general election, is Juan Carlos Valladares Eichelmann of the Ecologist Green Party of Mexico (PVEM).

== District territory ==
Under the 2023 districting plan adopted by the National Electoral Institute (INE), which is to be used for the 2024, 2027 and 2030 federal elections, the 6th district comprises 179 electoral precincts (secciones electorales) in the south-eastern portion of the municipality of San Luis Potosí, including most of its urban core. (Note: The 5th district covers the remainder of the municipality.)

The city of San Luis Potosí, the state capital, serves as the district's head town (cabecera distrital), where results from individual polling stations are gathered together and tallied. The district reported a population of 452,418 in the 2020 census.

== Previous districting schemes ==
Evolution of electoral district numbers
	1974	1978	1996	2005	2017	2023
San Luis Potosí	5	7	7	7	7	7
Chamber of Deputies	196	300				

2017–2022

Between 2017 and 2022, the district comprised 175 precincts in the south-east of the municipality of San Luis Potosí.

2005–2017

Under the 2005 districting plan, the district covered 157 precincts in south-east of the municipality of San Luis Potosí.

1996–2005

From 1996 to 2005, the district covered the south of the municipality of San Luis Potosí, including the southern portion of the state capital.

1978–1996

The districting scheme in force from 1978 to 1996 was the result of the 1977 electoral reforms, which increased the number of single-member seats in the Chamber of Deputies from 196 to 300. Under that plan, San Luis Potosí's seat allocation rose from five to seven. The re-established sixth district's head town was at the city of San Luis Potosí and it covered a part of the city, the rural portion of its municipality, and the municipalities of Ahualulco, Moctezuma and Soledad Diez Gutiérrez.

== Deputies returned to Congress ==
(Mexico) National parties
- Current
- PAN
- PRI
- PT
- PVEM
- MC
- Morena
- PAZ
- Somos
- Defunct or local only
- PLM
- PNR
- PRM
- PNM
- PP
- PPS
- PARM
- PFCRN
- CON
- PANAL
- PSD
- PES
- PES
- PRD

San Luis Potosí's 6th district
Election	Deputy	Party	Term	Legislature
1916	Gregorio A. Tello		1916–1917	Constituent Congress of Querétaro
...
1979	Guillermo Medina de los Santos	Institutional Revolutionary Party	1979–1982	51st Congress
1982	Leopoldino Ortiz Santos	Institutional Revolutionary Party	1982–1985	52nd Congress
1985	Alfonso Lastras Ramírez	Institutional Revolutionary Party	1985–1988	53rd Congress
1988	Gonzalo Martínez Corbalá	Institutional Revolutionary Party	1988–1991	54th Congress
1991	Horacio Sánchez Unzueta	Institutional Revolutionary Party	1991–1994	55th Congress
1994	Yolanda Eugenia González Hernández	Institutional Revolutionary Party	1994–1997	56th Congress
1997	Francisco Xavier Salazar Diez	National Action Party (Mexico)	1997–2000	57th Congress
2000	Pedro Pablo Cepeda Sierra	National Action Party (Mexico)	2000–2003	58th Congress
2003	Francisco Xavier Salazar Diez (Note: Salazar Diez resigned his seat on 13 December 2005 and was replaced for the remainder of his term by his alternate, Juárez Alejo.); Ana Luz Juárez Alejo	National Action Party (Mexico)	2003–2005; 2005–2006	59th Congress
2006	Silvia Emilia Degante Romero	National Action Party (Mexico)	2006–2009	60th Congress
2009	Juan Pablo Escobar Martínez	National Action Party (Mexico)	2009–2012	61st Congress
2012	Felipe de Jesús Almaguer Torres	National Action Party (Mexico)	2012–2015	62nd Congress
2015	Xavier Nava Palacios (Note: Nava Palacios resigned his seat on 23 March 2018 and was replaced for the remainder of his by term by his alternate, Camacho Díaz.); José Carlos Camacho Díaz	Party of the Democratic Revolution	2015–2018; 2018	63rd Congress
2018	María Guadalupe Almaguer Pardo	Party of the Democratic Revolution	2018–2021	64th Congress
2021	Gilberto Hernández Villafuerte	Ecologist Green Party of Mexico	2021–2024	65th Congress
2024	Juan Carlos Valladares Eichelmann	Ecologist Green Party of Mexico	2024–2027	66th Congress

== Presidential elections ==
San Luis Potosí's 6th district
Election	District won by	Party or coalition	%
2018	Andrés Manuel López Obrador	Juntos Haremos Historia	47.5279
2024	Claudia Sheinbaum Pardo	Sigamos Haciendo Historia	55.7434
