= Radio Universidad =

Radio Universidad may refer to:

- Radio Universidad (Chihuahua), with frequencies XHRU-FM 105.3 FM and XHERU-FM 106.9 FM
- Radio Universidad (Yucatán), with frequencies XERUY-AM 1120 and XHRUY-FM 103.9 in Mérida, and XHMIN-FM 94.5 in Tizimín

== See also ==
- Radio Universidad Autónoma de Guerrero
- Radio Universidade de Coimbra
