= Pedro Pablo Cepeda Sierra =

Mexican politician

- Born: 29 June 1966 (age 59); San Luis Potosí, Mexico
- Education: UASLP
- Occupation: Politician
- Political party: PAN

Pedro Pablo Cepeda Sierra (born 29 June 1966) is a Mexican politician from the National Action Party (PAN). In the 2000 general election he was elected to the Chamber of Deputies to represent San Luis Potosí's 6th district during the 58th session of Congress, and he previously served in the Congress of San Luis Potosí.
