= Lilia Isabel Gutiérrez Burciaga =

Mexican politician

Lilia Isabel Gutiérrez Burciaga (Ramos Arizpe, Coahuila; July 6, 1968) is a Mexican politician. She is a member of the Institutional Revolutionary Party (PRI). She served as a federal deputy in 2012. In 2014 she became a local deputy of the Congress of the State of Coahuila, the first woman and public official in the country to win consecutive re-election.

== Early life ==
Lilia Gutiérrez Burciaga has a degree in psychology from the Universidad Autónoma del Noreste.

== Career ==
She became a municipal political advisor of PRI in Ramos Arizpe in 2000. She was a trustee of the Ramos Arizpe City Council during the 2010-2013 period. She became a delegate in Coahuila of the ISSSTE in January 2013, resigning in February 2014. She become a candidate for local deputy for her party in the V electoral District. She won and served as local deputy for the LX Legislature from 2014 to 2017.

In 2017, Lilia Gutiérrez Burciaga was re-elected, now for the XII Electoral District, to be part of the LXI Legislature for 2018 - 2020.
