= Division of Health Sciences of the University of Quintana Roo =

Academic unit in Mexico

- División de Ciencias de la Salud de la Universidad de Quintana Roo (Spanish); Naajil Xook T'saak ti' le Noj Naajil Xook ti' Quintana Roo (Yucatec Maya)
- Other name: "La DCS" (nickname in Spanish)
- Motto: Salus Publica, Salus Mea
- Motto in English: "The health of the people, the health of all"
- Type: Public
- Established: 23 October 2010
- Affiliations: University of Quintana Roo
- Endowment: US$7,169,000
- Director: Carlos Mariano Baeza Estrella, M.D.
- Technical Secretariat of Teaching: Luisa María Higareda Laguna, M.S.
- Academic staff: 140 professors
- Students: 1,070
- Undergraduates: 900
- Postgraduates: 170
- Location: Chetumal, Quintana Roo, Mexico; 18.52404°N 88.31299°W
- Campus: Suburban
- Language: Spanish, English and Yucatec Maya
- Colours: Gold and green
- Website: dcs.uqroo.mx

The Division of Health Sciences of the University of Quintana Roo (Spanish: División de Ciencias de la Salud de la Universidad de Quintana Roo, DCS-UQROO) is an academic division located 3.8 miles (6.2 kilometers) away from the main academic unit in Chetumal, Mexico, which houses the careers of Medicine, Nursing, and Pharmacy. It is the only academic division that simultaneously integrates three bachelor's degree programs in the study of health sciences in the Southeast region of Mexico. Due to its geographical proximity to other countries, it has a significant student population from Belize, Central and South America.

Along with the Meritorious Autonomous University of Puebla (Faculty of Chemical Sciences), the Autonomous University of Hidalgo State (Institute of Health Sciences), the Autonomous University of Morelos State (Faculty of Pharmacy), National Autonomous University of Mexico (FES Cuautitlan), and the University of the Americas Puebla (School of Sciences) is one of the only six public institutions of higher education that provide the Bachelor of Pharmacy in Mexico, also making it the only institution in house it in the region of the Yucatan Peninsula.

The institution is affiliated to ANUIES, CUMEX, and is a candidate member for AMFEM.

== History ==
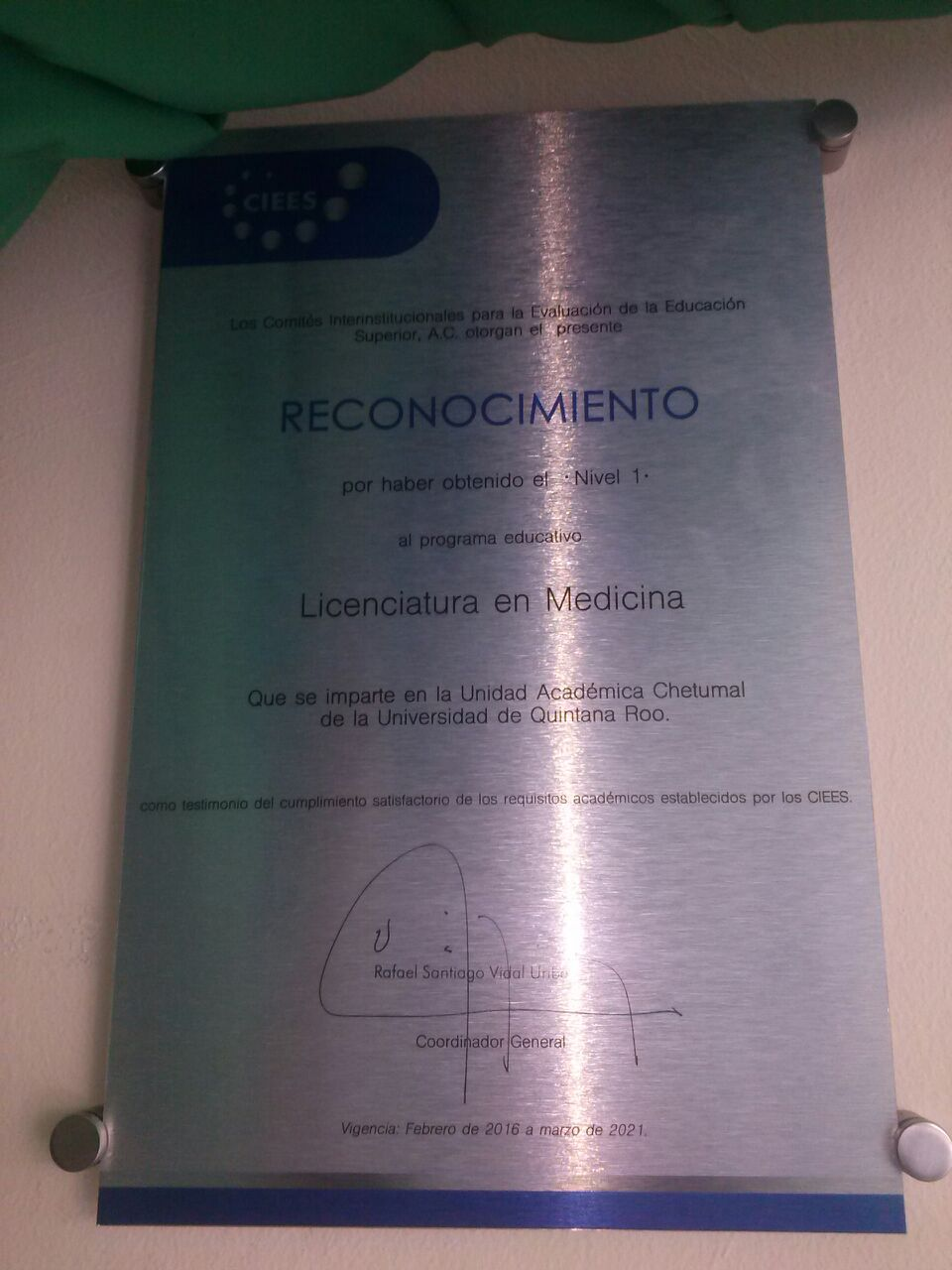
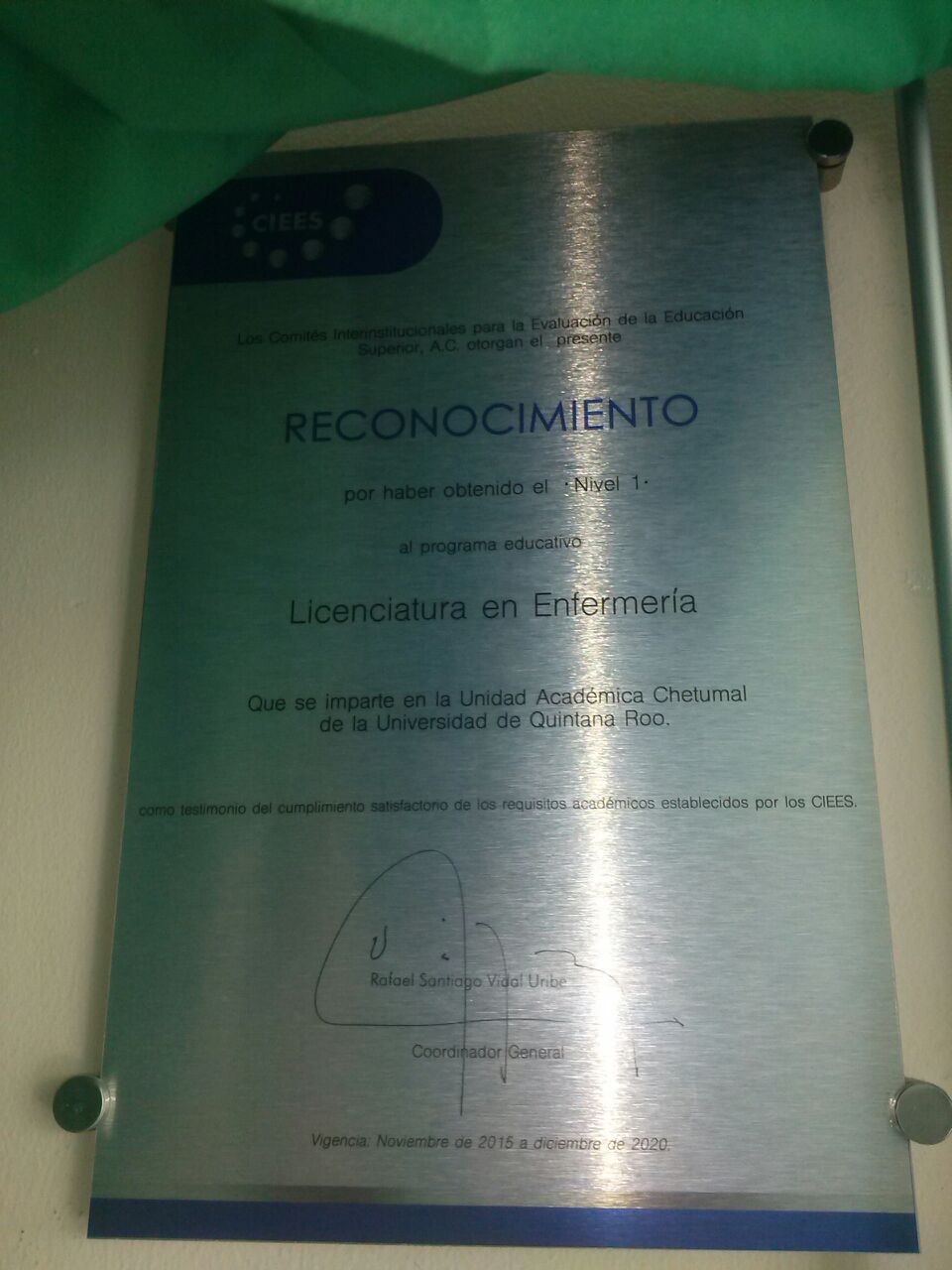
Commemorative plaques of Level 1 accreditation granted to the careers of Medicine and Nursing of the DCS-UQROO by the Inter-institutional Committees for Evaluation in Higher Education, Civil association (CIEES).

In 2006, there were plans to establish a Division of Health Sciences at the University of Quintana Roo. In 2007, the Government of the State of Quintana Roo proposed the creation of the academic division at the University.

In May 2008, the Curriculum Design Committee was established. In November 2008, the University Council authorized the creation of the DCS-UQROO, the budget and the academic offer with the three bachelor's degree programs.

The first generation of students from the three bachelor's programs of the DCS-UQROO began their first lectures on 31 August 2009 in the academic campus of Chetumal; it consisted of 97 medical students, 38 nursing students, and 26 pharmacy students. However, the DCS-UQROO's new building (where all administrative staff, academics and students were subsequently transferred) was formally opened on Saturday 23 October 2010. In December 2010, the opening of the medical specialties in conjunction with the IMSS, was authorized.

In its beginnings, the division received negative reviews because of the lack of cadaveric models and morgue for the teaching of anatomy classes and instead using medical simulation models, however, in December 2012, the first laparoscopic intervention (cholecystectomy) in a pig was performed in DCS-UQROO's campus.

In September 2013, the openings of other careers in the future in a division of health based in Cancun were announced: Biomedical engineering, Bioinformatics engineering, and Genomics engineering.

In October 2014, the first generation of the Bachelor of Science in Nursing saw three graduates complete their degrees.

In January 2015, an agreement of professionalization that will allow graduates of DCS-UQROO can apply for a residency program at the Regional Hospital of High Specialty of the Yucatan Peninsula was signed by the Government of the State of Quintana Roo, the University of Quintana Roo among other institutions of the Secretariat of Health.

In late 2015 and early 2016, the careers of Medicine and Nursing, obtained Level 1 accreditation granted by the Inter-institutional Committees for Evaluation in Higher Education (CIEES).

=== Academic directors ===
Academic director	Period
Francisco Montes de Oca Garro, M.D.	2009–2014
Carlos Mariano Baeza Estrella, M.D.	2014–present

=== Divisional Council ===
Post	Name
Director	Carlos Mariano Baeza Estrella, M.D.
Student Representative of the Medical Career	Julian Eduardo Brown

== Motto ==
The motto of the Division is "Salus Publica, Salus Mea", which means "The health of the people, the health of all." At the same time, Salus was the Roman goddess of healing, cleansing and sanitation, equivalent of Hygieia, daughter of Asclepius in Greek mythology. Also "Salus Publica" was a Latin term to designate the general welfare.

Swedish King Adolf Frederick (1710–1771), also used the motto as his royal motto.

== Student life ==
=== Dropping out ===
The averages rates of academic dropping out in 2009 – 2010 period were for Medicine 2.5, for Nursing 2.9, and for Pharmacy 3.2, being within the eleven lowest rates in this category compared to other bachelor's programs at the University of Quintana Roo. However, the causes of dropping out, unlike others academic divisions of the University are attributed to the curriculum, which did not meet expectations or to fail a course (35% for each of the causes), being the only academic division with the highest dissatisfaction with its curriculum within the UQROO.

=== Sleep habits ===
In a study published in December 2014, 63% of surveyed students from the Division said sleep less than 5 hours a day.

== Campus ==
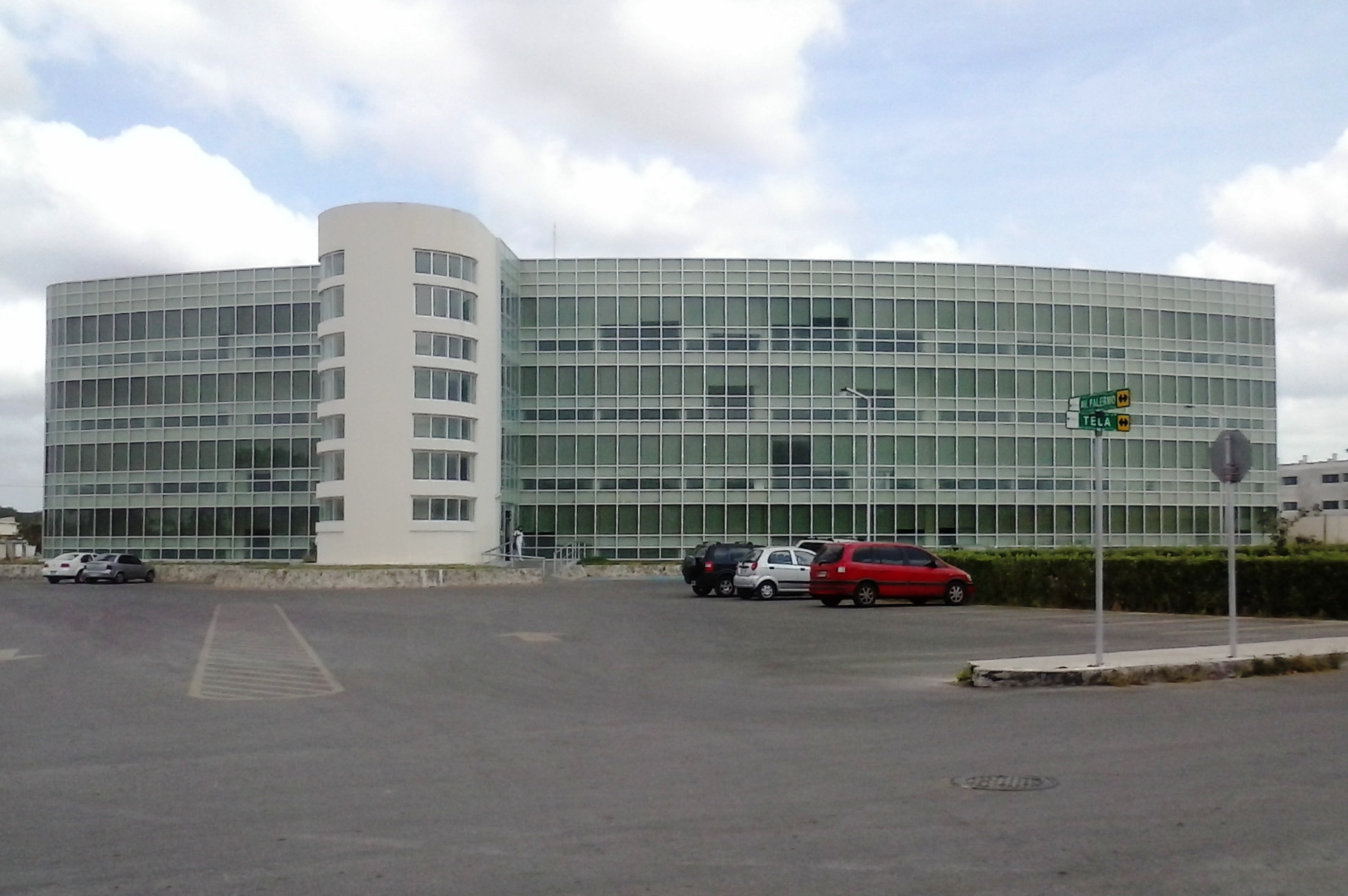
Main building

The DCS-UQROO has a surface area of 10,500 m². The main building has 4 floors, 16 classrooms, a seminar room, a room for academic work, clinical biochemistry laboratory, operating theater for teaching purposes, biotherius, administrative offices and chemical wastewater treatment plant. It has wireless Internet in each of their classrooms, and an elevator for persons with motor disabilities. Also the architecture of the building has an anti-hurricane design.

It has a medical simulation laboratory for medical education with High Fidelity Simulation androids. It also has a clinical laboratory, with access to the general public.

In November 2014, the academic staff comprised 35 full-time professors and 105 subject professors.

== Photo gallery ==
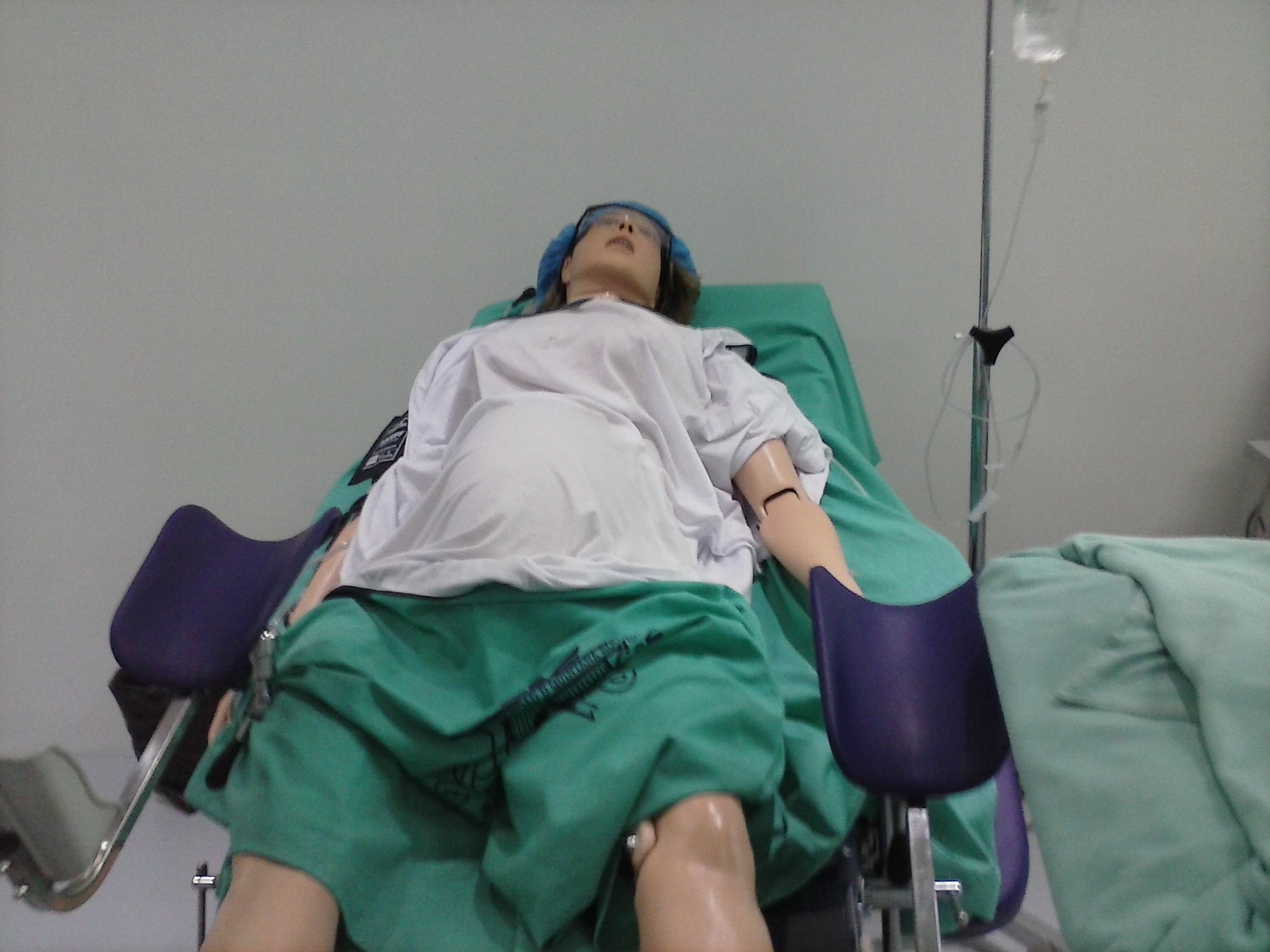
A mannequin that simulates childbirth in the Laboratory of medical simulation (DCS-UQROO)

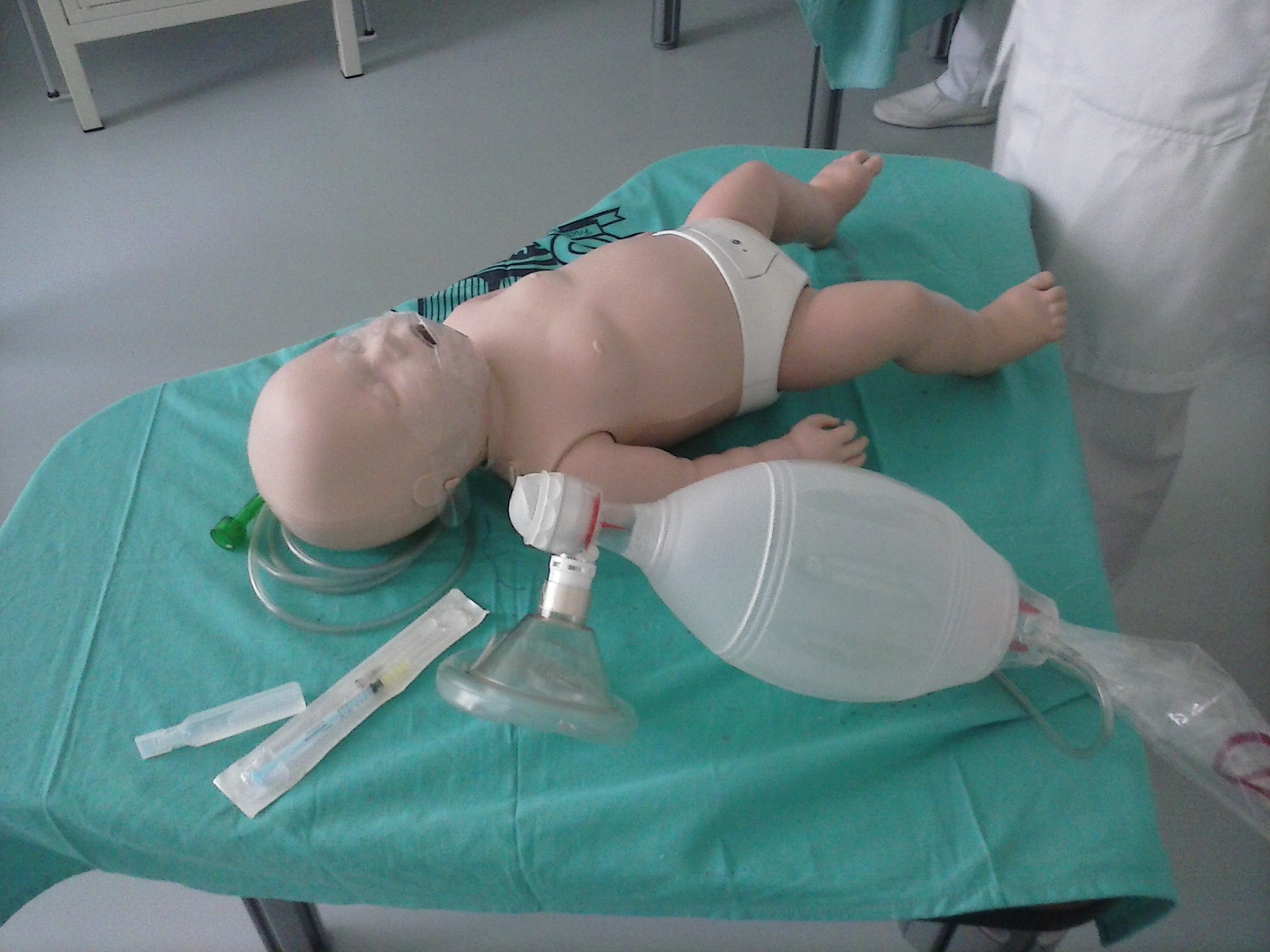
Laboratory of medical simulation (DCS-UQROO)

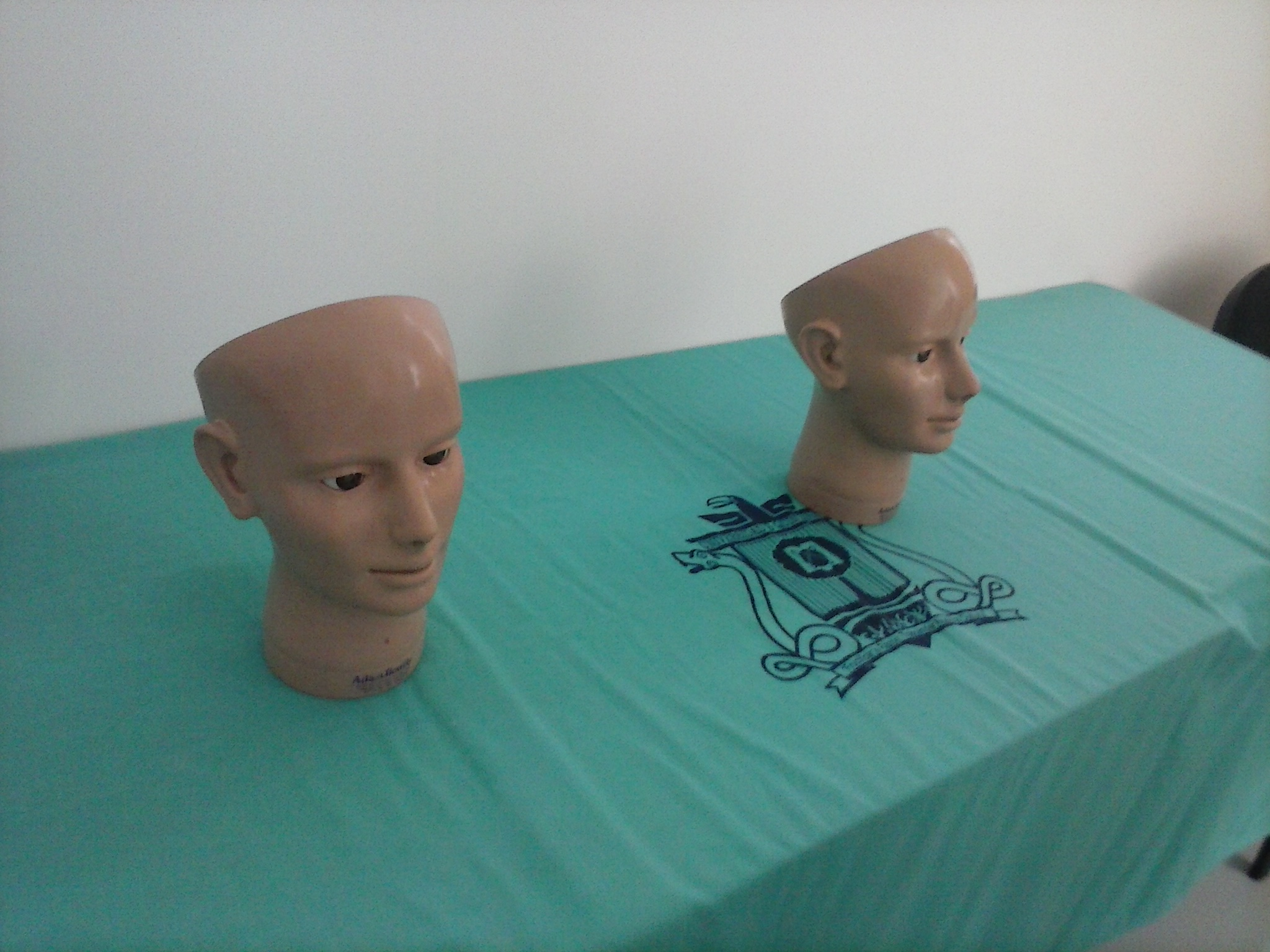
Laboratory of medical simulation (DCS-UQROO)
