= Valentin Afraimovich =

Russian-Mexican mathematician (1945–2018)

Valentin Afraimovich (Russian: Валентин Сендерович Афраймович, 2 April 1945 – 21 February 2018) was a Russian-Mexican mathematician. He made contributions to dynamical systems theory, qualitative theory of ordinary differential equations, bifurcation theory, concept of attractor, strange attractors, space-time chaos, mathematical models of non-equilibrium media and biological systems, travelling waves in lattices, complexity of orbits and dimension-like characteristics in dynamical systems.

== Biography ==
Afraimovich was born on 2 April 1945 in Kirov, Soviet Union. He got his PhD (Kandidat) degree in 1974 at the Nizhny Novgorod State University under the advice of L. P. Shil'nikov. Also in 1990 he received his Doctor of Science degree in Mathematics and Physics, at Saratov State University in Russia. After then, he held several academic positions, including:

- 1992-1995 Visiting Principal Research Scientist, Georgia Institute of Technology, Atlanta
- 1995-1996 Visiting Professor, Northwestern University, Evanston, Illinois
- 1996-1998 Visiting Professor, National Tsing Hua University, Hsinchu, Taiwan
- 1998–present Professor–researcher, IICO, Universidad Autónoma de San Luis Potosí, San Luis Potosí, Mexico

Afraimovich's students include Mark Shereshevsky, Nizhny Novgorod 1990; Todd Ray Young, Atlanta, Georgia, 1995; Antonio Morante, San Luis Potosí (SLP) Mexico, 2002; Salomé Murgia, SLP Mexico, 2003; Alberto Cordonet, SLP Mexico, 2002; Francisco Ordaz, SLP Mexico, 2004; Leticia Ramirez, SLP Mexico, 2005; Irma Tristan-Lopez, SLP Mexico, 2010; Rosendo Vazquez-Bañuelos, 2013.

He died on 21 February 2018 in Nizhny Novgorod, Russia.

== Selected bibliography ==
- Afraimovich, V.S.; V.I. Arnold; et al. (1999). Bifurcation Theory And Catastrophe Theory. Springer. ISBN 3-540-65379-1.
- Afraimovich, V.S.; I. S. Aranson; M. I. Rabinovich (1989). Multidimensional Strange Attractors and Turbulence. Harwood Academic. ISBN 3-7186-4868-7.
- Afraimovich, V.S.; Sze-Bi Hsu (2003). Lectures on Chaotic Dynamical Systems. Ams/Ip Studies in Advanced Mathematics. ISBN 0-8218-3168-2.
- Afrajmovich, V.S.; V.I. Arnold; Yu S. Il'yashenko; L. P. Shil'nikov (6 June 1994). Dynamical Systems V. Springer. ISBN 3-540-18173-3.
- Afraimovich, V.S.; V. I. Nekorkin; G. V. Osipov; V. D. Shalfeev. Stability, structures and chaos in nonlinear synchronization networks. ISBN 978-981-279-871-8.
- Afraimovich, V.S.; E. Ugalde; J. Urías (2006). Fractal Dimensions for Poincaré Recurrences (Monograph Series on Nonlinear Sciences and Complexity Volume 2). Elsevier. ISBN 0-444-52189-5.
- Афраймович, В.С.; Э. Угальде; Х. Уриас (2011). Фрактальные Размерности для Времен Возвращения Пуанкаре. R&C Dynamics, Russia. ISBN 978-5-93972-903-1.
- Luo, A.; Afraimovich V.S., eds. (2010). Hamiltonian Chaos Beyond the KAM Theory. Springer. ISBN 978-3-642-12717-5.
- Luo, A.; Afraimovich V.S., eds. (2010). Long-range Interactions, Stochasticity and Fractional Dynamics. Springer. ISBN 978-3-642-12342-9.
- Luo, A.; Afraimovich V.S., eds. (2012). Continuous Dynamical Systems. Higher Education Press Limited Company and L&H Scientific Publishing. ISBN 978-1-62155-000-6.
- Luo, A.; Afraimovich V.S., eds. (2012). Discrete and Switching Dynamical Systems. Higher Education Press Limited Company and L&H Scientific Publishing. ISBN 978-1-62155-002-0.
- Afraimovich, V.; Luo A.; Fu X. (2014). Nonlinear Dynamics and Complexity (Nonlinear Systems and Complexity). Springer-Verlag Gmbh. ISBN 978-3319023526.
- Afraimovich, V.; Machado J.A.T.; Zhang J. (2016). Complex Motions and Chaos in Nonlinear Systems (Nonlinear Systems and Complexity). Springer-Verlag Gmbh. ISBN 978-3-319-28764-5.

== Afraimovich award ==
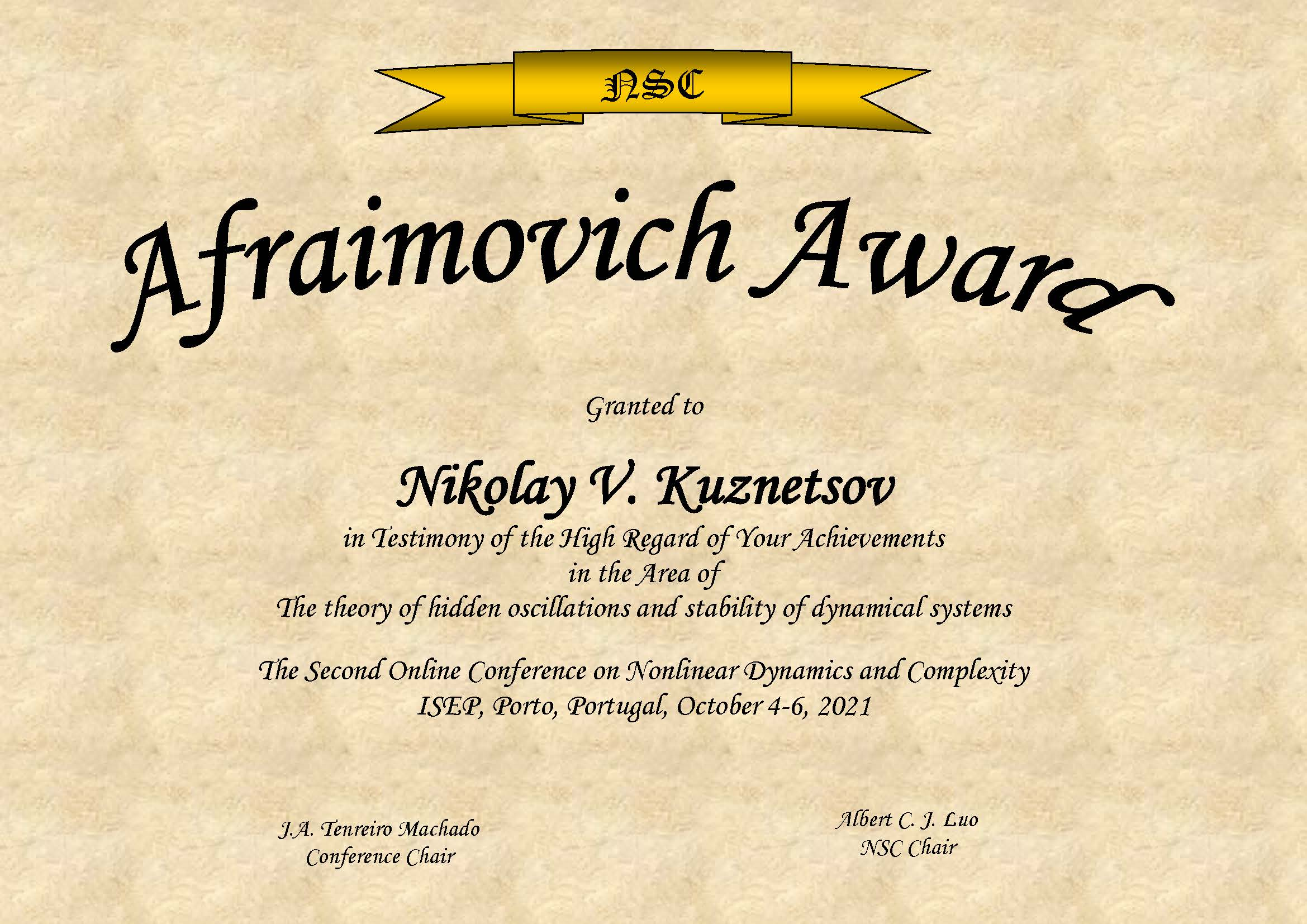
Afraimovich Award Diploma (Nikolay V. Kuznetsov, 2021)

Afraimovich Award has been granted to outstanding young scholars in nonlinear physical science by NSC since 2020. The following researchers were awarded since then: Vitali Vougalter (Canada), 2020

Ivan Ovsyannikov (Germany), 2020

Nikolay V. Kuznetsov (Russia), 2021

Michael Small (Australia),2022

Edson Denis Leonel (Brazil), 2023

Wei Lin (China), 2024

Alexey Slunyaev (Russia), 2024

Johanne Hizanidis (Greece), 2025

Cristian Bonatto (Brazil), 2025

== See also ==
- Homoclinic orbit
- Topology
- Catastrophe theory
- Torus
