= Jaime Valle Méndez =

President of UASLP
- In office January 1995 – April 2004
- Preceded by: Alfonso Lastras Ramírez
- Succeeded by: Mario García Valdez

Personal details
- Born: San Luis Potosí, Mexico
- Education: UASLP
- Profession: Professor of Engineering

Jaime Valle Méndez was president of the Autonomous University of San Luis Potosí (UASLP) during the 1995-2004 term.

At UASLP, he began his academic career, becoming a full-time professor in 1962 at the School of Engineering. He was chair of the Mechanical and Electrical Engineering Program (1968–69), dean of the School of Engineering (1984–1988), and provost of the University (1988–1994).

Valle has been actively involved in linkages with the business sector, as director of CYPESA, member of the Board of Directors in the Manufacturing Industry Chamber of San Luis Potosí and Vice President of the organization. Valle holds a bachelor's degree in engineering from the UASLP, and a specialty in business administration from the Université de Paris. He has pursued graduate studies in business administration at the UASLP.

After his retirement as president, Valle continues teaching at the School of Engineering, and collaborates as consultant with universities and the government.

| Preceded by Alfonso Lastras Ramírez | President of the Autonomous University of San Luis Potosí (UASLP); 1995-2004 | Succeeded by Mario García Valdez |
