= Silvia Degante Romero =

Mexican politician

- Born: 6 August 1969 (age 56); San Luis Potosí, Mexico
- Occupation: Politician
- Political party: PAN

Silvia Emilia Degante Romero (born 6 August 1969) is a Mexican politician from the National Action Party (PAN). In the 2006 general election she was elected to the Chamber of Deputies to represent San Luis Potosí's 6th district during the 60th session of Congress.
