= CUMEX =

Group of Mexican public higher education institutions

Mexican Consortium of Universities - Consorcio de Universidades Mexicanas
- Abbreviation: CUMex
- Formation: 2005
- Legal status: Association
- Purpose: Educational
- Headquarters: Coahuila, Mexico
- Region served: Mexico
- Members: 28 Mexican Public Higher Education Institutions (2020)
- Official language: Spanish
- President: Javier Saldaña Almazán
- Main organ: General Assembly
- Website: cumex.org.mx (Spanish)

The Mexican Consortium of Universities (Spanish: Consorcio de Universidades Mexicanas, CUMEX) is a selective group of Mexican public higher education institutions, recognized by their higher quality standards.

Founded in May 2005, CUMEX has established a rigorous selection system. Members must be affiliated with the "umbrella" national association of universities (ANUIES by its acronym in Spanish). However, not all ANUIES members are able to comply with the eligibility criteria established at CUMEX.

Membership at CUMEX constitutes a reference about Mexican higher education institutions holding higher quality standards than their peers.

== Educational quality eligibility criteria ==
A CUMEX member institution must comply with the following criteria:

- Being a public university member of the National Association of Universities and Higher Education Institutions ANUIES.
- Having at least 85% of students enrolled in academic programs which are accredited according with the mechanisms established at the national system of evaluation and accreditation being accredited de la matrícula total en programas evaluables de técnico superior, professional asociado y licenciatura reconocidos por su buena calidad por el sistema nacional de evaluación y acreditación de la educación superior de México.
- Having at least 50% of their full-time professors holding a graduate appropriate credential.
- Having at least one graduate program being included in the Mexican Roster of Quality Graduate Programs (Padrón Nacional de Posgrados, PNP).
- Holding an ISO certification in the following management processes: Registrar, Administration and Finances, Human Resources, and Library.
- Having established formal accountability and freedom of information policies and practices.
- Being included in the National Roster of Scientific and Technological Institutions and Corporations (Registro Nacional de Instituciones y Empresas Científicas y Tecnológicas: RENIECyT).
- Having implemented a series of academic and administrative policies.

== Membership ==
The following is the list of current member institutions at CUMEX. There are 28 as of 2020.

- BUAP: Meritorious Autonomous University of Pueblo
- UAA: Autonomous University of Aguascalientes
- UABC: Autonomous University of Baja California
- UABCS: Autonomous University of Baja California Sur
- UACJ: Universidad Autónoma de Ciudad Juárez
- UADY: Universidad Autónoma de Yucatán
- UAdeC: Autonomous University of Coahuila
- UAEH: Universidad Autónoma del Estado de Hidalgo
- UAEM: Autonomous University of Mexico State
- UAGRO: Autonomous University of Guerrero
- UAQ: Autonomous University of Queretaro
- UASLP: Universidad Autónoma de San Luis Potosí
- UAS: Autonomous University of Sinaloa
- UAT: Autonomous University of Tamaulipas
- UATx: Autonomous University of Tlaxcala
- UAZ: Autonomous University of Zacatecas
- UCOL: University of Colima
- UdeG: University of Guadalajara
- UG: Universidad de Guanajuato
- UJAT: Universidad Juárez Autónoma de Tabasco
- UJED: Universidad Juárez del Estado de Durango
- UNACAR: Autonomous University of Carmen
- UNICACH: University of Sciences and Arts of Chiapas
- UMich: Universidad Michoacana de San Nicolás de Hidalgo
- UO: Universidad de Occidente
- UQROO: University of Quintana Roo
- UNISON: Universidad de Sonora
- UV: Universidad Veracruzana

== Presidents ==
The General Assembly elects a president among the rectors of the member institutions.

List of presidents:

- 2005-2008: Mario Garcia-Valdez, UASLP
- 2008-2010: Luis Gil Borja, UAEH
- 2010-2012: Mario Alberto Ochoa Rivera, UAdeC
- 2014-2016: Humberto Augusto Veras Godoy, UAEH
- 2016-: Javier Saldaña Almazán, UAGRO
