= Juan Pablo Escobar Martínez =

Mexican politician

Juan Pablo Escobar
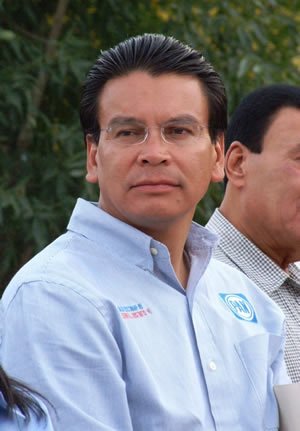
- Juan Pablo Escobar in 2009.
- Born: Juan Pablo Escobar; 25 January 1963 (age 63); San Luis Potosí, Mexico
- Occupation: Politician
- Political party: PAN

Juan Pablo Escobar Martínez (born 25 January 1963) is a Mexican politician from the National Action Party (PAN). In the 2009 mid-terms he was elected to the Chamber of Deputies to represent San Luis Potosí's 6th district during the 61st session of Congress.
