= Francisco Xavier Salazar Diez =

Mexican politician

- Born: 3 May 1968 (age 58); San Luis Potosí, San Luis Potosí, Mexico
- Education: Autonomous University of San Luis Potosí

Francisco Xavier Salazar Diez de Sollano (born 3 May 1968) was the Chair of the Mexican Energy Regulatory Commission (CRE) from 2005 to 2015. He also chaired the Ibero-american Association of Energy Regulators (ARIAE) from 2011 to 2105. He is currently the Chair of Mexico's National Committee of the World Energy Council.

Prior to being the Chair of the CRE, he served in the Chamber of Deputies as a member of the National Action Party (PAN) for San Luis Potosí's 6th district during the 57th and 59th sessions of Congress (1997–2000 and 2003–2006), where he chaired the Energy Committee.

He is considered as one of the architects of Mexico's energy reform.

He is the son of Francisco Xavier Salazar Saenz, a former Senator and former Secretary of Labor.
