= Felipe de Jesús Almaguer =

Mexican politician

- Born: 21 February 1974 (age 52); San Luis Potosí, San Luis Potosí, Mexico
- Occupation: Politician
- Political party: PAN

Felipe de Jesús Almaguer Torres (born 21 February 1974) is a Mexican politician affiliated with the National Action Party (PAN). In the 2012 general election he was elected to the Chamber of Deputies to represent San Luis Potosí's 6th district during the 62nd session of Congress.
