= Universidad del Noreste =

Private university in Mexico

Universidad del Noreste (Northeastern University)
- Northeastern University
- Motto: Por mi patria, ciencia y progreso
- Motto in English: For my country, science and progress
- Type: Private
- Established: September 2, 1970
- Academic affiliations: COMAEM, AMFEM, WHO, CONAHEC, FIMPES, ANUIES.
- Rector: CP. Fernando R. Chung Hernandez.
- Location: Tampico, Tamaulipas, Mexico; 22.2834°N 97.8722°W
- Colors: Wine red and white
- Sporting affiliations: Jaguares Une
- Mascot: JAGUARS
- Website: www.une.edu.mx

The Universidad del Noreste (UNE) (Northeastern University), is a private Mexican university founded in 1970; it was the first private institution of higher education established in the state of Tamaulipas. UNE is located in Tampico. UNE enrolls students from the local area, along with students from around the world who board at the school.

== Organization ==
UNE is divided into academic departments rather than faculties, with both undergraduate and postgraduate studies. UNE offers programs targeting continuing education and knowledge updating for professionals.

UNE also provides the Preparatoria UNE, a preparatory school that educates its students with all college-level courses.

== History ==
UNE was founded on September 2, 1970, by a group of local doctors who were inspired with new ideas for a better education in Mexico. These people were led by Dr. Jose Sierra Flores, a surgeon.

It was first named "Instituto de Ciencias Biologicas del Noreste" (Biological Sciences Institute of the Northeast), and it started with the School of Medicine named after its founder "Dr. Jose Sierra Flores".

UNE has been a pioneer in education in Tamaulipas, with different Bachelor's degrees, in pharmaceutical chemistry and biology, biological sciences, psychology, graphic design; and some Master's degrees in ecology and family therapy.

In the 1990s UNE established its preparatory school, "Prepa UNE". During this decade UNE was accredited by the Federation of Private Mexican Institutions of Higher Education (FIMPES).

In 2000, UNE started its "Modern Educational Plan 2000"; during this year UNE opened the Foreign Language Center.

In 2005, UNE received accreditation by the National Association of Universities and Higher Education Institutions (ANUIES).

In 2007, the School of Medicine opened the Teaching Center of Medical Aptitudes and Skills (CEDAM), the first Medical Simulation Center in Tamaulipas. CEDAM is a teaching hospital-simulator in which students can practice medical procedures with robotic patients, improving their skills.

In 2008, the Academic Department of Health Sciences opened two new schools, the School of Nursing and the School of Nutrition. During this year, UNE received an award in academic excellence from the Secretariat of Public Education for having more than 80 percent of its student body in undergraduate and postgraduate programs.

In 2009, the Department of Postgraduate Education opened the Master's degree in Medical Sciences and the B-learning education, starting UNE Distance Education through Virtual-UNE.

In 2010, CEDAM was relocated to a bigger and better facility, acquiring the newest robotic equipment so that young doctors, nurses and nutritionists (students from the Department of Health Sciences) could work together at the Medical Simulation Center.

== UNE School of Medicine ==
The UNE School of Medicine is approved by the government of Mexico to confer the degree of Physician-Surgeon. The UNE School of Medicine has been recognized for academic and clinical training; one of these is the accreditation by the Mexican Council for the Accreditation of Medical Education (COMAEM). The School of Medicine is also listed in the World Health Organization.

=== Teaching Center of Medical Aptitudes and Skills ===
In 2007, the School of Medicine opened the Teaching Center of Medical Aptitudes and Skills (CEDAM), the first Medical Simulation Center in the state of Tamaulipas. CEDAM is a Medical Simulation Center in which students can practice medical procedures with robotic patients.

In 2010, CEDAM was relocated to a bigger facility, acquiring the newest robotic equipment so that young doctors, nurses and nutritionists (students from the Department of Health Sciences), could work together at the Medical Simulation Center.

=== Clinical training ===
The medical program of the UNE School of Medicine is approved for clinical training in local, national and international clinical centers and affiliated hospitals; among them are hospitals in the United States, such as Texas, New York, Illinois and New Jersey; and other countries including Puerto Rico, Switzerland and Venezuela.

In Mexico alone, the UNE School of Medicine has agreements with over 50 hospitals, among them are the Instituto Nacional de Ciencias Medicas y Nutricion Salvador Zubiran, Hospital Medica Sur and Hospital Christus Muguerza.

== Academic departments and schools ==
The research and teaching staff of UNE is divided into five academic departments, which in turn are divided into 20 multi-disciplinary schools. These academic departments, each headed by an Executive Dean, are as follows:

=== Department of Health Sciences ===
- School of Medicine
- School of Nursing
- School of Nutrition

=== Department of Chemistry and Chemical Biology ===
- School of Pharmaceutical Chemistry and Biology
- School of Clinical Chemistry
- School of Industrial Chemistry
- School of Biological Sciences
- School of Environmental Sciences

=== Department of Behavioural and Educational Sciences ===
- School of Education
- School of Psychology

=== Department of Arts and Humanities ===
- School of Architecture
- School of Digital Communication
- School of Graphic Design and Multimedia Arts
- School of Marketing and Publicity
- School of Communication Sciences
- School of Interior Design

=== Department of Economic and Administrative Sciences ===
- School of Tourism and Hospitality Management
- School of Accounting and Finance
- School of Computer Science and Electronic Engineering
- School of Industrial Engineering

== Accreditation and Affiliation ==
=== School of Medicine ===
- COMAEM - Mexican Council for the Accreditation of Medical Education
- AMFEM - Mexican Association of Schools and Faculties of Medicine
- WHO - World Health Organization
- CONAHEC - Consortium for North American Higher Education Collaboration
- UDUAL - Union of Latin America and Caribbean Universities
- Puerto Rican Tribunal of Physicians

=== Other accreditations ===
- FIMPES - Federation of Private Mexican Institutions of Higher Education
- SEP - Recognition of Academic Excellence by Secretariat of Public Education
- ANUIES - National Association of Universities and Higher Education Institutions
- AMBC - Mexican Association of Clinical Biochemistry, A.C.
- ENCUADRE - Mexican Association of Graphic Design Schools
- CONEICC - National Council of Teaching and Investigation in Communication Sciences
- ANECO-National Association of Communication Students
- CNEIP - National Council of Teaching and Investigation in Psychology
- ANFECA - National Association of Schools and Faculties of Accounting and Administration
- CACECA - Accreditation Council of Teaching in Accounting and Administration
