= Universidad Hispanoamericana =

- Logo Universidad Hispanoamericana
- Motto: Lo nuestro es la excelencia
- Type: Private
- Established: 1982
- Founders: Ángel Marín Espinoza
- Location: San José, Costa Rica
- Colours: Blue and Light Blue
- Website: www.uh.ac.cr

The Universidad Hispanoamericana is a major private university in San José, Costa Rica that specializes in business administration, engineering, psychology and medical studies. It was founded in 1982.

The programs, techniques, and facilities are modern — creating driven professionals with internationally recognised degrees. Based in San José, Universidad Hispanoamerica has campuses in other provinces including Cartago and Heredia.
