= Radio Universidad Autónoma de Guerrero =

University radio station in Chilpancingo, Guerrero, Mexico

Chilpancingo, Guerrero; Mexico
- Frequency: 840 kHz; 90.7 MHz (to move to 101.9 MHz — XHCPEV-FM)

Programming
- Format: Public radio

Ownership
- Owner: Autonomous University of Guerrero

History
- First air date: May 4, 1982 (AM); June 19, 2012 (FM)
- Former names: Radio Universidad Pueblo
- Former frequencies: 880 kHz, 1180 kHz

Technical information
- Power: 3 kW day 0.5 kW night
- Transmitter coordinates: 17°33′24.4″N 99°30′18.3″W

Links
- Website: radiouagro.com

Radio Universidad Autónoma de Guerrero (Radio UAGro), frequently unofficially known as XEUAG, is a radio station owned by the Autonomous University of Guerrero (Spanish: Universidad Autónoma de Guerrero, UAGro) in the state capital of Chilpancingo, Guerrero, Mexico. The station broadcasts without a permit or concession on 840 kHz AM and 90.7 MHz FM.

The university has broadcast radio programming since 1982 and for more than 40 years lacked any legal authorization to do so. The first decade of the station's history was mired in a series of politically charged disputes. The Mexican government refused to grant a permit for the station alleging there were no available frequencies in the area even though just two stations operated in the vicinity of Chilpancingo; it admitted that, for "confidential reasons", it could not award the station. When it did go on the air, it was jammed and also experienced interference from the state's venture into public radio. The station moved to three other Guerrero cities before returning to Chilpancingo. It then left the air from 1985 to 1987 as part of a failed settlement with the federal government which ended when the government reneged on its terms.

An FM signal was launched in 2012. After a 2022 seizure attempt by federal officials, the university applied for and received a concession to legalize the station for the first time in its history.

== History ==
=== Sign-on and early frequency battles ===
The lengthy history of the Universidad Autónoma de Guerrero in radio began in 1982, when after several years of failed attempts to obtain a permit for a radio station, the university had enough. The spark was one last rejection by the Secretariat of Communications and Transportation, which in a letter to the university claimed that their technical studies showed the band to be saturated. University engineers, however, saw it differently, showing that within 100 kilometers of Chilpancingo there were just two commercial radio stations. The reply from the SCT simply admitted that, for "confidential reasons", the university could not be awarded a permit.

In order to begin operations, the university took legal action and simultaneously, on May 4, 1982, launched "Radio Universidad Pueblo". The station operated on 880 kHz. In deciding to sidestep the federal government, which had shown itself to be frustrating to universities' attempts at launching radio stations, the Universidad Autónoma de Guerrero entered uncharted territory. The next month, the station began to suffer serious interference, requiring the university to take drastic action to maintain a listenable signal. In one attempt, the station constantly changed frequencies in order to evade the interference, which also prompted the public to take interest in the new station.

On December 15, the university put into action the first phase of what it termed Operación Bucanero (Operation Buccaneer), constructing a second transmitter (known as the Buccaneer, as it was designed to combat pirates) on 1180 kHz.

In early 1983, the station suffered another frequency setback when XEGRO-AM 870 "Radio Guerrero", the first radio station operated by the state government, signed on. With just 10 kHz separation between the two stations, Radio Universidad Pueblo had to move, and instead of moving frequencies, it moved physically, broadcasting from Acapulco, Ciudad Altamirano and Taxco. On May 20, 1983, the roving radio station came to an end, with the university broadcasting once more from Chilpancingo — this time, without interference.

=== Budget woes and restart ===
Another problem to the university radio station developed in 1984: a budget crisis spurred by a suspension of payments from the Secretariat of Public Education (SEP). Workers spent all of 1984 without receiving their salaries, and in January 1985, the university and SEP began negotiating. The federal government required the university to shut down the station, and on January 15, 1985, Radio Universidad Pueblo went off the air. In the meantime, university students went as far as organizing a hunger strike in Mexico City in order to protest the SEP's demand to close the station.

The SEP, however, failed to keep some of its promises to the university. A new rector, Ramón Reyes Carreto, decided that if the SEP would not keep its promises, the university did not have a reason to stay off the air. In June 1987, Radio Universidad returned to the air — having shortened its name. A year later, Governor José Francisco Ruiz Massieu awarded a permit to the university, giving the station the ability to broadcast with 3,000 watts of power. However, the federal government (now through the Federal Telecommunications Institute) is solely responsible for radio station permits and concessions. Since then, the university station has broadcast, though its legal status has often been murky, and it had never been federally recognized.

=== On FM ===
On June 19, 2012, the university signed on an FM station without a permit, on 90.7 MHz, around the same time that Chilpancingo's properly licensed radio stations moved to the FM band.

In 2016, Carmen Aristegui visited the radio station, and one studio was dedicated in her honor.

=== 2022 seizure attempt and concession ===
On February 23, 2022, representatives of the IFT and the National Guard visited Radio UAGro and executed a seizure order against the unauthorized FM operation. Local residents and journalists prevented the IFT from dismantling the station's facilities. The rector of the UAG, Víctor Wences Martínez, described the seizure attempt as an attack on free speech and university autonomy.

In September 2022, as part of a filing window with the IFT, the university applied for the available 101.9 MHz frequency in Chilpancingo. The state government also applied for the frequency, but as the university applied first, it had priority and was awarded the concession for XHCPEV-FM on August 2, 2023.

== Programming ==
Radio UAGro has a generally cultural and public service program format, similar to other university stations. It has a high proportion of programs produced in-house as well as content in indigenous languages such as Nahuatl and Mixtec.

The station is known for opening its microphones to dissident groups and has done so for such parties as Ayotzinapa Rural Normal School students and survivors of the Aguas Blancas massacre. As such, where such groups usually have to take other Chilpancingo stations by force, XEUAG has simply ceded time to them.
