= University of Quintana Roo =

Public university in Mexico

- Universidad de Quintana Roo
- Motto: Spanish: Fructificar la razón: trascender nuestra cultura
- Motto in English: "Fructify reason: transcend our culture"
- Type: Public university
- Established: 24 May 1991
- Academic affiliations: ANUIES, CONAHEC
- Rector: Ángel Ezequiel Rivero Palomo
- Academic staff: 350
- Students: 5,359
- Undergraduates: 5,241
- Postgraduates: 118
- Location: Chetumal, Quintana Roo, Mexico; 18.5242°N 88.2709°W
- Campus: Chetumal (Main), Playa del Carmen, Cozumel, Cancún
- Colors: Green and gold
- Mascot: Toucan
- Website: www.uqroo.mx

The University of Quintana Roo (in Spanish: Universidad de Quintana Roo, UQROO) is a Mexican public university with several campuses across the state of Quintana Roo, in the Yucatán Peninsula. It was created on 24 May 1991.

Its Division of Health Sciences was formally opened on October 23, 2010.

Its library system holds over 36,634 volumes.

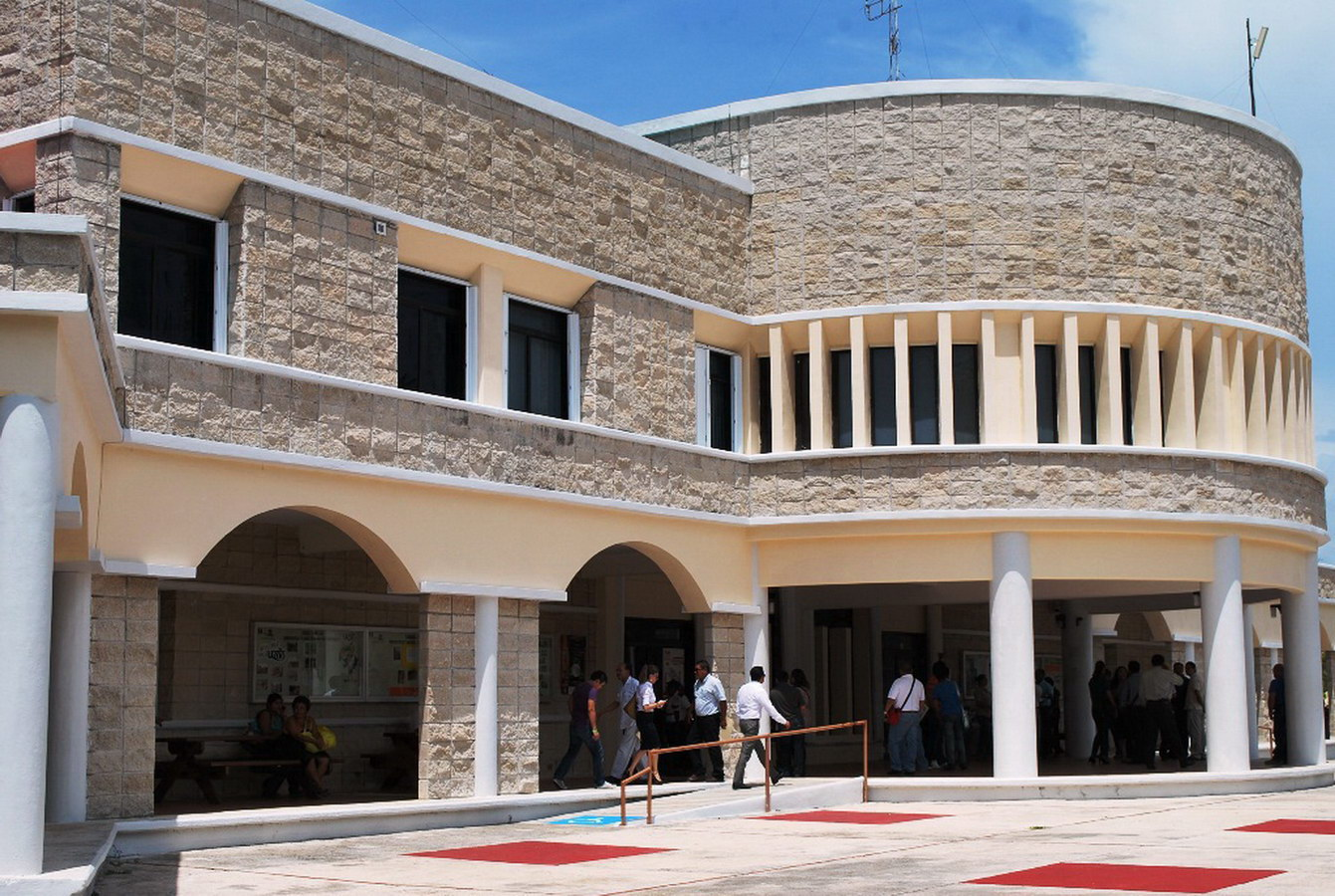
Main building

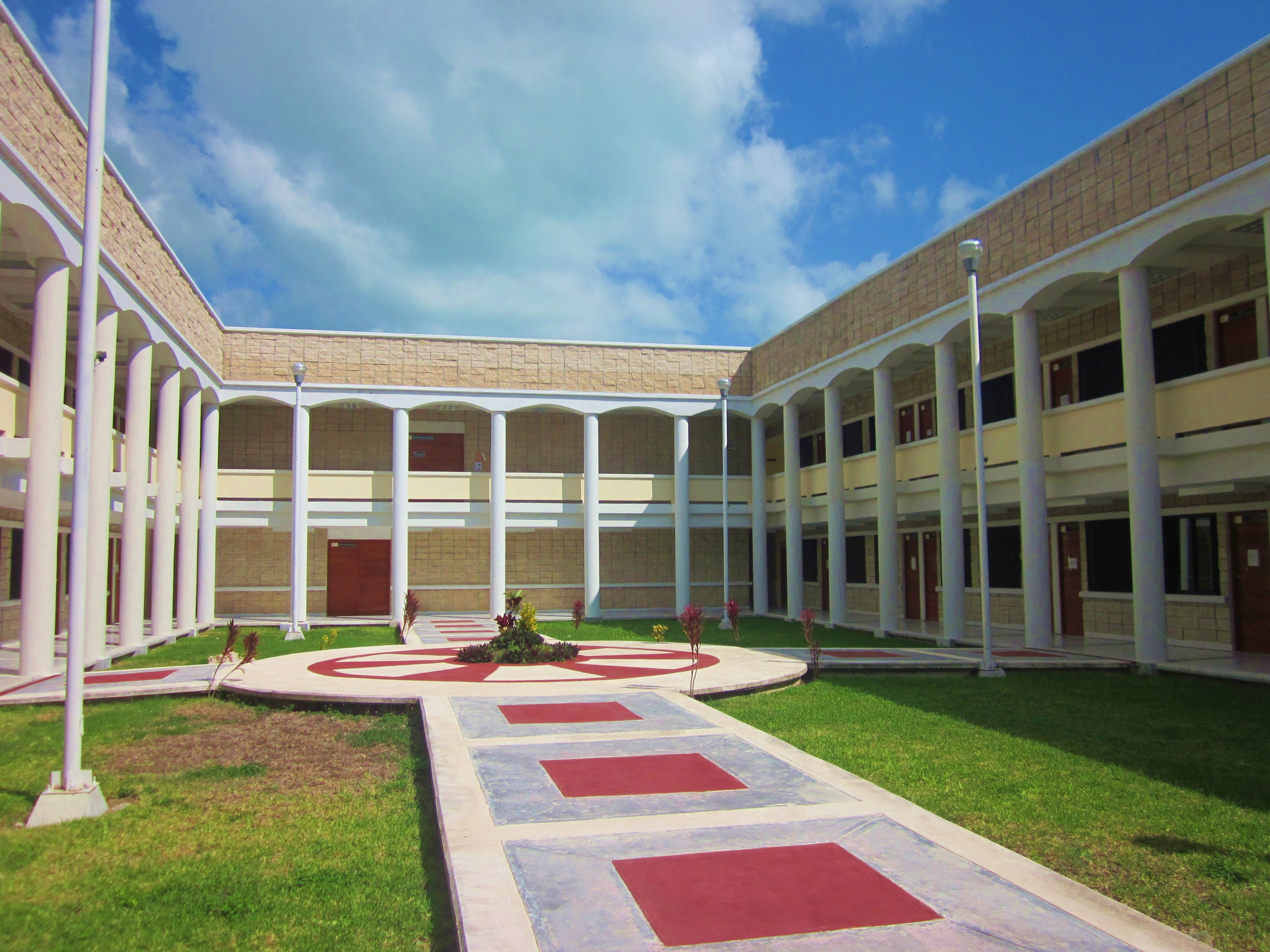

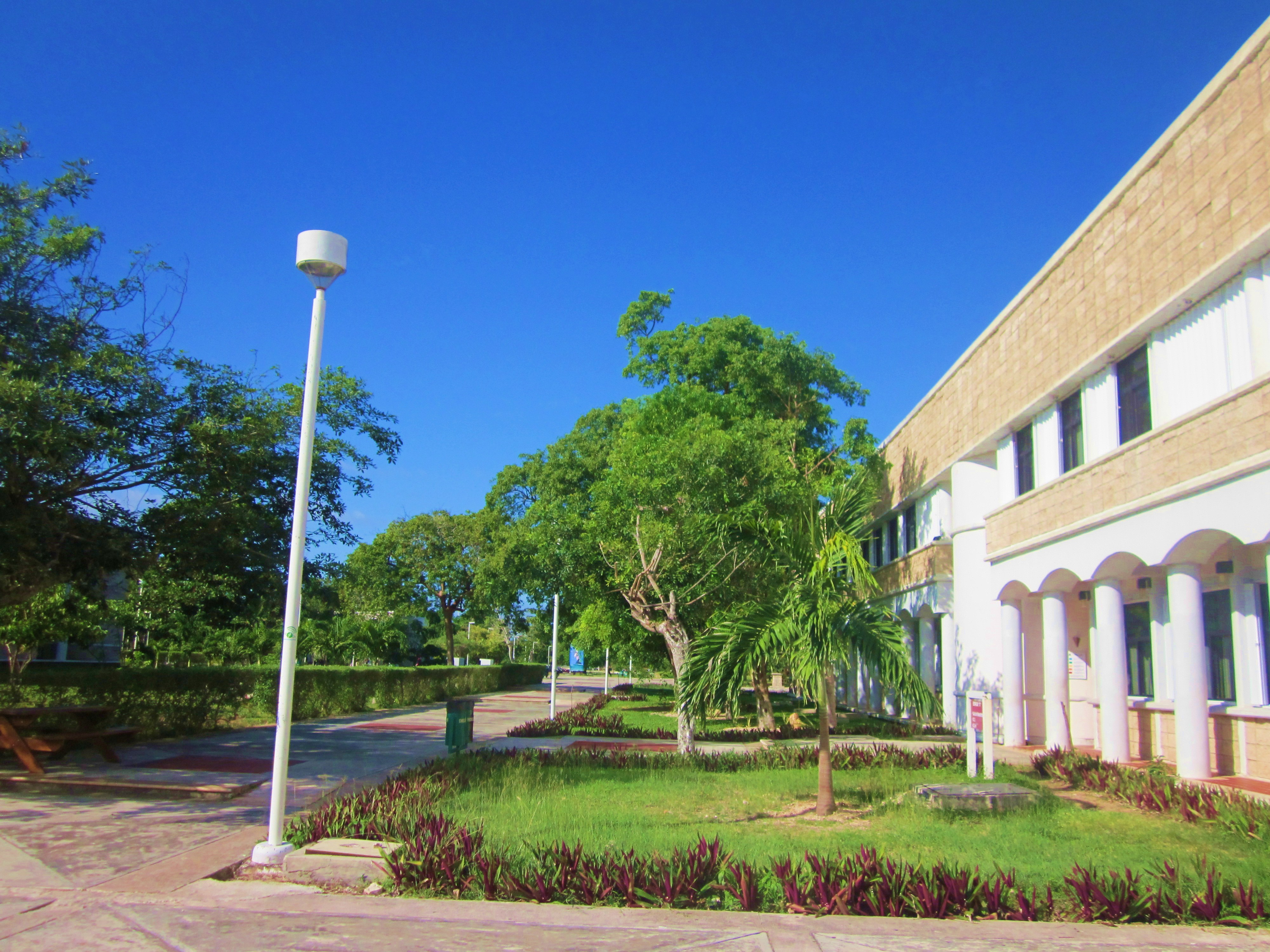

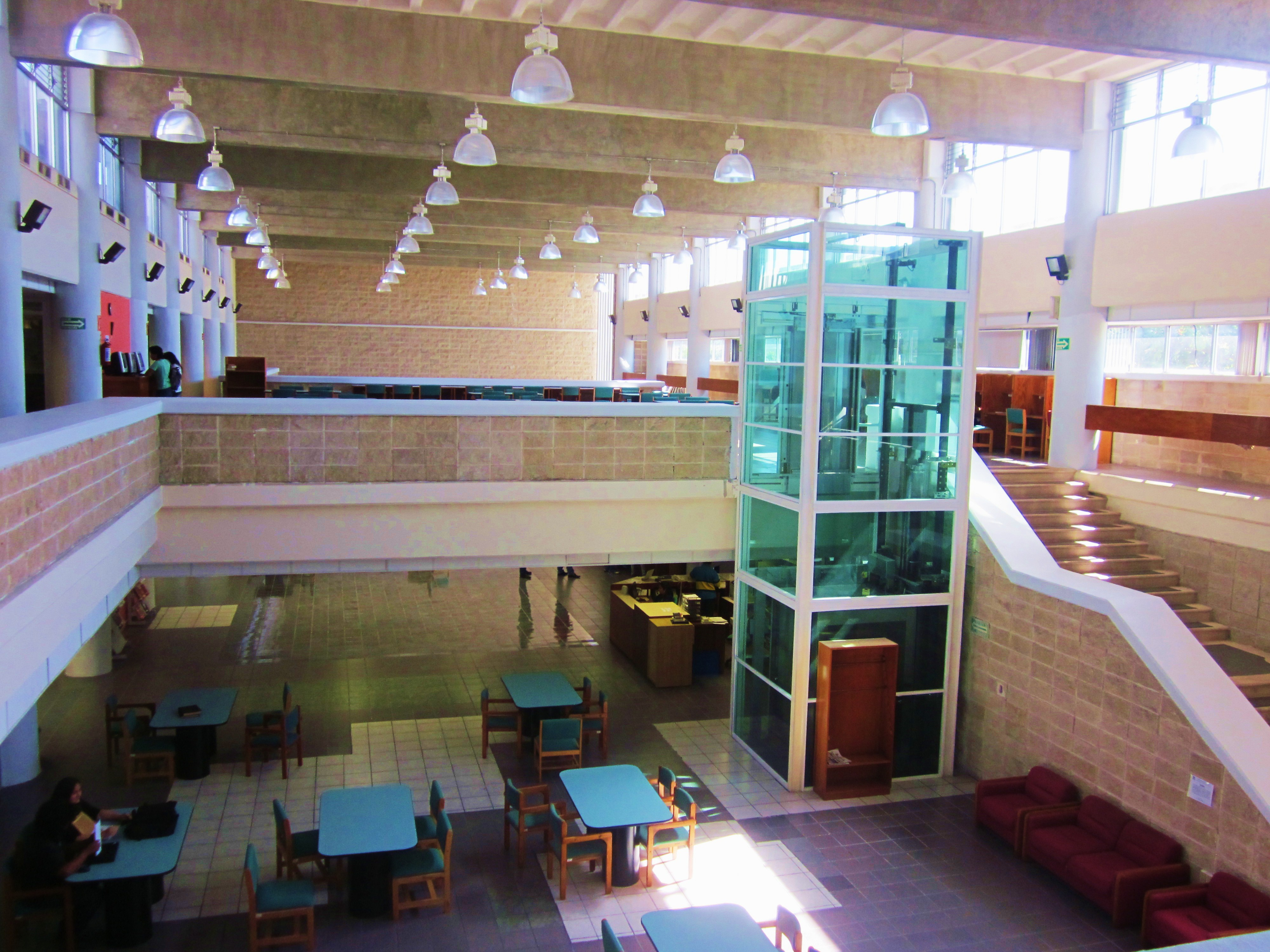
Library
