= Xochicalco University =

Private university in Mexico

- Centro de Estudios Universitarios Xochicalco (CEUX); Universidad Xochicalco
- Motto: "...And the truth shall make you free"
- Type: Private
- Established: 1974
- Location: Baja california, Mexico
- Campus: Ensenada, Tijuana, Mexicali
- Language: Spanish
- Mascot: Coyotes
- Website: www.xochicalco.edu.mx
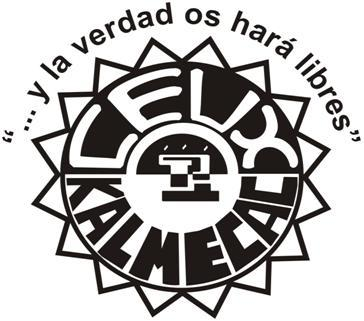

The Xochicalco University (Spanish: Centro de Estudios Universitarios Xochicalco) is a private university with campuses in Tijuana, Ensenada, and Mexicali in Baja California, Mexico. It has a medical school as well as an International Medical Graduate (IMG) program. It also offers programs in optometry, medicine, law, Master in Criminal Justice, Master in Constitutional Law, Master in Tax Law, Master in Labour Law, Master in Criminology, MBA, architecture, education, criminology, graphic design and psychology.

It offers a trilingual high school program where students take three hours of French per week, and where half of their subjects are in Spanish, and the rest in English.

Its sports teams, the Coyotes, play volleyball, Soccer, football, flag football and basketball

Civic and cultural activities are also part of the school to name a few the school has ° Arts ° Music ° Chess ° Theater ° Salsa dance ° Photography ° Self Defense ° Jazz
