= Yolanda González (artist) =

Yolanda Gonzalez
- Born: 1964 (age 61–62)
- Known for: Painting, ceramics

Yolanda González (born 1964) is a Chicana multimedia artist based in Los Angeles. She primarily works in ceramics, drawing, painting, and printmaking.

== Biography ==
Yolanda Gonzalez was born in 1964 in San Gabriel Valley after her parents came from Mexico. Gonzalez is one of five children. She is descended from a family of artists, whose early work can be dated to 1877. At seven years old, Gonzalez received a painting set from her grandmother which started her interest in the arts. Gonzalez works was first presented to a public audience in 1988 at the First Annual Nuevo Chicano Los Angeles Art Exhibition at Plaza de la Raza. She did not develop her current art style of bright, vivid colors with Chicano influence until she worked at Self-Help Graphics & Art and experimented with printmaking. Gonzalez has lived as an artist-in-residence in Madrid, Spain, Ginza, Japan, Assisi, Italy, and part of the Ratkovitch Company's The Alhambra. At the age of twenty-nine the death of friend made her change the way she viewed the world and influenced her art. She returned to the U.S. from Japan in 1993 where she worked on her series Metamorphosis I. She has lived in Alhambra, California for over 20 years, where her art residency and studio is also located for the past 10 years, called Ma Art Gallery. She has taught art for other organizations such as Inner City Arts, Para Los Niños, Plaza De La Raza, Crenshaw Christian Center, and MOCA.

== Education ==
Gonzalez attended San Gabriel Mission High School, where an art teacher first discovered her talents. Gonzalez was entered in an art contest by her art teacher and she placed 1st. At eighteen years old, Gonzalez attended the Art Center College of Design in Pasadena. Gonzalez got a scholarship to the college from winning a painting competition. Gonzalez has a BA in liberal studies.

== Artworks ==
=== Style and influence ===
Gonzalez is stylistically known for her incorporation of bright, vivid colors that are heavily influenced by her cultural background of being Chicana, as well as incorporating some inspiration from 20th century German expressionism. Her favorite mediums isacrylic on canvas. Gonzalez enjoys working with ceramics and wooden panels as well. In the 1990s Gonzalez experimented with a new darker, monochromatic style with her series Metamorphosis I that reflected her feeling and life at that time. Gonzalez enjoys traveling in order to find a form of influence and inspiration for her artwork. Gonzalez's experiences and the people she meets during her travels are reflected in her works.

=== Commissioned work ===
Gonzalez has been commissioned by Para Los Niños, The White Memorial Medical Center, and Greyhound Lines Inc. to paint murals. Another commissioned work was for the Los Angeles Cultural Affairs calendar.

=== Sueño de Familia/Dream of Family ===
This exhibit showcases a retrospective of artwork produced by Gonzalez and her family in the past 150 years. Family members' artwork included in the exhibit consists of Gonzalez's mother, grandmother, grandfather, and her niece. Starting from the 1870s to now, artworks presented are drawings, paintings, ceramics, and printmaking. Gonzalez' series Sueños /Dreams (2000–Present), was included in the exhibit.

=== Metamorphosis I & II ===
Metamorphosis shows a transition in style from bright vivid colors to an only monochromatic color palette. Metamorphosis I represents Gonzalez's past life experiences to how the world is now. She started the series 1994–1997 after returning to the U.S. from her residency in Japan in 1993. Around that time she lost a close friend which caused a change in how she viewed her morality, spirituality, and how she approached making art. In 2020, Gonzalez worked on Metamorphosis II. Metamorphosis II reflects on Gonzalez's loss of her mother and the impact of COVID-19. Metamorphosis I was influenced by Japanese styles and zen concepts. Metamorphosis II fuses Japanese styles with her Chicana background. Metamorphosis consists of 30 artworks for the series.

== Solo exhibitions ==
- Nov 17, 2015 - Feb 29, 2016, Faces of The Community, AARP
- Nov 14, 2020 - Jan 16, 2021 - Metamorphosis, Bermudez Projects

== Group exhibitions ==
Nov 16, 2019 - March 15, 2020 - Sueño de Familia / Five Generations of Artists, Vincent Price Museum

== Published works ==
- Gonzalez, Yolanda. Yolanda Gonzalez: Metamorphosis . Bermudez Projects, n.d. ISBN 9781732561274

== Awards ==
Gonzalez received an award from the Los Angeles County Commission for Women's Thirty-third Annual Women of the Year Arts award in 2018. Two other awards are the KCET Unsung Hero Award/Latin Heritage Month and the Angel Award/Artist of the Year.

== Bibliography ==
- Alfaro, Luis, Tomas Benitez, Kristine Kim, and Leonard Simon. 1996. Finding family stories: Judy Chan, Charles Dickson, Yolanda Gonzalez, Kori Newkirk, Miguel Angel Reyes, David Alan Yamamoto.The California State Senate Contemporary California Art Collection. United States: California State Senate, 2003.
- ART HOUR WITH AVENUE 50: Artist Talk with Yolanda Gonzalez. YouTube. YouTube, 2021. https://www.youtube.com/watch?v=UyrA9QFHNgQ&ab_channel=Avenue50StudioInc.
- ArtQuench. “Velia La Garda Produces a Tribute to the Late-Great Lupe Ontiveros.” Be Inspired! ...and Get ArtQuenched!, October 25, 2013. https://artquenchmagazine.com/2013/10/23/velia-la-garda-produces-a-tribute-to-the-late-great-lupe-ontiveros/.
- Centeno, Jimmy. “The Millennial Practice in Yolanda Gonzalez's and YOLA's Ceramics.” Fabrik Magazine, January 16, 2018. https://fabrikmagazine.com/the-millennial-practice-in-yolanda-gonzalezs-and-yolas-ceramics/.
- Cigainero, Jake. “Celebrating a Partnership of Two West Coasts.” The New York Times. The New York Times, September 9, 2014. https://www.nytimes.com/2014/09/10/arts/international/mexican-american-street-art-from-los-angeles-comes-to-bordeaux.html.
- Davalos, Karen Mary. Chicana-o Remix: Art and Errata since the Sixties. New York: New York University press, 2017.
- “Gallery Exhibitions.” Gallery Exhibitions | Pacific Standard Time. http://www.pacificstandardtime.org/lala/en/gallery-exhibitions/index.html.The California State Senate Contemporary California Art Collection. the University of California, 2003.
- Discover Los Angeles. “The Best Is Yet to Come: Horse Art Pop-Up Celebrates the 2016 Breeders' Cup.” Discover Los Angeles, March 14, 2019. https://www.discoverlosangeles.com/things-to-do/the-best-is-yet-to-come-horse-art-pop-up-celebrates-the-2016-breeders-cup.Garcia, Sam. “Santa Fe Springs Art Fest 2019.” El Paisano, May 8, 2019. https://elpaisanoonline.com/news/2019/05/08/santa-fe-springs-art-fest-2019/.
- Interview with Yolanda Gonzalez. YouTube. YouTube, 2020. https://www.youtube.com/watch?v=ZbU_HcQ0x6c&ab_channel=Inner-CityArts.
- Latina Art & Culture | Yolanda Gonzalez + More | Talks at Google. YouTube. YouTube, 2017. https://www.youtube.com/watch?v=vckNcYpZVCM&ab_channel=TalksatGoogle.
- Tompkins Rivera, Pilar, and Karen Mary Davalos. Yolanda Gonzalez: Sueño De Familia / Dream of Family. Vincent Price Art Museum, 2019. ISBN 9780578574462
- “VALLEY WEEKEND: Archetype of Nude Reveals New Meanings: Yolanda Gonzalez Explores the Theme of Self-Examination in Her Painting Series, 'Metamorphosis.'.” Los Angeles Times. Los Angeles Times, December 14, 1995. https://www.latimes.com/archives/la-xpm-1995-12-14-ca-14129-story.html.
- Ventura. “Recycled Recollections.” Ventura County Star. Ventura, October 7, 2016. https://www.vcstar.com/story/entertainment/arts/2016/10/07/recycled-recollections/91134514/.
- Yolanda González. YouTube. YouTube, 2012. https://www.youtube.com/watch?v=WgavtH8P3o4&ab_channel=LAPlazadeCulturayArtes.
