= Autonomous University of Guerrero =

Coordinates: 17.5368°N 99.4956°W

- Universidad Autónoma de Guerrero
- Type: Public
- Established: June 22, 1960
- Rector: Javier Saldaña Almazán
- Students: 25,979 (2012)
- Location: Chilpancingo, Guerrero, Mexico
- Colours: Red, gray and blue
- Mascot: Águilas
- Website: uagro.mx

The Autonomous University of Guerrero (Universidad Autónoma de Guerrero or UAGro) is a public and autonomous institution of secondary education and higher education in the Mexican state of Guerrero. Its main campus is in Chilpancingo, with facilities in Acapulco, Taxco, Iguala, Tixtla, Ometepec, Tecpan de Galeana, Altamirano and other cities in the state.

== History ==
=== Predecessors ===
Almost immediately after the foundation of Guerrero as a state in 1849, officials recognized the need to establish an institution of higher education. To this end, the Álvarez Literary Institute (Instituto Literario de Álvarez) was established by decree on June 5, 1852, to be located at Tixtla. However, the literary institute did not get off the ground for 17 years, hampered by war between liberals and conservatives. On September 11, 1869, the governor of Guerrero, General Francisco O. Arce, revived the institute, and it began operations five days later. In its early years, the Literary Institute was dogged by a lack of teachers and funding; it moved to Chilpancingo upon its designation as the state capital in 1870. A new plan of studies, released in 1885, gave the school colegio status and added several new programs. However, the state's education policy for most of the late 19th and early 20th centuries focused on creating teachers. The Instituto Literario de Varones y de Señoritas (Literary Institute for Men and Women), the first normal school in Guerrero, was founded in 1893. It changed names twice, becoming the Mixed Normal School of Guerrero in 1908. Additionally, a law school was created in Chilpancingo in 1903.

=== A new university ===
By the early 1940s, the normal school was not faring well. In response, Governor Rafael Catalán Calvo established the Colegio del Estado (State College) in April 1942. The State College's programs were modeled on those of the Instituto Politécnico Nacional, where the governor had studied, and it taught various engineering, agricultural and marine degrees. In 1950, the State College was declared a university, without a name change, and it became a member of the ANUIES, the national association of universities.

Throughout the 1950s, students at the school called for the institution's name to be changed to reflect its status, proposing the moniker Universidad del Sur (University of the South). On June 22, 1960, the state legislature promulgated a law creating the Universidad de Guerrero (University of Guerrero), which for a time included the normal and secondary schools that later were transferred to the education department. However, continued calls by students for the university's autonomy went unheeded. A 1960 student strike calling for the autonomy of the university ultimately ended in a massacre claiming nearly 20 lives and the fall of the state government under Governor Raúl Caballero Aburto.

In 1963, a new organic law was passed by the state government, granting the university autonomy.

=== Universidad-Pueblo ===
The concept of a "popular university" was brought to Guerrero by rector Rosalío Wences Reza, who served between 1972 and 1975. The model focused on the establishment of a university open to the public, with support for students from poorer economic backgrounds, as well as the creation of preparatory schools across the state and the university's support of social conflicts in Mexico and Latin America. Wences Reza alternated with other rectors, serving again from 1978 to 1981 and from 1984 to 1987. While the university grew, political considerations often clashed with educational priorities and sometimes interfered with the delivery of quality education. Local elites and the state government, alarmed by the ideological stance adopted in this era, harassed the university. This was particularly seen when the university established a radio station in 1982. Radio Universidad Autónoma de Guerrero faced constant jamming and interference, moving frequencies and even at one point to different locations in order to solve its problems.

== Campuses ==
The Universidad Autónoma de Guerrero has a presence across the state, including its main campus in the state capital of Chilpancingo and programs in major cities such as Acapulco, as well as preparatory schools in dozens of cities statewide.

== Other university operations ==
Among the university's other operations include the Club Deportivo Águilas de la Universidad Autónoma de Guerrero, a professional soccer team founded in 2015 playing in the Tercera División, and Radio Universidad Autónoma de Guerrero, a radio station on AM and FM which has broadcast since 1982 but has never had an official broadcasting permit or concession.
