= Yolanda González Hernández =

Mexican politician

- Born: 1 January 1956 (age 70); San Luis Potosí, San Luis Potosí, Mexico
- Occupation: Politician
- Political party: PRI

Yolanda Eugenia González Hernández (born 1 January 1956) is a Mexican politician affiliated with the Institutional Revolutionary Party. As of 2014 she served as Senator of the LVIII and LIX Legislatures of the Mexican Congress representing San Luis Potosí and as Deputy of the LVI Legislature. She also served as a local deputy in the LI and LIII Legislatures of the Congress of San Luis Potosí.
