= ANUIES =

Non-governmental organization

Mexican Association of Universities and Higher Education Institutions (ANUIES)
- Abbreviation: ANUIES
- Formation: 1950
- Legal status: Association
- Purpose: Educational
- Headquarters: Mexico City
- Region served: Mexico
- Members: 149 Mexican higher education institutions (2009)
- Official language: Spanish
- Executive General Secretary: Rafael López Castañares
- Main organ: General Assembly
- Website: anuies.mx

The National Association of Universities and Higher Education Institutions (Spanish: Asociación Nacional de Universidades e Instituciones de Educación Superior, ANUIES) is a non-governmental organization which includes 191 public and private higher education institutions in Mexico. The association is involved in the development of programs, plans and national policies for higher education, as well as establishing agencies aimed at fostering the development of higher education in the country.

== Members ==
Institution	Location	Control	Established	Total Students
Instituto Tecnológico de Aguascalientes (ITA)	Aguascalientes	Public	1967	
Universidad Autónoma de Aguascalientes (UAA)	Aguascalientes	Public	1974	
Universidad Politécnica de Aguascalientes (UPA)	Aguascalientes	Public	2002	
Universidad Tecnológica de Aguascalientes (UTAgs)	Aguascalientes	Public	1991	
Universidad Tecnológica del Norte de Aguascalientes (UTNA)	Rincón de Romos	Public	2000	
Centro de Enseñanza Técnica y Superior (CETYS)	Mexicali	Public	1961	
Centro de Investigación Científica y de Educación Superior de Ensenada, Baja California (CICESE)	Ensenada	Public	1973	
El Colegio de la Frontera Norte, A.C. (COLEF)	Tijuana	Public	1982	
Instituto Tecnológico de Mexicali (ITMexicali)	Mexicali	Public	1981	
Instituto Tecnológico de Tijuana (ITT)	Tijuana	Public	1971	
Universidad Autónoma de Baja California (UABC)	Mexicali	Public	1957	
Centro de Investigaciones Biológicas del Noroeste, S.C. (CIBNOR)	La Paz		1975	
Instituto Tecnológico de La Paz (ITLa Paz)	La Paz		1973	
Universidad Autónoma de Baja California Sur (UABCS)	La Paz		1975	
Instituto Tecnológico de Campeche (ITCAMP)	Campeche	Public	1977	
Universidad Autónoma de Campeche (UACam)	Campeche	Public	1957	
Universidad Autónoma del Carmen (UNACAR)	Ciudad del Carmen	Public	1967	
Instituto Tecnológico de Tuxtla Gutiérrez (ITTG)	Tuxtla Gutiérrez	Public	1972	
Universidad Autónoma de Chiapas (UNACH)	Tuxtla Gutiérrez	Public	1974	
Universidad de Ciencias y Artes de Chiapas (UNICACH)	Tuxtla Gutiérrez	Public	2000	
Universidad Politécnica de Chiapas (UPChiapas)	Suchiapa	Public	2004	
Centro de Investigación en Materiales Avanzados, S.C. (CIMAV)	Chihuahua	Public	1994	
Instituto Tecnológico de Chihuahua (ITCH)	Chihuahua	Public	1948	
Instituto Tecnológico de Chihuahua II (ITCH II)	Chihuahua	Public	1987	
Instituto Tecnológico de Ciudad Juárez (ITCJ)	Ciudad Juárez	Public	1964	
Instituto Tecnológico de Delicias (ITDel)	Ciudad Delicias	Public	1986	
Instituto Tecnológico de Parral (ITParral)	Parral	Public	1975	
Universidad Autónoma de Chihuahua (UACH)	Chihuahua	Public	1954	
Universidad Autónoma de Ciudad Juárez (UACJ)	Ciudad Juárez	Public	1973	
Instituto Tecnológico de La Laguna (ITLL)	Torreón	Public	1965	
Instituto Tecnológico de Piedras Negras (ITPN)	Piedras Negras	Public	1976	
Instituto Tecnológico de Saltillo (ITS)	Saltillo	Public	1951	
Universidad Autónoma Agraria Antonio Narro (UAAAN)	Saltillo	Public	1923	
Universidad Autónoma de Coahuila (UAdeC)	Saltillo	Public	1957	
Universidad Autónoma de La Laguna, A.C. (UAL)	Torreón	Private	1988	
Universidad Tecnológica de Coahuila (UTC)	Ramos Arizpe	Public	1995	
Instituto Tecnológico de Colima (ITCol)	Villa de Álvarez	Public	1976	
Universidad de Colima (UCol)	Colima	Public	1940	
Centro de Investigación y de Estudios Avanzados del Instituto Politécnico Nacional (CINVESTAV)	Mexico City	Public	1961	
Centro de Investigación y Docencia Económicas, A.C. (CIDE)	Mexico City	Public	1974	
Centro de Investigaciones y Estudios Superiores en Antropología Social (CIESAS)	Mexico City	Public	1980	
El Colegio de México A.C. (COLMEX)	Mexico City	Public	1940	
Escuela Nacional de Antropología e Historia (ENAH)	Mexico City	Public	1946	
Facultad Latinoamericana de Ciencias Sociales (FLACSO)	Mexico City	Public	1975	
Instituto de Investigaciones Dr. José María Luis Mora (INSTITUTO MORA)	Mexico City	Public	1981	
Instituto Nacional de Bellas Artes y Literatura (INBAL)	Mexico City	Public	1946	
Instituto Politécnico Nacional (IPN)	Mexico City	Public	1936	
Instituto Tecnológico Autónomo de México (ITAM)	Mexico City	Private	1946	
Universidad Autónoma Metropolitana (UAM)	Mexico City	Public	1973	
Universidad de las Américas, A.C., Ciudad de México (UDLA)	Mexico City	Private	1972	
Universidad del Valle de México (UVM)	Mexico City	Private	1960	
Universidad Iberoamericana, A.C. (UIA)	Mexico City	Private	1943	
Universidad Intercontinental (UIC)	Mexico City	Private	1976	
Universidad La Salle, A.C. (ULSA)	Mexico City	Private	1962	
Universidad Nacional Autónoma de México (UNAM)	Mexico City	Public	1910	
Universidad Panamericana (UP)	Mexico City	Private	1968	
Universidad Pedagógica Nacional (UPN)	Mexico City	Public	1978	
Universidad Tecnológica de México (UNITEC)	Mexico City	Private	1966	
Instituto Tecnológico de Durango (ITD)	Durango	Public	1948	
Universidad Juárez del Estado de Durango (UJED)	Durango	Public	1957	
Centro de Investigaciones en Óptica, A.C. (CIO)	León	Public	1980	
Instituto Tecnológico de Celaya (ITC)	Celaya	Public	1958	
Instituto Tecnológico de León (ITL)	León	Public	1972	
Instituto Tecnológico de Roque (ITRoque)	Celaya	Public	1926	
Instituto Tecnológico Superior de Irapuato (ITESI)	Irapuato	Public	1995	
Universidad de Celaya (UDEC)	Celaya	Private	1988	
Universidad de Guanajuato (UGto)	Guanajuato	Public	1945	
Universidad Tecnológica de León (UTLeón)	León	Public	1995	
Universidad Tecnológica del Suroeste de Guanajuato (UTSOE)	Valle de Santiago	Public	1998	
Universidad Virtual del Estado de Guanajuato (UVEG)	Purísima del Rincón	Public	2006	
Instituto Tecnológico de Acapulco (ITACAP)	Acapulco	Public	1975	
Universidad Autónoma de Guerrero (UAGro)	Chilpancingo	Public	1960	
Universidad Hipócrates (UH)	Acapulco	Private	1986	
Instituto Tecnológico de Pachuca (ITP)	Pachuca	Public	1971	
Instituto Tecnológico Latinoamericano (ITLA)	Mineral de la Reforma	Private	1992	
Instituto Tecnológico Superior de Huichapan (ITESHU)	Huichapan	Public	2000	
Instituto Tecnológico Superior del Occidente del Estado de Hidalgo (ITSOEH)	Mixquiahuala de Juárez	Public	2000	
Instituto Tecnológico Superior del Oriente del Estado de Hidalgo (ITESA)	Apan	Public	2000	
Universidad Autónoma del Estado de Hidalgo (UAEH)	Pachuca	Public	1869	
Universidad Politécnica de Tulancingo (UPT)	Tulancingo	Public	2002	
Universidad Politécnica Metropolitana de Hidalgo (UPMH)	Tolcayuca	Public	2008	
Universidad Tecnológica de Tula-Tepeji (UTTT)	Tula de Allende	Public	1992	
Centro de Enseñanza Técnica Industrial (CETI)	Guadalajara	Public	1983	
Instituto Tecnológico de Ciudad Guzmán (ITCG)	Ciudad Guzmán	Public	1972	
Instituto Tecnológico y de Estudios Superiores de Occidente, A.C. (ITESO)	Tlaquepaque	Private	1957	
Universidad Autónoma de Guadalajara (UAG)	Zapopan	Private	1935	
Universidad de Guadalajara (UDG)	Guadalajara	Public	1791	
Universidad del Valle de Atemajac (UNIVA)	Zapopan	Private	1960	
Universidad Tecnológica de Jalisco (UTJ)	Guadalajara	Public	1999	

== See also ==
- Jorge Matute Remus – founder member
