= Universidad Autónoma de San Luis Potosí =

Public university in Mexico

Coordinates: 22.1528°N 100.978°W

Autonomous University of San Luis Potosi (UASLP)
- Autonomous University of San Luis Potosi (UASLP)
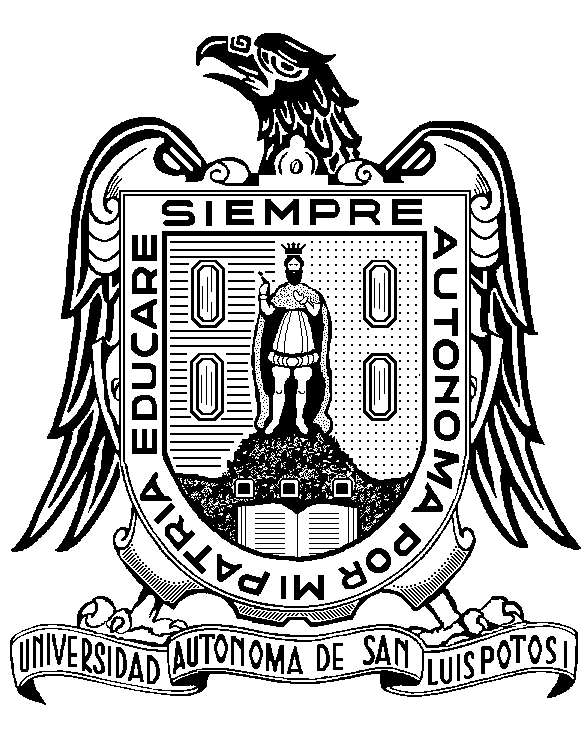
- Motto: Siempre Autónoma por Mi Patria Educaré
- Motto in English: "Always autonomous, for my fatherland's sake, I shall teach."
- Type: Public university
- Established: 1923
- Affiliations: ANUIES, CUMEX, CONAHEC
- President: Alejandro Zermeño
- Students: 32,775 (2020)
- Undergraduates: 30,823 (2020)
- Postgraduates: 1,952 (2020)
- Location: San Luis Potosí, San Luis Potosí, Mexico
- Colors: Blue and yellow
- Website: Official website

The Autonomous University of San Luis Potosí (in Spanish: Universidad Autónoma de San Luis Potosí, UASLP) is a public university in Mexico. It is the largest, oldest, and most comprehensive university in the state of San Luis Potosí, as well as one of the most important ones in Mexico. Among other historic milestones, in 1923, UASLP was the first university in Mexico to have autonomy constitutionally granted.

== History ==
The oldest antecedent of UASLP is a Jesuit college founded in 1624 in the city of San Luis Potosí to teach literacy, as well as secondary and high school studies.

In 1825, governor Ildefonso Díaz de León was directly involved in the creation of the Colegio Guadalupano Josefino. Opening on 2 June 1826, the college initially included academic programs in Humanities, Philosophy, Theology, and Law. A Medicine program was added six years later. The first rector was Manuel María de Gorriño y Arduengo. Unfortunately, teachers were not always available and due to political and civil unrest there were times, especially in the 19th century, the college had to suspend classes on a temporary basis. Also, in 1855, the Colegio was closed, in conjunction with the expulsion of Jesuits from Mexico.

In 1859, authorities and local leaders reopened the institution under the name of Scientific and Literary Institute of San Luis Potosi, as a non-denominational higher education institution. However, since this event happened at the same time that the country was experiencing the Reform War (1858-1861), activities were limited during the first years of operation.

On 10 January 1923, governor Rafael Nieto issued Decree No. 106, which established the University of San Luis Potosí. The academic structure of the new institution included the faculties of Medicine, Law, Chemistry and Business. It also included the Civil Hospital, the San Luis Potosí Public Library, the State Meteorological Observatory, and the normal school for training teachers. The 1923 Decree granted autonomy to the University.

More recently, in 1949, the Decree Number 53, under Article 100 the Political Constitution of the State of San Luis Potosí, changed the name of the institution into its current one of Autonomous University of San Luis Potosí.

== Organization ==
UASLP is organized in faculties (schools that offer postgraduate education), schools, coordinations, academic units and departments; it is divided into 15 faculties, 1 school, 4 coordinations, 1 department, 7 institutes, 12 research institutes, and 2 academic units for different and specific areas. Both undergraduate and graduate studies are available on each faculty. To date, UASLP has a student population of more than 32,000 people, and offers 99 undergraduate programs and 88 postgraduate programs.

=== Faculties ===
- Faculty of Accounting and Administration
- Faculty of Agronomy and Veterinary
- Faculty of Chemical Sciences
- Faculty of Communication Sciences
- Faculty of Economics
- Faculty of Engineering
- Faculty of Humanities and Social Sciences
- Faculty of Information Sciences
- Faculty of Law
- Faculty of Medicine
- Faculty of Nursing and Nutrition
- Faculty of Psychology
- Faculty of Sciences
- Faculty of Stomatology
- Faculty of the Habitat (for architecture, design and building related studies)
- Faculty of Professional Studies Huasteca Zone (Ciudad Valles)

=== Schools ===
- High School of Matehuala

=== Coordinations ===
- Academic Coordination, Altiplano Region (Matehuala)
- Academic Coordination, Huasteca South Region
- Academic Coordination, West Altiplano Region
- Academic Coordination in Arts

=== Departments ===
- Department of Mathematical Physics

=== Academic units ===
- Multidisciplinary Academic Unit, Media Region (Rio Verde)

=== Institutes ===
- Institute of Education Sciences
- Institute of Physics
- Institute of Geology
- Institute of Optical Communication Research (IICO)
- Humanistic Research Institute
- Desert Zones Research Institute
- Institute of Metallurgy

=== Research centers ===
- Research Center in Health Sciences and Biomedicine
- Research and Extension Center "El Balandrán"
- Biosciences Regional Center
- Coordination for the Innovation and Application of Science and Technology
- Research and Postgraduate Studies Center of the Faculty of Chemistry
- Research and Postgraduate Studies Center of the Faculty of Engineering
- Research and Postgraduate Studies Center of the Faculty of the Habitat
- Stomatology Research Center
- Integral Care Unit and Health Research
- Research and Postgraduate Studies Center in Agricultural Sciences
- Department of Research and Postgraduate Studies of the Faculty of Psychology
- Institute of Juridical Research

== Notable alumni ==
- Ponciano Arriaga (1811–1863), lawyer and Constitutional Congressman.
- Manuel José Othón (1858–1906), poet
- Primo Feliciano Velázquez, historian
- Luis Ernesto Derbez (1947-), Mexico's Secretary of Foreign Affairs 2003-2006
- Dos Caras Jr. (1977-), professional wrestler otherwise known as Alberto Del Rio and nephew of Mil Mascaras.

== Notable staff ==
- Salvador Nava Martínez (1914-1992), physician, politician and activist, professor in the School of Medicine
- Valentin Afraimovich (1945-2018), Russian and Mexican mathematician that made contributions to dynamical systems theory

== See also ==
- City University of Seattle (institutional partner)
- List of Jesuit sites
