= Polytechnic University of San Luis Potosí =

Polytechnic University of San Luis Potosí (UPSLP)
- Universidad Politécnica de San Luis Potosí
- Motto: Ciencia, Tecnología y Cultura al Servicio del Ser Humano
- Type: Public university
- Established: 2001
- President: Francisco Javier Delgado Rojas
- Location: San Luis Potosí, San Luis Potosí, Mexico; 22°07′19″N 100°59′04″W
- Campus: San Luis Potosí
- Website: www.upslp.edu.mx

The Polytechnic University of San Luis Potosí (in Spanish: Universidad Politécnica de San Luis Potosí, UPSLP) was created on 27 June 2001 and was the first Polytechnic University of the Subsystem of Polytechnic Universities.

Besides the academic programs, the university offers a series of professional certifications, such as: The FCE by University of Cambridge, the MOS certification by Microsoft, and other certifications offered by Cisco Systems, or Sun Microsystems.

The campus of the university was built using a Project for Rendering of Services (PPS in Spanish); being the first higher education institution in Mexico created under this modality. Acciona is the company in charge of rendering the services until 2027.

== Academic model ==
The university is founded on a flexible model that offers student different exit points during their studies. A student can complete a "Professional Associate" degree after two years, a "University Technician" program after three years and a bachelor's degree after four-and-a-half years. The model also offers a tutorial program, for which each student is closely supervised by the faculty.

== Undergraduate programs ==
Unlike the rest of the universities of the sub-system, the UPSLP offers all its program in nine semesters (4.5 years).

The university offers six programs:

- Information Technology Engineering
- Telematics Engineering
- Manufacturing Technology Engineering
- Systems and Industrial Technology Engineering
- International Marketing
- Administration and Management

== Academic Division ==
The academic vice-provost is the highest academic position of the university and reports directly to the president/provost of the university. There are three divisions that oversee the academic development of the university:

- Division of Administration and Humanities
- Division of New Technologies
- Division of Manufacturing and Basic Sciences

These three divisions report to the vice-provost and are in charge of the undergraduate programs. In a micro-level, the university is divided into "academies". Each academy is in charge of offering the lectures for the undergraduate program. The academies report to head of division. The academies are

- Mathematics
- Sciences
- English
- Humanities
- Computing
- Marketing
- Management and Administration
- Manufacturing and Industrial Systems

However, since its conception, the positions of head of the Divisions of New Technologies and Manufacturing and Basic Sciences are vacant, as well as those of undergraduate program coordinators.
