= San Luis Potosí (city) =

- City
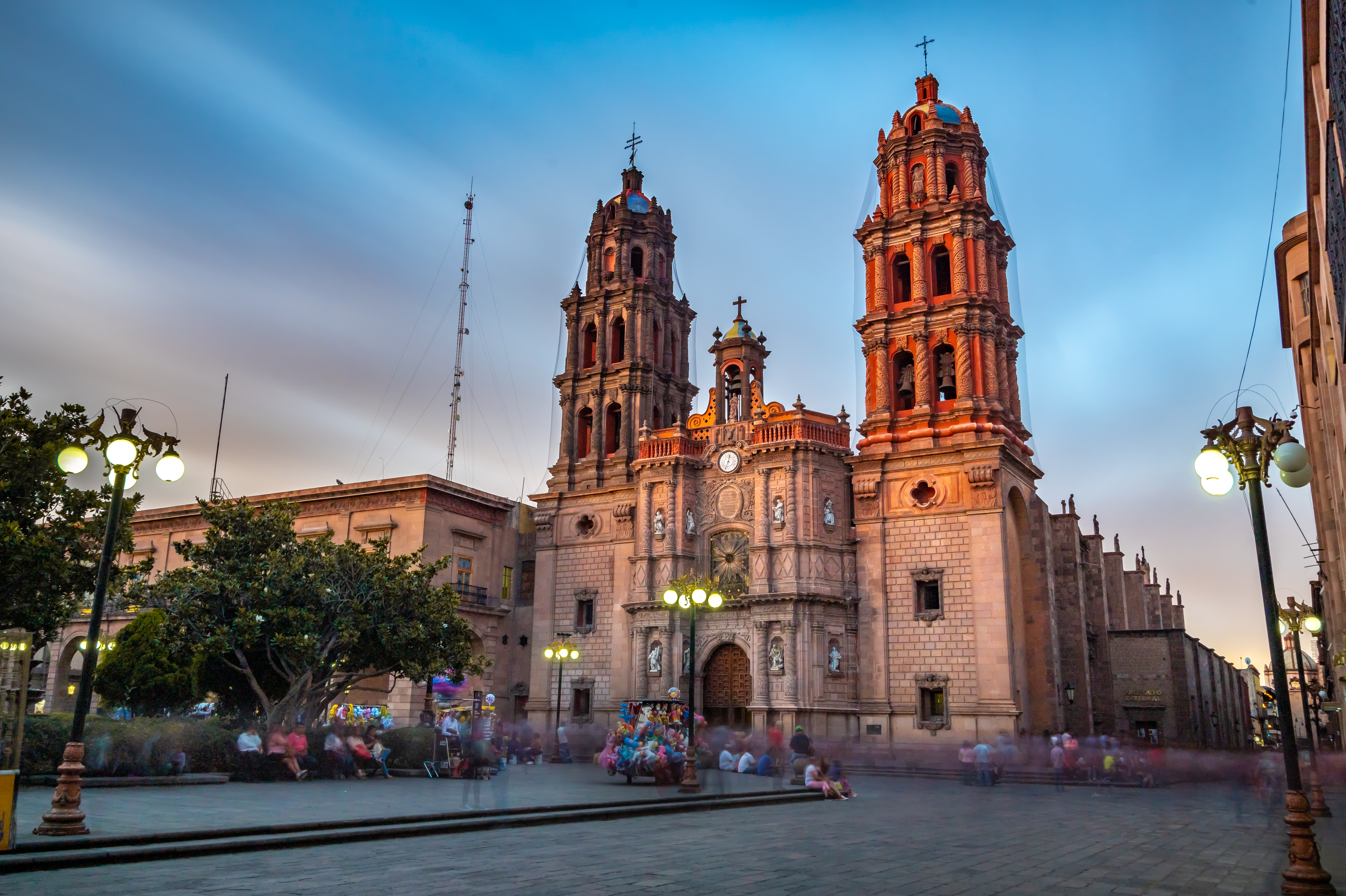
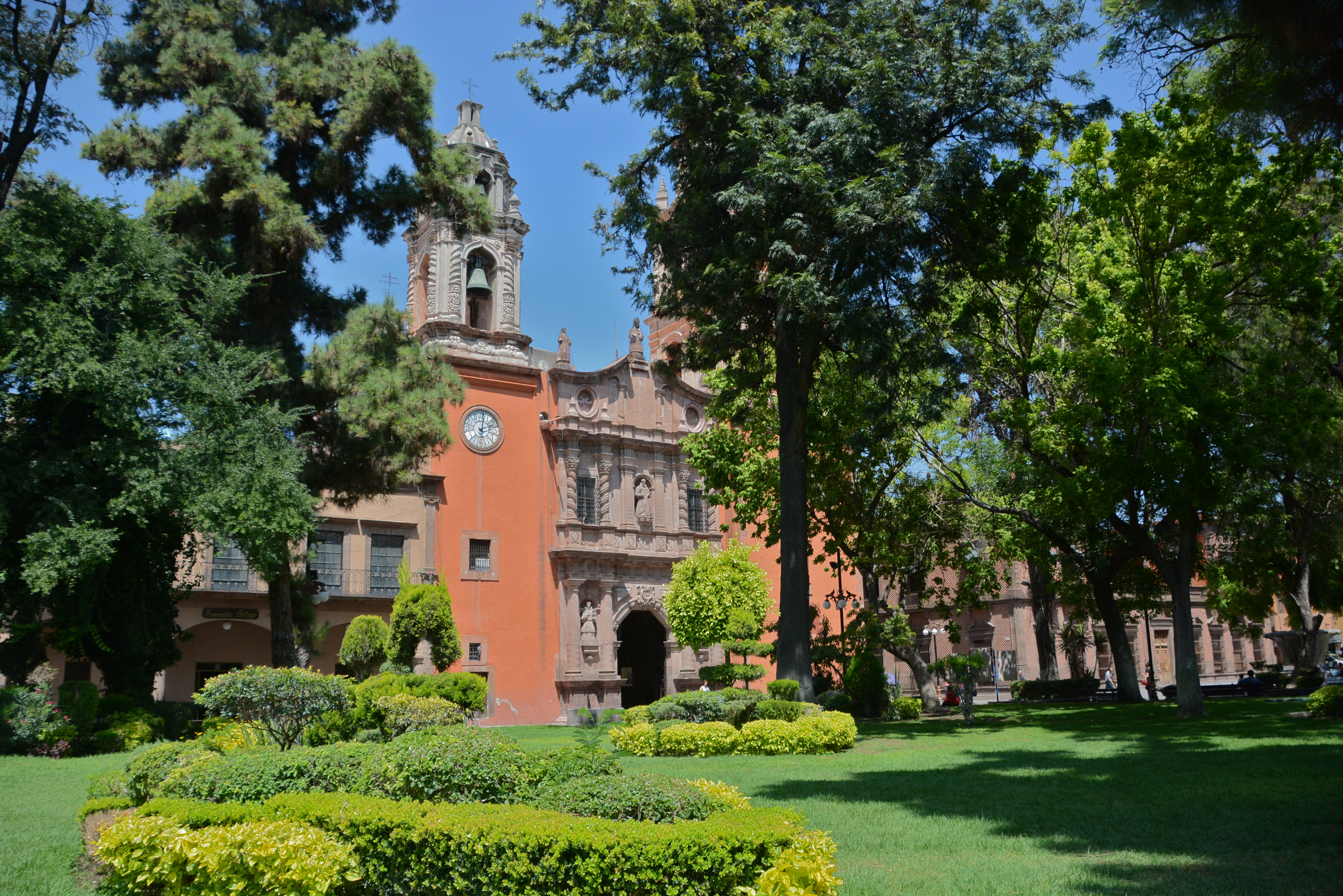
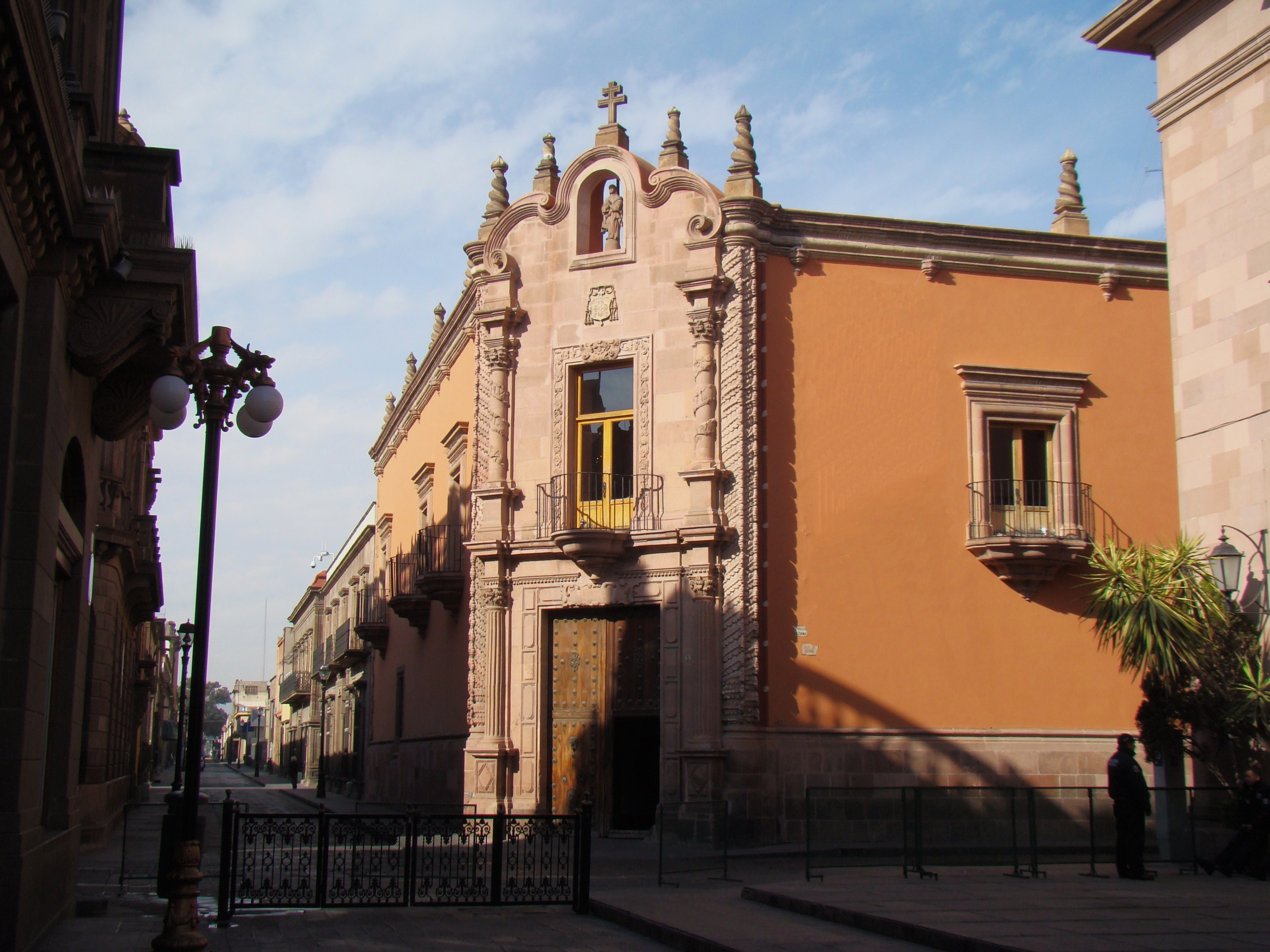
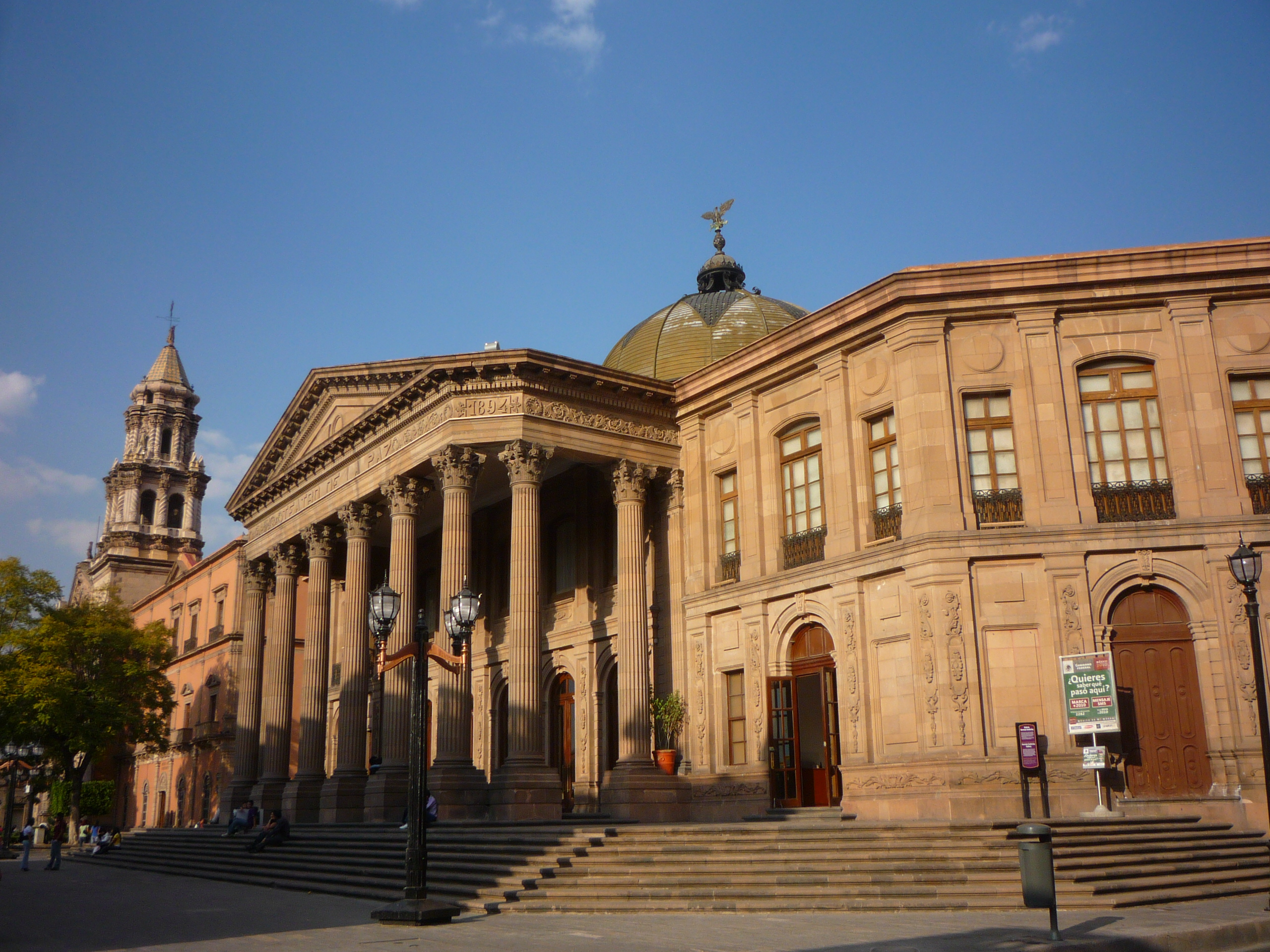
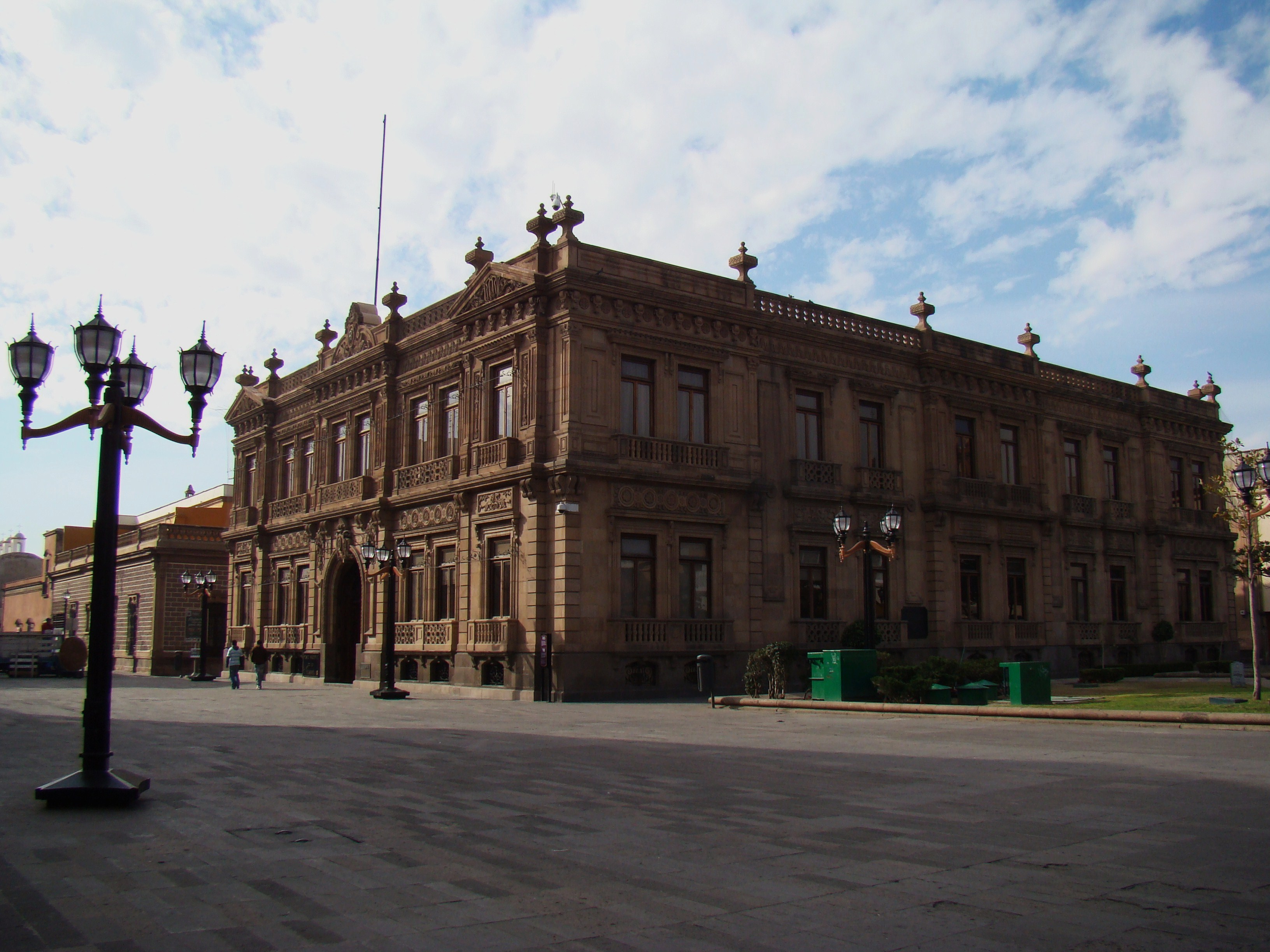
- San Luis Potosí Cathedral Jardín de San Francisco Caja Real Teatro de la Paz Museo Nacional de la Máscara San Luis Potosí skyline

- Coat of arms
- Nickname: La Ciudad de los Jardines (City of Gardens)
- Location within San Luis Potosí Location within Mexico
- Coordinates: 22°9′4″N 100°58′34″W
- Country: Mexico
- State: San Luis Potosí
- Founded: November 3, 1592
- Founded as: Pueblo de San Luis Mesquitique
- Named for: Louis IX of France and Potosí, Bolivia

Government
  - Mayor: Enrique Francisco Galindo Ceballos

Area
  - Municipality: 385 km^{2} (149 sq mi)
- Elevation: 1,864 m (6,115 ft)

Population (2015)
  - Municipality: 824,229
  - Density: 2,140/km^{2} (5,500/sq mi)
  - Metro: 1,221,526
  - Demonym: Potosino (a)

GDP (PPP, constant 2015 values)
  - Year: 2023
  - Total: $35.8 billion
  - Per capita: $28,300
- Time zone: UTC–06:00 (Zona Centro)
- Postal code: 78000 (Center)
- Website: ayuntamientoslp.gob.mx

San Luis Potosí, commonly referred to as San Luis, or by its initials SLP (Otomi: Nmiñ'u), is the capital and largest city of the Mexican state of San Luis Potosí. It is the municipal seat of the surrounding municipality of San Luis Potosí. The city lies at an elevation of 1,864 metres (6,115 feet). It has an estimated population of 845,941 in the city proper as of the 2020 census, making it Mexico’s 19th-most-populous city. The metropolitan area’s population was 1,221,526, formed with the neighbour city of Soledad de Graciano Sánchez, and other surrounding municipalities, which makes the metropolitan area of Greater San Luis Potosí the 12th-most-populous in Mexico.

The city is in the west-central part of the state of San Luis Potosí, at 22.16°N, 100.98°W. The municipality has an area of 1,443.14 square kilometres (557.20 square miles). It is part of the macroregion of Bajío.

The city is named after Louis IX of France (also known in Mexico as San Luis Rey de Francia, Saint Louis, King of France), who is the city's patron saint. Potosí was added in reference to the fabulously rich mines of Potosí, Bolivia, discovered some forty years before the city was founded, as the exploitation of silver and gold mines in Cerro de San Pedro, near San Luis, was the main reason for the founding of the city in 1592.

Currently the city is one of the main industrial centers in central Mexico with a prolific manufacturing industry. A number of foreign industries have chosen to invest in San Luis Potosí in the last decades thanks to its strategic location for trade, as the city is located halfway between Mexico City and the United States border, as well as in the middle of the triangle formed by the three largest cities in Mexico: Mexico City, Guadalajara, and Monterrey.

Besides its industrial economy, recently the city has been promoted as a touristic destination in central Mexico by state and federal programs. San Luis Potosí's historic center displays a remarkable mixture of different artistic styles in many buildings and is a major example of colonial architecture in Mexico. In 2010, the historic center was listed as a UNESCO World Heritage Site within Camino Real de Tierra Adentro.

== History ==
=== Pre-colonial period ===
In pre-Hispanic times, the territory now occupied by the state of San Luis Potosí included two cultural areas: Mesoamerica and Aridoamerica. While the southern and eastern regions of the state were occupied by Otomi and Huastec kingdoms, its northern and central-west regions, where the city of San Luis now is located, were inhabited by Chichimeca. Chichimeca is a generic term given to various nomadic ethnicities which inhabited the northern fringes of the Aztec Empire, which is now northern Mexico. As they were nomadic peoples, they did not build large cities nor have permanent settlements like most Mesoamerican civilizations. They are described by historians as very warlike peoples, living in continual wars among themselves. These tribes spoke different languages but their customs were similar.

After the arrival of Spanish conquistadores and their Indigenous allies into the territory now formed by the Mexican nation, it still took them about a century to colonize the northern territories in Aridoamerica. When the settlers founded the first settlements in the region in late 16th century, they had to struggle against constant attacks from Guachichil tribes. Extremely resistant, these tribes attacked traders who traveled to Zacatecas in newly created routes. Conquistadores and religious missionaries called the place where San Luis now is located "El Gran Tunal" (Grand Place of Tuna fruit). Finally, in 1589, peace between Chichimeca peoples and Spanish settlers was reached thanks to efforts made by Miguel Caldera and Brother Diego de la Magdalena, which marked the end of the Chichimeca War.

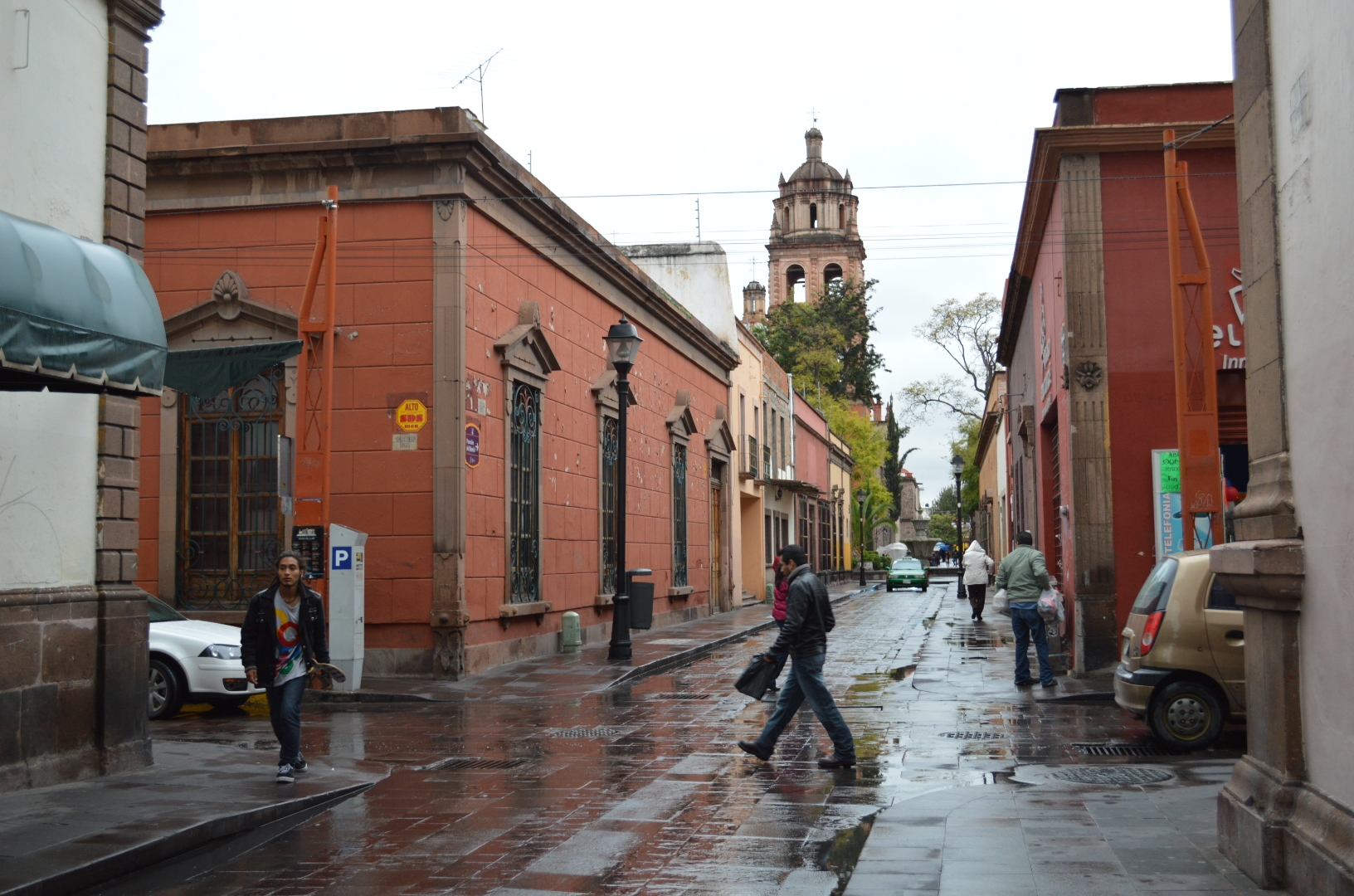
Universidad St.

=== Colonial period ===
A Franciscan mission was established in the zone in 1583, nine years before the city's founding. In early 1592 the mines of Cerro de San Pedro were discovered. The lack of water in Cerro de San Pedro made impossible a new settlement in that specific area, as well as the proper exploitation of the minerals. A short distance away there was a valley where water was abundant. This originated the creation of a new township to facilitate the labors of mining extraction.

The legal foundation of the town of San Luis Potosí was made in November 3, 1592 as part of the Viceroyalty of New Spain, according to a charter commission raised by Viceroy Luís de Velasco and given to Miguel Caldera (considered the historic founder of the city) and Juan de Oñate.

In 1786, San Luis Potosí became the capital of the Intendancy of San Luis Potosí, one of the twelve new administrative units of the Viceroyalty of New Spain created as part of the Bourbon reforms.

=== Independence ===
For a time in 1863, during the French invasion of Mexico, San Luis Potosí served as the capital of the republican government, under President Benito Juárez.

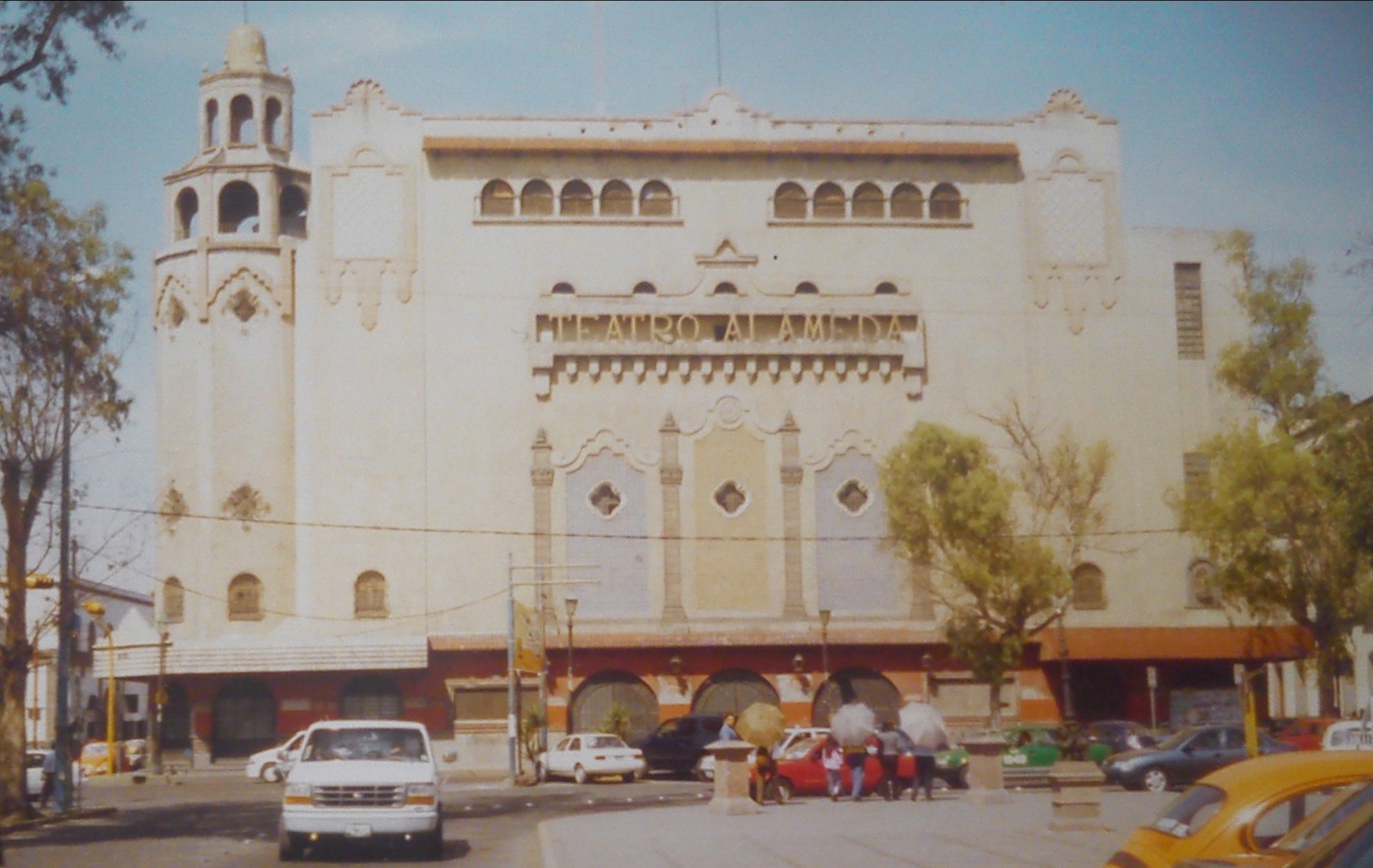
Alameda Theater in the city of San Luis Potosí

The Plan of San Luis Potosí, issued November 20, 1910, was the opening shot of Mexico's revolution against the dictator Porfirio Díaz. The 1910 presidential election was stolen when Díaz had his opponent Francisco I. Madero arrested and imprisoned. Madero fled and issued the Plan of San Luis Potosí, declaring the election void and calling upon Mexicans to take up arms against the government.

Today, the downtown is one of plazas and colonial architecture. The "Plaza de Armas" is the site of a cathedral and governor's palace (1770). The nearby "Templo de Nuestra Señora del Carmen," with its colorful tiled domes and famous altars, is considered among Mexico's finest churches; it was founded in 1749 by Fray Nicolás de Jesús María. In addition, San Luis is home to the bullring Plaza de Toros Fermin Rivera.

Outside the center, a modern industrial city has begun to grow.

The Universidad Autónoma de San Luis Potosí (UASLP) is in the city. Based on a Jesuit College founded in 1624, the Instituto Científico y Literario was raised to the category of a university in 1923, and is recognized as one of Latin America's best universities.

=== Today ===
With a population of approximately one million inhabitants, it is now the twelfth largest metropolitan area in Mexico. The city is a major commercial and industrial center. It lies in an economically advantageous area at the heart of the "triangle" formed by the three largest cities in Mexico: Mexico City, Guadalajara and Monterrey.

In recent years, the city has attracted the attention of European and American investors; its political, social, and economic stability has convinced large multinational companies to assume a presence there and to buy land, on the outskirts of the city.

Recently, according to a survey conducted by the magazine The Investor, San Luis Potosí and its metropolitan area was the third-best place to live in Mexico.

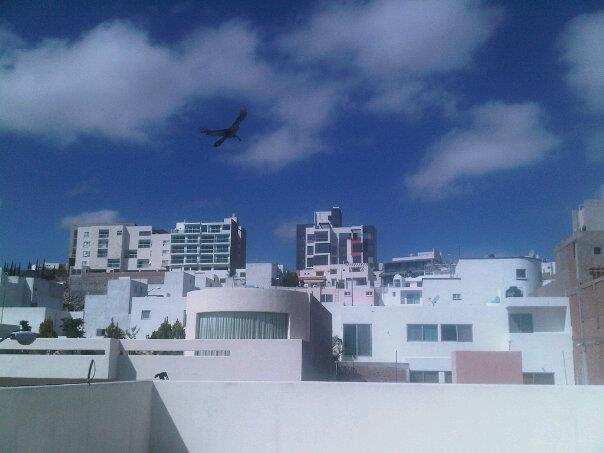
The city has experienced one of the fastest increases in demand for housing.

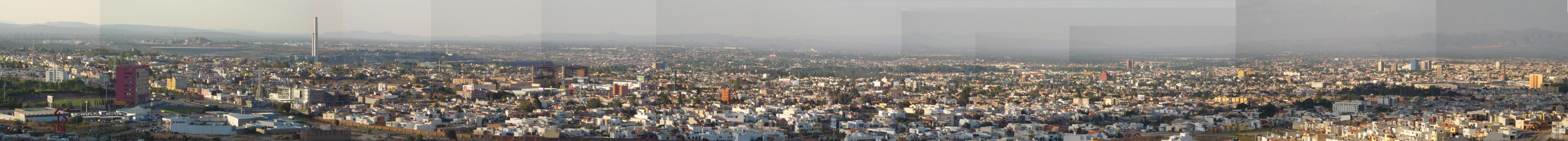
Panorama of the city (2007)

Historic centre of the city of San Luis Potosí (In process of evaluation)
UNESCO World Heritage Site
- Interactive map of Historic centre of the city of San Luis Potosí (In process of evaluation)
- Part of: Camino Real de Tierra Adentro
- Criteria: Cultural: II, IV
- Reference: 1351-039
- Inscription: 2010 (34th Session)
- Area: 70.34 ha (173.8 acres)
- Buffer zone: 133.49 ha (329.9 acres)

== Geography ==
=== Climate ===
San Luis Potosí features a cold semi-arid climate (BSk) under the Köppen climate classification. Its high altitude means that the city experiences only a handful of hot days each year. While the climate exhibits noticeably cooler (January and February) and warmer periods (April and May) of the year, temperatures are relatively consistent throughout the course of the year. San Luis Potosí receives, on average, 392.1 mm (15.44 in) of precipitation annually, mostly seen from May through October. Snowfall is a rare occurrence in the city downtown, even though it is not uncommon in the city outskirts and in the highest parts of the greater San Luis Potosí area to get reports of frost and some snow during the winter.

The last recorded snowfalls occurred in January 1967, December 13, 1997, December 2011, March 2016, and December 8, 2017.

Climate data for San Luis Potosí (1951–2010, extremes 1949–present)
Month	Jan	Feb	Mar	Apr	May	Jun	Jul	Aug	Sep	Oct	Nov	Dec	Year
Record high °C (°F)	35.0 (95.0)	35.6 (96.1)	35.8 (96.4)	37.5 (99.5)	39.8 (103.6)	43.2 (109.8)	34.5 (94.1)	35.8 (96.4)	34.9 (94.8)	34.2 (93.6)	31.8 (89.2)	29.5 (85.1)	43.2 (109.8)
Mean daily maximum °C (°F)	20.6 (69.1)	22.5 (72.5)	25.4 (77.7)	27.7 (81.9)	28.4 (83.1)	26.7 (80.1)	24.8 (76.6)	25.0 (77.0)	23.8 (74.8)	23.2 (73.8)	22.4 (72.3)	20.7 (69.3)	24.3 (75.7)
Daily mean °C (°F)	13.0 (55.4)	14.7 (58.5)	17.4 (63.3)	19.8 (67.6)	21.0 (69.8)	20.4 (68.7)	19.1 (66.4)	19.2 (66.6)	18.3 (64.9)	17.0 (62.6)	15.3 (59.5)	13.6 (56.5)	17.4 (63.3)
Mean daily minimum °C (°F)	5.5 (41.9)	6.8 (44.2)	9.3 (48.7)	11.9 (53.4)	13.7 (56.7)	14.1 (57.4)	13.4 (56.1)	13.4 (56.1)	12.9 (55.2)	10.8 (51.4)	8.2 (46.8)	6.4 (43.5)	10.5 (50.9)
Record low °C (°F)	−8.0 (17.6)	−6.5 (20.3)	−3.0 (26.6)	−3.4 (25.9)	1.0 (33.8)	6.0 (42.8)	1.5 (34.7)	4.7 (40.5)	1.0 (33.8)	0.7 (33.3)	−3.0 (26.6)	−11.0 (12.2)	−11.0 (12.2)
Average precipitation mm (inches)	13.6 (0.54)	7.9 (0.31)	6.4 (0.25)	19.6 (0.77)	38.2 (1.50)	64.3 (2.53)	66.6 (2.62)	58.6 (2.31)	65.2 (2.57)	30.7 (1.21)	11.2 (0.44)	9.8 (0.39)	392.1 (15.44)
Average precipitation days (≥ 0.1 mm)	2.2	1.6	1.5	2.9	5.6	7.4	7.9	7.0	8.4	5.0	1.8	1.9	53.2
Average relative humidity (%)	58.6	53.2	45.6	46.9	53.2	62.0	67.9	66.9	70.2	66.7	61.5	59.7	59.4
Mean monthly sunshine hours	215.7	229.0	268.8	258.6	284.2	260.3	244.4	251.6	193.5	219.8	227.3	218.5	2,871.7
Source 1: Servicio Meteorológico Nacional
Source 2: NOAA (relative humidity and sun 1981–2010), Meteomanz(extremes since 2018)

== Local cuisine ==
Potosinos (as residents of the city are referred to) are proud of their bright orange enchiladas potosinas, often served with refried beans and guacamole.

The nearby town of Santa María del Río provides the state with its sparkling mineral water, Agua de Lourdes. The water fills both store shelves and the cocktails of Potosinos, who claim the water can cure a hangover.

== Important buildings ==
Besides having hundreds of classically designed buildings, the city is also home to some of the most modern buildings in Mexico.

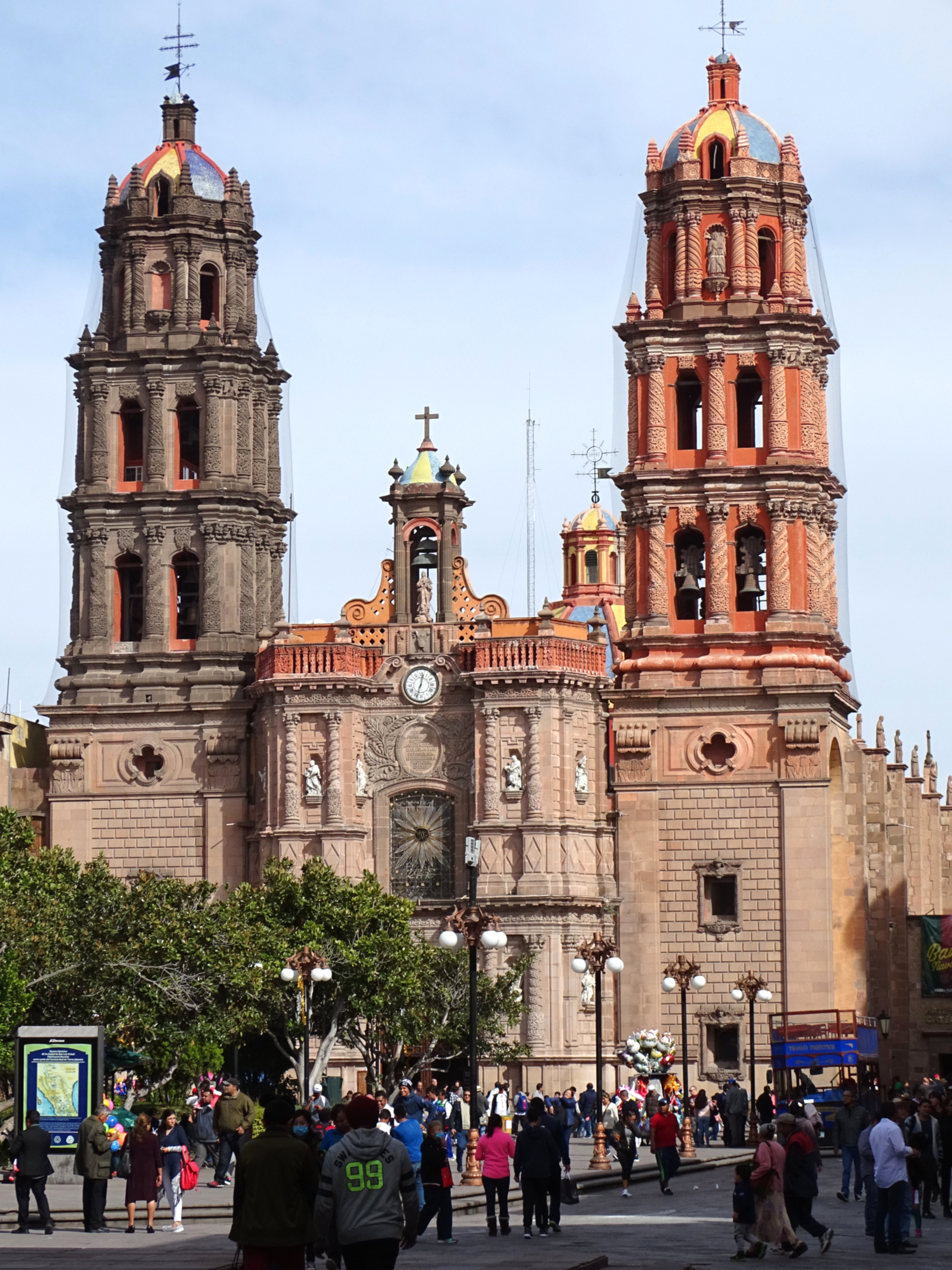
Metropolitan Cathedral of San Luis Potosí

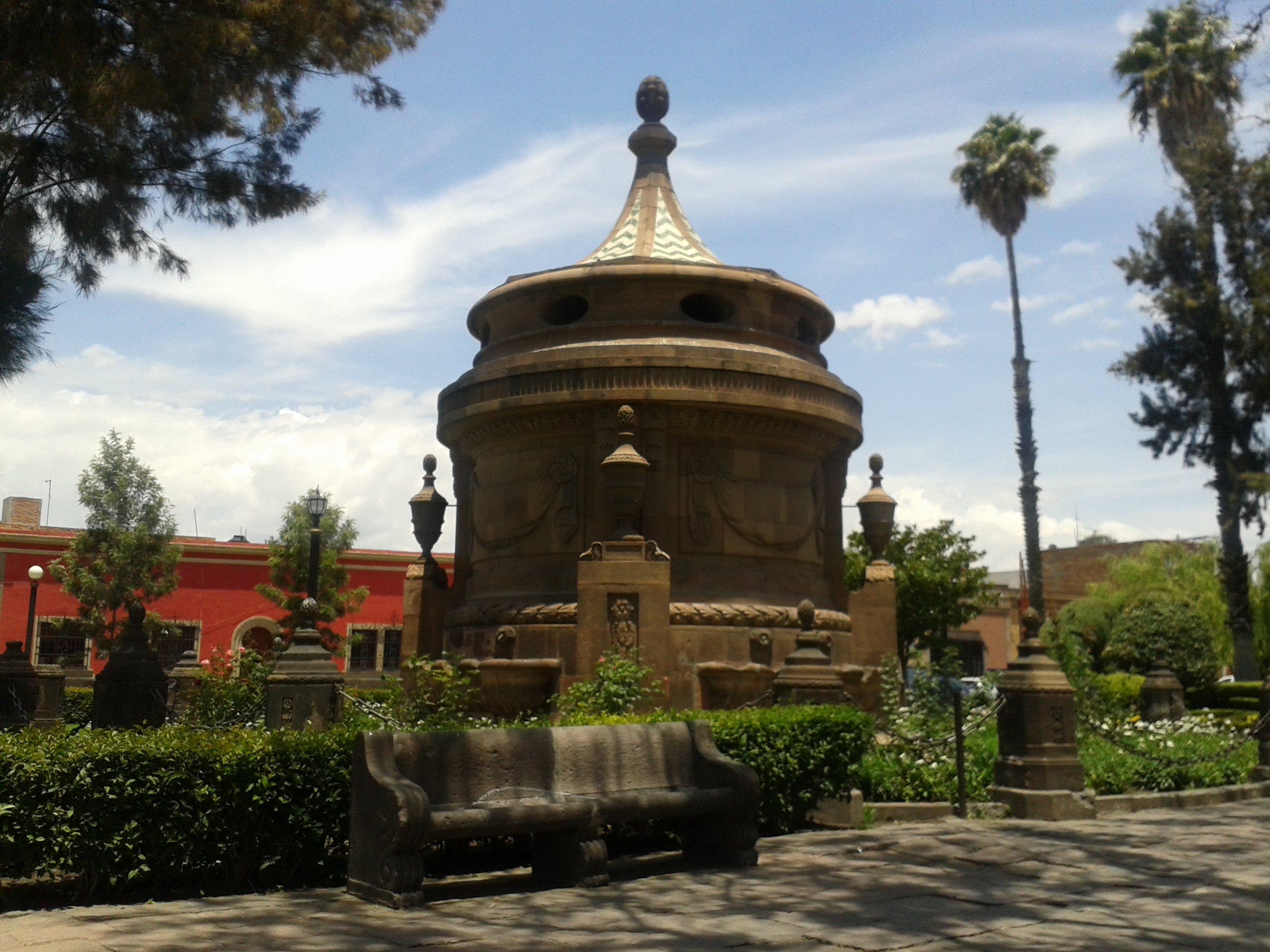
Caja de Agua

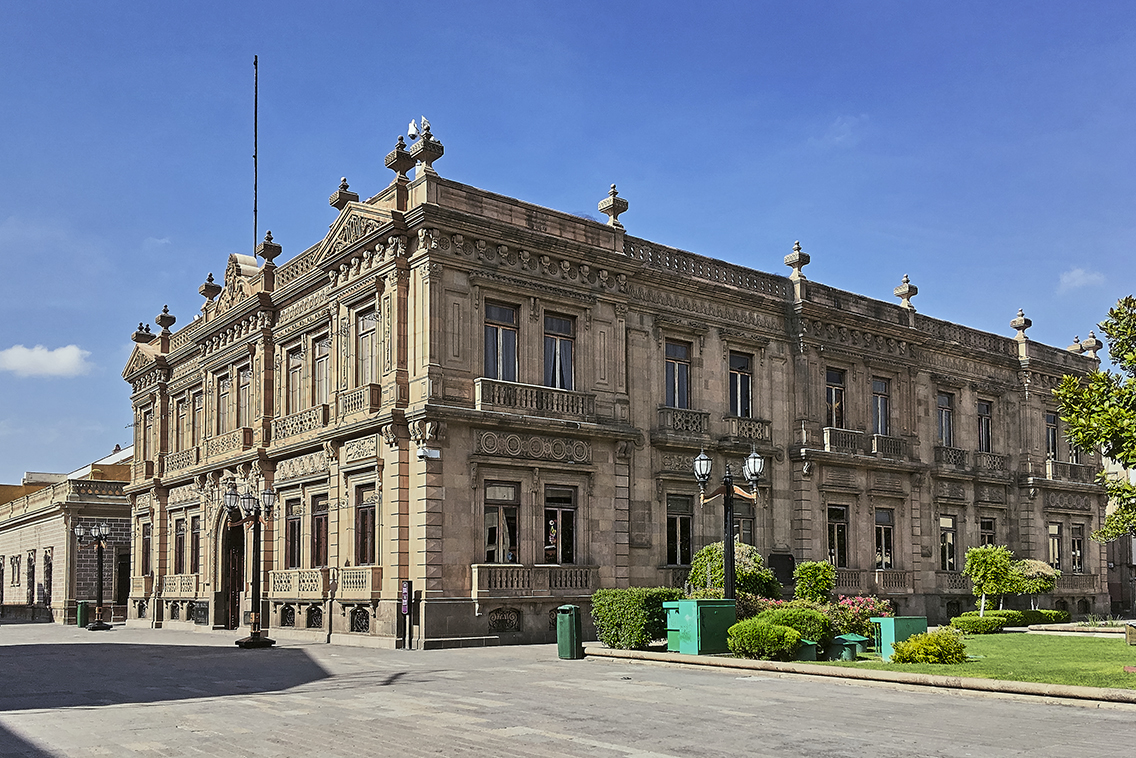
National Museum of the Mask

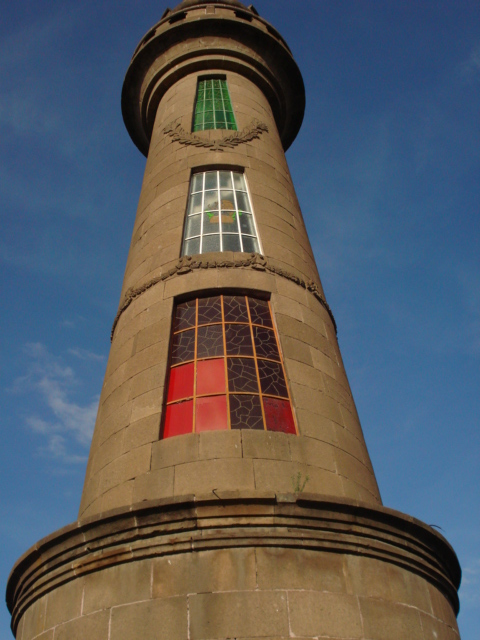
Monument to the Flag

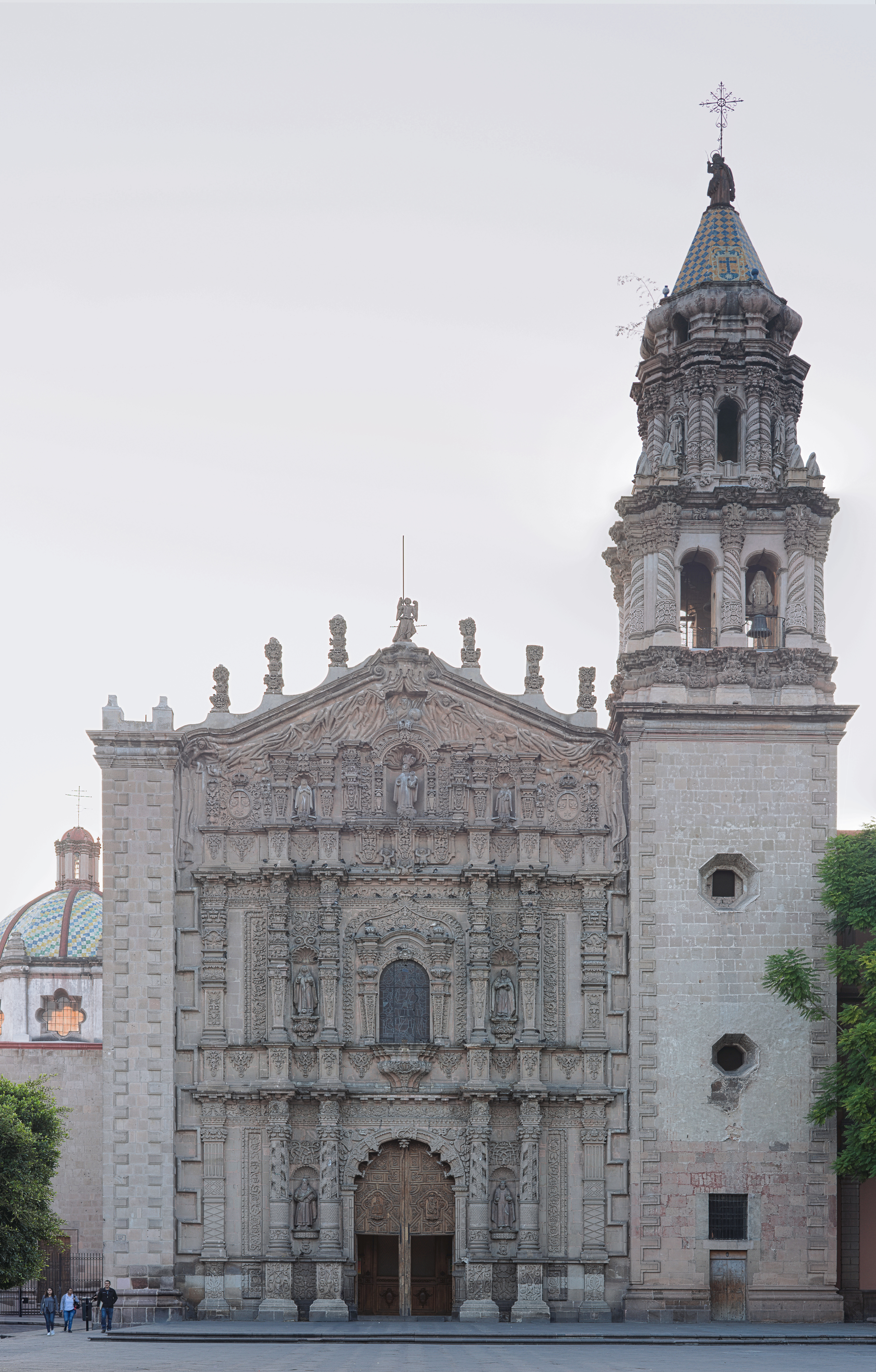
Nuestra Señora del Carmen

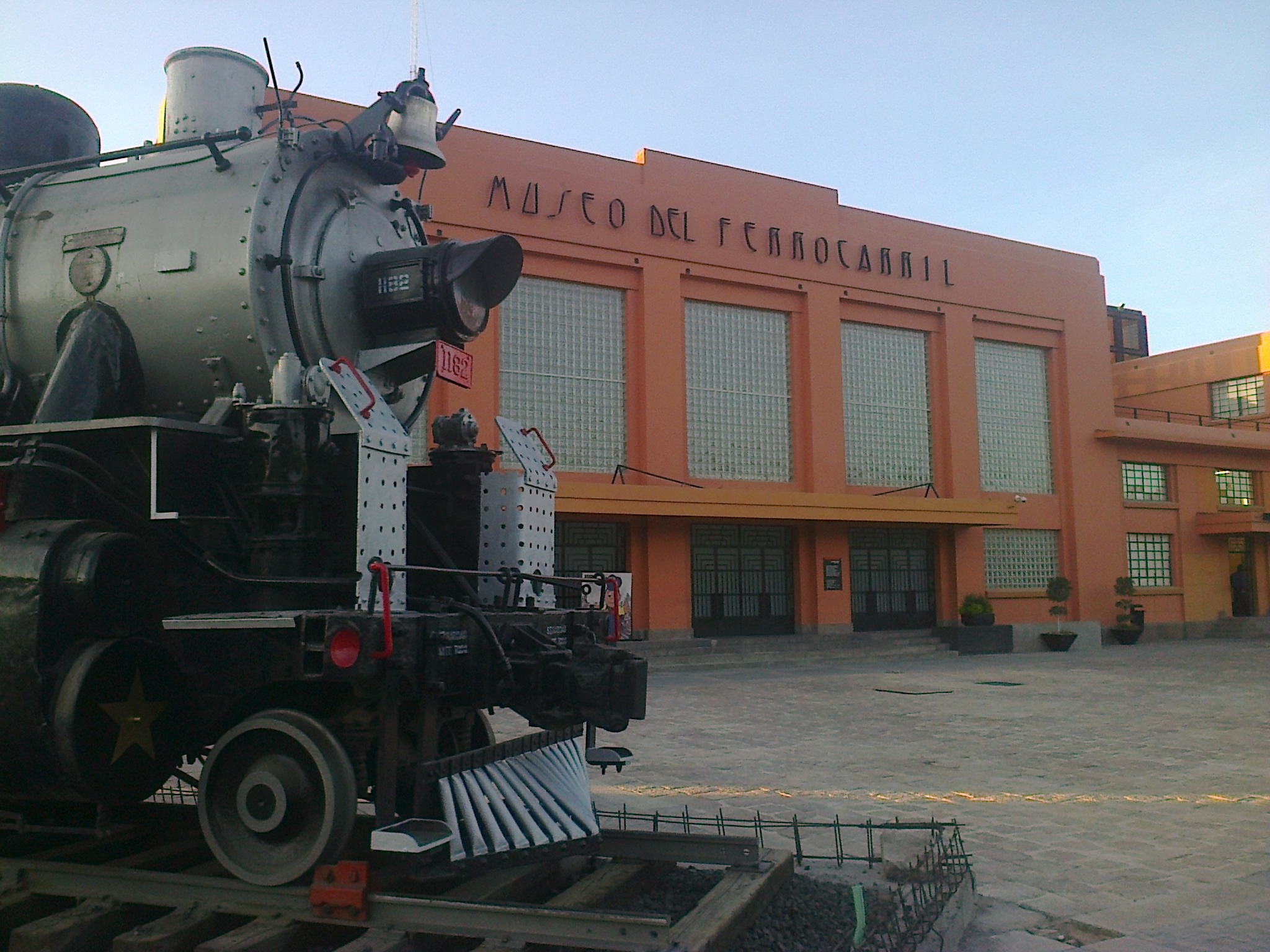
Railway Museum

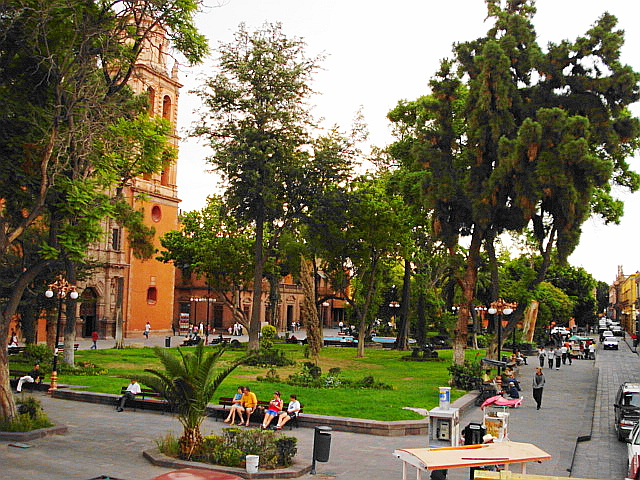
San Francisco Garden

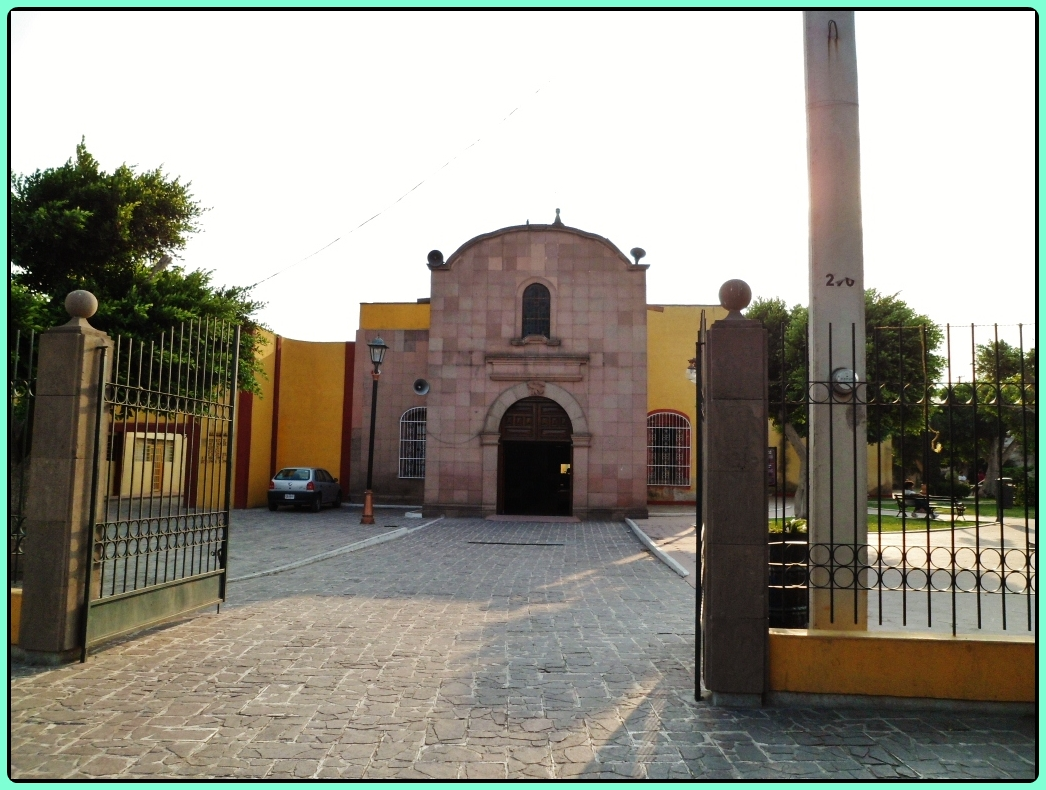
San Cristobal del Montecillo Temple

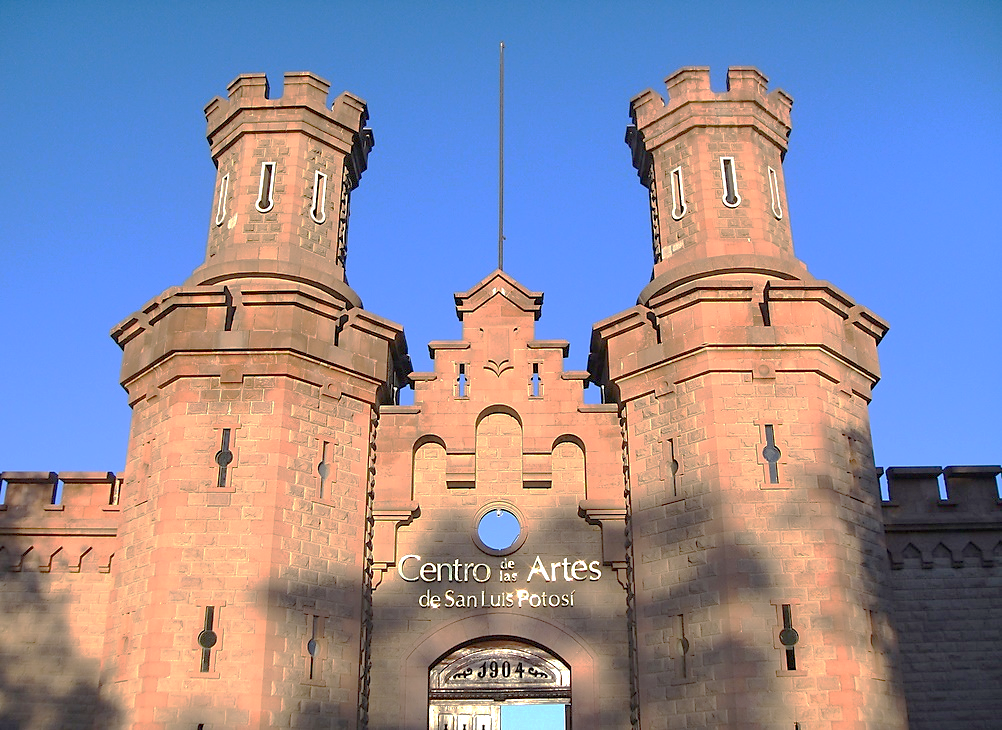
Centro de las Artes de San Luis Potosí Centenario

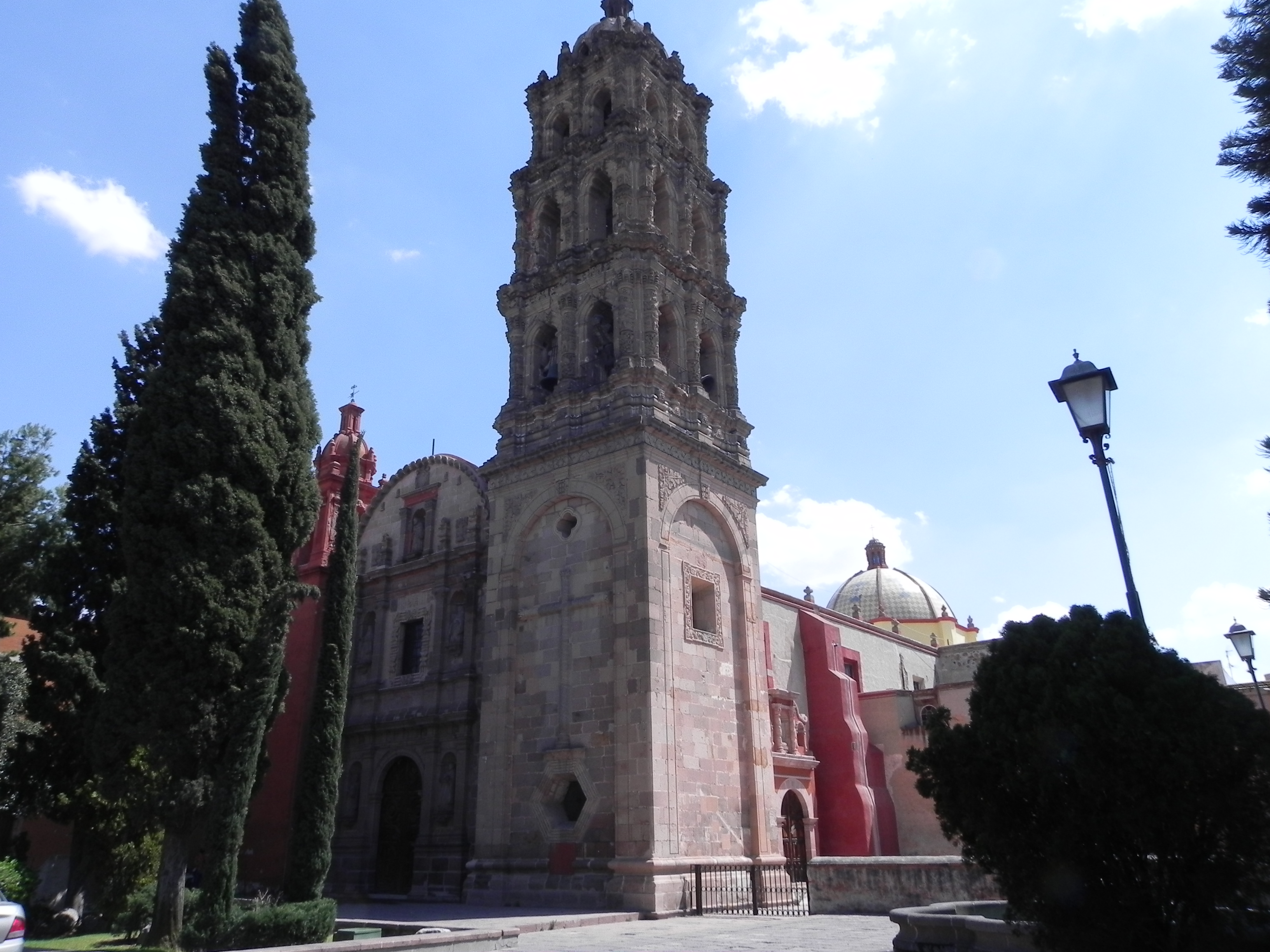
San Agustín Church

In recent years the city has faced a boom in the construction of buildings and museums. Among the most prominent are the Laberinto Museum of Science and Arts, which was an investment of more than $200 million pesos, in 9000 m^{2} of land in the Tangamanga I Park. The project was designed by architect Ricardo Legorreta and promoted by the governor of San Luis Potosí, Marcelo de los Santos Fraga. It is a museum of aesthetic proportions similar to that of the Papalote Museum of Children in Mexico City, with the addition that the materials used in its construction, especially the quarry, make it a real Potosino manufacturing building. The floor of the museum occupies a total of 6.5 ha, which have gardens with species endemic to the region and a central source. Its interior is divided into a total of six rooms arranged in galleries. Their proportions will allow visitors to make an interactive tour that will switch themes of the art museum with samples of science and technology.

Currently, the two tallest buildings in the city are the EME Building and the Muniz Werger Building. The EME Building was built in 1988 and measures 64 m to the top floor, with the spiral 75 m, with the antenna 98 meters. It has 17 floors, with 10 levels of parking at the street for a capacity of 1500 cars, and it houses mixed offices. The Muniz Werger Building, which measures 58 m for the top floor, 65 m with the spiral, and 80 m with the antenna, has 15 storeys and two elevators. Its construction began in 1991 and finished in 1993, and it is considered the most modern building in the city.

There are currently two buildings under construction and five buildings in the project. Corporate Tangamanga, which measured 41 m, will have 14 floors; its construction began in 2005 and will end in 2008. This building houses offices and mixed Star Medical Tower, 40 m and will have 8 floors.

== Economy ==
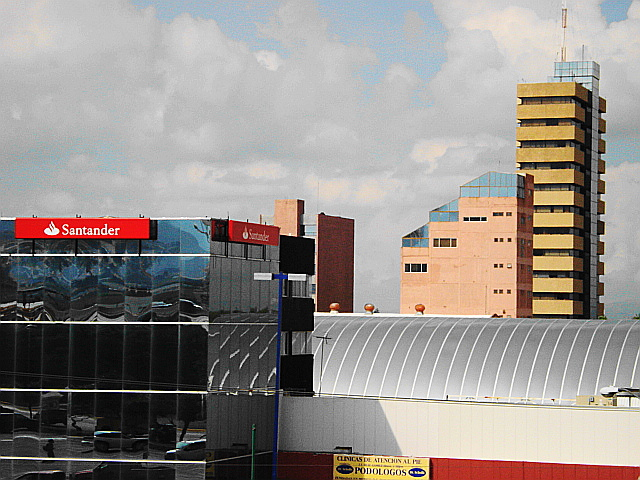
Commercial office buildings in San Luis Potosí

The principal commercial centers of the city are Plaza Tangamanga, Plaza el Dorado, Plaza Sendero, Plaza Citadella, Plaza San Luis, and The Park.

In the city, various banks operate such as BBVA Bancomer, Banamex, HSBC, Banorte, Santander Group, Actinver, Scotiabank, and BanRegio.

In June 2019, BMW Group inaugurated a 300 hectare (741 acre) automotive plant in the industrial zone of San Luis Potosí. The plants employs over 3,000 people and has received over US$2 billion in investments.

The city's industrial zone (zona industrial) is home to numerous industrial parks, factories, and warehouses and is one of the largest and most economically productive industrial zones in Mexico. The industrial zone alone accounts for 30% of total GDP of the state of San Luis Potosí, being home to over 180,000 employees and over 600 companies. The Logistik Industrial Park is considered to be the largest industrial park in Mexico.

== Transportation ==
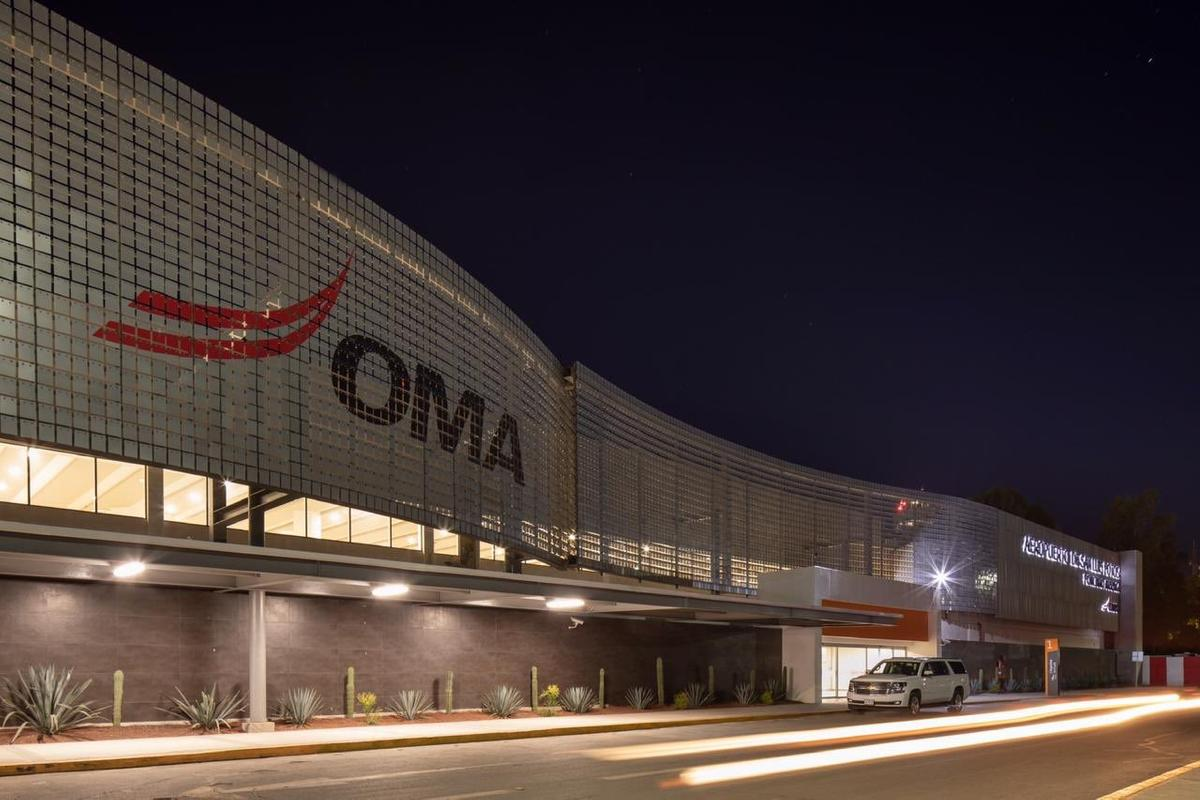
Ponciano Arriaga International Airport

=== Air ===
Ponciano Arriaga International Airport is the city's primary airport. It is around 17 km (11 mi) from the city's historic center and it is the state's most important airway terminal. It is served by several domestic flights and as well as flights to several destinations in the United States such as Chicago–Midway, Dallas/Fort Worth, Houston–Intercontinental, and San Antonio.

=== Roadways ===
San Luis Potosí is served by several strategically important roadways.

- Mexican Federal Highway 49 connects the city northwest to Zacatecas.
- Mexican Federal Highway 57 runs through the city and connects north to Saltillo, Monterrey, and United States border, and south to Querétaro and Mexico City.
- Mexican Federal Highway 70 connects the city west to Aguascalientes and east to the port city of Tampico on the Gulf of Mexico.
- Mexican Federal Highway 80 connects the city west to Guadalajara.

=== Bus ===
San Luis Potosí is served by an extensive urban bus system and a four-route bus rapid transit (BRT) network known as Mi Red Metro with a fare collection system known as MetroRed.

The Terminal Terrestre Potosina, located along Highway 57, is the city's primary inter-city bus terminal.

=== Rail ===
Canadian Pacific Kansas City (CPKC) operates several freight rail lines throughout the city. It also offers a premium intermodal rail service known as the Mexico Midwest Express, which originates in Chicago in the United States and terminates in San Luis Potosí. CPKC states that it is the fastest cross-border rail service in North America and the only single-line rail service between Mexico and the Midwestern United States.

Until 1997, Mexico's now defunct state-owned railway company, Ferrocarriles Nacionales de México (N de M), provided passenger rail service to destinations such as Aguascalientes, Mexico City, Monterrey, Nuevo Laredo, and Tampico. The city's former passenger rail station was converted into a railway museum.

In 2024, Mexican President Claudia Sheinbaum announced the construction of several new passenger rail lines across Mexico, one of which will serve San Luis Potosí. The proposed rail services will connect the city south to Querétaro and Mexico City and north to Saltillo, Monterrey, and Nuevo Laredo, similar to its pre-1997 services. Construction of the service between the city and Querétaro is expected to begin construction in 2026 and be operational by 2028. The state is planning to re-use its former railway station for the new services.

== Higher education and scientific research ==
These places offer degrees at the bachelor level:

- El Colegio de San Luis
- Instituto Potosino de Investigación Científica y Tecnológica, A.C. (IPICYT)
- Instituto Tecnologico de San Luis Potosí (ITSLP)
- Instituto Tecnologico y de Estudios Superiores de Monterrey – Campus San Luis (ITESM)
- Polytechnic University of San Luis Potosí
- Universidad Autonoma de San Luis Potosí (UASLP)
- Universidad del Centro de Mexico (UCEM)
- Universidad Cuauhtemoc – Campus San Luis Potosí
- Universidad Interamericana del Norte – Campus San Luis
- Universidad Interamericana para el Desarrollo – Campus San Luis
- Universidad Marista – Campus San Luis Potosí
- Universidad Pedagogica Nacional – Campus San Luis Potosí
- Universidad Politécnica de San Luis Potosí (UPSLP)
- Universidad Potosina
- Universidad Tangamanga
- Universidad Tec Milenio
- Universidad Tecnológica de San Luis Potosí

IPICYT, UASLP and El Colegio de San Luis are also world class research institutions that offer doctoral degrees.

== Media ==
Newspapers include El Sol de San Luis, Pulso, El Heraldo de San Luis, La Prensa, San Luis Hoy, La Jornada San Luis, and Tribuna.

== Festivals ==
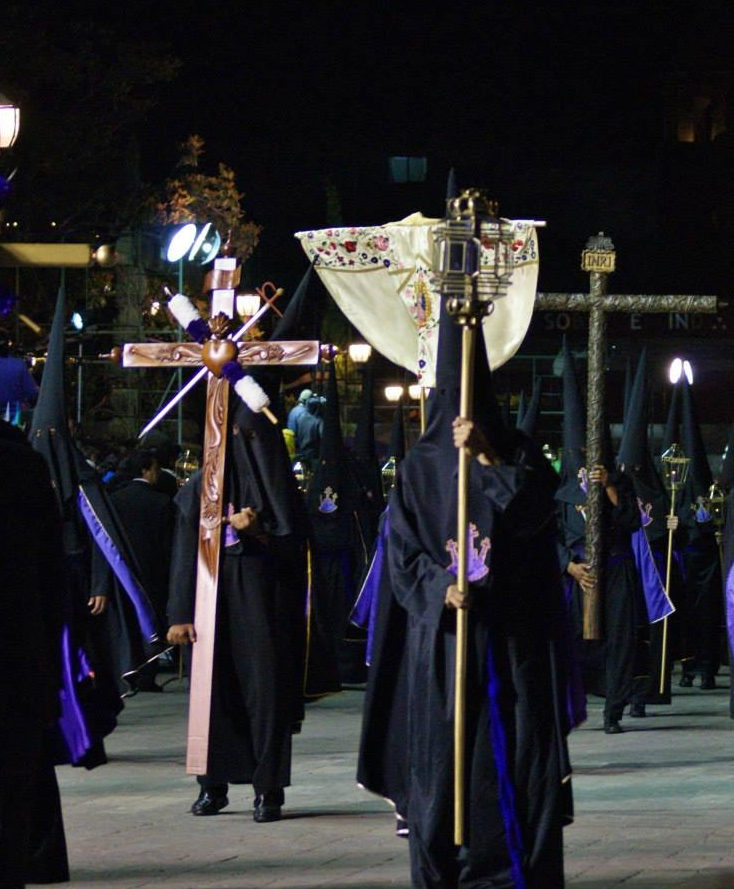
Procession of Silence on Good Friday in San Luis Potosí City

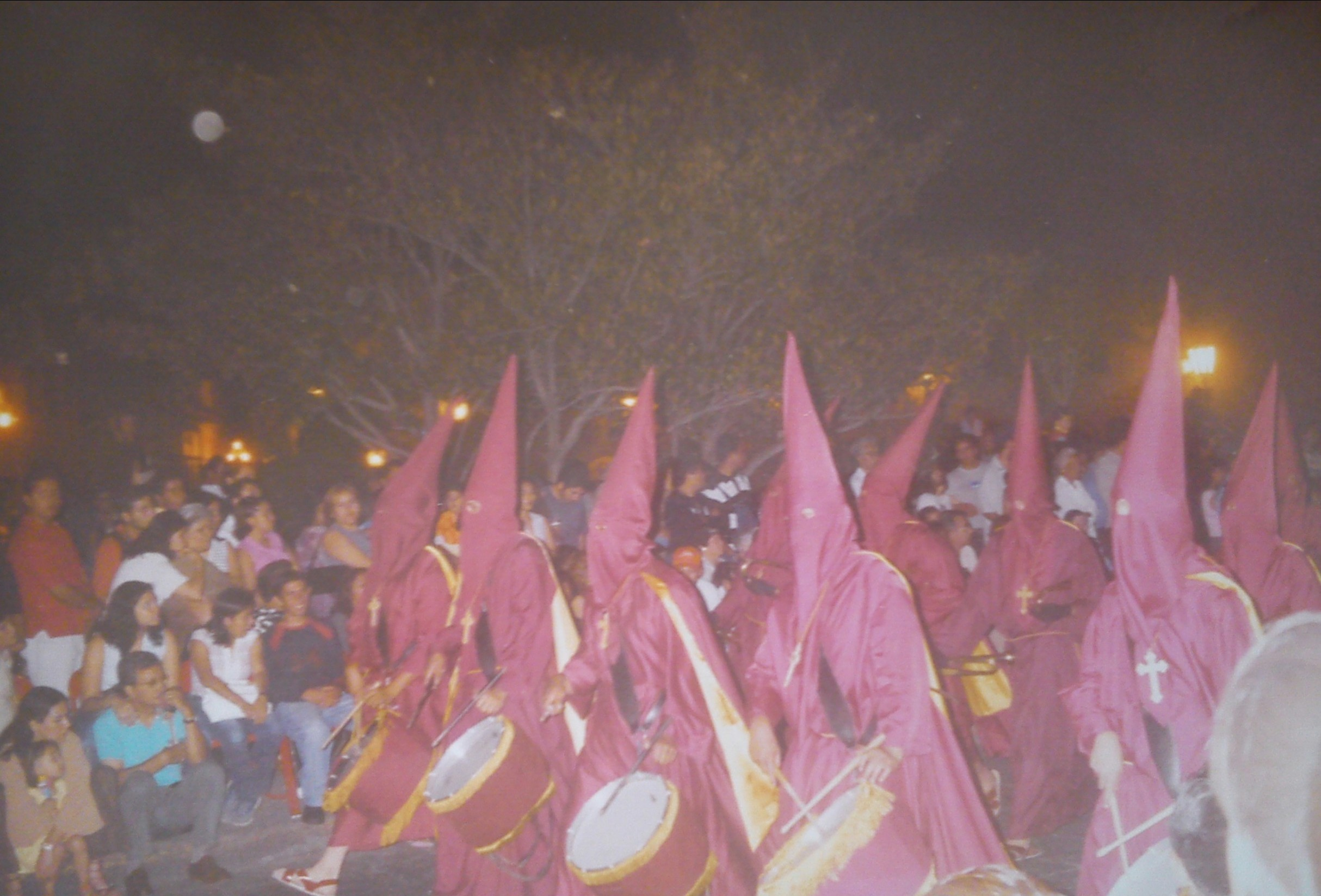
Procession of Silence, Good Friday

The Procession of Silence is an annual event commemorating the passion and death of Christ. It occurs on the night of Good Friday, starting at the Templo del Carmen, from where it originates and proceeding through the streets of the historic center of the city of San Luis Potosí. Drums and bugles are played as a part of the procession, but participants and spectators do not speak, meriting its name. It is one of the most important celebrations of Easter in Mexico and was declared part of the cultural heritage of the state of San Luis Potosí in 2013.

== Twin towns – sister cities ==
San Luis Potosí has the following sister cities in Mexico and abroad:

- Spokane, Washington, United States
- Tulsa, Oklahoma, United States
- Pico Rivera, California, United States
- St. Louis, Missouri, United States
- Pharr, Texas, United States
- Azusa, California, United States
- McAllen, Texas, United States
- Almadén, Spain
- Santander, Cantabria, Spain
- Sant Joan de les Abadesses, Spain
- Potosí, Bolivia
- Guadalajara, Jalisco, Mexico
- Aguascalientes, Aguascalientes, Mexico
- Guadalupe, Zacatecas, Mexico
- Zacatecas, Zacatecas, Mexico
- Ciudad Victoria, Mexico
- Ciudad Guzmán, Mexico
- Idrija, Slovenia
- Manizales, Colombia
- Bucaramanga, Colombia
- Antigua Guatemala, Guatemala
