= List of Mexicans =

This article contains a list of well-known Mexicans in science, publication, arts, politics and sports.

Estados Unidos Mexicanos

Flag of Mexico

Flag of Mexico

Mexican coat of arms

Coat of Arms

== Arts ==
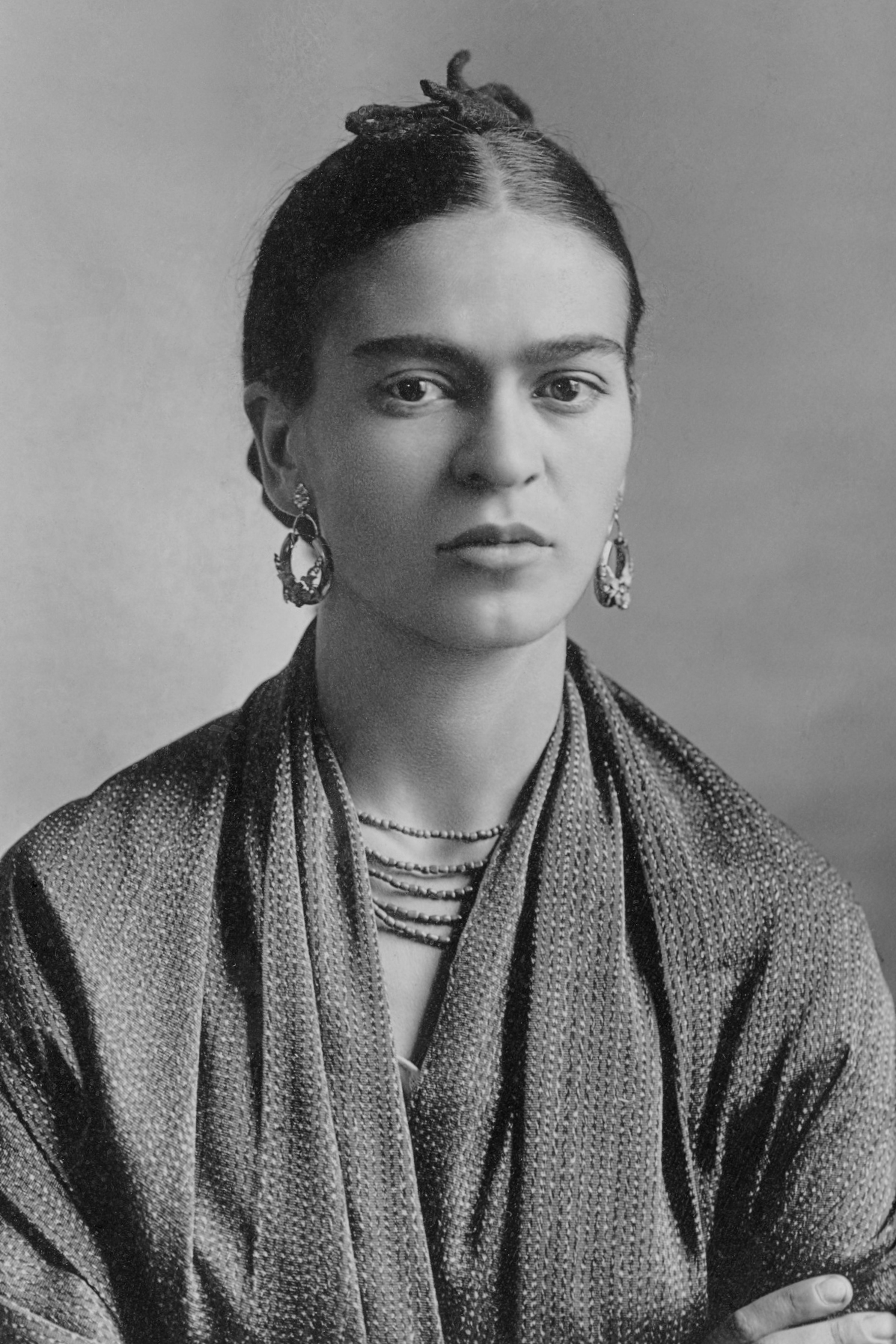
Frida Kahlo

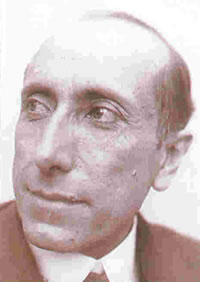
Amado Nervo

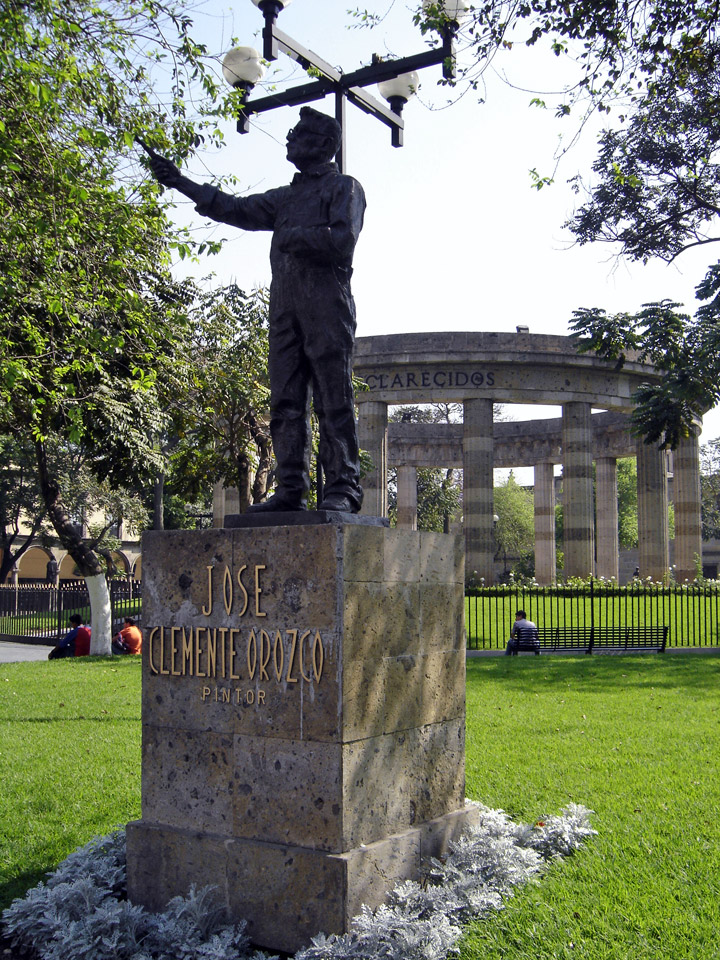
José Clemente Orozco

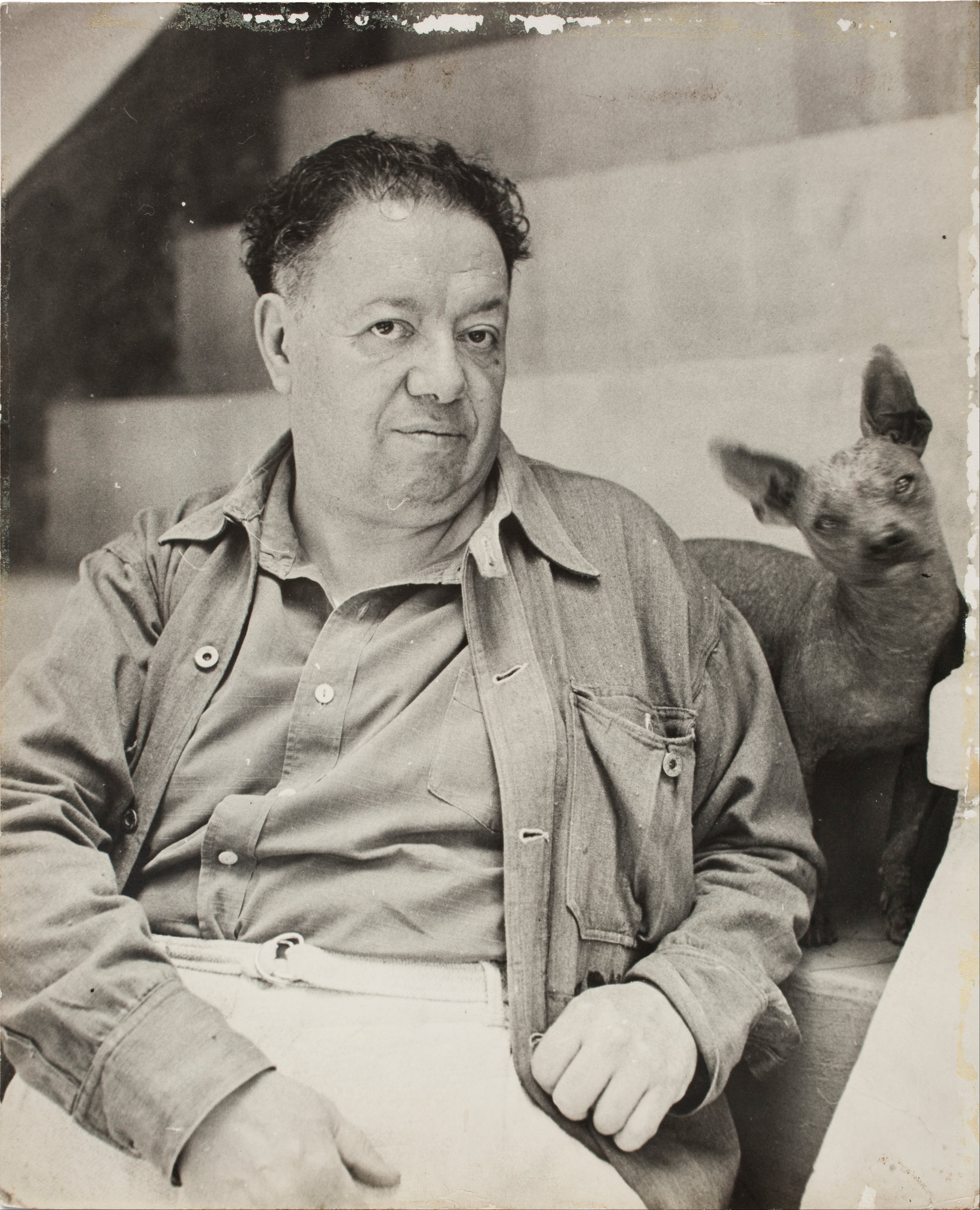
Diego Rivera

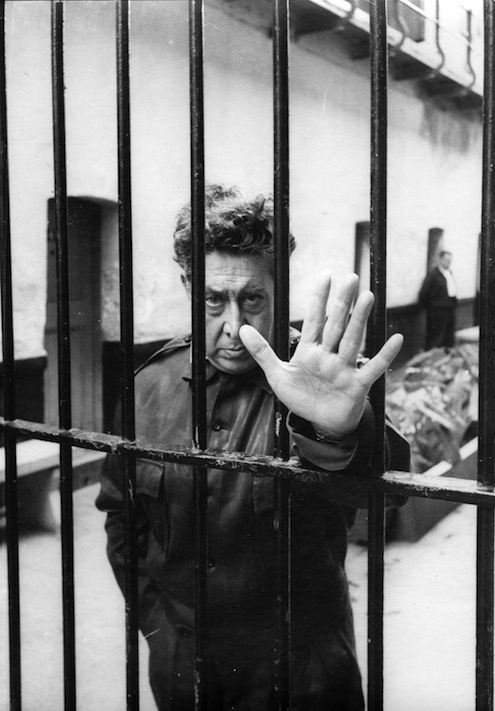
David Alfaro Siqueiros

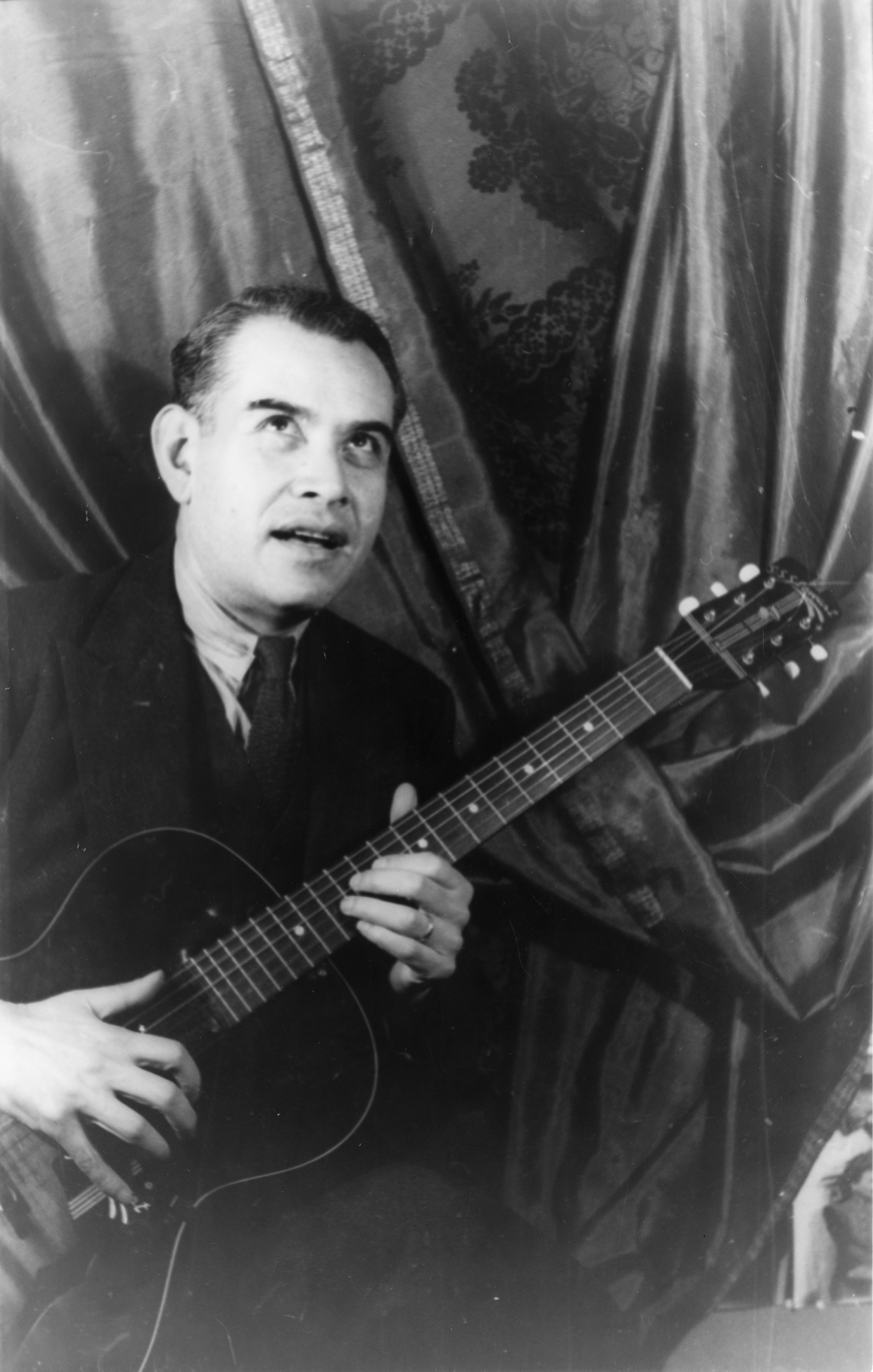
Rufino Tamayo

- Mauricio Alejo, artist-photographs and videos
- Manuel Álvarez Bravo, photographer; recipient, 1984 Hasselblad Award
- Pita Amor, poet
- Alberto Arai, architect, theorist and painter
- Luis Barragán, architect
- Lizet Benrey, painter
- Federico Cantú, writer
- Leonora Carrington, painter
- Max Cetto, architect, educator and historian
- Joaquín Clausell, painter
- Miguel Covarrubias, painter
- José Luis Cuevas, painter, printmaker
- Gelsen Gas, theater director; film director and producer; actor; painter; poet; sculptor and inventor
- Mathias Goeritz, painter, sculptor and architect
- Jorge González Camarena, painter, muralist and sculptor
- Saturnino Herrán, painter
- Graciela Iturbide, photographer; recipient, 2008 Hasselblad Award
- María Izquierdo, painter
- Frida Kahlo, painter
- Arturo Moyers Villena, painter
- Gerardo Murillo, painter
- Amado Nervo, poet
- Juan O'Gorman, painter and architect
- José Clemente Orozco, muralist, printmaker
- Eugenio Peschard, architect
- Beatriz Peschard, architect
- Guillermo Ríos Alcalá restoration expert and educator
- Antonio Rivas Mercado, architect and engineer
- Arturo Rivera, painter
- Diego Rivera, muralist, painter, printmaker
- Jesusa Rodríguez, director and performer
- Michel Rojkind, architect
- Verónica Ruiz de Velasco, figurative artist
- José Francisco Xavier de Salazar y Mendoza, painter
- Miguel Salmon Del Real, orquestra conductor
- Sebastián, sculptor
- Javier Sicilia, poet, activist
- David Alfaro Siqueiros, muralist, painter, printmaker
- Rufino Tamayo, painter, printmaker
- Mauricio Toussaint, painter
- Remedios Varo, painter
- José María Velasco, painter
- Abraham Zabludovsky, architect
- Alejandro Zohn, architect

== Authors ==
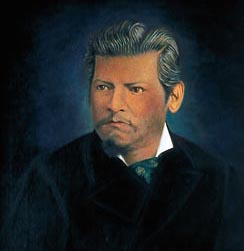
Ignacio Manuel Altamirano

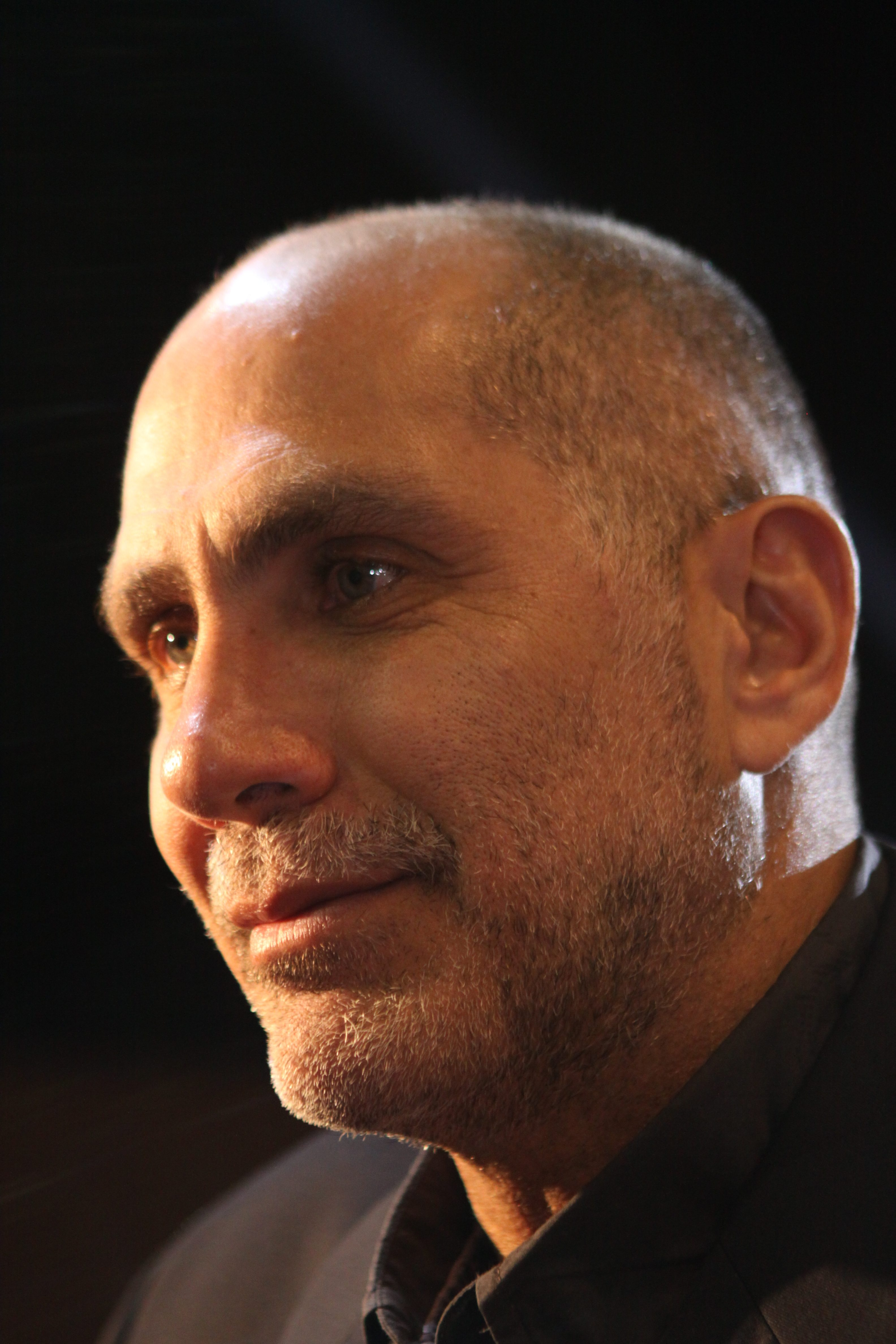
Guillermo Arriaga

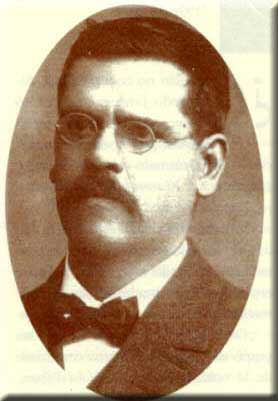
Mariano Azuela

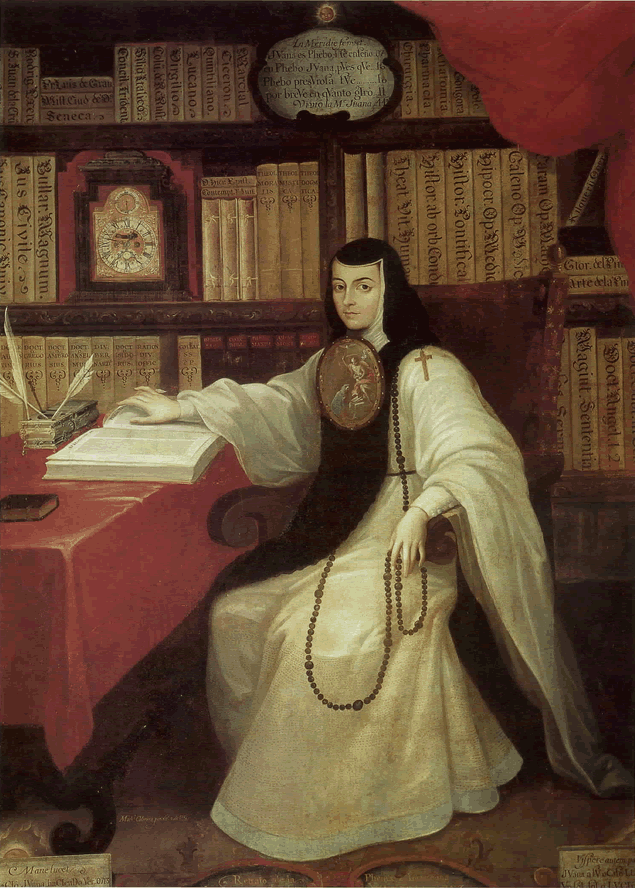
Sor Juana Inés de la Cruz

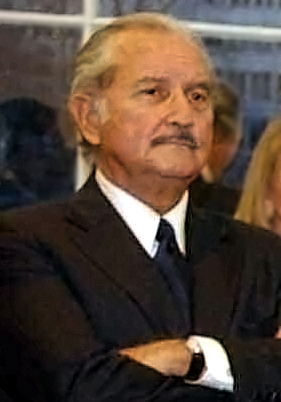
Carlos Fuentes

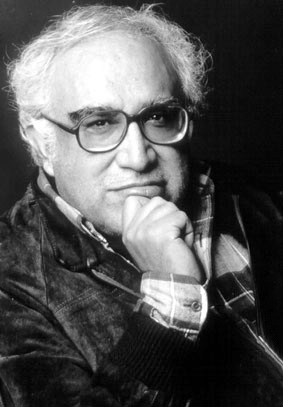
Carlos Monsivais

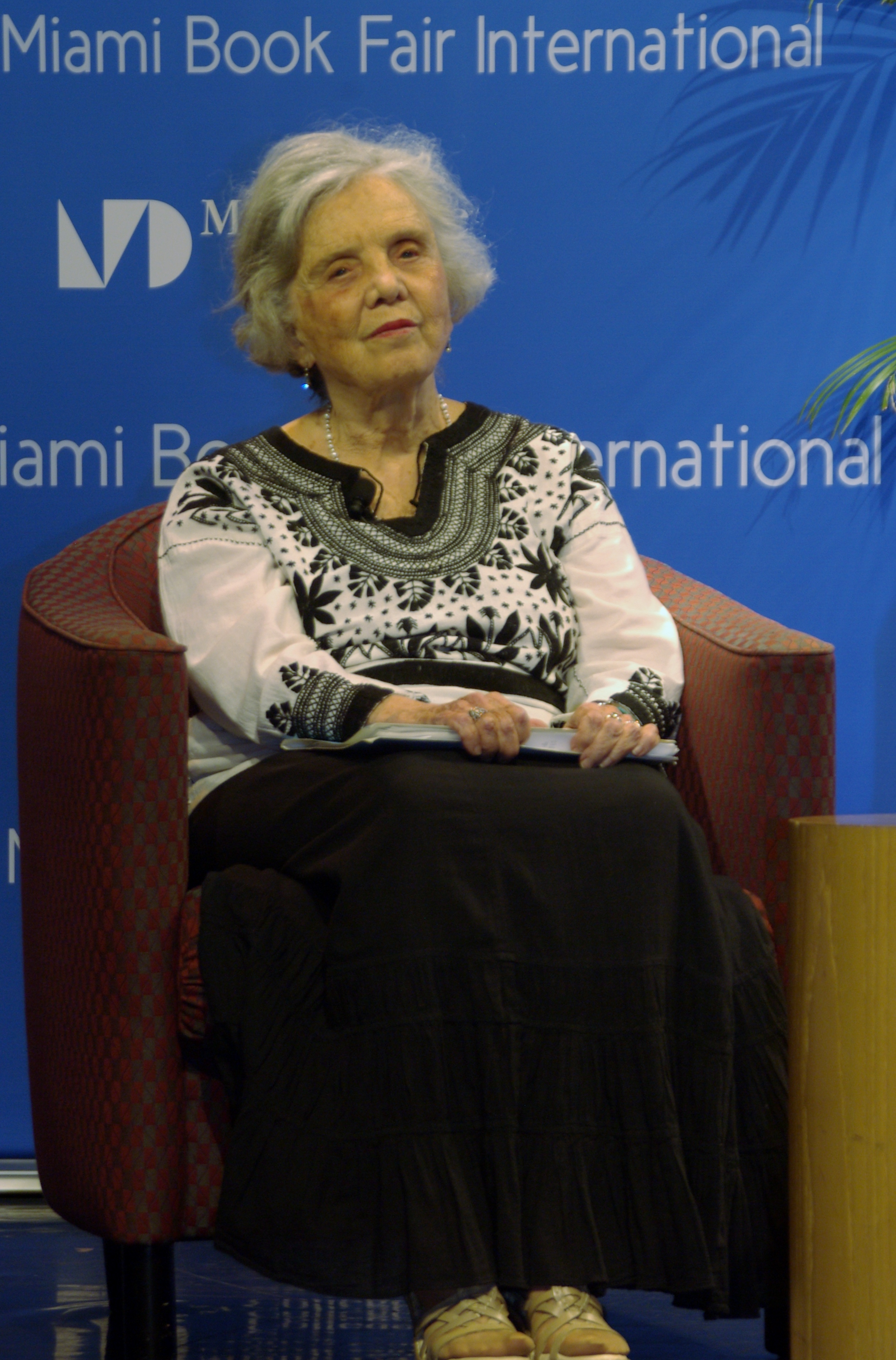
Elene Poniatowska

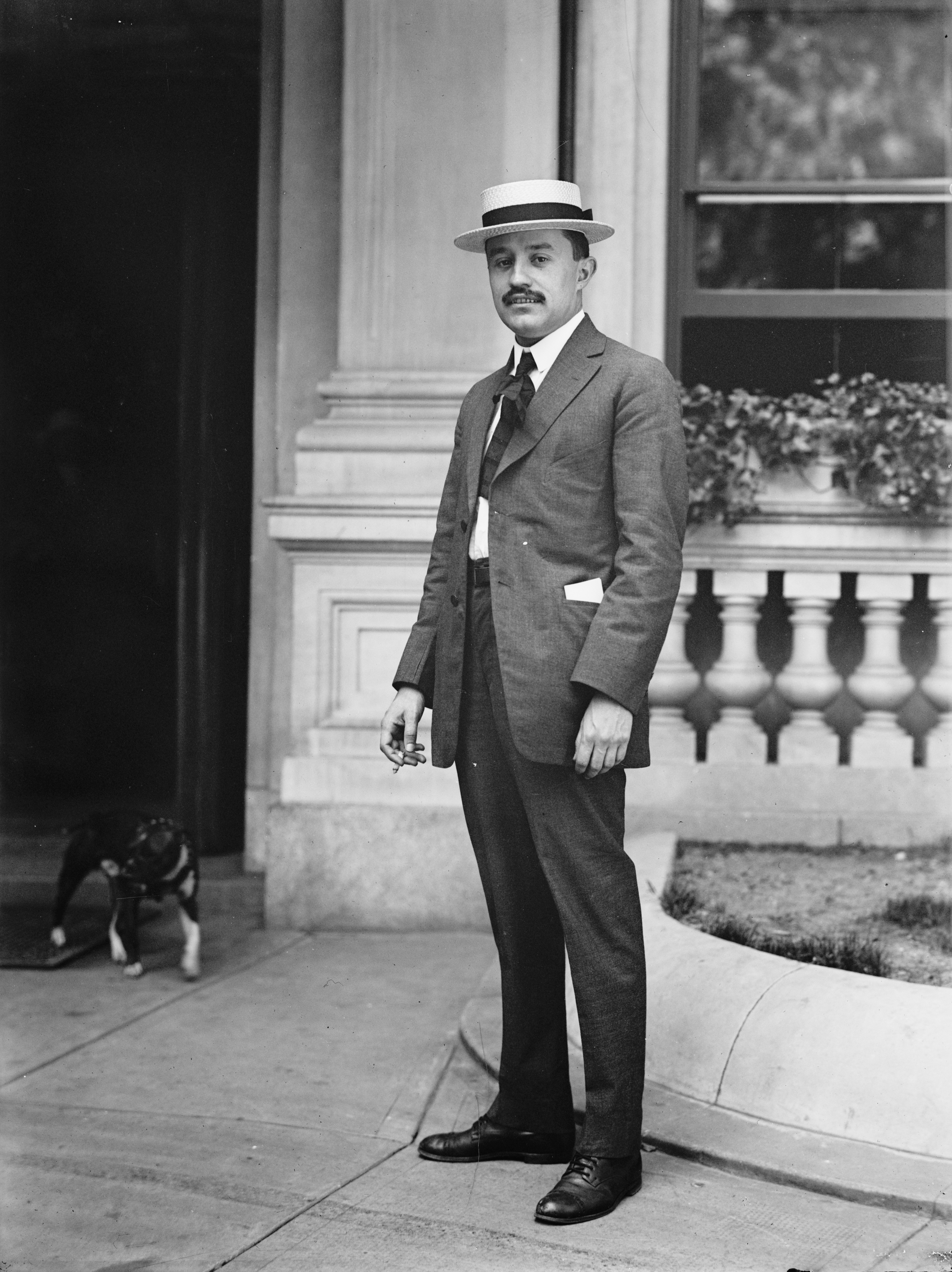
José Vasconcelos

- Ignacio Manuel Altamirano
- Pita Amor
- Juan José Arreola
- Guillermo Arriaga
- Mariano Azuela
- Caridad Bravo Adams
- Roberto Bravo
- Ignacio Burgoa Orihuela
- Emilio Carballido
- Rosario Castellanos
- Sor Juana Inés de la Cruz
- Yolanda Vargas Dulché
- Salvador Elizondo
- José Joaquín Fernández de Lizardi
- Carlos Fuentes
- Martín Luis Guzmán
- Guadalupe Loaeza
- Gregorio López y Fuentes
- Ángeles Mastretta
- Carlos Monsiváis
- Nezahualcoyotl
- Salvador Novo
- Fernando del Paso
- José Emilio Pacheco
- Susana Palazuelos
- Alfredo Placencia
- Elena Poniatowska
- Alfonso Reyes
- José Revueltas
- Luis J. Rodriguez
- Juan Rulfo
- Juan Ruiz de Alarcón
- Jaime Sabines
- Paco Ignacio Taibo II
- Lourdes Urrea
- José Vasconcelos
- Agustín Yáñez

== Aviators ==
- Alfonso Virgen Meza

== Businesspeople ==
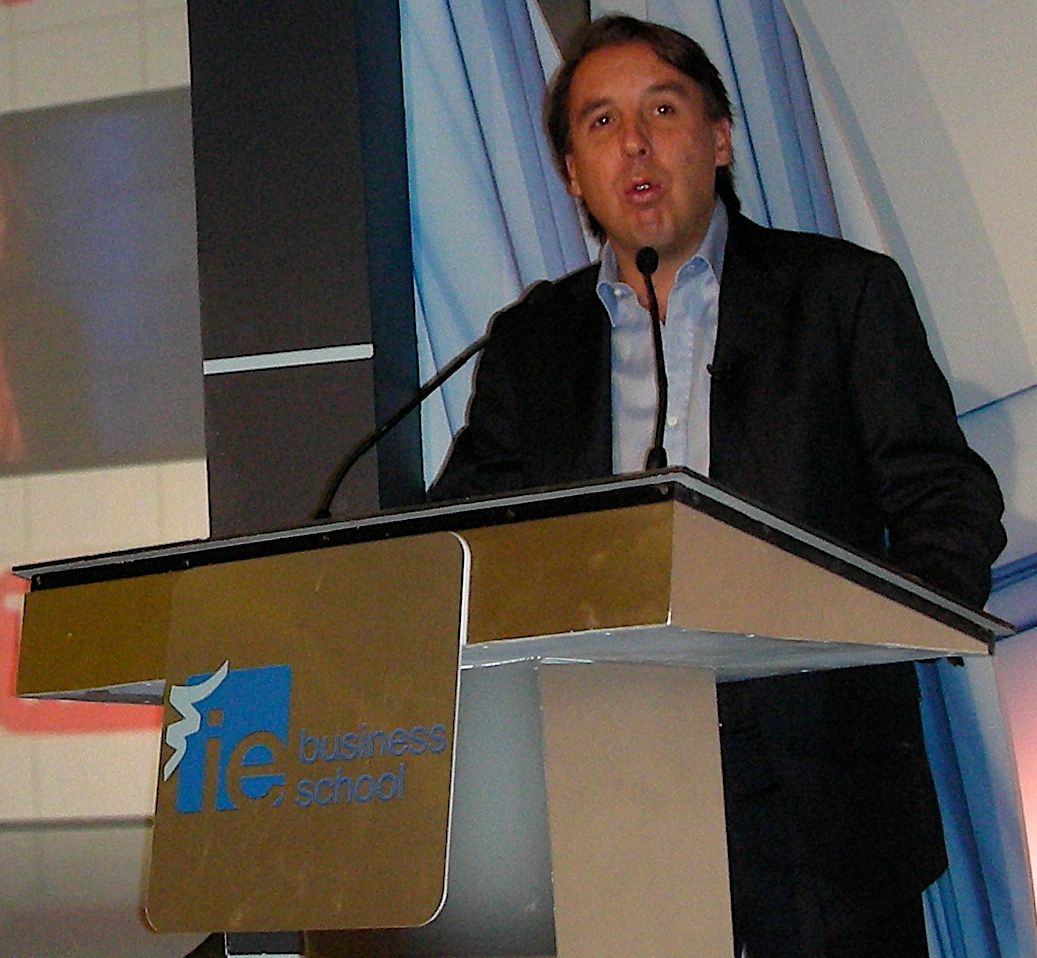
Emilio Azcárraga Jean

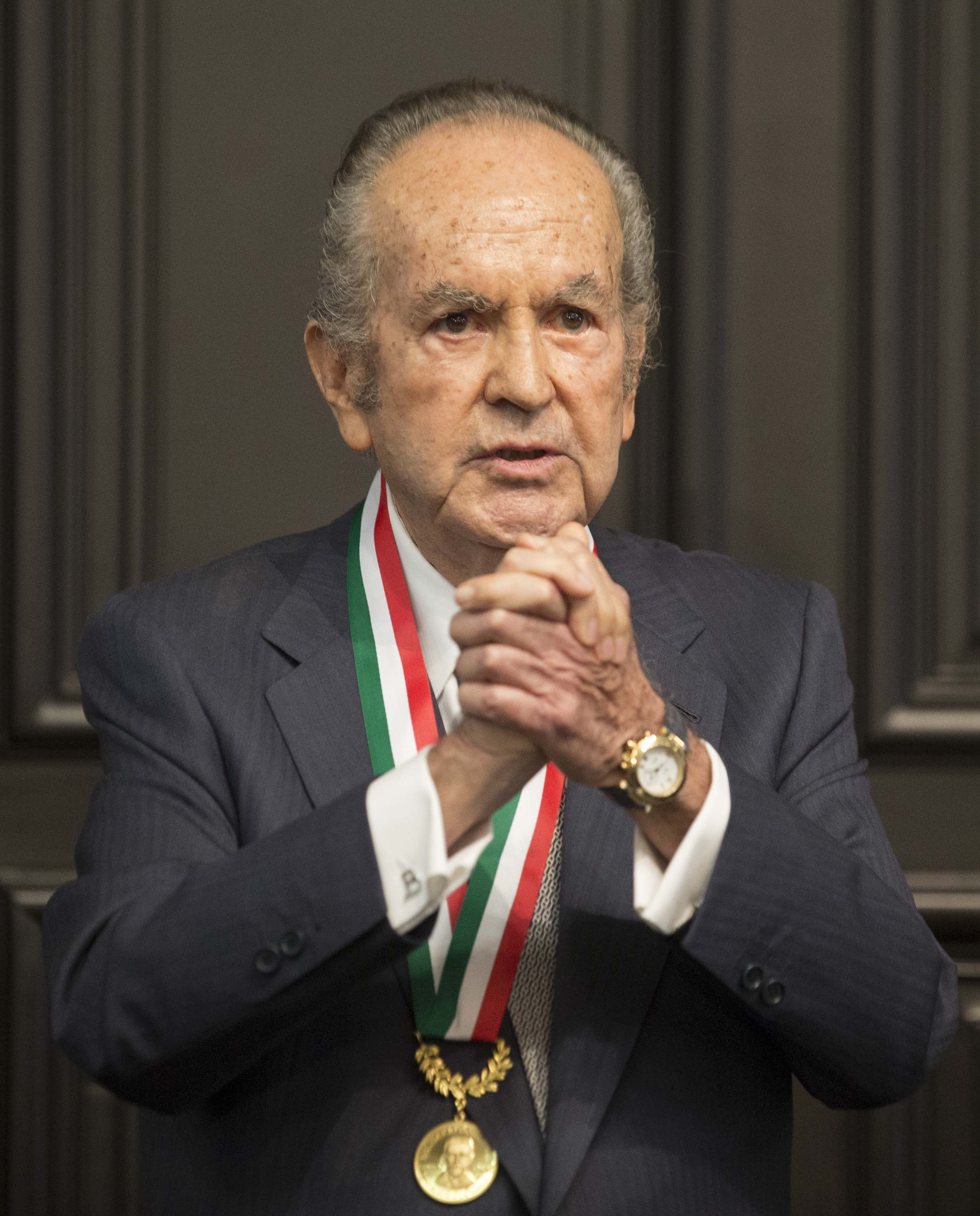
Alberto Baillères

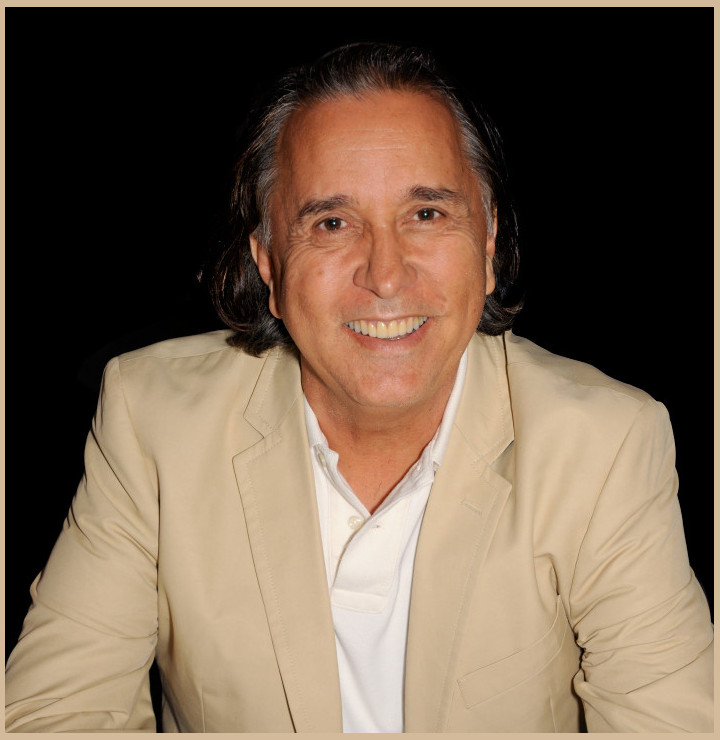
Daniel Chavez Moran

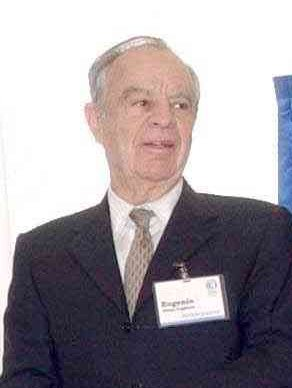
Eugenio Garza Laguera

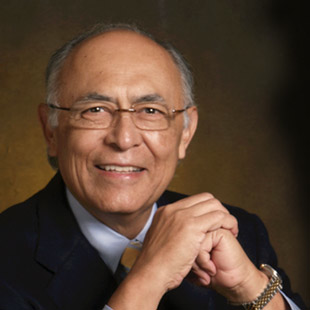
Hector Ruiz

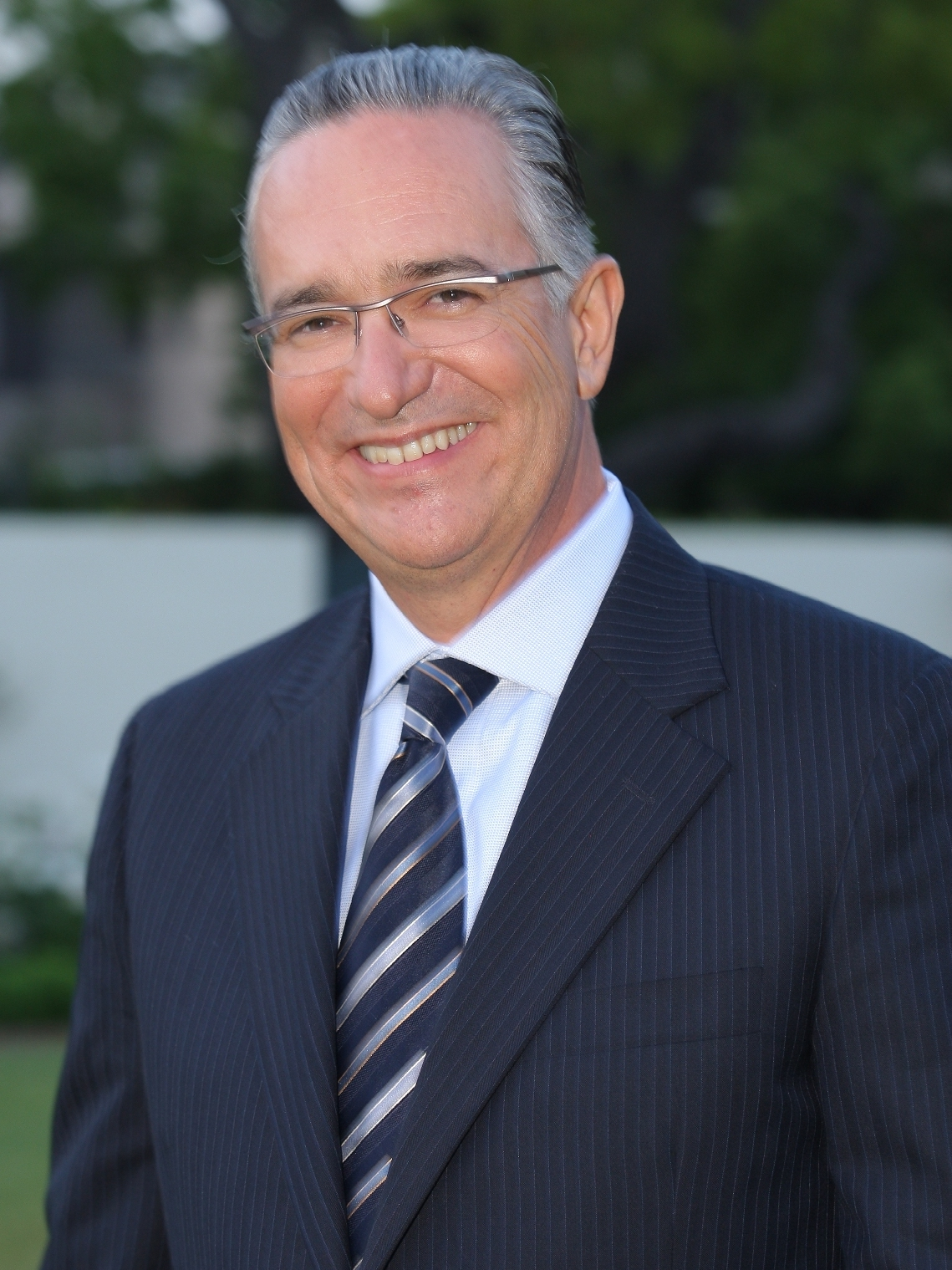
Ricardo Salinas Pliego

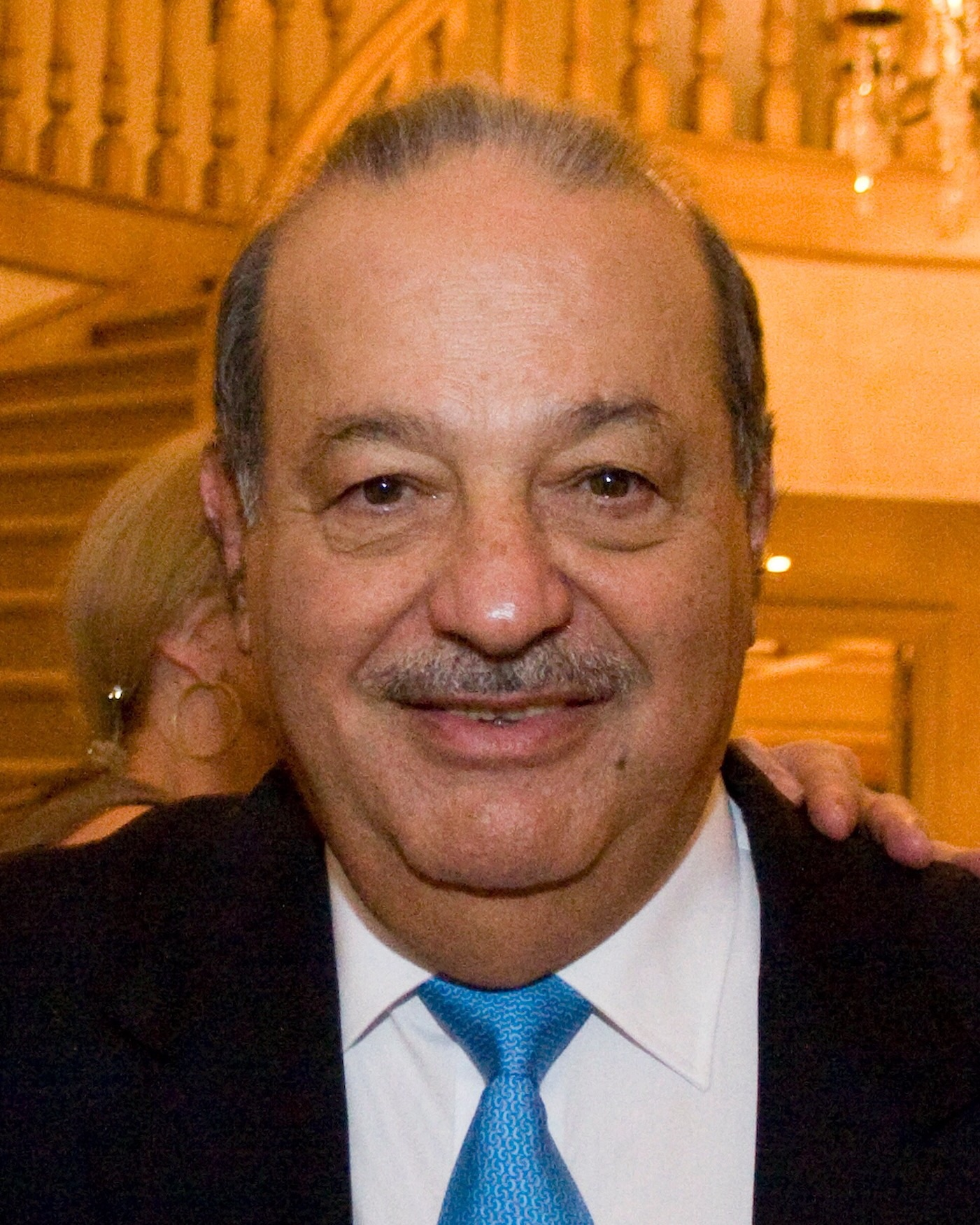
Carlos Slim

- Martínez del Río family
- María Asunción Aramburuzabala
- Jerónimo Arango
- Emilio Azcárraga Jean
- Emilio Azcárraga Milmo
- Emilio Azcárraga Vidaurreta
- Alberto Baillères
- Raúl Baillères
- Daniel Chávez Morán
- Andrés Conesa
- Juan Domingo Beckmann
- Arturo Elías Ayub
- Juan Enríquez
- Eugenio Garza Lagüera
- Eugenio Garza Sada, philanthropist
- Roberto González Barrera
- Víctor González Torres
- Joaquín "El Chapo" Guzmán
- Jorge Hank Rhon
- Alfredo Harp Helú
- Roberto Hernández Ramírez
- Fidel Kuri Grajales
- Jorge Lankenau
- Germán Larrea Mota-Velasco
- Enrique Molina Sobrino
- Emilio Romano
- Pedro Romero de Terreros
- Alfonso Romo
- Hector Ruiz
- Isaac Saba Raffoul
- Ricardo Salinas Pliego
- Daniel Servitje Montull
- Carlos Slim
- Antonio Suárez
- Jorge Vergara
- Lorenzo Zambrano

== Cartoonists ==
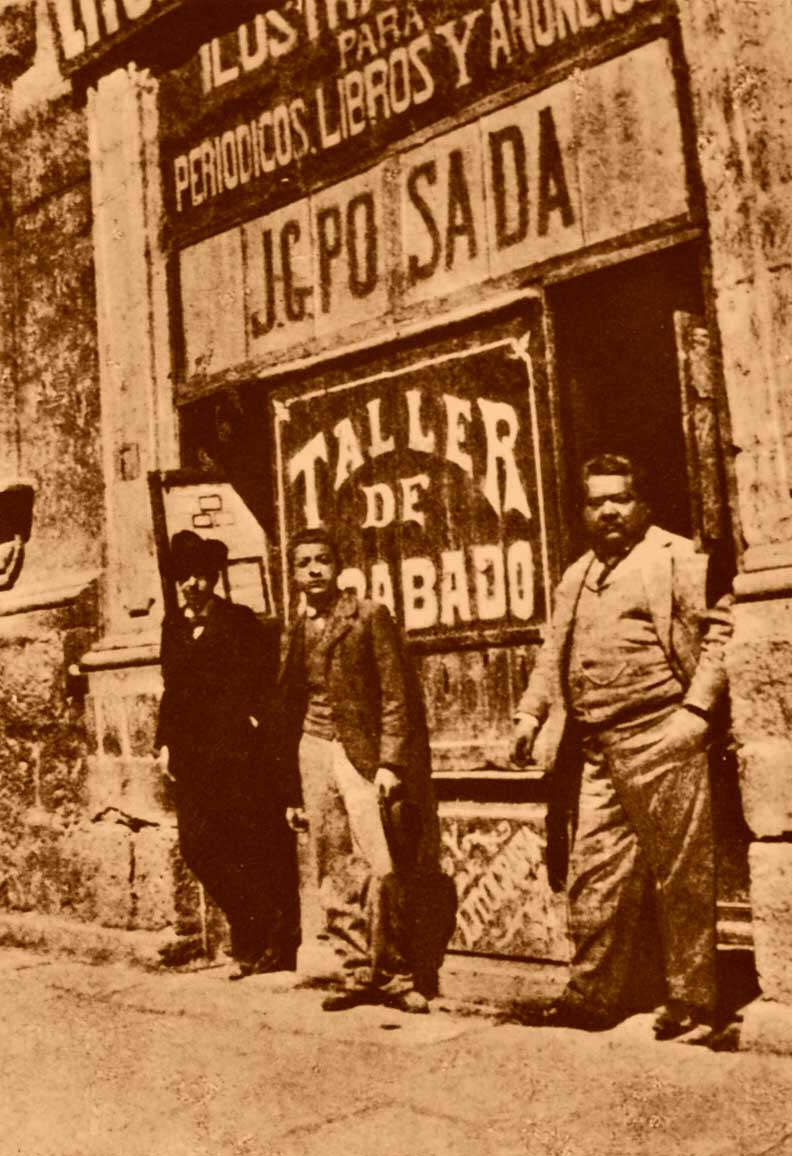
José Guadalupe Posada

- Lalo Alcaraz
- Paco Calderón
- José G. Cruz
- Eduardo del Río, Rius
- Bill Melendez
- José Guadalupe Posada

== Musicians, conductors and composers of concert music ==
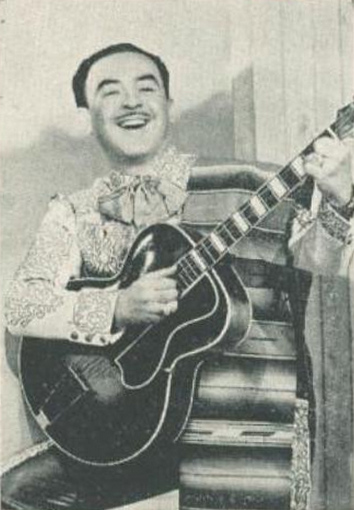
Juan Arvizu, lyric tenor

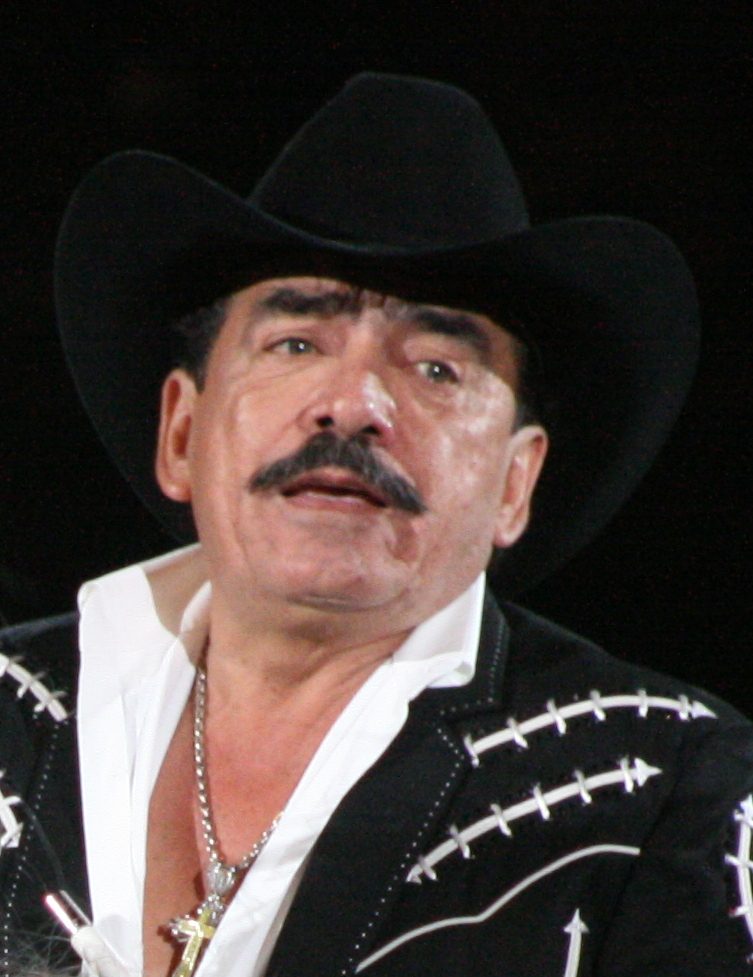
Joan Sebastian

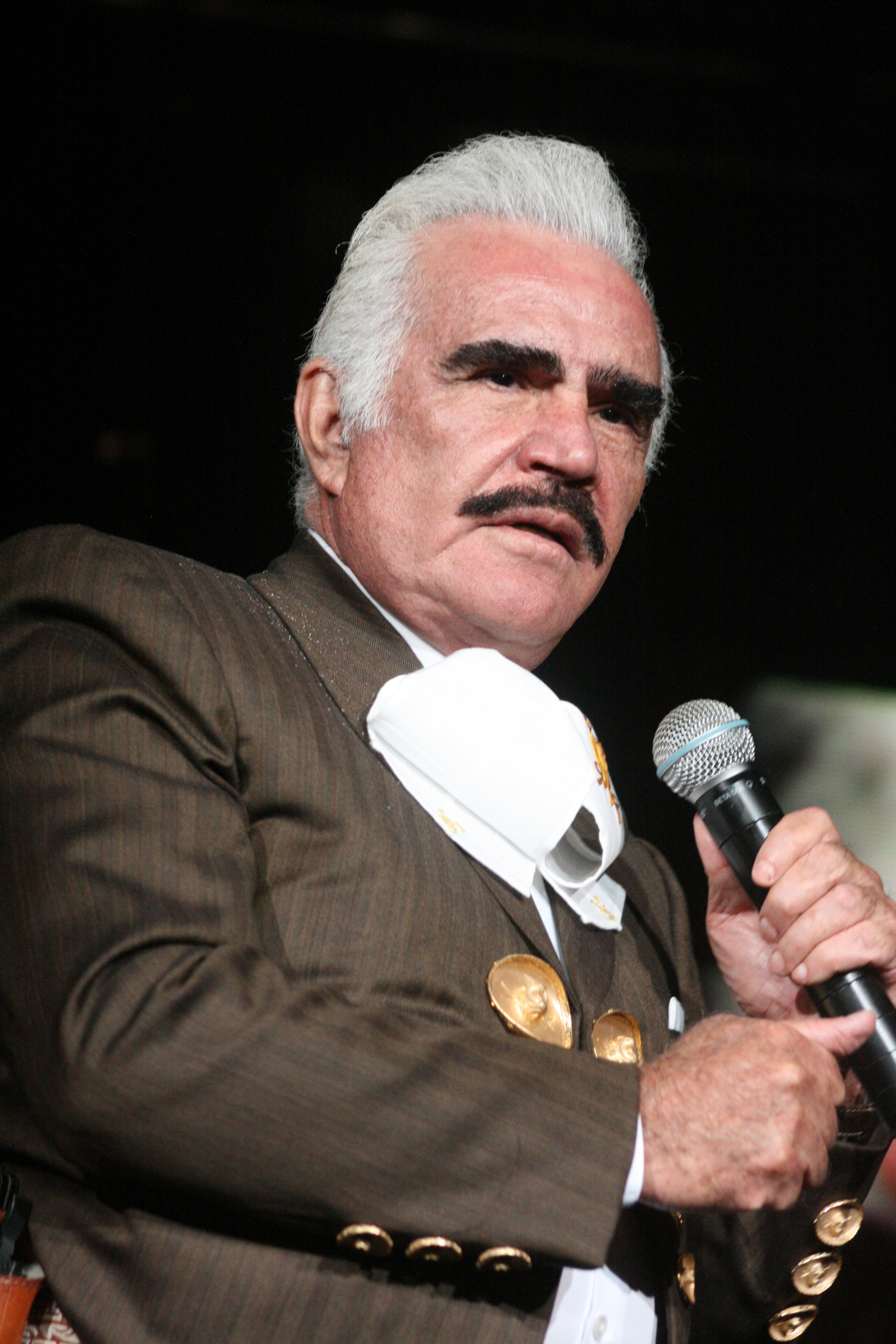
Vicente Fernández

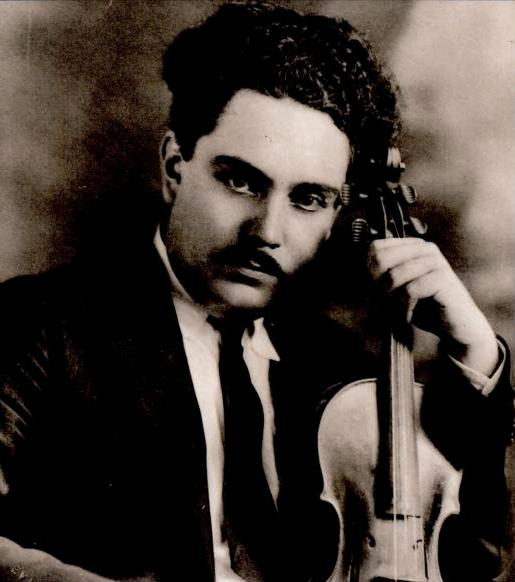
Silvestre Revueltas

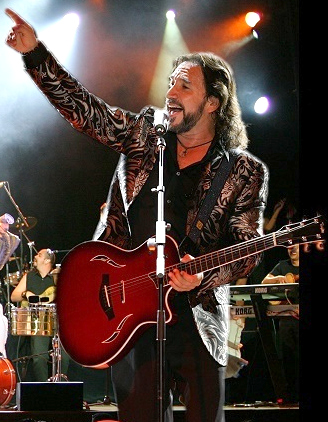
Marco Antonio Solís

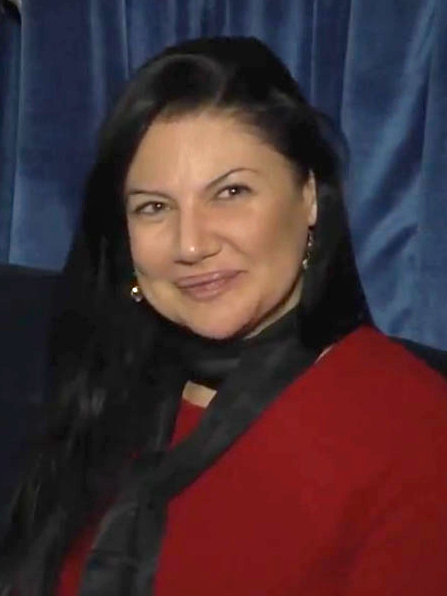
Alejandra Ávalos

- Rubén Albarrán
- Alfonso Mejia-Arias, musician, writer, social activist, politician
- Antonio Aguilar, singer, composer
- Juan Arvizu, lyric tenor
- Alejandra Ávalos, singer-songwriter, actress, composer
- Ariel Camacho
- Natanael Cano
- Felix Carrasco, conductor
- Nestor Mesta Chayres, lyric tenor
- Rey Alejandro Conde, conductor
- Manuel Esperón, composer, musician, conductor
- Silvana Estrada, musician, singer
- Pedro Fernández, singer-songwriter, actor, composer
- Vicente Fernández, singer, composer
- Horacio Franco, recorder player
- Mike Fuentes, drummer
- Juan Gabriel, singer
- Irma González, operatic soprano
- Saúl Hernández
- Pedro Infante singer, composer
- Agustín Lara, singer, composer
- José Madero, singer, composer
- Armando Manzanero, singer, composer
- Arturo Márquez, composer
- Manuel M. Ponce, musician, composer
- Jaime Preciado, bassist
- Carlos Miguel Prieto
- Silvestre Revueltas, composer, conductor
- Elvira Ríos, singer-songwriter, actress, composer
- Jesús Adrián Romero, Christian singer-songwriter
- Sofía Reyes, singer-songwriter
- Cesar Rosas, singer, vocalist
- Juventino Rosas
- Paulina Rubio, singer
- Chalino Sánchez
- Joan Sebastian, singer, composer
- Marco Antonio Solís, singer, composer
- Tatiana, singer
- Reyli, singer-songwriter
- Thalía, singer
- Damián Antón Ojeda

== Entertainers ==
=== A–C ===
- Amalia Aguilar, actress
- Mauricio Aspe, actor
- Alejandro Felipe, actor
- Antonio Aguilar, singer
- Luis Aguilar, singer
- Pepe Aguilar, singer
- Elsa Aguirre, actress
- Rubén Aguirre, comedian, actor
- Damián Alcázar, actor
- Julio Alemán, actor
- Fernando Allende, actor, film director
- Ana Alicia, actress
- Mario Almada, actor
- Ilean Almaguer, actress
- Rafael Amaya, actor
- César Amigó, film director
- Adolfo Angel, singer
- Angélica María, singer
- Alfonso Aráu, actor and director
- Guillermo Arriaga, screenwriter, director and producer
- Ramón Ayala, singer
- Anahí, actress, singer
- Angélica Aragón, actress
- Abraham Ramos, actor
- Aracely Arámbula, actress
- Esteban Arce, show host
- Pedro Armendáriz, actor
- Pedro Armendáriz Jr., actor
- Adriana Barraza, actress
- Meche Barba, actress
- Ana Bárbara, singer
- Katie Barberi, actress
- Melissa Barrera, actress
- Alejandra Barros, actress
- Renato Bartilotti, actor
- Sergio Basañez, actor
- Kuno Becker, actor
- Lola Beltrán, singer
- Belinda, actress, singer
- Elsa Benítez, model
- Juan Manuel Bernal, actor
- Agustín Bernal, actor
- Erika Buenfil, actress
- Demián Bichir, actor
- Jorge Blanco, actor, singer
- Marcela Bovio, singer
- Angelique Boyer, actress
- Jacqueline Bracamontes, actress, model
- Olga Breeskin, vedette
- Claudio Brook, actor
- Daniela Bobadilla, actress
- Alejandro Camacho, actor and producer
- Jaime Camil, singer, actor
- Marco Antonio Campos Viruta, comedian, actor
- Carmen Campuzano, actress, fashion model
- Jamie Camil, actor
- Itatí Cantoral, actress
- Paty Cantú, singer
- Eduardo Capetillo, actor
- Elpidia Carrillo, actress
- Yadhira Carrillo, actress
- Irán Castillo, actress
- Cristian Castro, singer
- Verónica Castro, actress, singer
- David Cavazos, singer
- Lumi Cavazos, actress
- Christian Chávez, actor, singer
- Sharis Cid, actress
- Fernando Colunga, actor
- Ninel Conde, actress, model, singer
- Karla Cossío, actress
- Alfonso Cuarón, film director
- Luis de Alba, actor, comedian
- Rebecca de Alba, show host
- Alfonso de Anda, show host
- José María de Tavira, actor
- Ana de la Reguera, actress
- Arath de la Torre, actor
- María Antonieta de las Nieves, actress
- Kate del Castillo, actress

=== D–G ===
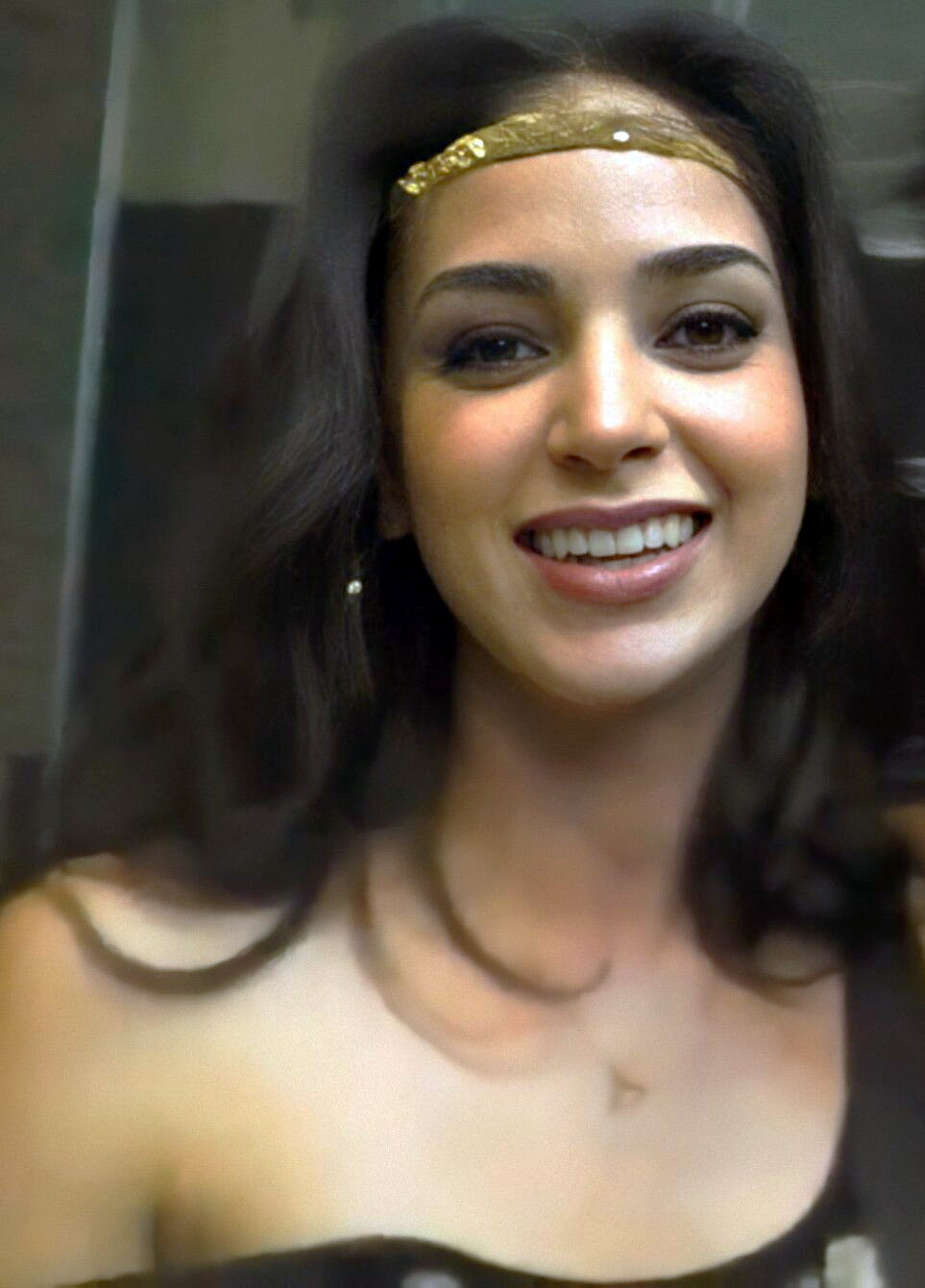
Melissa Barrera

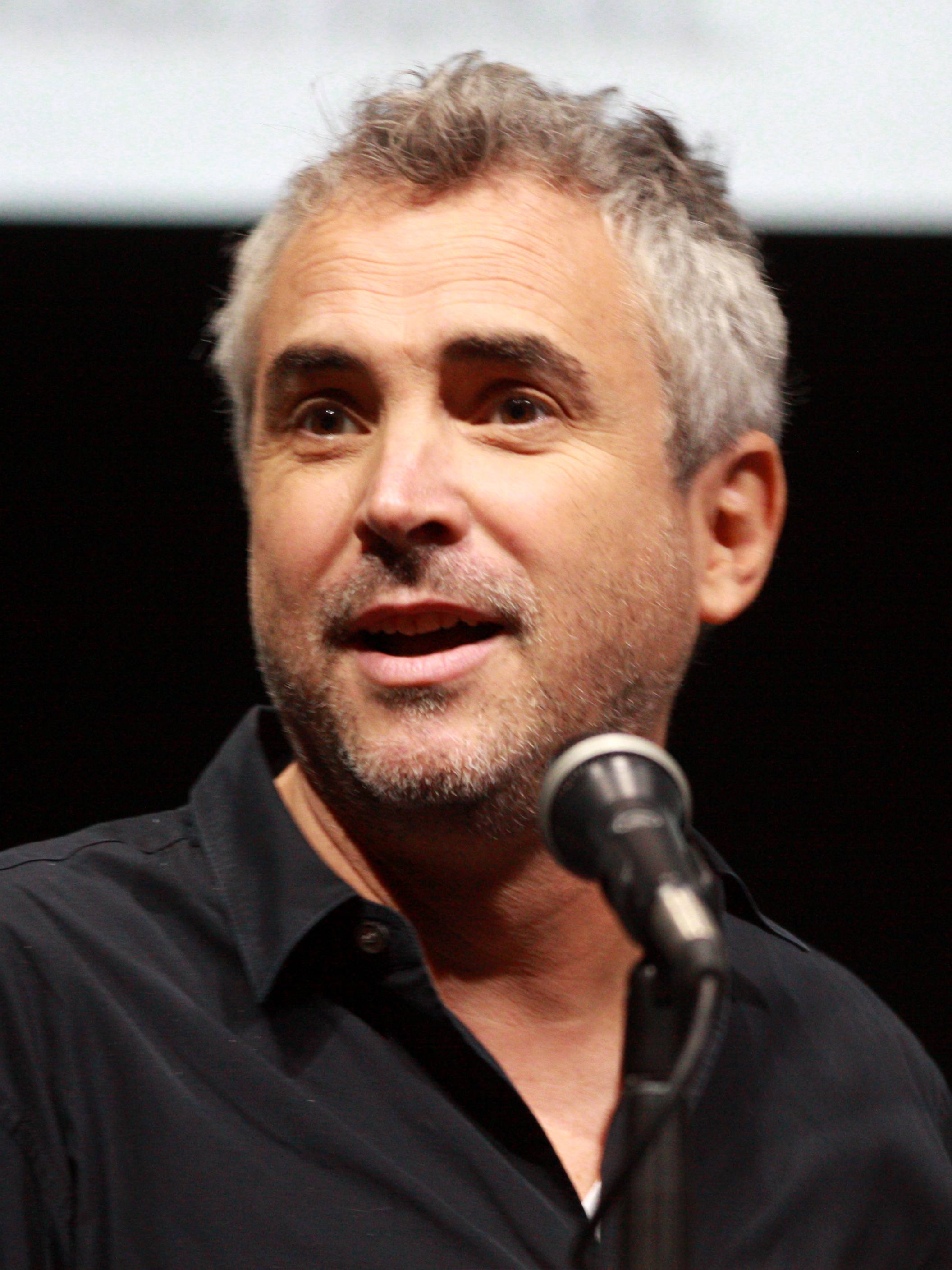
Alfonso Cuarón

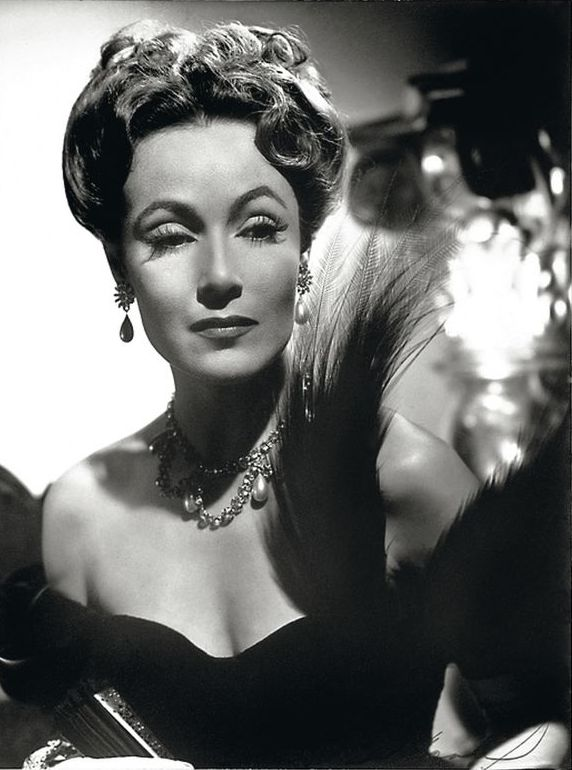
Dolores del Río

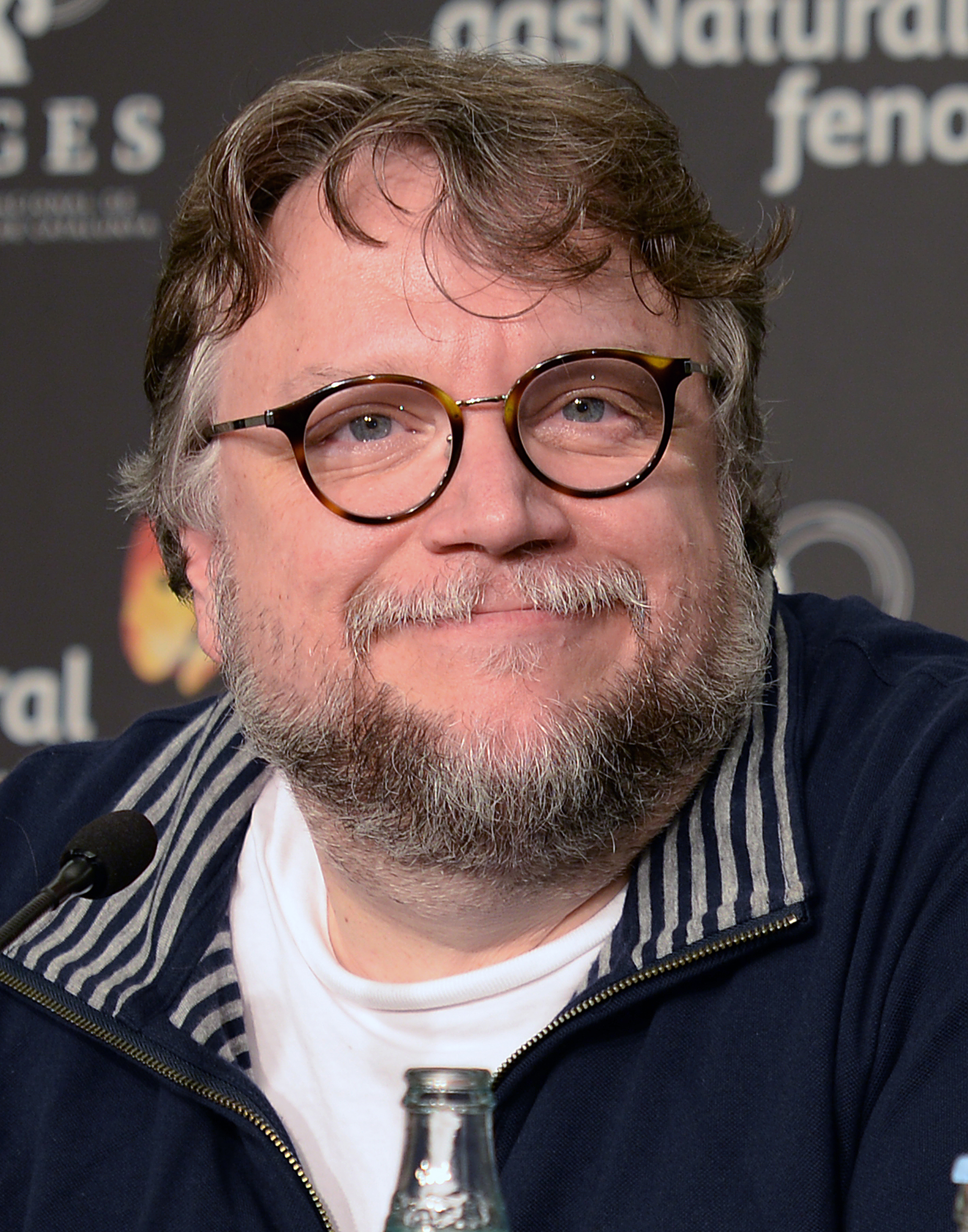
Guillermo del Toro

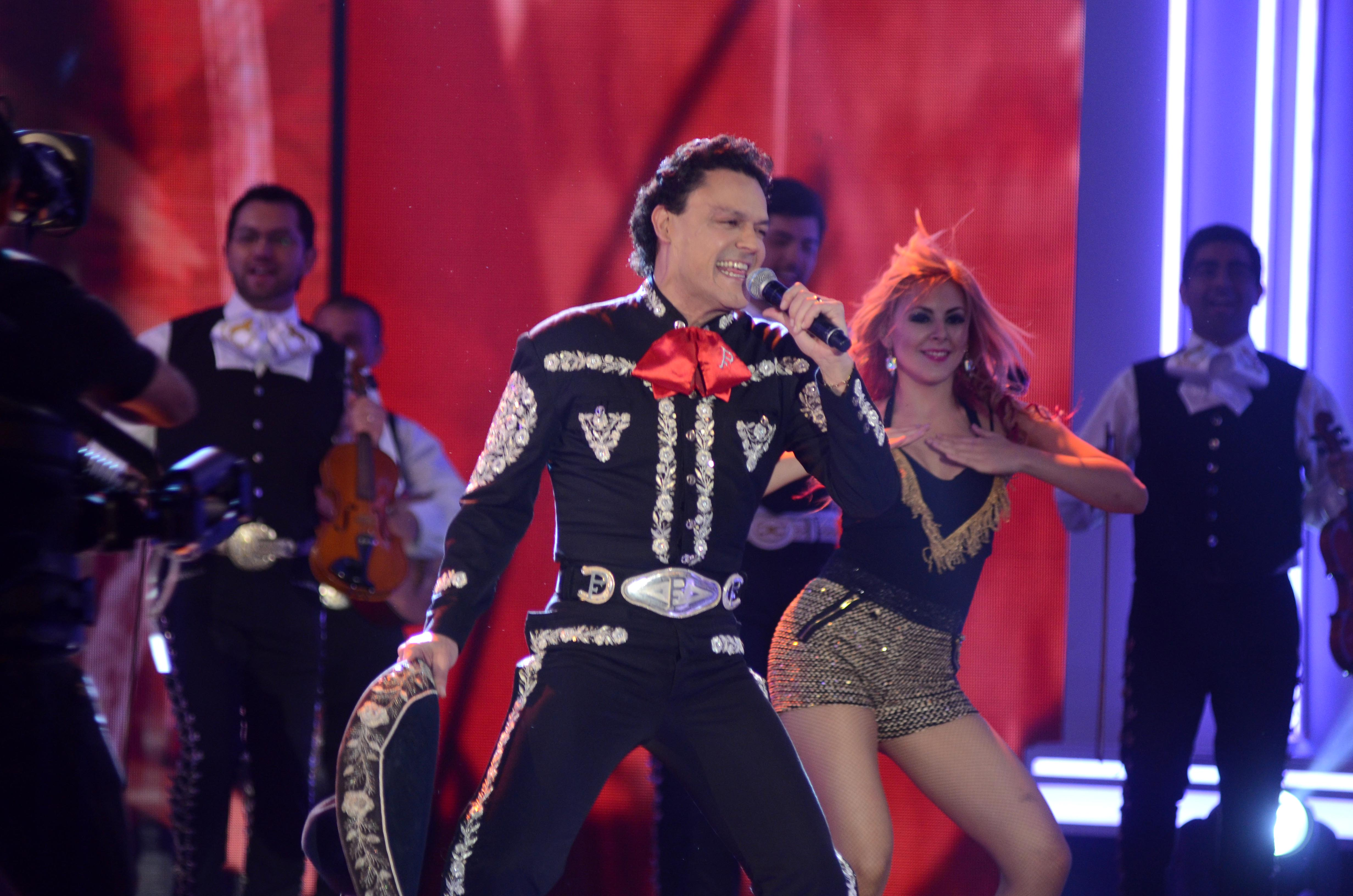
Pedro Fernández

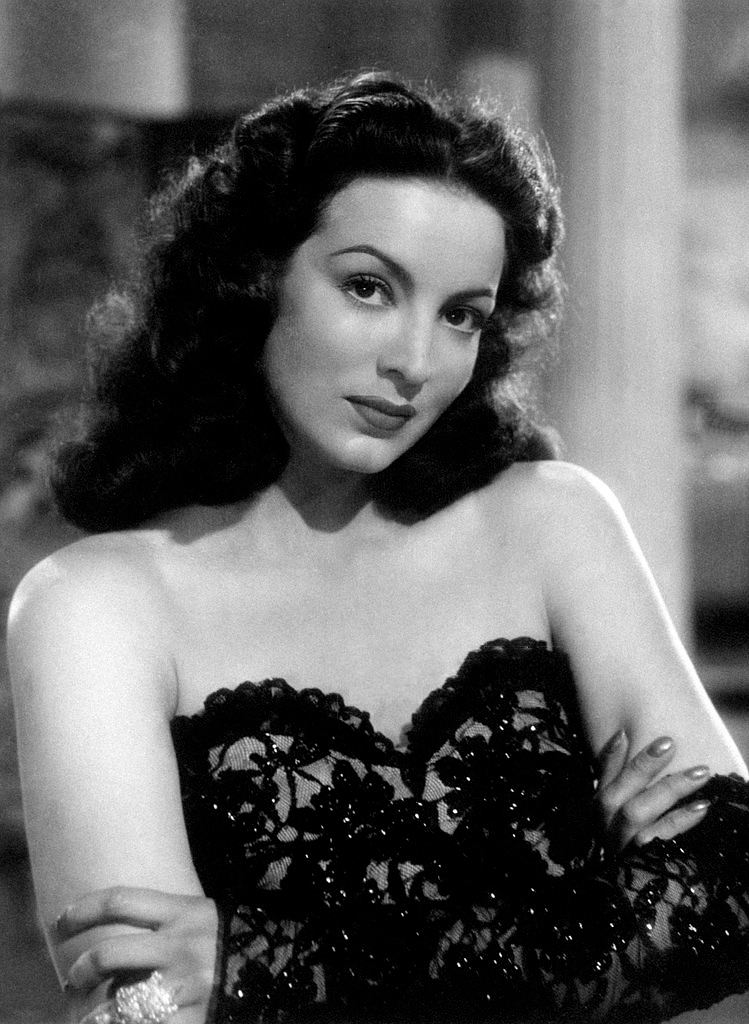
María Félix

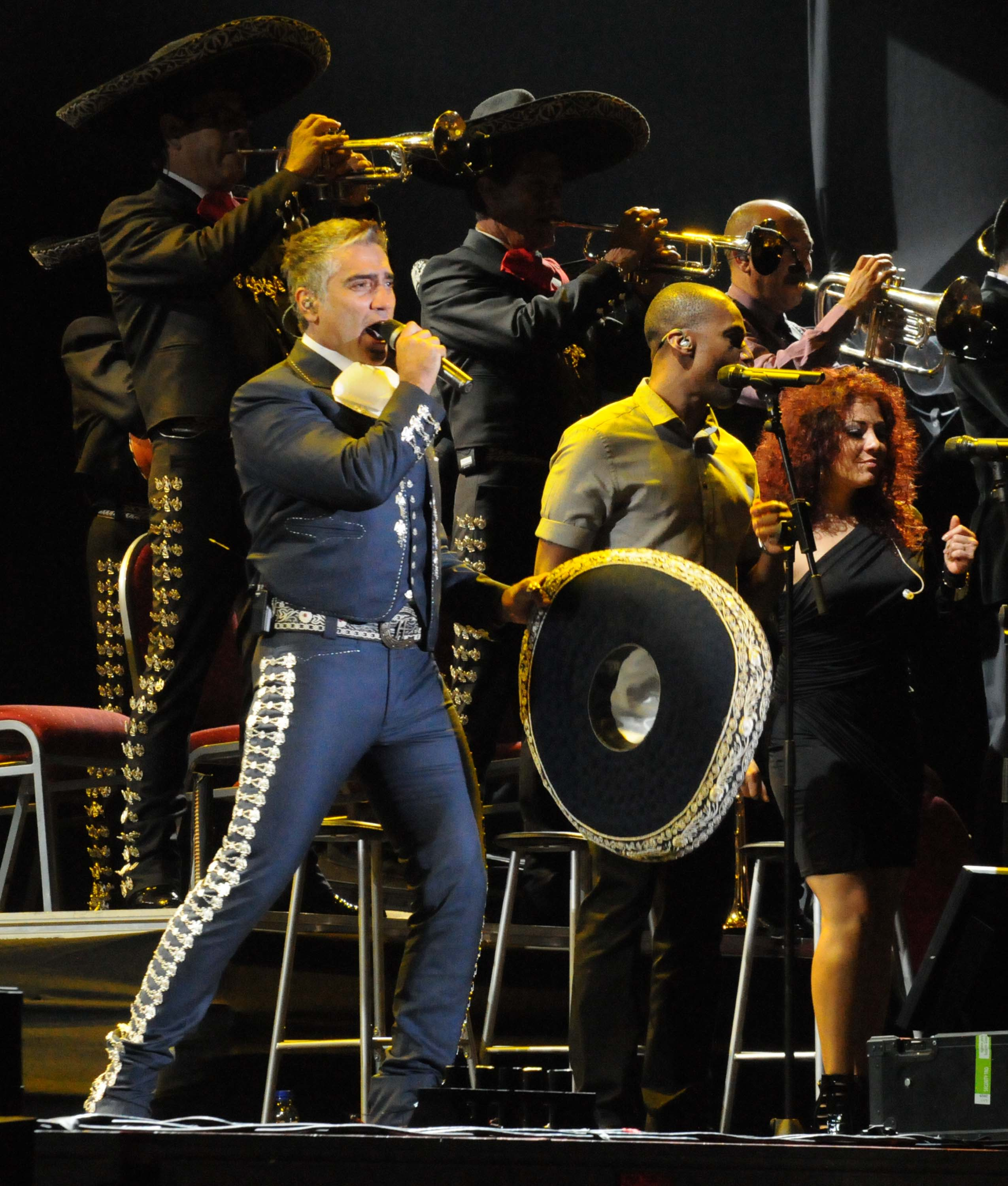
Alejandro Fernández

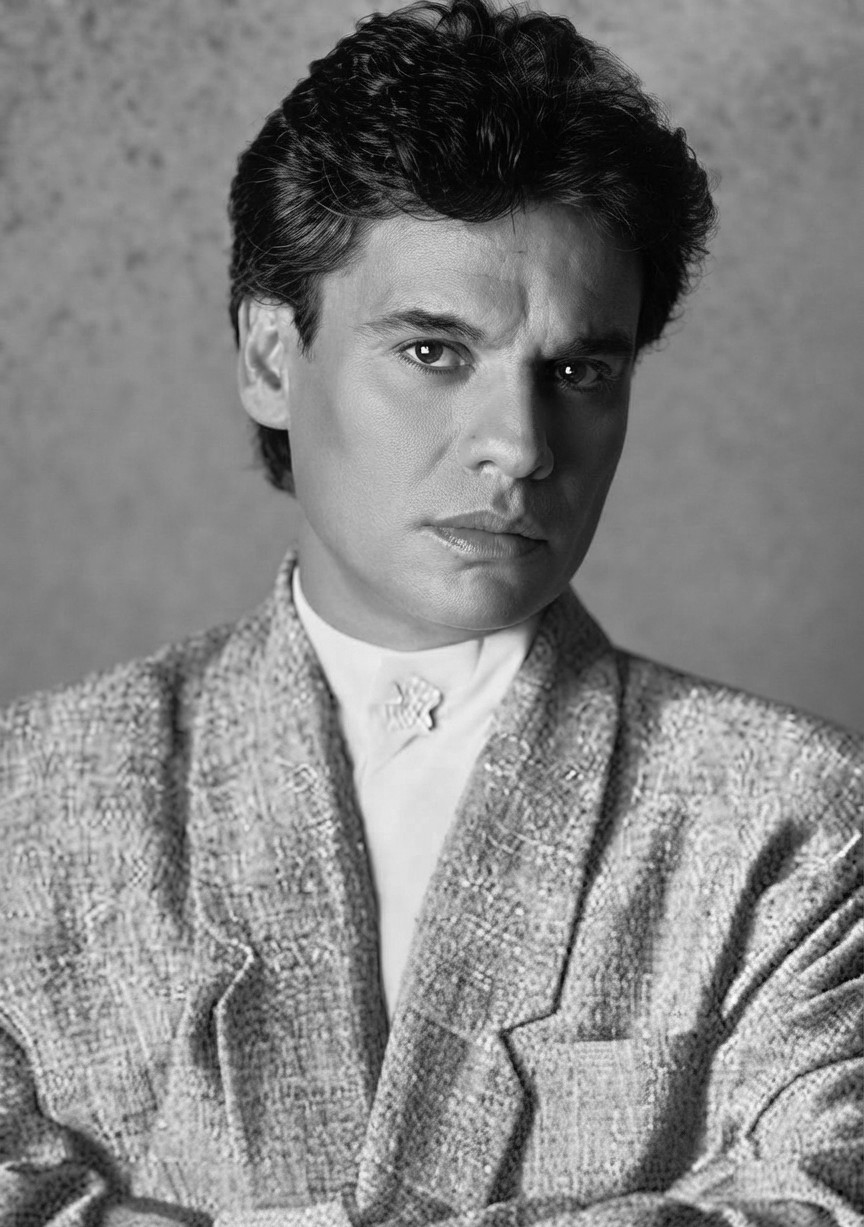
Juan Gabriel

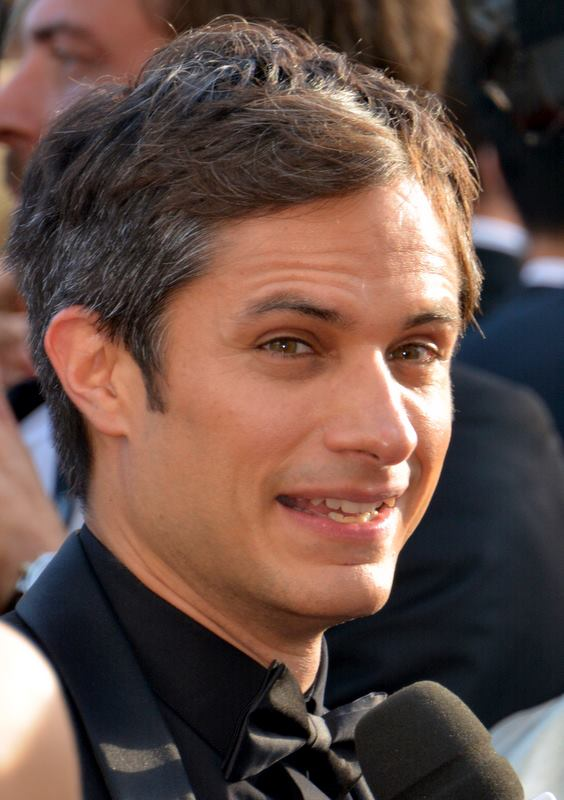
Gael García Bernal

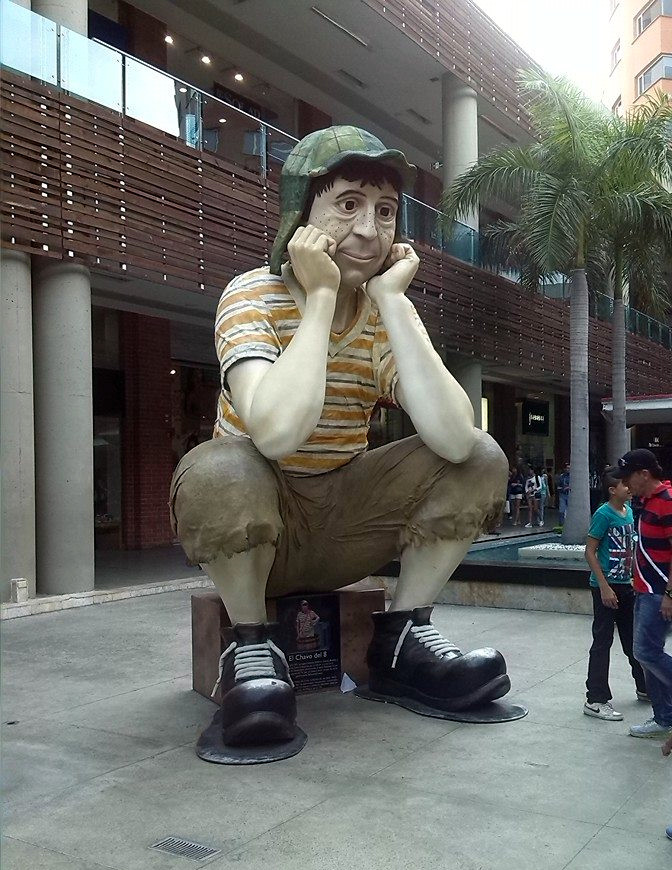
Roberto Gómez Bolaños

- Ricardo de Pascual, actor
- Ana Díaz, singer
- Dolores del Río, actress
- Yolanda del Río, singer
- Guillermo del Toro, film director
- Gonzalo de la Torre, singer, producer
- Eugenio Derbez, actor, comedian, producer
- Aarón Díaz, actor
- Columba Domínguez, actress
- Marta Domingo, soprano singer
- Plácido Domingo Jr., movie actor, singer
- Susana Dosamantes, actress
- Lila Downs, singer
- Dulce María, actress, singer, composer
- Jean Duverger, actor, show host
- Elán, singer-songwriter
- Fernando Eimbcke, film director, screenwriter
- Emilio Echevarría, actor
- Liza Echeverría, model, show host
- Alfredo Gatica, actor
- Luis Gatica, actor
- Erick Elías, actor, model
- Evangelina Elizondo, actress
- Emmanuel, singer
- Marlene Favela, actress
- Luis Ernesto Franco, actor
- Lorena Enríquez, actress
- José Guadalupe Esparza, singer
- María Félix, actress
- Alejandro Fernández, singer
- Pedro Fernández, singer-songwriter, actor, composer, producer
- Vicente Fernández, singer
- Juan Ferrara, actor
- Laura Flores, actress
- Adriana Fonseca, actress
- Rubén Fuentes, actor
- Juan Gabriel, singer, composer
- Francisco Gabilondo Soler, "Cri-Cri", songwriter
- Gael García Bernal, actor
- Sara García, actress
- Eduardo Garza, voice actor
- Bibi Gaytán, actress
- Alfredo Gil, singer, guitarist, founding member of Trio los Panchos
- Filippa Giordano, crossover singer
- Ernesto Gómez Cruz, actor
- Roberto Gómez Bolaños Chespirito, actor, director, songwriter and screenwriter
- Alejandro González Iñárritu, film director
- Edith González, actress
- Sherlyn González, actress
- Susana González, actress
- Paulina Goto, actress, singer
- Ely Guerra, singer-songwriter, musician, composer
- Denisse Guerrero, singer
- Emilia Guiú, actress
- Elizabeth Gutiérrez, actress
- Alejandra Guzmán, singer
- Enrique Guzmán, singer
- Vanessa Guzmán, actress, model

=== H–M ===
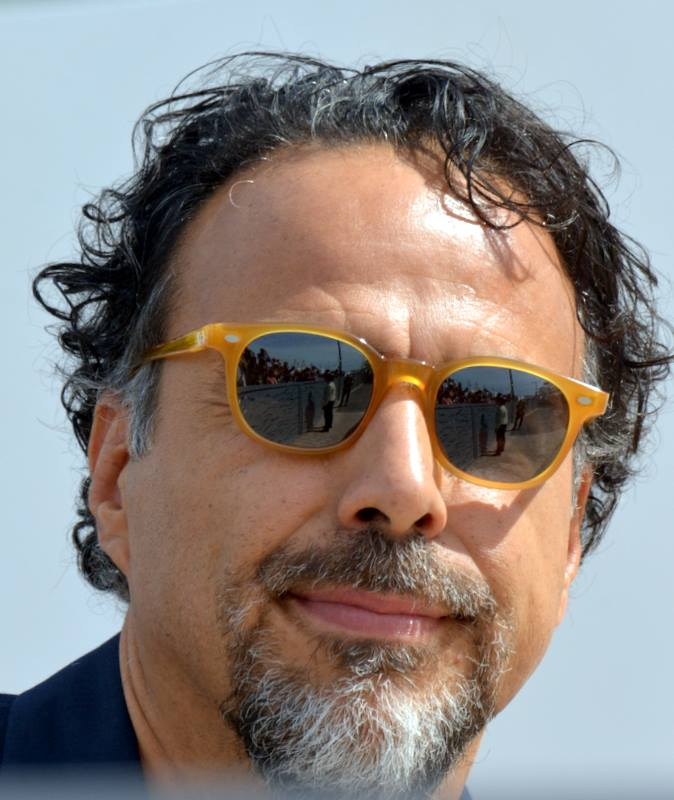
Alejandro González Iñárritu

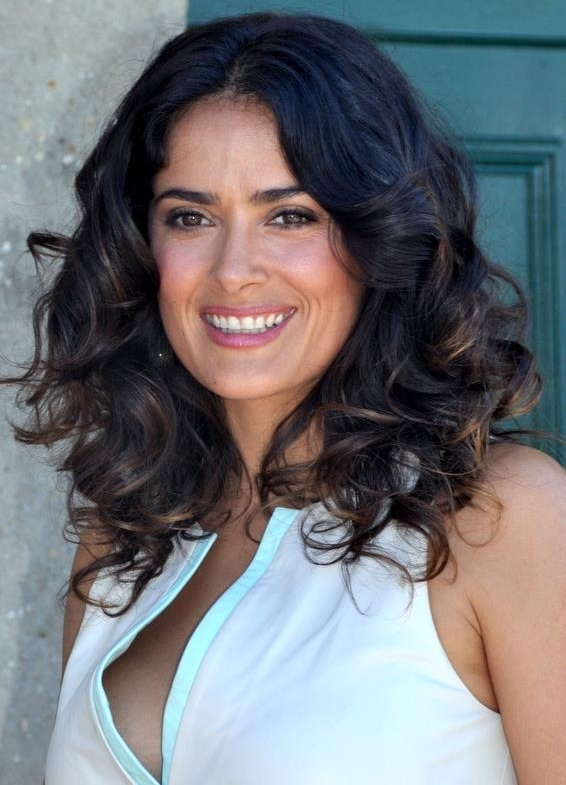
Salma Hayek

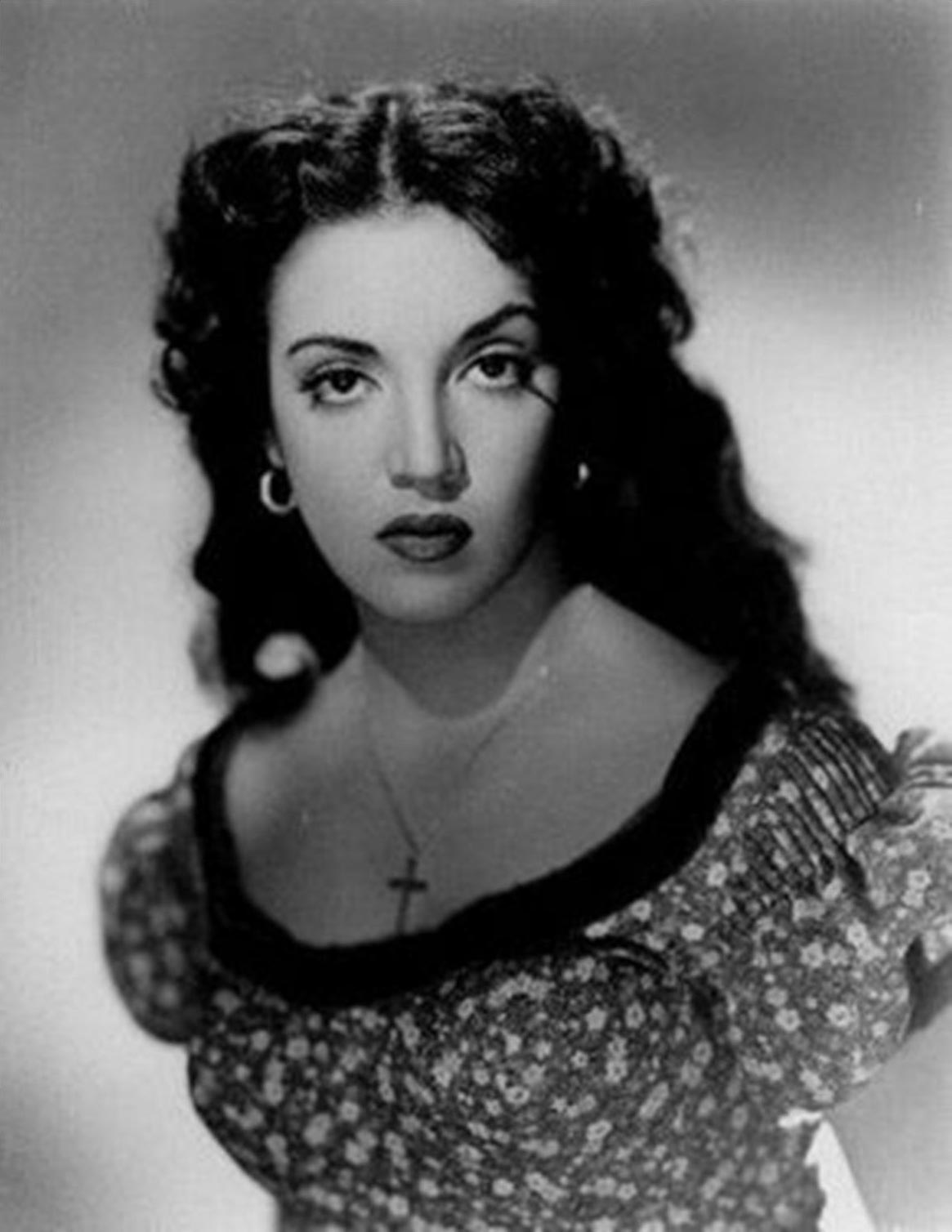
Katy Jurado

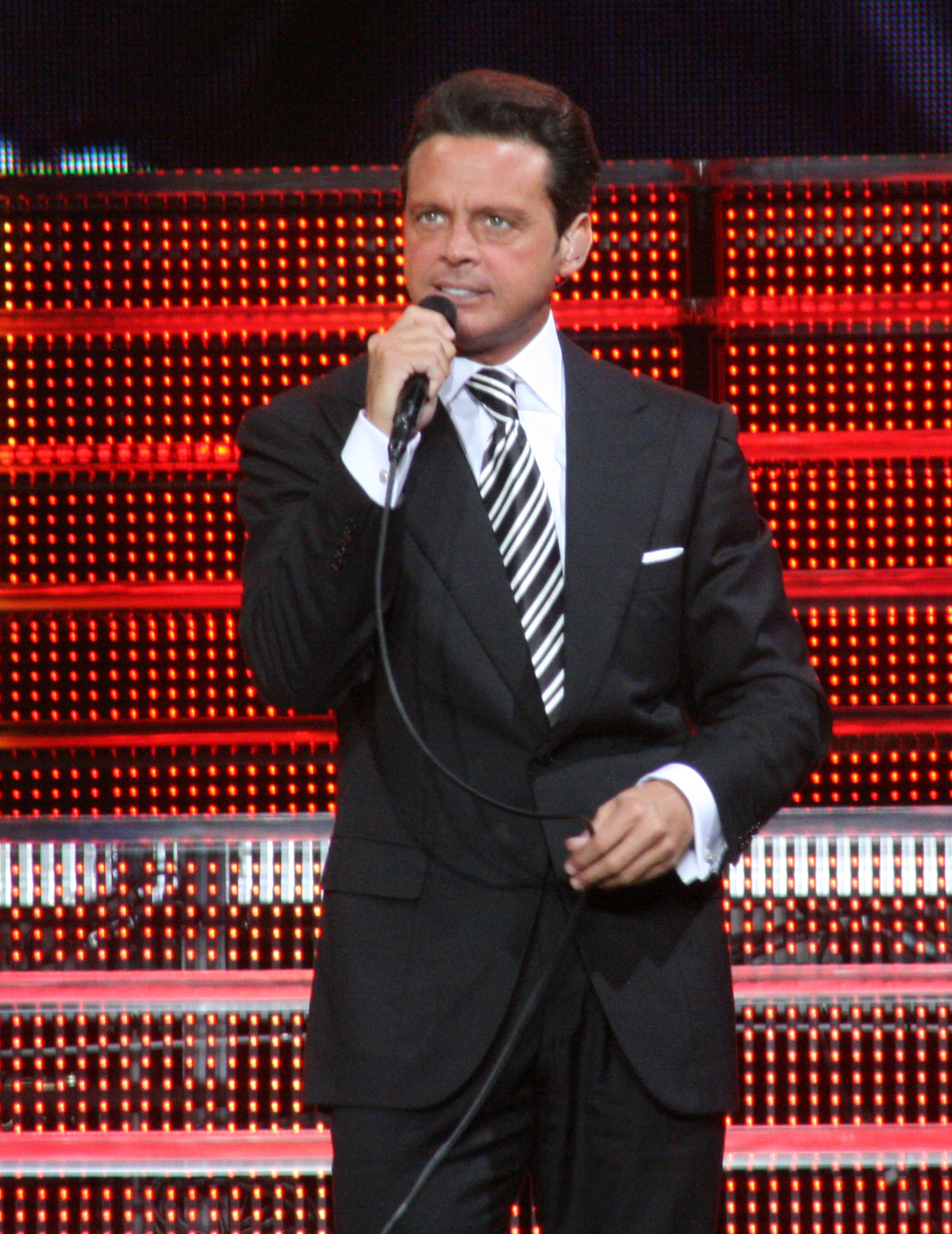
Luis Miguel

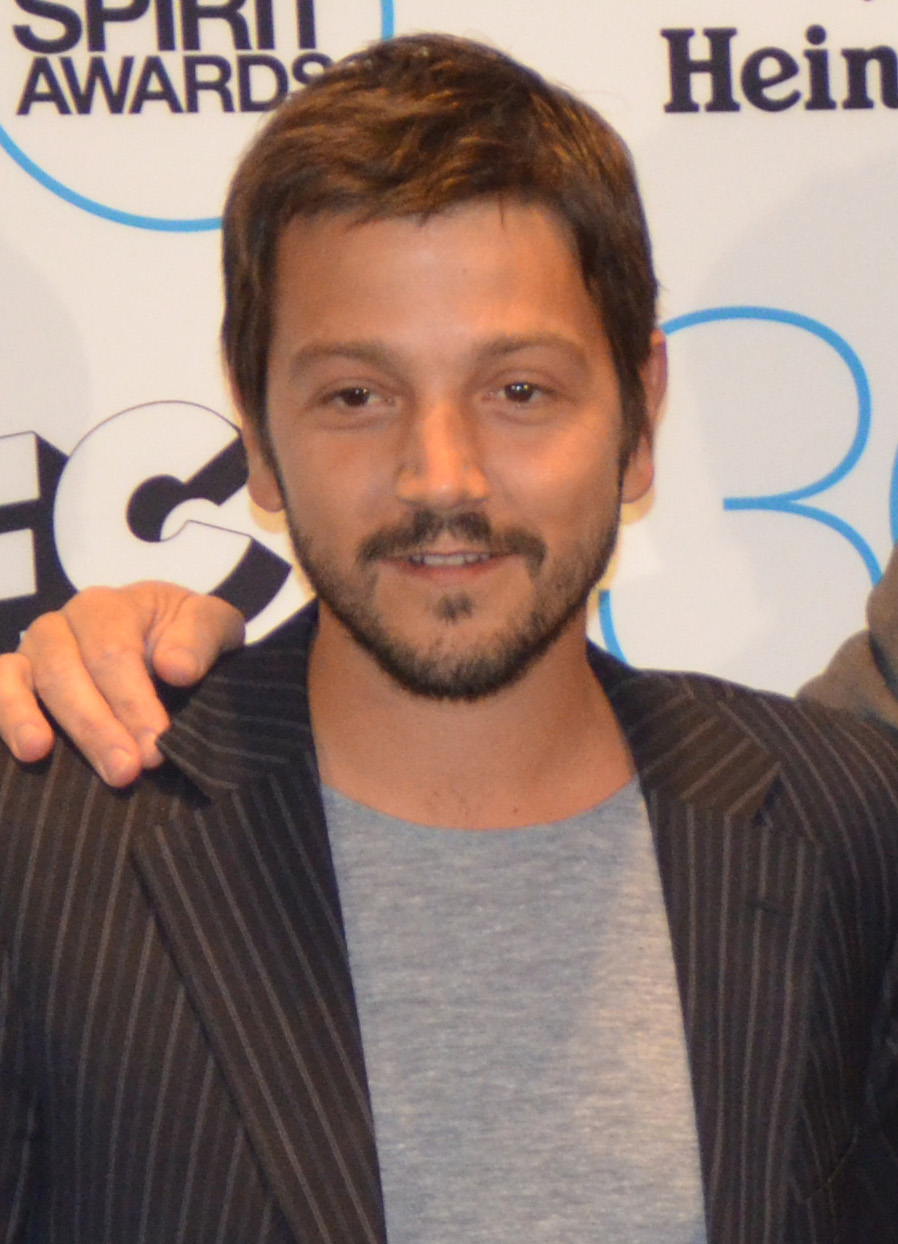
Diego Luna

- Laura Harring, actress
- Hector Soberon, actor
- Salma Hayek, actress
- Plutarco Haza, actor
- Gaspar Henaine Capulina, actor and comedian
- Saul Hernández, singer
- Carlos Hernández Vázquez, film director
- Alfonso Herrera, actor, singer
- Lorena Herrera, actress
- Pedro Infante, singer, actor
- Mauricio Islas, actor
- Frankie J, singer
- Altair Jarabo, actress
- Rodolfo Jiménez, actor
- José Alfredo Jiménez, singer-songwriter, musician, composer
- José José, singer
- Lupita Jones, Miss Universe 1991
- Judith Grace, show host
- Katy Jurado, actress
- Ines Gomez Mont, television host
- Kalimba, singer
- Natalia Lafourcade, singer
- Imanol Landeta, actor, singer
- Valentino Lanús, actor
- Norma Lazareno, actress
- Ana Layevska, actress
- Mariana Levy, actress
- Iyari Limon, actress
- Issa Lish, model
- Claudia Lizaldi, model
- Patricia Llaca, actress
- Xavier López, Chabelo, actor
- Jesús León, tenor
- Renato López, musician, show host
- Seidy López, actress
- Alex Lora, musician, singer-songwriter
- Ana Lorena Sánchez, actress
- Adriana Louvier, actress
- Karyme Lozano, actress
- Lucero, actress, singer
- Luis Miguel, singer
- Daniela Luján, actress, singer
- Ernesto Laguardia, actor
- Fernando Luján, actor
- Diego Luna, actor, director
- Litzy, actress, singer
- Tony MacFarland, actor
- Sara Maldonado, actress, comedian
- Julio Mannino, actor
- Patricia Manterola, singer
- Erik Mariñelarena, film director
- María Elena Marqués, actress
- Adalberto Martínez Resortes, comedian and actor
- Karla Martínez, show host
- Ingrid Martz, actress
- Ofelia Medina, actress
- Manuel Medel, actor
- Tenoch Huerta Mejia, actor
- Bill Melendez, animator
- Lucía Méndez, actress, singer
- Florinda Meza, actress
- Jaydy Michel, fashion model
- Miroslava, actress
- Maya Mishalska, actress
- Nicky Mondellini, actress
- Ricardo Montalbán, actor
- Pilar Montenegro, actress, singer
- Pablo Montero, singer, actor
- Ivonne Montero, actress
- Andrés Montiel, actor
- Galilea Montijo, actress
- Mario Moreno Cantinflas, actor and comedian
- Bárbara Mori, actress, model
- Sabine Moussier, actress
- Lisette Morelos, actress
- Marco Antonio Muñiz, singer
- Evita Muñoz, actress, comedian, singer
- Eduardo Manzano, actor
- René Muñoz, actor
- Úrsula Murayama, actress

=== N–R ===
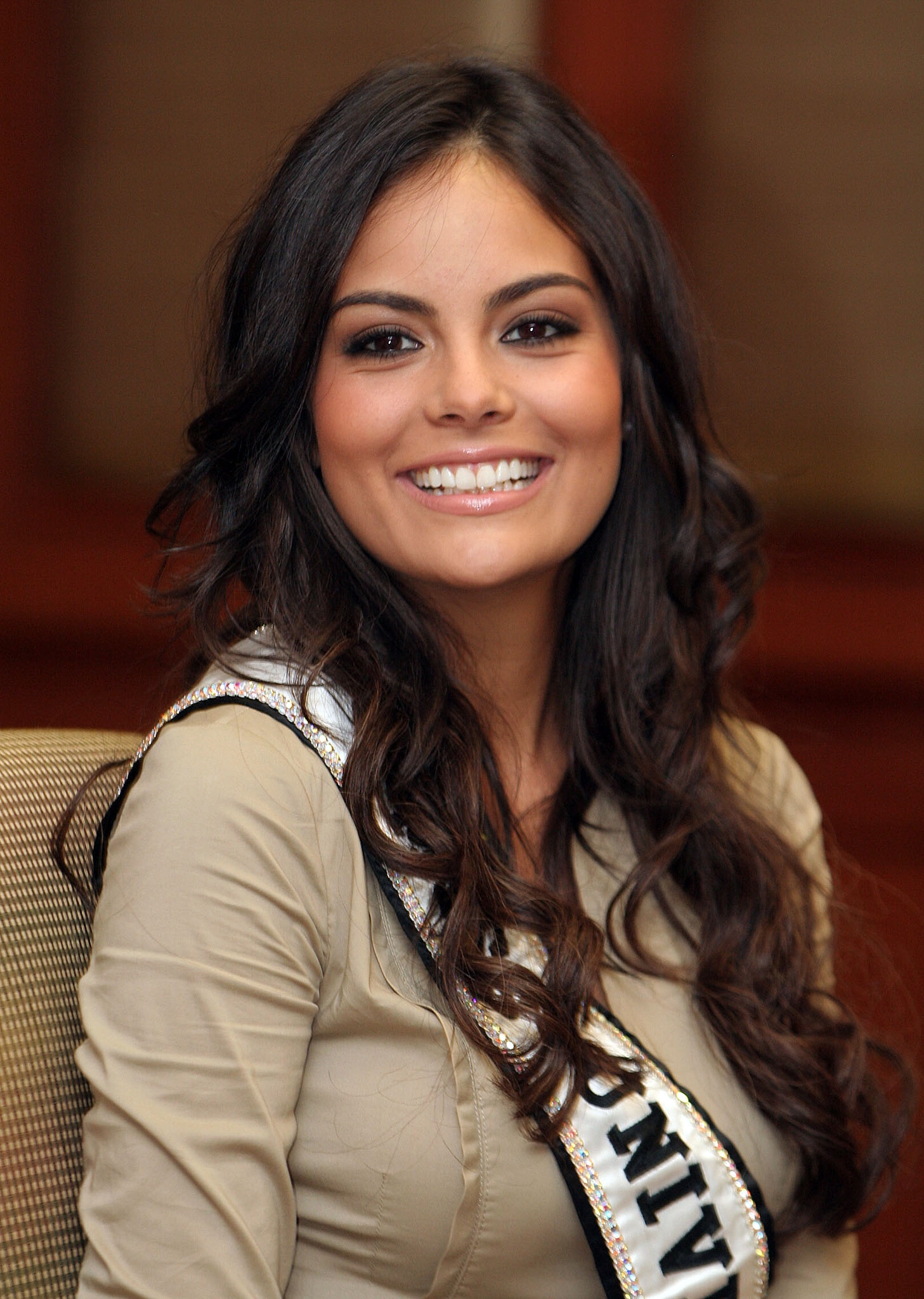
Ximena Navarrete

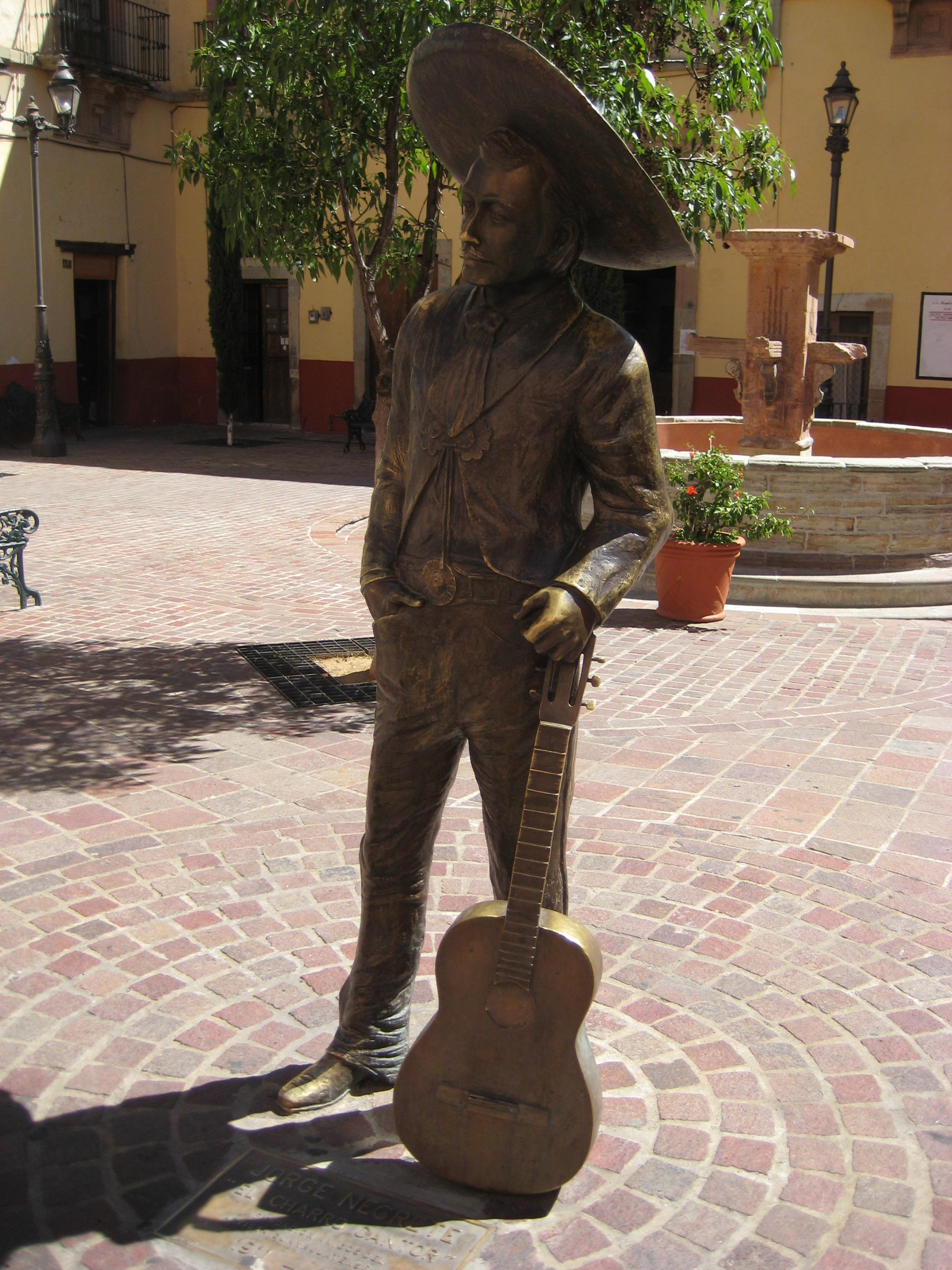
Jorge Negrete

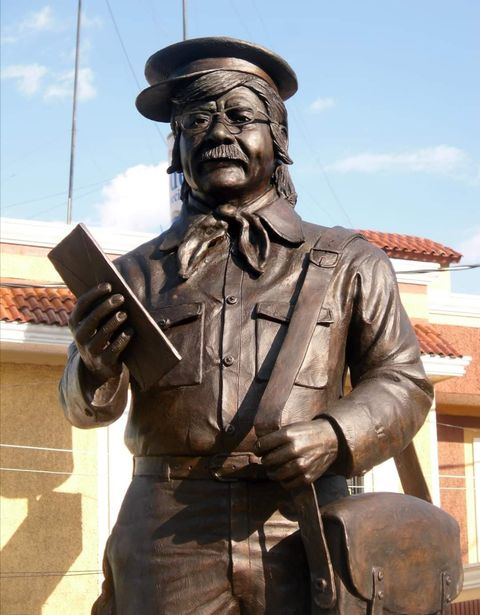
Raúl Padilla

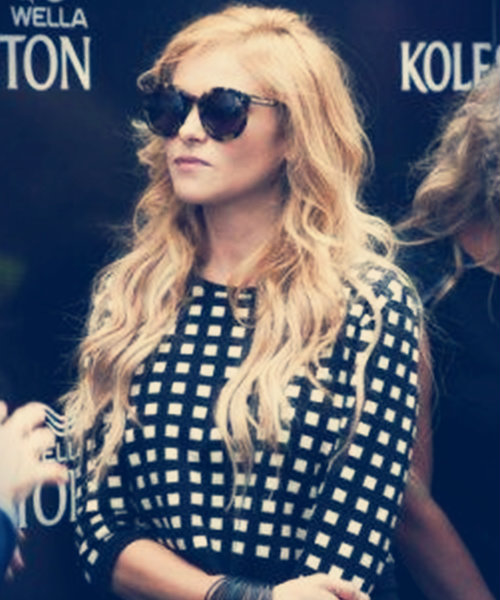
Paulina Rubio

- Ximena Navarrete, model, Miss Universe 2010
- Chucho Navarro, singer, guitarist, founding member of Trio Los Panchos
- Guillermo Navarro, cinematographer
- Sylvia Navarro, actress
- Patricia Navidad, actress
- Jorge Negrete, singer, actor
- Mónica Noguera, television host, model
- Adela Noriega, actress
- Manuel "Manolo" Noriega, stage and film actor
- Nailea Norvind, actress
- Ramón Novarro, actor
- Lupita Nyong'o, actress
- Ona Grauer, actress
- Manuel Ojeda, actor
- Adrian Olivares, singer; former member of Menudo and the older brother of Actress Karla Souza
- Fher Olvera, singer
- Mauricio Ochmann, actor
- Yahir Othon, actor, singer
- Raúl Chato Padilla, actor
- Dominika Paleta, actress
- Ludwika Paleta, actress
- Andrea Palma, actress
- Joaquín Pardavé, actor, director, songwriter and screenwriter
- Plankton Man, musician
- Silvia Pasquel, actress
- Arturo Peniche, actor
- Maite Perroni, actress, singer
- Silvia Pinal, actress, show host
- Salvador Pineda, actor
- Polo Polo, comedian
- María Antonieta Pons, actress
- Enrique Rambal, actor
- Adal Ramones, comedian
- Marco Antonio Regil, television host
- Miguel Alejandro Reina, film director
- Diana Reyes, singer
- Carlos Reygadas, film director, winner of the Best Director Award in Cannes
- Cornelio Reyna, singer
- Pilar Rioja, dancer
- Lalo Ríos, Mexican-born American actor
- Angélica Rivera, actress
- Jorge Rivero, actor
- Aurora Robles, supermodel
- Enrique Rocha, actor
- Paul Rodriguez, comedian, actor
- Helena Rojo, actress
- María Rojo, actress
- Gilbert Roland, actor
- Daniela Romo, actress, singer
- Rosa Carmina. actress
- Alessandra Rosaldo, actress, singer
- Rodrigo De la Rosa, actor
- Paulina Rubio, singer
- Ximena Rubio, actress
- Victoria Ruffo, actress

=== S–Z ===
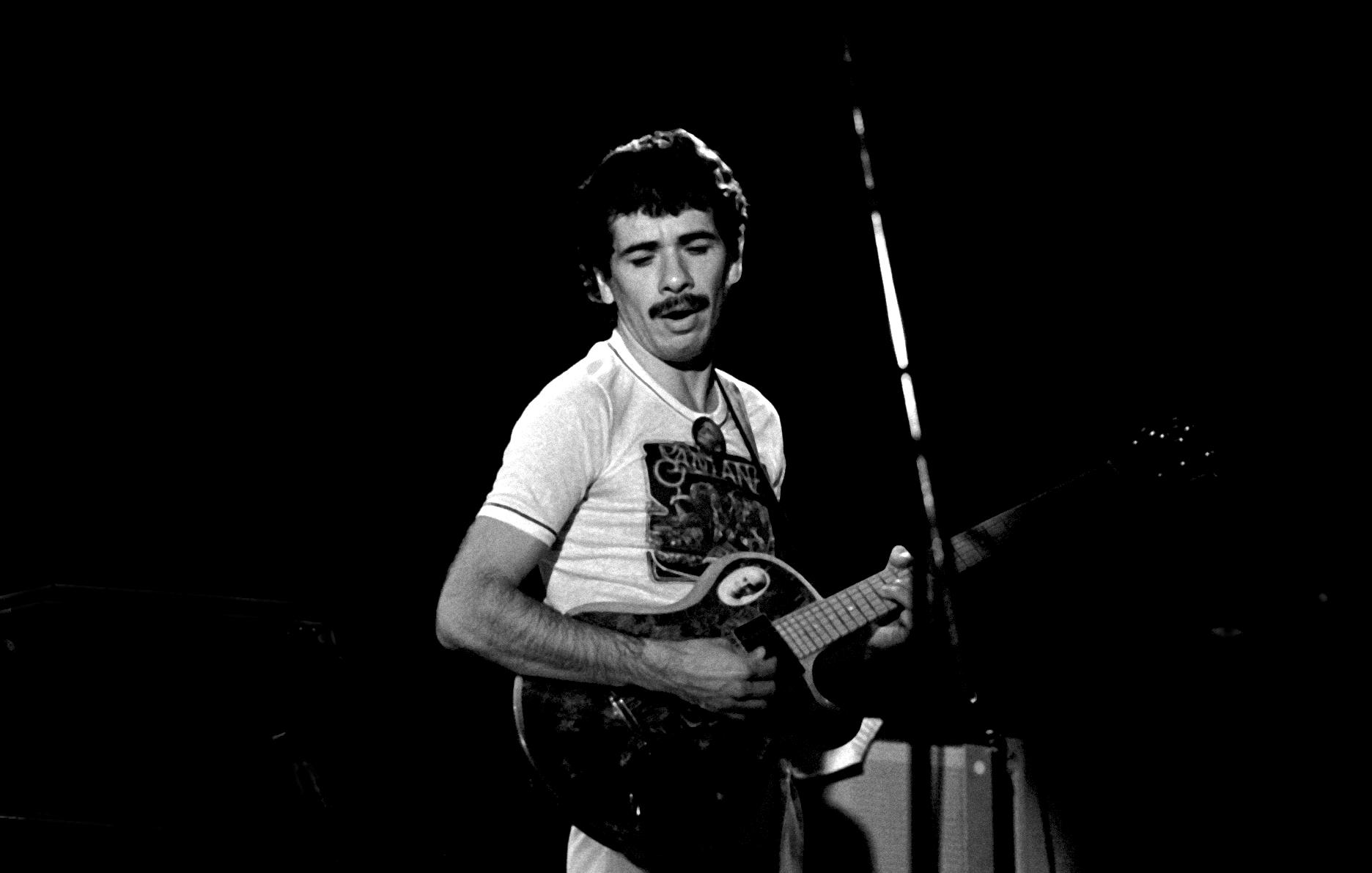
Carlos Santana

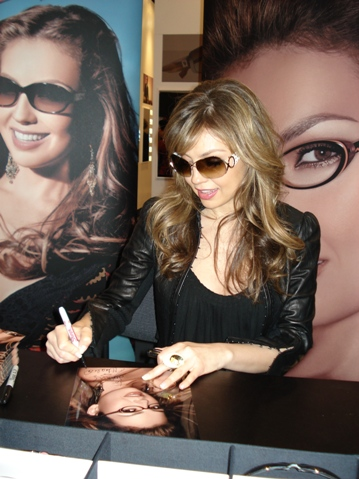
Thalía

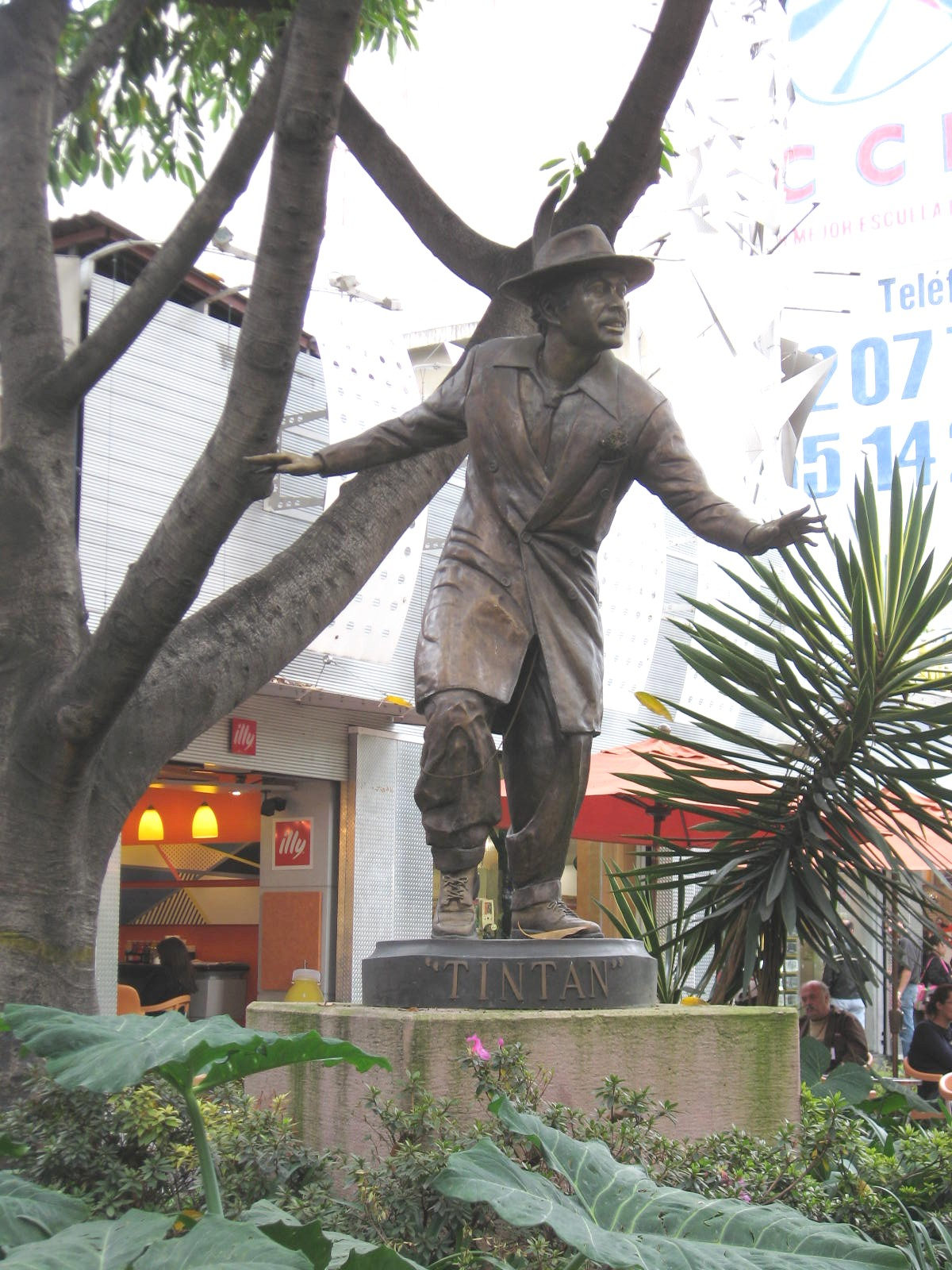
Germán Valdés

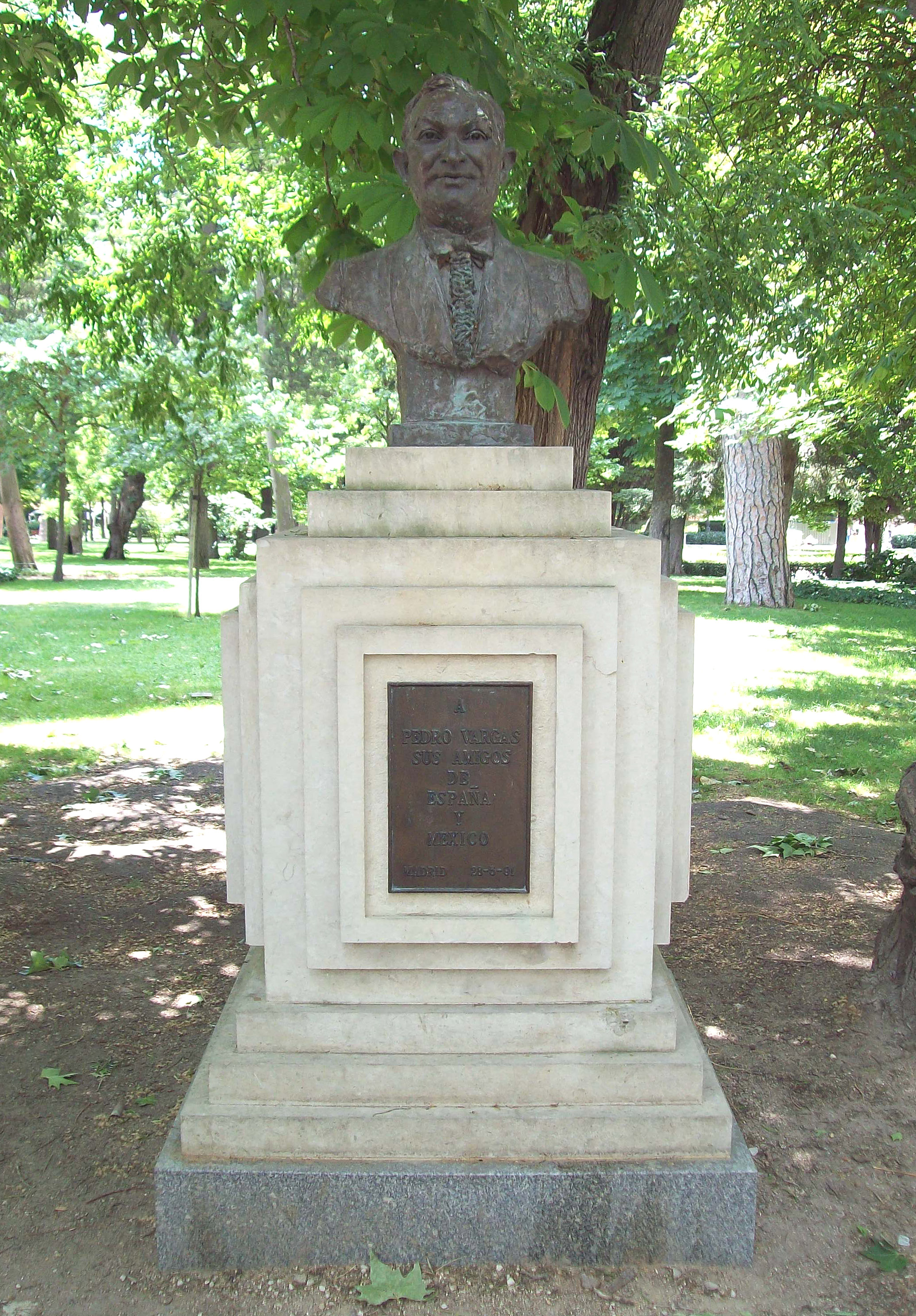
Pedro Vargas

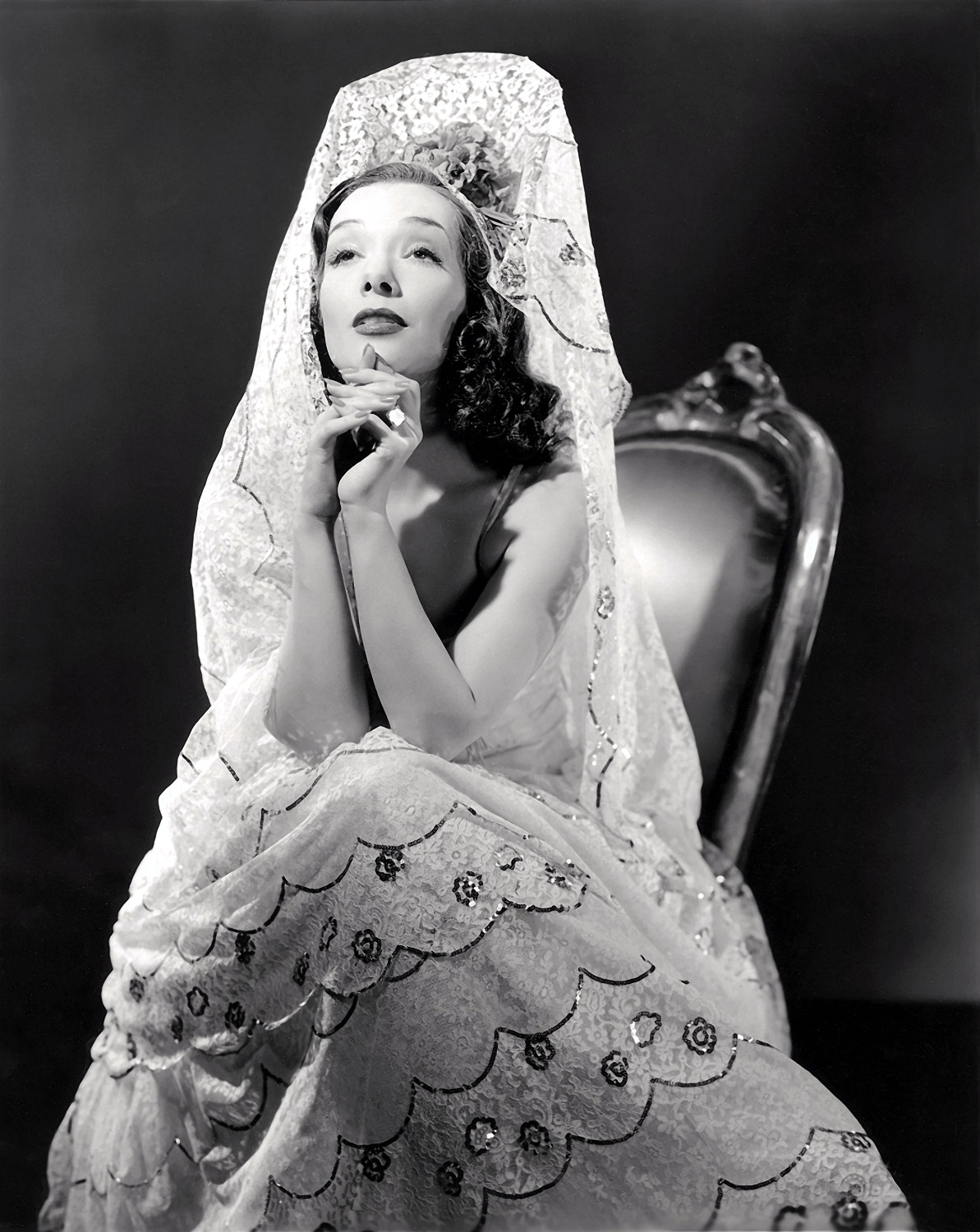
Lupe Vélez

- Jorge Salinas, actor
- Nora Salinas, actress
- Carlos Santana, musician
- Pablo Santos, actor
- Eugenio Siller, actor
- Joan Sebastian, singer
- Mariana Seoane, singer
- Ana Serradilla, actress
- Antonio Serrano, director
- Karol Sevilla, actress, singer
- Camila Sodi, actress
- Sasha Sokol, singer
- Fernando Soler, actor
- Juan Soler, actor
- Javier Solís, singer
- Marco Antonio Solís, singer
- Blanca Soto, fashion model
- Gabriel Soto, actor, model
- Karla Souza, actress
- Hugo Stiglitz, actor
- Devin Tailes, singer
- Mark Tacher, actor
- Ana Claudia Talancón, actress
- Mario Talavera, songwriter
- Amado Tame Shear, Mexican politician
- Tatiana, singer
- Ari Telch, actor
- Arleth Terán, actress
- Thalía, actress, singer
- Lynda Thomas, musician, singer-songwriter
- Thelma Tixou, vedette
- José Antonio Torres, film director
- Lupita Tovar, actress
- Rigo Tovar, singer-songwriter, composer, actor
- Gloria Trevi, singer
- Mariana Treviño, actress
- Víctor Trujillo / Brozo, actor, comedian
- Emilio Tuero, actor, singer
- Elyfer Torres, actress
- Christopher Uckermann, actor, singer
- Polo Urías, singer
- Germán Valdés, Tin Tán, actor
- Ramón Valdés, don Ramón, actor
- Victor Noriega, actor, singer, model
- Angélica Vale, actress, singer, comedian
- Verónica Valerio, singer, harpist and composer
- Sergio Vallín, guitarist
- Pedro Vargas, singer
- Karen Vega, fashion model
- María Elena Velasco La India María, actress, comedian
- Lorena Velázquez, actress
- Raúl Velasco, entertainer and television producer
- Lupe Vélez, actress
- Julieta Venegas, singer-songwriter, composer, musician
- Eduardo Verástegui, actor, model
- Carlos Villagrán, actor
- David Villalpando, actor
- Mayrín Villanueva, actress
- Alicia Villarreal, singer
- Edgar Vivar, actor
- Kat Von D, model, musician, tattoo artist
- Eduardo Victoria, actor
- Gonzalo Garcia Vivanco, actor
- Nena von Schlebrügge, fashion model
- Laisha Wilkins, actress
- Laura Zapata, actress
- Jesús Zavala, actor, singer
- David Zepeda, actor
- Humberto Zurita, actor

== Historians, economists and social scientists ==
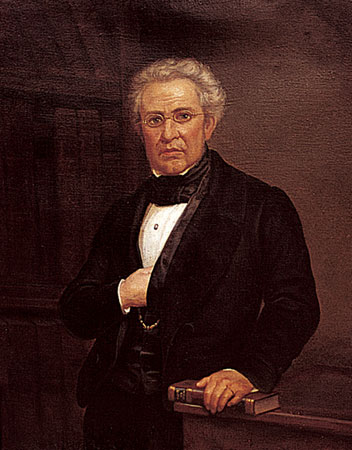
Lucas Alamán

- Lucas Alamán
- Ramón Alcaraz
- Francisco Javier Clavijero
- Francisco del Paso y Troncoso
- Everardo Elizondo
- Omar Guerrero
- Clara Jusidman
- Ricardo Lancaster-Jones y Verea
- Miguel León-Portilla
- Eduardo Matos Moctezuma, archaeologist
- Jean Meyer
- Edmundo O'Gorman
- Alejandro Peschard Fernández
- Armand Peschard-Sverdrup
- Jacqueline Peschard
- Pedro Thomas Ruiz de Velasco
- Fernando Escalante Gonzalbo, sociologist

== Human rights activists ==
- Sergio Aguayo
- Ociel Baena
- Alberta Cariño
- Susana Chávez
- Rosario Ibarra
- Sanjuana Martínez

== Intellectuals and writers ==
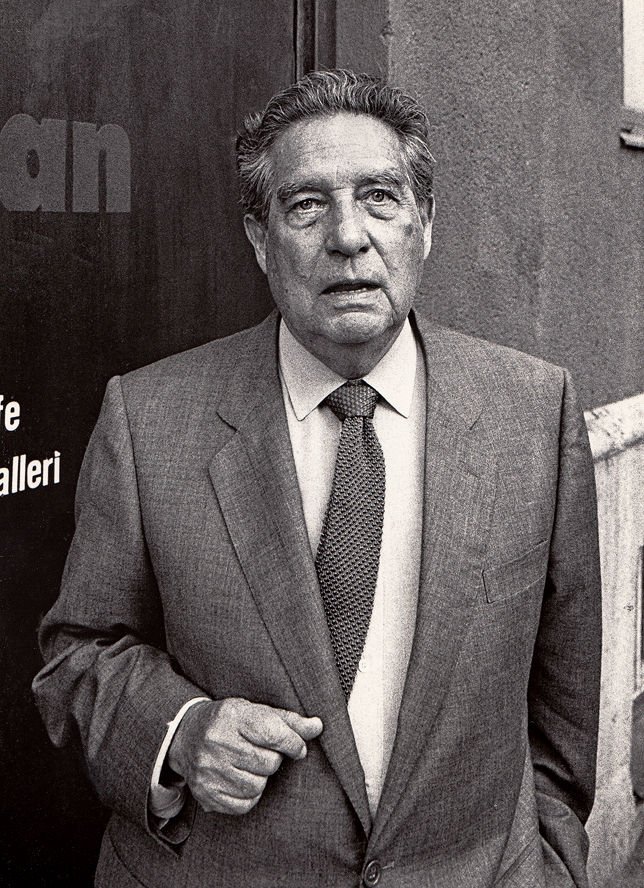
Octavio Paz

- Héctor Aguilar Camín
- Gabriel Careaga Medina
- Mariano Azuela
- Edmundo Cetina Velázquez, philosopher
- Daniel Cosío Villegas
- Fernando del Paso, Cervantes Prize winner
- Germán Dehesa
- Salvador Elizondo
- Juan Escoto
- Carlos Fuentes, Cervantes Prize winner
- Jorge Ibargüengoitia
- Alfonso García Robles, winner of the Nobel Peace Prize in 1982
- Enrique Krauze
- Mario Ojeda Gómez
- Tony Olmos, screenwriter and filmmaker
- Octavio Paz, winner of the 1990 Nobel Prize for Literature
- Alfonso Reyes
- Juan Rulfo
- Moises Saenz
- Juan Manuel Silva Camarena, philosopher, professor and academic
- José Vasconcelos
- Gabriel Zaid

== Journalists ==
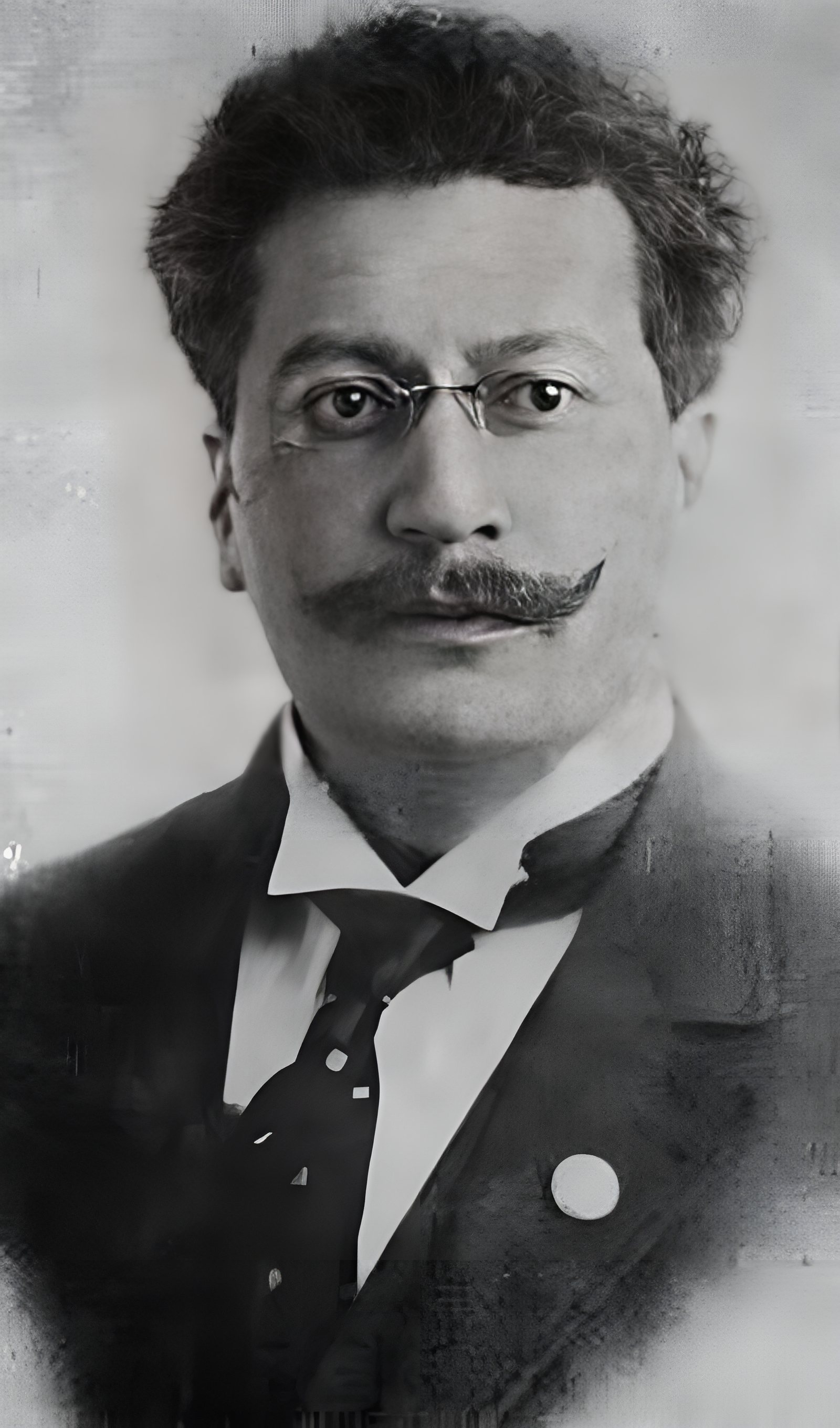
Ricardo Flores Magón

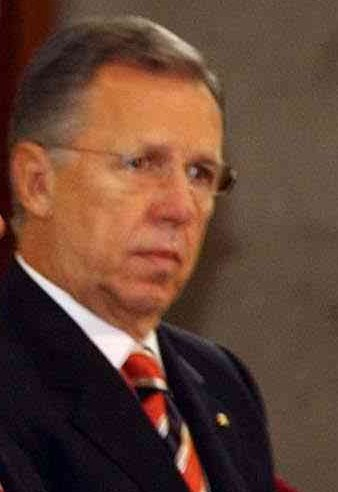
Joaquin López-Doriga

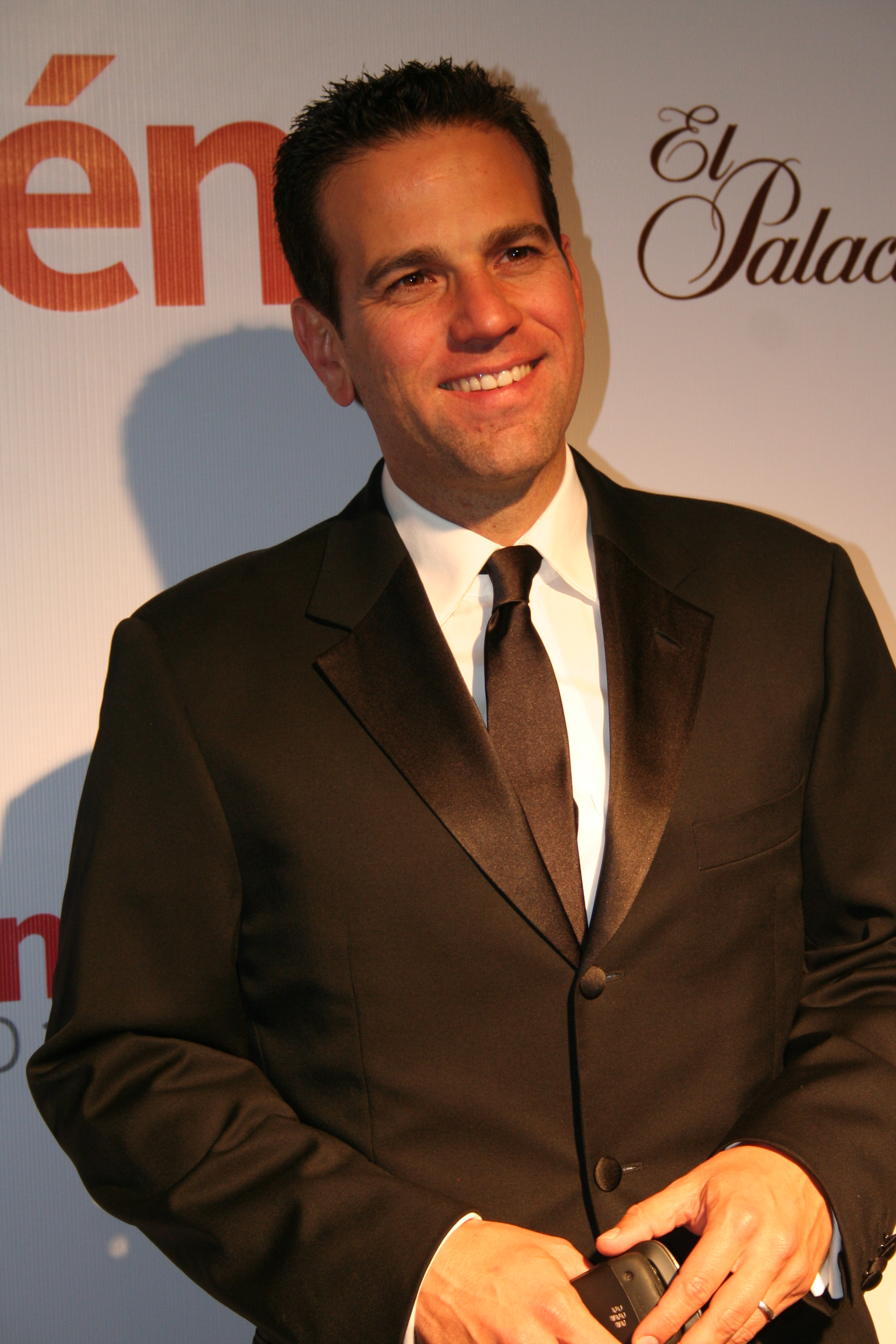
Carlos Loreth de Mola

- Carmen Aristegui
- Jesús Blancornelas
- Manuel Buendía
- Lydia Cacho
- María Antonieta Collins
- Catalina D'Erzel
- Denise Dresser
- Javier Esteinou Madrid
- Isidro Fabela
- Giselle Fernández
- Pedro Ferriz de Con
- Pedro Ferriz Santacruz
- Ricardo Flores Magón
- Marco Lara Klahr
- Joaquín López-Dóriga
- Carlos Loret de Mola
- Adela Micha
- Margarita Michelena
- Reyna Haydee Ramírez
- Jorge Ramos
- Paola Rojas
- Javier Solórzano
- Lilly Téllez
- Ana Velia Guzmán
- Jacobo Zabludovsky

=== Sports journalists ===
- José Roberto Pepe Espinosa
- David Faitelson
- Inés Sainz
- Pedro El Mago Septién
- José Ramón Fernández (journalist)

== Military, revolutionaries and guerrilla (fighters) ==
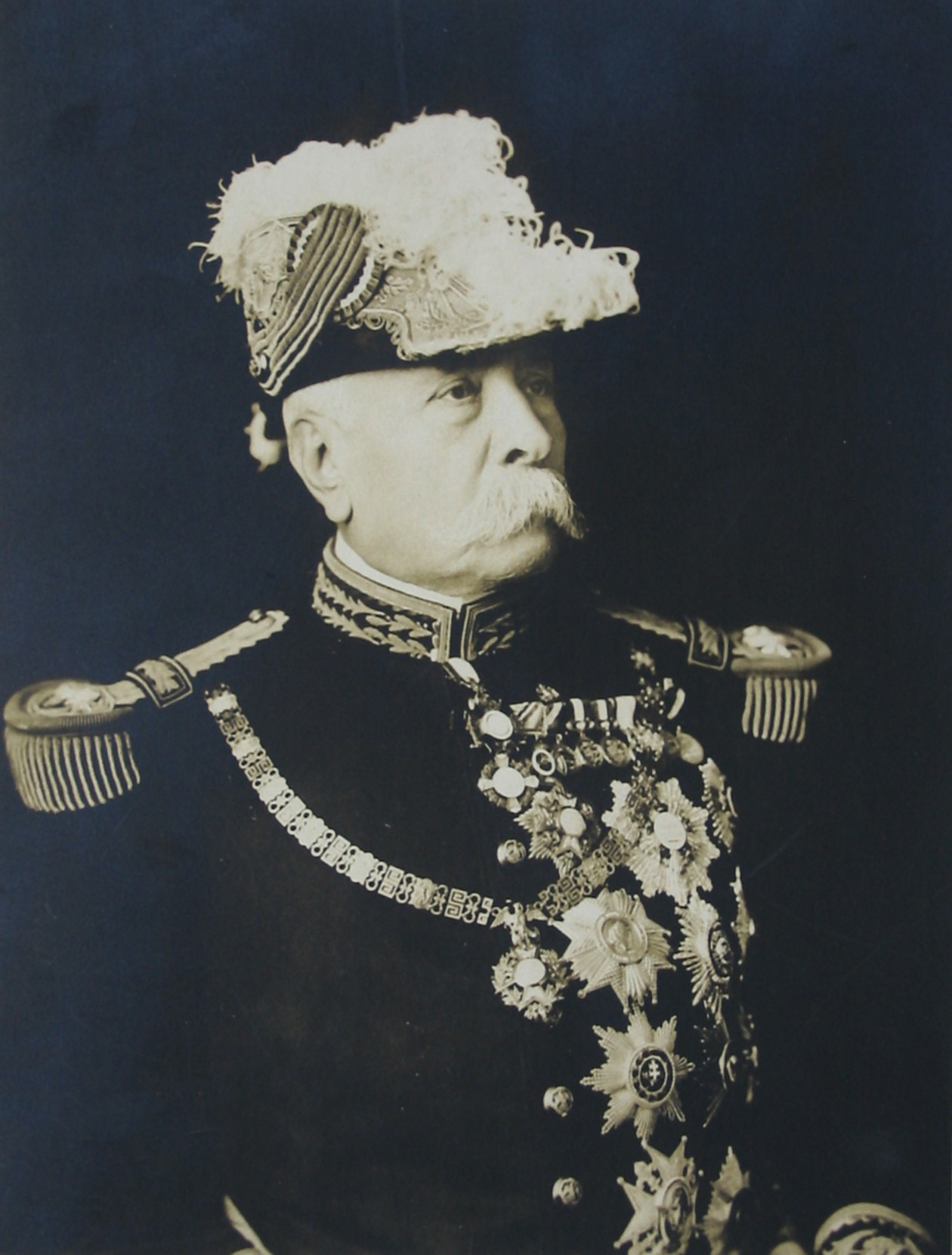
Porfirio Díaz

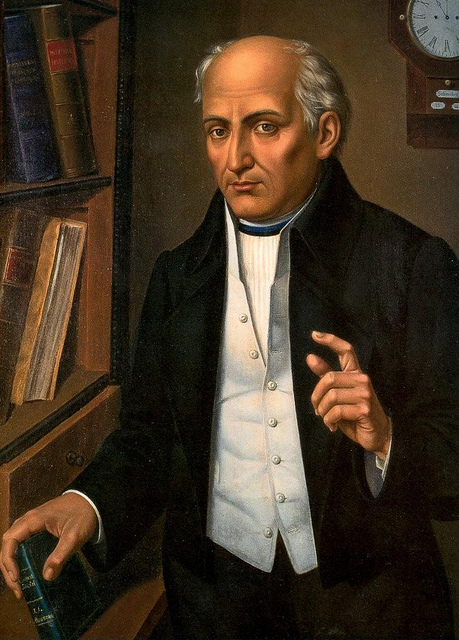
Miguel Hidalgo y Costilla

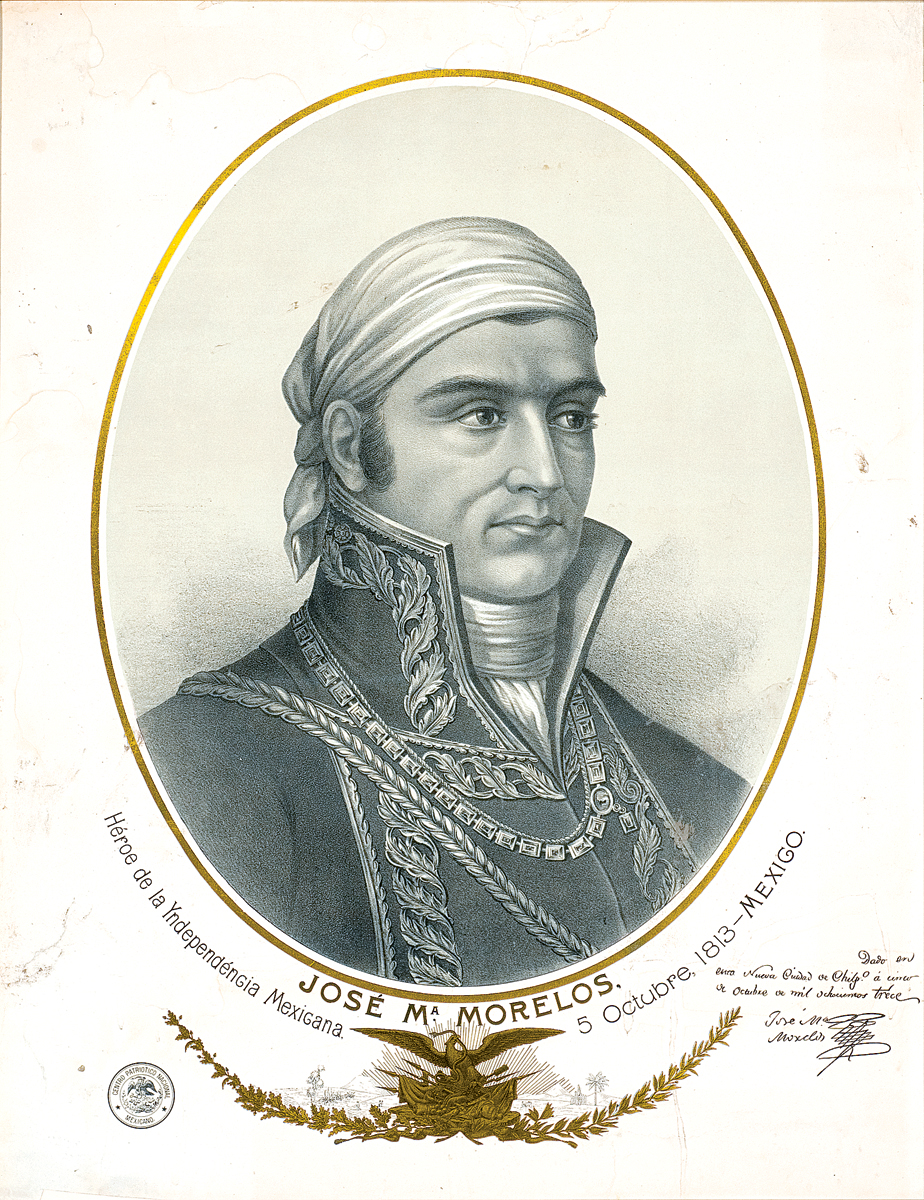
José María Morelos y Pavón

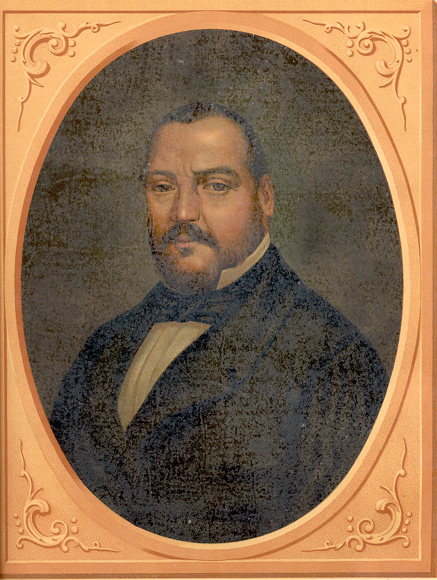
Ignacio Comonfort De Los Ríos

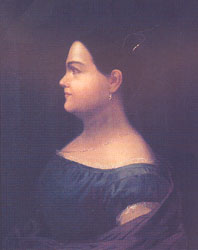
Leona Vicario

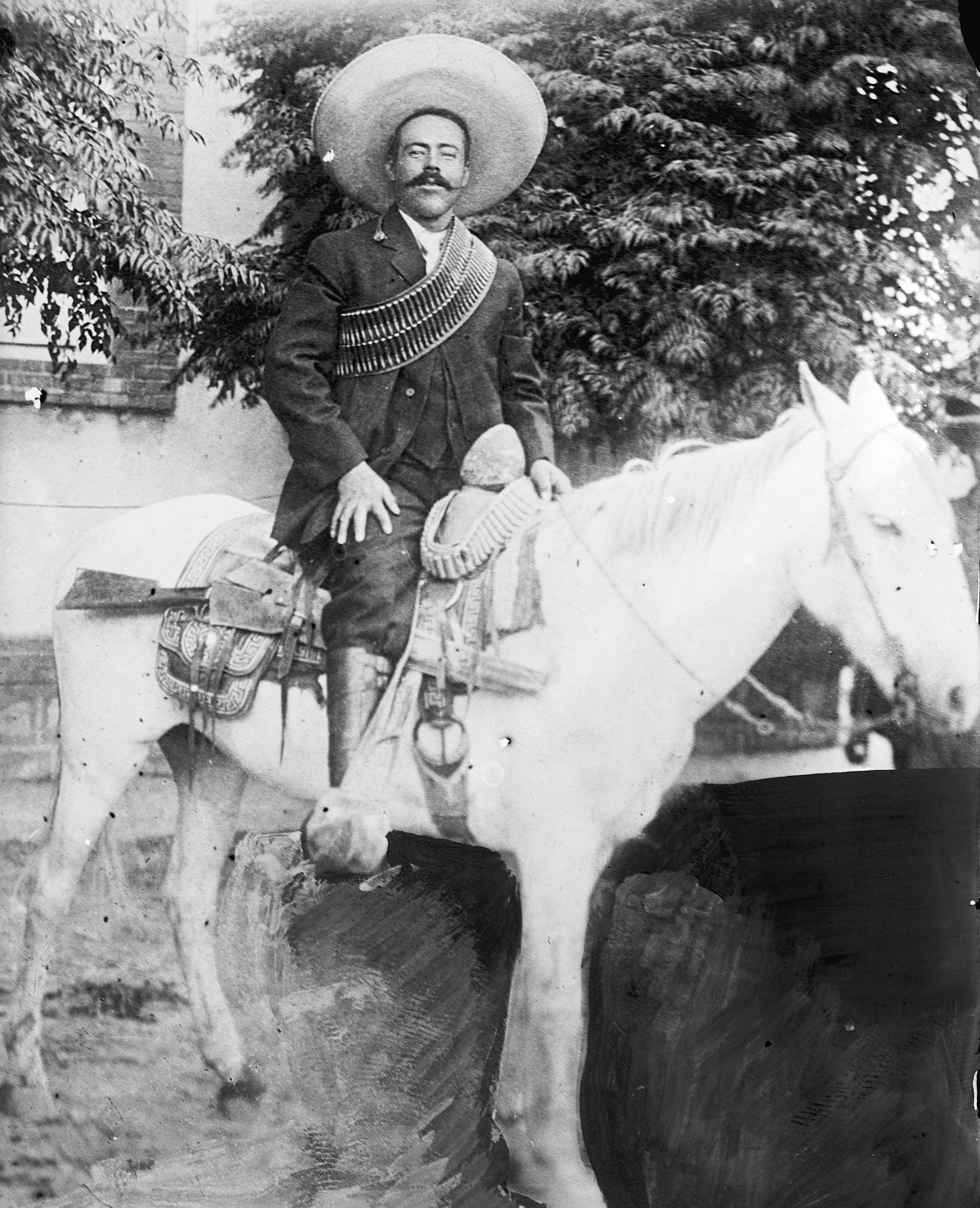
Pancho Villa

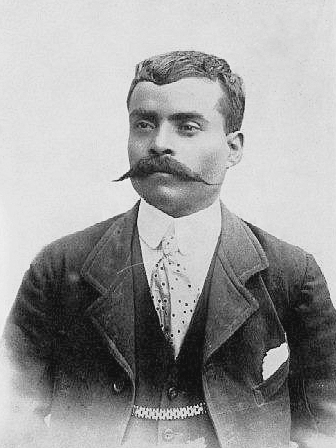
Emiliano Zapata

- Juan Aldama
- Ignacio Allende
- Atala Apodaca Anaya
- Felipe Ángeles
- Miguel Moreno Arreola
- José Azueta
- Lucio Cabañas
- Emilio Carranza
- Porfirio Díaz
- Mariano Escobedo
- Joaquín Fuero
- Ernesto García
- Enrique Gorostieta
- Vicente Guerrero
- Rafael Sebastián Guillén, Subcomandante Marcos
- Miguel Hidalgo y Costilla
- Victoriano Huerta
- José Mariano Jiménez
- Emilio Kosterlitzky
- Antonio López de Santa Anna
- Ignacio López Rayón
- Antonio Cárdenas Rodríguez
- Raúl Osiel Marroquín
- Mariano Matamoros
- José María Morelos y Pavón
- Victoriano "El Catorce" Ramírez
- Ignacio Gregorio Comonfort de los Ríos
- Fausto Vega Santander
- Jerónimo Treviño
- Leona Vicario
- Pancho Villa
- Emiliano Zapata

== Monarchs ==
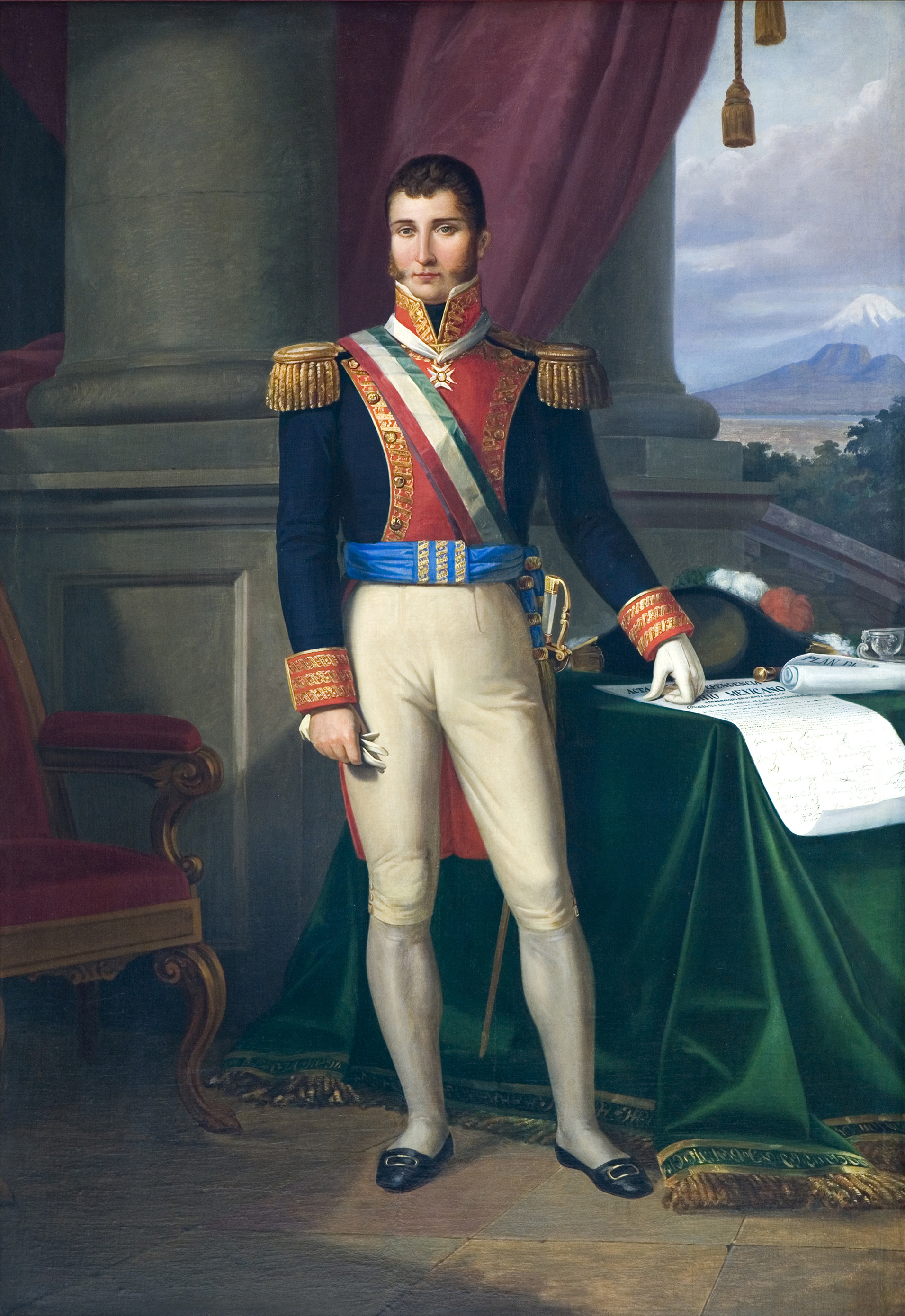
Emperor Agustin I

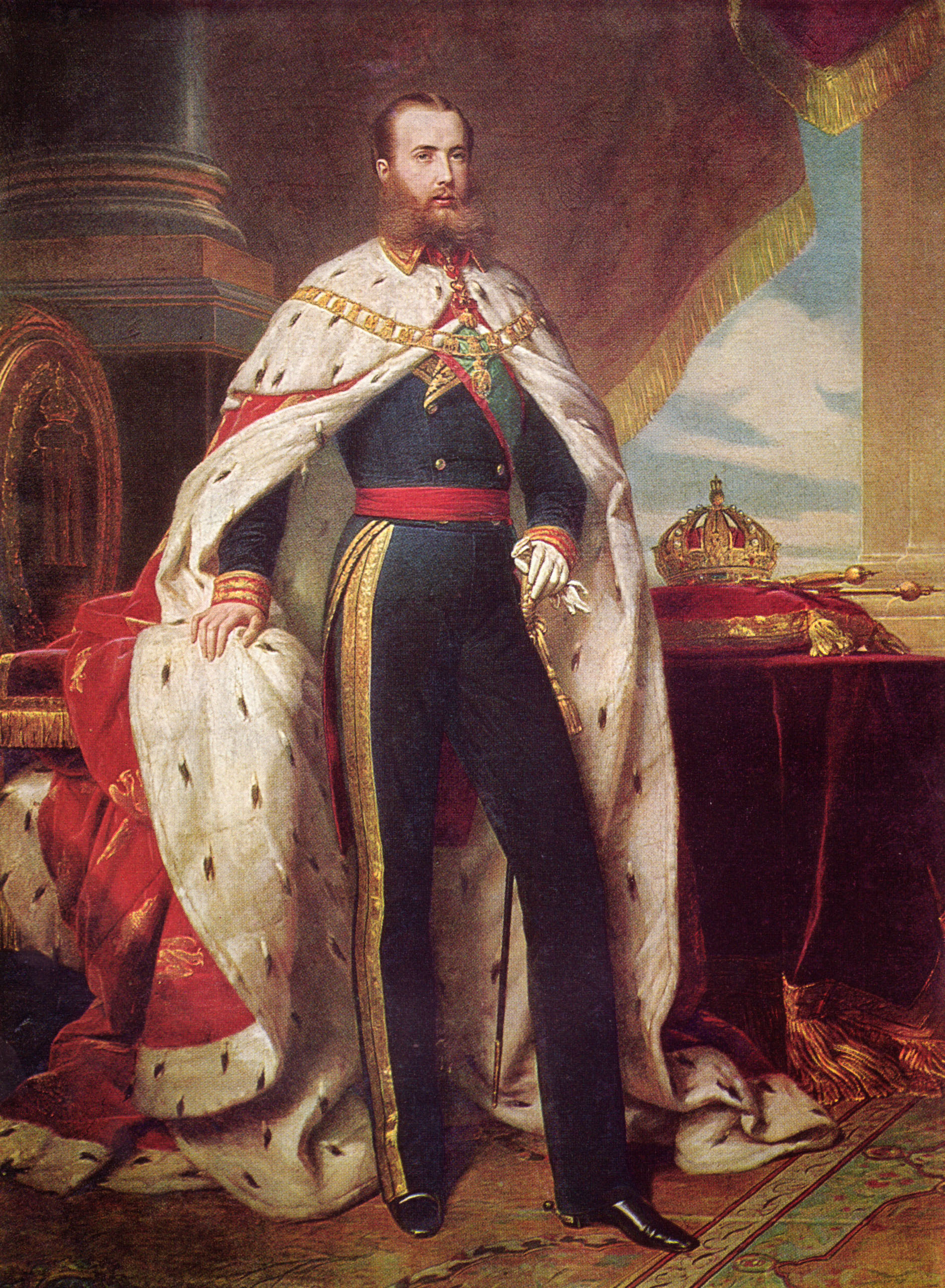
Emperor Maximiliano I

- Emperor Agustin I
- Emperor Maximiliano I

== Politicians ==
- Oscar Eduardo Ramirez Aguilar
- Ignacio Gregorio Comonfort de los Ríos
- Miguel Alemán Valdés
- Miguel Alemán Velasco
- Gilberto Bosques Saldívar
- Luis H. Álvarez
- Eduardo Bours
- Felipe Calderón
- Fidelia Brindis Camacho
- Heberto Castillo
- Manuel J. Clouthier
- Cuauhtémoc
- Cuauhtémoc Cárdenas
- Lázaro Cárdenas Batel
- Lázaro Cárdenas del Río
- Venustiano Carranza
- Luis Donaldo Colosio
- Porfirio Díaz
- Marcelo Ebrard
- Diego Fernández de Cevallos
- Marti Batres
- Vicente Fox
- Rosa Albina Garavito
- José Eleuterio González, Gonzalitos
- Manuel Gómez Morín
- Plutarco Elías Calles
- Elba Esther Gordillo
- Carlos Hank González
- Jorge Hank Rhon
- Enrique Jackson
- Benito Juárez
- Vicente Lombardo Toledano
- Andrés Manuel López Obrador
- José López Portillo
- Francisco I. Madero
- Carlos A. Madrazo
- Roberto Madrazo
- Arnoldo Martínez Verdugo
- Moctezuma Ilhuicamina
- Moctezuma Xocoyotzin
- Antonio Ortiz Mena
- Mauricio Kuri
- Enrique Peña Nieto
- Armando Ríos Piter
- Rosario Robles
- Carlos Salinas de Gortari
- Claudia Sheinbaum
- Jesús Silva-Herzog
- Fidel Velázquez
- Ernesto Zedillo
- Demetrio Sodi

== Religious people ==
- Ernesto Corripio y Ahumada, Cardinal
- Felipe de Jesús, Saint (Martyr)
- Juan Diego Cuauhtlatoatzin, Saint
- Anacleto González Flores, Beato, (Martyr)
- Rafael Guízar Valencia, Bishop, Saint
- Miguel Hidalgo y Costilla
- Javier Lozano Barragán, Cardinal
- Cristóbal Magallanes Jara, Saint
- Miguel Agustín Pro, Beato, (Martyr)
- Norberto Rivera, Cardinal
- José Sánchez del Río, Beato (Martyr)
- Margarito Bautista, theologian and religious founder

== Science and technology ==
=== A–L ===
- José Adem, mathematician
- Miguel Alcubierre, theoretical and computational physicist; see Alcubierre drive
- Celia Mercedes Alpuche Aranda, infectious diseases researcher
- Fernando Altamirano, physician, botanist and naturalist
- Miguel Alvarez del Toro, biologist
- Carlos Arias Ortiz, biochemist
- León Ávalos y Vez, mechanical engineer
- Juan Francisco Azcárate, military, aircraft designer and engineer
- Albert Baez, physicist
- Isidro Baldenegro López, awarded the 2005 Goldman Environmental Prize
- Alicia Bárcena Ibarra, biologist
- Francisco Barnés de Castro, engineer
- Marcos E. Becerra, anthropologist and botanist
- Jacob Bekenstein, physicist; contributed to the foundation of black hole thermodynamics; see the Bekenstein bound
- Becky Bios, activist, biologist, teacher
- Francisco Bolívar Zapata, biochemist and professor
- Alberto Bustani Adem, engineer
- Edwin Bustillos, awarded the Goldman Environmental Prize in 1996
- Juan Ismael Calzada, botanist; credited with the discovery of the elm Ulmus ismaelis
- Carlos Canseco, physician and philanthropist
- Nabor Carrillo Flores, nuclear physicist, scientific advisor and former president of UNAM
- Heberto Castillo, civil engineer and political activist
- Ana María Cetto, physicist
- Ignacio Chapela, microbial ecologist and mycologist; notable for his work with natural resources and indigenous right|uprights
- Ignacio Chávez Sánchez, physician and cardiologist
- Alejandro Corichi, theoretical physics; contributed to the understanding of classical aspects of black holes
- Jorge Cuesta, chemist
- José Antonio de Alzate y Ramírez, scientist
- Miguel de Icaza, free software programmer; started GNOME
- Pablo de la Llave, biologist
- Antonio de León y Gama, astronomer, anthropologist and writer
- Andrés Manuel del Río, chemist; discovered vanadium
- Alfredo Dugès, biologist
- Luis Enrique Erro, astronomer
- Henry Eyring, chemist
- Jefa Fabiana, head of nursing
- Carlos Frenk, astronomer; pioneer in simulations of large-scale structure
- Héctor García-Molina, database researcher
- Ángel María Garibay K, linguist
- Francisco Javier González-Acuña, mathematician
- Guillermo González Camarena, inventor of the first color television system
- Rosario María Gutiérrez Eskildsen, lexicographer, linguist, educator, and poet
- Julio César Gutiérrez Vega, physicist
- Gastón Guzmán, mycologist and anthropologist
- Guadalupe Hayes-Mota, biotechnologist and business director
- Guillermo Haro, astrophysicist and astronomer; co-discoverer of Herbig–Haro objects
- Alfonso L. Herrera, biologist
- José María Lanz, mathematician and engineer
- Yolanda Lastra, linguist
- Antonio Lazcano, biologist
- Jesús León Santos, awarded the 2008 Goldman Environmental Prize
- José Luis Lezama, scientist
- Susana López Charreton, biochemist
- Ana María López Colomé, biochemist
- Rita López de Llergo y Seoane, geographer

=== M–Z ===
- Miguel Ángel J. Márquez Ruiz, veterinarian
- German Martinez Hidalgo, physicist, mathematician, chemist and astronomer
- Daniel Mastretta, engineer and car designer
- Héctor Mayagoitia Domínguez, chemist
- Federico Mena, computer programmer
- Luis E. Miramontes, co-inventor of the contraceptive pill
- Ricardo Miledi, neuroscientist who won the Royal Medal in 1998
- Cristina Mittermeier, photographer and biochemical engineer
- José Mariano Mociño, botanist
- Mario J. Molina, Nobel Prize winner in 1995
- Carmen Mondragón Nahui Olin, model, painter and poet
- General Manuel Mondragón, firearm designer
- Rodolfo Montiel Flores, awarded the Goldman Environmental Prize in 2000
- Rodolfo Neri Vela, astronaut and scientist
- Víctor Neumann-Lara, mathematician
- Melchor Ocampo, biologist, politician
- Esther Orozco, biologist
- Federico Ortiz Quezada, urologist
- Antonio Peña Díaz, biochemist
- Arcadio Poveda, astronomer; developed a method to calculate the mass of elliptical galaxies
- Marco Rito-Palomares, biologist
- Diego Rodríguez, mathematician, astronomer, educator and technological innovator
- Raúl Rojas, computer scientist and mathematician
- Arturo Rosenblueth, physician and physiologist
- Reyes Tamez Guerra, immunochemist
- Ted Taylor, physicist, nuclear-weapons designer
- Fernando Vallejo, biologist, filmmaker and writer
- Evangelina Villegas, biochemist
- Hilda Villegas Castrejón, surgeon and a pioneer in electron microscopy
- Nora Volkow, physician
- Rossana Reguillo, social scientist

== Sports ==
=== American football ===
- Isaac Alarcón, NFL, offensive tackle
- Raúl Allegre, NFL, placekicker
- Frank Corral, NFL, placekicker
- Tom Fears, NFL, wide receiver
- Efrén Herrera, NFL, placekicker
- Victor Leyva, NFL, offensive guard
- Marco Martos, NFL Europe, wide receiver, head coach
- Jose Portilla, NFL, offensive tackle
- Ramiro Pruneda, NFL, offensive tackle
- Aldo Richins, NFL, wingback
- Rafael Septién, NFL, placekicker
- Joaquin Zendejas, NFL, placekicker
- Luis Zendejas, NFL, placekicker
- Marty Zendejas, NFL, placekicker
- Max Zendejas, NFL, placekicker
- Tony Zendejas, NFL, placekicker

=== Baseball ===
- Juan Acevedo, MLB, pitcher
- Alfredo Aceves, MLB, pitcher
- Tavo Álvarez, MLB, pitcher
- Alfredo Amézaga, MLB
- Bobby Ávila, MLB, second baseman
- Luis Ayala, MLB, pitcher
- Manny Bañuelos, MLB, pitcher
- Nelson Barrera, LMB, infielder / designated hitter
- Rigo Beltrán, MLB, pitcher
- Vinny Castilla, MLB, third baseman, manager
- Humberto Cota, MLB, catcher
- Jorge Cantú, MLB, third baseman / first baseman
- Luis Cruz, MLB, shortstop
- Jorge de la Rosa, MLB, pitcher
- Elmer Dessens, MLB, pitcher
- Erubiel Durazo, MLB, first baseman
- Narciso Elvira, MLB, pitcher
- Héctor Espino, LMB & MPL, first baseman, manager
- Francisco Paquín Estrada, LMB, catcher, manager
- Marco Estrada, MLB, pitcher
- Yovani Gallardo, MLB, pitcher
- Jaime Garcia, MLB, pitcher
- Benji Gil, MLB, infielder
- Miguel González, MLB, pitcher
- Victor González, MLB, pitcher
- Teddy Higuera, MLB, pitcher
- Alejandro Kirk, MLB, catcher
- Arnold León, MLB, pitcher
- Esteban Loaiza, MLB, pitcher
- Aurelio López, MLB, relief pitcher
- Jorge Orta, MLB, second baseman / designated hitter / outfielder
- Roberto Osuna, MLB, pitcher
- Ramiro Peña, MLB, infielder
- Óliver Pérez, MLB, pitcher
- Dennys Reyes, MLB, pitcher
- Óscar Robles, MLB, infielder
- Aurelio Rodríguez, MLB, third baseman
- Fernando Salas, MLB, pitcher
- Ali Solis, MLB, catcher
- Joakim Soria, MLB, relief pitcher
- Julio Urías, MLB, pitcher
- José Urquidy, MLB, pitcher
- Fernando Valenzuela, MLB, pitcher
- Christian Villanueva, MLB, third baseman

=== Basketball ===
- Gustavo Ayón, NBA, center
- Romel Beck, NBA Development League, point guard
- Jorge Gutiérrez, NBA, point guard
- Horacio Llamas, NBA, center
- Eduardo Nájera, NBA, forward

=== Mixed martial arts ===
- Jessica Aguilar
- Irene Aldana
- Akbarh Arreola
- Gabriel Moggly Benítez
- Marco Psycho Beltrán
- Henry Bure Briones
- Édgar Cháirez
- Efraín Escudero
- Lupita Loopy Godinez
- Alexa Grasso
- Brandon Moreno
- Alejandro Pérez
- Erik Goyito Pérez
- José Alberto Teco Quiñónez
- Polo Reyes
- Irwin Rivera
- Ronaldo Lazy Boy Rodríguez
- Yair Pantera Rodríguez
- Hector Sandoval
- Manuel El Loco Torres
- Francisco Treviño
- Héctor El Toro Urbina
- Kazula Vargas
- Daniel Zellhuber

=== Tennis ===
- Enrique Abaroa
- Bruno Echagaray
- Daniel Garza
- Lucas Gómez
- Santiago González
- Hans Hach Verdugo
- Tigre Hank
- Luis Herrera
- Leonardo Lavalle
- Mario Llamas
- Jorge Lozano
- Francisco Maciel
- Juan Manuel Elizondo
- Agustín Moreno
- Óscar Ortiz
- Rafael Osuna
- Antonio Palafox
- Luis Patiño
- Raúl Ramírez
- Yola Ramírez
- Miguel Ángel Reyes-Varela
- Manuel Sánchez
- Renata Zarazúa

=== Boxing ===
- Saúl Canelo Álvarez
- Romeo Anaya
- Alfredo El Perro Angulo
- Jorge Travieso Arce
- Jose Tecuala Argumedo
- Ricardo Arredondo
- Antonio Avelar
- Gilberto Keb Baby Luis V Baas
- Marco Antonio Baby-Faced Assassin Barrera
- César El Paso Bazán
- José Becerra
- Ray Sugar Beltrán
- Miguel El Alacrán Berchelt
- Víctor El Acorazado Burgos
- Luis Ramón Yori Boy Campas
- Miguel Canto
- Cruz Chucho Carbajal
- Chango Carmona
- Jesús Chucho Castillo
- Freddy Castillo
- José Luis Castillo
- Martín El Gallo Castillo
- Hugo El Increíble Cázares
- Julio Pollito Ceja
- Julio César El Gran Campeón Mexicano Chávez
- Julio César El hijo de la leyenda Chávez Jr
- Jesús El Tigre Chong
- Julio Cesar El Rey Martinez
- Julio César Pingo Miranda
- Cristóbal Lacandón Cruz
- Carlos Cuadras
- Pipino Cuevas
- Ricardo Delgado, Olympic boxing
- Juan de la Rosa
- Antonio DeMarco
- Gamaliel El Plátano Díaz
- Julio The Kidd Díaz
- Guty Puro Yucatán Espadas
- Juan José Dinamita Estrada
- Juan Francisco El Gallo Estrada
- Moisés Moy Fuentes
- Alejandro Terra García
- Isidro El Chino García
- Raúl Rayito García
- Néstor El Tigre Garza
- Alfonso Gómez
- Miguel Ángel González
- Jhonny González
- Humberto González
- Rodolfo González
- Rodrigo Gatito Guerrero
- Pedro Guevara
- Adrián El Confesor Hernández
- Juan Churritos Hernández
- Rafael Herrera
- Ramón García Hirales
- Óscar "El Chololo" Larios
- Carlos Mexicanito Licona
- Rafael Bazooka Limón
- Ganigan El Maravilla López
- Ricardo Finito López
- Rodolfo Rudy López
- Raúl Macías
- Lupe Madera
- Hernán Márquez
- Juan Manuel Dinamita Márquez
- Rafael Márquez
- Abner Mares
- Rodolfo Martínez
- Manuel "Mantecas" Medina
- Javier Cobra Mendoza
- Juan Meza
- Cristian El Diamante Mijares
- Carlos King Molina
- Fernando Cochulito Montiel
- Diego Pelucho Morales
- Erik Terrible Morales
- Jaime Munguía
- Rubén Púas Olivares
- Jorge Maromero Páez
- Jackie Princesa Azteca Nava
- Emanuel El Vaquero Navarrete
- Luis Pantera Nery
- Oswaldo El Gallito Novoa
- Carlos Palomino
- Raúl Pérez
- Lupe Pintor
- Daniel Ponce de León
- José El Gallito Quirino
- Gilberto Zurdo de Oro Ramírez
- José Luis Ramírez
- Luis Ramón "Yori Boy" Campas Medina
- Joaquín Rocha
- Francisco Rodríguez Jr.
- Mario Dragoncito Rodriguez
- Tomás Gusano Rojas
- Antonio Roldán
- Gilberto Román
- Omar Giant Killer Romero
- Hugo Cuatito Ruiz
- Lauro Salas
- Vicente Saldivar
- Juan Matador Salgado
- Orlando Siri Salido
- Clemente Xicotencatl Sánchez
- Rubén Yiyo Sánchez
- Salvador Sal Sánchez
- Léo El Terremoto Santa Cruz
- Giovani El Guerrero Azteca Segura
- Laura Serrano
- Ulises Solís
- Édgar Sosa
- Elwin La Pulga Soto
- Humberto La Zorrita Soto
- Victor Vikingo Terrazas
- Efren Torres
- Ana María Torres
- Óscar Valdez
- Francisco El Bandido Vargas
- Rey Vargas
- Israel Magnifico Vázquez
- Miguel El Títere Vázquez
- Luis Kid Azteca Villanueva
- Alfredo Xeque
- Alfonso Zamora
- Daniel Zaragoza
- Carlos Zárate Serna
- Juan Zurita

=== Bullfighters ===
- Alejandro Amaya
- Carlos Arruza
- Jaime Bravo
- Guillermo Capetillo
- Eloy Cavazos
- Michelito Lagravere
- Rafita Mirabal
- Manuel Martínez Ancira
- Silverio Pérez
- Carmelo Torres

=== Football ===
==== A–M ====
- Javier Vasco Aguirre, attacking midfielder, retired, head coach
- Edson Álvarez, defender
- Néstor Araujo, defender
- Gerardo Arteaga, defender
- Luís Roberto Alves Zague, winger, retired
- Jesús Cabrito Arellano, midfielder, retired
- Pablo Barrera, winger
- Juan Ignacio Basaguren, attacking midfielder, retired
- Adolfo Bofo Bautista, attacking midfielder
- Christian Hobbit Bermúdez, attacking midfielder
- Cuauhtémoc Blanco, attacking midfielder, retired
- Jared Borgetti, striker, retired
- Enrique Borja, striker, retired
- Omar Bravo, striker
- Jorge Campos, goalkeeper, striker, retired
- Antonio La Tota Carbajal, goalkeeper, retired, head coach
- Nery Castillo, attacking midfielder, Forward
- Jesús Manuel Corona, midfielder
- Leonardo Cuéllar, midfielder, retired, Mexico women's national coach
- Antonio Tano de Nigris, striker, retired
- José Manuel Chepo de la Torre, midfielder, retired, head coach
- Maribel Domínguez, Marigol, striker, women's football
- Giovani dos Santos, attacking midfielder
- Jonathan dos Santos, midfielder
- Marco Fabián, midfielder
- Carlos Fierro, striker
- Fernando Julien Freire (born 1986) striker, retired
- Luis Pirata Fuente, midfielder, retired
- Benjamín Galindo, attacking midfielder, retired, head coach
- Alberto García Aspe, attacking midfielder, retired
- Luis García, striker, retired
- Jesús Gómez, defender
- Julio Gómez, winger
- Monica González, defender, retired, sportscaster
- Omar Govea, midfielder
- Andrés Guardado, midfielder
- Raúl Gudiño, goalkeeper
- Erick Gutiérrez, midfielder
- Raúl Gutiérrez, defender, retired, head coach
- Víctor Guzmán, defender
- Víctor Pocho Guzmán, midfielder
- Javier Hernández, striker
- Luis Hernández, Matador, striker, retired
- Héctor Herrera, midfielder
- Miguel Herrera, defender, retired, head coach
- Sofia Huerta, forward
- Efraín Juárez, defender
- Raúl Jiménez, forward
- Diego Lainez, midfielder
- Manuel Lapuente, forward, retired, head coach
- Miguel Layún, defender
- Jonathan Levin, footballer
- Fatima Leyva, midfielder, women's football
- Hirving Lozano, forward
- Braulio Luna, forward
- Jonny Magallón, defender
- Joao Maleck, forward
- Rafael Márquez, defender, defensive midfielder
- Stephany Mayor, forward
- Alberto Venado Medina, forward
- Paolo Medina, defender
- Ramón Morales, midfielder, retired
- Héctor Moreno, defender

==== N–Z ====
- Antônio Naelson, Sinha, midfielder
- Gustavo Gusano Nápoles, attacking midfielder, retired
- Manuel Negrete, attacking midfielder, retired
- Teresa Noyola, midfielder
- Mónica Ocampo, forward
- Jonathan Orozco, goalkeeper
- Guillermo Memo Ochoa, goalkeeper
- Christopher Roberto Ortega, midfielder
- Norma Palafox, forward
- Francisco Palencia, forward
- Pável Pardo, midfielder
- Éder Patiño, goalkeeper
- Luis Ernesto Perez, forward
- Verónica Pérez, midfielder
- Gonzalo Pineda, defender
- Rodolfo Pizarro, midfielder
- Eugenio Pizzuto, midfielder
- Alan Pulido, forward
- Ramón Ramírez, midfielder, defender, retired
- Salvador Chava Reyes, striker, retired
- Ángel Reyna, attacking midfielder
- Adolfo Ríos, goalkeeper
- Daniel Ríos, striker
- Alberto Rodríguez, defender
- Arianna Romero, defender
- Jennifer Ruiz, defender
- Francisco Javier Maza Rodríguez, defender
- Carlos Salcedo, defender
- Carlos Salcido, defender
- Raúl Alberto Salinas, defender
- Hugo Sánchez, striker, retired, head coach
- Oswaldo Sánchez, goalkeeper
- Ángel Sosa, striker, retired
- Jesús Aarón Soto, goalkeeper, retired
- Claudio Suárez, defender, retired
- Gerardo Borrego Torrado, defensive midfielder
- Víctor Ulloa, midfielder
- Carlos Vela, striker
- Cesáreo Victorino, attacking midfielder
- Ignacio Trelles, don Nacho, head coach

=== Motorsports ===
- Carlos Contreras, NASCAR
- Luis Díaz, CART, American Le Mans Series
- Mario Domínguez, CART
- Adrián Fernández, CART, American Le Mans Series
- Josele Garza, CART
- Jorge Goeters, NASCAR
- Ricardo González, CART, FIA WEC
- Benito Guerra, rallying
- Carlos Guerrero, CART
- Esteban Gutiérrez, Formula One
- Israel Jaitovich, NASCAR, road racer
- Michel Jourdain Jr., CART, NASCAR and rallying
- Sergio Checo Pérez, Formula One
- Jo Ramírez, team coordinator Formula One
- José Luis Ramírez, NASCAR
- Héctor Alonso Rebaque, Formula One, CART
- Pedro Rodríguez, Formula One
- Ricardo Rodríguez, Formula One
- Memo Rojas, Rolex Sports Car Series
- Moisés Solana, Formula One
- Daniel Suárez, NASCAR
- Patricio Pato O'Ward, IndyCar Series
- Ricardo Triviño, rallying

=== Olympic and Paralympian athletes ===
- Raúl Alcalá, bicycle road racing
- Daniel Bautista, racewalking
- Perla Bustamante, Paralympian, track and field
- Ernesto Canto, racewalking
- Joaquín Capilla, diving
- Alejandro Cárdenas, track and field
- Everardo Cristóbal Quirino, canoe racing
- Nancy Contreras, track cycling
- Paola Espinosa, diving
- María del Rosario Espinoza, taekwondo
- Víctor Estrada, taekwondo
- Adriana Fernández, marathon runner
- Álvaro Gaxiola, diving
- Carlos Girón, diving
- Rodolfo Gómez, marathon runner
- Raúl González, racewalking
- Belem Guerrero, track cycling
- Ana Gabriela Guevara, track and field
- Salvador Hernández, Paralympian, track and field
- Soraya Jiménez, weightlifter
- Brenda Magaña, gymnast
- Saúl Mendoza, Paralympian, wheelchair racer
- Humberto Mariles, equestrian
- Carlos Mercenario, racewalking
- Felipe Tibio Muñoz, swimming
- Rommel Pacheco, diving
- José Sargento Pedraza, racewalker
- Guillermo Pérez Sandoval, taekwondo
- Fernando Platas, diving
- Maria Teresa Ramírez, swimming
- Romary Rifka, high jump
- Pilar Roldán, fencing
- Iridia Salazar, taekwondo
- Oscar Salazar, taekwondo
- Mario Santillán, Paralympian, marathon
- Juan René Serrano, archery
- Roberto Strauss, Olympic swimmer
- Rubén Uriza, equestrian
- Alberto Valdés, equestrian
- Jeny Velazco, Paralympian, track and field
- Hubertus von Hohenlohe, alpine skier
- José Manuel Youshimatz, track cycling
- Vanessa Zambotti, judo
- Luis Alberto Zepeda Félix, Paralympian, track and field

=== Wrestling ===
- Essa Rios
- Alfonso Dantés, El Tanque
- Apolo Dantés
- Américo Rocca
- Atlantis
- Black Shadow
- Blue Demon
- Blue Panther
- Brazo de Plata / Super Porky
- Cavernario Galindo
- Cien Caras
- Charly Manson
- Alberto Del Rio / Dos Caras Jr.
- Dos Caras
- Dr. Wagner Jr.
- El Brazo
- El Canek
- El Dandy
- El Hijo del Santo
- El Santo
- Emilio Charles Jr.
- Enrique Llanes
- Faby Apache
- Heavy Metal
- Héctor Garza
- Ayako Hamada
- Jerry Estrada
- L. A. Park
- La Parka
- Lady Apache
- Latin Lover
- Lizmark
- Lizmark Jr.
- Mari Apache
- Máscara Año 2000
- Máscara Sagrada
- Mascarita Sagrada
- Mil Máscaras
- Miss Janeth
- Místico / Sin Cara
- Negro Casas
- Octagón
- Octagoncito
- Perro Aguayo
- Perro Aguayo Jr.
- Pierroth Jr.
- Pirata Morgan
- Rayo de Jalisco Jr.
- Rayo de Jalisco Sr.
- Ringo Mendoza
- Carmelo Reyes, Cien Caras
- Rito Romero
- Satánico
- Sexy Star
- Shocker
- Scorpio Jr.
- Tarzán López
- Villano III
- Volador Jr.
- Zuleyma

=== Golf ===
- Ernesto Acosta
- Rafael Alarcón
- Rodolfo Cazaubón
- Roberto Díaz
- María Fassi
- Óscar Fraustro
- Alejandra Llaneza
- Gaby López
- Lorena Ochoa
- Carlos Ortiz
- Victor Regalado
- Violeta Retamoza
- José de Jesús Rodríguez
- Cesar Sanudo
- Esteban Toledo
- Sebastián Vázquez

=== Other sports ===
- Álvaro Beltrán, racquetball
- Carlos Carsolio, mountaineering
- Jesús Castañón, horse racing
- Victor Espinoza, horse racing
- Jose L. Espinoza, horse racing
- David R. Flores, horse racing
- Martin García, horse racing
- Carlos Gracida, polo
- Memo Gracida, polo
- Mario Gutierrez, horse racing
- Alberto Harari, horse racing
- Paola Longoria, racquetball
- Paco Lopez, horse racing
- Roberto Mangas, mountaineering
- Sergio Pérez, Formula 1
- Álvaro Pineda, horse racing
- Roberto Pineda, horse racing
- Eusebio Razo Jr., horse racing
- Carlos Torre Repetto, chess
- Samantha Salas, racquetball
- Marcel Sisniega Campbell, chess

== See also ==
- List of Mexican Americans
- List of Mexican British people
