= Capitalist propaganda =

Promotion of capitalist ideology

Capitalist propaganda is the promotion of capitalism, often via mass media, education, or other institutions, primarily by the ruling private and political elite. According to critics of capitalism, capitalist propaganda is commonly deployed in capitalist countries to maintain the cultural hegemony of capitalism, by positioning it as the supreme and only valid system, eliminating opposing and dissenting views, and portraying non-capitalist perspectives and countries as comparatively incompetent and inferior, thus reinforcing capitalism as the dominant ideology. Various techniques are employed to employ capitalist propaganda, including idealization of social mobility under capitalism and portraying non-capitalist ideologies negatively. Capitalist propaganda is spread through various means, including mass media, entertainment, television, museums, and the art establishment.

== Description ==
Capitalist propaganda is the promotion of capitalism, often via mass media, education, or other institutions, primarily by the ruling private and political elite.

== Purposes ==
Michael J. Vavrus uses the term to describe a nearly 150-year-long campaign to "demonize political economy alternatives to the dominance of corporate capitalism." According to critics of capitalism, capitalist propaganda is commonly deployed in capitalist countries to maintain the cultural hegemony of capitalism, by positioning it as the supreme and only valid system, eliminating opposing and dissenting views, and portraying non-capitalist perspectives and countries as comparatively incompetent and inferior, thus reinforcing capitalism as the dominant ideology.

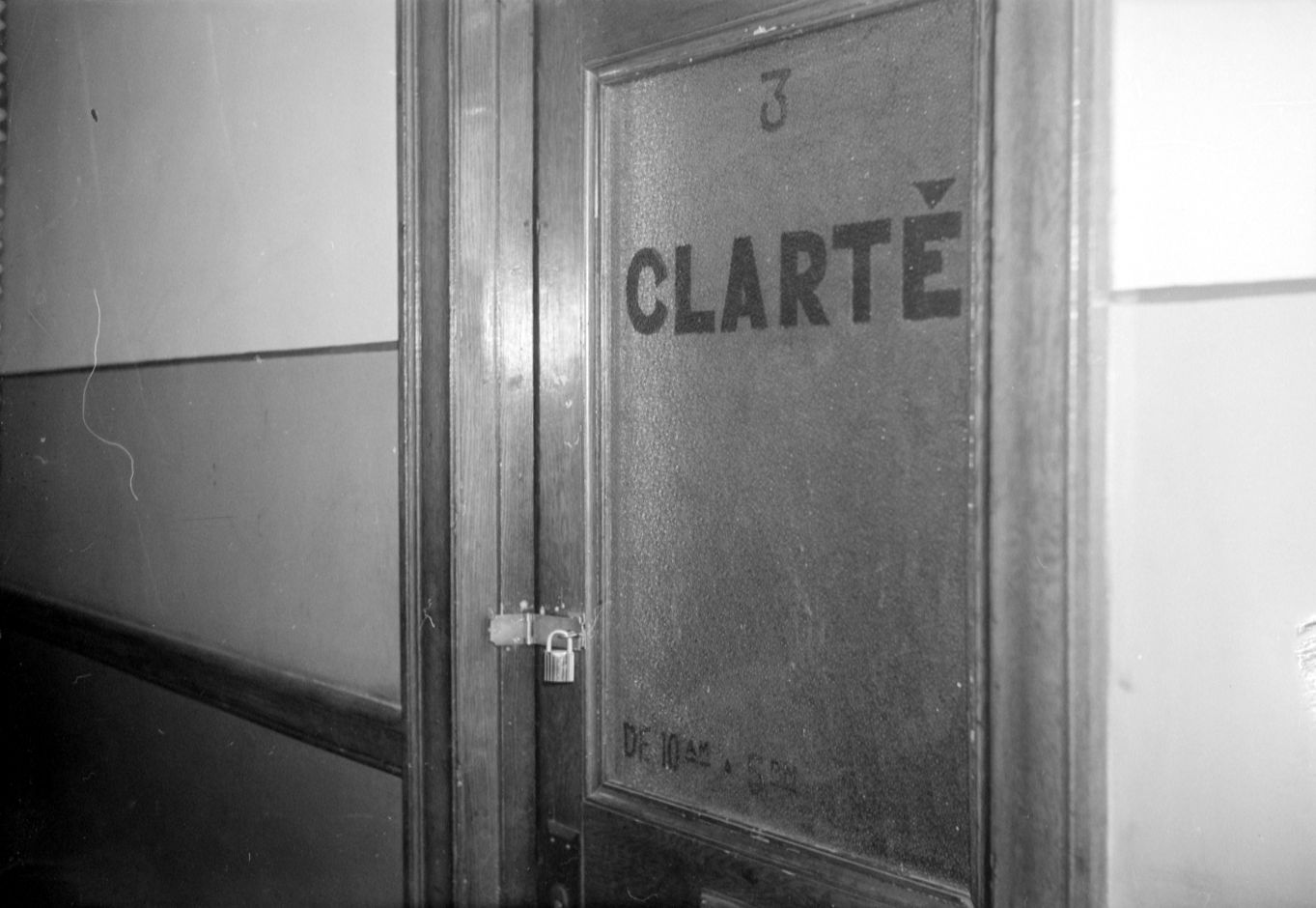
The doorway of the newspaper La Clarté, a weekly communist newspaper, padlocked by the police in Montreal, Quebec, Canada in 1937

=== Ideological hegemony ===
A purpose of capitalist propaganda is to maintain ideological hegemony, or the capacity for any ruling class to have their interests be reflected "as the common interest of all members of society, put in an ideal form," so that their interests are universalized as the only valid ones. Philosopher Antonio Gramsci argued that "it is necessary to establish ideological hegemony in order to maintain the continuity of capitalism" and that this is the role of capitalist propaganda. The ruling political and private elite, who control institutions like education and the mass media, exclude and eliminate opposing views, which allows for capitalist propaganda to operate on an almost invisible level in capitalist countries while being enforced at all levels, often going completely unnoticed and unchecked.

In media throughout capitalist countries, such as the United States, "socialist views are excluded from American public discourse," and capitalism is portrayed as an economic system that is simply "equated by definition with political democracy, freedom, and patriotism," writes media studies scholar Donald Lazare. Capitalist propaganda is "reinforced by the mantra that there is no alternative, [which] ensures that any questions concerning (alternative) economic realities are considered as secondary, incidental, indulgent, and ultimately redundant." As scholar Jason Lee describes, "the propaganda of capitalism has worked so well that most people, of the left and the right, find it inconceivable that any other system should exist, and this is the aim of the ideology."

Capitalist propaganda has been determined to be carried out by the private and political elite with the purpose of maintaining their own wealth and power in society. As Guinevere Liberty Nell writes in her analysis of capitalist propaganda and the public discourse, "in a private property economy, the powerful elite are in the private sector; and when it is the private sector that sustains the powerful, it is in their own interest to promote the private property system." Nell describes that capitalist propaganda is "used to support the ideals and norms that are required for, or at least to help bolster, the private property system and the elite's place in it" and that even those who do not intend to engage in the spread of capitalist propaganda may do so because of their conditioning in modern capitalist society.

== Techniques ==
=== Idealization of social mobility under capitalism ===
Capitalist propaganda has been identified as promoting individualism through idealizing the conditions of social mobility under the liberal free market or laissez-faire capitalism. Phrases such as "pulling oneself up by the bootstraps" and having the "frontier mentality" promote the idea that going from "rags to riches" through rugged individualism is available to all who work hard enough, or what has otherwise been referred to as the myth of meritocracy. For example, Businessman and television personality Kevin O'Leary described the abject poverty of over 3.5 billion people being equal to the wealth of 85 of the richest people as "fantastic news" since it was "motivation" to become one of "the 1%."

=== Portraying non-capitalist ideologies negatively ===
Capitalist propaganda commonly adopts the technique of portraying non-capitalist ideologies negatively. Scholars have identified that capitalist propaganda in Western countries most commonly takes the form of anti-communist or anti-socialist propaganda. Political journalist Anthony Westell identifies a "relentless [campaign of] anti-socialist propaganda by capitalists who feared for their own wealth and power and, conveniently, controlled most of the mass media" in capitalist countries.

=== Portraying non-capitalist countries negatively ===
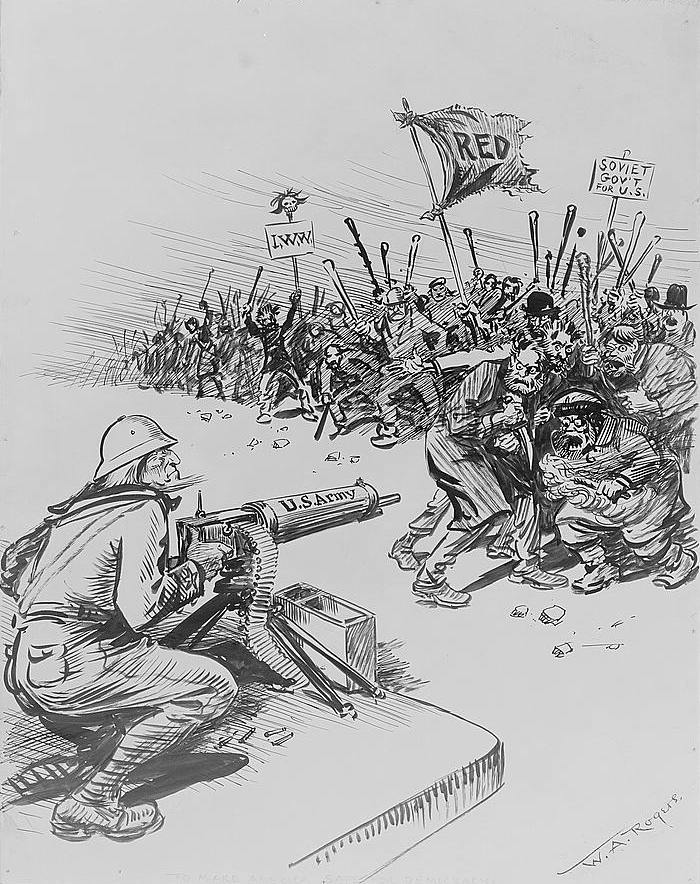
Anti-communist poster (1919) by William Allen Rogers in the New York Herald, depicting a U.S. Army soldier pointing a machine gun at a crowd of "reds" and "wobblies" holding signs in support of communism and a "Soviet Gov't for U.S."

==== On the Soviet Union ====
Following the October Revolution in the Soviet Union, capitalist propaganda was used throughout the United States, Canada, the United Kingdom, and other countries to portray the country and leaders of the revolution negatively to the people. Scholars have identified that this was done largely out of fear that the revolution would inspire similar uprisings in their own countries.

In Canada, the general secretary of the Communist Party of Canada, Tim Buck, claimed that the Canadian elite used capitalist propaganda in the wake of the October Revolution to portray the Soviet Union negatively to the Canadian people. Buck wrote that "the capitalist press distorted the meaning of the nationalization of banks and industries and referred to those great democratic reforms as 'the work of criminals.'" Buck describes how Lenin was also portrayed by the Canadian elite as an agent of the German Empire: "capitalist propaganda was directed very largely at confusing and intimidating people by the lying pretense that Lenin was 'a German agent' whose purpose was to deliver Russia into the hands of the German imperialists.".

=== Promotion of capitalism as superior ===
Supreme Court justice Lewis F. Powell Jr. argued "for free enterprise education in television, radio, and other media" in order to "sell" the idea of laissez-faire capitalism to the masses. As described by scholar Lawrence B. Glickman, "selling [free market capitalism] meant telling (highlighting the virtues of free enterprise), but it also meant yelling (condemning those out to undermine it). Indeed, the two could not be separated since critics always seemed to be gaining ground."

In the United Kingdom, high unemployment in the wake of the October Revolution concerned the British elite, who were anxious to avoid a repeat of the Russian Revolution in their own country and a turn to communism. Material was sent to the Economic League, a non-governmental organization dedicated to the surveillance of anti-capitalist activity, stating that "what is required is some years of propaganda for capitalism as the finest system that human ingenuity can devise." The League responded by placing numerous articles in newspapers, paying journalists to write them, and funding speakers, who they referred to as "big men in every sense of the word," to talk to the British public about economics in simplistic terms.

=== Promotion of capitalism as the only viable option ===
Scholars Richard J. White and Colin C. Williams state, "at a time of global neoliberal economic, environmental and political crisis, capitalism is presented as society's least worst option" through propaganda. Professor Stephen Duncombe writes "the powers that be do not sustain their legitimacy by convincing people that the current system is The Answer. That fiction would be too difficult to sustain in the face of so much evidence to the contrary. What they must do, and what they have always done very effectively, is convince the mass of people that there is no alternative." Late philosopher Mark Fisher referred to this phenomenon as "capitalist realism", where he demonstrated how capitalism was thought to be the only viable economic system to the point where imagining another system is prevented.

Another reason for this conception is due to the pervasiveness of capitalism, lack of present alternatives, and skepticism of alternatives' feasibility. Pro-capitalist individuals will often comment that capitalism equates to "human nature" and is hence unavoidable, despite the existences of Revolutionary Catalonia, Makhnovshchina, and the Paris Commune proving otherwise. Furthermore, the United States' role in the antidemocratic toppling of left-wing foreign governments have also helped to legitimize the capitalist realist perception.

In sociology, the dominance of capitalist thought stems from Antonio Gramsci's theory of cultural hegemony, in which "consent to the rule of the dominant group is achieved by the spread of ideologies—beliefs, assumptions, and values—through social institutions such as schools, churches, courts, and the media, among others." Consequentially, institutions serve to create an echo chamber of their ideological roots. In this case, capitalism conditions society to interact with it on a daily basis (e.g., consumerism, artificial demand, etc.) and provides owners of capital to reinforce their legitimacy. Gramsci's theory has been studied by official sociologists extensively, further confirming this concept.

== Means ==
=== Mass media and entertainment ===
The mass media has been commonly described as the most pervasive avenue of distribution for capitalist propaganda. Advertising has been referred to by cultural theorist Raymond Williams as "the official art of modern capitalist society: it is what 'we' put up in 'our' streets and use to fill up to half of 'our' newspapers and magazines: and it commands the services of perhaps the largest organized body of writers and artists, with their attendant managers and supervisors, in the whole society."

Writers such as Ariel Dorfman and Armand Mattelart in How to Read Donald Duck and Michael Real in Mass-Mediated Culture demonstrate the pervasiveness of capitalist propaganda in mass media such as Disney comics and entertainment venues like Disneyland. Media studies scholars have analyzed how capitalist propaganda in the media and entertainment sectors often goes completely unidentified. Donald Lazare questions, while a fictional "communist version of Disneyland" or an "American socialist television newscast might cause readers to snicker at what they perceive to be blatant propaganda" for socialism, "is it not an indication of how indoctrinated we have been that we do not recognize the real Disneyland or commercialized newscasts as equally blatant propaganda for capitalism?"

=== Television ===
Television has been identified as a major source of capitalist propaganda among existing scholarship and studies. As scholar Guinevere Liberty Nell writes, "the private propaganda of capitalist firms can be seen in many forms of media, including television." Shows such as The Price is Right and Undercover Boss have been identified as programs which visibly perpetuate a capitalist worldview. On the latter, Nell writes that "the show at first might appear to be a positive force upon corporate culture, bringing workers' needs to the attention of the management; actually, it promotes a submissive attitude of workers to management, and focuses on the productivity (and pride) of the workers in much the same way as the Soviet propaganda promoting 'Stakhanovites.'"

Institutions such as the Advertising Council of the United States have been identified as "a propaganda agency for corporate capitalism" because of its work in implicitly upholding capitalism despite claiming to be "non-commercial, non-denominational, non-partisan politically, and not designed to influence legislation." It has been estimated that American children receive over 350,000 propaganda messages for capitalism in television commercials alone by the time they are eighteen.

=== Museums and the art establishment ===
Although they appear as "neutral" institutions in capitalist countries, art museums and other museums have been designed to uphold the ideological beliefs of the elite or capitalist class. Museum studies scholar Nicolas Lampert analyzes how museums in capitalist countries form, what he terms, a Museum-Industrial complex. Organizations such as the Guerilla Art Action Group (GAAG) have protested museums such as the Museum of Modern Art (MOMA), where they removed Kazimir Malevich's Supremacist Composition: White on White from the wall, with no intention to harm the work but rather selecting it as a "symbolic site to present [a] manifesto." The manifesto demanded that MOMA "decentralize its power structure" and stated that if art is "to have any relevance at all today, [it] must be taken out of the hands of an elite and returned to the people." The manifesto further described how the art establishment (1) represses and manipulates artists to primarily create and say only what is "for the benefit of an elite," (2) encourages people to accept or distracts them from their repression by the military/business complex, and (3) functions "as propaganda for capitalism and imperialism all over the world."

=== National organizations ===
National organizations that promote capitalist propaganda and monitor anti-capitalist activity by suppressing people who oppose capitalism exist to maintain the ideological hegemony of capitalism in capitalist countries. These organizations are often explicitly founded by and/or receive heavy financial backing and support from the elite, who use them to spread capitalist propaganda and discourage dissent. The Economic League was a non-governmental organization (NGO) in the United Kingdom dedicated to surveying and opposing all anti-capitalist activity as well as funding capitalist propaganda. The organization kept a blacklist of anti-capitalists for decades which it passed on to corporate members who used it to vet job applicants and deny people jobs based on their anti-capitalist ideological perspectives.

== See also ==
- Corporate propaganda
- Communist propaganda
- Greenwashing
- Redwashing
