= Dorfman =

Dorfman is a surname. Notable people with the surname include:

- Allen Dorfman (1923–1983), American insurance agency owner and criminal
- Ariel Dorfman (born 1942), Chilean-American writer
- Barnaby Dorfman, American entrepreneur and business executive
- Boris Dorfman (1923–2022), Ukrainian-Jewish writer, scholar of Jewish culture, and social activist
- Charles Dorfman, British film producer, director and screenwriter
- Dan Dorfman (1931–2012), American financial journalist, newspaper columnist and TV commentator
- David Dorfman (born 1993), American actor and attorney
- David Dorfman (choreographer) (born 1955), American dancer, choreographer, musician, activist and teacher
- David S. Dorfman, American screenwriter
- Donald Dorfman (1933–2001), American psychologist and radiologist
- Elena Dorfman (born 1965), American fine art photographer
- Elsa Dorfman (1937–2020), American portrait photographer
- Grant Dorfman, American judge
- Harvey Dorfman (1935–2011), American mental skills coach
- Iakov Dorfman (1898–1974), Soviet physicist
- Irvin Dorfman (1924–2006), American amateur tennis player
- Irwin Dorfman (1908–1993), Canadian lawyer
- Joaquin Dorfman (born 1979), American writer
- Josif Dorfman (born 1952), Ukrainian-French chess Grandmaster and chess writer
- Kyle Dorfman (born 1993), American bubkes filmmaker and photographer
- Lloyd Dorfman (born 1952), British entrepreneur
- Michael Dorfman (born 1954), Russian-Israeli author, journalist and activist
- Michel Dorfman (1913–2006), Ukrainian-born rabbi
- Paul Dorfman, American mobster and trade unionist
- Ralph Dorfman (1911–1985), Jewish-American biochemist
- Rodrigo Dorfman (born 1967), American photographer, writer, video artist and journalist
- Stanley Dorfman (born 1927), British television producer and music video director, co-creator of Top of the Pops
- Tommy Dorfman (born 1992), American actress
- Xavier Dorfman (born 1973), French rower

== See also ==
- Dorfmann
