= Critical reading =

Form of language analysis

Critical reading is a form of language analysis that does not take the given text at face value, but involves a deeper examination of the claims put forth as well as the supporting points and possible counterarguments. The ability to reinterpret and reconstruct for improved clarity and readability is also a component of critical reading. The identification of possible ambiguities and flaws in the author's reasoning, in addition to the ability to address them comprehensively, are essential to this process. Critical reading, much like academic writing, requires the linkage of evidential points to corresponding arguments.

As acknowledged by a number of scholars and wordsmiths,

"...a story has as many versions as it has readers. Everyone takes what he wants or can from it and thus changes it to his measure. Some pick out parts and reject the rest, some strain the story through their mesh of prejudice, some paint it with their own delight."
— John Steinbeck, The Winter of Our Discontent (1961)

There are no simple relations between these levels. As the "hermeneutic circle" demonstrates, the understanding of single words depends on the understanding of the text as a whole (as well as the culture in which the text is produced) and vice versa: You cannot understand a text if you do not understand the words in the text.

The critical reading of a given text thus implies a critical examination of the concepts used as well as of the soundness of the arguments and the value and relevance of the assumptions and the traditions on which the text is given.

"Reading between the lines" is the ability to uncover implicit messages and bias.

== Symptomatic reading ==
Thurston (1993, p. 638) introduces the concept of "symptomatic reading": "Symptomatic reading is used in literary criticism as a means of analyzing the presence of ideology in literary texts. French Marxist philosophers Louis Althusser and Étienne Balibar develop the technique of symptomatic reading in Reading Capital". Dorfman and Mattelart later used symptomatic reading as a means of analyzing the presence of imperialist ideology in Disney comics.

== The reciprocal nature of reading and writing ==
When you read, you have to seek information, and you are confronted with different views, which forces you to consider your own position. In this process, the reader is converted to a "writer", whether or not he writes or publishes his own ideas.

Reading and writing are thus reciprocal processes, reading is an active process, and the best way to learn critical reading is probably by training academic writing.

Charles Bazerman (1994) writes about the active role of the reader, and remarks (p. 23): "The cure for real boredom is to find a more advanced book on the subject; the only cure for pseudo-boredom is to become fully and personally involved in the book already in front of you". Bazerman's book is informed by an advanced theoretical knowledge of scholarly research, documents and their composition. For example, chapter 6 is about "Recognizing the many voices in a text". The practical advises given are based on textual theory (Mikhail Bakhtin and Julia Kristeva). Chapter 8 is titled "Evaluating the book as a whole: The book review", and the first heading is "books as tools".

== Epistemological issues ==
Basically critical reading is related to epistemological issues. Hermeneutics (e.g., the version developed by Hans-Georg Gadamer) has demonstrated that the way we read and interpret texts is dependent on our "pre-understanding" and "prejudices". Human knowledge is always an interpretative clarification of the world, not a pure, interest-free theory. Hermeneutics may thus be understood as a theory about critical reading. This field was until recently associated with the humanities, not with science. This situation changed when Thomas Samuel Kuhn published his book (1962) The Structure of Scientific Revolutions, which can be seen as an hermeneutic interpretation of the sciences because it conceives the scientists as governed by assumptions which are historically embedded and linguistically mediated activities organized around paradigms that direct the conceptualization and investigation of their studies. Scientific revolutions imply that one paradigm replaces another and introduces a new set of theories, approaches and definitions. According to Mallery; Hurwitz & Duffy (1992) the notion of a paradigm-centered scientific community is analogous to Gadamer's notion of a linguistically encoded social tradition. In this way hermeneutics challenge the positivist view that science can cumulate objective facts. Observations are always made on the background of theoretical assumptions: they are theory dependent.

By conclusion is critical reading not just something that any scholar is able to do. The way we read is partly determined by the intellectual traditions, which have formed our beliefs and thinking. Generally we read papers within our own culture or tradition less critically compared to our reading of papers from other traditions or "paradigms".

== A famous example ==
The psychologist Cyril Burt is known for his studies on the effect of heredity on intelligence. Shortly after he died, his studies of inheritance and intelligence came into disrepute after evidence emerged indicating he had falsified research data. A 1994 paper by William H. Tucker is illuminative on both how "critical reading" was performed in the discovery of the falsified data as well as in many famous psychologists "non-critical reading" of Burt's papers. Tucker shows that the recognized experts within the field of intelligence research blindly accepted Cyril Burt's research even though it was without scientific value and probably directly faked: They wanted to believe that IQ is hereditary and considered uncritically empirical claims supporting this view. This paper thus demonstrates how critical reading (and the opposite) may be related to beliefs as well as to interests and power structures.

== See also ==
- Critical literacy
- Critical thinking
- Exegesis
- Information literacy
- Source criticism

== Sources ==
- Althusser, Louis & Balibar, Étienne (1970). Reading Capital. Translated by Ben Brewster. London: New Left Books.
- Bazerman, Charles (1994). The Informed Writer: Using Sources in the Disciplines. 5 edition. Houghton Mifflin Company.
- Brody, Roberta (2008). The Problem of Information Naïveté. Journal of the American Society for Information Science and Technology, 59(7), 1124–1127.
- Dorfman, Ariel & Mattelart, Armand (1971). Para Leer al Pato Donald. Valparaíso, Chile: Ediciones Universitarias de Valparaíso. English translation: Dorfman, Ariel & Mattelart, Armand (1973). How to Read Donald Duck. Imperialist Ideology in the Disney Comic. New York: International General.
- Eco, Umberto (1992). Interpretation and overinterpretation. Cambridge: Cambridge University Press.
- Ekegren, P. (1999). The Reading of Theoretical Texts. A Critique of Criticism in the Social Sciences. London: Routledge. (Routledge Studies in Social and Political Thought, 19).
- Halpern, D. F. (2003), Thought & Knowledge: An Introduction to Critical Thinking, 4th ed., Lawrence Erlbaum Associates, Mahwah, NJ.
- Kuhn, T. S. (1962, 1970), The Structure of Scientific Revolutions. Chicago, IL: University of Chicago Press.
- Mallery, J. C.; Hurwitz, R. & Duffy, G. (1992). Hermeneutics. IN: Encyclopedia of Artificial Intelligence. Vol. 1-2. 2nd ed. Ed. by S.C. Shapiro (Vol 1, pp. 596–611). New York: John Wiley & Sons.
- Riegelman, Richard K. (2004). Studying a Study and Testing a Test: How to Read the Medical Evidence. 5th ed. Philadelphia, PA: Lippincott Williams & Wilkins.
- Slife, Brent D. & Williams, R. N. (1995). What's behind the research? Discovering hidden assumptions in the behavioral sciences. Thousand Oaks, CA: Sage Publications. ("A Consumers Guide to the Behavioral Sciences").
- Thurston, John (1993). Symptomatic reading. IN: Encyclopedia of contemporary literary theory: Approaches, scholars, terms. Ed. by Irena R. Makaryk. Toronto: University of Toronto Press. (P. 638).
- Tucker, William H. (1994). Facts and fiction in the discovery of Sir Cyril Burt's flaws. Journal of the History of the Behavioral Sciences, 30, 335-347.
