= Sam Holcroft =

British playwright and screenwriter

Sam Holcroft is a British playwright and screenwriter.

== Early life ==
Holcroft studied biology at the University of Edinburgh. During her time as a student she wrote two plays for the Edinburgh University Theatre Company and was part of the Traverse Theatre's young writers group. Initially intending to study for a Ph.D., she questioned her choices and took a year out from education, during which time she was commissioned for her first play.

Currently, Holcroft is a writer-in-residence at the Royal National Theatre.

== Awards and honours ==
- 2014 Windham–Campbell Literature Prize (Drama), valued at $150,000 one of the largest prizes in the world of its kind.

== Plays ==
- Cockroach (2008), produced by the Traverse Theatre and published by Nick Hern Books.
- Vanya (2009), inspired by Chekhov's Uncle Vanya, produced by the Gate Theatre and directed by Natalie Abrahami.
- Edgar and Annabel (2011), produced by the National Theatre and directed by Lyndsey Turner.
- The Wardrobe (2014), produced by the National Theatre in their studio space. The play was chosen for the National Theatre's Connections Festival, the annual festival of new plays curated for young performers.
- Rules for Living (13 March 2015), produced by the National Theatre in the Dorfman auditorium.
- A Mirror (2023), produced by Jeremy Herrin.

== Television ==
- The Rook (2019) – writer
