= Picturing Indians: Native Americans in Film, 1941–1960 =

2020 book by Liza Black

- Author: Liza Black
- Subject: Native Americans in film Golden Age of Hollywood
- Genre: Nonfiction
- Publisher: University of Nebraska Press
- Publication date: 2020
- Media type: Hardcover
- Pages: 354
- ISBN: 9780803296800
- Website: https://www.nebraskapress.unl.edu/nebraska/9780803296800/picturing-indians/

Picturing Indians: Native Americans in Film, 1941–1960 is a book by Liza Black. It was published by University of Nebraska Press in 2020.

The book examines the contributions of Native American people to the American film industry in the 1940s and 1950s.

== Content ==
The author, Liza Black, is an associate professor of History and Native American and Indigenous Studies at Indiana University.

The book examines the contributions of Native American people to the American film industry in the 1940s and 1950s, a period which the author describes as perhaps "the high point of racism and what would have seemed to be a hopeless moment for Native people in film". While many American films, particularly of the Western genre, have featured Native American characters, they were often portrayed by White actors in "redface", especially during the Golden Age of Hollywood. Modeled on the work of Cedric J. Robinson, Black's critical reading of the oeuvre reveals a message of resistance to and criticism of White society in the roles of Native American extras and actors in supporting roles. Black extends her analysis beyond actors to also include all contributions of Native labor to the films.

Picturing Indians includes an exhaustive filmography of Hollywood fiction films featuring Native American characters between 1941 and 1960, as well as broader filmography of similar films produced globally from 1914 to 2019, many directed or produced by indigenous people.

One reviewer criticized the paucity of photographs, given the subject matter. Black only included three images, including the cover photo of Native actor Jay Silverheels; the other two photos both illustrate a White actor (Rock Hudson) made up to look like a Native American.
