= Jacques Attali =

French economist

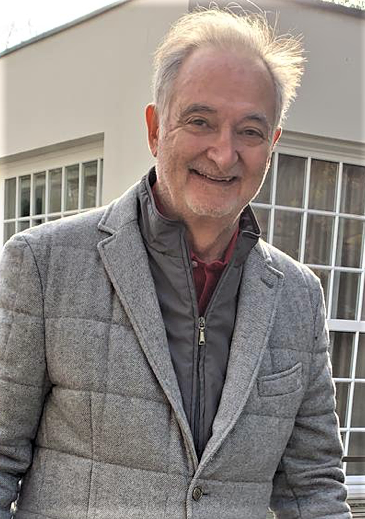
- Attali in Rovereto, 2012

President of the European Bank for Reconstruction and Development
- In office April 1991 – June 1993
- Preceded by: Position created
- Succeeded by: Jacques de Larosière

Personal details
- Born: Jacques José Mardoché Attali; 1 November 1943 (age 82) Algiers, French Algeria
- Relatives: Bernard Attali (twin brother)
- Education: École Polytechnique; École des Mines; Sciences Po; École nationale d'administration Paris Dauphine University
- Occupation: Economist, writer, senior civil servant

Jacques José Mardoché Attali (French pronunciation: [ʒak atali]; born 1 November 1943) is a French economic and social theorist, writer, political adviser and senior civil servant.

Between 1969 and 2023 Attali published 86 books.

Attali served as a counselor to President François Mitterrand from 1981 to 1991, and was the first head of the European Bank for Reconstruction and Development from 1991 to 1993. In 1997, upon the request of education minister Claude Allègre, he proposed a reform of the higher education degrees system. From 2008 to 2010, he led the government committee on how to ignite the growth of the French economy, under President Nicolas Sarkozy.

Attali co-founded the European program EUREKA, dedicated to the development of new technologies. He also founded the non-profit organization PlaNet Finance, now called Positive Planet, and is the head of Attali & Associates (A&A), an international consultancy firm on strategy, corporate finance and venture capital. Interested in the arts, he has been nominated to serve on the board of the Musée d'Orsay. He has published more than fifty books, including Verbatim (1981), Noise: The Political Economy of Music (1985), Labyrinth in Culture and Society: Pathways to Wisdom (1999), and A Brief History of the Future (2006).

In 2009, Foreign Policy called him as one of the top 100 "global thinkers" in the world.

== Early life ==
Jacques Attali was born on 1 November 1943 in Algiers (Algeria), with his twin brother Bernard Attali, in a Jewish family. His father, Simon Attali, is a self-educated person who achieved success in perfumery ("Bib et Bab" shop) in Algiers. He married Fernande Abécassis on 27 January 1943. On 11 February 1954, his mother gave birth to his sister, Fabienne. In 1956, two years after the beginning of the Algerian independence war (1954–1962), his father decided to move to Paris with his family.

Jacques and Bernard studied at the Lycée Janson-de-Sailly, in the 16th arrondissement, where they met Jean-Louis Bianco and Laurent Fabius. In 1966, Jacques graduated from the École polytechnique (first of the class of 1963). He also graduated from the École des mines, Sciences Po and the École nationale d'administration (third of the class of 1970).

In 1968, while doing an internship at the prefecture of a French department (Nièvre), he met for the second time with François Mitterrand, then president of the department, whom he had met for the first time three years before.

in 1972, Attali received a PhD in economics from University Paris Dauphine, for a thesis written under the supervision of Alain Cotta. Michel Serres was among the jury of his PhD.

In 1970, when he was 27, he became a member of the Council of State. In 1972, aged 29, he published his first two books, Analyse économique de la vie politique and Modèles politiques, for which he was awarded with a prize from the Academy of Sciences.

== Academic career ==
Jacques Attali taught economics from 1968 to 1985 at the Paris Dauphine University, at the École polytechnique and at the École des Ponts et chaussées.

In his laboratory in Dauphine, the IRIS, he gathered several young researchers Yves Stourdzé (who ran the European research program EUREKA co-founded by Jacques Attali), Jean-Hervé Lorenzi, and Érik Orsenna, but also leading figures in various fields (including journalism, mathematics, show business, financial analysis).

== Political career ==
Attali's close collaboration with François Mitterrand started in December 1973. He directed his political campaign during the presidential elections in 1974. He then became his main chief of staff in the opposition. After being elected president in 1981, Mitterrand named Attali his special adviser, and received notes from him every evening on economics, culture, politics, and other readings. Attali attended all the cabinet and Defense Council meetings, and all bilateral meetings between President Mitterrand and foreign heads of state or government. He welcomed Raymond Barre, Jacques Delors, Philippe Séguin, Jean-Luc Lagardère, Antoine Riboud, Michel Serres, and Coluche into his circle. He advised the president to hire Jean-Louis Bianco, Alain Boublil and several young, promising graduates from the École nationale d'administration (including François Hollande and Ségolène Royal).

In 1982, Attali pleaded for "economic rigour". Acting as Mitterrand's sherpa for the first ten years of his presidency, Attali organised the 8th G7 summit at Versailles in 1982 and the 15th G7 summit at the Grande Arche in 1989. He took an active part in the organization of the celebrations for the bicentenary of the French Revolution on 14 July 1989.

In 1997, upon the request of Claude Allègre, Attali proposed a reform of the tertiary education degree system which led to the implementation of the LMD model.

On 24 July 2007, he accepted a nomination from President Nicolas Sarkozy to chair the bipartisan Commission pour la libération de la croissance française (Commission for the Liberation of French Growth, also known as the Attali commission) charged with surveying "the bottlenecks that constrain growth" in the spirit of deregulation. The body was composed of 42 members freely appointed by Attali, mostly liberals and social democrats. Attali chose Emmanuel Macron, then an investment banker at Rothschild, as deputy to commissioner Josseline de Clausade. The radical recommendations presented in the commission's unanimous final report of 23 January 2008 included the deregulation of working hours and contracts, a boost to Sunday shopping, an end to regulated professions, and the removal of taxi licensing. Some of them were incorporated into the Loi de modernisation de l'économie of August 2008.

In February 2010, Attali was asked by Sarkozy to suggest ways out of the economic crisis, and his 42-member commission produced a new report by October 2010.

In April 2011, in Washington, D.C., the Woodrow Wilson International Center for Scholars of the United States' Smithsonian Institution presented the Woodrow Wilson Award for Public Service to Attali.

In 2012, President François Hollande ordered from Attali a report on the "positive economics" situation. The aim of this report was to put an end to the short-termism, to move from an individualistic economy based on the short-term to an economy based on public interest and the interest of future generations, to organize the transition from an old model based on the wealth economy to a model in which economic agents will have other obligations than profit maximization. The report, written by a wide-ranging commission and delivered in 2013, outlined 44 reforms. Some of its ideas were subsequently turned into law proposals by the Minister of Economy Emmanuel Macron.

Attali has supported Rattachism.

He is credited with having launched the political careers of presidents François Hollande and Emmanuel Macron. Attali met Macron in July 2007, probably through Hollande's friend Jean-Pierre Jouyet, made him a deputy rapporteur of the Attali commission, and in late 2010, at his own dinner party, formally introduced him to Hollande. Although Macron first met Hollande through Jouyet in 2006, he only became a member of Hollande's circle in 2010, which led to his appointment as the president's deputy secretary-general in May 2012.

== International career ==
In 1979, Attali co-founded the international NGO Action Against Hunger (Action Contre La Faim).

In 1984, he helped implement the European program EUREKA, dedicated to the "development of new technologies", the direction of which he entrusted to Yves Stourdzé.

In January 1989, he initiated a vast international plan of action against the disastrous flooding in Bangladesh.

In August 1989, during François Mitterrand's second mandate, Jacques Attali gave up politics and left the Elysée Palace. He founded the European Bank for Reconstruction and Development (EBRD), in London, and became its first president. He had initiated the idea of this institution in June 1989, before the fall of the Berlin Wall, in order to support the reconstruction of Eastern European countries. He chaired the Paris negotiating conference which led to the creation of the EBRD. Under his leadership, the EBRD promoted investments which aimed at protecting nuclear power plants, protecting the environment and, more generally, developing infrastructure, reinforcing private sector competitiveness and support transition to democracy.

In 1991, Attali invited Mikhail Gorbachev to the EBRD headquarters, in London, against the opinion of British Prime Minister John Major. By doing so, he compelled the heads of government of the G7, who were attending a summit in this town, to receive the Soviet head of state. After a stormy phone call between Jacques Attali and John Major, the British press started to criticize Attali and spread suspicions about his management of the institution. Uncontested details of the management of the EBRD – including of inefficiency and profligacy – were shocking. Some of these details were taken up by some French journalists. Attali explains his stance in a chapter of his book C'était François Mitterrand, entitled "Verbatim and the EBRD": "the work in question had been done under the supervision of an international working group to which I did not belong". Indeed, when Attali left the EBRD (voluntarily) the board of governors gave him final discharge for the management of the institution. However, his reputation never recovered.

In 1993, Attali won a libel suit; he had been accused of having reproduced in his book Verbatim, without François Mitterrand's authorization, secret archives and several sentences of the French head of State which were meant for another book. The Herald Tribune even published, on the front page, an article claiming (wrongly) that President Mitterrand had asked for the book to be withdrawn from sale. François Mitterrand confirmed in a long interview that he had asked Attali to write this book, and acknowledged that he had proofread it and had been given the opportunity to make corrections.

In 1998, Attali founded Positive Planet, a non-profit organization which is active in more than 80 countries, employing over 500 staff, and provides funding, technical assistance and advisory services to 10,000 microfinance players and stakeholders. Positive Planet is also active in France empoverished suburbs.

In 2001 Attali was subject to investigations on the charges of "concealment of company assets which have been misused and influence peddling". He was discharged on 27 October 2009 by the magistrate's court of Paris, "on the benefit of the doubt".

Attali advocates the establishment of a global rule of law, which will condition the survival of democracy through the creation of a new global order. He thinks the regulation of the economy by a global financial supervisory institution may be a solution to the financial crisis which started 2008. The financial institution is a first step towards the establishment of a democratic world government, of which the European Union can be a laboratory, which was all laid to bare in his 1981 book Verbatim.

== Private financial career ==
In 1994, he founded Attali & Associates (A&A), an international advisory firm which specializes in strategy consulting, corporate finance and venture capital to help companies' long-term development.

In 2012, Attali became a member of the supervisory board of Kepler Capital Markets, a Swiss broker based in Geneva. The same year, Crédit Agricole sold Cheuvreux, which employs about 700 people worldwide, to Kepler Capital Markets.

He presides over the supervisory board of Slate.fr.

== Music and arts ==
In September 2010, Attali was appointed as a member of the directorate of the Musée d'Orsay.

Attali has a passion for music: he plays the piano (he once played for the association Les Restos du Cœur), and wrote lyrics for Barbara. He is the author of the book Bruits (1977) (English: Noise: The Political Economy of Music), an essay which deals with the economy of music and the importance of music in the evolution of our societies.

In 1978, he played himself in Pauline et l'ordinateur, directed by Francis Fehr.

Since 2003, he directs the Grenoble University orchestra, open to amateurs, under Patrick Souillot. He performed very different pieces, which ranged from a symphony composed by Benda to Bach's violin concertos, a mass composed by Mozart, Barber's Adagio and Mendelssohn's double concerto for violin, piano and orchestra. In 2012, he conducted the Musiques en scène orchestra, performing the opening of the Barber of Sevilla and co-directed the Lamoureux Orchestra with his friend, the geneticist Daniel Cohen, during the gala of Technion University, in Paris. He also directed the Lausanne Sinfonietta in August and Ravel's Concerto in G with the Jerusalem Symphony Orchestra in Jerusalem and then in Paris. He also directed orchestra in Shanghai, Bondy, Marseille, London and Astana.

With Patrick Souillot, he created in 2012 a national organization following the model of the Fabrique Opéra Grenoble, which aims at coordinating the production of cooperative operas with the participation of students from vocational highschools.

== Literary work ==
The literary work of Attali covers a wide range of topics and almost every possible subject in the field of literature: mathematics, economic theory, essays, novels, biographies, memoirs, children's stories, and theater. It is probably difficult to find a common thread in his work.

All of his essays revolve around the daunting task of describing the future from a long-term analysis of the past. In order to accomplish this, he undertook the task of retelling the story of human activity and its various dimensions: music, time, property, France, nomadic life, health, the seas, modernity, global governance, love and death (Bruits, Histoires du temps, La nouvelle économie française, Chemin de sagesse, Au propre et au figuré, l'ordre cannibale, Consolations, l'homme nomade, Amours, Histoire de la modernité, Demain qui gouvernera le monde, Histoires de la mer).

He has also put forward several readers (Lignes d'horizon, Brève histoire de l'avenir, Vivement après demain) and several publications on analytical methods (Analyse économique de la vie politique, Modèles politiques, Les trois mondes, La figure de Fraser, Peut-on prévoir l'avenir ?).

His work reveals a distinct vision of history and its successive stages, which are simultaneously ideological, technological and geopolitical. Furthermore, his work entails depicting the slow transformation of humanity into an artifact in which man becomes an object to escape death, and the geopolitical evolution toward chaos that accompanies such transformation; meanwhile, man is also waiting for an awakening leading to a new global governance, a sanctification of the essential makeup of mankind, taking into account the interest of future generations, and not letting prostheses invade it.

Attali has also, in books written during key events, tried to highlight particular moments of the present and the near future (La crise et après ?, Tous ruinés dans dix ans ?, Économie de l'apocalypse) and he proposed reforms to implement, either in books he authored (Candidats, répondez !, Urgences françaises) or in collective reports (Rapport sur l'évolution de l'enseignement supérieur, sur la libération de la croissance, sur l'économie positive, sur la francophonie).

Attali also reflected on the future of the concepts of socialism and altruism (La voie humaine, Fraternités) and advocated methods of personal growth (Survivre aux crises, Devenir soi).

Since his earliest books, Attali foresaw and announced signals of the future, albeit weak at the time, that later came true: In La parole et l'outil (1976), he announced and described the shift from an energy-based society to an information-based society. In Bruits, in 1977, he announced what would later be the internet, YouTube, and the importance of musical practice; in La nouvelle économie française, in 1978, he discussed the coming emergence of the personal computer, hyper-surveillance and self-surveillance. In Les trois mondes, in 1980, he announced the shift of the centre of power around the Pacific. In L'ordre Cannibale, in 1980, he announced the advent of a prosthetic society, now known as transhumanism. In Histoires du temps, he announced the rapid pace of history and the growing immediacy of relationships. In Amours, he announced the emergence of poly-romantic relationships. In Au propre et au figuré, he announced the break-up of property and its use, and subsequently he invented the concept of the "nomadic object." In Lignes d'horizons, in 1990, he predicted the relative decline of US power. In Brève histoire de l'avenir, he announced a corporate power grab by health data and insurance companies. In L'homme nomade, he described the great movement of populations whose sedentary life was only a temporary stage.

Attali has reflected on the many dimensions, as well as the place, of Jewish thought and the Jewish people in history (1492, Histoire économique du peuple juif, Dictionnaire amoureux du judaïsme); he also took on this subject at the theatre in Du cristal à la fumée.

He also reflected on inter-religious dialogue (La confrérie des Eveillés and Naissance de l'Occident).

The focus of his biographical publishing is on retelling the lives of characters who disrupted world history by the strength of their ideas: Warburg, Pascal, Marx, Gandhi, Diderot, and all those for whom he wrote a short biography in Phares, such as Averroes, Aristotle, Maimonides, Thomas Aquinas, Giordano Bruno, Darwin.

Attali's novels, mostly categorized in fantasy genre, or at least in the slight dystopia subgenre, address the same themes. In particular, his novels revolve around the risks confronted by humanity, with characters anxious to hide, to disappear (Nouvelles Le premier jour après moi, Il viendra, Notre vie disent- ils). In 1999, he made his debut as a playwright with Les Portes du ciel, about the post-abdication life of Emperor Charles V. The play, which premiered with Gérard Depardieu in the lead role, was poorly received by critics but successful with French audiences.

More recently, he has chosen to combine crime novels with dystopia, imagining a reappearing police chief, whilst the action takes place in a near future period.

Attali has narrated some of the major events in which he was involved in several memoirs: first, in Verbatim 1, 2 and 3, he kept, at the request of François Mitterrand, the daily newspaper in the years during Mitterrand's presidency. He also recounted his memories of the creation of the European Bank for Reconstruction and Development in Europe(s) and drew a portrait of François Mitterrand in C'était François Mitterrand, from the twenty years he spent at his side.

== Selected bibliography ==
- Cannibalism and Civilization: Life and Death in the History of Medicine (1984)
- Noise: The Political Economy of Music (1985) Translated by Brian Massumi. Foreword by Fredric Jameson, afterword by Susan McClary. University of Minnesota Press ISBN 0-8166-1287-0.
- A man of influence: Le destin d'un homme d'influence S.G. Warburg (1987)
- Millennium: Winners and Losers in the Coming Order (1992)
- Europe(s) (1994) ISBN 22-135-9172-5
- Labyrinth in Culture and Society: Pathways to Wisdom (1999) Translated by Joseph Rowe. North Atlantic Books ISBN 1-55643-265-8
- Fraternités (1999) ISBN 84-493-0977-8
- Karl Marx or the thought of the world (2005) - original title: Karl Marx ou l'esprit du monde
- Les Juifs, le Monde et l'Argent, Histoire économique du peuple juif (2002) Fayard (The Jews, the World and Money, an Economic History of the Jewish People) ISBN 2-253-15580-2
- C'était François Mitterrand (2005) Fayard
- A Brief History of the Future (2006) Arcade Publishing ISBN 1-55970-879-4 - original title: Une Brève histoire de l'avenir
- La crise, et après ? (2008) Fayard ISBN 2-213-64307-5
- The economic history of the Jewish people (2010)

== See also ==
- Social innovation
- Sound culture
- Fukushima Daiichi nuclear disaster
