= Javier Esteinou Madrid =

Mexican journalist, professor and researcher

- Born: March 4, 1949 (age 77)
- Citizenship: Mexican
- Education: Universidad Iberoamericana National Autonomous University of Mexico
- Writing career
- Notable awards: 2010 and 2014 National Journalism Prize (Mexico)
- Website: Blog

Javier Esteinou Madrid (born March 4, 1949) is a Mexican journalist, professor and researcher whose work has been recognized with Level III membership in the Sistema Nacional de Investigadores and with Mexico’s National Journalism Prize twice. His work is mostly concerned with the effects of cultural hegemony and new technologies on communications and society.

== Life ==
Esteinou was born and raised in Mexico City. He began his higher education in this city beginning in 1967 studying philosophy at the Instituto Superior de Estudios Filosóficos but soon after left this school to study communication at the Universidad Iberoamericana, graduating in 1974. He went on to get his masters in sociology from the same institution and then his doctorate in sociology at the National Autonomous University of Mexico.

== Career ==
Esteinou’s first professional position was with his alma mater, the Iberoamericana in 1978, working with the Secretary General. Since then he has held numerous positions including with the Subsecretary for Radio Transmission as a researcher as well as for the Mexico City government, CONACULTA the office of the Mexican president the Secretaría de Gobernación, the Mexican Television Institute, the Latin American Institute for Transnational Studies, the Mexican Borders Cultural Program, UNICEF, National System of Broadcast Education (Middle School), the Ricardo J. Zevada Cultural Research and Studies Foundation and the Institutional Revolutionary Party .

He has worked as a journalist for newspapers such as Excélsior and El Universal .

As an educator, he has worked primarily with the Universidad Autónoma Metropolitana as a professor and researcher since 1974, where he has served as the founder and director of the Centro de Documentación para la Comunicación Masiva. . He also taught at the Universidad Iberoamericana from 1975 to 1992. In 1992 he began teaching at the Centro de Servicio y Promoción Social. He currently teaches classes at the Seminario de Investigación with the masters program of the Communications Department. He also teaches classes at the Tec de Monterrey, Mexico City Campus .

He is a member of the Consejo Nacional para la Enseñanza e Investigación de las Ciencias de la Comunicación (CONEICC) and vice president of the Asociación Latinoamericana de Investigadores de la Comunicación and the Federación de Facultades de Comunicación en América Latina. He was the vice president of the Asociación Mexicana de Investigadores de la Comunicación (AMIC) . (sistemnac)

== Recognitions ==
His work has been recognized with Level III membership in the Sistema Nacional de Investigadores the Gabino Barrero Silver Medal for academic merit awarded by UNAM, the International Prize of the Latin American Communications Book Contest (Concurso Latinoamericano del Libro de Comunicación) awarded by the Friederik Ebert Foundation and the 2004 and the 2011 National Communications Prize awarded by the Pages Llergo Foundation and Siempre magazine.

He won the Mexico’s National Journalism Prize twice, once in 2010 and again in 2014.

== Publications ==
Esteinou’s first major publications were his masters’ thesis (Los Medios de Difusión Masiva en la Formación Social Capitalista) in 1978 and his doctoral thesis (Aparatos de Información de Masas y Formación del Consenso) in 1983. He has published over 47 books in Mexico and seven abroad, along with numerous peer-reviews articles and those for newspapers.

Esteinou writes mostly about communication and culture in Mexico and the rest of Latin America. In the 1980s, he began critiquing communications and the effects of new technologies on it and society in general starting in the 1980s. In his work he often demonstrates a concern for the influence that the mass media has, the construction of hegemony, free trade agreements, the influence of television and the Internet on youth, neoliberalism and the defense of Mexican national and popular culture. His work is influenced by that of Louis Althusser, Antonio Gramsci and Armand Mattelart. His work has made him an expert to be interviewed in radio, television and in the press.

Major publications include:

- La Ley Televisa y la Lucha por el Poder en México (with Alma Rosa Alva de la Selva) (2009)
- Sociedad Moderna y Medios de Comunicación (1995)
- El Sistema Morelos de Satélites y su Impacto en la Sociedad Mexicana (1992) (1995)
- Televisión Pública y Desarrollo Cultural (1994)
- La Cultura y la Comunicación Nacionales en los Tiempos del Libre Mercado (1993)
- Medios de Comunicación y Construcción de la Hegemonía (1992)
- La Televisión Mexicana ante el Nuevo Modelo de Desarrollo Neoliberal (1991)
- Hacia la Primavera del Espíritu Nacional: Propuesta Cultural para una Nueva Televisión Mexicana (1989)
- Economía Política y Medios de Comunicación: Acumulación, Ideología y Poder (1985)
- Medios de Comunicación y Construcción de la Hegemonía (1983)
