= Jean-Didier Blanchet =

French business executive

Jean-Didier François Charles Blanchet (born 2 December 1939) is a French business executive, and a former Chief Executive of Air France.

== Early life ==
He attended the École Polytechnique in 1959.

== Career ==
=== Government ===
From 1969 to 1972, he worked for the DGAC (Direction générale de l'Aviation civile, then known as the Secrétariat Générale de l'Aviation Civile), the French civil aviation authority. From 1972 to 1973 he worked for RATP (Régie autonome des transports parisiens).

From 2002 to 2008 he worked for the Ministry of Ecology and Sustainable Development (Ministère de l'Ecologie, du Développement durable), in the CGEDD (Conseil général de l'environnement et du développement durable). Since 2006 he has worked with the French division of CARE (relief agency) (Cooperative for American Remittances to Europe).

=== Air France ===
He joined Air France in 1977.

From March 1988 to November 1993 he was Chief Executive (Directeur général) of Air France.

=== Le Méridien ===
From 1993 to 1996 he worked for Le Méridien as Chairman, the worldwide hotel chain owned by Air France.

== See also ==
- Bernard Attali, Chairman of Air France from 1988 to 1993

Business positions
Preceded by	Chairman of Le Méridien; 1993 - 1996	Succeeded by
Preceded by	Chief Executive of Air France; March 1988 - November 1993	Succeeded by
