= Henri Franck =

- Born: December 2, 1888
- Died: February 25, 1912 (aged 23)
- Notable work: La danse devant l'Arche

Henri Franck (December 2, 1888 – February 25, 1912) was a French Jewish poet, best known for his long poem La danse devant l'Arche.

== Life ==
Henri Franck was born in Paris into a family of the Jewish bourgeoisie. His father was a sugar merchant and prominent Zionist. His great-grandfather was Arnaud Aron, chief rabbi of Strasbourg, and among his cousins were Henri Bergson and Emmanuel Berl.

He entered the École normale supérieure in 1906, aged 17. He was an exceptional student; he became deeply versed in French literature and ancient and modern philosophy, and was particularly interested in Spinoza and Nietzsche. As Henri Massis recounts in his memoirs, Franck organized the resistance to the Action Française efforts against Amédée Thalamas, a history professor at the Lycée Condorcet. When, after having cast doubt on the divine inspiration of Joan of Arc, Thalamas was violently beaten by members of the Camelots du Roi, "the École normale, mobilized by [Franck's] efforts, armed with clubs and wearing blue ribbons, went down the rue de l'Ulm to fight in the Latin Quarter, following their young chief, drunk with warlike joy." Franck later had an affair with Anna de Noailles, who was eleven years his senior; she wrote a preface to La danse devant l'Arche. Contemporary sources claim this affair was simply platonic; Emmanuel Berl writes that: "Sexuality was, for [Franck], simply a country he did not know yet, that he would visit one day, like Brittany." In 1909, despite his academic excellence to this point, he neglected his studies and failed the oral exam for his agrégation in Philosophy.

Franck's poem La danse devant l'Arche (English: The Dance Before the Ark) was one of the first works published by the Nouvelle Revue Française, in 1911. The poem of 2,000 verses, written with the encouragement of André Spire, sought to reconcile biblical revelation with the French Enlightenment, and figures the poet as David dancing in front of the Ark of the Covenant. Some of the principal poetic influences for La danse devant l'Arche were Paul Claudel and the Dreyfusard Catholic writer Charles Péguy, along with Walt Whitman and Arthur Rimbaud. Franck, like most French Jews, was deeply disturbed by the Dreyfus Affair, and anxiety around the reconcilability of Frenchness and Judaism, and the rising tide of nationalist antisemitism, is evident throughout the poem.

Franck died of tuberculosis in 1912, aged 23, two years after being diagnosed.

He was the inspiration for the titular hero of Silbermann, a 1922 novel by Jacques de Lacratelle. Lacratelle was friends with Franck at the Lycée Janson-de-Sailly.
