= Lycée Janson-de-Sailly =

Secondary school in Paris, France

Coordinates: 48°51′55.28″N 2°16′47.60″E

- 106 Rue de la Pompe; 75016 Paris; France

Information
- Type: Public
- Established: 1884
- Principal: Patrick Fournier
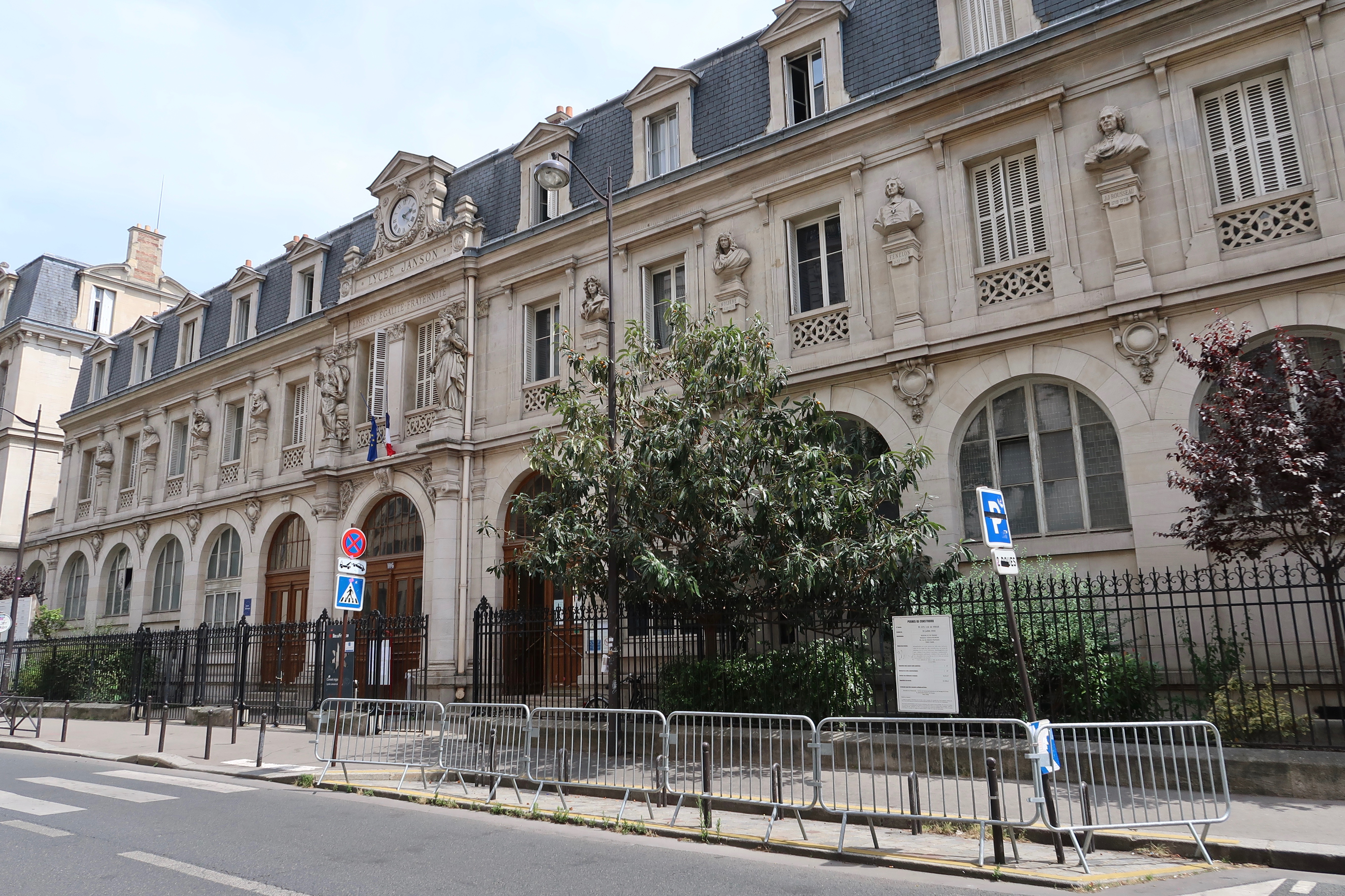
- Front entrance of the school.

Lycée Janson-de-Sailly is a lycée located in the 16th arrondissement of Paris, France. The lycéens of Janson are called les jansoniens and they usually refer to their high school as Janson, or JdS. It is the biggest academic institution in the region: 3,200 boys and girls from 11 to 20 attend classes ranging from junior high school to Classes Préparatoires.

== History ==
Alexandre-Emmanuel-François Janson de Sailly (1782-1829) was a wealthy Parisian lawyer, who found out that his wife Marie-Jeanne Joséphine Berryer had a lover. Therefore, he decided to disinherit her and to bequeath all of his fortune to the State, under the condition that it be used to establish a modern high school that would offer an excellent education and in which no women would be allowed. After his death, his widow attempted to quash his will until her death in 1876, without any success.

The lycée was built in the 1880s: the first stone being put on October 16, 1881 by Jules Ferry, who spoke about the "lycée of the new times." Victor Hugo who lived nearby made a speech for the inauguration, on October 13, 1884.

The lycée Janson-de-Sailly was the first Republican lycée of France (the others started as royal or imperial establishments); it aimed at training the future French scientific, literary, military, industrial, diplomatic and political male élites of the young Third Republic.

It gained a national reputation, and attracted students from around the country. It also became one of the lycées of Parisian high society. The motto of the lycée was Pour la Patrie, par le livre et par l'épée (For the Homeland, by the book and by the sword). Many alumni joined the military, and participated in the conquest of the French Colonial Empire, especially in Africa.

In 1944, a few hundred Jansonians managed to leave the lycée and joined the French Free Forces (the 1st Army of Jean de Lattre de Tassigny): they founded le 2ème Bataillon de Choc, also known as Bataillon Janson-de-Sailly and the bataillons des bacheliers. They faced the German divisions in Alsace (especially in the battles of Masevaux and Colmar) during the counter-attack of Ardennes, and entered Germany with General Patton's forces in 1945.

The first female pupils would be admitted in 1959.

Commemorative plaques near the entrances of several classrooms and halls in the school buildings honor the memories of its alumni - including the war hero Roland Garros.

== Teaching ==
Nowadays, the 3,200 students are equally divided into the three traditional formations of the French Education System : collège (30 classes with collégiens from 11 to 14), lycée (30 classes with lycéens from 14 to 18) and Classes Préparatoires aux Grandes écoles or prépas (30 classes with students from 18 to 20).

In France, students must study two foreign or regional languages. The first choice at Janson is English or German. The second choice foreign language is: English, German, Spanish, Italian, Chinese or Russian. In classes préparatoires, there is even more choice with German, English, Arabic, Spanish, Italian, Russian as first language and all the aforementioned languages plus Japanese and Chinese as a second language. A student in Classes préparatoires can also take another second language not amongst those above. But those languages are available only through a partnership (the "Langues Inter-établissement") with other lycées with a wilder range of languages. The student would then study at Janson but go to another lycée to attend its foreign language class. For instance, the lycée Montaigne provides Portuguese and Polish and the lycée Buffon offers Hebrew and Swedish.

The Lycée offers an AbiBac section, with German history classes taught by a native speaker. The students taking part in the section will take the Abitur and the Baccalauréat exams at the end of 12th grade.

== Ranking ==
Due to its geographical location, and to the number of its important alumni, Janson de Sailly has a high reputation. Its scholastic ranking puts it at or above the median for area schools. According to the sociologists Michel Pinçon and Monique Pinçon-Charlot the school is predominantly attended by children from the upper class or from the aristocracy because of its location (the wealthy 16th arrondissement of Paris).

== Notable alumni ==
=== Politics and government ===
- Jacques Attali (born 1943), political adviser
- Robert Badinter (born 1928), French Minister of Justice
- Jean-Louis Bianco (born 1943), French Minister of Transport
- Édouard Bonnefous (1907-2007), French Minister of Commerce
- Jean-Louis Borloo (born 1951), French Minister of Ecology
- Élisabeth Borne (born 1961), Prime Minister of France
- Pierre Brossolette (1903-1944), member of the French Resistance
- Olivier Dassault (1951-2021), French MP
- Bernard Debré (1944-2020), French Minister of Development
- Laurent Fabius (born 1946), Prime Minister of France
- Edgar Faure (1908-1988), Prime Minister of France
- Olivier Giscard d'Estaing (1927-2021), French MP
- Valéry Giscard d'Estaing (1926-2020), President of France
- Bruno Gollnisch (born 1950), MEP
- Prince Peter of Greece and Denmark (1908-1980)
- Jean-Marcel Jeanneney (1910-2010), French Minister of Justice
- Lionel Jospin (1937-2026), Prime Minister of France
- Ibrahim Boubacar Keïta (1945-2022), President of Mali
- Patrick Leclercq (born 1938), Minister of State of Monaco
- Philippe Malaud (1925-2007), French Minister of Information
- Martin Malvy (born 1936), French Minister of Budget
- Lennart Meri (1929-2006), President of Estonia
- Frédéric Mitterrand (1947-2024), French Minister of Culture
- Édouard Philippe (born 1970), Prime Minister of France
- Jean Sainteny (1907-1978), French Minister of Veteran Affairs
- Maurice Schumann (1911-1998), French Minister of Foreign Affairs
- Jean-Jacques Servan Schreiber (1924-2006), French Minister of Reform
- Mohammed Zahir Shah (1914-2007), King of Afghanistan

=== Military ===
- François d'Astier de la Vigerie (1886–1956), French General
- Henri Honoré d'Estienne d'Orves (1901-1941), member of the French Resistance
- Pierre Marie Gallois (1911-2010), French General
- Roland Garros (1888-1918), military aviator
- Jacques Lanxade (born 1934), French admiral

=== Science ===
- Élie Cartan (1869-1951), mathematician
- Jean Favard (1902-1965), mathematician
- Jean Baptiste Perrin (1870-1942), physicist, Nobel Prize in Physics laureate
- Christiane Klapisch-Zuber, (1936-2024), historian and anthropologist
- Laurent Schwartz (1915-2002), mathematician, Fields Medalist
- Jean-Claude Sikorav (born 1957), mathematician
- Hervé This (born 1955), chemist

=== Humanities ===
- Philippe Ariès (1914-1984), historian
- Pierre Assouline (born 1953), essayist
- Claude Aveline (1901-1992), essayist
- Jacques Barzun (1907-2012), historian
- Alain Bernheim (1931–2022), essayist
- Pierre Bertaux (1907-1986), scholar
- Laurent-Emmanuel Calvet (born 1969), economist
- Jean Daujat (1906-1998), philosopher
- Régis Debray (born 1940), philosopher
- Alain Decaux (1925-2016), historian
- Charles Du Bos (1882-1939), essayist
- Émile Faguet (1947-1916), essayist
- François Furet (1927-1997), historian
- Bertrand Gille (1920-1980), historian
- Paul Guth (1910-1997), essayist
- Henri Lepage (born 1941), economist
- Claude Lévi-Strauss (1908-2009), anthropologist
- Maurice Merleau-Ponty (1908-1961), philosopher
- Matthieu Ricard (born 1946), Buddhist monk
- George Steiner (1929-2020), essayist
- Benjamin Stora (born 1950), historian
- Jean Wahl (1888-1974), philosopher

=== Arts ===
- Richard Anthony (1920-2006), singer
- Gilbert Amy (born 1936), composer and conductor
- Claude Autant-Lara (1901-2000), film director
- Christian Bérard (1902-1949), designer
- Richard Berry (born 1950), actor
- Sinclair (born 1970), singer
- Carla Bruni-Sarkozy (born 1967), singer and model
- Alejo Carpentier (1904-1980), writer
- Emmanuel Carrère (born 1957), writer
- Roger Chastel (1897-1981), painter
- René Crevel (1900-1935), writer
- Jean-Loup Dabadie (1938-2020), writer
- Pierre Daninos (1913-2005), writer
- Michel Déon (1919-2016), writer
- Jean Dutourd (1920-2011), writer
- Henri Franck (1888-1912), writer
- Franc-Nohain (1872-1934), writer
- Jean Gabin (1904-1976), actor
- José Giovanni (1923-2004), film director
- Julien Green (1900-1998), writer
- Sacha Guitry (1885-1957), film director
- Georges Hugnet (1906-1974), graphic artist
- Sébastien Izambard (born 1973), singer
- Pierre Klossowski (1905-2001), writer
- Philippe Labro (1936-2025), writer
- Jacques de Lacretelle (1888-1985), writer
- Patrice de La Tour du Pin (1911-1975), poet and hymnodist
- Georges Lautner (1926-2013), film director
- Michel Leiris (1901-1990), writer
- Roger Martin du Gard (1881-1958), writer, Nobel Prize in Literature laureate
- Robert Merle (1908-2004), writer
- Oscar Milosz (1877-1939), writer
- Henry de Montherlant (1895-1972), writer
- Philippe Noiret (1930-2006), actor
- Germain Nouveau (1851-1920), writer
- Gérard Oury (1919-2006), film director
- Jean Piat (1924–2018), actor
- Charles Picart Le Doux (1881-1959), painter
- Raymond Roussel (1877-1933), writer
- Jean-Christophe Rufin (born 1952), writer
- Preston Sturges (1898-1959), film director
- Paul Vaillant-Couturier (1892-1937), writer
- Ray Ventura (1908-1979), jazzman
- Pierre Wiazemsky (born 1949), press caricaturist (signing as 'Wiaz')

=== Business ===
- Bernard Attali (born 1943), CEO of Air France
- François-Marie Banier (born 1947), Liliane Bettencourt's adviser
- Vincent Bolloré (born 1952), billionaire, CEO of Bolloré
- Cyril Bourlon de Rouvre (born 1945), businessman
- Martin Bouygues (born 1952), billionaire, CEO of Bouygues
- Serge Dassault (1925-2018), billionaire, CEO of Dassault Group
- Arnaud Lagardère (born 1961), CEO of Lagardère Group
- Robert Louis-Dreyfus (1946-2009), owner of the Olympique de Marseille
- Raoul Nordling (1881-1962), businessman
- Ernest-Antoine Seillière (born 1930), former head of the MEDEF
- J. R. D. Tata (1904–1993), French-born Indian industrialist, founder, aviator, philanthropist andchairman of Tata Group
- Léon Zitrone (1914-1995), TV host

=== Sports ===
- Robert Abdesselam (1920-2006), tennis player
- William Grover-Williams (1903-1945), racing driver

== Sister schools ==
- Hangzhou Foreign Language School
- Yeouido Girls High School
