= Noise: The Political Economy of Music =

Book by Jacques Attali

- First Edition 1977 by Presses Universitaires de France
- Author: Jacques Attali
- Translator: Brian Massumi
- Cover artist: Pieter Breughel the Elder; The Fight Between Carnival and Lent (1559)
- Language: French / English
- Genre: Non-fiction
- Publisher: Presses Universitaires de France/ University of Minnesota Press (US)
- Publication date: 1977
- Publication place: France
- Media type: Print
- ISBN: 0-8166-1286-2
- OCLC: 11549283
- Dewey Decimal: 780/.07 19
- LC Class: ML3795 .A913 1985

Noise: The Political Economy of Music is a book by French economist and scholar Jacques Attali which is about the role of music in the political economy.

Attali's essential argument in Noise: The Political Economy of Music (French title: Bruits: essai sur l'economie politique de la musique) is that music, as a cultural form, is intimately tied up in the mode of production in any given society. Although this idea is familiar in strands of Marxism, the novelty of Attali's work is that it reverses the traditional understandings about how revolutions in the mode of production take place:

"[Attali] is the first to point out the other possible logical consequence of the “reciprocal interaction” model—namely, the possibility of a superstructure to anticipate historical developments, to foreshadow new social formations in a prophetic and annunciatory way. The argument of Noise is that music, unique among the arts for reasons that are themselves overdetermined, has precisely this annunciatory vocation; that the music of today stands both as a promise of a new, liberating mode of production, and as the menace of a dystopian possibility which is that mode of production’s baleful mirror image."

== Attali's four stages of music ==
Attali believes that music has gone through four distinct cultural stages in its history: Sacrificing, Representing, Repeating, and a fourth cultural stage which could roughly be called Post-Repeating. These stages are each linked to a certain "mode of production"; that is to say, each of these stages carries with it a certain set of technologies for producing, recording and disseminating music, and also concomitant cultural structures that allow for music's transmission and reception.

Sacrificing refers to the pre-history of modern music—the period of purely oral tradition. In historical terms, this period could be dated to anytime before about 1500 AD. This is the period before mass-produced, notated music—a period when the musical tradition exists solely in the memory of people, generally in the form of oral songs and folktales. Here, Attali characterizes music as being contrasted to the "noise" of nature—of death, chaos and destruction. In other words, music stands in contrast to all of those natural forces that threaten man and his cultural heritage. The purpose of music in this era is to preserve and transmit that cultural heritage, by using music to reinforce memory. Music in this period is ubiquitous and often tied up in festival. He calls the chapter Sacrificing because in this era, music is a ritualized, structuralized sublimation of the violence of nature.

Representing refers to the era of printed music—roughly 1500–1900 AD. During this era, music becomes tied to a physical medium for the first time, and therefore becomes a commodity for sale in the marketplace. During this era, Attali characterizes music as being a spectacle that is contrasted to silence—think of the hushed anticipation that greets the professional performer in the concert hall. During this era, music also becomes separated from the human life-world: no longer the purview of peasants at their labor, music becomes a highly complex, mechanical process that is articulated by specialists. He calls this chapter Representing because the project of the performer is to "re-present" music—to bring it out of absence and into presence by drawing the intent of the composer from the page and articulating it to a waiting audience:

"Beginning in the eighteenth century, ritualized belonging became representation. The musician… became a producer and seller of signs who was free in appearance, but in fact almost always exploited and manipulated by his clients ... The attitude of music then changed profoundly: in ritual, it was one element in the totality of life... In contrast, in representation there was a gulf between the musicians and the audience; the most perfect silence reigned in the concerts of the bourgeoisie... The trap closed: the silence greeting the musicians was what created music and gave it autonomous existence, a reality. Instead of being a relation, it was no longer anything more than a monologue of specialists competing in front of consumers. The artist was born, at the same time that his work went on sale..." (Attali, 46–47)

Repeating refers to the era of recorded and broadcast sound—roughly 1900 AD-present. During this period, notation (which could be thought of as a highly coded, written guide to how music should be sounded) was replaced by recording (which is the sounding of music, trapped and preserved on vinyl, tape or disc). During this era, Attali asserts that the goal of music is not memory or quality, but fidelity—the goal of those engaged in the musical project (which includes not only composers and performers, but sound engineers, studio execs and the like) is to record sound as clearly and flawlessly as possible, and to perfectly reproduce these recordings. In this era, each musical work is contrasted to the other versions of itself—the key question for the musician becomes: how faithfully can he re-produce the "original" recording? Attali calls this chapter Repeating, then, because each musical act is a repetition of what came before: music is made up of ever-more-perfect echoes of itself:

"The advent of recording thoroughly shattered representation. First produced as a way of preserving its trace, it instead replaced it as the driving force of the economy of music… for those trapped by the record, public performance becomes a simulacrum of the record: an audience generally familiar with the artist’s recordings attends to hear a live replication… For popular music, this has meant the gradual death of small bands, who have been reduced to faithful imitations of recording stars. For the classical repertory, it means the danger… of imposing all of the aesthetic criteria of repetition—made of rigor and cold calculation—upon representation." (Attali, 85)

Also important to Repeating are Attali’s ideas of Exchange-Time and Use-Time. Attali defines Exchange-Time as the time spent towards earning the money needed to purchase a recording, whereas Use-Time involves the time spent listening to recordings by the purchaser. In a society made up of recording labels and radio stations, far more recordings are produced than an individual can listen to in a lifetime, and in an effort to spend more time in Use-Time than in Exchange-Time people begin to stockpile recordings of what they want to hear. Attali states that this stockpiling has become the main method of use by consumers, and in doing so, shorter musical works have been valorized. More importantly, according to Attali, this process of stockpiling removes the social and political power from music. (Attali, 101)

Attali hints at a Post-Repeating era in his chapter 'Composing', but never fully develops his theory of it. While many readers consider this to be influenced by electronic musical techniques such as sampling, remixing and electronic manipulation (which were common in 1985 when the English translation was published), it is doubtful that they would have influenced Attali given that "Noise" was first published in French in 1977 (and one can assume the manuscript was completed at least several months prior to publication). Still, a style of music created from the manipulation of recorded material known musique concrète was created in France in 1948 and institutionalized in the form of the Groupe de recherches musicales (GRM) for nearly three decades at the time of the book's composition.
