= Modern capitalist society =

Modern capitalist society is a term used to describe a type of capitalist society in which a capitalist class of "new elites" and "old elites" concerned with maximizing their wealth secures a political system that serves and protects their interests, leading to the development of a wage-earning class. The term is commonly used by historians to refer to a transition from a premodern feudal society to a modern capitalist society, with consensus being that England emerged as the first modern capitalist society through the English Civil War (1642-51) and the Glorious Revolution (1688-89). Historians identify that the transition into modern capitalist society is often defined by a bourgeois revolution in which rising elites secure a system of representative democracy, rather than direct democracy, that serves their interests over the interests of the previously ruling royal aristocracy, such as in the American Revolution.

Modern capitalist societies rely on calculated and systematic production, different from the merchant capitalism of the Italian city-states, and are defined by the existence of a wage-earning class that functions as the counterpart to a capitalist class. They are described as highly competitive and individualistic, focusing on private interests over public welfare, through prioritizing commodity production and profit maximization. Defending private property, preserving law and order, maintaining the economic exploitation and political impotence of the wage-earning class, training the wage-earning class in the tasks that modern capitalist society requires to function, educating the wage-earning class to internalize the principles of capitalist-democracy, often through forms of propaganda in the mass media, and conditioning the wage-earning class to believe that they are autonomous and live in a society ruled by the citizenry, have all been identified by scholars as forces which maintain modern capitalist societies.

Modern capitalist societies are positioned in Western culture as a phase of human progression that is superior or "more advanced" than "premodern" forms of society. This perspective was most evidently portrayed through colonial logics which asserted that Indigenous peoples belonged to more "primitive" cultures and therefore should assimilate into more "civilized" societies or face genocide (e.g., "Kill the Indian, Save the Man"). For Marxists, anarchists, and others, modern capitalist society is a phase which will eventually lead to the emergence of a qualitatively different form of society. In opposition, liberals and others are opposed to the structural transformation of modern capitalist society.

== Ideological origins ==
Modern capitalist societies center the concept of means-end rationality, also referred to as instrumental rationality and formal rationality, and its inherent association with domination over nature, so as to manipulate it to suit material needs, and human beings, so as to organize and discipline them in their control over nature. Means-end rationality has held importance in Western culture for longer than modern capitalist societies have existed and historians have identified that this concept may have origins as early as Homer.

=== Weber ===
According to sociologist Max Weber, modern capitalist society "arose out of the moral calling of Calvinists; more specifically, the doctrine of predestination which resulted in new tensions between the individual and society and encouraged the believer to rationalize the objectivity of his belief (his or her productive contribution to the accumulation of capital)." As Weber theorized:

The objectivization of one's beliefs was predicated on the distinction between instrumental reality (the actual enactment and application of the prevailing norms and rules of society) and value rationality (how moral beliefs and values define the meaning and scope of these rules and laws). The growth of modern society, in this sense, referred to the creation of large bureaucracies, police forces, and legislative bodies: all autonomous rational structures of the state and modern capitalist society embodying the effects and ends of instrumental rationality. The legitimacy of these institutions thus reflected the dominant function assumed by these institutions in maintaining and administering societal order. [...] The result of this evolving orientation was that citizens learned to obey societal laws which, in turn, served as the basis of dominant and legitimate types of authority in society.

Weber perceived bureaucratization as an efficient institutional representation of rationality in modern capitalist society, yet also recognized how this could be "potentially dehumanizing, even malevolent, in its impersonality and possible elevation of economic efficiency and profit-maximization over human values and social justice. Weber was genuinely alarmed by the prospect that an institutionalized, morally vacuous or pernicious instrumental, and especially, formal, rationality might be used to justify morally questionable ends. Such rationality could potentially strip individuals of their freedom and dignity, placing them, metaphorically, in an 'iron cage' of despair."

== Historical lineage ==
The first modern capitalist society has its origins in England with the English Civil War (1642-51) and the Glorious Revolution (1688-89), which has been identified by historians as a bourgeois revolution that resulted in the transition from a traditional feudal society to a modern capitalist society. These historical events in England were described by scholars as being fueled by the historically inaccurate yet profoundly influential reference to Magna Carta (1215), which was heavily cited in the 17th century by rising elites such as Jurist Edward Coke and others to rally support against the British monarchy through the promotion of individualism. Early colonial charters, such as the Virginia Charter (1606) and the Massachusetts Body of Liberties (1641), as well as support for the American Revolution were influenced from this reference to Magna Carta. Many American colonists fought against Britain to preserve liberties and rights that they believed to be enshrined in Magna Carta. In the late 18th century, the United States Constitution became the supreme law of the land, recalling the manner in Magna Carta had come to be regarded as fundamental law.

As described by political scientist Kenneth Good, "the rewriting of history 'forged a new pedigree for the concept of democracy' traceable from Magna Carta, through the Glorious Revolution of 1688, and the Founding Fathers of the American constitution–all largely aristocratic and elitist events with an absent or passive people–taking precedence over [the alternative canon of] Athens, the Levellers and Diggers, and the Chartists and many others of the 1830s and 1840s." According to Good, "in this heritage, political rights in modern capitalist society no longer had the meaning and potency of citizenship in Athens. There was no clear division between state and civil society, no distinct and autonomous economy. With perhaps an especial contribution from American experience, modern capitalist democracy would be confined to a formally separate sphere while the market economy followed rules of its own, and socio-economic inequalities would coexist with civic freedom and formal political equality. Though new urban working classes struggled for self-determination through nineteenth-century Britain, democracy moved away from active citizenship to 'the passive enjoyment of constitutional rights and safeguards'; checks and balances, the division of powers, the rule of law." For Good, this idea of democracy was most identifiable through British and American liberalism.
