= Dorfmann =

Dorfmann is a German surname. Notable people with the surname include:

- Ania Dorfmann (1899–1984), Russian-American pianist and teacher
- Herbert Dorfmann (born 1969), Italian agronomist and politician
- Luis Dorfmann (born 1957), American professor
- Robert Dorfmann (1912–1999), French film producer

== See also ==
- Dorfman, surname
