= Joaquin Dorfman =

American writer

- Born: Joaquin Emiliano Dorfman; February 1979 (age 47); Amsterdam, Netherlands
- Occupations: Writer; performance artist
- Spouse: Cece Dynamite (m. 2019)
- Parent(s): Ariel Dorfman; Angélica Malinarich
- Relatives: Rodrigo Dorfman (brother)
- Writing career
- Pen name: Joaquin Dorfman; Joaquin Emiliano

Joaquin Emiliano Dorfman (born February 1979, in Amsterdam) is an American writer, performance artist, and boylesque performer (under the stage name Lucky Strike) based in New Orleans, Louisiana. He is of Argentinian, Chilean, and Jewish descent. He has written under the names Joaquin Dorfman and Joaquin Emiliano. He is the son of novelist, playwright, and human rights activist, Ariel Dorfman, and Angélica Malinarich. His older brother, Rodrigo, is a multimedia award-winning filmmaker and producer.

Dorfman also wrote, directed and starred in Dorm House 5, a dark comedy about the end of the world which was performed at the Edinburgh Festival.

Dorfman was born in Amsterdam, was raised in Durham, North Carolina, and currently resides in New Orleans, Louisiana with his wife, burlesque performer, Cece Dynamite (married January 19, 2019).

== Publications ==
Published by Penguin Random House under the name Joaquin Dorfman:

- The Burning City (2003) (written with his father, Ariel Dorfman)
- Playing It Cool (2006)
- The Long Wait for Tomorrow (2009)

Published independently under the name Joaquin Emiliano:

- Angry Jonny (2013)
- Suicide Notes from a Wedding (2014)
- Stories from a Bar with No Doorknobs (2016)
- Almost Lucky (2017)
- 75 Secrets (2018)
