= A Brief History of the Future =

2006 French-language book by Jacques Attali

A Brief History of the Future: A Brave and Controversial Look at the Twenty-First Century
- First French edition
- Author: Jacques Attali
- Original title: Une brève histoire de l'avenir
- Language: English
- Genre: Prospective history
- Published: 11 March 2009 (Arcade Publishing)
- Publication place: France
- ISBN: 1-55970-879-4
- OCLC: 181603360

A Brief History of the Future is a speculative futurology book about the next 50 years by Jacques Attali. The original edition was published by Fayard in 2006.

== Themes ==
=== History ===
The first third of the book retraces Human history from prehistory to today, with an emphasis on the rise of capitalism around 1200. It describes Dumézil's three Orders (religious, military and economic) as the "ritual order", the "imperial order" and the "merchant order", noting that the "merchant order" came to supersede the two others.

The book hypothesizes that "merchant order" went through nine successive geographical "cores" associated with a characteristic technology. The core cities were:

1. Bruges with the central rudder stock (1200–1350)
2. Venice with the caravel (1350–1500)
3. Antwerp with printing (1500–1560)
4. Genoa and accounting (1560–1620)
5. Amsterdam with the fluyt (1620–1788)
6. London and the steam engine (1788–1890)
7. Boston and the piston engine (1890–1929)
8. New York City with the electric engine (1929–1980)
9. Los Angeles and the microchip (1980–present)

A city would then become a "core" when it able to transform a service into an industrial product. The close vicinity becomes the "environment", and the rest of the world becomes the "periphery".

=== Speculation ===
==== Fall of the US empire ====
The speculation as to how the future will unfold begins one third into the book, which predicts the fall of the US Empire before the end of the ninth form of capitalism, estimated to take place around 2035.

It would be followed by a polycentric world, with nine dominating nations on all continents: the United States, Brazil, Mexico, China, India, Russia, the European Union, Egypt and Nigeria. Some of them, notably China, India and Nigeria, as well as other countries artificially created after colonization, could undertake an explosion process similar to that of USSR in 1991, with as many as 100 new countries emerging. Japan, Indonesia, Korea, Australia, Canada and South Africa would also play important roles as major regional powers.

A process of "nomadisation" would stem from technological factors, like the Internet; from demographic factors, like aging of developed populations which would entail massive immigration from Southern countries to pay retirements; and from development of megapoles.

Increase of world population would entail a doubling of global farming production. Urbanisation would make forest disappear everywhere, except for Europe and Northern America where artificially maintained ones would subsist. This would cause further increases of carbon dioxide in the atmosphere and accelerate global warming. Consecutive droughts would make water a rare resource, and greatly reduce biodiversity.

==== Hyperempire ====
The "nomadisation" process would make nation-States irrelevant, transforming the world into a chaotic market called "hyperempire". The entire planet would work according to an ultra-liberal economy and a form of democracy with "revisited" standards. The citizens would see themselves as "global citizens" who want their work to serve a "higher purpose".

The ruling class, called "hypernomads", would ground its power on a middle class of 4 billion "virtual nomads" comprising technicians, scientists, managers, engineers, etc. The "virtual nomads" would live a sedentary life, but work in networks for companies without a central location. 3.5 billion "infranomads" would subsist in misery.

"Infranomads" are expected to revolt violently against their condition, stemming a resurgence of national entities and crystallising conflicts around traditional borders of ethnicities, religions, etc. Technological improvements in weaponry would put Humanity at risk of destroying itself in this conflict.

==== Hyperdemocracy ====
Opportunities of more constructive developments are detailed under the term "Hyperdemocracy", based on solidarity networks, participative democracy, "responsible companies", NGOs, micro-credits and collective intelligence.

=== Present day ===
The end of the book details reforms defended by Attali for present France, as a partial remedy to her decline which threatens her ability to survive to the competition of the "hypermarket".

== Reception ==
A review in The Guardian complimented Attali's book but also said that "the author's prose is burdened by a habit of self-congratulation".
