= How to Read Donald Duck =

1971 book by Ariel Dorfman and Armand Mattelart

- Authors: Ariel Dorfman; Armand Mattelart
- Original title: Para leer al Pato Donald
- Translator: David Kunzle
- Language: Spanish
- Publication date: 1971
- Publication place: Chile
- English publication date: 1975
- Media type: Print

How to Read Donald Duck (Spanish: Para leer al Pato Donald) is a 1971 book-length essay by Ariel Dorfman and Armand Mattelart that critiques Disney comics from a Marxist point of view as capitalist propaganda for American corporate and cultural imperialism. It was first published in Chile in 1971, became a bestseller throughout Latin America and is still considered a seminal work in cultural studies. It was reissued in August 2018 to a general audience in the United States, with a new introduction by Dorfman, by OR Books.

== Summary ==
The book's thesis is that Disney comics are not only a reflection of the prevailing ideology at the time (capitalism), but that the comics' authors are also aware of this, and are active agents in spreading the ideology. To that end, Disney comics use images of the everyday world:

Here lies Disney's inventive (product of his era), rejecting the crude and explicit scheme of adventure strips, that came up at the same time. The ideological background is without any doubt the same: but Disney, not showing any open repressive force, is much more dangerous. The division between Bruce Wayne and Batman is the projection of fantasy outside the ordinary world to save it. Disney colonizes the everyday world, at hand of ordinary man and his common problems, with the analgesic of a child's imagination.

— Ariel Dorfman and Armand Mattelart, How to Read Donald Duck, p. 148

This closeness to everyday life is so only in appearance, because the world shown in the comics, according to the thesis, is based on ideological concepts, resulting in a set of natural rules that lead to the acceptance of particular ideas about capital, the developed countries' relationship with the Third World, gender roles, etc.

As an example, the book considers the lack of descendants of the characters. Everybody has an uncle or nephew, everybody is a cousin of someone, but nobody has fathers or sons. This non-parental reality creates horizontal levels in society, where there is no hierarchic order, except the one given by the amount of money and wealth possessed by each, and where there is almost no solidarity among those of the same level, creating a situation where the only thing left is crude competition. Another issue analyzed is the absolute necessity to have a stroke of luck for social mobility (regardless of the effort or intelligence involved), the lack of ability of the native tribes to manage their wealth, and others.

== Publication history ==
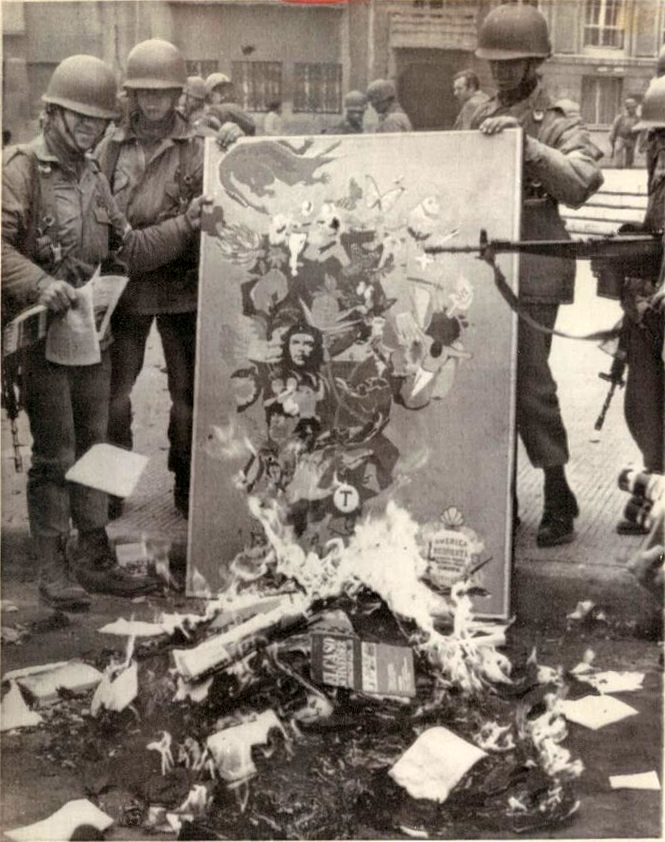
Soldiers burning books in Chile, 1973

How to Read Donald Duck was written and published by Ediciones Universitarias de Valparaíso, belonging to the Pontifical Catholic University of Valparaíso, during the brief flowering of democratic socialism under the government of Salvador Allende and his Popular Unity coalition and is closely identified with the revolutionary politics of its era. In 1973, a coup d'état, secretly supported by the United States, brought in power the military dictatorship of Augusto Pinochet. During Pinochet's regime, How to Read Donald Duck was banned and subject to book burning; its authors were forced into exile.

Outside Chile, How to Read Donald Duck became the most widely printed political text in Latin America for some time. It was translated into English, French, German, Portuguese, Dutch, Italian, Greek, Turkish, Swedish, Finnish, Danish, Japanese, and Korean and sold some 700,000 copies overall; by 1993, it had been reprinted 32 times by the publisher Siglo Veintiuno Editores.

A hardcover edition with a new introduction by Dorfman was published by OR Books in the United States in October 2018.

== Reception ==
Thomas Andrae, who has written about Carl Barks, has criticized the thesis of Dorfman and Mattelart. Andrae writes that it is not true that Disney controlled the work of every cartoonist, and that cartoonists had almost completely free hands unlike those who worked in animation. According to Andrae, Carl Barks did not even know that his cartoons were read outside the United States in the 1950s. Lastly, he writes that Barks' cartoons include social criticism and even anti-capitalist and anti-imperialist references.

David Kunzle, who translated the book into English, spoke to Carl Barks for his introduction and came to a similar conclusion. He believes Barks projected his own experience as an underpaid cartoonist onto Donald Duck, and views some of his stories as satires "in which the imperialist Duckburgers come off looking as foolish as—and far meaner than—the innocent Third World natives".

== See also ==
- Seduction of the Innocent

== Sources ==
- Andrae, Thomas (2006), "Rereading Donald Duck", Carl Barks and the Disney Comic Book: Unmasking the Myth of Modernity, University Press of Mississippi, ISBN 978-1578068586
- Constantinou, Costas M. (2008), "Communications/excommunications: an interview with Armand Matellart", in Constantinou, Costas M.; Richmond, Oliver P.; Watson, Alison M.S. (eds.), Cultures and Politics of Global Communication: Volume 34, Review of International Studies, Cambridge University Press, ISBN 978-0521727112
- McClennen, Sophia A. (2010), Ariel Dorfman:An Aesthetics of Hope, Duke University Press, ISBN 978-0-8223-9195-1
- Mendoza, Plinio Apuleyo; Montaner, Carlos Alberto; Llosa, Alvaro Vargas (2000), "How to Read Donald Duck: Ariel Dorfman and Armand Matellart, 1972", Guide to the Perfect Latin American Idiot, Madison Books, ISBN 978-1-4616-6278-5
- Mirrlees, Tanner (2013), "Paradigms of Global Entertainment Media", Global Entertainment Media: Between Cultural Imperialism and Cultural Globalization, Routledge, ISBN 978-1136334658
- Mooney, Jadwiga E. Pieper (2009), "Roasting the Duck:National Hegemony and Revolutionary Culture", The Politics of Motherhood: Maternity and women's rights in twentieth-century Chile, University of Pittsburgh Press, ISBN 978-0822973614
- Smoodin, Eric (1994), "Introduction: How to Read Walt Disney", in Smoodin, Eric (ed.), Disney Discourse: Producing the Magic Kingdom, Routledge, ISBN 978-1135216597
- Tomlinson, John (1991), "Reading Donald Duck: the ideology-critique of 'the imperialist text'", Cultural Imperialism: A Critical Introduction, Continuum International Publishing Group, ISBN 978-0826450135
