= Jacques de Lacretelle =

French novelist

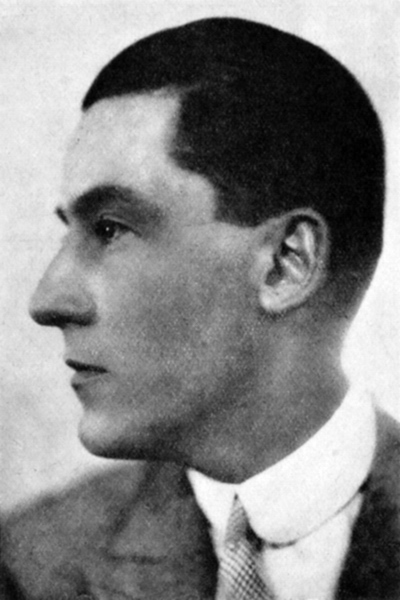
- Jacques de Lacretelle, sometime before 1934
- Born: Amaury Gaston Jacques de Lacretelle; 14 July 1888; Cormatin, French Third Republic
- Died: 2 January 1985 (aged 96); Paris, French Fifth Republic
- Education: Cours Hattemer; Lycée Janson-de-Sailly
- Alma mater: University of Cambridge
- Spouse: Yolande Jacobé de Naurois
- Children: Anne de Lacretelle
- Writing career
- Language: French
- Period: 20th century
- Notable work: Silbermann
- Notable awards: Legion of Honour; Ordre des Arts et des Lettres
- Literary movement: Positivism; Realism
- Organization: Croix-de-Feu
- Political party: French Social Party
- Movement: Proto-fascism

Jacques de Lacretelle (14 July 1888 in Cormatin, Saône-et-Loire – 2 January 1985) was a French novelist. He was elected to the Académie Française (Note: This is the anglicized version of the name, with a capital "F". In French, it is generally written with a lowercase "f".) on 12 November 1936.

== Bibliography ==
- 1920 La vie inquiète de Jean Hermelin (Grasset)
- 1922 Silbermann (novel) (Gallimard)
- 1925 La Bonifas (Gallimard)
- 1925 Mélanges sur l'amour et les livres, terminés par un envoi (Gallimard)
- 1926 Trébuchet. Mort de la jalousie (La Lampe d'Aladin)
- 1926 Lettres espagnoles (Gallimard)
- 1926 Quatre études sur Gobineau (La Lampe d'Aladin)
- 1927 Aparté. Colère. Journal de colère. Dix jours à Ermenonville (Gallimard)
- 1927 Aperçus (Marcelle Lesage)
- 1927 Rêveries romantiques. Dix jours à Ermenonville. Le rêveur parisien (Stendhal)
- 1927 Virginie, ou les manies (Champion (Édouard))
- 1928 D'une colline. Quatre jours à Bayreuth (Les Cahiers Libres)
- 1928 L'âme cachée, nouvelles (Gallimard)
- 1928 Quatre nouvelles italiennes (Lemarget)
- 1928 Album napolitain (Hazan)
- 1928 Études (Librairie Picard)
- 1929 Histoire de Paola Ferrari (Flammarion)
- 1929 Le retour de Silbermann (Gallimard)
- 1930 Amour nuptial (Gallimard) – Grand Prix du roman de l'Académie française
- 1930 À la rencontre de France (Trémois)
- 1930 Le demi-dieu ou le voyage en Grèce (Grasset)
- 1930 Pressentiments (Les Quatre Chemins)
- 1931 Luce, ou l'enfance d'une courtisane (Trémois)
- 1932 Les Hauts Ponts. I. Sabine (Gallimard)
- 1933 Les Hauts Ponts. II. Les fiançailles (Gallimard)
- 1934 Les aveux étudiés (Gallimard)
- 1935 Les Hauts Ponts. III. Années d'espérance (Gallimard)
- 1935 Les Hauts Ponts. IV. La monnaie de plomb (Gallimard)
- 1936 L'écrivain public (Gallimard)
- 1936 Qui est La Roque ? (Flammarion)
- 1938 Morceaux choisis (Gallimard)
- 1939 Croisières en eaux troubles, carnets de voyage (Gallimard)
- 1940 Le Canada entre en guerre. Choses vues (Flammarion)
- 1941 L'Heure qui chante (Le Milieu du monde)
- 1945 Libérations (Brentano's)
- 1946 Idées dans un chapeau (Le Rocher)
- 1946 Le Pour et le Contre (Le Milieu du monde)
- 1953 Une visite en été, pièce en quatre actes (Gallimard)
- 1953 Deux cœurs simples (Gallimard)
- 1958 Paris. Présentation de Jacques de Lacretelle. Photos de Jacques Boulas (Hachette)
- 1959 Les Maîtres et les Amis. Études et souvenirs littéraires (Wesmael-Charlier)
- 1959 Le tiroir secret (Wesmael-Charlier)
- 1963 La galerie des amants, Anthologie de lettres d'amour (I) (Librairie académique Perrin)
- 1964 L'amour sur la place, Anthologie de lettres d'amour (II) (Librairie académique Perrin)
- 1964 Portraits d'hier et figures d'aujourd'hui (Librairie académique Perrin)
- 1974 Journal de bord (Grasset)
- 1977 Les vivants et leur ombre (Grasset)
- 1981 Quand le destin nous mène (Grasset)
