= Boris Dorfman =

Ukrainian writer and activist (1923–2022)

- Борис Менделевич Дорфман
- Born: Boruch Mendelevich Dorfman; 23 May 1923; Cahul, Bessarabia, Romania
- Died: 23 March 2022 (aged 98); Lviv, Ukraine
- Resting place: Yaniv Cemetery, Lviv
- Citizenship: Romania; Soviet Union; Ukraine
- Occupations: Publicist; writer; engineer; activist
- Children: Michael Dorfman

Boris (Boruch) Mendelevich Dorfman (Ukrainian: Борис (Борух) Менделевич Дорфман, Yiddish: באָריס (ברוך) דאָרפמאַן; 23 May 1923 – 23 March 2022) was a Ukrainian Jewish publicist, writer, scholar of Jewish culture, and civic activist based in Lviv.

== Biography ==
Boruch Dorfman was born on 23 May 1923 in Cahul, Bessarabia (then part of the Kingdom of Romania, now in Moldova), into the merchant family of Mendel and Molka Dorfman; his maternal grandfather served as a rabbi in Kiliia.

On 7 July 1940, shortly after the Soviet occupation of Bessarabia and Northern Bukovina, the Dorfman family was arrested on charges of "anti-Soviet Zionism," had their property confiscated, and was deported. His father died in 1942. During World War II, Dorfman served in the Red Army and spent a brief period in German captivity.

In 1949, Dorfman relocated to Lviv to join relatives; that same year, his mother was arrested again for Zionist activity and sentenced to seven years' imprisonment. In Lviv, Dorfman worked as chief engineer of the Stalin District Housing Administration—overseeing buildings in the Market Square and Virmenska Street area—and later spent 35 years in leadership roles in capital construction and technical supervision for the regional pharmacy administration.

Dorfman family gravestone at Yaniv Cemetery in Lviv

During the late Soviet era and after Ukrainian independence, Dorfman became a leading figure in the revival of Jewish cultural life in Lviv. He was one of the founders and board members of the Sholem Aleichem Society of Jewish Culture in Lviv and, together with his wife, established and taught at a Jewish Sunday school. In March 1990, he co-founded and served as an editor of Shofar, the first Jewish newspaper in the former Soviet Union.

Dorfman authored roughly 1,000 articles on Jewish history, literature, and culture in Yiddish, Russian, Ukrainian, Polish, and German for periodicals including Birobidzhaner Shtern and Sovetish Heymland. He was also widely known in Lviv for leading educational walking tours on local Jewish heritage.

Dorfman died on 23 March 2022 in Lviv at the age of 98, and was buried in Section 4 of the Jewish sector at Yaniv Cemetery. His son, Michael Dorfman, is a writer and human rights activist.

== Selected articles ==
- Dorfman, Boris. "Элиезер Штеинбарг, Яков Штеренберг и Моше Альтман — писатели, творцы духовного наследия на идиш в ХХ в" [Eliezer Shteinbarg, Jacob Sternberg and Moshe Altman – writers, creators of Yiddish spiritual heritage in the twentieth century] (in Russian). Institute of Jewish Studies. Archived from the original on 29 December 2002.
- Dorfman, Boris. "ИЦИК МАНГЕР И ПАУЛЬ ЦЕЛАН — ДВА ВЕЛИКИХ ПОЭТА ХХ СТОЛЕТИЯ" [Itzik Manger and Paul Celan – Two great poets of the twentieth century] (in Russian). Institute of Jewish Studies. Archived from the original on 9 February 2008.
- Dorfman, Boris (28 August 2003). "Моисей Гершензон /1903– 1943/. ФЕНОМЕН ЕВРЕЙСКОГО КУЛЬТУРНОГО ВОЗРОЖДЕНИЯ НА УКРАИНЕ 20– 30-х годов" [Moses Gershenzon / 1903–1943 / Phenomenon of Jewish Cultural Renaissance in 1920s–30s Ukraine]. Proceedings of Sixth Conference (in Russian). Institute of Jewish Studies. Archived from the original on 18 February 2008.
- "Земляки" [Compatriots]. Еврейское местечко (in Russian). Chişinău. December 2008.
