= Michael Vavrus =

- Born: Moline, Illinois
- Occupations: Author, University Professor
- Writing career
- Subjects: Multicultural education, Critical theory, Political economy, Teacher education
- Website: Website

Michael Vavrus is a faculty member at The Evergreen State College in Olympia, Washington in the areas of teacher education and political economy. He is the past president of the Washington Association of Colleges for Teacher Education and the Association of Independent Liberal Arts Colleges for Teacher Education. He is also the past director of the Masters in Teaching Program at The Evergreen State College, and the founding past president of CommonAction.

Vavrus is the author of Transforming the Multicultural Education of Teachers: Theory, Research, and Practice., which was published by Teachers College Press in 2002.

== Publications ==
- (Forthcoming) "Sexuality, schooling, and teacher identity formation: A critical pedagogy for teacher education," Teaching and Teacher Education.
- (2002) Transforming the Multicultural Education of Teachers: Theory, Research, and Practice. Teachers College Press.
- (2001) "Deconstructing the Multicultural Animus Held by Monoculturalists," Journal of Teacher Education 52(1). pp. 70–77.
- (1999) "Weaving the Web of Democracy: Confronting Conflicting Expectations for Teachers and Schools," with Walton, S., Kido, J., Diffendal, E., King, P. Journal of Teacher Education. 50.
- (1997) "Multicultural Content Infusion by Student Teachers" with Ozcan, M. in Dilworth, M. (ed) Being Responsive to Cultural Differences: How Teachers Learn. Corwin Press.
- (1994) "A critical analysis of multicultural education infusion during student teaching," Action in Teacher Education. XVI. pp. 46–57.
- (1993) Proceedings from A Critical Social Perspective on Serving Today's Children and Youth: The Experience of a Consortium of Liberal Arts Colleges. A Symposium Presented at the Annual Meeting of the American Association of Colleges for Teacher Education (San Diego, California, February 24–27, 1993). ERIC ED356194.
- (1989) "Alienation as the Conceptual Foundation for Incorporating Teacher Empowerment into the Teacher Education Knowledge Base" in Carbone, M. (ed) Proceedings of the National Forum of the Association of Independent Liberal Arts Colleges for Teacher Education (3rd, Indianapolis, Indiana, June 2–4, 1989).
