= Bernard Attali =

French official and business executive (born 1943)

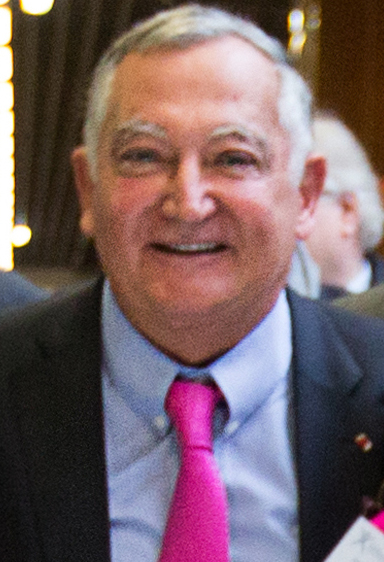
- Bernard Attali in 2015
- Born: 1 November 1943 (age 82); Algiers, French Algeria
- Education: Sciences Po; École nationale d'administration
- Occupation: Business executive
- Relatives: Jacques Attali (twin brother)

Bernard Attali (born 1943) is a French business executive, political advisor and one-time novelist. He was the chief executive officer (CEO) of Air France from 1988 to 1993. He is a senior advisor to TPG Capital and Bank of America Merrill Lynch.

== Early life ==
Bernard Attali was born on 1 November 1943 in Algiers, French Algeria (now Algeria). His twin brother, Jacques Attali, is an economist and political advisor. He also has a sister, Fabienne. Their parents were Jewish. Their father, Simon Attali, was trained as a rabbi and made a fortune in the fragrance industry. The family moved to Mainland France, settling in the 16th arrondissement of Paris in 1956, two years into the Algerian War.

Attali took piano lessons from the age of five. He graduated from Sciences Po in 1966 and the École nationale d'administration (ENA) in 1968.

== Career ==
Attali became an advisor to the Court of Audit in 1974; he was promoted to the rank of master advisor in 1991.

Attali served as the financial director of the Club Med from 1980 to 1981. He then served as the head of DATAR from 1981 to 1984. He served as the president of the Groupe des Assurances Nationales (GAN) from 1984 to 1986.

Attali was the CEO of Air France from 1988 to 1993. He oversaw the acquisition of Union de Transports Aériens in 1989 and Union de Transports Aériens in 1992.

Attali subsequently worked for Arjil & Associés Banque, an investment bank, from 1993 to 1996. He was CEO of Bankers Trust France, the French subsidiary of Bankers Trust, from 1996 to 1998. He was the vice-chairman of Deutsche Bank Europe Investment Banking from 1999 to 2000. In 2007, Attali joined TPG Capital as a senior advisor. He is also a senior advisor to Bank of America Merrill Lynch, and a director of SFR.

Attali is the author of two non-fiction books and a novel, La mise en examen. In 2015, he authored a report about the future of the École Polytechnique for the French government.

Attali became an Officer of the Legion of Honour in July 1998.

== Works ==
- Attali, Bernard (1994). Les guerres du ciel : cinq ans aux commandes d'Air France. Paris: Fayard. ISBN 9782213592497. OCLC 416243469.
- Attali, Bernard (2012). La mise en examen. Paris: Grasset. ISBN 9782246799894. OCLC 793946425.
- Attali, Bernard (2014). Si nous voulions. Paris: Flammarion. ISBN 9782081341784. OCLC 881826329.
