= Yves Stourdzé =

French sociologist

Yves Stourdzé (1947 – December 1986) was a French sociologist. He studied technical and institutional conditions for innovation and how acceptable the effects of these are on society. He has also produced one of the most pertinent analyses of the phenomenon of informatization.

Yves Sourdzé worked at CESTA (Centre d'Études des Systèmes et Technologies Avancées) from 1979 to 1987 and founded the European research project EUREKA. In 1985, he organised in Paris the first international colloquium on the cognitive sciences: "Cognitiva 85 : de l’intelligence artificielle aux biosciences".

== Articles ==
- "Autopsie d'une machine à laver", Culture Technique, September 1980.

== Legacy ==
An amphitheatre at the ministry of research (ex-Ecole polytechnique, rue Descartes à Paris V°) bears his name.

== Works ==
- Organisation, anti-organisation, Mame, 1973, ISBN 2-250-00550-8.
- Les ruines du futur, Utopies, 1979.
- Recherche image, with H. False, Documentation Française, 1981.
- Technologie, culture et communication, with A. Mattelard, Documentation Française, 1982, ISBN 2-11-001017-7.
- Images, visualisation et informatique, with Richard Clavaud et Jean-Paul Gillet, CESTA, 1984, ISBN 2-904760-20-2.
- Pour une poignée d'électrons, Fayard, 1987, ISBN 2-213-02026-4.
