= Armand Mattelart =

Belgian sociologist (1936–2025)

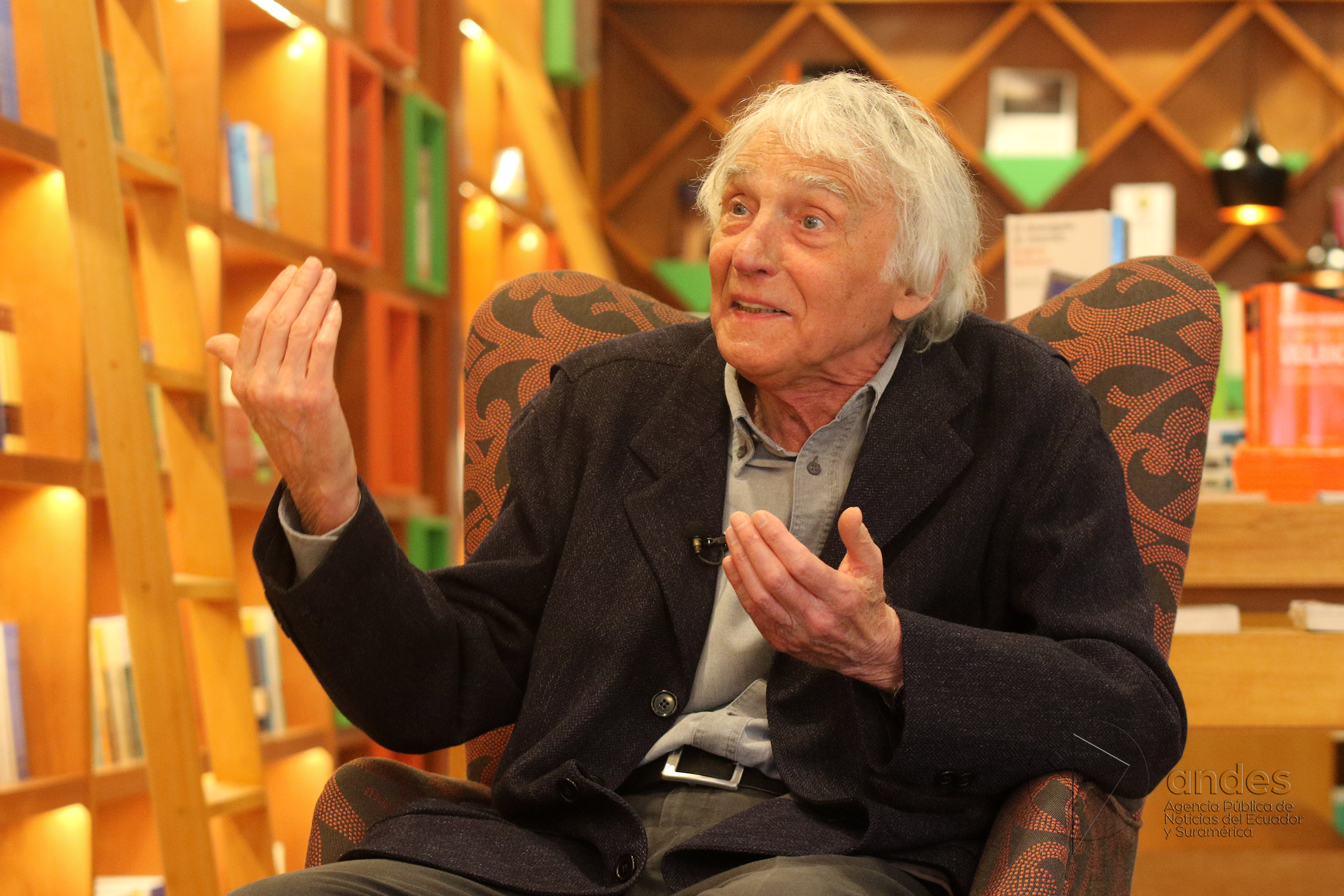
Mattelart, receiving an honorary doctorate from the University of Valladolid, 2016

Armand Mattelart (French: [matlaʁ]; 8 January 1936 – 31 October 2025) was a Belgian sociologist, known as a leftist French scholar. His work deals with media, culture and communication, specially in their historical and international dimensions.

== Life and career ==
After finishing his undergraduate studies Mattelart joined a community of secular monks in Brittany for one year, but went on to study Law and Political Science at the Catholic University of Louvain. Afterwards he studied demography at the Institute of Demographic Studies in Paris (founded by the left intellectual Alfred Sauvy, who in 1952 coined the term Third World). Upon finishing his studies he was appointed as an expert on the politics of population by the Vatican, and in 1962 was sent to the Universidad Católica de Chile. While in Chile he married Michèle Mattelart.

While in Chile Mattelart was appointed to confront from a Catholic perspective the models for family planning being pushed by the Ford and Rockefeller Foundations and the Alianza para el Progreso (Alliance for Progress—a US official aid program). The US family planning model aimed to limit the natality to "improve the lives of the inhabitants of the continent" and of course in conflict with the Catholic teachings. The revolutionary transformations in Latin America post-1960 required that the Church enter the ideological fray and develop communication strategies applied to "ideological, political and social struggles" to create ideological and political alternatives to atheist communism or the "protestant North American imperialism".

While based at the Universidad Católica, Mattelart underwent a transformation in his thoughts and beliefs. He initiated a collaboration with the Centro de Estudios de la Realidad Nacional (CEREN) (Center for the Study of the National Reality), founded in 1968 under the auspices of the Catholic Univ. Jacques Chonchol was CEREN's director (also an important ideolog with MAPU—a left offshoot of the Christian Democrats which was also part of the Unidad Popular government). CEREN's first research conducted by Armando Mattelart, Michèle Mattelart, Mabel Paccini, et al., had to do with a structural left analysis of the liberal press, the "celebrity" publications, the pseudo-amorous magazines. Mattelart primarily studied El Mercurio, the principal liberal newspaper. This was the starting-point of his lifelong involvement with the history of communications.

The Cuadernos de la Realidad Nacional (Notebooks of the National Reality), CEREN's publication, became the principal ideological generators and emitters during the social democratic government of Salvador Allende (1970–1973). The journal was similar to the French post-structuralist model, and it was primarily aimed to analyze the political economy of the mass media. Under this rubric, Mattelart and Ariel Dorfman published in 1971 the famous pamphlet: Para leer al Pato Donald, manual de descolonización antinorteamericana (How to read "Donald Duck", a manual for American de-colonization), where they provided a Marxist structural analysis of global forms of American consumer capitalism. The pamphlet denounces "Yankee media penetration" through an assessment of Disney as global ideological conveyor of American liberal - and increasingly neoliberal - values. The book analyzed the celebrated family of ducks and how the comics reflected North American cultural imperialism. This book enjoyed great publicity and it became one of the best-selling books in Latin America during the 1970s, largely because of American-centered interventions in Latin America and repeated efforts by American political, economic, and paramilitary assets to undermine the democratically elected government in Chile.

After the Chilean coup of 1973, Mattelart returned to France where (at age 37) he had to restart his academic career—he became a visiting scholar at the University of Paris VIII Saint-Denis. He later became a full professor of Science of Information and Communication—a topic on which he later became a theoretician. In 1974, he worked on La Espiral, a film justifying the Chilean route to socialism. Between 1983 and 1997 he has been Professor of Information and Communication Sciences at the University of Rennes 2 – Upper Brittany, and in the postgraduate program at Paris III (Nouvelle Sorbonne) -Rennes 2. From 1997 to 2004, he was a professor at the Université of Paris VIII.

Mattelart died on 31 October 2025, at the age of 89.

== Books translated into English ==
- How to Read Donald Duck: Imperialist Ideology in the Disney Comic. (with Ariel Dorfman, translation by David Kunzle) ISBN 0-88477-023-0 (International general Editions, 1975)
- How to Read Donald Duck: Imperialist Ideology in the Disney Comic. (with Ariel Dorfman, translation by David Kunzle) ISBN 978-1944869830 (OR Books, 2018)
- Communication and Class Struggle. An Anthology in two volumes (with Seth Siegelaub, International general Editions, 1979 and 1983)*
- Multinational Corporations and the control of Culture, (Harvester Press, 1979)
- Mass Media, Ideologies and the Revolutionary Movement, (Harvester Press, 1980)
- Transnationals and the Third World: The Struggle for Culture, (Bergin and Garvey, 1983)
- International Image Markets. In Search of an Alternative, (with Michèle Mattelart and Xavier Delcourt, Comedia, 1984)
- Communication and Information Technologies: Freedom of Choice for Latin America?, (with Hector Schmucler, Ablex, 1985)
- Technology, Culture and Communication: A Report to the French Ministry of Research and Industry, (with Yves Stourdzé, Elsevier, 1985)
- (Editor) Communicating in Popular Nicaragua. An Anthology, (International general Editions, 1986)
- The Carnaval of Images: Brazilian Television Fiction, (with Michèle Mattelart, Greenwood, 1990)
- Advertising International: The Privatization of Public Space (Routledge, 1991)
- Rethinking Media Theories: Signposts and New Direction, (with Michèle Mattelart] University of Minnesota Press, 1992)
- Mapping World Communication: War, Progress, Culture (University of Minnesota Press, 1994)
- The Invention of Communication, (University of Minnesota Press, 1996)
- Theories of Communication. An Introduction, (with Michèle Mattelart, SAGE Publications, 1998)
- Networking the World 1794-2000 (University of Minnesota Press, 2000)
- The Information Society: An Introduction (SAGE Publications, 2003)
- The Globalisation of Surveillance (Polity Press, 2010)
