= Rodrigo Dorfman =

Latino Visual Storyteller

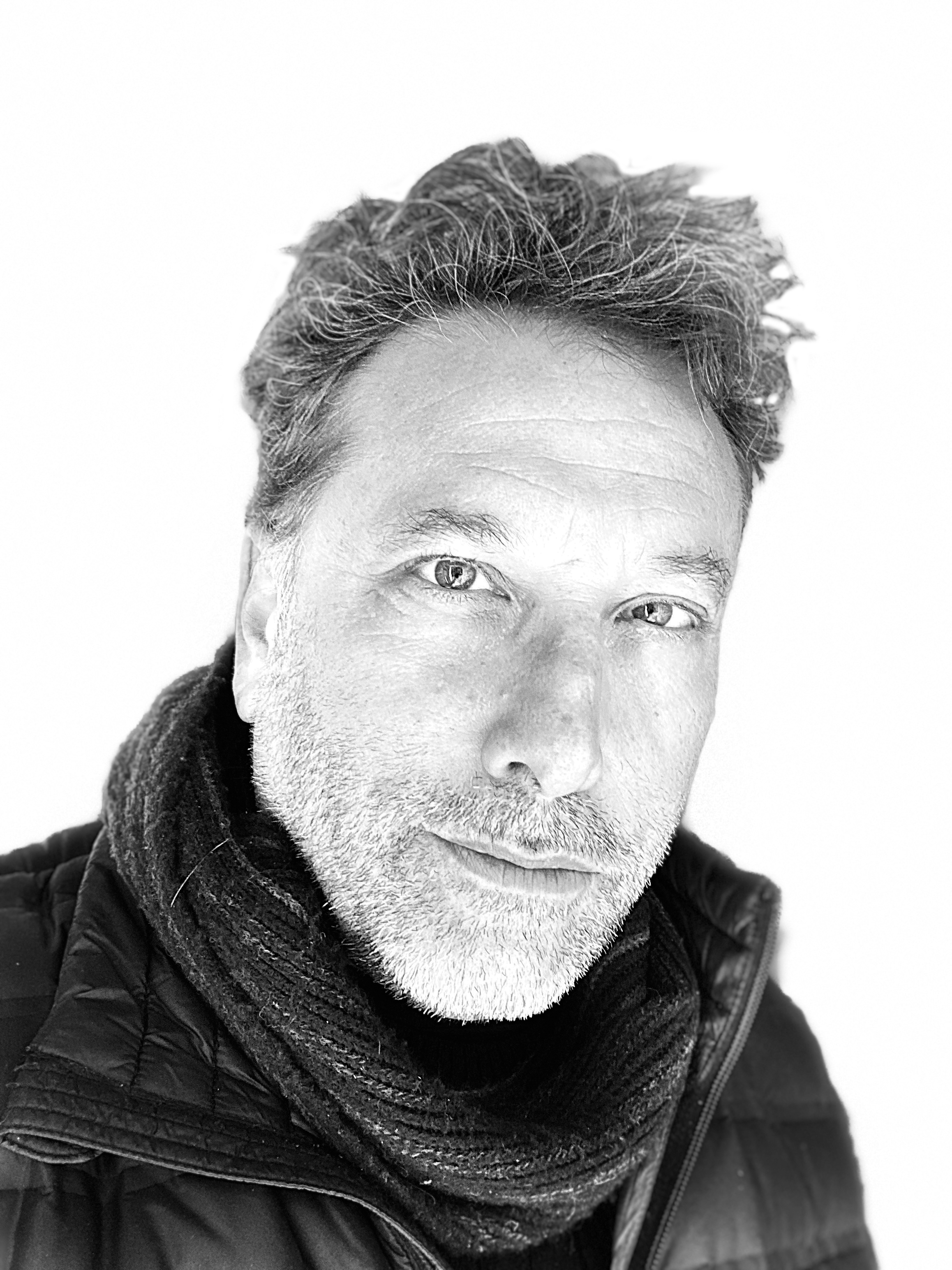
- Born: February 11, 1967 (age 59); Santiago, Chile
- Notable work: This Taco Truck Kills Fascists, Generation Exile, Fiesta Quinceañera
- Awards: Best Screenplay Award, 1997, Writer's Guild of Great Britain
- Website: www.rodrigodorfman.com

Rodrigo Dorfman (born 1967 in Santiago, Chile) is a film director, producer, cinematographer, multimedia artist, film critic and commentator living in Durham, North Carolina. He has worked with P.O.V., HBO, Salma Hayek's Ventanazul and the BBC among others.

== Early life ==
Dorfman was born February 11, 1967, in Santiago, Chile to Angélica Malinarich and writer Ariel Dorfman, who was a cultural advisor to president Salvador Allende. While in exile after the 1973 Chilean coup d'état, he lived in Paris, Amsterdam in the Netherlands and moved with his family to the United States in 1980. He continues to live and work in Durham, North Carolina where his father works as a professor at Duke University since 1985.

== Career ==
Rodrigo Dorfman also has worked locally in North Carolina creating short documentaries with NC Arts Council (Heritage Awards), the Wake County Magnet Schools, Duke University, North Carolina Humanities Council, Duke Music Dept., El Futuro, National Farm Worker Ministry and NC Field.

In 1997, Dorfman worked with his father on Prisoners of Time, for which he won a Writer's Guild of Great Britain Award. That was followed in 1998, with Deadline, a movie for Channel 4, England, shown as part of the 50th-anniversary celebration of the Universal Declaration of Human Rights. Konfidenz, a radio play for the BBC, which he co-wrote with his father, was aired in England in Spring 2001. In 1998, he also collaborated with his father on his first short film "My House is in Fire" about two undocumented children trapped in safe house, somewhere in the American South. The short went on to screen at Edinburg Film Festival, Telluride Film Festival, Toronto International Film Festival, among other.

He also co-wrote Shaheed, for the BBC, a teleplay on suicide bombers, Los Angeles Open City, a pilot for HBO on Latinos in Los Angeles, and Blake's Therapy for Salma Hayek's company Ventanazul.

Dorfman has been documenting the Latino community in North Carolina through a series of hybrid educational/neo-realist films, Angelica's Dreams and Roberto's Dreams, and VIVA LA COOPERATIVA, a feature documentary on the history of the first Latino Credit Union in the US. Angelica's Dreams (2008), won a Dora Maxwell Award for Social Responsibility. His documentary work formed the basis of the national traveling exhibit "NUEVOlution! Latinos and the New South" exhibited at the Levine Museum of the New South, the Birmingham Civil Rights Institute and the Atlanta History Center. He received a MUSE Award in Media and Technology from the AMA for his work on the Nuevolution! exhibit at the Levine Museum of the New South. Rodrigo was the community curator of Nuevo Espiritú de Durham, an exhibit of the Durham History Museum on the history of Latinos in Durham.

Rodrigo's first feature documentary Generation Exile (2010) premiered at Full Frame Documentary Film Festival in 2010 and then went on to screen at the Santiago International Film Festival (SANFIC) 6. It was awarded the LASA (Latin America Studies Association) Merit Award in Film in 2011. Rodrigo won the Full Frame Jury Award for the Best Short in 2011 for his jazz documentary, One Night in Kernersville. 'Tommy! The Dreams I Keep Inside Me', his 30-minute documentary on a 60-year-old man on the autism spectrum who dreams of singing with a big band was recently broadcast nationwide through UNCTV's Southern Reel series. The first in part of his Resistance Trilogy documentaries, Occupy the Imagination: Tales of Resistance and Seduction premiered at SANFIC (2013) where it received Special Jury Mention. He worked as an editor and cinematographer on the Sundance documentary Always in Season about the impact of lynching on three different communities.

His collaboration with Jazz musician and band leader John Brown led to the short One Night in Kernersville, which won the Full Frame Jury Award in 2011 and the Best Cinematography Award at the Charlotte Film Festival. He spent three years working and documenting the creation of the Durham Civil Rights Mural, the first publicly funded public art work by the City of Durham. From the process, a 30-minute short, Living Colors was created and played at the local Hayti Film Festival. Rodrigo also worked with Brenda Miller-Holmes and a dozen community muralists who worked on the project and created a community-centered exhibit called MURALIST!. During the creation of the Mural, Rodrigo Dorfman also worked on Mayor Bill Bell's Anti Poverty Campaign by creating a video to educate employers on the Second Chance program, facilitating the hiring of formerly incarcerated folk. He worked with SpiritHouse creating short fundraiser videos for their Harm Free Zone campaign. Rodrigo was commissioned to collaborate with Nia Wilson (SpiritHouse) on an essay/dialogue The Sweetness and the Spoil, Durham stories of Resistance. The essay featured Rodrigo's short film Mother to Mother: Collective Son, created in collaboration with a SpiritHouse and SONG. Rodrigo was then commissioned to create a documentary about SpiritHouse by Alternate Roots, the result was Reshaping the Mo(u)rning a powerful collaboration centered on the staging of the play Collective Sun: Reshape the Mo(u)rning.

In 2017, he directed ''And the Children Will Burn'' (2017), a short film written by his father featured in the opinion pages of the New York Times.

In 2018, This Taco Truck Kills Fascists, a documentary on a Revolutionary Taco Truck Theatre in New Orleans was awarded the Best Louisiana Feature Award at the New Orleans Film Festival. FIESTA!Quinceañera, a digital series on quinceañeras for ITVS and PBS Digital Studios that he co-directed with Peter Eversoll recently premiered on the StoryCast YouTube Channel. With creative producer Peter Eversoll, they adapted the series to a feature documentary which was broadcast nationwide on PBS on Season 4 of REEL SOUTH.

As a multimedia producer he has created a series of online documentaries: Gnawa Stories; Kid Gloves for handling abducted children; American Shadows for POV.

Rodrigo has contributed to Andre Codrescu's online journal Exquisite Corpse and the Durham Herald-Sun's bilingual page "Nuestro Pueblo"; he was the Triangle's Spectator Magazine's film critic (2000–01) and a commentator for WUNC radio. His photographs have been published in the Style Section of The Washington Post and Global Rhythm magazine.

== Films ==
Director/Producer

- 1997 – My House is on Fire (18:00)
- 2004 – Missing Heather (15:00)
- 2005 – Security – Exile – Identity: Three shorts of POV
- 2006 – Weaving Dreams: An immigrant Woman's Collective (13:00)
- 2007 – Angelica's Dreams (59:30)
- 2008 – CartWheels: Art on the Move (15:00)
- 2008 – Voices Together (12:00)
- 2008 – Back to Deoband: The Jihad of Ebrahim Moosa (15:00)
- 2010 – Roberto's Dreams (61:00)
- 2010 – !VIVA LA COOPERATIVA! (60:00)
- 2011 – Generation Exile (70:00)
- 2011 - One Night in Kernersville (20:00)
- 2012 - Monsieur Contraste (60:00)
- 2013 - Occupy the Imagination (90:00)
- 2014 - Tommy! The Dreams I Keep Inside Me (30:00)
- 2017 - And the Children Will Burn (13.40)
- 2018 - This Taco Truck Kills Fascists (61:00)
- 2018 - FIESTA!Quinceañera (55:00)
- 2020 - Quaranteened (55:0)

Associate Producer

- 2007 – A Promise to the Dead (90:00)

Screenwriter

- 1996 – Prisoners in Time (BBC)
- 1998 – Deadline (Channel 4, England)
- 2000 – Los Angeles Open City (HBO)
- 2006 – Shaheed (BBC)
- 2008 – Blake's Therapy (Salma Hayek/Ventanazul)

=== Awards and distinctions ===
- Best Screenplay Award – Writer's Guild of Great Britain (1995)
- Roy H. Park Fellowship – UNC School of Journalism (2001-2003)
- Dora Maxwell Award for Social Responsibility – for Angelica's Dreams (2008)
- LASA (Latin America Studies Association) Merit Award in Film for Generation Exile
- Full Frame Best Short Jury Award for One Night in Kernersville (2011)
- Best Cinematography Award, Charlotte Film Festival for One Night in Kernersville (2012)
- Special Jury Mention SANFIC 9 – Santiago International Film Festival (2013) for Occupy the Imagination (2013)
- MUSE Award in Media and Technology from the AMA for his work on Nuevolution! Exhibit at the Levine Museum of the New South
- Diamante Award for Arts and Media (2018)
- NC Artist Fellowship Award (2018)
- Best Louisiana Feature for This Taco Truck Kills Fascists from the New Orleans Film Festival.
