= Ariel Dorfman =

Argentine-Chilean writer and human rights activist (born 1942)

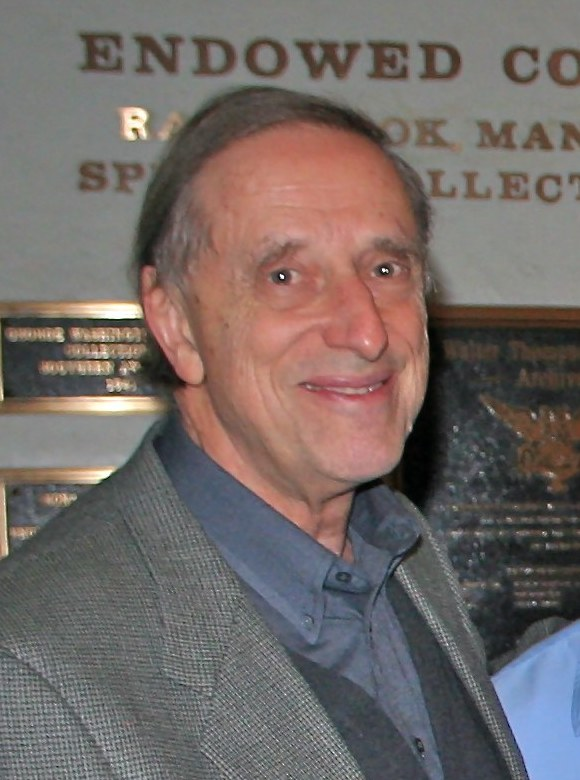
- Dorfman in 2009
- Born: Vladimiro Ariel Dorfman; May 6, 1942 (age 84); Buenos Aires, Argentina
- Occupations: Novelist, playwright, essayist, academic and human rights activist
- Years active: 1968–present
- Spouse: Angélica Malinarich (m. 1966)
- Children: 2, including Rodrigo Dorfman
- Website: arieldorfman.com

Vladimiro Ariel Dorfman (born May 6, 1942) is an Argentine and American novelist, playwright, essayist, academic and human rights activist. A citizen of the United States since 2004, he has been a professor of literature and Latin American studies at Duke University, in Durham, North Carolina, since 1985.

== Background and education ==
Dorfman was born in Buenos Aires, Argentina, on May 6, 1942, the son of Adolf Dorfman, who was born in Odessa (then Russian Empire) to a well-to-do Jewish family and became a prominent Argentine professor of economics and the author of Historia de la Industria Argentina, and Fanny Zelicovich Dorfman, who was born in Kishinev of Bessarabian Jewish descent.

Shortly after his birth, they moved to the United States, where he spent his first ten years of childhood in New York until his family was forced to relocate due to "the anti-communist frenzy". His family eventually settled in Chile in 1954. He attended, and later worked as a professor at, the University of Chile, marrying Angélica Malinarich in 1966 and becoming a Chilean citizen in 1967. From 1968 to 1969, he attended graduate school at the University of California, Berkeley and then returned to Chile.

Since the restoration of democracy in Chile in 1990, he and his wife Angélica have divided their time between Santiago and the United States.

== Career ==
From 1970 to 1973, Dorfman served as a cultural adviser to President Salvador Allende. During this time he wrote, with Armand Mattelart, a critique of American cultural imperialism, How to Read Donald Duck. Dorfman went on to live in Paris, Amsterdam and Washington, D.C. Since 1985, he has taught at Duke University, where he is currently Walter Hines Page Research Professor of Literature and Professor of Latin American studies.

Dorfman details his life of exile and bicultural living in his memoir, Heading South, Looking North, which has been acclaimed by Elie Wiesel, Nadine Gordimer, Thomas Keneally and others.

In 2020, he wrote in the Los Angeles Times: "Fifty years ago today, on the night of Sept. 4, 1970, I was dancing, along with a multitude of others, in the streets of Santiago de Chile. We were celebrating the election of Salvador Allende, the first democratically elected socialist leader in the world. President Allende’s victory had historical significance beyond Chile. Before then, political revolutions had been violent, imposed by force of arms. Allende and his left-wing coalition used peaceful means, proclaiming it unnecessary to repress one’s adversaries to achieve social justice. Radical change could happen within the confines and promises of a democracy. I have often fantasized about how different the world would be if Allende had not been overthrown, three years later, in a bloody coup. I wonder where humanity would be if his peaceful revolution had been allowed to run its course and become a template for other countries."

== Literary work ==
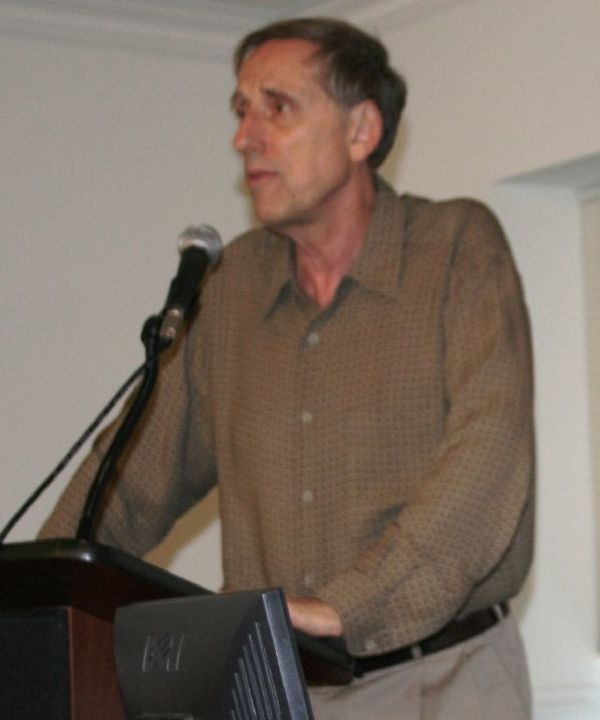
Dorfman in 2007

Dorfman's work often deals with the horrors of tyranny and, in later works, the trials of exile. In an interview in BOMB Magazine, Dorfman said, "I'm constantly trying to figure out how you can be true to an experience which in fact very few people in the world would understand, such as having most of your friends disappear or be tortured, and at the same time finding a way of telling that story so other people in other places can read their own lives into that." His most famous play, Death and the Maiden, describes the encounter of a former torture victim with the man she believed tortured her; it was made into a film in 1994 by Roman Polanski starring Sigourney Weaver and Ben Kingsley. Dorfman identified "the stark, painful Chilean transition to democracy" as Death and the Maiden's central theme. The play received a 20th anniversary revival in the 2011–2012 season at the Harold Pinter Theatre in London's West End, directed by Jeremy Herrin and starring Thandiwe Newton, Tom Goodman-Hill and Anthony Calf. The story was adapted in 2020 into a second English-language film, The Secrets We Keep, directed by Yuval Adler, screenplay by Adler and Ryan Covington, and starring Noomi Rapace, Joel Kinnaman and Chris Messina.

His thesis on the absurd in plays of Harold Pinter was published in Spanish as El absurdo entre cuatro paredes: el teatro de Harold Pinter (The absurd within four walls: the theater of Harold Pinter) by Editorial Universitaria, in Santiago, Chile, in 1968 (124 pages). Pinter later became a personal friend as well as an influence on Dorfman's work and political thinking.

A critic of Pinochet, he has written extensively about the General's extradition case for the Spanish newspaper El País and other publications, and in the book Exorcising Terror: The Incredible Unending Trial of Gen. Augusto Pinochet. Rather than distinguishing between politics and art, Dorfman believes "that one’s writing is deeply political," and, at its best, "engages the major dilemmas...of the community."

Dorfman's works have been translated into more than 40 languages and performed in over 100 countries. Besides poetry, essays and novels— Hard Rain, winner of the Sudamericana Award; Widows; The Last Song of Manuel Sendero; Mascara; Konfidenz; The Nanny and the Iceberg, and Blake's Therapy—he has written short stories, including My House Is on Fire, and general nonfiction including The Empire’s Old Clothes: What the Lone Ranger, Babar, and Other Innocent Heroes Do to Our Minds. He has won various international awards, including two Kennedy Center Theater Awards. In 1996, with his son, Rodrigo, he received an award for best television drama in Britain for Prisoners in Time. His poems, collected in Last Waltz in Santiago and In Case of Fire in a Foreign Land, have been turned into a half-hour fictional film, Deadline, featuring the voices of Emma Thompson, Bono, Harold Pinter and others.

Dorfman's human rights play, Speak Truth to Power: Voices from Beyond the Dark (based on interviews with human rights defenders conducted by Kerry Kennedy Cuomo), premiered at the Kennedy Center in Washington, D.C., in 2000, and subsequently aired on PBS as part of its Great Performances series. The play starred Kevin Kline, Sigourney Weaver, Alec Baldwin and John Malkovich, among others, and was directed by Gregory Mosher. It has gone on to numerous performances around the world, including a run in New York City. On May 3, 2010, a "Speak Truth to Power" benefit for survivors of the 2010 Chilean earthquake was put on by New York's Public Theater, directed by David Esbjornson, and featuring an all-star cast of Elias Koteas, Marcia Gay Harden, Alfred Molina, Julianne Moore, Viggo Mortensen, Gloria Reuben, Paul Sorvino, Meryl Streep, Stanley Tucci and Debra Winger.

Dorfman's play The Other Side had its world premiere at the New National Theatre Tokyo in 2004 and opened off-Broadway at the Manhattan Theater Club in 2005. Other recent plays include Purgatorio at the Seattle Rep in 2005 and at the Arcola Theatre in London in 2008; Picasso’s Closet, a counterfactual history in which the Nazis murder Picasso, had its premiere at Theater J in Washington, D.C., in 2006.

He is also the subject of a feature-length documentary, A Promise to the Dead: The Exile Journey of Ariel Dorfman, based on his memoir Heading South, Looking North and directed by Peter Raymont. The film had its world premiere at the 2007 Toronto International Film Festival on September 8, 2007. In November 2007, the film was named by the Academy of Motion Picture Arts and Sciences as one of 15 films on its documentary feature Oscar shortlist. The list was narrowed to five films on January 22, 2008, and A Promise to the Dead was not among the five Oscar-nominated documentaries.

His latest works include the Lowell Thomas Award-winning travel book, Desert Memories; a collection of essays, Other Septembers, Many Americas; a novel he wrote with his youngest son, Joaquín, Burning City; Americanos: Los Pasos de Murieta; and a new volume of memoirs, Feeding on Dreams: Confessions of an Unrepentant Exile. In 2007, his musical, Dancing Shadows, opened in Seoul, Korea. This collaboration with Eric Woolfson, the principal composer for the Alan Parsons Project, won five Korean "Tony" awards. In 2011, his play "Purgatorio" has its Spanish language premiere at the Teatro Español in Madrid, starring Viggo Mortensen and Carme Elias.

Dorfman currently has several film projects in development with his sons, Rodrigo and Joaquin Dorfman, including a screen adaptation of his novel Blake's Therapy.

Dorfman also writes regularly for such publications as The New York Times, The Washington Post, the Los Angeles Times, The Guardian (where he has a featured blog), Le Monde and L'Unità.

He is a member of L'Académie Universelle des Cultures, in Paris, and the American Academy of Arts and Sciences.

== Selected books ==
- El absurdo entre cuatro paredes: el teatro de Harold Pinter. Santiago, Chile: Editorial Universitaria, 1968.
- How to Read Donald Duck: Imperialist Ideology in the Disney Comic (Para leer al Pato Donald, 1971), with Armand Mattelart; tr. David Kunzle. London: International General, 1975 ISBN 0-88477-023-0
- The Rabbits’ Rebellion (La rebelión de los conejos mágicos, 1986), 2001
- Hard Rain (Moros en la costa, 1973), tr. George Shivers & Dorfman. Columbia (LA): Readers International, 1990
- Widows (Viudas, 1981), tr. Stephen Kessler. New York: Pantheon Books, 1983 ISBN 1-58322-483-1
- The Last Song of Manuel Sendero (La última canción de Manuel Sendero, 1982), tr. George R. Shivers & Dorfamn. New York: Viking, 1987 0140088962
- The Empire's Old Clothes. What the Lone Ranger, Babar, the Reader's Digest, and other false friends do to our minds, Pantheon Books, New York, 1983 (2nd edition 2010) (Patos, elefantes y héroes: La infancia como subdesarrollo, 1985)
- Last Waltz in Santiago and other poems of exile and disappearance (Pastel de choclo, 1986), tr. Edith Grossman & Dorfman, New York: Viking, 1988
- Mascara (Máscaras, 1988), New York: Viking, 1988
- My House Is On Fire, short stories, tr. George Shivers & Dorfman; New York: Viking, 1990
- Some Write to the Future: Essays on Contemporary Latin American Fiction (1991)
- Death and the Maiden (La muerte y la doncella, 1991), a play in three acts; London: Nick Hern Books (New York: Penguin Books, 1992).
- Konfidenz (Konfidenz, 1994), New York: Farrar, Straus, and Giroux, 1994
- Reader, drama, Nick Hern Books, London, 1995
- Heading South, Looking North: A Bilingual Journey (Rumbo al Sur, deseando el Norte, 1998), New York: Farrar, Straus, and Giroux, 1999 ISBN 0-14-028253-X
- The Nanny and the Iceberg (La Nana y el Iceberg, 1999), New York: Farrar, Straus, and Giroux, 1999
- The Resistance Trilogy (Death and the Maiden, Widows, Reader), Nick Hern Books Limited, 1998
- Exorcising Terror: The Incredible Unending Trial of Augusto Pinochet (Más allá del miedo: El largo adiós a Pinochet, 2002), Seven Stories Press, 2002 ISBN 1-58322-542-0
- Blake’s Therapy, Seven Stories Press, in New York, 2001 (Terapia)
- In Case of Fire in a Foreign Land: New and Collected Poems from Two Languages (2002)
- Other Septembers, Many Americas: Selected Provocations, 1980–2004 (2004) (Otros septiembres)
- Manifesto for Another World: Voices from Beyond the Dark. Seven Stories Press, 2004
- Desert Memories: Journeys through the Chilean North. National Geographic Books, 2004.
- Burning City (with Joaquin Dorfman) (2006) ISBN 0-375-83204-1
- Americanos: Los pasos de Murieta (2009)
- Feeding on Dreams: Confessions of an Unrepentant Exile (2011)
- Darwin's Ghost, Seven Stories Press (2020)
- The Suicide Museum, Penguin Random House (2023)
- Allegro, Other Books (2025)

== Articles ==
- "Defending Allende", The New York Review of Books, vol. LXX, no. 14 (21 September 2023), pp. 73–77. "Ever since [Salvador Allende] had won the presidency [in 1970], forces from inside and outside [Chile] had been conspiring to destroy his attempt – the first in world history – to build a socialist state through nonviolent, democratic means." (p. 73.)

== Documentaries ==
- Montes-Bradley, Eduardo (Director) (1999). Harto The Borges (Feature Documentary). USA: Heritage Film Project, US.
- Santiago Files, 2011 (Interviewee) [Feature Documentary]

== See also ==
- American literature in Spanish
