= Erik Mariñelarena =

Mexican lilm producer, screenwriter (born 1977)

- Born: Erik Mariñelarena Herrera; January 10, 1977 (age 48); Mexico City
- Occupation(s): Film director, screenwriter and producer
- Years active: 1995–present

Erik Mariñelarena Herrera (born January 10, 1977) is a Mexican film director, screenwriter and producer. He is the founder of E Corp Studio, a production company he established in 2001.

== Personal life ==
Mariñelarena was born in Mexico City. His mother was a kindergarten teacher and his father worked as a managing director at electronic component company. He is the oldest of seven children. While living in Mexico as a child, he also work in Canal Once as TV host, and during his middle school years, he appeared in various plays. Mariñelarena was educated at National Polytechnic Institute, one of the largest public universities in Mexico, and later studied filmmaking at University of Hartford, known for its performing arts and science curriculum. Afterward, Mariñelarena earned two majors from Film University in Screenwriting and Cinematography. Mariñelarena still lives in Mexico.

== Professional career ==
Erik Mariñelarena was one of the Apple employees originally responsible for marketing the Macintosh second-wave in Mexico (1995 - 2004), developing imagery/video solutions and keynotes for COMDEX, MacWorld and ExpoMac. And is referred to as one of the prime Mexican Apple evangelists.

Mariñelarena established E Corp Studio in 2001, as an advertising agency and multimedia production company, developing television commercials and websites for such clients as the telecommunications companies Iusacell, Telcel and Telmex. Other commercial work has been for clients including Maybelline, Fujifilm, Magnicharters, Coppel, Edebé, Sheraton Hotels and Resorts and Pemex.

In 2005, Mariñelarena was co-founder and chief operating officer of Eru Digital, a Mexican international provider of solutions for the creation, management, post-production, delivery and access of film and video, for the Communication, Media and Entertainment industries. In 2009, he resigned from Eru.

Mariñelarena made his feature film debut with Benjamin William's J-ok'el (2007) and scored a film festival hit with Hiro Masuda's Hotel Chelsea (2009), receiving international positive job reviews. He has announced that he will be directing the upcoming thriller Spring-Hell Jim.

== Filmography ==
Year	Film	Credited as					Studio
Year	Film	Director	Producer	Writer	Editor	Other	Studio
2002	Astral		Yes				Dreamland
2002	Amongst the Shoes	Yes		Yes	Yes		Sacrosanto Caramelo
2003	Story of a Mother	Yes	Yes	Yes	Yes	Cinematographer	E Corp Studio
2004	Faith	Yes	Yes	Yes	Yes	Cinematographer	E Corp Studio
2007	J-ok'el		Post			VFX	Out of Light Entertainment
2008	Una copa de vino		Post				Tres Centavos Films; Let Us Be
2008	Mateo's Night		Post		Yes	VFX	Eru Digital
2008	An Ally in Time		Executive		Yes		Claroscuro Producciones; E Corp Studio
2009	Quiero saber la verdad		Post				Laura Sevilla Producciones
2009	Hotel Chelsea		Post				Ichigo Ichie Films
2010	Life Insurance		Executive		Yes		Eon Films; E Corp Studio
2010	Serial Comic No.1 : Fixation		Executive		Yes	VFX	Oscuro Deseo Producciones; E Corp Studio
2010	¿Quién anda ahí?		Executive		Yes	VFX	Oscuro Deseo Producciones; E Corp Studio
2010	Doble sangre					VFX	Kaliyuri Films
2011	12th Warrior		Executive		Yes		E Corp Studio
2011	Hasta cuando?		Executive		Yes		Oscuro Deseo Producciones; E Corp Studio
2012	Ismael		Post			VFX	Inspira Producción Audiovisual; CONACULTA
2012	Sin Límites...		Post		Yes	VFX	Elemento Producciones; Becar Comercial
2013	The Frame	Yes	Executive	Yes	Yes		E Corp Studio
2013	Apricot		Yes				Árbol; Lagarto Cine
2013	The Cosmonaut		Yes				Riot Cinema Collective
2013	Z: The Definitive Documentary		Executive	Yes	Yes		Oscuro Deseo Producciones; E Corp Studio
2013	Octavio		Executive		Yes	Cinematographer	Inukshuk Films; E Corp Studio
2013	Necaxa, People in Resistance		Post				Centro de Capacitación Cinematográfica; E Corp Studio
2014	Anything Else Than Air		Yes				Imcine; Media-Mac; E Corp Studio
2014	La isla perdida		Executive				Imcine; Media-Mac; E Corp Studio
2014	Desde dentro		Executive				5.1 Comunicación
2014	Beyond the Summit: Learning to Fly		Post	Yes	Yes		Márquez Films
2014	Criósfera		Post				Elemento Producciones; Mil Nubes Cine

=== Music Videos ===
Year	Track	Credited as					Studio
Year	Track	Director	Producer	Writer	Editor	Other	Studio
2008	Solo performed by Ángel Xan		Post				Artmy
2008	Lo que fuí ayer performed by Los Daniels		Post				Inkubo Producciones
2008	I Never Wanted to Dance performed by Nikki Clan		Post				Chivo Films
2008	Shortcut to Heaven performed by Chenoa		Post				Chivo Films
2008	En otra dimensión performed by Los Daniels	Yes			Yes	VFX	Inkubo Producciones

== Awards and recognition ==
This films were met with very positive reviews from critics and received many nominations and awards.

2014

Anything Else Than Air

• Festival Latinoamericano y Caribeño de Cine de Margarita 2015
• Festival International de Films Indépendants, Genève 2015
• Riviera Maya Film Festival 2014
• IMCINE : Fondo para la Producción Cinematográfica de Calidad 2011
• Doc Meeting Argentina 2011
• Bolivia Lab III
• Iberdoc 2010
• Iberoamerican Film Crossing Borders 2010

2013

The Cosmonaut

• LA Web Fest 2014
• Richmond International Film Festival 2014
• Trail Dance Film Festival 2014

2013

Apricot

• 29° Rencontres de Toulouse
• Internationale Filmfestspiele Berlin 65°
• Cannes Marché Du Film 2015
• Guadalajara International Film Festival 30
• International Film Festival Unasur Cine 2014
• Festival International de Cinema Nyon 2013
• Ibermedia Program 2013
• Morelia International Film Festival 2010
• Bolivia Lab III

2012

Ismael

• Cannes International Film Festival 2014
• 36° Festival international du Court Métrage
• Guadalajara International Film Festival 29
• Cumbre Tajin Festival
• Cinema Perpetuum Mobile 2014
• The Berlin International Directors Lounge 2014
• 4th San Francisco Immigrant Film Festival 2013
• Premio Estatal de la Juventud 2013
• Festival de Cortometrajes ExpoCiencia Nacional 2013
• Muestra Internacional de Cortometrajes Multifest 2013
• IV Festival de Cine : Infancia y Adolescencia "Ciudad de Bogota" 2013
• Travelling Festival 2013
• Wagon International Shortfilm Festival 2013
• Todos Somos Otros 2013
• Puebla International Film Festival 2013
• Toluca International Film Festival 2013
• Ionian International Digital Film Festival 2013
• Shortlatino 2012
• Apoyo a la Producción y Postproducción de Cortometrajes 2011

2011

12th Warrior

• FIFA U-17 World Cup 2011 (Inauguration)

Octavio

• International Cervantes Culture Festival 2011

Hasta cuando?

• Mexico City International Film Festival 2011

2010

Serial Comic No. 1 : Fixation

• Underground Horror Filmfest 2013
• Macabro International Horror Film Festival 2010
• Mórbido Fest 2010

2009

Hotel Chelsea

• Japan Film Fest Hamburg 2011
• Eerie Horror Film Festival 2010
• Rhode Island International Film Festival 2010
• Okanagan International Film Festival 2010
• Seattle's True Independent Film Festival 2010
• Indie Spirit Film Festival 2010
• Myrtle Beach International Film Festival 2009
• Queens International Film Festival 2009
• Radar Hamburg International Independent Film Festival 2009

2008

An Ally in Time

• Sundance Film Festival 2009
• New York International Latino Film Festival 2008
• Crystal Display Festival 2008

Mateo's Night

• Morelia International Film Festival 2008

Una copa de vino

• Acapulco International Film Festival 2008

2007

J-ok'el

• Park City International Music Festival 2007
