= E Corp Studio =

Mexican production company

- Company type: Production company
- Industry: Film
- Founded: 2001
- Headquarters: Mexico, Mexico
- Key people: Erik Mariñelarena
- Website: www.ecorp.com.mx

E Corp Studio (also known as E Corp) is a Mexican production company founded by director, writer and producer Erik Mariñelarena. The name E Corp Studio derives from "entertainment".

== History ==
Since 2008, E Corp Studio partnered with many production companies to produce a new generation of Mexican films.

== Filmography ==
| Year | Film | Director | Notes |
|---|---|---|---|
| 2003 | The Story of a Mother | Erik Mariñelarena | |
| 2004 | Faith | Erik Mariñelarena | |
| 2008 | An Ally in Time | Miguel A. Reina | Co-production with Claroscuro Producciones |
| 2010 | Life Insurance | Miguel A. Reina | Co-production with Eon Films |
| 2010 | Serial Comic No.1 : Fixation | César Amigó | Co-production with Oscuro Deseo Producciones |
| 2010 | ¿Quién anda ahí? | Montserrat Pérez | Co-production with Oscuro Deseo Producciones |
| 2011 | Hasta cuando? | Montserrat Pérez | Co-production with Oscuro Deseo Producciones |
| 2011 | 12th Warrior | Miguel A. Reina | |
| 2013 | The Frame | Erik Mariñelarena | |
| 2013 | Octavio | José Antonio Torres | Co-production with Inukshuk Films |
| 2013 | Z: The Definitive Documentary | César Amigó | Co-production with Oscuro Deseo Producciones |
| 2013 | Necaxa, People in Resistance | Erick García Corona | Co-production with Centro de Capacitación Cinematográfica |
| 2014 | Anything Else Than Air | Carlos Hernández Vázquez | Co-production with Media-Mac / Imcine |
| 2014 | La isla perdida | Erick García Corona | Co-production with Media-Mac / Imcine |
