= Move Up =

2013 Nonfiction book by Dr. Clotaire Rapaille and Dr. Andrés Roemer

Move UP
- First edition (French)
- Author: Clotaire Rapaille and Andrés Roemer
- Original title: Move UP ¿Por qué algunas culturas avanzan y otras no?
- Language: English
- Genre: Nonfiction
- Publisher: Taurus
- Publication date: 2013
- Publication place: United Kingdom
- Media type: Print (Hardcover, Paperback)
- Pages: 352 pp
- ISBN: 978-0241187005

Move UP is a nonfiction book written by Dr. Clotaire Rapaille and Dr. Andrés Roemer in 2013 that explains upward social mobility from a biological and cultural perspective, and how societies and nations create adequate environments for maintaining the bio-logical (a term they use referring to being logical about our biology) requirements of the human species. The book is based on the latest research in biology, evolutionary psychology, behavioral economics, neuroscience and anthropology.

The authors question what factors allow us to move up taking into account the culture codes proposed by Dr. Rapaille, and their congruence with human biology, and Roemer's economic and biological precepts. Furthermore, the authors propose a new paradigm for understanding human needs and wants, contrasting Maslow's Pyramid of Needs with the Four S's: Survival, Sex, Security, and Success. These four S's express man's needs and wants whereby it is not necessary for one to be satisfied in order for the other to exist. The Four S's carry equal importance. Based on these Four S's and the move up culture codes, the authors developed the R^2 Mobility Index.

== Content ==
Move UP originated five years prior to its publishing from concerns the authors had at the World Economic Forum in Davos, Switzerland, relating to what makes people move up and why some societies move up while others don't. The explanation can be found within the interaction between biology and culture. Move UP has seven philosophical assumptions:
1. Life is a choice,
2. Life is movement,
3. The movement of life is UP,
4. The evolution of species corresponds to the evolution of societies,
5. UP is not a choice,
6. Our “universe” is not universal, and
7. Evolution is not a moral judgment.

Furthermore, as in the case of biology, evolution dictates that cultures must also compete for resources, territory, populations and the construction of a defense system; in short the survival of a culture. The movement of population is also a good indicator of which culture is moving up and which culture is moving down.

The books key points are:
1. The creation of the R^2 Mobility Index through the sum of the culture codes (C^2) with the Bio-Logical value (the sum of the Four S's), divided by two:

$$R^2 = \frac{C^2+Bio-logical}{2}$$

2. The Reptilian complex always wins.
3. Time, space and energy of the Triune Brain model: the Reptilian, the Limbic system and the Neocortex.
4. The ideal scenario allows upward mobility.
5. The methodology, the Five Critical Moves, analyze 71 countries.
6. The third unconscious is cultural.
7. A map that illustrates the R^2 Mobility Index results for the 71 countries, as well as the mobility index.
8. A conclusion, voting with your feet, whereby feet are a metaphor for moving, migrating, making a choice to move UP.

== Reception ==
The book has received mostly negative reviews. Tim Adams at The Observer UK, called it "banal in the extreme", while Bryan Appleyard at The Sunday Times UK found it "astonishing that this flawed study of success was ever published". Stephen Poole at The Spectator UK deemed it "a book of bonkers business-speak...rambling [and] pseudo-scientific.".

"Move Up is a torrent of random words arranged into perfectly focused falsehood... As a busy reviewer, one does tend to read a lot of mediocre books. But it’s been a long time since I’ve seen such a manifestly risible work put out by a reputable publishing house." —Steven Poole.

"This book debases the intellectual currency. It is, as I say, a pure marketing project, aimed at the most conventionally minded people on the planet, those who are possessed of the most unchallenging, unthinking, unreal, self-congratulatory conception of human progress. Allen Lane, distinguished science publishers, should be ashamed." —Bryan Appleyard.

The work has been specially singled out for offering broad stereotypes regarding nationalities and the difference between men and women.

However, promotional material for Move UP includes a series of positive blurbs from various thinkers around the world:

“Not since The Naked Ape have I seen a book that so gleefully revels in tweaking the nose of conventional sensitivities. Whether you love it or hate it, this quirkily perceptive –or insouciantly provocative– book will enliven dinner party conversations, and will delight and infuriate in equal measure.” —Richard Dawkins.

“An entertaining and important counterweight to the ideology and cynicism that surrounds discussions of world problems today.” —Steven Pinker.

“This is the question for the ages: why are some nations and people rich and successful, while others are poor and a failure? Why do some soar to great heights in a single generation, while others are mired forever in discord, war, and poverty? Many have tried to address small pieces of this great puzzle, but Rapaille and Roemer are the first to attempt a comprehensive answer to this eternal question. Because the stakes are so high, their work deserves serious study and attention. The destiny of nations may depend on ideas like theirs.” —Michio Kaku.

“Choices, movements, evolution, requirements for survival of the species. Why do some of us strive for more? How are culture, surroundings and education helping some societies move up more than others? These are some of the questions the authors engage by studying the paradigm between social and biological sciences. Move UP portrays the cultural and biological dimensions behind the desire of humans to ascend socially, intellectually or economically. Surprisingly being logical about our biology seems to be the key!” —Mario J. Molina.

“Move UP is a splendid book, totally engaging from start to finish. It showcases the human drive to strive for betterment within a complex matrix of our biology and culture. It challenges the reader to think about fresh ideas about ways to ascend, as well as highlighting the impediments that must be overcome to progress toward improvement. Move UP is by far the best book I've read this year.” —David Buss.

“Move UP provides a provocative and entertaining look at interactions between culture and biology that impact the progress of societies. The authors raise big questions and challenge the reader to think about them in novel ways.” —Daniel Schacter.

“Move UP considers a critical question in our globalized world ̶what sorts of countries foster social mobility in their citizens? This is a question long pondered by social scientists, but Rapaille and Roemer bring a fresh perspective to the question, viewing the subject from the standpoints of evolutionary biology, anthropology and zoology. The result is a superb book ̶provocative, smart, fun to read and very important ̶ . I recommend it highly.” —Robert Sapolsky.

“You have just been elected head of your country. You want to lead your people to new heights of happiness, prosperity, security, and freedom never enjoyed before. What should you do? The first thing you should do is read Move UP by Clotaire Rapaille and Andrés Roemer, and follow their data-driven recommendations for determining how best to achieve your goals using science, technology, and the wisdom of the greatest thinkers in history revealed in this remarkable book. Move UP is not utopian; it outlines a realistic plan for how more people in more places more of the time can lead more fulfilling and successful lives anywhere in the world.” —Michael Shermer.

“Andrés Roemer has been a leader in bringing important scientific ideas to public attention, as well as promoting human rights and effective democracy; Clotaire Rapaille has been a leader in the psychology of generating effective marketing strategies. Now, in Move UP, Drs. Roemer and Rapaille combine their talents as scientists, communicators, motivators and activists ̶with a little help from a uniquely diverse cast including Charles Darwin, Albert Camus, Sigmund Freud, Dr. Seuss and Napoleon Bonaparte ̶ to show how individuals as well as societies can move: which way? UP, of course! If you value ‘survival, sex, security and success’ (and who doesn't?) then get ready for a potentially life-altering trip!” —David P. Barash.

“Rapaille and Roemer fix their gazes on a question of great importance and intimidating complexity: how can we prosper? With inviting style, they bring to bear an array of ideas and an abundance of evidence, looking closely at the issue from a host of different vantage points. Ranging widely, the authors will delight, provoke, and very possibly inspire readers who want to know how nations can Move UP.” —Robert Kurzban.

“I think this book is terrific...In Move UP, Clotaire Rapaille and Andrés Roemer have written a book that is engaging, stimulating, and challenges us to think in new ways. Though the book is theoretically broad and ambitious, it is full of practical suggestions that can make life better. It will change the way you look at almost everything.” —Joseph Barry Schwartz.

“What are the parallels between brains and cultures? Running the gamut from stimulating to provocative, heady to poignant, this book gives you plenty to think about for moving lives and societies in the only useful direction.” —David Eagleman.

“I love the ideas put forth by my good friends, Roemer and Rapaille! The Culture Code of your home country is absolutely critical for a successful future...Cultures matters, A LOT! The good news is we can change, one by one, we can change our mindset. It's up to us. You must decide to MOVE UP, and maybe away from your home. Read the book and find out why and how.” —Ricardo Salinas Pliego.

“When does a nation's culture hold them back, and when does it fuel their progress? It is extremely hard to answer this question comprehensively enough to help guide policy change ̶whether this be economic policy, social policy or even foreign policy. ̶Roemer and Rapaille offer a cogent and coherent network of guidelines, describing not only what has worked and not worked in the past but also a set of persuasive arguments and theories as to why. Those who would tend to challenge these guidelines on the basis that they are too ‘Western,’ or in some other way parochial, would do well to ask themselves how long other paradigms need to fail before they should be abandoned.” —Aubrey de Grey.

“Clotaire Rapaille and Andrés Roemer are great storytellers and natural provocateurs, and Move UP is a treat—a clearly written and very creative exploration of the conditions that lead to happiness, freedom, and flourishing.” —Paul Bloom.

“This is the best book I have ever read about sex, success, survival, security, and the reptilian brain. Roemer and Rapaille have done an amazing job explaining difficult concepts about the human condition and life in the modern world in a fascinating, humorous, entertaining and elucidating way. I recommend this book very highly to anyone interested in learning about what life is about ̶and about what it can be.” —Amir Aczel.

“Move UP by Andrés Roemer and Clotaire Rapaille is a tour de force presenting a muscular new formula for individuals and countries to assess—and perhaps fix—their barriers to upward mobility, creativity and talent. An informative read.” —Louann Brizendine.

“How can we explain some societies are successful while others are not? How can we engineer societies that best satisfy fundamental human needs? Over two thousand years ago, Plato compared the well-functioning society to a well-functioning soul—a soul with three parts all working in harmony. In this highly engaging and accessible book, Andres Roemer and Clotaire Rapaille update Plato’s project using Maclean’s model of three brain systems to draw out what it is that makes the difference between societies that progress ̶that Move UP ̶ and those that stagnate and fail. This is a stimulating and thought-provoking book that is full of practical wisdom. I greatly enjoyed reading it, and I think that you will to.” —David Livingstone Smith.

“An ambitious and provocative book that tackles head-on the really Big Questions: What does it mean to be human? And what can we all do to become better people, leading better lives in a better world? A book that will stir controversy, tweak sacred cows and foment the best kind of debate.” —Carl Honoré.

“A revolutionary take on cultural mobility, elegantly composed yet easy to understand. Move UP serves as a whirlwind tour through history and science, exploring what drives success for individuals and societies. Bravo to Rapaille and Roemer for introducing a novel way to quantify the human condition. This interdisciplinary and thought provoking book may reshape the way readers think about our world.” —Sheril Kirshenbaum.

== See also ==
- Andrés Roemer
- Clotaire Rapaille
- Paul D. MacLean
- Triune Brain
- Maslow's Pyramid of Needs
- Abraham Maslow
- Social mobility
- Human migration
- List of countries by foreign-born population

== Bibliography ==
- Rapaille, Clotaire; Roemer, Andrés (2015). Move UP. United Kingdom: Allen Lane (Penguin Books). ISBN 978-0241187005.
