= Violeta Zúñiga =

Chilean human rights activist (1933–2019)

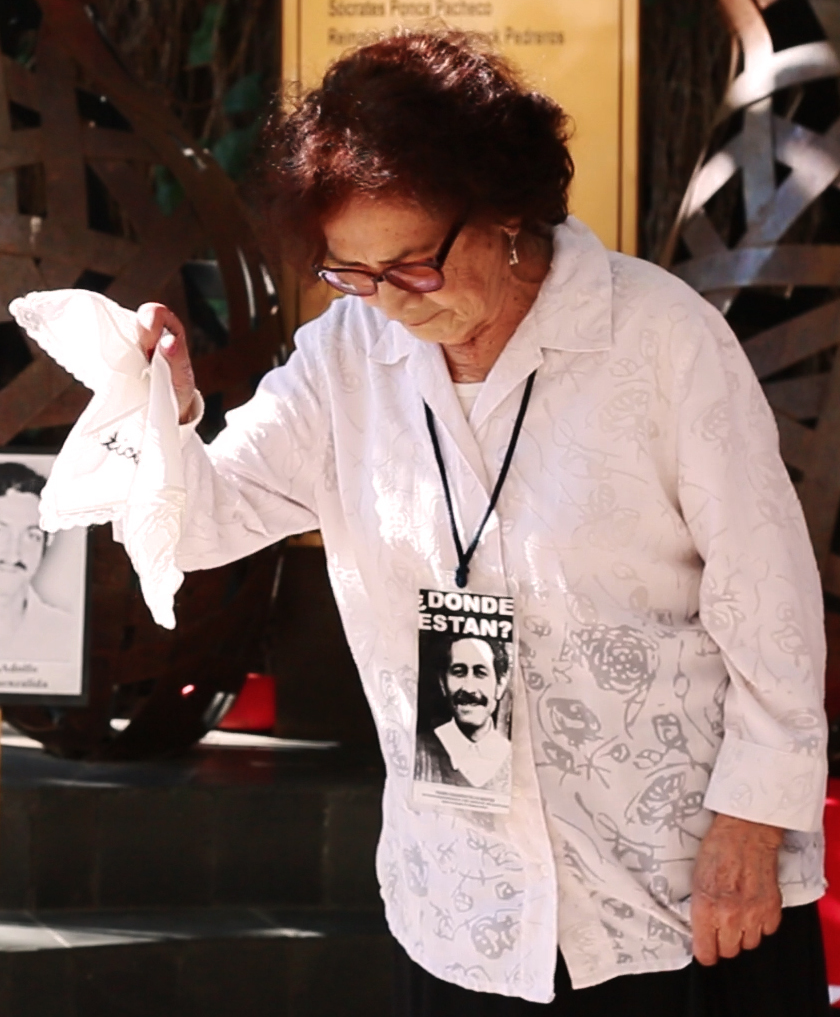
Violeta Zúñiga, 2017

Violeta Zúñiga Peralta (April 12, 1933 - February 2, 2019) was a Chilean human rights activist who was part of the Agrupación de Familiares de Detenidos Desaparecidos (Group of Family Members of Detainees and Disappeared) during the Military Dictatorship of Chile (1973-1990) until her death. She was also a member of the folk dance group, "Cueca sola", in which she participated more than a hundred times as a dancer, commemorating those who disappeared in Chile.

== Biography ==
Violeta Zúñiga Peralta was born in the town of Zúñiga, O'Higgins Region, on April 12, 1933. She lived there with her parents until the age of 13, when she emigrated to Santiago. There she met her life partner, Pedro Silva Bustos, who was detained and disappeared since August 9, 1976.

Since the disappearance of Silva, Zúñiga began a tireless search for his whereabouts, going to various human rights organizations that opposed the dictatorship and who helped the victims. There, she met other women in the same situation and she decided to form the Agrupación de Familiares de Detenidos Desaparecidos, along with other members of the Folkloric Ensemble of the Agrupación, who are notable for the original creation of the work La cueca sola. In 1987, Sting paid homage to the "Cueca sola" dance group with the song They Dance Alone, in which Zúñiga participated among the dancers. Also, the song was presented at the Amninstía concert in 1990. [ 16 ]

Together with Agrupación and the group "Women for Life", which included Diamela Eltit and Lotty Rosenfeld, among others, Zuniga planned and executed a series of protests and peaceful marches. She left the country twice after receiving threats of physical violence and detention.

Zuniga died on February 2, 2019.
