= Villoro =

Villoro is a Spanish surname that may refer to the following notable people:

- Carmen Villoro (born 1958), Mexican psychologist and psychoanalyst, daughter of Luis
- Juan Villoro (born 1956), Mexican writer and journalist, son of Luis
- Luis Villoro (1922–2014), Spanish–Mexican philosopher
