= Anything Else Than Air =

Nothing Else Than Air
- Directed by: Carlos Hernández Vázquez
- Written by: Carlos Hernández Vázquez
- Produced by: Erik Mariñelarena
- Starring: Gabriel Nájera; Maribel Villegas
- Cinematography: Jesús Nagore; Oswaldo Toledano
- Edited by: Ana Laura Calderón
- Music by: Triciclo Circus Band
- Release date: March 2010 (Guadalajara)
- Running time: 80 minutes
- Country: Mexico
- Language: Spanish

Nothing Else Than Air (Spanish: De puro aire) is a Mexican film documentary that plans to release in theaters in the autumn of 2012 in Mexico. The film is directed by Mexican director Carlos Hernández Vázquez and produced by E Corp Studio in association with Media Mac, and was shot in high definition digital cinema.

== Plot ==
Gabriel Nájera aka "El Apenas" (65 y.o.) has been selling balloons 24 hours a day for 25 years in a Mexico Cityʼs small park. He promised his wife, go back to home when ensure their children's all the way to the university. Even he has achieved his objective, he refuse to return home.

== Cast ==
- Gabriel Nájera aka "El Apenas"
- Maribel Villegas, Gabriel's wife.
- Gabriel Nájera Villegas, son.
- Maribel Nájera Villegas, daughter.

== Awards ==
- Festival Latinoamericano y Caribeño de Cine de Margarita 2015
- Black Movie Festival de Films 2015
- Riviera Maya Film Festival 2014
- IMCINE : Fondo para la Producción Cinematográfica de Calidad 2011
- Doc Meeting Argentina 2011
- Bolivia Lab 2011
- Iberdoc 2010
- International Film Crossing Borders 2010
