= Guerrero 12 =

- Directed by: Miguel A. Reina
- Written by: Miguel A. Reina
- Produced by: Erik Mariñelarena; Carlos Hernández; Alejandra Domínguez
- Starring: Mauricio Cabrera; Luis García; Jaime Guerrero; León Krauze; Andrés Roemer; Juan Villoro
- Cinematography: Xavier Xequé; Jesús Nagore
- Release date: 2011
- Running time: 70 minutes
- Country: Mexico
- Language: Spanish

Guerrero 12, also known as 12th Warrior, is a Mexican documentary film that plans to release in theaters in the winter of 2011 in Mexico. The film is directed by Mexican director Miguel A. Reina and produced by E Corp Studio, and was shot on three continents in high definition digital cinema.

== Cast ==
- Álvaro "El Mago" Romero, The Mexican association football fan, originally from Morelia, Michoacán, where a museum dedicated to him.
- Mario "Pichojos" Pérez, Currently the coach for only second division team in the state of Guerrero.
- Arturo Brizio, former association football referee from Mexico.
- Mauricio Cabrera, Analyst and commentator on Medio Tiempo, the most important sports blog in Latin America.
- Luis García, Former football player, national team.
- Jaime Guerrero, Journalist and reporter of presidential source.
- León Krauze, Host of W Radio and a member of the committee of the cultural magazine Letras Libres.
- Andrés Roemer, TV host, political scientist and philanthropist.
- Juan Villoro, Mexican writer and journalist.

== Soundtrack listing ==
| No. | Title | Writer(s) | Artist(s) | Length |
|---|---|---|---|---|
| 1. | "Antonella" | The Odyssey | Sons of Androids | 4:08 |
| 2. | "Nada que perder" | Luis Abraham Torres Reyes | Nana Pancha | 3:37 |
| 3. | "No hay culpables" | Eduardo Echeverría, Milton Henestrosa, Dario Arias | Llanto | 5:12 |
| 4. | "Guerreros" | Eduardo Vázquez Navarrete, Julián Orta Monroy | Acustick-0 | 2:40 |
| 5. | "Desatino del cuervo" | Eduardo Echeverría, Milton Henestrosa, Dario Arias | Llanto | 6:33 |
| 6. | "Solo una vez" | Sergio Solórzano, Abraham González, Aarón Vázquez | Amya / Jorge Colín | 5:19 |
| 7. | "Décima circular" | Joaquín García, Jorge León, Andrés Vogel | Perros Celestes | 3:52 |
| 8. | "Ser del cielo" | Rich Arnauda | His-Panic & Los SilverHeads | 5:28 |
| 9. | "Guerrero Ancestral" | José Antonio Torres Marin, Gerardo Torres, Rich Arnauda | Jatoma | 3:42 |
| 10. | "Sepia" | Alejandro Preisser | Triciclo Circus Band | 2:27 |
| 11. | "Orquestal" | Rich Arnauda | His-Panic & Los SilverHeads | 3:41 |
| 12. | "Pasión" | Rich Arnauda | His-Panic & Los SilverHeads | 3:06 |
| 13. | "El Mago" | Eduardo Vázquez Navarrete | Acustick-0 | 3:30 |
| 14. | "Lloren mi tango" | Alejandro Preisser | Triciclo Circus Band | 4:10 |
| 15. | "Puedes decir" | Luis Álvarez | El Haragán y Compañía | 3:08 |
