= Hotel Chelsea (film) =

- Directed by: Jorge Valdés-Iga
- Written by: Hiro Masuda
- Produced by: Hiro Masuda; Tokuji Iuchi; Yoishi Kobayashi
- Starring: Nao Nagasawa; Justin Morck; Hiro Masuda; Sawa Suzuki; Anthony Laurent
- Cinematography: Corey Eisenstein
- Edited by: Alphonse du Fleur
- Music by: Kazushi Miyakoda
- Distributed by: Ichigo Ichie Films; Ace Deuce Entertainment
- Release date: May 8, 2009
- Running time: 74 minutes
- Country: Japan
- Languages: Japanese; English

Hotel Chelsea (ホテルチェルシー) is a 2009 thriller. The production traveled to New York for filming at the classic Hotel Chelsea, a place regularly visited by celebrities, after which the film was named.

== Plot ==
A newlywed Japanese couple travel to the Hotel Chelsea in New York City to enjoy their honeymoon. One night, the wife finds the lifeless body of her husband and a video containing footage of the brutal murder. A police detective arrives at the scene and tries to reconstruct the events surrounding the mysterious crime.

== Festivals ==
- Radar Hamburg International Independent Film Festival (Nov 2, 2009)
- Queens International Film Festival (Nov 15, 2009)
- Myrtle Beach International Film Festival (Dec 4, 2009)
  - Best Foreign Picture
  - Best Actress
- Indie Spirit Film Festival (Apr 23, 2010)
- Seattle's True Independent Film Festival (Jun 9, 2010)
- Okanagan International Film Festival (Jul 23, 2010)
- Rhode Island International Film Festival (Aug 14, 2010)
- Eerie Horror Film Festival (Oct 10, 2010)
- Japan Film Fest Hamburg (May 29, 2011)

== Release ==
Early reviews for Hotel Chelsea at the 2009 Radar Hamburg International Independent Film Festival drew applause at its premiere. Hotel Chelsea official premiered in Tokyo on May 8, 2009 to critical acclaim and commercial success. In July 2010 was released on DVD. Since March 2011, Hotel Chelsea has been available online for free and it established a long term earthquake and tsunami relief fund for Japan. However as of 2025, the film was suddenly removed from public view.
