= Ciudad de las Ideas (conference) =

Annual Conference in Puebla, Mexico

La Ciudad
- Type: NGO
- Headquarters: Puebla, Mexico
- Members: 3,600+
- Official language: Spanish, English
- Founder: Andrés Roemer

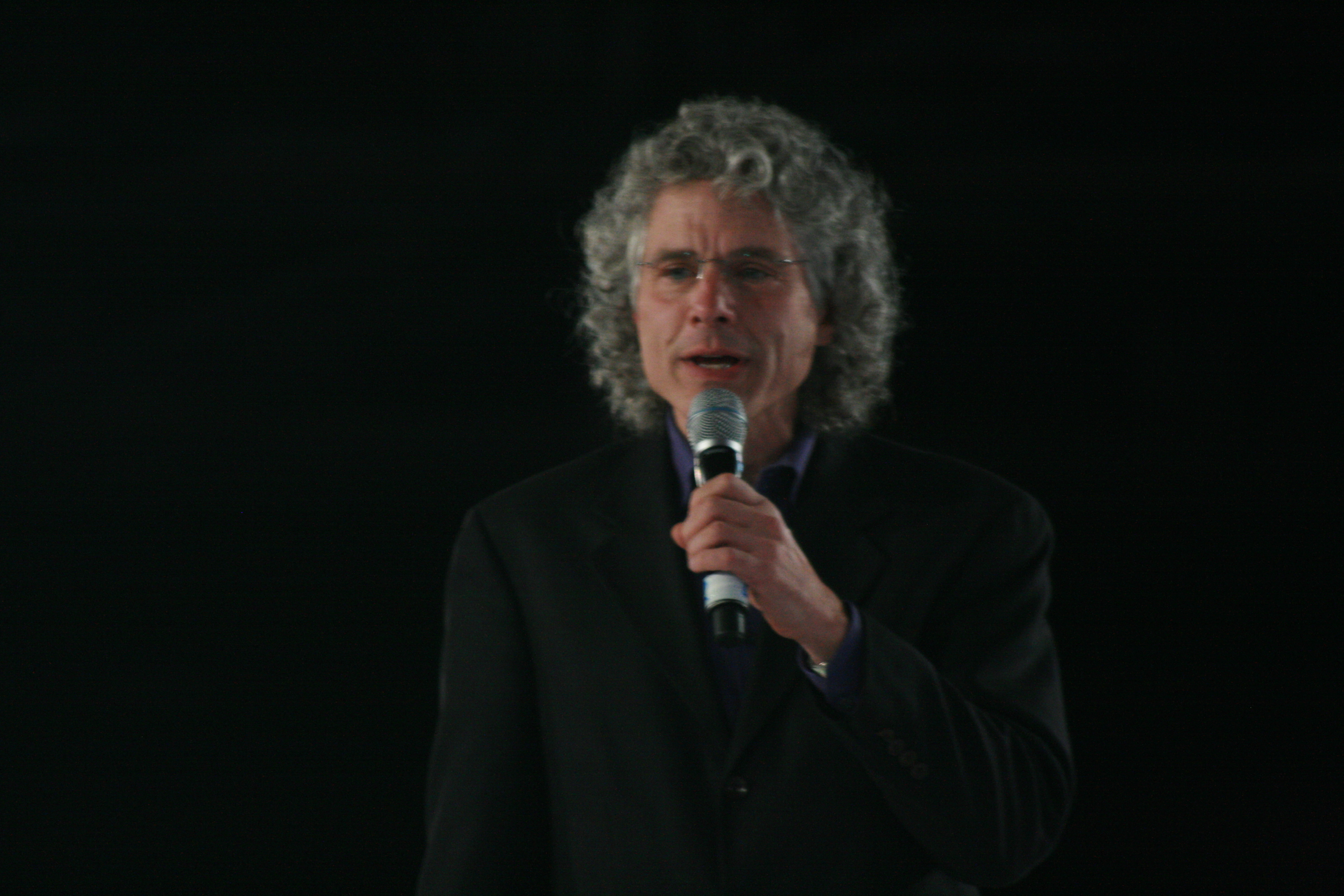
Steven Pinker at Ciudad de las Ideas 2008: Cynosura

La Ciudad de las Ideas (Spanish pronunciation: [la sjuˈðað ðe las iˈðeas]) (stylized as CDI and translated as “City of Ideas” in English) is an annual conference held in Puebla, Mexico. Introduced by the Mexican writer and television producer Andrés Roemer, the conference discusses ideas in science, technology, art, design, politics, education, culture, business, and entertainment.

From 2008 to 2021, up to 3,600 attendees gathered every November in Puebla. The heads and curators of CDI were Roemer, partner of the non-governmental organization Podor Civico A.C., and Ricardo Salinas Pliego, president and CEO of Grupo Salinas.

== History ==
=== 2021: End of Ciudad de las Ideas ===
In February 2021, the dancer and producer Itzel Schnaas denounced Andrés Roemer for sexual abuse, allegedly carried out against her during employment. Along with her case, 61 other women alleged sexual assault by the curator of the event between 2002 and 2020. In May of the same year, the Attorney General's Office (Mexico) (FGR) issued an order of extradition against Roemer, but due to his flight to Israel, INTERPOL had to be contacted to issue a red card. He was arrested on 2 October 2023 by the Israeli Police for the crime of sexual abuse and he is currently awaiting his extradition to Mexico.

Due to these events, in 2021, the "Ciudad de las Ideas" event was replaced by the Festival de las Ideas., with Ricardo Obert Martínez being replaced as director.

== See also ==
- List of CDI speakers
- Eduard Punset
- TED (conference)
- The Third Culture
