= Amir Aczel =

Israeli-born American lecturer (1950–2015)

Amir D. Aczel
- עמיר דן עכשאל
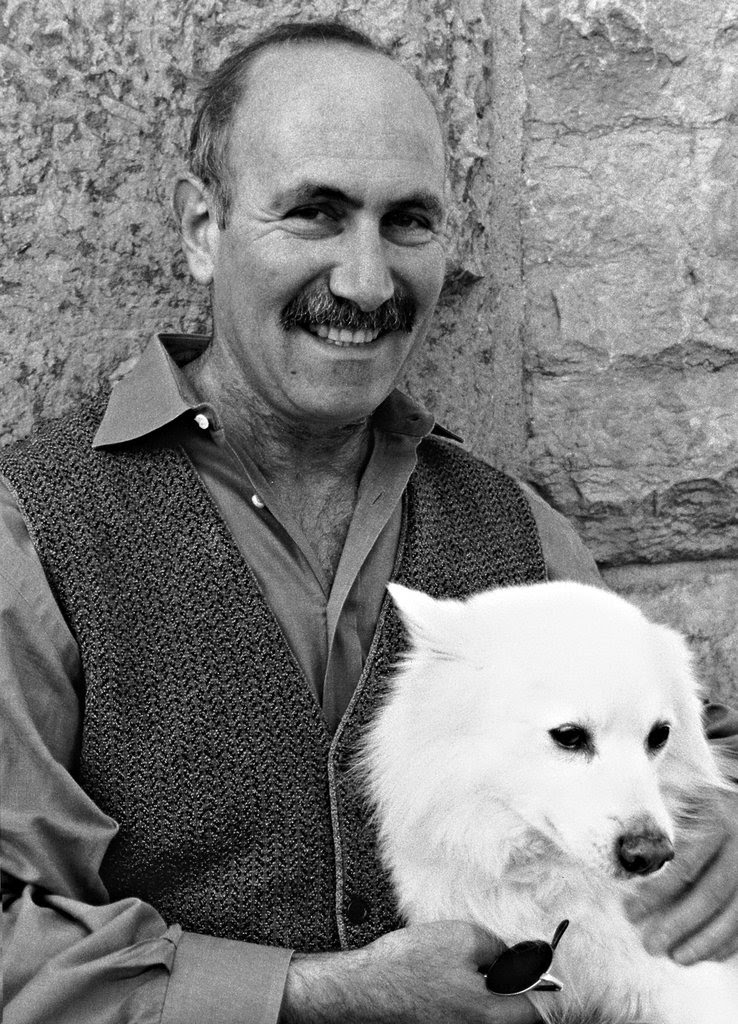
- Born: November 6, 1950; Haifa, Israel
- Died: November 26, 2015 (aged 65); Nîmes, France
- Education: University of California, Berkeley; University of Oregon
- Known for: Authoring books on mathematics and science
- Scientific career
- Fields: Mathematics, history of mathematics, history of science

Amir Dan Aczel (Hebrew: עמיר דן עכשאל; /ɑːˈmɪər ɑːkˈsɛl/; November 6, 1950 – November 26, 2015) was an Israeli-born American lecturer in mathematics and the history of mathematics and science, and an author of popular science.

== Biography ==
Amir D. Aczel was born in Haifa, Israel. Amir graduated from the Hebrew Reali School in Haifa, in 1969.

When Aczel was 21, he studied at the University of California, Berkeley. He graduated with a BA in mathematics in 1975 and received a Master of Science in 1976. Several years later, Aczel earned a PhD in statistics from the University of Oregon. He married his wife Debra in 1984, and had one daughter and one stepdaughter.

Aczel taught mathematics at universities in California, Alaska, Massachusetts, Italy and Greece. He accepted a professorship at Bentley College in Massachusetts, where he taught classes on statistics, the history of science, and the history of mathematics. He authored two textbooks on statistics.

While teaching at Bentley, Aczel wrote several non-technical books on mathematics and science, as well as two textbooks. His book Fermat's Last Theorem was a United States bestseller and was nominated for a Los Angeles Times Book Prize.

Aczel was a 2004 Fellow of the John Simon Guggenheim Memorial Foundation, a visiting scholar in the History of Science at Harvard University (2007), and was awarded a Sloan Foundation grant to research his book Finding Zero (2015). In 2003, he became a research fellow at the Boston University Center for Philosophy and History of Science, and in the fall of 2011, was teaching mathematics courses at University of Massachusetts Boston. He was a speaker at La Ciudad de las Ideas in, Puebla, Mexico, in 2008 and 2011.

In 2015, Aczel died in Nîmes, France from cancer.

== Works ==
- Complete Business Statistics, 8th Edition, 2012. ISBN 978-1935938187
- Statistics: Concepts and Applications, 1995. ISBN 978-0256119350
- How to Beat the I.R.S. at Its Own Game: Strategies to Avoid and Fight an Audit, 1996. ISBN 978-1-56858-048-7
- Fermat's Last Theorem: Unlocking the Secret of an Ancient Mathematical Problem, 1997. ISBN 978-1-56858-077-7
- God's Equation: Einstein, Relativity, and the Expanding Universe, 1999. ISBN 1-56858-139-4
- The Mystery of the Aleph: Mathematics, the Kabbalah, and the Search for Infinity, 2000. ISBN 1-56858-105-X
- Probability 1: The Book That Proves There Is Life in Outer Space, Harvest Books, January 2000. ISBN 0-15-601080-1.
- The Riddle of the Compass: The Invention that Changed the World, 2001. ISBN 0-15-100506-0
- Entanglement: The Greatest Mystery in Physics, 2002. ISBN 978-1-56858-232-0 and ISBN 978-0-452-28457-9
- Pendulum: Léon Foucault and the Triumph of Science, 2003. ISBN 0-7434-6478-8
- Chance: A Guide to Gambling, Love, and the Stock Market, 2004. ISBN 1-56858-316-8
- Descartes' Secret Notebook: A True Tale of Mathematics, Mysticism, and the Quest to Understand the Universe, 2005. ISBN 0-7679-2033-3
- The Artist and the Mathematician: The Story of Nicolas Bourbaki, the Genius Mathematician Who Never Existed, 2007. High Stakes Publishing, London. ISBN 1-84344-034-2.
- The Jesuit and the Skull: Teilhard de Chardin, Evolution, and the Search for Peking Man, 2007. ISBN 978-1-594-48956-3
- Uranium Wars: The Scientific Rivalry that Created the Nuclear Age, 2009. ISBN 978-0-230-61374-4
- The Cave and the Cathedral: How a Real-Life Indiana Jones and a Renegade Scholar Decoded the Ancient Art of Man, 2009. ISBN 978-0-470-37353-8
- Present at the Creation: The Story of CERN and the Large Hadron Collider, 2010. ISBN 978-0-307-59167-8 Aczel, Amir D. (2012). Present at the Creation: Discovering the Higgs Boson (updated ed.). Crown. ISBN 9780307591821.
- A Strange Wilderness: The Lives of the Great Mathematicians, 2011. ISBN 978-1-4027-8584-9
- Why Science Does Not Disprove God, 2014. ISBN 978-0-062-23061-4
- Finding Zero, 2015. ISBN 978-1-137-27984-2
- Ono, Ken; Aczel, Amir D. (April 13, 2016). My Search for Ramanujan: How I Learned to Count. Springer. ISBN 978-3319255668.
