= Creative director =

Designation in various creative industries

A creative director is a person who makes high-level creative decisions; oversees the creation of creative assets such as advertisements, products, events, or logos; and directs and translates the creative people who produce the end results. Creative director positions are often found within the music, film, video game, and fashion industries, as well as in other creative organizations such as web development and software development firms.

A creative director defines and leads the creative vision of a brand, product, or business. By aligning design, storytelling, innovation, and commercial objectives, they guide multidisciplinary teams to create coherent, desirable, and market-relevant experiences across every customer touchpoint.

The creative director role is vital in all of the arts and entertainment industries and can be seen an element in any product development process. The creative director may also assume the roles of an art director, copywriter, or lead designer. The responsibilities of a creative director include leading the communication design, interactive design, and concept forward in any work assigned. For example, this responsibility is often seen in industries related to advertising. The creative director is known to guide a team of employees with skills and experience related to graphic design, fine arts, motion graphics, and other creative industry fields. Some example works can include visual layout, brainstorming, and copywriting.

== Advertising ==
In the advertising industry, a creative director is determined to develop various marketing schemes and strategies for a company or client that they are hired by. Assuming one is hired by a company that is fairly well known and established, there would be some type of creative department or management that the director would work with. The creative director would also serve as the project manager who works directly with employers, and in most circumstances, they would be responsible for designing concepts for advertisements and other promotional needs for their clients. Some examples of their duties involve copywriting and laying out chronological advertisement plans which explain the ongoing process of a project. It is important for an advertisement creative director to meet their goals at a specific deadline with maximum efficiency as possible. To do so, they must be able to guide the creative department effectively from start to finish. Educational requirements of this position involve a blending of skills in business and journalism. To even be considered as a creative director, one would need to have years of experience in advertising (as little as five to as many as ten years).

Advertising creative directors are usually promoted from copywriting or art directing positions. Familiarity with filmmaking techniques is also common. Creative directors rise to become executive creative directors or chief creative officers, a position with executive responsibility for the entire creative department, and some progress to chairman of a firm.

Creative directors usually possess a communication design, fine art, or animation degree. Copywriters may have degrees in journalism, language arts, or media innovation, or may develop more emphasis on advertising copywriting while pursuing a communication design degree.

== Video games ==
With the increased team sizes and more specialized disciplines in the games industry, certain game designers are titled as "creative director", "executive designer", or "game director". A creative director in a video game company is usually responsible for product development across several titles and is generally regarded as the prime design authority across the company's product range. Some examples are Peter Molyneux, Sam Lake, Hidetaka Miyazaki, Hironobu Sakaguchi (honourable mention to Tetsuya Nomura) or Shigeru Miyamoto, whose influence extends across more than one project.

The creative director has an important responsibility in this industry. The director must devise ideas to lead a video game project forward, and many responsibilities involve working with various individuals or teams spread out within the entire project or video game production. This can include cross-functional collaboration with the various disciplines involved in game development. Academically speaking, a creative director is usually degree educated, but there are some circumstances where a high school education strongly focusing on aspects such as art, graphics, computer science, and math can be acceptable and provide some valuable insight to students who hope to aspire in this field of work. Some skills that a creative director working in the video game industry may have include proficiency in computer programming and graphic development (illustrations, fine art) and have excellent interpersonal and writing skills (since they deal with many other clients and management leaders). The exact skills a game director possesses will depend on their background in the industry. Creative director, or game director, is not usually an entry-level position, but in a smaller studio, it can be. This is more common in start-up companies, for instance, though normally one would have to earn that role by showing their skills and development over a period of years. The entertainment industry is not always a meritocracy, however, and sometimes people just luck into or inherit such positions. Creative directors have often done their share of lower-level startup positions, such as internships or assisting other directors in art-related work fields. It is all about advancing through the career chain, and once one has earned the position of a creative director, they may be eligible to work for larger and more popular game developing companies, depending on how successful they have been with past collaborative projects.

== Films ==
The creative director in the film industry is referred to as the "production designer". A production designer carries a large responsibility of designing the look of a movie. The job is similar to a creative director's role in the video game industry in that they manage a team of employees and has to consistently develop new ideas and methods of working. It is vital that designers in this field are able to produce expressive and creative ideas and translate them into something cinematic. Usually a certain sum of funds is distributed among different departments in the production of a film (in this case, the art department). Creative directors must decide on how to distribute and use the funds in the most efficient and effective way to ensure maximum quality in the films art department. An example can include the structuring of scenes and sets once a film begins to undergo the shooting process. During this process, it is important for creative directors to understand what props and effects should be used and how they should be used among various sets and scenes of the film. Some important qualifications that one should have include being able to manage teams, having expertise in design (specifically in theatre, interior sets and art design), being open minded to new ideas and methods in regards to organizing film sets, and having an understanding of coordinating among different departments in order to move a project towards success. A creative director in the film industry usually starts out in lower ranks of the chain, such as an assistant to other art directors or as a draughtsman.

== Music ==
Creative supervisors in the field of music typically have various key roles that make up the whole. It is in this artistic field where the individual must master tasks that are relatable to one another. This role would guide and direct other musicians (such as the music director or artistic director) for greater overall program effectiveness. The three roles in this sense can consist of: the active musician, the musical art director, and the instructor that teaches and informs music for society. The main requirements one would need to have is an extensive background and knowledge of music (being able to master one or more instrument), understanding the principles and theories behind music composition, developing an understanding and connection with musicians that the director would be working with to communicate music in a harmonic and creative sense, and most importantly being able to develop leadership skills among other musicians.

== Fashion ==
History of Creative Directors in Top 5 Luxury Fashion Brands according to The Vogue Business Index: Spring/Summer 2023

Creative director is the highest creative position in a fashion house. The creative director does not design clothes, but instead formulates and impresses upon the designers an overarching concept or concepts for a certain collection and the label as a whole. A fashion creative director's main role is to establish what designs should be created, what will appeal to the target market, and how the concepts will be applied and distributed in collaboration with fashion designers who are responsible for creating the clothing and fabrics. Beginning in the 2010s, fashion brands began to change creative directors on a much shorter timeline, sometimes ending a contract after less than a full calendar year. Some have taken to calling this phenomenon "fashion's musical chairs."

== See also ==
- VFX creative director
