= Carmen Villoro =

Mexican psychologist and psychoanalyst (born 1958)

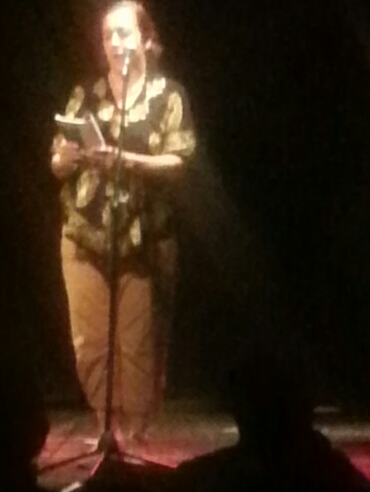
- Carmen Villoro photographed in Montréal, Québec, Canada at O Patro Výš.
- Born: 24 October 1958 (age 67); Mexico City, Mexico
- Occupations: psychologist psychoanalyst writer journalist
- Years active: 1960s-present
- Relatives: Luis Villoro (father); Juan Villoro (brother)

Carmen Villoro (born 24 October 1958) is a Mexican psychologist and psychoanalyst who also writes poetry, children's stories and has contributed to several newspapers. She is the director of the magazine Tragaluz and has won several awards for her publications.

== Biography ==
Carmen Villoro was born on 24 October 1958 in Mexico City and currently resides in Guadalajara. She studied psychology at the Universidad Iberoamericana and works as both a psychologist and psychoanalyst.

She has been the coordinator of several poetry and story workshops including Juan Banuelos (1975), Raul Renan (1984) and Vicente Quirarte (1990). In addition to her other writing, she had been a correspondent for local newspapers including Acento, La Voz de Michoacán, Público de Jalisco and Siglo 21 and she has served as director of the cultural magazine Tragaluz. She published her first poems in 1986 and her work has been included in anthologies published in Colombia, Italy, Mexico, Paraguay, Spain, the USA and Venezuela.

== Awards ==
- 1984 INBA/FONAPAS (National Fund for Social Activities) Poetry scholarship award
- 1989 Young Creators of FONCA in poetry
- 1993 FILIJ (International Fair of Children's and Youth) Essay Award

== Selected works ==
=== Essays ===
- El oficio de amar, Pax-México, 1996.
- El habitante, Cal y Arena, Libros de la Condesa, 1997.

=== Poetry ===
- Por la piel (colectivo), UNAM, Punto de Partida, 1986.
- Que no se vaya el viento, UNAM, El Ala del Tigre, 1990.
- Delfín desde el principio, UAM, Margen de Poesía, núm. 26, 1993.
- Herida luz, Hernández y Ramírez, Toque de Poesía, 1995.
- Jugo de naranja, Trilce, Tristán Lecoq, 2000.
- En un lugar geométricov, Juan Pablos/Ediciones Sin Nombre, Cuadernos de la Salamandra, 2001.
- Marcador final, UMSNH, Luna de río, 2002. || El tiempo alguna vez, FCE/U. de G., Letras mexicanas, 2004.
- Obra negra, Ediciones Arlequín, Canto de Sátiro, 2007.

=== Children's literature ===
- La media luna, CONACULTA/Corunda, 1993.
- Amarina y el viejo Pesadilla, U. de G., 1994.
- Amarina y el viejo Pesadilla y otros cuentos, Norma, Torre de Papel, 1996.
- Papalote, papelito, Ediciones SM, Giraluna, 2004.
