= Carlos Fuentes Prize =

Literary award established by the Mexican government

Carlos Fuentes International Prize for Literary Creation in the Spanish Language (Spanish: Premio Internacional Carlos Fuentes a la Creación Literaria en el Idioma Español) is a literary award established in 2012 by the Mexican government in honor of Mexican writer Carlos Fuentes. It is presented by the Secretaría de Cultura and the National Autonomous University of Mexico to a writer whose life's work have enriched humanity's heritage. Originally carrying a remuneration of US$250,000 when launched, the prize was halved to US$125,000 in 2019, which continues to place it among the richest literary prizes in the world.

The jury is composed of seven people including a member of Spain’s Royal Academy of the Spanish Language, another from the Mexican Spanish-language academy, one more from another academy in Latin America or the Philippines, and four additional academic or literary figures from Mexico.

== Recipients ==
Year	Author	Nationality	Ref(s)
2012	Mario Vargas Llosa	Peru, Spain	
2014	Sergio Ramírez	Nicaragua	
2016	Eduardo Lizalde	Mexico	
2018	Luis Goytisolo	Spain	
2019	Luisa Valenzuela	Argentina	
2020	Diamela Eltit	Chile	
2022	Margo Glantz	Mexico	
2023	Elena Poniatowska	Mexico	
2024	Luis García Montero	Spain	
2025	Gioconda Belli	Nicaragua	
2026	Juan Villoro	Mexico	
