= Occupied Palestine Resolution =

UN UNESCO 200 EX/25
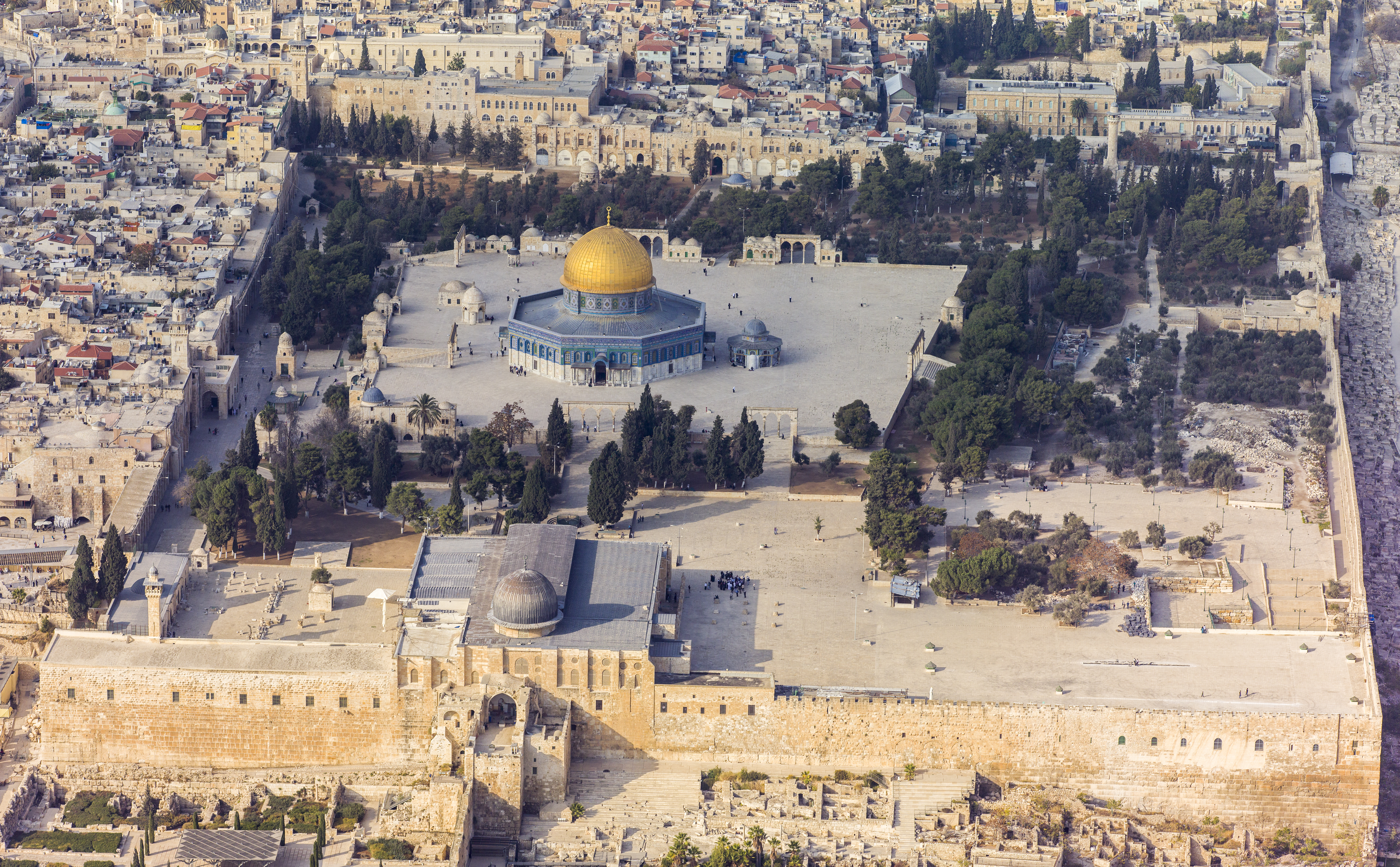
- Al-Aqsa Mosque Complex
- Date: 13 October 2016
- Meeting no.: 200
- Code: EX/PX/DR (Document)
- Voting summary: 23 voted for; 7 voted against; 28 abstained; 2 absent
- Result: Adopted

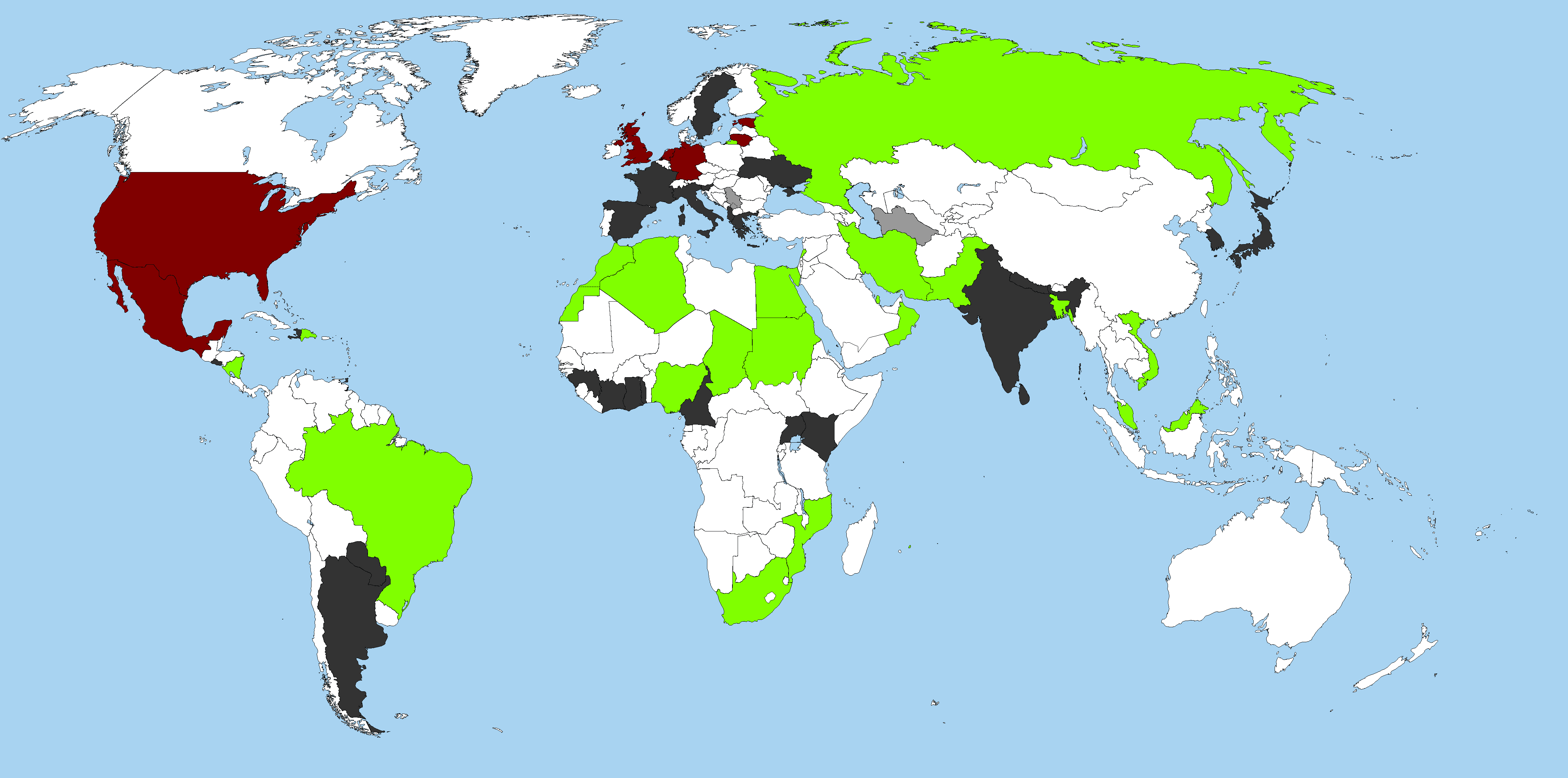
For Against Abstained Absent Mexico initially supported the resolution but since recanted.

The Occupied Palestine Resolution is the common name for Document 200 EX/25, passed on October 13, 2016, and formally ratified on October 26, 2016, as a decision of the executive board of UNESCO. The resolution is a formal condemnation of Israel, referred to throughout as "the occupying Power", for allowing alleged aggression against the Palestinian people, as well as past failures to protect exclusive Muslim use of the Abrahamic holy site the Temple Mount and infrastructure work in East Jerusalem. The resolution was intended to be put to vote in Turkey in June 2016, but the 2016 Atatürk Airport attack forced UNESCO to postpone the vote until their planned reconvening in Paris during October. The extended period of time allowed the release of the news that such a resolution was to be put into vote, and Israel expressed its outrage. The resolution was put forth by Algeria, Egypt, Lebanon, Morocco, Oman, Qatar and Sudan, and passed 24:6, with 28 abstentions. Ultimately the final count was 23:7. Those voting against included the US, Germany and Britain.

The resolution garnered brief international controversy following its ratification, drawing from accusations of anti-Semitism. Israel announced it was suspending its cooperation with UNESCO over the vote. Israel and the United States had suspended their funding to UNESCO in 2011 after the Palestinians were admitted as members. In October 2017, the United States and Israel announced their withdrawal from UNESCO, citing in-part anti-Israel bias, with effect on 31 December 2018.

== Controversy ==
Prior to the ratification of the resolution, the main object of controversy was the terminology used in the text to refer to the Temple Mount. Though a sentence was later added to acknowledge the "importance of the Old City of Jerusalem and its walls for the three monotheistic religions", it referred to the sacred hilltop compound in Jerusalem's Old City only by its Muslim name, "Al-Haram al-Sharif", without also acknowledging the Jewish name, Har HaBayit, or using more neutral or inclusive terminology. Though the Tomb of the Patriarchs and Rachel's Tomb are both listed with their Islamic and English names later in the document, none of the sites are mentioned by their older Hebrew names, including the Western Wall (Kotel HaMaaravi), which is only referred to as Al-Buraq Plaza / Western Wall Plaza. This led some to accuse UNESCO of denying both Jewish and Christian ties to the Temple Mount. Israeli prime minister Benjamin Netanyahu called the document a testament to UNESCO's growing intolerance towards Israel and the Jewish people, likening the resolution to denying Egypt's connection the Pyramids of Giza or China's connection to the Great Wall of China.

The resolution was also condemned as anti-Semitic and anti-Zionist propaganda by numerous parties, claiming that the clear attempt to remove non-Islamic ties to Israel and its holy sites is detrimental to the peace process between Israel, Palestine, and the Arab World as a whole. Mexico's envoy to UNESCO, Andrés Roemer, was fired from his position after he refused to give the Mexican government's support of the resolution and walked out of the hall. (The Mexican government later retracted its support of the resolution.) The resolution was also heavily criticized for its apparent demonization of Israel, an example being the condemnation of Israel for preventing further construction on the grounds of the Temple Mount in order to prevent damage, following a prerogative set by the Islamic Waqf that oversees the hilltop compound in 1996. The resolution was condemned by Ban Ki-moon and the Director-General of UNESCO Irina Bokova who said that Judaism, Islam and Christianity have clear historical connections to Jerusalem and "to deny, conceal or erase any of the Jewish, Christian or Muslim traditions undermines the integrity of the site. Al-Aqsa Mosque is also Temple Mount, whose Western Wall is the holiest place in Judaism." It was also rejected by the Czech Parliament which said the resolution reflects a "hateful anti-Israel sentiment", and hundreds of Italian Jews demonstrated in Rome over Italy's abstention. On October 26, UNESCO approved a reviewed version of the resolution, which also criticized Israel for its continuous "refusal to let the body's experts access Jerusalem's holy sites to determine their conservation status." Despite containing some softening of language following Israeli protests over a previous version, Israel continued to denounce the text. Following the passing of the resolution, Israel officially cut all ties with UNESCO.

Following the document's ratification, UNESCO was met with international condemnation. Palestinian leaders welcomed the decision.

At present, it appears tensions are still tight between UNESCO and Israel. In early December, Netanyahu released a stream of tweets sardonically tagging UNESCO with archaeological findings in Israel, indicating there is still conflict between the two parties.

The ratification of United Nations Security Council Resolution 2334, the first UNSC resolution to pass regarding Israel and the Palestine territories since 2009, and the first to address the issue of Israeli settlements with such specificity since Resolution 465 in 1980, in late December served to seriously intensify conflict between Israel and the UN as a whole. While the resolution did not include any sanction or coercive measure and was adopted under non-binding Chapter VI of the United Nations Charter, Israeli newspaper Haaretz stated it "may have serious ramifications for Israel in general and specifically for the settlement enterprise" in the medium-to-long term. Netanyahu declared that nations acting against Israel's interests will pay a diplomatic and economic price, and instructed the Foreign Ministry to cancel all aid programs to Senegal, some involving programs to alleviate poverty, in response to the resolution's passage.

== See also ==
- List of United Nations resolutions concerning Israel
- List of United Nations resolutions concerning Palestine
