= Miguel A. Reina =

Mexican film director (born 1980)

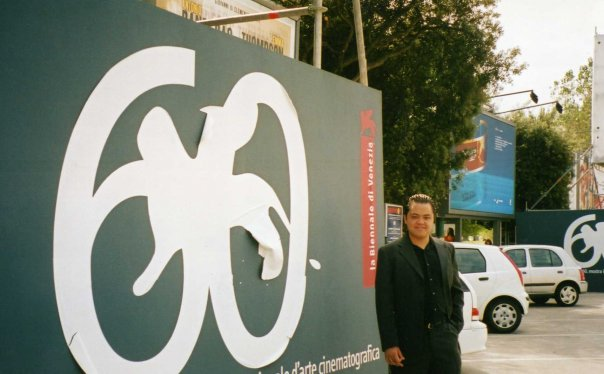
- At the 60th Venice International Film Festival
- Born: Miguel Alejandro Reina Gómez Maganda; 11 August 1980 (age 46); Acapulco City, Guerrero
- Years active: 2003 – present

Miguel Alejandro Reina Gómez Maganda (Spanish pronunciation: [miˈɣel aleˈxandɾo ˈɣomes]; born 11 August 1980) is a Mexican filmmaker, screenwriter and film producer. Some of his works include Un aliado en el tiempo, Mi vida en frenesí, Trazos mágicos de Oaxaca and El hombre que detuvo el tiempo.

== Early life ==
Reina was born in Acapulco City. He studied Mass Communication at the Universidad del Nuevo Mundo (UNUM) and filmmaking at SAIC (School of the Art Institute of Chicago). also attended CECAAP (Centro de Capacitación Artística Profesional). He began working on television in Mexico, first as a producer assistant and then as a screenwriter. Reina's television work led to assignments as a creative director for several advertising spots, and in 2003, he landed his first awarded screenplay Pan de dulce.

He was honored guest at the 60th Venice International Film Festival.

== El Hombre que detuvo el tiempo (The man who stops time) ==
El Hombre que detuvo el tiempo is a documentary about Andrés Henestrosa (a Mexican writer and politician) for cultural television Canal 22. In addition to writing, Reina directed the film. It is somewhat unusual for televisión writers to be credited directors. Reina continued this close involvement in directing on several of his later films.

The film, was a big hit in Mexico, and was enthusiastically received around the world. Grupo Pegaso's director Emilio Braun Burillo was so impressed with El Hombre que detuvo el tiempo that he hired Reina to direct Trazos mágicos de Oaxaca, a documentary film produced for the group in 2007.

== International success ==
In 2008, Reina released his first short film Mi vida en frenesí, a biopic based on Josefina Gómez Maganda, his grandmother. This short film was very well received also won Pérdidas Film Festival for Best Short Film.

Reina's next feature was also a short film, Un aliado en el tiempo (An ally in time). It was a nostalgic and metaphysic film fiction about a death-defying escapologist. It interweaves nine separate yet connected storylines, about the interactions among nineteen people during one day in Mexico City.

Filmmaker Carlos Carrera act like film sponsor. The short film was an international hit and a major success with critics.

Un aliado en el tiempo won Best Music Award in Pantalla de Cristal Film Festival and made its way to the Sundance Film Festival and New York International Latino Film Festival the following year.

In 2009, Reina directed his third short film Seguro de vida (Life insurance). Reina faced criticism from some of the more purist insurance specialist for his approach to the idea.

Reina's next feature film, Guerrero 12 (12th Warrior), a documentary about the Mexican soccer fandom starring Juan Villoro, Luis García, Andrés Roemer, Jaime Guerrero, León Krauze and Mauricio Cabrera, is in production.

He created the production company Eon Films.

Reina also write the famous public advertising "Vivir is increíble" (Life is incredible) for GNP Insurance, winning excellent reviews for its positive and nostalgic portrayal of family relationships.

== Awards and nominations ==
- Mi vida en frenesí (2008)
  - Pérdidas Film Festival Best Short Film
- Un aliado en el tiempo (2009)
  - Pantalla de Cristal Film Festival Best Music
  - Sundance Film Festival Official selection
  - New York International Latino Film Festival Official selection

== Filmography ==
Year	Film	Credited as		
Year	Film	Director	Writer	Producer
2004	Sesiones			Yes
2006	El hombre que detuvo el tiempo	Yes	Yes	
2007	Trazos mágicos de Oaxaca	Yes	Yes	
2008	Mi vida en frenesí	Yes	Yes	
2009	Un aliado en el tiempo	Yes	Yes	
2010	Seguro de vida	Yes	Yes	
2011	Guerrero 12	Yes	Yes	
