= Luis García (footballer, born 1969) =

Mexican footballer

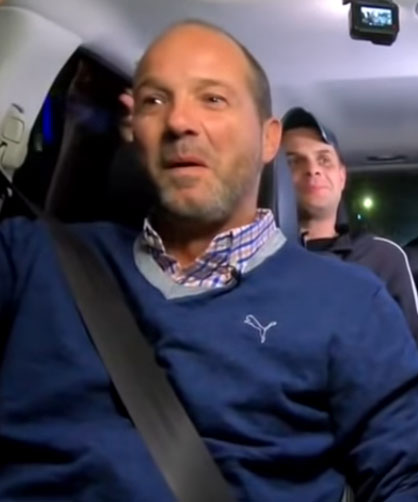
- García in 2018

Personal information
- Full name: Luis García Postigo
- Date of birth: 1 June 1969 (age 57)
- Place of birth: Mexico City, Mexico
- Height: 1.71 m (5 ft 7 in)
- Positions: Forward; winger

Senior career*
Years	Team	Apps	(Gls)
1985–1992	Pumas UNAM	195	(75)
1992–1994	Atlético Madrid	58	(28)
1994	Real Sociedad	10	(0)
1995–1997	América	78	(39)
1997–1998	Atlante	29	(14)
1998–2000	Guadalajara	56	(20)
2000	Morelia	17	(8)
2001	Puebla	1	(0)
Total		444	(184)

International career
1996	Mexico Olympic (O.P.)	4	(0)
1991–1999	Mexico	77	(28)
Medal record
Representing Mexico
Winner	CONCACAF Gold Cup	1996
Runner-up	Copa America	1993
Third place	CONCACAF Gold Cup	1991
- * Club domestic league appearances and goals

Luis García Postigo (born 1 June 1969) is a Mexican former professional footballer who played as a forward.

Today he is a football commentator for TV Azteca (nicknamed "Doctor Garcia") and narrates alongside Argentine Mexican commentator Christian Martinoli.

== Club career ==
García made his professional debut with Pumas UNAM at the age of 17, in a match against Leones Negros. During the 1990–91 season, he won the Primera División title and finished as the league’s top scorer; a feat he would repeat the following season.

García joined Atlético Madrid ahead of the 1992–93 season. In his debut season in Spain, he scored 17 goals, the best debut by a Mexican player in La Liga. His second season was marked by a noticeable dip in form and growing tensions with club management, ultimately leading to his transfer to Real Sociedad. His time at San Sebastián was brief, he played 10 matches and left six months later without scoring a single goal.

In January 1995, García returned to Mexico to join Club América, fulfilling a lifelong dream. Two years later, he moved to Atlante, finishing the Invierno 1997 tournament as the league’s top scorer for the third time in his career.

In the final years, he played for Guadalajara and Morelia, before concluding his career with Puebla. Reflecting on his early retirement at the age of 31, García stated that he had lost his passion for football.

== International career ==
For the national team, he compiled 77 caps, scoring 28 goals and played in the 1994 World Cup, scoring both Mexico goals in their first round victory versus the Republic of Ireland. He was the tournament top scorer with 3 goals in the 1995 King Fahd Cup (later renamed the Confederations Cup). He was selected to be part for the Mexico team for the 1998 FIFA World Cup, however he did not see action in the tournament.

He was selected as one of 3 overage players on the Mexico Olympic team at the 1996 Summer Olympics.

== Retirement ==
After retiring, he picked up a commentator spot with TV Azteca. He left the job when he was offered the position of Vice-President of Monarcas Morelia. After leaving Morelia, He currently has returned to TV Azteca to his old job of a commentator in TV Azteca Sport Programs.

In 2011, García appear in film production Guerrero 12, a feature-length documentary examining soccer fandom passion. The film is directed by Miguel A. Reina, who was also responsible for the Sundance film Un aliado en el tiempo.

Garcia is also a Spanish color commentator for the North American version of Pro Evolution Soccer alongside TV Azteca commentator Christian Martinoli.

== Personal life ==
García has been accused of domestic violence by his former wife, Kate del Castillo (married 2001–2004).

== Honours ==
Pumas UNAM

- Mexican Primera División: 1990–91
- CONCACAF Champions' Cup: 1989

Mexico

- CONCACAF Gold Cup: 1996

Individual

- Mexican Primera División Golden Ball: 1990–91, 1991–92
- Mexican Primera División Golden Boot: 1990–91, 1991–92, Invierno 1997
- FIFA Confederations Cup Top Scorer: 1995
- Copa América Top scorer: 1995

== Career statistics ==
Scores and results list Mexico's goal tally first, score column indicates score after each García goal.

List of international goals scored by Luis García
No.	Date	Venue	Opponent	Score	Result	Competition
1	4 December 1991	Estadio León, León, Mexico	Hungary	2–0	3–0	Friendly
2	11 March 1992	Estadio Tamaulipas, Tampico, Mexico	CIS	1–0	1–1	Friendly
3	22 November 1992	Estadio Azulgrana, Mexico City, Mexico	Costa Rica	1–0	4–0	1994 FIFA World Cup qualification
4	22 November 1992	Estadio Azulgrana, Mexico City, Mexico	Costa Rica	3–0	4–0	1994 FIFA World Cup qualification
5	18 April 1993	Estadio Azteca, Mexico City, Mexico	El Salvador	2–0	3–1	1994 FIFA World Cup qualification
6	2 May 1993	Estadio Tiburcio Carías Andino, Tegucigalpa, Honduras	Honduras	3–0	4–1	1994 FIFA World Cup qualification
7	11 June 1994	Orange Bowl, Miami, United States	Northern Ireland	1–0	3–0	Friendly
8	11 June 1994	Orange Bowl, Miami, United States	Northern Ireland	2–0	3–0	Friendly
9	24 June 1994	Citrus Bowl, Orlando, United States	Republic of Ireland	1–0	2–1	1994 FIFA World Cup
10	24 June 1994	Citrus Bowl, Orlando, United States	Republic of Ireland	2–0	2–1	1994 FIFA World Cup
11	6 January 1995	King Fahd International Stadium, Riyadh, Saudi Arabia	Saudi Arabia	1–0	2–0	1995 King Fahd Cup
12	6 January 1995	King Fahd International Stadium, Riyadh, Saudi Arabia	Saudi Arabia	2–0	2–0	1995 King Fahd Cup
13	10 January 1995	King Fahd International Stadium, Riyadh, Saudi Arabia	Denmark	1–0	1–1	1995 King Fahd Cup
14	29 March 1995	Los Angeles Memorial Coliseum, Los Angeles, United States	Chile	1–0	1–2	Friendly
15	6 July 1995	Estadio Campus Municipal, Maldonado, Uruguay	Paraguay	1–0	1–2	1995 Copa América
16	9 July 1995	Estadio Campus Municipal, Maldonado, Uruguay	Venezuela	1–0	3–1	1995 Copa América
17	9 July 1995	Estadio Campus Municipal, Maldonado, Uruguay	Venezuela	2–0	3–1	1995 Copa América
18	13 July 1995	Estadio Centenario, Montevideo, Uruguay	Uruguay	1–0	1–1	1995 Copa América
19	30 November 1995	Los Angeles Memorial Coliseum, Los Angeles, United States	Colombia	2–1	2–2	Friendly
20	11 January 1996	Jack Murphy Stadium, San Diego, United States	Saint Vincent and the Grenadines	1–0	5–0	1996 CONCACAF Gold Cup
21	11 January 1996	Jack Murphy Stadium, San Diego, United States	Saint Vincent and the Grenadines	2–0	5–0	1996 CONCACAF Gold Cup
22	21 January 1996	Los Angeles Memorial Coliseum, Los Angeles, United States	Brazil	1–0	2–0	1996 CONCACAF Gold Cup
23	8 June 1996	Cotton Bowl, Dallas, United States	Bolivia	1–0	1–0	1996 U.S. Cup
24	12 June 1996	Giants Stadium, East Rutherford, United States	Republic of Ireland	1–0	2–2	1996 U.S. Cup
25	12 June 1996	Giants Stadium, East Rutherford, United States	Republic of Ireland	2–2	2–2	1996 U.S. Cup
26	8 June 1997	Estadio Cuscatlán, San Salvador, El Salvador	El Salvador	1–0	1–0	1998 FIFA World Cup qualification
27	5 October 1997	Estadio Azteca Mexico City, Mexico	El Salvador	5–0	5–0	1998 FIFA World Cup qualification
28	31 May 1998	Stade olympique de la Pontaise, Lausanne, Switzerland	Japan	1–0	2–1	Friendly
