= Carlos Hernández Vázquez =

Mexican producer (born 1983)

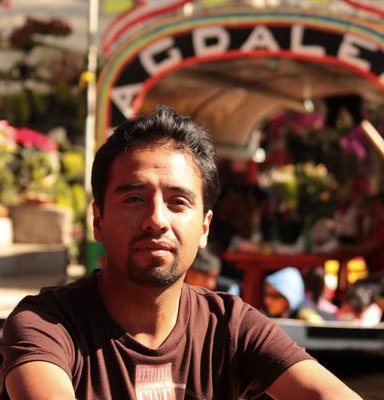
- Born: August 14, 1983 (age 29); Celaya, Guanajuato, Mexico
- Occupation: Film producer
- Years active: 2009 – 2013

Carlos Hernández Vázquez (born August 14, 1983) is a Mexican producer who lived in Mexico City during most of the last decade of his career.

== Early life ==
Carlos Hernández Vázquez was born in Celaya, Guanajuato.

== Career ==
During his working years, Hernández was particularly inspired by the film production process, and studied film production workshop at the Centro de Capacitación Cinematográfica.

== Awards and recognition ==
Year	Title	Credited	Awards	Official selection
2009	Aquellos sin nombre (Short)	Director, co-writer	UNAM Young Filmmakers Contest	Havana Iberoamerican Film Festival, DocuLab, Valle de Bravo International Film Festival, DOCSDF, International Film Festival Expresión en corto, Shorts Shorts Film México, Chihuahua Film Festival
2009	Amanecer (Short)	Producer		Cannes Festival, Paris International Film Festival, Shorts Shorts Films Mexico, Cine Lebu International Festival, Kinoki Film Festival, Guanajuato International Film Festival, CinemadaMare
2014	De puro aire	Director, co-writer	Iberdoc	International Film Crossing Borders, Bolivia Lab.

== Frequent collaborators ==
Hernández did on several occasions work with the same crew more than once. Erick García Corona (Film director), Oswaldo Toledano (Mexican cinematographer) and Axel Barba (location sound recordist) are frequent collaborators.

== Filmography ==
Year	Film	Credited as		
Year	Film	Director	Co-writer	Producer
2009	Amanecer (Short)			Yes
2009	Aquellos sin nombre (Short)	Yes	Yes	
2011	Guerrero 12			Yes
2013	Necaxa: Un pueblo en resistencia			Yes
2014	De puro aire	Yes	Yes	
