= Juan Villoro =

Mexican writer and journalist

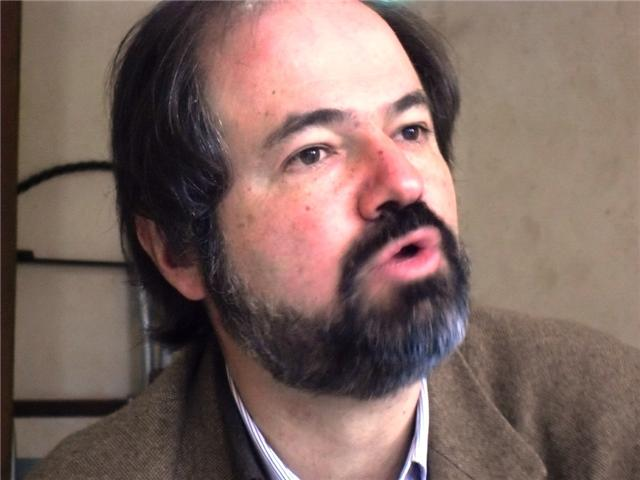
- Juan Villoro in Mexico City, January 2009
- Born: Juan Antonio Villoro Ruiz; 24 September 1956 (age 70); Mexico City, Mexico
- Education: Universidad Autónoma Metropolitana
- Occupations: Writer and journalist

Juan Antonio Villoro Ruiz (Note: In this Mexican name, the surname is Villoro and the second or maternal family name is Ruiz.) (born 24 September 1956) is a Mexican writer and journalist. He has been well known among intellectual circles in Mexico, Latin America and Spain for years, but his success among a wider readership has grown since receiving the Herralde Prize for his novel El testigo in 2004. He is the son of philosopher Luis Villoro.

== Biography ==
Born in Mexico City, Juan Villoro received his bachelor's degree in sociology from the Metropolitan Autonomous University, Iztapalapa campus. He was also part of a short story workshop conducted by Guatemalan writer Augusto Monterroso. As a rock music fan, he was the DJ for the radio program "El lado oscuro de la luna" (the Spanish translation of The Dark Side of the Moon) on Radio Educación from 1977 until 1981. He was then made the cultural attaché to Berlin in the then German Democratic Republic.

For three decades, Villoro has produced a steady output of articles for various Mexican periodicals, concentrating in such areas as sports, rock, cinema, literature and travel. Palmeras de la brisa rapida: un viaje a Yucatán ("Palm Trees of the Rapid Breeze: A Journey to Yucatan", 1989) is an account of his travels in a part of Mexico known for its Mayan culture. His first novel was El disparo de argón ("The Shot of Argon"), published in 1991. Los once de la tribu ("The Eleven of the Tribe"), published in 1995, collects many of his best short, non-fiction essays and interviews. The title refers to the number of people on an international football team. He covers a wide range of topics, including Andy Warhol, the Rolling Stones, the television series Dallas, the absurdities of publishing children's literature in the United States and an interview with Jane Fonda.

In 2011, Villoro appeared in the film production Guerrero 12, a feature-length documentary examining football fandom passion. The film is directed by Miguel A. Reina, who was also responsible for the Sundance film Un aliado en el tiempo.

In 2018 he received Chile's Manuel Rojas Ibero-American Narrative Award and, in 2026, the Mexican government's Carlos Fuentes Prize.

== Interests ==
Since he was a child, Villoro has been fond of football. He is a fan of Barcelona, influenced by the fact that his father is from the region. Villoro played in the lower divisions Pumas of the National Autonomous University of Mexico, but left the team when he was 16. When he began writing about football, he described himself as being a fan of being a fan.

He has consistently written chronicles, a genre that he defines as the platypus of prose, due to the large number of varying influences that chronicles can require.

He began writing theater when he was 50 years old.

As a rock music fan, Villoro collaborated with Mexican band Café Tacuba on the songs "Sashimi (Corte fino)" and "Laberinto" for the film Vivir mata, directed by Nicolás Echevarría.

Villoro is also a professor at the Gabriel García Márquez Foundation for New Ibero-American Journalism and was a member of the dean's council for the Gabriel García Márquez Prize for Journalism, which meets annually in Medellín.

== Works ==
=== Novels ===
- El disparo de argón (1991)
- Materia dispuesta (1997)
- El testigo (2004)
- Llamadas de Ámsterdam (2007)
- Arrecife (2012)
- La utilidad del deseo (2017)
- La tierra de la gran promesa (2021)

=== Short stories ===
- La noche navegable (1980)
- La alcoba dormida (1992)
- Albercas (1985)
- La casa pierde (1999)
- Los culpables (2007)
- "Orden suspendido," in Manuel Felguérez Obra Reciente 2002-2005 (2005)
- "Palmeras de la brisa rápida" (2009)
- Forward: Kioto (2010)
- Espejo Retrovisor (2013)

=== Children's books ===
- Las golosinas secretas (1985)
- El profesor Zíper y la fabulosa guitarra eléctrica (1992)
- Autopista sanguijuela (1998)
- El té de tornillo del profesor Zíper (2000)
- Cazadores de croquetas (2007)
- El libro salvaje (2008)
- El taxi de los peluches (2008)
- La cuchara del señor Zíper (2015)

=== Essays, chronicles, and non-fiction ===
- Tiempo transcurrido (Crónicas imaginarias) (1986)
- Palmeras de la brisa rápida: Un viaje a Yucatán (chronicle, 1989)
- Los once de la tribu (football chronicles, 1995)
- Efectos personales (essay, 2000)
- Safari accidental (chronicle, 2005)
- Dios es redondo (essays and chronicles on football, 2006)
- Funerales preventivos: Fábulas y retratos (political essays, with drawings by Rogelio Naranjo, 2006)
- De eso se trata (literary essays, 2008)
- Manuel Felguérez el límite de una secuencia (1997)
- La máquina desnuda (essay, 2009)
- 8.8: Miedo en el espejo (chronicle,2010)
- ¿Hay vida en la Tierra? (articles, 2012)
- El Ojo en la Nuca (Stavans, ilan / Villoro, Juan, 2014)
- El vértigo horizontal (Barcelona: Anagrama, 2019. English translation: Horizontal Vertigo: A City Called Mexico, Knopf, 2021)
