= Luis Villoro =

Mexican philosopher

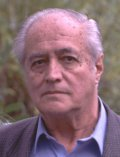
- Villoro in 1999
- Born: 3 November 1922; Barcelona, Spain
- Died: 5 March 2014 (aged 91); Mexico City, Mexico
- Relatives: Carmen Villoro (daughter); Juan Villoro (son); Estela Ruiz Milán (wife)

Luis Villoro Toranzo (3 November 1922 – 5 March 2014) was a Spanish–Mexican philosopher, researcher, university professor, diplomat, academic and writer. He published more than ten books between 1950 and 2007.

Villoro was born in Barcelona on 3 November 1922 to a Spanish father and a Mexican mother. Between 1983 and 1987, he was a delegate for Mexico in UNESCO. He was named an honorary member of the Academia Mexicana de la Lengua in 2007.

Luis Villoro received the Premio Nacional de Ciencias y Artes in 1986, for his effort in the field of history, social sciences, and philosophy. In 2004 he received an honorary doctorate from the Universidad Autónoma Metropolitana, Villoro died from respiratory failure on 5 March 2014 in Mexico City. He was 91 years old.

== Thought ==
The main themes of the philosophy of Luis Villoro are the following: metaphysical understanding of otherness, the limits and scope of reason, the link between knowledge and power, the search for communion with others, ethical reflection on injustice, the defense of respect for cultural differences, and the critical dimension of philosophical thinking. His long intellectual career can be divided into three stages: a first stage of the particular or of the historical philosophy, a second stage of the universal or theoretical philosophy, and "synthesis" or practical philosophy.

Among the topics Villoro studied were Indigenous American philosophy, the thought of Ludwig Wittgenstein and of René Descartes, he also dedicated important texts to reflection about silence. He conducted an important study on movements related to native culture in Mexico, what he called "the independence revolution," in line with the multicultural nature of Mexico, and a reflection on the need to think of an expanded democracy following the uprising of the EZLN in 1994.

== Bibliography ==
- Los grandes momentos del indigenismo en México, México: El Colegio de México, 1950.
- El proceso ideológico de la revolución de independencia, México: UNAM, 1953.
- Páginas filosóficas, Jalapa: Universidad Veracruzana, 1962.
- La idea y el ente en la filosofía de Descartes, México: FCE, 1965.
- Signos políticos, México: Grijalbo, 1974.
- Estudios sobre Husserl, México: UNAM, 1975.
- Creer, saber, conocer, México: Siglo XXI, 1982.
- El concepto de ideología y otros ensayos, México: FCE, 1985.
- El pensamiento moderno. Filosofía del renacimiento, México: FCE / El Colegio Nacional, 1992.
- En México, entre libros. Pensadores del siglo XX, México: FCE, 1995.
- El poder y el valor. Fundamentos de una ética política, México: FCE / El Colegio Nacional, 1997.
- Estado plural, pluralidad de culturas, México: Paidós / UNAM, 1998.
- De la libertad a la comunidad, México: Ariel / ITESM, 2001.
- Los retos de la sociedad por venir, México: FCE, 2007.
