= VFX creative director =

Visual effects person

The VFX creative director is a position common in films, television programs, and computer games using a large amount of visual effects (VFX).

For films which are fully or partly computer generated, a VFX creative director works closely with the director. On smaller VFX-intensive productions such as music videos or some television commercials, a VFX creative director may also assume the responsibilities of the director. They are charged with making creative and aesthetic choices for visual effects. Although the role is generally more creative in nature, most VFX creative directors have a technical background and may exert a strong practical hand in production.

== Responsibilities ==
The responsibilities of a VFX creative director are very much like those of an art director, production designer, or chief creative officer, though with a particular focus on the computer-generated imagery of their projects. They are primarily responsible for directing and supervising the creative and technical execution of visual effects sequences, from concept to completion, including:

- Set extensions and matte painting
- Bluescreening
- Digital animation
- Digital effects
- Compositing

The VFX creative director may delegate responsibilities to visual effects supervisors, visual effects editors, film compositors, rotoscope artists, matte painters, and 3D animators.

VFX creative directors may therefore have input on various aspects of production, including:

- Story development and storyboarding
- Blocking, staging, locations
- Advising the director on actor movement
- Cinematography
- Costume, makeup, and props, particularly when there are special effects considerations

== Educational requirements ==
As with much of the film industry, merit is awarded on the quality of work produced and not on academic qualifications. Bachelor's or master's degrees in film and television, digital media, design, or animation may be beneficial. There are a suite of skills and conditions that predispose an individual to successful operation as a VFX creative director:

- Experience from at least 5–10 years in the industry
- An understanding of the production process from concept to completion
- A deep familiarity with post-production pipelines, techniques, and software
- A strong balance of both creative and practical / technical skills
- Excellent communication and people-management skills
- Ability to guide and lead a team to extract their best work according to a predefined vision
- A strong grasp of all aspects of film theory

== See also ==
- Creative director
- Art director
- Visual effects
- Visual effects supervisor
- Chief creative officer
- Graphics coordinator
