= Lotty Rosenfeld =

Chilean artist (1943–2020)

Carlota Eugenia "Lotty" Rosenfeld Villarreal (20 June 1943 – 24 July 2020) was a Chilean interdisciplinary artist. She was active in Santiago during the Chilean coup d'état of the 1970s. Her work was characterised by provocative public art interventions, including manipulating road signs. It has been exhibited in several countries throughout Latin America, and internationally in places such as Europe, Japan, and Australia.

== Art movement and involvement in art ==
Rosenfeld's involvement in art happened during the Chilean military coup d'état period. Under this regime, she utilized her artwork to demonstrate how official power and conflict zones submit bodies to the margins and borders. She wanted to be separate from the guarded spaces of art and its market; therefore, she used the streets to perform her work, ultimately interrogating political and cultural spaces. With her art, she hoped that she could change the mentality of people by altering history of her country. The initial medium in which she worked was video recording. She then associated herself with neo-vanguardism and the Escena de Avanzada, a movement of artists and writers that appeared on the Chilean art scene after the 1973 Chilean coup d'état. In 1979, along with poet Raúl Zurita, sociologist Fernando Balcells, writer/artist Diamela Eltit, and artist Juan Castillo, she formed CADA (Colectivo de Acciones de Arte) or (Art Actions Collective).

CADA is a collective activist and artist group that used interventions and performance to challenge the Pinochet regime in Chile throughout the 1970s and 1980s. She has also been involved with Fluxus, an experimental international interdisciplinary group related to visual arts, music, and literature. Rosenfeld and CADA's work focused on transforming and intervening in public urban space through symbolism, aiming to challenge social political structures and authority. During this period Rosenfeld's work involved performances and video installations. One of her more recent works, a large multimedia installation, is titled Mocion de Orden (Motion of Order).

== Una Milla de Cruces Sobre el Pavimento, A Mile of Crosses on the Pavement (1979) ==
Rosenfeld is best known for her 'art action' entitled Una milla de cruces sobre el pavimento (A Mile of Crosses on the Pavement). Influences of the social reality that frame societies' routines became the physical foundations of her creative interventions. It was begun in Santiago, Chile in 1979. It is one of Rosenfeld's most famous art action pieces. She altered the lines on the pavement, ultimately creating crosses.

With the help of anonymous passersby, she transformed the painted street lines into crosses with a perpendicular axis made of white tape. Rosenfeld used straight lines on the pavement as a metaphor for the tightly held control of the Pinochet regime. By altering these often-used markings, she transgresses this subsystem of control and confronts the public with an unexpected subversion of meaning. By converting the - sign into a +, she challenged the idea that signs are fixed, static markings of meaning. The work itself was a performance piece that disrupted every day traffic under the Pinochet regime.

== Artwork ==
- Una Milla de Cruces Sobre el Pavimento, Art Action/ Video Installation, 1979
- Inversión Escénica [Scenic Investment], Art Action, 1979
- Una Herida Americana, video Instalación, 1982
- White House. Photography, 1982
- Proposición para (entre) Cruzar Espacios Límites, Video Action, 1983
- Valparaiso- Chile, black and white photography, 1985
- Paz para Sebastián Acevedo, Video Art, 1985
- Moneda
- Metro Wall St. – USA
- Cautivos, Video Instalación, 1989
- El Empeño Latinoamericano, Video Projection and Multimedia Installation, 1999
- Moción de Orden, multimedia installation, 2002
- Cuenta Regresiva, multi video proyección, 2006
- Acción de Arte, Allied Checkpoint, 2007
- Estadio Chile, Chile Triennal, 2009

== Publications ==
- Rosenfeld, Lotty, et al. Lotty Rosenfeld: moción de orden. Ocho Libros Editores, 2002.

== Solo exhibitions ==
- 1979/80 Art Action. Una Milla de Cruces Sobre El Pavimiento. Santiago, Chile
- 1981 Art Action: Route 68. Santiago-Valparaíso. Atacama Desert. Copiapó, Chile
- 1982 Art Action: White House. Washington D.D., USA. Santiago Stock Exchange, Chile
- 1983 Art Action: Borders Chile- Argentina. RDA-RFA. Berlin, Germany
- 1984 Art Action: Astronomical Observatory, El Tololo. La Serena, Chile
- 1985 Art Action: Revolution Square in Havana, Cuba. Civic Center of Santiago, Valparaíso Highway. Santiago, Chile
- 1987 Sound Intervention: Courts of Justice of Vancouver, Canada
- 1988 Art Action: Diego Portales. Headquarters of the Military Government. Santiago, Chile

== Exhibitions ==
- 2002 Lotty Rosenfeld: Moción de orden, Museo de Arte Contemporáneo, Santiago (traveled)
- 2007 Documenta 12, Kunsthalle Fridericianum, Kassel, Germany
- 2010-11 Dislocación: Cultural Location and Identity in Times of Globalization, Kunstmuseum Bern (traveled)
- 2013 Lotty Rosenfeld: Por una poética de la rebeldía, Centro Andaluz de Arte Contemporáneo, Seville, Spain
- 2015 Poéticas de la disidencia | Poetics of Dissent, Chilean Pavilion, Biennale Arte 2015, Venice, Italy

== Awards and honors ==
- 1985 Special Jury Prize at the 1st International Video Biennial in Tokyo
- 1993 Andes Foundation Scholarship
- 1995 Chilean Critics Circle National Prize in Visual Arts
- 2001 Paoa Prize, 13th International Film Festival in Viña del Mar
- 2001 Altazor of Engraving and Drawing Prize at las Artes Nacionales
- 2015 Represented Chile in the 56th Venice Biennale along with fellow Chilean artist, Paz Errázuriz

== Museum collections ==
- Museo de Arte Contemporáneo, Santiago
- Museo Nacional Centro de Arte Reina Sofía, Madrid
- TATE Gallery, London
- MOMA, New York

== Bibliography ==
- Brito, María Eugenia. Desacato: Sobre la obra de Lotty Rosenfeld. Santiago: F. Zegers, 1986.
- Castillo, Omar-Pascual, and Francis Naranjo. Cada día es +: Juan Castillo, Lotty Rosenfeld. Las Palmas de Gran Canaria, Spain: Centro Atlántico de Arte Moderno, 2013.
- Diamond, Sara. "Art after the Coup: Interventions by Chilean Women." Fuse 11 (April 1988): 15–24.
- Pottlitzer, Joanne. "Lotty Rosenfeld: Visual Artist." Review: Literature and Arts of the Americas 36, no. 66 (2003): 62–73. Richard, Nelly, ed. Poéticas de la disidencia: Paz Errázuriz— Lotty
- Rosenfeld. Barcelona: Polígrafa, 2015.
- Richard, Nelly, ed. Poéticas de la disidencia: Paz Errázuriz—Lotty Rosenfeld. Barcelona: Polígrafa, 2015.
