= Eon Films =

Mexican film company

Eon Films is a Mexico City-based company that produces and distributes films. It is directed by Miguel Alejandro Reina and owned by a board of directors, including filmmaker César Amigó.

Some of its films are Un aliado en el tiempo (2009) (An ally in time), Seguro de vida (2004) (Life insurance).
