= Diamela Eltit =

Chilean writer and university professor

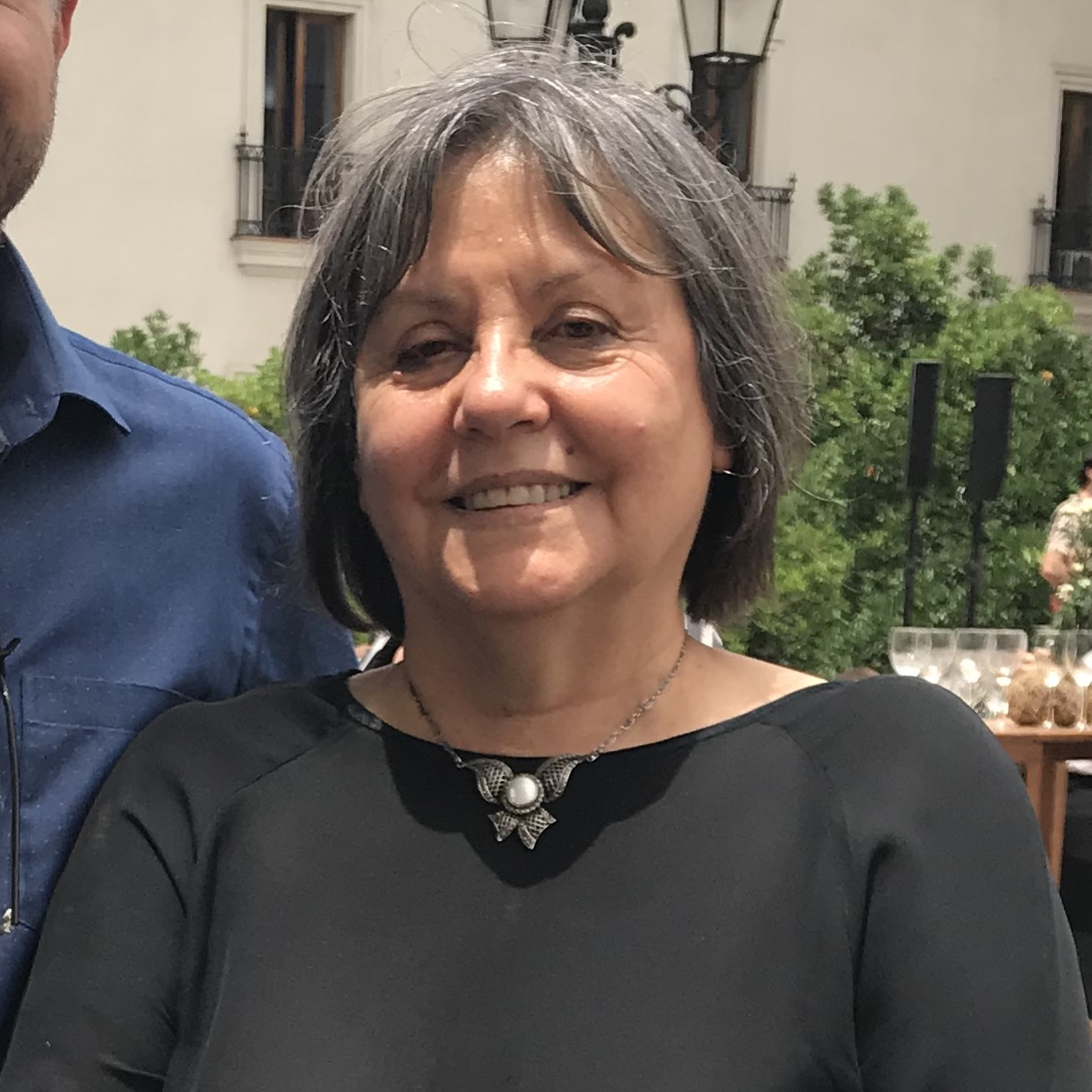
- Diamela Eltit, 2018
- Born: Diamela Eltit González; 1947 (age 78–79); Santiago, Chile
- Education: Universidad Católica de Chile, University of Chile
- Occupations: Poet; Professor
- Spouse: Jorge Arrate
- Children: 3
- Writing career
- Genres: Novella, essay
- Notable awards: Guggenheim Fellowship, 1985; National Prize for Literature (Chile), 2018; Carlos Fuentes Prize, 2020; FIL Award, 2021

Diamela Eltit (Santiago de Chile, 1947) is a Chilean writer and university professor. She is a recipient of the National Prize for Literature.

== Life ==
Diamela Eltit graduated from college from Universidad Católica de Chile and pursued graduate studies in Literature at the Universidad de Chile in Santiago. In 1977, she began a teaching career in public high schools in Santiago, including Instituto Nacional and Liceo Carmela Carvajal. In 1984, she started teaching at universities in Chile, where she is currently professor at the Universidad Tecnológica Metropolitana and abroad.

She has held visiting professorships at the University of California at Berkeley, Johns Hopkins University, Stanford University, Washington University in St. Louis, and University of Pittsburgh, University of Virginia. Since 2007, New York University, she has been a distinguished global visiting professor and teaches at the Creative Writing Program in Spanish. Eltit was the 2014–2015 Simon Bolivar Chair at the Center of Latin American Studies at Cambridge.

In 2013 Princeton University acquired her archive, which includes manuscripts, letters, and photographs.

In 1973, after the military coup in Chile, she started publishing her writings. When democracy returned in 1990 she became a cultural attaché at the Chilean Embassy in Mexico until 1994. She was a representative of the Council of Chilean Universities to the Book National Council. She writes opinions por El Desconcierto, both in Santiago.

In 1979, Eltit created together with the poet Raúl Zurita, the visual artists Lotty Rosenfeld and Juan Castillo and the sociologist Fernando Balcells the Colectivo de Acciones de Arte (CADA), a vanguard group part of the so-called Escena de Avanzada. CADA struggled for reformulating artistic circuits under the Pinochet dictatorship.

In 1980, Eltit published her first book, Una milla de cruces sobre el pavimento, a volume of essays. Her first novel, Lumpérica, appeared in 1983 in Ediciones del Ornitorrinco, a small editorial from Santiago. The text dedicated to Eltit in the internet cultural portal Memoria Chilena, explains that 1980s was complicated for the Chilean intellectuals that had to elaborate strategies to publish and circulate their work in a cultural environment where censorship existed. In this context, women publications were a significant contribution because they generated renewed spaces of thinking on political issues and subjects as sexuality, authoritarianism, domestic life and gender identity. Eltit was part of this new generation and not only articulated an original literary project —a theoretical, esthetic, social and political proposal with a new reading space as perspective—, but also developed a visual work as a member of CADA".

Several of Eltit's novels have been staged by different theater groups and translated into other languages. In 2012 the Spanish editorial house Periférica reached an agreement with Diamela Eltit to republish all her novels.

Three of Eltit novels were chosen as part of the list selected in 2007 by 81 Latin American and Spanish writers and critics for the Colombian journal Semana of the 100 best novels in Spanish language in the last 25 years: Lumpérica (Nº58), El cuarto mundo (Nº67) y Los vigilantes (Nº100). In 2016 the journal Babelia, in Spain, selected one of Eltit's novels as one of the best 25 of century XXI.

Eltit's work has been the object of many studies. Casa de las Américas, in La Habana, dedicated to Eltit her Semana de Autor in 2002, and in 2006, the Universidad Católica de Chile organized the Coloquio Internacional de Escritores y Críticos: Homenaje a Diamela Eltit, which resulted in the book Diamela Eltit: redes locales, redes globales (Iberoamericana, 2009)

Eltit has three children. She is married to Jorge Arrate, lawyer and economist. Her husband is the former president of the Socialist Party. In 2009 he was a presidential candidate representing a coalition between the Communist Party and socialist, humanist and Christian left groups.

== Works ==
- Lumpérica, Novel (Las Ediciones del Ornitorrinco, Santiago, 1983); downloadable from the portal Memoria Chilena; translated into English by Ronald Christ under the title E. Luminata (Lumen Books, 2008, ISBN 978-0930829407)
- Por la patria, Novel (Las Ediciones del Ornitorrinco, Santiago, 1986); downloadable from the portal Memoria Chilena
- El cuarto mundo, Novel (Planeta, Santiago, 1988); translated into English by Dick Gerdes under the title The Fourth World (University of Nebraska Press, 1995, ISBN 9780803267237)
- El padre mío, libro de testimonios (Francisco Zegers, editor, Santiago, 1989); downloadable from the portal Memoria Chilena
- Vaca sagrada, Novel (Planeta, Buenos Aires, 1991); translated into English by Amanda Hopkinson under the title Sacred Cow (Serpent's Tail, 1994, ISBN 9781852422875)
- Elena Caffarena: El derecho a voz, el derecho a voto, Essay (Casa de Chile en México, México, 1993)
- El infarto del alma, libro documental, con fotografías de Paz Errázuriz (1994)
- Los vigilantes, novela (Sudamericana, Santiago, 1994); translated into English by Helen Lane and Ronald Christ under the title Custody of the Eyes (Lumen Books, 2005, ISBN 9780930829568, OCLC 63789755)
- Crónica del sufragio femenino en Chile, Essay, Servicio Nacional de la Mujer SERNAM, Santiago, 1994; descargable desde el portal Memoria Chilena
- Los trabajadores de la muerte, Novel (Seix Barral, Santiago, 1998)
- Emergencias: Escritos sobre literatura, arte y política, Essays (Planeta, Santiago, 2000)
- Mano de obra, Novel (Seix Barral, Santiago, 2002); downloadable from the portal Memoria Chilena
- Puño y letra, sobre Carlos Prats (Seix Barral, Santiago, 2005). Aunque publicado por la editorial como novela, Eltit reconoce que no lo es: "Lo que sí le puedo decir taxativamente es que no es una novela, no lo es, más allá de que la editorial la incluya bajo ese prisma".^{14}
- Jamás el fuego nunca, Novel (Seix Barral, Santiago, 2007)
- Signos vitales, Escritos sobre literatura, arte y política, Essays (Ediciones UDP, Santiago, 2007)
- Colonizadas, relato en la antología Excesos del cuerpo, Ficciones de contagio y enfermedad en América Latina (Eterna Cadencia, Buenos Aires, 2009)
- Impuesto a la carne, Novel (Seix Barral, Santiago / Eterna Cadencia, Buenos Aires, 2010)
- Antología personal, Anthology (Editorial de la Universidad de Talca, 2012)
- Fuerzas especiales, Novel (Seix Barral, Santiago, 2013)
- Réplicas, Escritos sobre literatura, arte y política, Essays (Seix Barral, Santiago, 2016)
- Dos guiones, Plays (Sangría Editora, Santiago, 2017). Incluye los guiones "La invitación, el instructivo" (2006, Mediometraje dirigido por Lotty Rosenfeld e incluido en su instalación "Cuenta regresiva") y "¿Quién viene con Nelson Torres?" (2001)
- Sumar, Novel (Seix Barral, Santiago, 2018)
- El ojo en la mira, Essay/Literary autobiography (Ampersand, Argentina, 2021)
- Falla humana, Novel (Seix Barral, Santiago, 2023)
- Laberintos: Escritos sobre literatura, feminismo y política, Essays (Seix Barral, Santiago, 2024)

== Selected bibliography ==
- Página de Eltit en Memoria Chilena, con fotos, cronología y artículos y libros que se pueden descargar gratuita y legalmente
- Eltit en Letras.s5
- Eltit en Editorial Planeta Chile
- Eltit lee el relato Colonizadas, UNAM, audio 24:51; acceso 23.01.2012
- “La unión madre-hija es la pareja más débil de la cultura”, entrevista a Eltit sobre la novela Impuesto a la carne; portal de la editorial & librería Eterna Cadencia, 02.05.2011; acceso 23.01.2012
- Ezequiel Alemián. Una escritura política y sin anestesia para retratar a América Latina, entrevista con motivo de la publicación de Impuesto a la carne; Clarín, 13.12.2010; acceso 23.01.2012
- Leonidas Morales. Género y Hegemonía en 'El infarto del alma'
- Cortometraje inspirado en El infarto del alma
- Bernardita Llanos Mardones. El sujeto explosionado: Eltit y la geografía del discurso del padre, ensayo sobre El padre mío; Literatura y lingüística Nº10, 1997; acceso 23.01.2012
- Tres novelas (Los vigilantes, El cuarto mundo y Mano de obra) en Google book

== Awards and accolades ==
- Guggenheim Fellowship, 1985
- USA Social Science Research Council Fellowship, 1988, (to research on Gabriela Mistral, María Luisa Bombal and Marta Brunet)
- Prize José Nuez Martín, 1995 por Los vigilantes
- Nominated to Altazor Award 2001 in the category of literary essay with Emergencias. Escritos sobre literatura, arte y política
- Premio José Donoso 2010^{12}
- Nominated to Altazor Award 2011 in the novels category with Impuesto a la carne
- Finalist in the Prize Rómulo Gallegos 2011 with Impuesto a la carne^{13}
- Finalist for the Neustadt International Prize for Literature 2012 (nominated by Nathalie Handal)
- Altazor Award 2014 in the fiction category for Fuerzas especiales
- National Prize for Literature (Chile), 2018
- Carlos Fuentes Prize, 2020
- FIL Award, 2021
