= César A. Amigó =

Mexican film producer, screenwriter, director, cinematographer, and actor

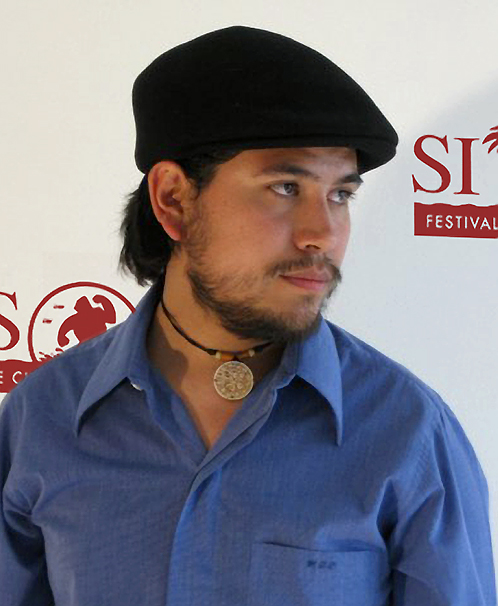
- Amigó at the Sitges Gala in Catalonia, October 10, 2009.
- Born: César Alfredo Amigó Aguilar; August 23, 1981 (age 44); Mexico City, Federal district, Mexico
- Occupations: Film and television producer, director and screenwriter.

César Alfredo "Amigó" Aguilar (born August 23, 1981) is a Mexican film producer, screenwriter, director, cinematographer, actor, and founder of Oscuro Deseo Producciones. He is known as the creator of the film series Serial Comic, and as a screenwriter of the short films Sesiones and the critically acclaimed Un aliado en el tiempo (An ally in time). He is a make-up artist known for his work on Sus satánicas majestades.

== Career ==
Amigó's first job in the movie business came at age 18l He worked as a PA for producer Cecilia Sagredo's Mœnia music video No dices más. During his sophomore college year, he teamed with Miguel A. Reina to write a feature film treatment, which formed the basis for Sesiones. Amigó's first produced short film, which starred Omar Zurita and Mónica Galván. He followed with Mi vida en frenesí, starring Josefina Gómez Maganda, and Reflexiones.

Amigó collaborated with producer Heissel Domínguez on the 2008 film, Un aliado en el tiempo. In 2009, he made his first foray into television with Capadocia, which was broadcast on HBO, serving as the show's co-cinematographer (with Alberto Anaya and Martín Boege). Under his production company, Oscuro Deseo Producciones, Amigó wrote and directed Serial Comic No.1: Fijación, a prelude to film series Serial Comic. He served as make-up artist of Sergio García Michel's Sus satánicas majestades and actor in Sergio Tovar Velarde's Infinito. Amigó has photographed short films for many film directors.

Amigó's unrecognized skill is acting. He contributed to film and TV projects, including Richard Shepard's The Matador, Russell Mulcahy's Resident Evil: Extinction and Pete Travis's Vantage Point, among others.

Amigós worked on Gustavo Alatriste's project Detrás de la luna (Behind the moon).

== Filmography ==
- Las Noches Locas 2 (English: The Crazy Nights 2) (2026) (Producer)
- Las Noches Locas (English: The Crazy Nights) (2021) (Producer)
- Fuera De Señal (2015) (creative Director)
- Plastik Lub (2014) (assistant director)
- Amor Maternal (2014) (assistant director)
- Mexico Barbaro (2014) (assistant director)
- The ABC Of Death (2013) (Casting)
- Cuatro Lunas (2013) (Producer)
- Z: The Definitive Documentary (2011) (director, cinematographer)
- Lucha Verde: Super Verde vs La contaminación (2010) (director, writer)
- Afuera (2010) (assistant director)
- Infinito (2010) (make-up artist)
- Serial Comic No.1: Fijación (2010) (director, writer)
- Seguro de vida (2010) (assistant director, assistant cinematographer)
- Los inadaptados (2010) (actor)
- Sus satánicas majestades (2009) (cinematographer, make-up artist)
- Un pedazo de Guerrero en el D.F. (2009) (producer)
- Siempre fiel (2009) (cinematographer)
- Un aliado en el tiempo (2008) (writer, producer)
- Vantage Point (2008) (actor)
- Reflexiones (2008) (editor)
- Un hermano (2007) (cinematographer)
- Resident Evil: Extinction (2007) (actor)
- Mi vida con frenesí (2007) (cinematographer, editor)
- The Matador (2005) (actor)
- Sesiones (2000) (director, writer)

=== Television ===
- Bitácora Insólita (2016-2018) (productor)
- Capadocia (2009) (cinematographer)
- La vida es una canción (2004) (actor)
- La Heredera (2004) (actor)

=== Music videos ===
- Ursula Kempt's Cobarde (2013) (production assistant)
- Evanoff's Dogma (2013) (production assistant)
- Torre Blanca's Lobo (2012) (production assistant)
- Mœnia's No dices más (1999) (production assistant)
- Mario Mordan's Piensa otra vez (1999) (director, writer)

== Trivia ==
- Has written many horror tales for local competition.
