= Queens International Film Festival =

Former event in Queens, New York

- Location: Queens, New York
- Founded: 2003
- Founded by: Marie Castaldo
- Disestablished: 2010

Queens International Film Festival is a former film festival that was held in Queens, New York City from 2003 to 2009.
