= Oscuro Deseo Producciones =

Oscuro Deseo Producciones is a Mexico City-based company that produces and distributes films. It is directed by César A. Amigó and owned by a board of directors.

Some of its films are the Serial Comic horror film series.

== Filmography ==
Future projects include Serial Comic (2012)

- Serial Comic No.2: Mental (2011)
- Z: The Definitive Documentary (2011)
- Hasta cuando? (2011)
- ¿Quién anda ahí? (2010)
- Lucha Verde: Super Verde vs La contaminación (2010)
- Serial Comic No.1: Fijación (2010)
- Sesiones (2000)
