= Pantalla de Cristal Film Festival =

The Pantalla de Cristal Fest is a major international film festival located in Mexico City. The festival features over two hundred digital films, shorts, musical videoclips, TV spots and documentaries over the course of seven days.

== History ==
The Festival was established in 1999 by José Antonio Fernández, founder of the Mexican film magazine Screen. Eight categories of awards were included in its most recent edition: for feature films, documentaries, short films, video clips, commercials, newspaper reports, corporate videos, television series and miniseries.

== See also ==
- Film festivals in North and Central America
