= Andrés Roemer =

Mexican writer and economist

Andrés Roemer Slomianski
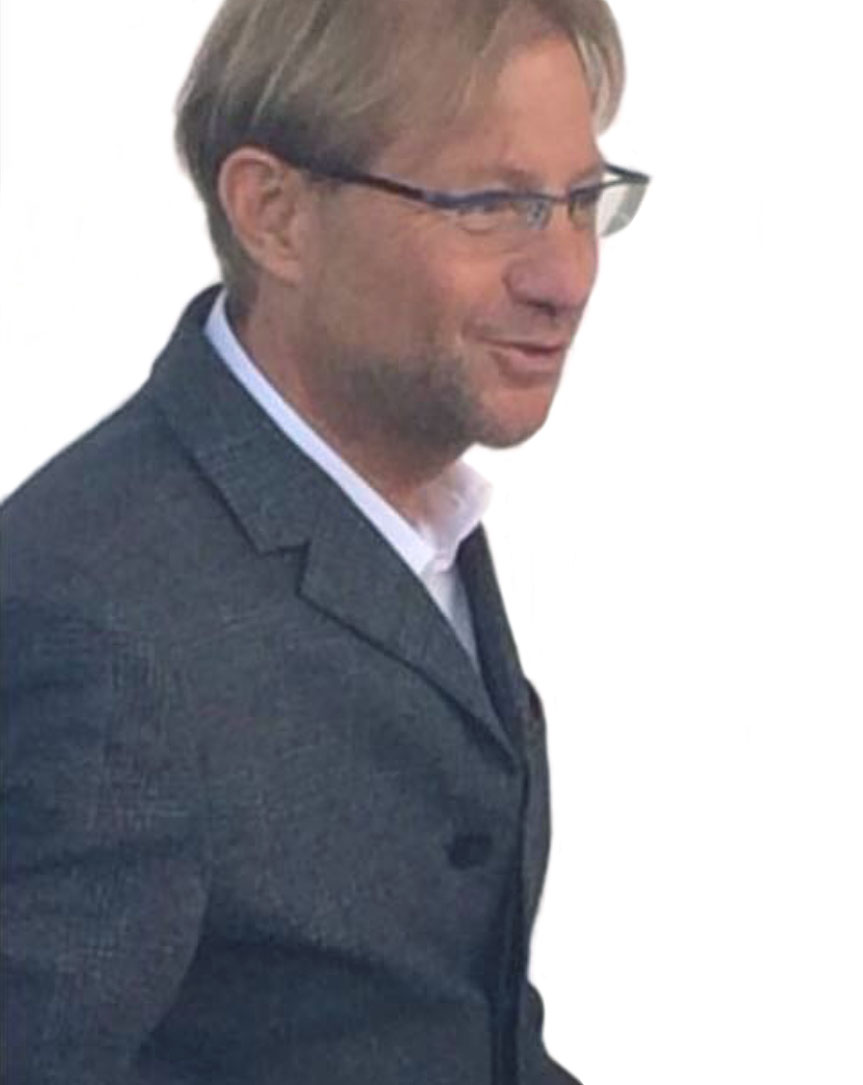
- Born: July 12, 1963 (age 62); Mexico City, Mexico
- Education: University of California, Berkeley; Harvard University; Instituto Tecnológico Autónomo de México; National Autonomous University of Mexico
- Occupations: Diplomat, economist, and lawyer

Andrés Roemer Slomianski (born July 12, 1963) is a Mexican writer, former ambassador to UNESCO, and fugitive.

As of 2021 Andrés Roemer has ceased his collaboration with UNESCO after 61 women accused him of rape and sexual abuse. He is currently under investigation by the Mexican authorities and awaits extradition hearings in Israel.

== Early life and education ==
Roemer is the grandson of orchestra German Jewish conductor Ernst Römer, who emigrated to Mexico in 1938, and grew up in Mexico City.

He completed a BA in economics at the Instituto Tecnológico Autónomo de México (ITAM) in Mexico City (1983 to 1987) and a Bachelor in Law from the National Autonomous University of Mexico (UNAM, 1983–1987). Roemer also has a Ph.D. in public policy (1991 to 1994) from the Goldman School of Public Policy of University of California at Berkeley.

== Career ==
=== Academic positions ===
From 1987 until 2000, Roemer worked as professor at the Instituto Tecnológico Autónomo de México (ITAM). Between 1992 and 1994, he was professor in the Masters in Public Policy between Mexico and the United States at the Goldman School of Public Policy at the University of California, Berkeley. Between 2011 and 2013, he was senior research fellow at the law school at the University of California, Berkeley.

=== Civil service and public appointments ===
Roemer was Mexico's Ambassador to UNESCO based in Paris from 2016. He also served as Consul General of Mexico in San Francisco from 2013 to 2016. From 2010 until 2013, he was a member of the advisory board of the National Human Rights Commission.

Roemer was removed as Mexico's ambassador to UNESCO following his refusal to cast the country's support of the Occupied Palestine Resolution.

== Rape and sexual harassment accusations ==
Andrés Roemer has been accused of rape and sexual harassment by at least sixty-one women, according to the organization Periodistas Unidas Mexicanas (PUM). Most of these women claim to have been harassed or raped with the same modus operandi: Mr. Roemer would meet with them at his home for job interviews, where the assaults would take place. Since 2019, some accusations had been made anonymously, but in February 2021, Mexican dancer Itzel Schnaas decided to make her accusation public and several other accusers followed. In the aftermath of these events, Roemer fled to Israel to avoid criminal charges, where he was again accused of sexual misconduct.

Roemer has denied the abuse allegations of Ms. Schnaas through a publicly released video, but has not commented on accusations made by the other women. Roemer's weekly television show ″De cabeza con Andrés Roemer″ was cancelled on March 7, 2021. Over the same weekend, Roemer's mansion in Colonia Roma was blocked off from the street with large wooden plates. On 5 May 2021, an arrest warrant for the felony of rape was issued by the Attorney General of Mexico.

Roemer was arrested by the Israeli police on 2 October 2023 following the rape and sexual harassment allegations ahead of his planned extradition to Mexico.

== Publications ==
  - Move UP with Clotaire Rapaille. UK: Allen Lane (Penguin Books), 2015. South Korea: Wiseberry, 2016.
  - Oskar and Jack (Oskar y Jack). México: Editorial Miguel Ángel Porrúa, 2011.
  - The Other Einstein (El Otro Einstein). México: Editorial Miguel Ángel Porrúa, 2008.
  - Why Do We Love Football? (¿Por qué amamos el fútbol?) (editor). México: Editorial Miguel Ángel Porrúa, 2008.
  - No: An Imperative From Generation Next (No: Un Imperativo de la Generación Next). México: Editorial Aguilar, 2007.
  - "What to do effectively combat terrorism?" (“¿Qué hacer para combatir eficazmente el terrorismo?”) in The Latin American and Caribbean Journal of Legal Studies, Vol. 1, Issue 1, Article 4, (2007), pp. 1–25.
  - Terrorism and Organized Crime: An Economic and Legislation Focus (Terrorismo y Crimen Organizado: Un Enfoque de Derecho y Economía) (editor). México: Instituto de Investigaciones Jurídicas, UNAM, 2006.
  - Between the Public and the Private: 1300 + 13 Questions to Think about Thinking (Entre lo Público y lo Privado 1300 + 13 Preguntas Para Pensar Sobre Pensar). México: Editorial Noriega, 2005.
  - Happiness: A Law and Economics Focus (Felicidad: Un Enfoque de Derecho y Economía) (editor). México: Instituto de Investigaciones Jurídicas-UNAM, 2005.
  - Enigmas and Paradigms: An Exploration between Art and Public Policy (Enigmas y Paradigmas: Una Exploración entre el Arte y la Política Pública). México: Limusa Editores-ITAM-UIA, 2003.
  - "Philosophy of Law" ("Filosofía del Derecho") in Rodolfo Vázquez and José María Lujambio (Edits.). Contemporary Philosophy of Law in Mexico Testimonys and Perspectives (Filosofía del Derecho Contemporánea en México Testimonios y perspectivas). México: Distribuciones Fontamara, 2002.
  - Crime Economics (Economía del Crimen). México: Limusa Editores, 2000. Roemer, A. (2000). (Likewise, there is a homonym playwright publication by Victor Hugo Rascon Banda [2007], based on Roemer's title).
  - Law and Economics: Revising the Literature (Derecho y Economía: Una revisión de la Literatura) (editor). Prologue by Richard A. Posner. México: FCE- CED, 2000.
  - Coauthored with Esteban Moctezuma Barragán A New Public Management in Mexico: Towards a Government That Produces Results The Political Economy of Latin America (Por un Gobierno con Resultados. El Servicio Civil de Carrera: Un Sistema Integral de Profesionalización, Evaluación y Desempeño de los Servidores Públicos en México) México: FCE, SMGE, CED, Academia Metropolitana, 1999. (Published in English by The London School of Economics-Ashgate Publishers).
  - Sexuality, Law and Public Policy (Sexualidad, Derecho y Políticas Públicas). México: Editorial Porrúa-AMDE-ISSSTE, 1998.
  - Economics and Law: Water Public Policy (Economía y Derecho: Políticas Públicas del Agua). México: Editorial Porrúa-SMGE-CIDE- FCE, 1997.
  - “Answer to Rodolfo Vazquez’s Comments” (“Réplica a los comentarios de Rodolfo Vázquez”) in Isonomy: Law’s Theory and Philosophy Magazine (Isonomía: Revista de Teoría y Filosofía del Derecho), Issue 5 (October 1996), pp. 153–159.
  - The Game of Negotiation (El Juego de la Negociación). México: ITAM, 1994.
  - An Introduction to Economic Analysis in Law (Introducción al Análisis Económico del Derecho). México: FCE-ITAM-SMGE, 1994.
