= Clotaire Rapaille =

French marketing consultant

- Born: Gilbert Clotaire Rapaille; August 5, 1941 (age 85)
- Education: Paris-Sorbonne University (PhD)
- Occupation: Marketing

Gilbert Clotaire Rapaille, known as G. Clotaire Rapaille, is a French marketing consultant and the CEO and founder of Archetype Discoveries Worldwide. Rapaille is also an author, who has published on topics in psychology, marketing, sociology and cultural anthropology.

== Early life and education ==
Rapaille was born in France and immigrated to the United States in the early 80s.

Rapaille attended the Paris Institute of Political Sciences for a degree in Political and Social Sciences, and later went on to receive a PhD in Social Psychology from Paris-Sorbonne University.

== Career ==
In addition to his books, he is known for advising politicians and advertisers on how to influence people's unconscious decision making. Rapaille's work identifies the unstated needs and wants of people in a certain culture or country as cultural archetypes.

Rapaille developed his theory on the brain after working as a psychologist for autistic children and studying Konrad Lorenz theory of Imprints and John Bowlby theory of attachment. This work led him to believe that while children learn a given word and the idea connected with it, they associate it with certain emotions. He called that primal emotional association an imprint. This imprint determines our attitude towards a particular thing. These pooled individual imprints make up a collective cultural unconscious, which unconsciously pre-organize and influence the behavior of a culture.

Rapaille subscribes to the triune brain theory of Paul D. MacLean, which describes three distinct brains: the cortex, limbic, and reptilian. Beneath the cortex, the seat of logic and reason, is the limbic, which houses emotions. Camouflaged underneath those is Rapaille's theorized brain—the reptilian.

Rapaille believes that buying decisions are strongly influenced by the reptilian brain, which is made up of the brain stem and the cerebellum. Only accessible via the subconscious, the reptilian brain is the home of our intrinsic instincts. It programs us for two major things: survival and reproduction. Rapaille proposes that in a three-way battle between the cortical, the limbic (home of emotion) and the reptilian areas, the reptilian always wins, because survival comes first. This theory has become the basis for his thoughts on what a product means to consumers on the most fundamental level.

His theory that culture gets imprinted into the "Reptilian Brain" during early childhood has been heavily contradicted by scientific evidence. His practice of leading managers into regression sessions to tap into their unconscious in an attempt to discover a "code" word, has also been cited as "primitive" and has been heavily contradicted by scientific evidence.

In the opening of his book, 7 Secrets of Marketing, he says, "Cultures, like individuals, have an unconscious. This unconscious is active in each of us, making us do things we might not be aware of." This collective cultural unconscious can be further defined as a pool of shared imprinting experiences that unconsciously pre-organize and influence the behavior of a culture.

Rapaille's claim of technique of "archetype discovery" stems from the psychoanalytic methods pioneered by the Viennese psychologist Ernest Dichter. This technique doesn't ask what people want, but why they want it. These research methods focus on finding what he calls the “code”, the unconscious meaning people give to a particular product, service or relationship. Rapaille posits that sublimated emotional memories occupy a place between each individual's unconscious (Freud) and the collective unconscious of the entire human race (Jung).

Rapaille appeared in a Frontline episode about marketing entitled "The Persuaders", which first aired on November 9, 2004 on PBS in the United States.

== Published works ==
- "The Global Code: How a New Culture of Universal Values Is Reshaping Business and Marketing", 2015
- "Move UP", English edition, Penguin UK, 2015
- "El Verbo De Las Culturas" Taurus, 2015
- The Culture Code, Crown Publishing, 2007
- Rapaille, Clotaire (1 February 2001). Seven Secrets of Marketing in a Multi-Cultural World (First ed.). UT: Executive Excellence. ISBN 9781890009748.

- Rapaille, Clotaire (2004). Seven Secrets of Marketing in a Multi-Cultural World (Second ed.). New York, NY: Tuxedo Productions.

- Rapaille, G. Clotaire (2003). Social Cancer: The Code for Terrorism. New York, NY: Tuxedo Productions. ISBN 9780974016825.
- Versteh' Deine Eltern, Bucher, Munich 1984, in German
- Comprendre Ses Parents Et Ses Grands Parents Marabout, Paris 1982, in French
- Escuchelo: Es Su HijoPomaire, Colección Libre, Barcelona 1981, in Spanish
- Le Trouple Editions Menges, Paris 1980, in French
- Si Vous Ecoutiez Vos Enfants Editions Menges, Paris 1978, in French
- La Communication Créatrice Editions Dialogues, Paris 1976, in French
- Wisdom Of Madness Thomas Jefferson State College, Michigan State University, manuscript, 1975, in English
- La Relation Creatrice Editions Universitaires, Paris 1973, in French
- La Relazione Créatrice Cittadella Editrice, 1975, in Italian
- Laing Editions Universitaires, Paris 1972, in French
- Analyse des Pratiques Medicales et des Croyances Liées a la Maladie et aux Soins Dans Quinze Communautes Cicaraguayennes Thesis Paris, Sorbonne, 1969 (220 pages) in French
