= IBERDOC =

- Type: Open University
- Established: 2009
- Rector: Tatiana Canro Canro
- Location: Santiago de los Caballeros de Mérida, Mérida, Venezuela
- Website: www.iberdoc.org

Escuela Iberoamericana de Cine Documental (Iberoamerican Documentary Film School) or IBERDOC is the first training center in the region devoted exclusively to training Latin American professionals in the documentary genre. It is located in Santiago de los Caballeros de Mérida, state of Mérida, Venezuela. IBERDOC is managed by the Foundation 1000 Metros Bajo Tierra in collaboration with the Spanish initiative for film studies center of the Canary Islands (CECAN), and supported by IBERMEDIA.
