= Fernando Julien =

Mexican footballer (born 1986)

Personal information
- Full name: Fernando Julien Freire
- Date of birth: May 18, 1986 (age 40)
- Place of birth: Mexico City, Mexico
- Height: 1.80 m (5 ft 11 in)
- Position: Forward

Team information
- Current team: Jaguares
- Number: 32

Senior career*
| Years | Team | Apps | (Gls) |
| 2008 | Jaguares | 3 | (1) |
- * Club domestic league appearances and goals as of 25 July 2009

Fernando Julien Freire (born 18 May 1986) is a Mexican professional football forward, who played for Chiapas in Primera División de México.
