= Alfonso Virgen Meza =

Mexican aviator

Alfonso Virgen Meza (August 20, 1889 – January 29, 1975) was a Mexican aviator.
