= Roberto Mangas =

Mexican alpinist

Roberto Mangas (January 17, 1914 – February 11, 1982) was a Mexican alpinist.
