= 2019 Leones Anáhuac Cancún football team =

2019 Leones Anáhuac Cancún football

Conferencia Nacional champion Conferencia Nacional Grupo Sur champion

Conferencia Nacional championship game, W 29–21 vs. Lobos UAdeC
- Conference: Conferencia Nacional
- Grupo Norte
- Record: 10–0 (8–0 Nacional)
- Head coach: Jorge Jiménez Aréchiga (1st season)
- Defensive coordinator: Edgar Torres
- Home stadium: Estadio Coliseo Maya

The 2019 Leones Anáhuac Cancún football team was an American football team that represented the Universidad Anáhuac Cancún in the 2019 ONEFA Liga Mayor season, competing in the second-tier Conferencia Nacional. Led by first-year head coach Jorge Jiménez Aréchiga, the Leones compiled a perfect 10–0 record (8–0 in conference games) and won the Conferencia Nacional championship by defeating the Lobos UAdeC in the Conferencia Nacional championship game. It was the second conference championship in program history (after 2009).

The Leones had the best defense in the conference, allowing just 13.6 points and 256 yards per game in the regular season. They also led the conference (and the country) in scoring with 41.9 points per game and ranked second in the conference with 396.2 yards of total offense per game. Running back Axel Montini led the conference with 799 rushing yards and nine rushing touchdowns in the regular season. The team's other statistical leaders included José Rovirosa with 1,117 passing yards and 10 touchdowns and Leyber Canul with 308 receiving yards.

Jiménez Aréchiga dedicated the season to Mario León, an offensive lineman on the team who died prior to the start of the season. Due to the onset of the COVID-19 pandemic, the team did not receive their championship rings until January 2021.

The team played its home games at the Estadio Coliseo Maya in Cancún, Quintana Roo.

== Offseason ==
The Leones were coming off a season in which they went undefeated in the regular season before losing in the semifinals to the Lobos UAdeC. On 11 November 2018, head coach Marco Martos stepped down from the position after 13 seasons, citing personal reasons. On 24 May 2019, it was announced that offensive coordinator Jorge Jiménez Aréchiga would be promoted to be the team's new head coach. Additionally, athletic director Edgar Torres, who had served as interim coach prior to Jiménez Aréchiga's promotion, remained on the coaching staff as defensive coordinator.

Due to funding issues affecting the football program, the players organized a benefit concert headlined by pop rock band Los Claxons on 24 May at the Plaza de Toros in Cancún to help cover costs for the season, which were reported to amount to around MXN$1.5 million.

== Preseason ==
The Leones opened their preseason in late July with an 11–6 victory at home over the All Blacks, an all-star selection from the Caribbean Football League, in a game dubbed the "Tazón Coliseo Maya".

Jiménez Aréchiga set a clear goal to go undefeated during the 2019 season. An official presentation of the team was held on 4 September, during which new uniforms were unveiled and the 63 players on the roster were assigned their jersey numbers.

Date	Time	Opponent	Site	Result	Source
27 July	5:00 p.m.	All Blacks	Estadio Coliseo Maya; Cancún (Tazón Coliseo Maya)	W 11–6	

== Schedule ==
Date	Time	Opponent	Site	Result	Source
7 September	12:00 p.m.	at Frailes del Tepeyac	Deportivo Venustiano Carranza; Mexico City	W 31–24	
14 September	7:00 p.m.	Toros Salvajes Chapingo	Estadio Coliseo Maya; Cancún	W 53–0	
21 September	7:00 p.m.	Pumas Acatlán	Estadio Coliseo Maya; Cancún	W 44–21	
28 September	1:00 p.m.	at Lobos BUAP	CU BUAP; Puebla	W 27–6	
5 October	7:00 p.m.	Tlahuicas de Morelos	Estadio Coliseo Maya; Cancún	W 1–0 (forfeit)	
12 October	7:00 p.m.	Halcones UV	Estadio Coliseo Maya; Cancún	W 55–6	
19 October	4:00 p.m.	at Leones Negros UdeG	CUCEA; Zapopan	W 52–18	
26 October	6:00 p.m.	at Tecos UAG	Estadio Tres de Marzo; Zapopan	W 31–20	
2 November	7:00 p.m.	Pumas Acatlán	Estadio Coliseo Maya; Cancún (Conferencia Nacional semifinal)	W 20–13	
9 November	7:00 p.m.	Lobos UAdeC	Estadio Coliseo Maya; Cancún (Conferencia Nacional championship game)	W 29–21	
