= 2024 Zorros CETYS Mexicali football team =

Mexican college American football season

2024 Zorros CETYS Mexicali football

Conferencia Nacional champion Conferencia Nacional Grupo Norte champion

Conferencia Nacional championship game, W 24–20 vs. Leones Anáhuac Cancún
- Conference: Conferencia Nacional
- Grupo Norte
- Record: 10–0 (7–0 Nacional)
- Head coach: Luis Cervantes (5th season)
- Captain: Rodolfo Navarro
- Home stadium: La Madriguera

The 2024 Zorros CETYS Mexicali football team was an American football team that represented the Centro de Enseñanza Técnica y Superior (CETYS), Mexicali campus in the 2024 ONEFA Liga Mayor season. The Zorros competed in the second-tier Conferencia Nacional and played their home games at La Madriguera in Mexicali. (Note: The Zorros played one home game at the Estadio Margarita Astiazarán de Fimbres in Tijuana.) They were led by head coach Luis Cervantes in his fifth season since taking over in 2019. (Note: The 2020 ONEFA season was not held due to the COVID-19 pandemic in Mexico.)

The Zorros compiled a perfect 10–0 record (7–0 in conference games) and won the Conferencia Nacional championship by defeating the Leones Anáhuac Cancún in the Conferencia Nacional championship game, thus earning promotion to the top-tier Conferencia 14 Grandes for 2025.

Despite finishing the regular season undefeated with a 7–0 record, the Zorros entered their first playoff game as the underdogs. They defeated the Potros Salvajes UAEM (42–20) in the quarterfinals and the Borregos Salvajes Querétaro (28–19) in the semifinal. The Zorros beat the Leones Anáhuac Cancún, 24–20, in the championship game, earning their first-ever promotion to the top tier of college football in Mexico. It also marked the third conference title in program history, following back-to-back Grupo Libertad titles in the by-then defunct Liga Premier CONADEIP in 2017 and 2018.

Cervantes was named the ONEFA Coach of the Year. Key players on the team included quarterback Miguel Rodríguez and wide receiver Isaac Fernández.

== Offseason ==
=== 2024 LFA draft ===
The 2024 Liga de Fútbol Americano Profesional (LFA) draft was held on 13 January 2024. One Zorros CETYS Mexicali player was selected.

Round	Pick	Player	Position	LFA team	Ref.
4	35	Alonso Pérez-Negrón	OL	Galgos de Tijuana	

=== Recruits ===
The Zorros CETYS Mexicali recruited three players from Calexico High School in nearby Calexico, California. Luis Angelo Alcala, Leo Canchola, and Christian de la Fuente received four-year scholarships and signed their National Letter of Intent on 15 March.

== Schedule ==
Date	Opponent	Site	Result	Source
25 August	at Borregos Salvajes Guadalajara	Fortaleza Azul; Zapopan (preseason scrimmage)	L 20–42	
6 September	Lobos UAdeC	La Madriguera; Mexicali	W 59–14	
20 September	at Cimarrones UABC Tijuana	Estadio Cimarrón; Tijuana (Clásico Baja)	W 62–7	
28 September	at Correcaminos UAT	Estadio Eugenio Alvizo Porras; Ciudad Victoria	W 47–0	
4 October	Potros ITSON	La Madriguera; Mexicali	W 42–35	
12 October	at Indios UACJ	Unidad UACJ; Ciudad Juárez	W 28–21	
19 October	at Búhos IPN	Casco de Santo Tomás; Mexico City	W 28–20	
25 October	Cimarrones UABC Tijuana	Estadio Margarita Astiazarán de Fimbres; Tijuana (Clásico Baja)	W 28–24	
9 September	Potros Salvajes UAEM	La Madriguera; Mexicali (Conferencia Nacional quarterfinal)	W 42–20	
16 September	Borregos Salvajes Querétaro	La Madriguera; Mexicali (Conferencia Nacional semifinal)	W 28–19	
23 September	Leones Anáhuac Cancún	La Madriguera; Mexicali (Conferencia Nacional championship game)	W 24–20	

== Awards and honors ==
Annual Awards
Player	Award	Ceremony	Date Awarded	Ref.
Luis Cervantes	Coach of the Year	Cascos de Oro	29 March 2025	

== Statistics ==
The Zorros CETYS Mexicali gained an average of 210.3 passing yards and 164.6 rushing yards per game in the regular season. On defense, they held opponents to an average of 178.7 passing yards and 84.9 rushing yards per game, with the latter ranking second in the conference.

The Zorros were led on offense by quarterback Miguel Rodríguez, who completed 58 of 110 pass attempts for 992 yards and 10 touchdowns to just two interceptions during the regular season. The team's other statistical leaders included Isaac Fernández with 412 receiving yards and Ángel Chairez, Sebastián Cisneros, and Mariano Torres, each with 184 rushing yards. Additionally, Gael Arévalo led the conference with 969 all-purpose yards (390 kickoff return, 261 punt return, 218 receiving, 100 rushing) while kicker Ramiro Mora ranked second in the conference with 64 points scored.

== Players drafted into the LFA ==
The 2025 LFA draft was held on 1 March 2025, while the supplementary draft (rounds five to 12) was held on 3 March. One Zorros CETYS Mexicali player was selected.

Round	Pick	Player	Position	LFA team	Ref.
10	74	José Dario Medina	OL	Arcángeles de Puebla	
