= Dishon McNary =

American gridiron football player (born 1997)

No. 25 – Caudillos de Chihuahua
- Position: Defensive back
- Roster status: Active
- CFL status: American

Personal information
- Born: October 27, 1997 (age 29); Chicago, Illinois, U. S.
- Listed height: 6 ft 0 in (1.83 m)
- Listed weight: 196 lb (89 kg)

Career information
- High school: East Paulding (Dallas, Georgia)
- College: Independence (2017–18); Central Michigan (2019–2021)

Career history
- 2022: Chicago Bears*
- 2023: Calgary Stampeders*
- 2023: Montreal Alouettes
- 2024: Ottawa Redblacks*
- 2025: Arcángeles de Puebla
- 2026–present: Caudillos de Chihuahua
- * Offseason or practice squad member only

Awards and highlights
- Grey Cup champion (2023); Tazón México champion (IX); Tazón México MVP (IX)
- Stats at CFL.ca

Dishon McNary (born October 27, 1997) is an American professional football defensive back for the Caudillos de Chihuahua of the Liga de Fútbol Americano Profesional (LFA). He played college football for Independence and Central Michigan. McNary has also been a member of the Chicago Bears, Calgary Stampeders, Montreal Alouettes, Ottawa Redblacks, and Arcángeles de Puebla.

== Early life ==
McNary was born on October 27, 1997, in Chicago, Illinois. He attended East Paulding High School in Dallas, Georgia, where he played football.

== College career ==
McNary first attended and played football at Independence Community College, where he played for the 2017 and 2018 football seasons. In 2019, McNary transferred to Central Michigan University and played football there. In his first season there, McNary redshirted and only started one game. McNary started all six games in the shortened 2020 season and was named first-team All-MAC by Pro Football Focus. In 2021, McNary started the season's first four games but missed the remainder due to injury.

== Professional career ==
=== Chicago Bears ===
After going undrafted in the 2022 NFL draft, McNary was signed as an undrafted free agent by the Chicago Bears. He did not make the Bears' roster and was released.

=== Calgary Stampeders ===
On November 29, 2022, McNary was signed by the Calgary Stampeders. However, he was part of the final training camp cuts on June 3, 2023.

=== Montreal Alouettes ===
On September 5, 2023, McNary signed a practice roster agreement with the Montreal Alouettes. He played in the final three regular season games of 2023 where he recorded one special teams tackle. McNary later won the 110th Grey Cup that season with the Alouettes. In the following offseason, he was released on May 15, 2024.

=== Ottawa Redblacks ===
On May 20, 2024, McNary was signed by the Ottawa Redblacks. However, he was part of the final training camp cuts on June 1, 2024.

=== Arcángeles de Puebla ===
In 2025, McNary signed with the Arcángeles de Puebla of the Liga de Fútbol Americano Profesional (LFA).
