= 2021 ONEFA season =

- League: ONEFA
- Duration: 22 October 2021 –
- Teams: 28

Seasons
- 2020 2022

The 2021 ONEFA season was the forty-second season of the Organización Nacional Estudiantil de Fútbol Americano (ONEFA). The season is scheduled began on 22 October 2021. No champion was crowned in the top-tier 14 Grandes Conference while the Lobos UAdeC of the Autonomous University of Coahuila won the second-tier Conferencia Nacional after defeating the Borregos Salvajes Querétaro 13–9 in the final.

== Background ==
=== Previous season ===
The 2020 ONEFA season was cancelled due to the COVID-19 pandemic. This was the first time in the 42-year history of the Organización Nacional Estudiantil de Fútbol Americano (ONEFA) that the highest category of the circuit was not played.

== Teams ==
The 28 teams were allocated as follows:

- 13 teams in the 14 Grandes Conference in two groups
- 6 teams in the Conferencia Nacional
- 7 teams in the Conferencia Sur-Centro in two groups that includes one invitee

The Aztecas UDLAP were supposed to be members of Group 1 of the 14 Grandes Conference, but declined to participate, dropping the number of teams in the top-tier conference to 13 for the season.

=== 14 Grandes ===
Team	City	Venue	Capacity	Head coach
Group 1
Pumas CU	Mexico City	Estadio Olímpico Universitario	72,000	José Luis Canales Rivera
Burros Blancos IPN	Mexico City	Estadio Wilfrido Massieu	13,000	Agustin López
Borregos Guadalajara	Guadalajara	Estadio La Fortaleza Azul	4,000	Ernesto Alfaro
Borregos Toluca	Toluca	Estadio La Congeladora	5,000	Gustavo Tella
Potros Salvajes UAEM	Toluca	Estadio Juan Josafat Pichardo	5,000	Ricardo Jiménez López
Auténticos Tigres UANL	San Nicolás de los Garza	Estadio Gaspar Mass	16,000	Juan Antonio Zamora
Group 2
Pumas Acatlán	Naucalpan	Estadio FES Acatlán	3,000	Horacio García Aponte
Leones Anáhuac Norte	Huixquilucan	Estadio La Cueva del León	5,000	Marco Montes
Águilas Blancas IPN	Mexico City	Estadio Wilfrido Massieu	13,000	Enrique Zárate
Borregos CEM	Atizapán	Estadio Corral de Plástico	15,000	Simón Hernández
Borregos Monterrey	Monterrey	Estadio Borregos	10,057	Carlos Altamirano
Borregos Puebla	Puebla	Estadio Cráter Azul	3,000	Hugo Lira
Linces UVM	Naucalpan	Estadio José Ortega Martínez	3,700	Rodrigo Pérez

== 14 Grandes ==
=== Regular season ===
==== Week One ====
Date	Visiting team	Home team	Site	Result	Attendance
22 October 2021	UDLAP	UANL	Estadio Gaspar Mass · San Nicolás de los Garza		
22 October 2021	UAEM	Toluca	Estadio La Congeladora · Toluca		
23 October 2021	UNAM	Guadalajara	Estadio La Fortaleza Azul · Zapopan		

Date	Bye Week
23 October	IPN
