= Terrance Williams =

American football player (born 1989)

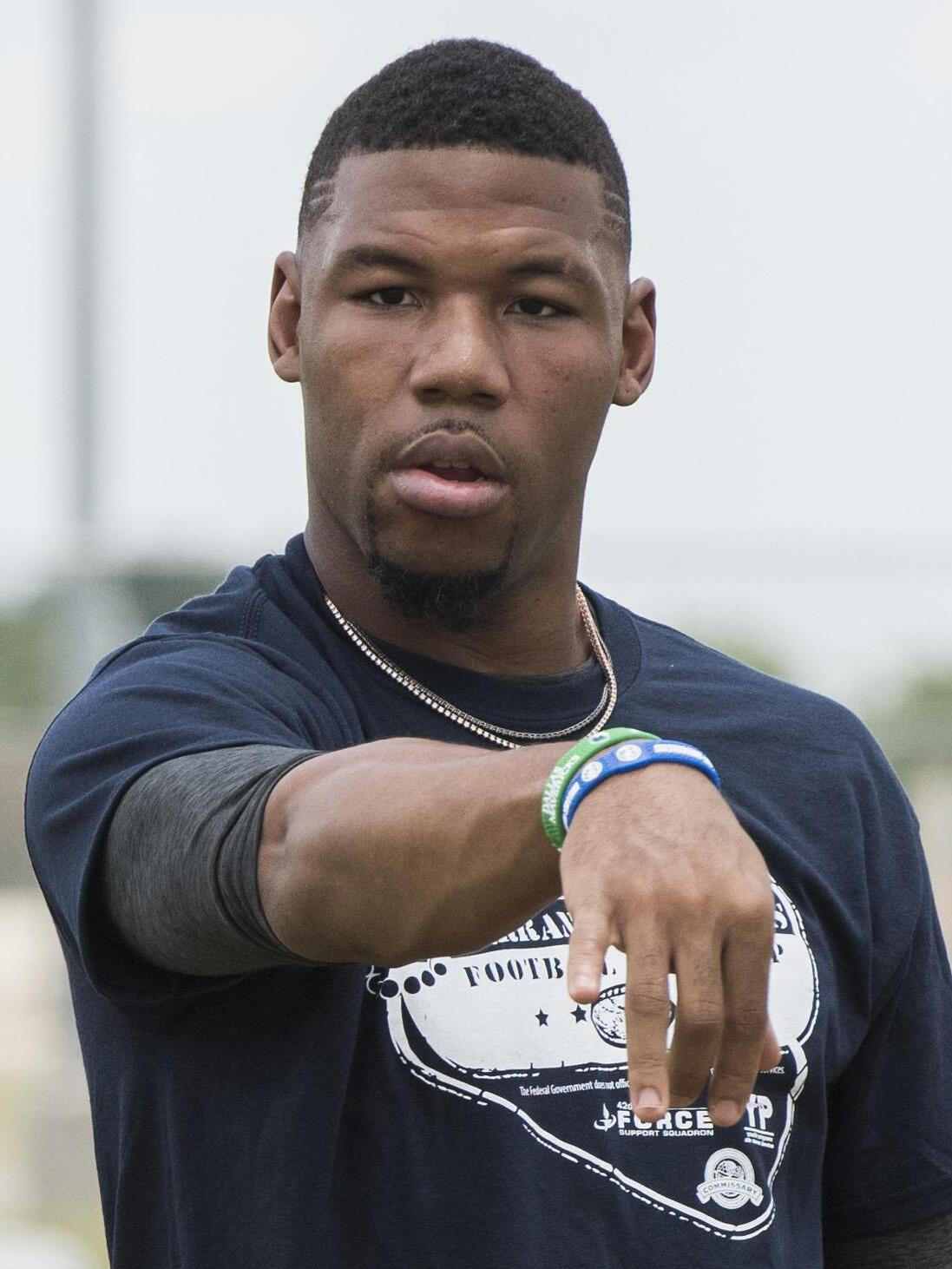
- Williams in 2017

No. 83, 3, 1
- Position: Wide receiver

Personal information
- Born: September 8, 1989 (age 37); Dallas, Texas, U.S.
- Listed height: 6 ft 2 in (1.88 m)
- Listed weight: 210 lb (95 kg)

Career information
- High school: W. T. White (Dallas)
- College: Baylor (2008–2012)
- NFL draft: 2013: 3rd round, 74th overall pick

Career history
- Dallas Cowboys (2013–2018); St. Louis BattleHawks (2020)*; Massachusetts Pirates (2021); Ottawa Redblacks (2021); FCF Zappers (2022); Galgos de Tijuana (2023); Dinos de Saltillo (2026–present)
- * Offseason or practice squad member only

Awards and highlights
- Unanimous All-American (2012); First-team All-Big 12 (2012)

Career NFL statistics
- Receptions: 232
- Receiving yards: 3,377
- Receiving touchdowns: 20
- Stats at Pro Football Reference

Terrance Tyrone Williams (born September 8, 1989) is an American professional football wide receiver for the Dinos de Saltillo of the Liga de Fútbol Americano Profesional (LFA). He played college football for the Baylor Bears, earning unanimous All-American honors in 2012. Williams was selected by the Dallas Cowboys in the third round of the 2013 NFL draft and played six seasons with the Cowboys.

== Early life ==
Williams was born in Highland Hills, Dallas. He attended W. T. White High School in Dallas and played for the White Longhorns high school football team. As a senior, Williams had 59 receptions for 972 yards and eight touchdowns. Considered a two-star recruit by Rivals.com, he accepted a scholarship to Baylor over an offer from Colorado State.

== College career ==
Williams attended Baylor University, where he played for the Baylor Bears football team from 2008 to 2012. During his college career, Williams had 202 receptions for 3,334 yards and 27 touchdowns. Williams was also a Biletnikoff Award finalist for 2011. In 2012, Williams led the nation with 1,832 receiving yards.

== Professional career ==
Pre-draft measurables
Height	Weight	Arm length	Hand span	40-yard dash	10-yard split	20-yard split	20-yard shuttle	Three-cone drill	Vertical jump	Broad jump	Bench press
6 ft 2 in (1.88 m)	208 lb (94 kg)	31 1/4 in (0.79 m)	8 3/4 in (0.22 m)	4.52 s	1.57 s	2.53 s	4.32 s	7.01 s	32.5 in (0.83 m)	9 ft 11 in (3.02 m)	11 reps
All values from NFL Combine.

=== Dallas Cowboys ===
==== 2013 season ====
In the 2013 NFL draft, the Dallas Cowboys traded down in the first round with the San Francisco 49ers, in exchange for a third round pick that the team used to select Williams with the 74th overall pick.

Williams struggled in training camp adjusting to the team's offense, but by the end of the preseason, he had supplanted Dwayne Harris as the third wide receiver. Williams again struggled at the start of the regular season with his route running and dropped passes, until the fourth game against the San Diego Chargers, where he started in place of an injured Miles Austin and registered seven receptions for 71 yards, but also had a critical fumble trying to extend for a touchdown in the last minutes of the 30–21 road loss. Williams started in the next game against the Denver Broncos, catching four passes for 151 yards and a touchdown in the narrow 51–48 loss. By Week 8 against the Detroit Lions, Williams set a Cowboys franchise record for rookies, with a touchdown in his fourth consecutive game. He returned to his third receiver position in Week 12 against the New York Giants and also started returning kickoffs in place of an injured Harris.

Williams finished his rookie season with 44 receptions for 736 yards (16.7 average) and five touchdowns in 16 games and eight starts. At the time, his totals ranked fourth for most receptions, most receiving yards, and most receiving touchdowns by a rookie in franchise history.

==== 2014 season ====
Williams started the year looking to improve on a productive rookie campaign, immediately establishing himself as a legitimate No. 2 wideout and deep threat opposite Dez Bryant by catching six touchdowns in the first seven weeks. After a strong start to his season that included a critical first down reception in a Week 6 30–23 road victory over the Seattle Seahawks, Williams slowed down catching only two touchdowns in the remaining 10 weeks, finishing the season with 37 receptions for 621 yards and eight touchdowns in 16 games and starts.

During the first playoff game of the Cowboys' season and his career, Williams once again solidified his status as a playmaker by registering three receptions for 92 yards, while scoring two critical touchdowns against the Detroit Lions and their No. 2 ranked defense. This included a 76-yard catch-and-run in which he caught a 14-yard pass on a slant route and ran through four defenders en route to a 76-yard touchdown as well as the game-winning eight-yard score. Dallas won the game 24–20. In the Divisional Round against the Green Bay Packers, Williams drew a pass interference in the first quarter that led to a touchdown and also scored on a 38-yard touchdown reception, but he was a non-factor in the second half of the game. The Cowboys lost on the road by a score of 26–21.

==== 2015 season ====
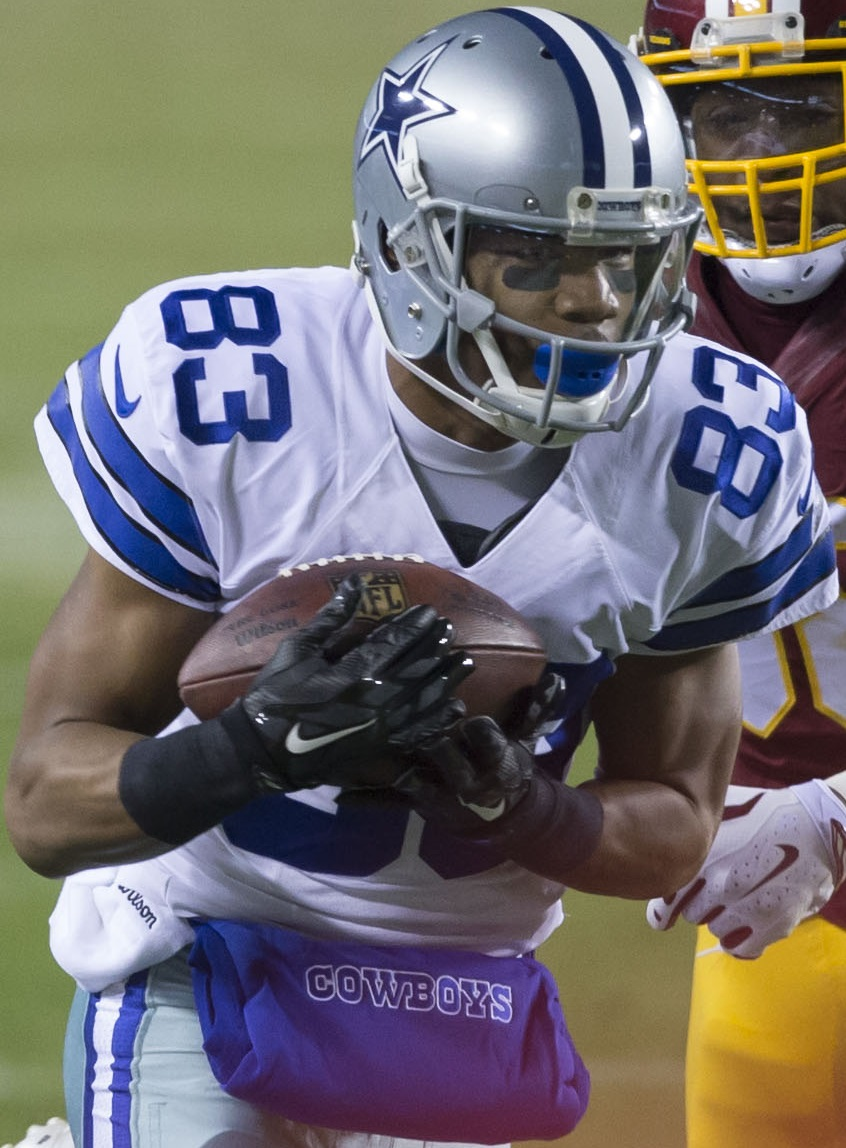
Williams in 2015

With leading wide receiver Dez Bryant missing most of the season, Williams failed to show that he was ready to be a number one receiver, which was complicated by the fact that Williams played with four different starting quarterbacks with varying degrees of knowledge of the team's offense.

Williams had a career-game statistically in the regular-season finale against the Washington Redskins, making eight receptions for 173 yards during a 34–23 loss with Kellen Moore as the starting quarterback. Williams had only two games where he registered over 80 receiving yards and finished the season with 52 receptions for 840 yards and three touchdowns in 16 games and 13 starts.

==== 2016 season ====
During the season-opener against the Giants, Williams caught the ball near the end of the game but did not run out of bounds, allowing the Giants to narrowly win 20–19. He finished the game with three receptions for 34 yards. Three weeks later, Williams caught four passes for 44 yards and his first touchdown of the season against the San Francisco 49ers in a 24–17 road victory. In the regular-season finale against the Philadelphia Eagles, Williams caught a three-yard touchdown in what would prove to be the final play of Tony Romo's career. Williams finished the 27–13 road loss with three receptions for 33 yards and the aforementioned touchdown.

Williams finished the season with 44 receptions for 594 yards and four touchdowns in 16 games and starts. In the Divisional Round against the Packers, Williams had four receptions for 68 yards as the Cowboys lost 34–31.

==== 2017 season ====
On March 10, 2017, Williams signed a four-year, $17 million contract extension with the Cowboys.

During a Week 9 28–17 victory over the Kansas City Chiefs, Williams had his best game of the season, catching nine passes for 141 yards. Williams finished the season with a career-high 53 receptions for 568 yards in 16 games and 14 starts.

==== 2018 season ====
Williams was limited during training camp while recovering from offseason foot surgery.

Williams played in the first three games of the season before aggravating the foot injury. He was placed on injured reserve on October 6, 2018. On October 18, Williams was suspended for three games by the NFL for breaking the substance abuse policy.

On February 18, 2019, the Cowboys declined the option on the final year on Williams' contract, making him a free agent at the start of the new league year.

=== St. Louis BattleHawks ===
In October 2019, Williams was selected by the St. Louis BattleHawks in the 2020 XFL Supplemental Draft. He was waived during final roster cuts on January 22, 2020.

=== Massachusetts Pirates ===
Williams signed with the Massachusetts Pirates of the Indoor Football League (IFL) in April 2021.

=== Ottawa Redblacks ===
The Ottawa Redblacks of the Canadian Football League (CFL) announced that Williams had signed with the team on September 13, 2021, but was released on October 8.

=== Fan Controlled Football ===
On March 13, 2022, Williams was selected by the Knights of Degen in the seventh round of the first FCF draft of the second season. He made his debut against the Bored Ape FC on March 16, recording a completed two-point conversion and a nine-yard reception. Through the weekly draft, Willams was selected by the Zappers. At 0–4, Willams helped propel the team to their first win of the season, connecting on his third touchdown catch of the season from Johnny Manziel.

=== Galgos de Tijuana ===
On January 17, 2023, Williams signed with the Galgos de Tijuana of the Mexican Liga de Fútbol Americano Profesional (LFA) ahead of the 2023 LFA season. He recorded 679 receiving yards and four touchdowns in 10 regular season games.

=== Dinos de Saltillo ===
Williams signed with the Dinos de Saltillo of the LFA ahead of the 2026 LFA season.

== NFL career statistics ==
=== Regular season ===
Year	Team	Games		Receiving					Rushing					Fumbles	
Year	Team	GP	GS	Rec	Yds	Avg	Lng	TD	Att	Yds	Avg	Lng	TD	Fum	Lost
2013	DAL	16	8	44	736	16.7	82	5	3	4	1.3	5	0	2	2
2014	DAL	16	16	37	621	16.8	51	8	0	0	0	0	0	0	0
2015	DAL	16	13	52	840	16.2	42	3	0	0	0	0	0	0	0
2016	DAL	16	16	44	594	13.5	47	4	0	0	0	0	0	1	1
2017	DAL	16	14	53	568	10.7	56	0	2	15	7.5	9	0	0	0
2018	DAL	3	2	2	18	9.0	12	0	0	0	0	0	0	0	0
Career		83	68	232	3,377	14.6	82	20	5	19	3.8	9	0	3	3

=== Postseason ===
Year	Team	Games		Receiving					Rushing					Fumbles	
Year	Team	GP	GS	Rec	Yds	Avg	Lng	TD	Att	Yds	Avg	Lng	TD	Fum	Lost
2014	DAL	2	2	4	130	32.5	76	3	0	0	0	0	0	0	0
2016	DAL	1	1	4	68	17.0	24	0	0	0	0	0	0	0	0
Career		3	3	8	198	24.8	76	3	0	0	0.0	0	0	0	0

== Legal issues ==
On May 19, 2018, Williams was arrested in Frisco, Texas, on suspicion of misdemeanor public intoxication after his car was found crashed into a light pole. Williams was later released on bond. On August 1, public intoxication charges were dismissed after he completed a state-mandated Alcohol Awareness Education course.

== See also ==
- List of NCAA major college football yearly receiving leaders
