= Tiburones de Cancún =

Mexican American football team

Logo

General information
- Founded: 2020; 6 years ago
- Folded: September 2022; 3 years ago
- Stadium: Estadio Andrés Quintana Roo; Estadio Coliseo Maya; Estadio Cancún 86
- Headquartered: Cancún, Quintana Roo
- Colors: Aqua, light grey, white and black

Personnel
- Owner: Andrés Baños

League / conference affiliations
- Fútbol Americano de México; 2022

The Tiburones de Cancún (English: Cancún Sharks) were an American football team based in Cancún, Quintana Roo, Mexico. The Tiburones competed in Fútbol Americano de México (FAM) for a single season in 2022, finishing with a league-worst 1–7 record, before the league folded in September 2022. The team played its home games at three different stadiums: the Estadio Andrés Quintana Roo, the Estadio Coliseo Maya and the Estadio Cancún 86.

== History ==
=== Beginnings ===
In early 2020, it was announced that the team was approved as an expansion team in Fútbol Americano de México (FAM) for its 2021 season, with Andrés Baños as its CEO. The project was undertaken by a consortium of local businessmen, along with municipal and state authorities, commemorating the 50th anniversary of the seaside resort of Cancún, Quintana Roo. The team became the first professional American football team to play in the state of Quintana Roo.

Roberto Aparicio was announced as the Tiburones' first head coach. The team held tryouts in November 2020 in search of local talent, with around 70 players attending. They also signed former Borregos Salvajes Monterrey standout Máximo González, who participated in the National Football League (NFL) International Player Pathway Program, as well as former New Orleans Saints running back Khiry Robinson. However, González left the team in February 2021 to play with the Győr Sharks in Hungary, and Aparicio announced his resignation soon afterward due to disagreements with the team owner over the direction of the project. A number of star players, such as David Casarrubias, Alejandro García and Humberto Noriega, decided to follow González's lead and leave the team over a perceived failure by the front office to deliver on promises made.

Roberto "Gato" Silva was hired in March to replace Aparicio as the Tiburones' new head coach, but the 2021 FAM season was ultimately canceled due to the COVID-19 pandemic.

=== 2022 season ===
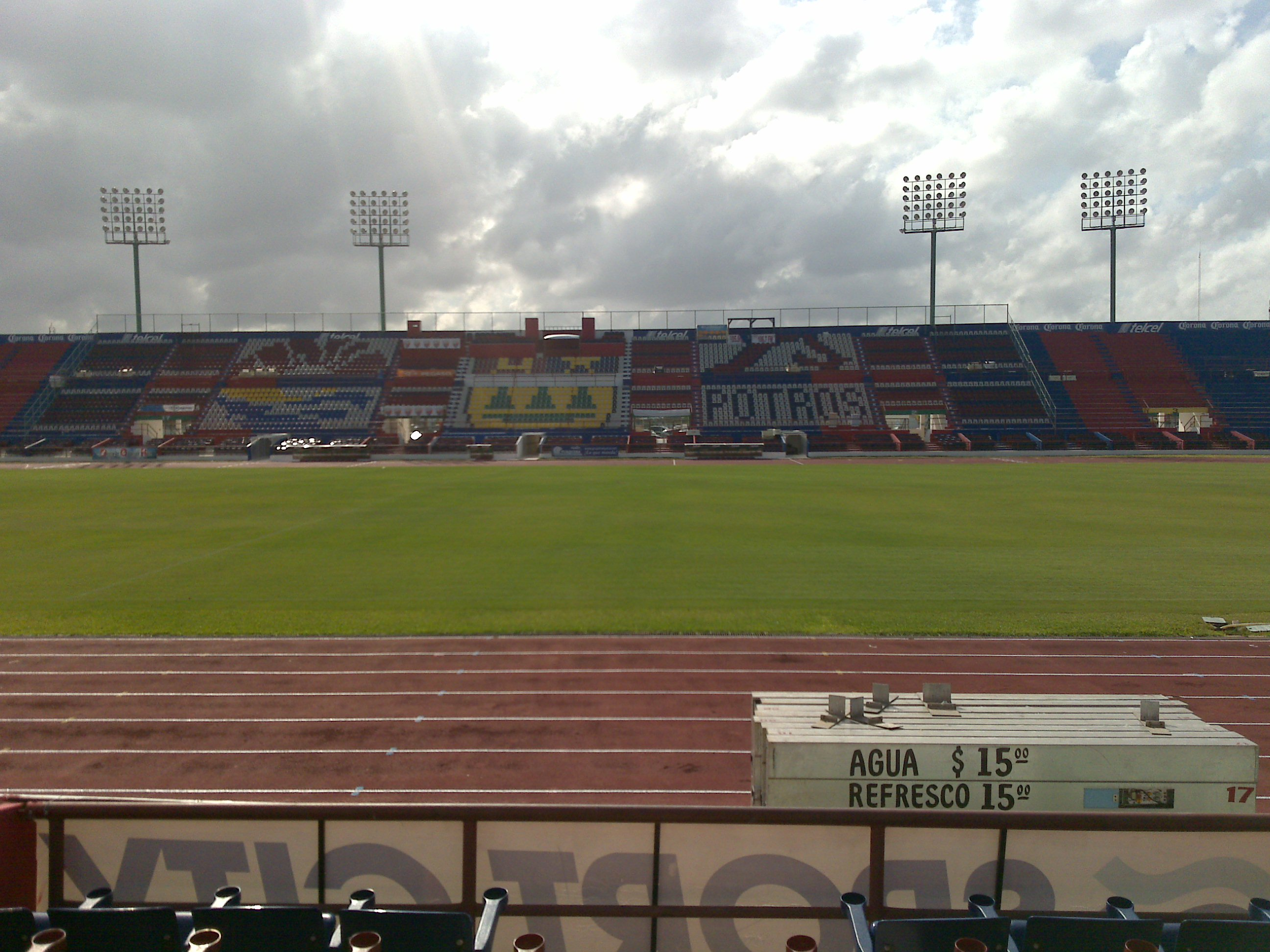
The Tiburones played their home opener at the Estadio Andrés Quintana Roo.

The Tiburones hired Alejandro Evangelista as head coach for the 2022 season and held local tryouts in December 2021. The team signed American quarterback Clark Hazlett, who had previously joined the team in 2021 for training camp before the cancellation of the season. Additionally, they signed four players with NFL experience: Khiry Robinson, Mardy Gilyard, Monte Taylor and David Gilbert. On 18 April, the Tiburones released their final 48-man roster, which included 13 foreign players.

The Tiburones played their first game on 30 April against the defending league champions, the Pioneros de Querétaro. Hazlett threw the team's first-ever touchdown to JD Crandall in the first quarter, but the Tiburones suffered a 21–12 defeat to start their season. After a bye week, the Tiburones hosted the Tequileros de Jalisco in their home opener at the Estadio Andrés Quintana Roo and earned a 20–14 victory – the first in franchise history. Despite this, head coach Alejandro Evangelista unexpectedly announced his resignation after only two games due to disagreements with the front office, and defensive coordinator Édgar Torres was named the interim head coach. Four players left the team as well. In their next game, the Tiburones were shutout 38–0 by the Parrilleros de Monterrey, who were led by former Auburn quarterback Jeremy Johnson.

Ahead of their week 5 matchup against the Rojos CDMX, the Tiburones' foreign players did not practice due to unpaid wages, and rumors circulated that the players were considering a boycott of the game. Although the players ended up taking the field against the Rojos, the team suffered a 42–14 defeat. Instead of playing at the Estadio Andrés Quintana Roo, the Tiburones had to host their rivals at the Estadio Coliseo Maya, the home stadium of the Leones Anáhuac Cancún college team, causing even more uncertainty among the local fan base. The team then traded their American quarterback, Clark Hazlett, to the Tequileros de Jalisco.

In order to save on hotel accommodations, the Tiburones front office decided to fly the team to the city of Chihuahua on the morning of their week 6 matchup against the Caudillos de Chihuahua. Consequently, the Tiburones suffered the largest blowout in FAM history, losing 62–0 as more reports emerged of unpaid wages to players and coaching staff. Team owner Andrés Baños and sporting director Luis Tello continually refused to publicly address their troubles, drawing ire from local media.

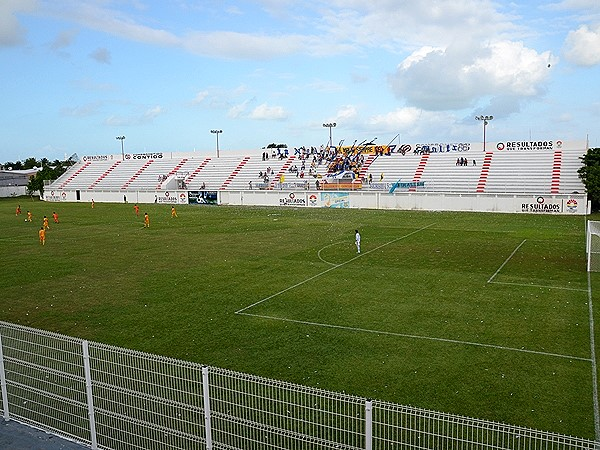
The Tiburones played their final two home games at the Estadio Cancún 86, marking their third different home stadium of the season.

In week 7, the Tiburones hosted the last-placed Bulldogs de Naucalpan at the Estadio Cancún 86, their third "home" stadium in as many home games. The Tiburones lost 14–28, giving the Bulldogs their first win of the season. The following week, the Tiburones suffered their fifth consecutive loss, a 40–14 defeat at the hands of the Jefes de Ciudad Juárez. The Tiburones closed their season at home at the Estadio Cancún 86 with a 35–26 loss to the Cabo Marlins.

The team finished the 2022 FAM season in last place with a 1–7 record, losing their final six games and failing to qualify for the playoffs. They had the worst offense in the league, scoring just 98 points, as well as the worst defense, giving up 280 points. FAM shut down its operations in September 2022 due to financial struggles. Three FAM teams joined the rival league, the Liga de Fútbol Americano Profesional (LFA), for the following season. However, the Tiburones were left without a league.

== Season-by-season ==
Season	Head coach	Regular season				Postseason			
Season	Head coach	Won	Lost	Win %	Finish	Won	Lost	Win %	Result
2021	Roberto Aparicio; Roberto Silva	Season canceled due to the COVID-19 pandemic							
2022	Alejandro Evangelista; Édgar Torres	1	7	.125	9th	Did not qualify			
