= 2026 LFA season =

- Duration: 9 April – 23 May
- Teams: 7

Tazón México IX
- Date: 7 June
- Venue: Estadio Universitario UACH, Chihuahua City
- Champions: Caudillos de Chihuahua

Seasons
- 2025 2027

The 2026 LFA season was the 11th season of operation (10th season of play) of the Liga de Fútbol Americano Profesional (LFA), the top American football league in Mexico. The regular season began on 9 April and ended on 23 May, with the playoffs beginning on 30 May and ending with the Tazón México IX, the league's championship game, on 7 June.

The Caudillos de Chihuahua defeated the Osos de Monterrey in Tazón México IX, becoming the first team to win three Tazón México championships.

== Preseason events ==
=== Draft ===
The LFA draft was held on 17 January. The first three rounds were held in person in Mexico City, while the latter five were held virtually. The Reyes de Jalisco selected Joseph Cortés from ITESM Puebla with the first overall pick.

==== Player selections ====
2026 LFA draft
Rnd.	Pick No.	LFA Team	Player	Pos.	School
1	1	Reyes	Joseph Cortés	DL	ITESM Puebla
1	2	Gallos Negros	Roberto Villalón	OL	UDLAP
1	3	Raptors	Daniel Díaz	WR	UVM
1	4	Dinos	Steven Zambrano	OL	ITESM Monterrey
1	5	Caudillos	Alonso Meraz	DB	ITESM CEM
1	6	Osos	Pablo Treviño	DE	UANL
1	7	Mexicas	Jonathan Castañeda	WR	ITESM CEM
2	8	Reyes	Damián Cruz	OL	UACH
2	9	Gallos Negros	Mariano Hernández	DL	UNAM
2	10	Gallos Negros	Alí Flores	RB	UDLAP
2	11	Dinos	Sergio Reséndiz	QB	UANL
2	12	Mexicas	Diego Rodríguez	OL	Anáhuac Norte
2	13	Osos	Óscar Soto	DL	ITESM Monterrey
2	14	Mexicas	Luis Reyes	OL	IPN (Águilas Blancas)
3	15	Osos	Eduardo Martínez	RB	UANL
3	16	Gallos Negros	Alan Herrera	QB/WR/K	IPN (Águilas Blancas)
3	17	Raptors	Erick Andrade	FS	FES Acatlán
3	18	Reyes	Renato Ávila	DT	FES Acatlán
3	19	Caudillos	Benjamín Huez	DE	UANL
3	20	Dinos	Vinicio García	WR	UANL
3	21	Mexicas	Carlos Navarrete	DL	ITESM CEM
4	22	Reyes	Axel Medina	QB	IPN (Burros Blancos)
4	23	Gallos Negros	Emiliano Jiménez	LB	ITESM Querétaro
4	24	Raptors	Felipe Borjas	DL	ITESM CEM
4	25	Dinos	Brian Lezama	OL	UAdeC
4	26	Caudillos	José Limón	WR	UACH
4	27	Osos	Alejandro Rodríguez	DT	UANL
4	28	Osos	Edwyn Cabello	CB	UANL
4	29	Osos	Luis Olvera	WR	UANL
5	30	Reyes	Víctor Mellado	LB	ITESM Puebla
5	31	Gallos Negros	Octavio García	DL	Anáhuac Querétaro
5	32	Raptors	Gerardo Barocio	QB/WR	IPN (Búhos)
5	33	Dinos	Isaac Briones	WR	UAdeC
5	34	Caudillos	Armando Guerrero	DB	ITESM Puebla
5	35	Mexicas	Irving Robles	FS	IPN (Burros Blancos)
5	36	Gallos Negros	Andrés Tovar	WR	Anáhuac Cancún
6	37	Reyes	Gustavo Olivares	OL	IPN (Búhos)
6	38	Gallos Negros	Orlando Pérez	OL	FES Acatlán
6	39	Raptors	Jesús Alcalá	RB	IPN (Águilas Blancas)
6	40	Dinos	Ángel Carrizales	OL	UAdeC
6	41	Caudillos	Mauricio Martínez	LB	ITESM Monterrey
6	42	Mexicas	Samuel Flores	LB	UNAM
6	43	Mexicas	Alonso Guerrero	DL	UNAM
7	44	Reyes	Elías Montini	LB	Anáhuac Cancún
7	45	Raptors	Isaac Ávalos	OL	Tepeyac
7	46	Dinos	Reynaldo Blanco	K	UANL
7	47	Mexicas	Maximiliano García	DL	Anáhuac Norte
7	48	Mexicas	Emilio Méndez	WR	IPN (Burros Blancos)
8	49	Reyes	Daniel Canales	OL	ITESM Monterrey
8	50	Raptors	Rogelio Aranda	OL	IPN (Burros Blancos)
8	51	Dinos	Jonathan Montes	DT	UANL
8	52	Mexicas	Patricio Santisteban	DB	ITESM Monterrey
8	53	Mexicas	Arath Ríos	RB	UVM
8	54	Dinos	Rodrigo Motte	OL	UDLAP

=== Team changes ===
The Arcángeles de Puebla were unexpectedly absent from the draft. Days later, it was revealed that the team had been excluded from the draft due to disagreements with the new LFA leadership, but that Puebla would remain in the league. Despite reports of the Arcángeles submitting the proper documentation, they were ultimately excluded from the 2026 season schedule, which was released on 12 February. The team claimed that the LFA demanded that they cede 90% of the team's shares, even after they paid MXN$2.3 million in outstanding debts under threat of expulsion. The magazine Proceso called it an "extortion".

A press release from the Arcángeles stated: "[T]hey failed to take control of the team from us. However, they seek to take control of the location with the intention of returning to Puebla in 2027, ignoring the work, history, and effort already built". 32 of the team's players were later reassigned to the remaining seven teams via dispersal draft.

Meanwhile, the Galgos de Tijuana took the 2025 season off and planned to return in 2026. However, this did not materialize, leaving the league with seven teams for the season.

== Teams ==
=== Stadiums, locations and personnel ===
Team	Location	Stadium	Capacity	Head coach
Caudillos	Chihuahua City, Chihuahua	Estadio Olímpico de la UACH	22,000	(Mexico) Federico Landeros
Dinos	Saltillo, Coahuila	Estadio Jorge A. Castro Medina	3,476	(Mexico) Javier Adame
Gallos Negros	Querétaro City, Querétaro	Estadio Olímpico de Querétaro	4,600	(Mexico) Raúl Herrera
Mexicas	Tlalpan, Mexico City	ITESM CCM	2,500	(Mexico) Félix Buendía
Osos	Monterrey, Nuevo León	Estadio Banorte	10,057	(Mexico) Jorge Valdéz
Raptors	Atizapán de Zaragoza, State of Mexico	Club Comanches	1,500	(Mexico) Horacio García
Reyes	Guadalajara, Jalisco	La Fortaleza Azul	3,500	(Mexico) Willy Valdovinos

Locations of the 2024 LFA teams
Greater Mexico City LFA teams

=== Coaching changes ===
Pre-season
Team	Departing Coach	New Coach	Reference
Reyes	Mauricio Salas	Willy Valdovinos	

In-season
Team	Departing Coach	New Coach	Date	Reference
Gallos Negros	Carlos Strevel	Raúl Herrera	15 April	

== Regular season ==
=== Standings ===
Note: GP = Games played, W = Wins, L = Losses, PF = Points For, PA = Points against

Liga de Fútbol Americano Profesional
Pos	Team	GP	W	L	PF	PA	Stk	Qualification
1	Caudillos	6	5	1	187	91	L1	Advance to Semi-finals
2	Osos	6	5	1	169	102	W4	Advance to Semi-finals
3	Dinos	6	4	2	159	127	W1	Advance to Semi-finals
4	Raptors	6	3	3	145	158	L1	Advance to Semi-finals
5	Reyes	6	2	4	117	119	L1	
6	Gallos Negros	6	1	5	89	158	L3	
7	Mexicas	6	1	5	76	187	W1	
Tiebreakers
1. Head-to-head; 2. Average between points scored and points against 3. Points against 4. Best net points in common games 5. Best net points in all games 6. Coin toss

Source: LFA

== Playoffs ==
Semifinals; 30 May
1	Caudillos	25
4	Raptors	23
2	Osos	33
3	Dinos	5

Tazón México IX; 7 June
1	Caudillos	24
2	Osos	12

== Tazón México IX ==
Tazón México IX
Osos de Monterrey (5–1)	Caudillos de Chihuahua (5–1)
12	24
Head coach: Jorge Valdéz	Head coach: Federico Landeros
- Date: 7 June 2026
- Kickoff time: 7:00 p.m. CST (UTC-6)
- Stadium: Estadio Universitario UACH; Chihuahua City
- MVP: Dishon McNary, cornerback

TV in the United States
- Network: ESPN2 (Mexico); Disney+ (Mexico); Telemundo Deportes (U.S.); Peacock (U.S.)
- Announcers: Javier Trejo Garay (play-by-play) Pablo Viruega, Mauricio "Tyson" López and Emilio León (analysts) Karen Tapia, Mafer Leyva (sideline reporters)

Tazón México IX was held on 7 June at the Estadio Universitario UACH in Chihuahua City.

The Caudillos de Chihuahua defeated the Osos de Monterrey, 24–12, to win their LFA-record third Tazón México championship. Dishon McNary was named the Tazón México MVP.

=== Background ===
On 19 May, the LFA announced that the Estadio Universitario UACH, home of the Caudillos de Chihuahua, was selected as the Tazón México site. It marked the second Tazón México hosted in Chihuahua, following Tazón México VI in 2023. It was also announced that a special edition of the championship trophy would be presented to the winner in honor of the league's 10th season of play. The trophy was presented at a media day held at the Nido de Águilas field in Chihuahua the day before the game.

The Caudillos came into the game looking to win their LFA-record third Tazón México title, while the Osos were vying for their first Tazón México title since their time as the Fundidores de Monterrey.

Tazón México IX was broadcast on ESPN2 and Disney+ in Mexico, and on Telemundo Deportes and Peacock in the United States.

Rock band El Gran Silencio performed after the game.

== Regular-season statistical leaders ==
2026 LFA statistical leaders
Category	Player	Team	Stat
Offense
Passing yards	Jeremy Johnson	Caudillos	1,860
Passing Touchdowns	Jeremy Johnson	Caudillos	20
Rushing yards	Chance Bell	Dinos	420
Rushing Touchdowns	Timothy Whitfield	Osos	6
Receptions	Juwan Manigo	Caudillos	37
Receiving yards	Keyon Lesane Sr.	Caudillos	642
Receiving Touchdowns	Keyon Lesane Sr.	Caudillos	10
Defense
Tackles	Vincent Sullivan	Dinos	68
Sacks	Tramel Logan, Jr.	Mexicas	4
Sacks	Rakweon Ramsey	Reyes	4
Sacks	Bryan Rice	Reyes	4
Interceptions	Marquise Manning	Gallos Negros	3
Special teams
Punt return yards	Juwan Manigo	Caudillos	199
Kick return yards	Joan Medina	Dinos	310
Field goals made	Jesús Aguirre	Osos	6
Field goals made	Gabriel Ballinas	Dinos	6

Source: LFA

== Awards ==
=== Players of the week ===
Week	Offensive Player			Defensive Player			Refs.
Week	Player	Pos.	Team	Player	Pos.	Team	Refs.
1	No awards given			No awards given			
2	Juwan Manigo	WR	Caudillos	Esteban Solares	LB	Raptors	
3	Mike Patiño	QB	Gallos Negros	Elorm Lumor	LB	Osos	
4	Keyon Lesane Sr.	WR	Caudillos	Marquise Manning	CB	Gallos Negros	
5	Juwan Manigo	WR	Caudillos	Karrheem Darrington	DB	Raptors	
6	Shelton Eppler	QB	Osos	Matthew Barrett	LB	Reyes	
7	Brandon Kyles	QB	Mexicas	Vincent Sullivan	LB	Dinos	
Semifinals	Julio Covarrubias	RB	Caudillos	Brian Hughes Jr.	DB	Osos	

== Venture capital funding ==
On 25 November 2025, it was announced that the league had received foreign backing from Global Sports Capital Partners, who pledged an investment of $100 million over a period of at least seven years, in a move branded as LFA 2.0.

In March 2026, the LFA announced a historic broadcast deal with ESPN, who acquired the exclusive rights to air all regular season and playoff games in Mexico, Latin America, and the Caribbean. Games were broadcast on ESPN2 and Disney+. Starting week 4, games were also broadcast in the United States by Telemundo Deportes via its livestreaming channel, Telemundo Deportes Ahora.

The league also reached a three-year sponsorship deal with Finsus, a financial institution, which included changing its official name to LFA Finsus.

The LFA welcomed several current and former NFL players as special guests to various games during the season:

- Will Hernandez, Reyes at Gallos Negros, Week 1
- Isaac Alarcón, Osos at Caudillos, Week 2
- Sam Darnold, Mexicas at Osos, Week 4
- Emmitt Smith, Gallos Negros at Caudillos, Week 5
