= Zack Wheeler =

American baseball player (born 1990)

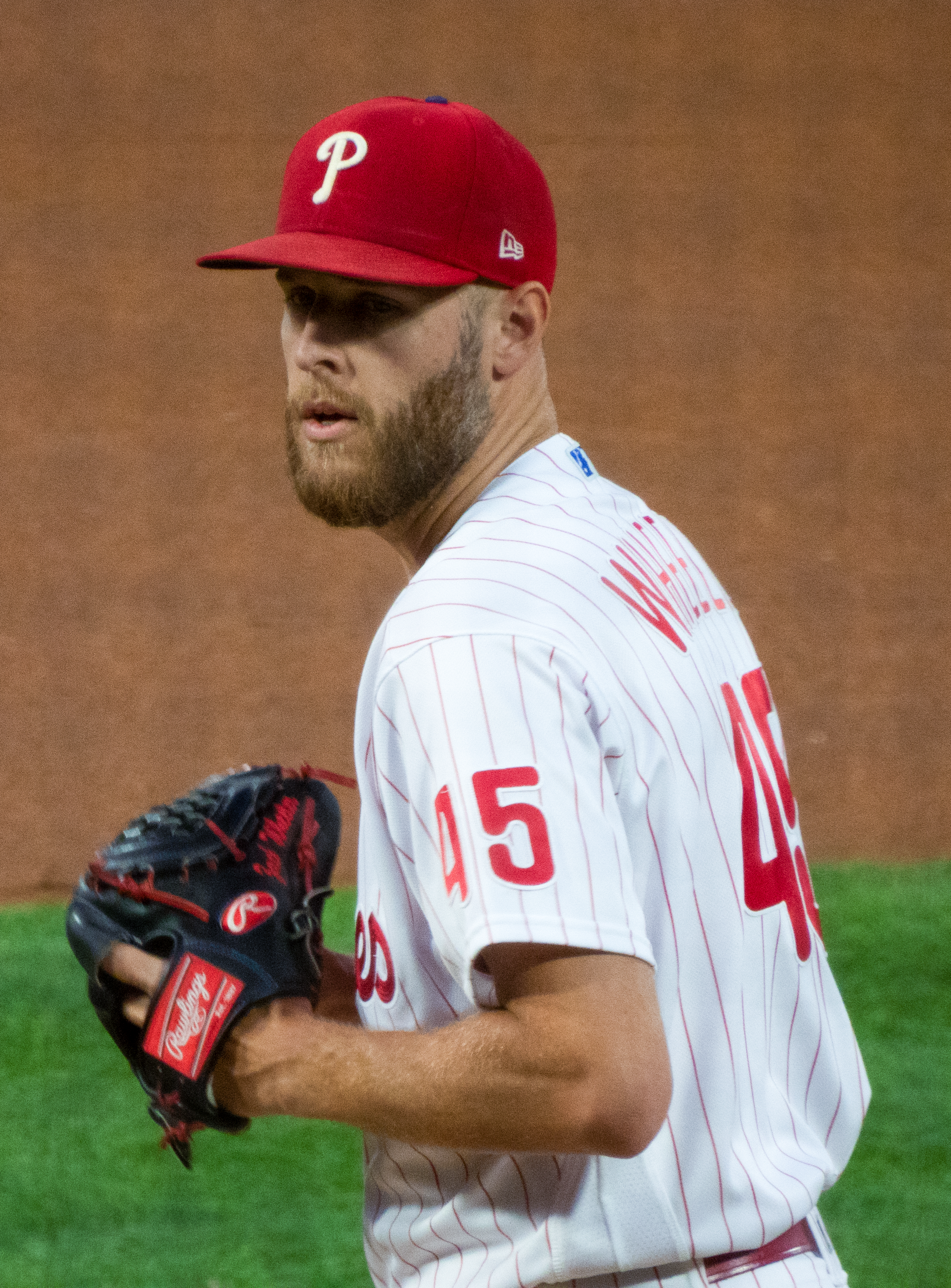
- Wheeler with the Philadelphia Phillies in 2022

Philadelphia Phillies – No. 45
- Pitcher
- Born: May 30, 1990 (age 36); Smyrna, Georgia, U.S.
- Bats: Left Throws: Right

MLB debut
- June 18, 2013, for the New York Mets

MLB statistics (through 2026 season)
- Win–loss record: 127–80
- Earned run average: 3.26
- Strikeouts: 2,013
- Stats at Baseball Reference

Teams
- New York Mets (2013–2014, 2017–2019); Philadelphia Phillies (2020–present)

Career highlights and awards
- 3× All-Star (2021, 2024, 2025); All-MLB First Team (2024); NL Comeback Player of the Year (2026); Gold Glove Award (2023); NL strikeout leader (2021)

Zachary Harrison Wheeler (born May 30, 1990) is an American professional baseball pitcher for the Philadelphia Phillies of Major League Baseball (MLB). He has previously played in MLB for the New York Mets.

Wheeler was born to a baseball-playing family in Smyrna, Georgia, but moved to Dallas, Georgia, shortly before starting high school. There, he pitched for East Paulding High School, leading the team to a state playoff appearance in 2009 and pitching a no-hitter against Mill Creek High School. The San Francisco Giants selected Wheeler sixth overall in the 2009 MLB draft, and he elected to sign with the team rather than honor his previous college baseball commitment for Kennesaw State. Wheeler played for the Giants' minor league teams in 2010 and 2011 before he was traded to the Mets in July 2011.

Wheeler then rose through the Mets' farm system, making his major league debut in 2013. Wheeler's development came to a sudden halt after he tore his ulnar collateral ligament during spring training in 2015. He underwent Tommy John surgery for the injury, and was expected to return during the 2016 season, but a series of setbacks during his rehabilitation kept Wheeler from returning until 2017.

Wheeler became a free agent at the end of the 2019 season and signed a five-year deal with the Phillies in December 2019. In his tenure with the Phillies, Wheeler has developed into the team's ace, posting a sub-3.00 ERA in five of his six seasons with the club and being named an All-Star in 2021, 2024, and 2025.

== Early life ==
Zachary Harrison Wheeler was born on May 30, 1990, in Smyrna, Georgia, and was raised in Dallas, Georgia, by Barry and Elaine Wheeler. Wheeler's father played amateur baseball for 15 years, while his mother continued playing competitive softball even after having children, going so far as to placing a playpen in the dugout during weekend tournaments. Zack was the youngest of three brothers, all of whom grew up playing baseball. His oldest brother, Jacob, stopped playing sports in high school after undergoing a series of surgeries for supraventricular tachycardia, while his middle brother, Adam, was a minor league pitcher in the New York Yankees farm system until he suffered a torn glenoid labrum.

The Wheeler family moved to Dallas, Georgia, when Zack was 13 years old. Rather than attending Campbell High School like his brothers, Wheeler attended East Paulding High School, where he played baseball and basketball. As a junior in 2008, Wheeler posted an 8–3 win–loss record, with a 1.31 earned run average (ERA) and 127 strikeouts in 64 1/3 innings pitched, and was named the Georgia High School Association 4A Region Pitcher of the Year. The following season, he set a school record with 149 strikeouts in 76 innings, in addition to posting a 9–0 record and 0.54 ERA, and was named the Gatorade Georgia Player of the Year. As a designated hitter, Wheeler also had a batting average of .280 during his senior year. During the second round of 2009 Class 5A state playoffs, Wheeler pitched his first no-hitter, against Mill Creek High School. In 2015, East Paulding retired Wheeler's No. 45 jersey.

== Professional career ==
=== Draft and minor leagues ===
The San Francisco Giants of Major League Baseball (MLB) selected Wheeler in the first round, sixth overall, of the 2009 MLB draft. At the time, he had committed to playing college baseball at Kennesaw State. On August 17, 2009, however, Wheeler chose to sign with the Giants, a deal that included a $3.3 million signing bonus.

Wheeler was assigned to the Single-A Augusta GreenJackets of the South Atlantic League to start the 2010 season. He was placed on the disabled list early in the year with a fingernail injury on the middle finger of his throwing hand. After six weeks without play, Wheeler was sent to San Francisco to see the team's hand specialist. He later returned to the GreenJackets, making several relief appearances before re-entering the starting rotation. In 21 games with Augusta, including 13 starts, Wheeler posted a 3–3 record and a 3.99 ERA, with 70 strikeouts in 58 2/3 innings. He also made an appearance at the 2010 All-Star Futures Game in Anaheim, California.

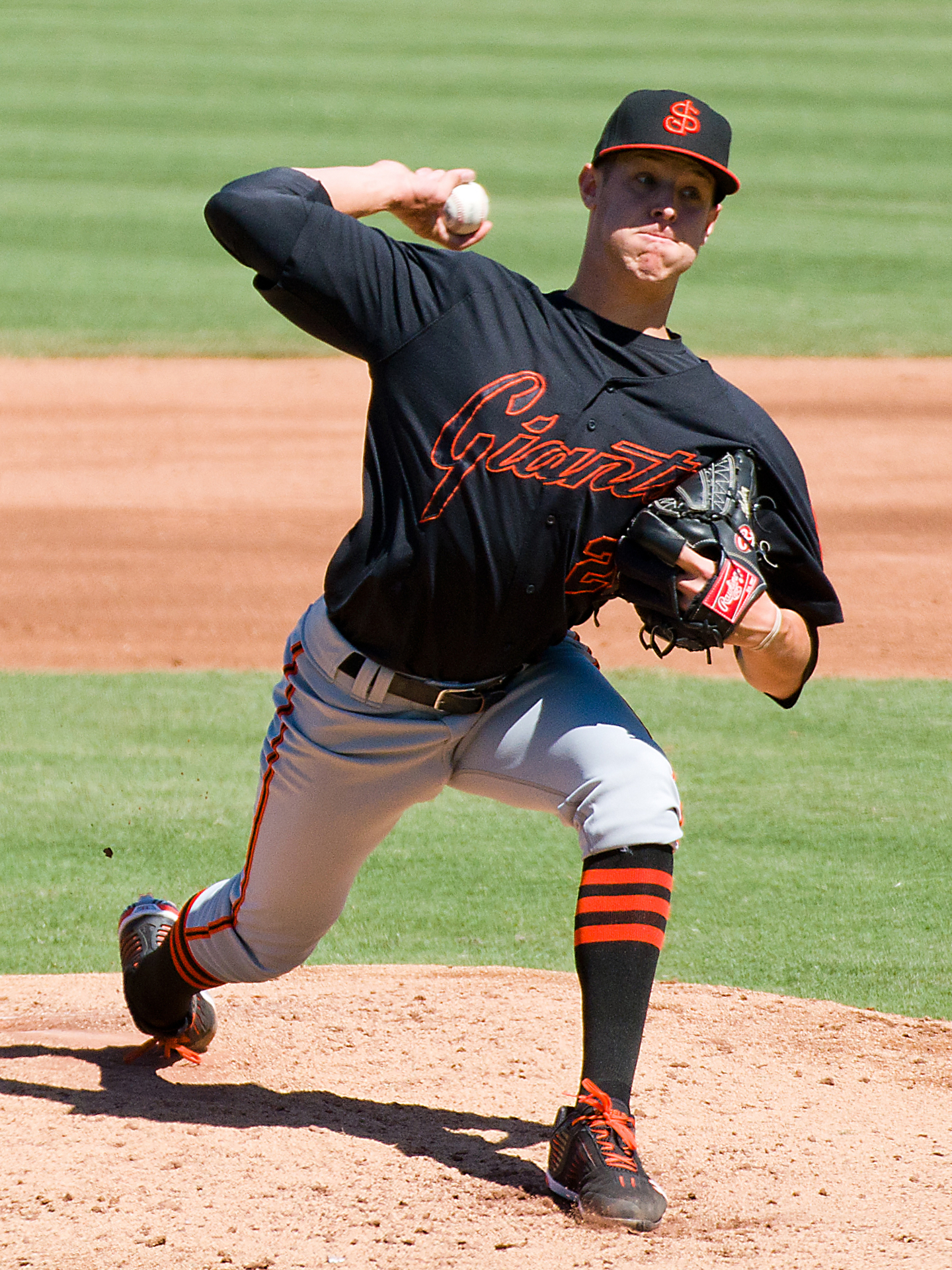
Wheeler pitching for the San Jose Giants in 2011

Prior to the 2011 season, Baseball America named Wheeler the number two prospect in the Giants organization, and declared that he had the "best fastball" in the farm system. He was assigned to the High-A San Jose Giants, with whom he went 7–5 with a 3.99 ERA and 98 strikeouts in 16 starts and 88 innings pitched. He also appeared in the 2011 California League All-Star Game.

On July 28, 2011, the Giants traded Wheeler to the New York Mets in exchange for veteran outfielder Carlos Beltrán and cash. Giants general manager Brian Sabean said that they chose to trade Wheeler rather than a position player because, "[w]e didn't think (Zack) Wheeler was going to impact our situation in the immediate future. Quite frankly, it's our job to find another Wheeler or develop another Wheeler." He spent the remainder of the season with the Single-A St. Lucie Mets, where he went 2–2 with a 2.00 ERA and 31 strikeouts in 27 innings across six starts.

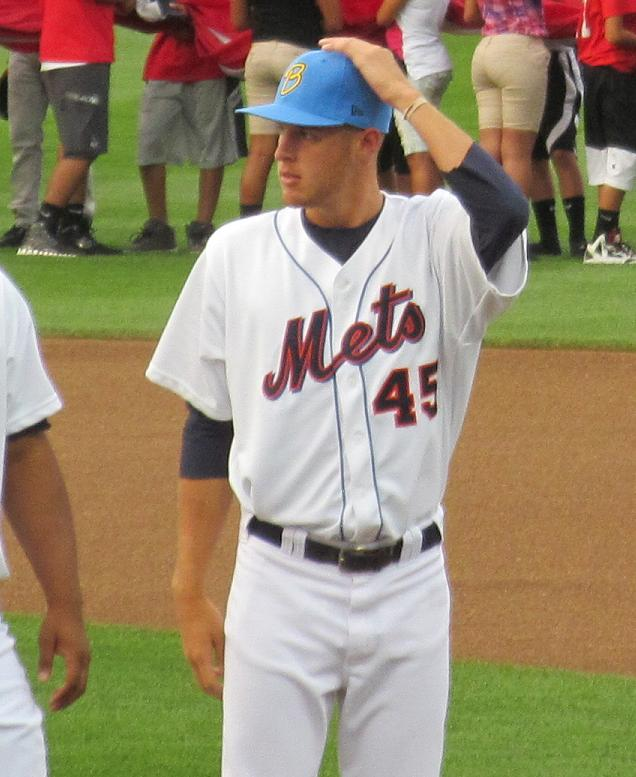
Wheeler with the Binghamton Mets in 2012

The Mets assigned Wheeler to the Double-A Binghamton Mets of the Eastern League at the start of the 2012 season, with the intention of allowing him to steadily progress through the farm system. He emerged as the star of that season's Binghamton pitching rotation, leading the Eastern League with a 25 percent strikeout rate. In 116 innings and 19 starts, Wheeler went 10–6 with Binghamton, giving up only two home runs in the process. In addition to being named an Eastern League All-Star, Wheeler received his second All-Star Future Game selection in 2012. On July 14, 2012, Wheeler pitched his first professional complete game shutout in a 1–0 victory over the Erie SeaWolves. The following day, the Mets clarified that, despite his pitching performance in Double-A, he was not being considered for a major league promotion, and that the rotation spot abdicated by Dillon Gee would be filled by either Matt Harvey or Miguel Batista.

The day after he struck out 11 batters in a game against the Harrisburg Senators, Wheeler was promoted to the Triple-A Buffalo Bisons on August 1, 2012. After a series of injuries befell members of the Mets' starting rotation, inning limits were placed on the team's top prospects, with Wheeler limited to 150. He was shut down on September 1, five innings into a match against the Lehigh Valley IronPigs. In 149 innings between Binghamton and Buffalo, Wheeler posted a 12–8 season record with a 3.26 ERA and led Minor League Baseball with 148 strikeouts. Mets general manager Sandy Alderson told reporters that Wheeler was expected to open the 2013 season with Buffalo and that he would likely make his major league debut that same year.

After the Bisons chose to reaffiliate with the Toronto Blue Jays during the 2012 offseason, Wheeler and other Mets Triple-A prospects began pitching in 2013 for the Las Vegas 51s of the Pacific Coast League, which was infamous at the time for its exceptional batting and, by extension, difficulty for pitchers. Wheeler stumbled at the beginning of the season, accumulating a 6.34 ERA in his first three starts with Las Vegas, but began to find his rhythm after striking out eight batters in 6 2/3 innings against the Reno Aces on April 30. With Las Vegas that season, Wheeler posted a 4–2 record with a 3.93 ERA and 73 strikeouts in 68 2/3 innings and 13 starts.

=== New York Mets (2013–2014, 2017–2019) ===
==== 2013–14 ====
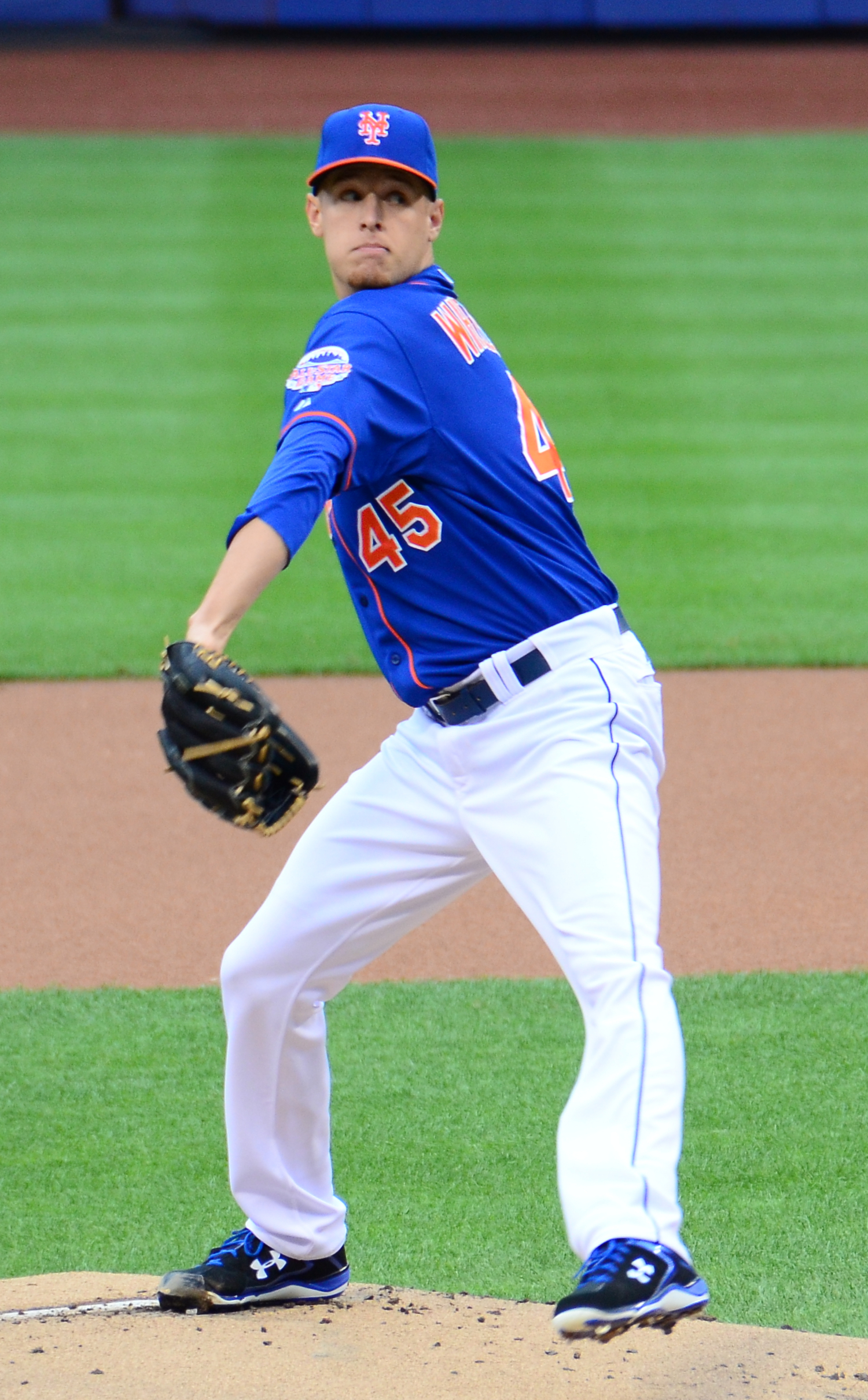
Wheeler with the Mets in 2013

Wheeler made his major league debut on June 18, 2013, pitching six shutout innings in the second game of a doubleheader against the Atlanta Braves. Wheeler recorded seven strikeouts and gave up four hits in the 6–1 victory. Two months later, on August 15, Wheeler struck out a career-high 12 batters in a 4–1 win over the San Diego Padres. In doing so, he became the youngest Mets pitcher to record at least 12 strikeouts in a game since Doc Gooden in 1986. The Mets shut Wheeler down for the season on September 21, after he experienced shoulder stiffness in his final start. Wheeler finished his rookie season with a 7–5 record, a 3.42 ERA, and 84 strikeouts in 100 innings across 17 starts.

With the news that Matt Harvey would miss the 2014 season to recover from Tommy John surgery, some sports journalists expected Wheeler to become the Mets' ace. His pitching was inconsistent in the first two months of the season, with pitch command problems leading to a large number of walks, and with a poor record against left-handed batters. On June 19, 2014, Wheeler pitched a complete-game shutout against the Miami Marlins, facing only 28 batters and allowing just three hits. Although the Mets' 2014 season was considered largely disappointing, being mathematically eliminated from postseason contention by September 20, Wheeler's performance was considered to be a bright spot. He posted an 11–11 record that season, with a 3.54 ERA and 187 strikeouts in 185 1/3 innings of work across 32 starts.

==== 2015–16 ====
On March 16, 2015, the Mets announced that Wheeler had torn the ulnar collateral ligament in his right elbow, an injury that was diagnosed after he began experiencing discomfort during spring training. Shortly after the announcement, sources reported that Wheeler had torn a tendon in the same elbow during the previous season, and that he had undergone platelet-rich plasma therapy to hasten the healing process. Wheeler underwent Tommy John surgery for the torn ligament on March 25. After seeing Matt Harvey's successful return to the mound following an 18-month rehabilitation process from the same surgery, the Mets expressed a desire to stretch out Wheeler's rehabilitation process, with a targeted return to the rotation in July 2016.

Wheeler suffered a series of setbacks in his return from Tommy John surgery. In early April 2016, he underwent a second surgery to remove an undissolved stitch in his elbow, and the Mets pushed his expected return to after the MLB All-Star break. In late June, he was scratched from a Gulf Coast League rehab start after experiencing elbow discomfort. Finally, in mid-August, Wheeler was shut down after being diagnosed with a strained flexor tendon, which required another platelet-rich plasma injection. On September 3, Mets manager Terry Collins told reporters that Wheeler was shut down for the remainder of the season.

==== 2017–19 ====
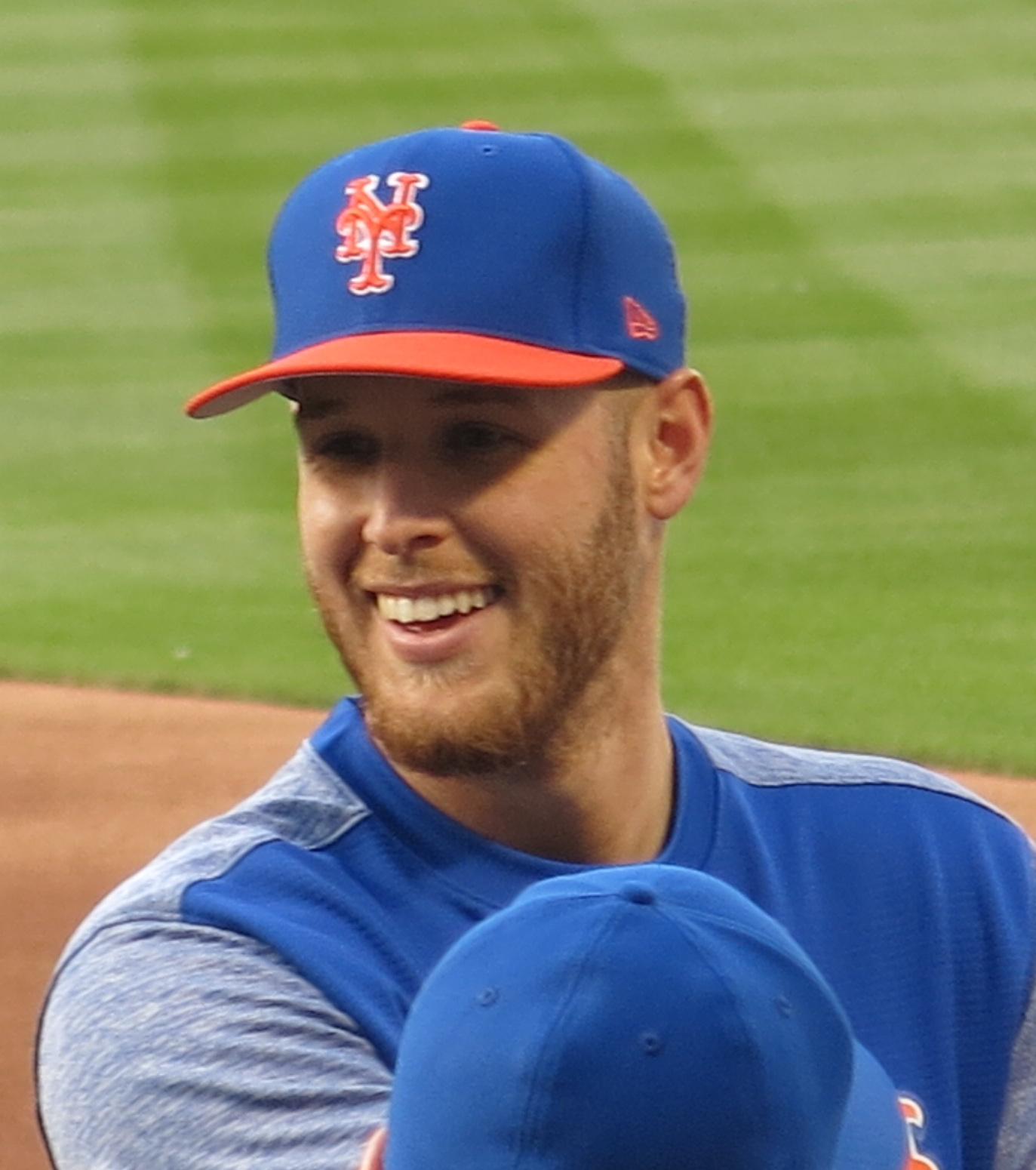
Wheeler with the Mets in 2017

Wheeler signed a one-year, $800,000 contract with the Mets on January 11, 2017, avoiding arbitration. He made his first major league start in over two years on April 8, allowing five runs and six hits in only four innings against the Miami Marlins. He pitched a perfect first inning, with his fastball speeds up to 97 mph (156 km/h), but as the game continued, his velocity dropped to 93 mph (150 km/h). The worst two starts of his career both occurred in June, first when he gave up eight runs in 1 2/3 innings against the Chicago Cubs and then when he gave up two home runs to Los Angeles Dodgers rookie Cody Bellinger, helping Bellinger set a record for most home runs in a player's first 51 major league games.

When Wheeler was put on the 10-day disabled list on June 22 with biceps tendinitis, revealing that he had been feeling soreness in the arm since a June 7 start against the Texas Rangers, some sports journalists wondered if he should have been pitching in those games. Injuries continued to follow Wheeler through the second part of the season. He returned to the disabled list on July 24 after suffering a stress injury to the humerus. He was shut down for the season on August 24. In 17 starts, Wheeler posted a 3–7 record with a 5.21 ERA for the 2017 season.

Although Wheeler entered the 2018 season healthy, the Mets' offseason signing of All-Star Jason Vargas led to speculation that Wheeler would be moved out of the starting rotation and into the bullpen. After a disappointing spring training performance, Wheeler began the season with Las Vegas. He was called to fill Vargas' spot in the rotation after the latter pitcher was placed on the disabled list, and a strong performance against the Washington Nationals on April 18 demonstrated Wheeler's ability to remain in the major league rotation. His pitching was particularly dominant after the All-Star break, where he led MLB in WHIP with 0.81 and had the second-lowest ERA with 1.32. By mid-September, the Mets were discussing whether Wheeler should be shut down for the season, as his 187 1/3 innings pitched were more than double his 2017 totals. Mets manager Mickey Callaway confirmed on September 19, 2018, that Wheeler was finished pitching for the season. He went 12–7 for the year, with a 3.31 ERA and a 1.12 WHIP in 29 starts.

As he was set to become a free agent at the end of the 2019 season, there were rumors that the Mets would attempt to trade Wheeler before the July 31 deadline, but they instead elected to retain him, with then-general manager Brodie Van Wagenen telling reporters, "We think he's a good pitcher. We have interest in him being a Met for the long term." As with the previous season, Wheeler improved in the second half of 2019. After going into the All-Star break with a 4.69 ERA, he allowed only one earned run in each of his final five starts. Wheeler also set career highs in innings pitched, with 195 1/3, and strikeouts, with 195. He finished the season with an 11–8 record and a 3.96 ERA in 31 starts.

=== Philadelphia Phillies (2020–present) ===
On December 9, 2019, the Philadelphia Phillies signed Wheeler as a free agent to a five-year, $118 million contract. He made his team debut with a 7–1 victory against the Miami Marlins on July 25, 2020, less than a week after the birth of his son Wesley. On September 9, Wheeler's fingernail became partially disconnected from the nail bed while he was attempting to put on a pair of jeans. He returned to the pitching rotation a week later, pitching with a fake fingernail, and had surgery for the injury on October 12. Wheeler finished the pandemic-shortened 2020 season with a 4–2 record and 2.92 ERA in 11 games and 71 innings, and led the NL in batters hit by pitch with 7. He was the first pitcher in Phillies history to allow three or fewer runs in each of his first 10 starts with the team, and he allowed only three home runs, the fewest of any pitcher in 2020 who pitched at least 70 innings.

Wheeler returned to the Phillies for the 2021 season. In his season debut on April 3, Wheeler struck out 10 batters in 7 innings, the first time he recorded a double-digit number of strikeouts with the Phillies. Additionally, he became the first Phillies' pitcher to have two or more hits and RBIs in a single game since Ben Lively in 2017. On May 29, Wheeler struck out a career-high 14 batters, becoming the third pitcher in Phillies history, following Steve Carlton and Curt Schilling, to strike out 10 or more batters in three consecutive starts. A wild pitch from Sam Coonrod in the eighth inning, however, caused the Tampa Bay Rays to win the game 5–3. After posting a 2.05 ERA in his first 17 starts and leading the league with 139 strikeouts in 114 innings pitched, Wheeler received his first MLB All-Star Game selection in 2021. When Mets ace and former teammate Jacob deGrom announced that he would not attend the All-Star Game, some fans speculated that Wheeler would be chosen to start for the National League team; the honor was ultimately given to Max Scherzer of the Nationals, with Wheeler making an appearance at the top of the ninth inning to strike out Matt Olson and retire the side. Wheeler led MLB with a career-high 213 1/3 innings, finishing the season 14–10 with a 2.78 ERA as well as a league-leading three complete games, two shutouts, and 849 batters faced. Fanning 247, Wheeler also became the first Phillies pitcher to capture the NL strikeout title since Curt Schilling in 1998. Wheeler finished second in NL Cy Young Award voting behind Corbin Burnes. He was named a finalist for the 2021 NL Gold Glove Award at pitcher, but it was won by Max Fried.

In 2022, he was 12–7 with a 2.82 ERA in 153 innings with 163 strikeouts over 26 starts, and his career 0.812 home runs-per-9 innings was the 4th-lowest among active major league pitchers. His salary of $26 million was the 10th-highest of all NL baseball players.

In 2023, his ERA worsened to 3.61, but his win-loss record improved to 13–6. He struck out 212 batters in 192 innings and earned his first career Gold Glove Award. He relied primarily on his four-seam fastball (44% of the time) and slider (27%), while also mixing in a sinker and curveball.

On March 4, 2024, Wheeler signed a three-year, $126 million contract extension with the Phillies. In 2024, he was 16–7 with a 2.57 ERA in 200 innings with 224 strikeouts over 32 starts. He finished second in NL Cy Young voting for the second time in his career, finishing behind Chris Sale.

On June 9, 2025, Wheeler struck out Kyle Tucker in the sixth inning to record his 1,000th career strikeout as a member of the Philadelphia Phillies. He became the 10th player in franchise history to reach 1,000 strikeouts in a Phillies uniform.

In July 2025, Wheeler declined to participate as a National League pitcher in the 2025 All-Star Game at Truist Park in Atlanta, stating that he would "rather just get [himself] ready to go for the second half" of the season despite how "it would be an honor to throw [or] start."

On August 16, 2025, Wheeler was placed on the injured list after a right upper extremity blood clot was discovered near his right shoulder. On August 23, he was officially diagnosed with venous thoracic outlet syndrome and underwent season-ending thoracic outlet decompression surgery. Wheeler finished his 2025 season with a 10–5 record, a 2.71 ERA, and 195 strikeouts (a league-high mark at the time of his injury).

Wheeler has announced that he will retire from baseball when his contract with the Phillies expires following the 2027 season. Wheeler told SportsRadio WIP at the beginning of the 2026 MLB season that while no major changes have occurred for retirement plans, "never say never," and retirement ultimately hinges on the 2027 MLB Lockout.

Wheeler was activated off the injured list on April 25, 2026, and made his season debut against the Atlanta Braves the same day, recording a no-decision as the Phillies won, helping snap a 10-game losing streak.

== Pitcher profile ==
Wheeler has a five-pitch repertoire, consisting of a four-seam fastball, a sinker, a curveball, a slider, and a changeup. Baseball analysts consider Wheeler's four-seam fastball to be his best pitch, with a comparable release path to former Phillies ace Cole Hamels. In 2019, his average fastball speed of 96.8 mph (155.8 km/h) was much higher than the MLB average of 93.4 mph (150.3 km/h). His sinker is also known for its velocity: in the pandemic-shortened 2020 season, Wheeler's sinker velocity of 97.1 mph (156.3 km/h) was the second-highest among pitchers who threw the pitch at least 100 times. As his career progressed, however, Wheeler began to show a preference for pitching the fastball, as batters made contact more often against the sinker. The change was similar to that of New York Yankees pitcher Gerrit Cole, whose pitching performance improved after abandoning his sinker.

Among his other pitches, Wheeler uses his curveball and changeup to supplement the fastball and slider. He considers the curveball to be "decent", and believes that his control of the pitch, which he has been throwing since high school, has decreased with the continued improvement of his slider. His changeup, by contrast, is a more recent pitch, one that Wheeler began throwing in the 2014 season to confuse batters expecting a hard fastball. His slider is his least developed pitch, and Wheeler expressed a desire prior to the 2021 season to improve the pitch's consistency and "make it look like a strike instead of it ... being like a waste pitch".

== Personal life ==
Wheeler and his wife Dominique have four children, a son born July 20, 2020, shortly before the start of the pandemic-shortened 2020 MLB season, and three daughters. They reside in Dallas, Georgia during the offseason.

Wheeler has a close friendship with retired Atlanta Braves player Chipper Jones. The two were introduced when Jones' agents recruited Wheeler out of high school.

== See also ==
- List of Major League Baseball career strikeout leaders

Awards and achievements
Preceded by Jacob deGrom	Major League Baseball annual strikeout leader 2021	Succeeded by Corbin Burnes
Awards
Preceded by Pablo Lopez	National League Pitcher of the Month; April 2022	Succeeded by Sandy Alcántara
Preceded by Robbie Ray	National League Pitcher of the Month; June 2025	Succeeded by Paul Skenes
