= Marco Martos (American football) =

Mexican gridiron football player (born 1973)

No. 1
- Position: Wide receiver / Kickoff returner

Personal information
- Born: December 14, 1973 (age 52); Mexico City, Mexico

Career information
- College: Aztecas UDLAP

Career history

Playing
- Barcelona Dragons (1997); Denver Broncos (1997)*; Barcelona Dragons (1998); Dallas Cowboys (1998)*; Barcelona Dragons (1999–2003); Carolina Panthers (2003)*; Cologne Centurions (2004)
- * Offseason or practice squad member only

Coaching
- Leones Anáhuac Cancún (2005–2018); Arcángeles de Puebla (2025–2026) Head coach; Gallos Negros de Querétaro (2027–) Head coach

Awards and highlights
- World Bowl champion (V); 2× ONEFA champion (1995, 1996)

Marco Antonio Martos (born December 14, 1973) is a Mexican gridiron football coach and former player who is the head coach of the Gallos Negros de Querétaro of the Liga de Fútbol Americano Profesional (LFA). He played eight seasons in NFL Europe for the Barcelona Dragons and Cologne Centurions as a wide receiver and kickoff returner.

Martos is the second all-time, all-purpose yards gainer in NFL Europe history. He also played in preseason games for the Denver Broncos, Dallas Cowboys and Carolina Panthers of the National Football League.

== College career ==
Martos began his football career at the Universidad de las Américas, Puebla, only a few miles from Mexico City. He spent five seasons (1992–96) with the Aztecas UDLAP as a starting wide receiver. In 1995, Martos led the team to their first-ever ONEFA national championship, and its first national title overall since 1949. The following year, he completed his college career with another ONEFA championship.

== Coaching career ==
Martos served as the head coach of the college football team Leones Anáhuac Cancún in Cancún, Mexico from 2005 to 2018. He cited personal issues as the reason for his departure, wanting to spend more time with his four children.

In January 2025, Martos was hired as the first head coach of the Arcángeles de Puebla, an expansion team in the Liga de Fútbol Americano Profesional (LFA).

After two seasons with Puebla, Martos was presented as the new head coach of the Gallos Negros de Querétaro on 12 November 2026.
