= Chas Henry =

American football player (born 1989)

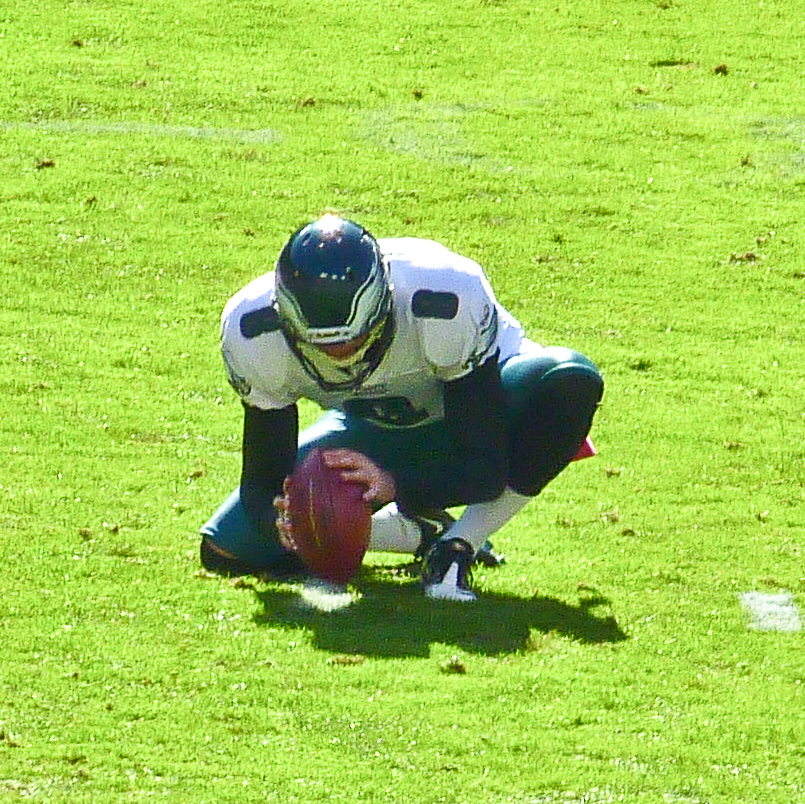
- Henry holding a kick in 2011

No. 8
- Position: Punter

Personal information
- Born: January 6, 1989 (age 37); Dallas, Georgia, U.S.
- Listed height: 6 ft 3 in (1.91 m)
- Listed weight: 219 lb (99 kg)

Career information
- High school: East Paulding (Dallas)
- College: Florida (2007–2010)
- NFL draft: 2011: undrafted

Career history
- Philadelphia Eagles (2011–2012); Tampa Bay Buccaneers (2013)*
- * Offseason or practice squad member only

Awards and highlights
- BCS national champion (2009); Ray Guy Award (2010); Consensus All-American (2010); First-team All-SEC (2010); 2× Second-team All-SEC (2008, 2009)

Career NFL statistics
- Punts: 82
- Punting yards: 3,606
- Punting average: 44
- Longest punt: 62
- Inside 20: 21
- Stats at Pro Football Reference

Chas Henry (born January 6, 1989) is an American former professional football player who was a punter in the National Football League (NFL). Henry played college football for the Florida Gators, earning consensus All-American honors and winning the Ray Guy Award. He was signed by the Philadelphia Eagles as an undrafted free agent in 2011.

== Early life ==
Henry was born in Dallas, Georgia. He attended East Paulding High School in Dallas, and he played high school football for the East Paulding Raiders. Henry holds the school record for longest punt (66 yards) and led the Raiders to the state semi-finals as quarterback by throwing for 17 touchdowns and more than 1,700 yards.

== College career ==
Henry accepted an athletic scholarship to attend the University of Florida in Gainesville, Florida, where he played for coach Urban Meyer's Florida Gators football team from 2007 to 2010. As a sophomore in 2008, Henry was a member of the Gators' BCS National Championship team.

During his senior season in 2010, Henry punted 50 times for 2,253 yards (a 45.1-yard average), including his season-best punt of 75 yards. Sixteen of his punts landed inside the 20-yard line and only thirteen were fair caught. Memorably, Henry also assumed place-kicking duties when starting place kicker Caleb Sturgis was injured, and kicked the 37-yard, game-winning field goal in the Gators' 34–31 overtime victory over the rival Georgia Bulldogs while several Bulldog assistant coaches attempted to distract him from the sideline.

Following the 2010 regular season, Henry was recognized as a consensus first-team All-American, and received the Ray Guy Award, awarded to the best punter in college football. He was one of three finalists for the award in 2009, and one of ten semifinalists in 2008.

== Professional career ==
=== Philadelphia Eagles ===
After he was not selected in the 2011 NFL draft, Henry signed as an undrafted free agent with the Philadelphia Eagles. He opened the 2011 NFL season as the Eagles' starting punter. Henry committed a Monday Night Football blunder against the Chicago Bears in a Week 9 loss, in which he botched a fake punt, and his pass was underthrown.

Henry was released by the Eagles on September 25, 2012.

=== Tampa Bay Buccaneers ===
Henry was signed by the Buccaneers on February 13, 2013, and was competing for the starting spot against Michael Koenen. Henry was cut by Tampa Bay on August 31, 2013.

== See also ==
- 2008 Florida Gators football team
- 2010 College Football All-America Team
- List of Florida Gators football All-Americans
- List of University of Florida alumni
