= Estadio Coliseo Maya =

Multi-use stadium in Cancún, Quintana Roo, Mexico

Coordinates: 21°3′39″N 86°50′45″W

- Interactive map of Estadio Coliseo Maya
- Location: Cancún, Quintana Roo, Mexico
- Capacity: 4,500
- Current use: American football matches

Tenant
- Leones Anáhuac Cancún

The Estadio Coliseo Maya is a multi-use stadium located in Cancún, Quintana Roo, Mexico. It is used mostly for American football matches. The stadium has a capacity of 4,500 people.

The stadium currently serves as the home field of the college football program for the Universidad Anáhuac Cancún, the Leones Anáhuac Cancún. It also hosted the Tiburones de Cancún for a single game in 2022.
