= East Paulding High School =

Public secondary school in Dallas, Georgia, United States

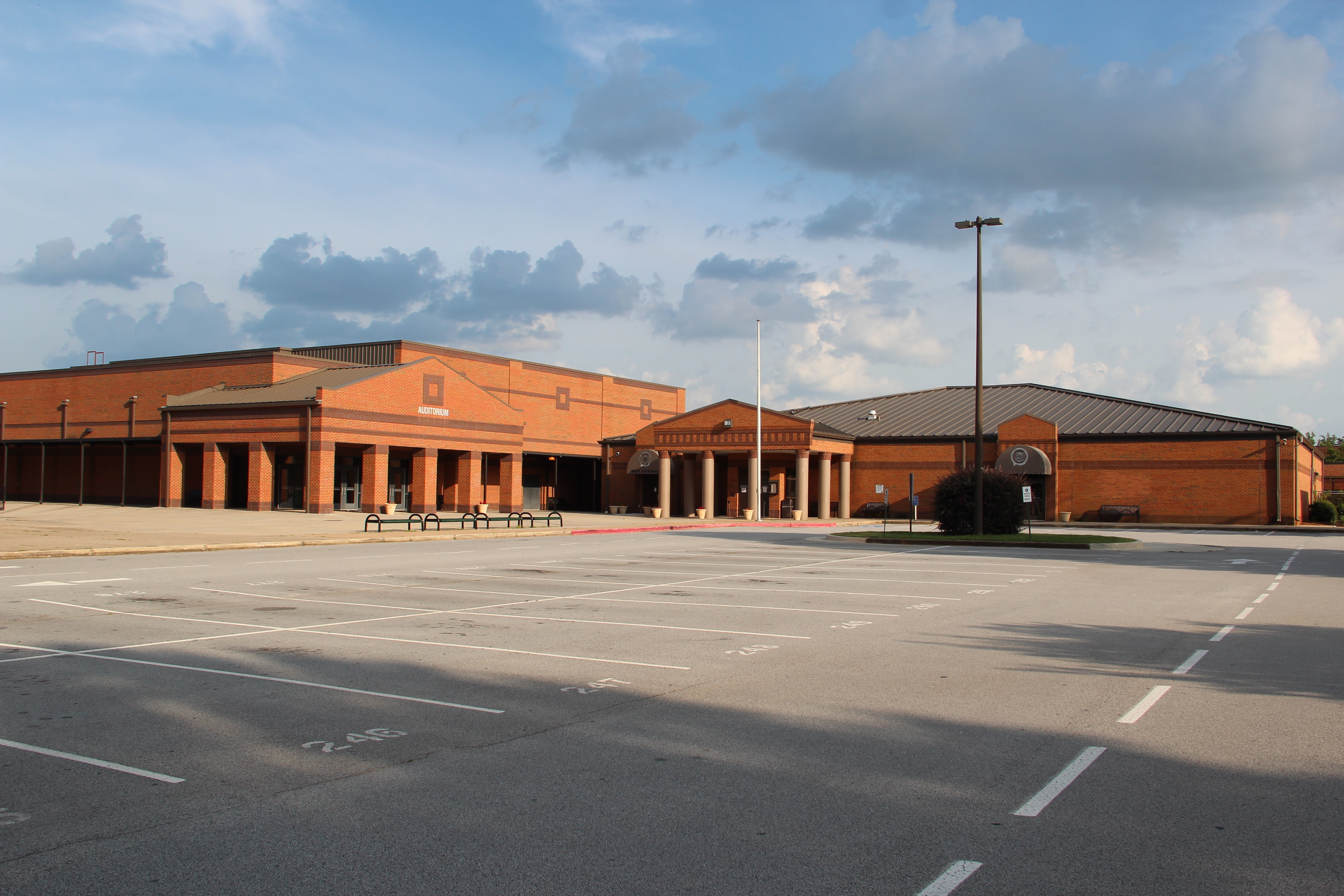

Location
- 3320 East Paulding Drive; Dallas, Georgia, 30157; United States; 33°56′22″N 84°44′48″W

Information
- Type: Public
- Established: 1991
- School district: Paulding County School District
- Principal: Brad Thompson
- Staff: 114.60 (on FTE basis)
- Grades: 9 to 12
- Enrollment: 1,904 (2023–2024)
- Student to teacher ratio: 16.61
- Colors: Silver and black
- Team name: Raiders
- Website: https://ephs.paulding.k12.ga.us/

This map shows the incorporated and unincorporated areas in Paulding County, Georgia, highlighting Dallas in red.

East Paulding High School is a public secondary school located in Dallas, Georgia, United States.

EPHS was established in 1991 and is nestled in one of the country's fastest-growing counties. The school's enrollment is approaching 1800 students.

Brad Thomason was appointed Principal during the summer of 2020.

== History ==
The school was founded in 1991.

In 2009, the school added a 44-classroom, two-story building, including a cosmetology lab and a new band room, nearly doubling the school's capacity. In June 2017, a fire destroyed the gymnasium while contractors were repairing the school's HVAC system and roof.

In early 2025 a small fire broke out in the main auditorium due to excessive rain. The water caused an electrical short. Even months after this the school still hasn't patched leaks in the main hallway. School board to be notified soon. Students safety in question.

== United States Air Force Junior Reserve Officers' Training Corps (JROTC) ==
The SASI is SMSgt Stan Parker and the ASI is MSgt Tanya Hagarman. The current corps commander is Olivia Western.

The EPHS Air Force Junior ROTC Drill Team is the 2010 Air Force Nationals Unarmed Eastern Division Champions. The Junior ROTC Drill Team is also the 2014 National High School Drill Team Champion in the Armed and Unarmed divisions.

Previous Drill Team archived files found in wrong section:

== Fine and Performing Arts ==
East Paulding has multiple fine arts programs including Visual Arts, Drama, Band, and Chorus.

The EPHS Theatre Company's one-act play "Epic Proportions" was the GHSA Region 7-AAAAA Champion in 2012. The EPHS Theatre Hall of Fame 2002-2015 under the direction of Grant Brown.

== Notable alumni ==
- Chas Henry - punter, played for the Philadelphia Eagles; played college football at the University of Florida.
- Dishon McNary - defensive back, Montreal Alouettes; played college football at Central Michigan University.
- Zachary Wheeler (class of 2009) - pitcher, Philadelphia Phillies; former first round draft pick of San Francisco Giants.
