= Mardy Gilyard =

American football player (born 1986)

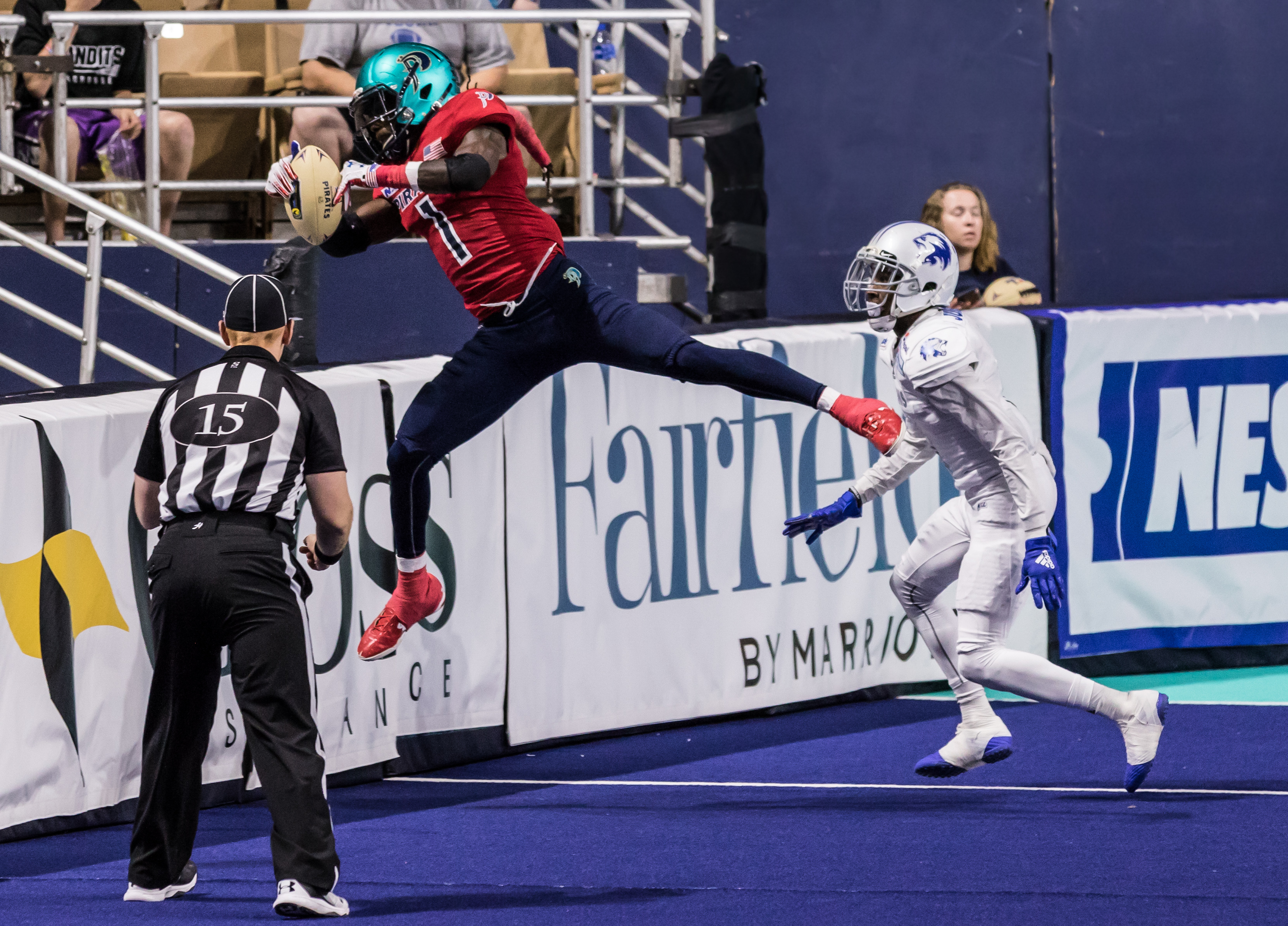
- Gilyard with the Massachusetts Pirates in 2019

No. 81, 19, 16
- Position: Wide receiver

Personal information
- Born: December 2, 1986 (age 39); Daytona Beach, Florida, U.S.
- Listed height: 6 ft 0 in (1.83 m)
- Listed weight: 187 lb (85 kg)

Career information
- High school: Flagler Palm Coast (Palm Coast, Florida)
- College: Cincinnati
- NFL draft: 2010: 4th round, 99th overall pick

Career history

Playing
- St. Louis Rams (2010); New York Jets (2011)*; Philadelphia Eagles (2012); New York Jets (2012); Kansas City Chiefs (2013)*; Montreal Alouettes (2013)*; Jacksonville Sharks (2014); Montreal Alouettes (2014); Jacksonville Sharks (2016); Monterrey Steel (2017); Massachusetts Pirates (2018–2021); Tiburones de Cancún (2022)
- * Offseason or practice squad member only

Coaching
- Nichols (2019–2022) Special teams coordinator & defensive backs coach; Massachusetts Pirates (2023) Offensive Assistant

Awards and highlights
- First-team All-NAL (2019); First-team All-American (2009); 2× First-team Big East (2008, 2009); 2× Big East Special Teams POY (2008, 2009)

Career NFL statistics
- Receptions: 8
- Receiving yards: 78
- Stats at Pro Football Reference

Career CFL statistics
- Receptions: 2
- Receiving yards: 16
- Stats at CFL.ca (archived)

Career AFL statistics
- Receptions: 182
- Receiving yards: 2,006
- Receiving touchdowns: 56
- Stats at ArenaFan.com

Marshawn "Mardy" Gilyard (born December 2, 1986) is an American former professional football player who was a wide receiver in the National Football League (NFL) and Canadian Football League (CFL). He was selected by the St. Louis Rams in the fourth round of the 2010 NFL draft. He played college football for the Cincinnati Bearcats.

== Early life ==
Gilyard attended Flagler Palm Coast High School in Palm Coast, Florida, where he was a first-team Class 5A all-state selection. He capped his career with over 2,500 yards and 30 touchdowns and was named MVP of the Florida Coast All-Star Game.

Considered only a two-star recruit by Rivals.com, Gilyard was not ranked among the nation's best wide receiver prospects. He committed to Cincinnati on February 2, 2005.

== College career ==
Gilyard played cornerback as a freshman in 2005. He finished the season with seven tackles. As a sophomore in 2006 he was redshirted due to academic reasons. In 2007 Gilyard started 7 of 12 games at wide receiver for the Bearcats. He finished the season with 36 receptions for 536 yards and 3 touchdowns. In 2008, he recorded 81 receptions for 1,276 yards and 11 touchdowns. As a senior in 2009 he was an All-American after he had 87 receptions for 1,191 yards and 11 touchdowns. He was selected to play in the 2010 Senior Bowl and was the offensive player of the game after he had 103 yards on five receptions and a touchdown.

Gilyard finished his college career with 204 receptions for 3,003 yards and 25 touchdowns.

== Professional career ==
Pre-draft measurables
Height	Weight	Arm length	Hand span	40-yard dash	10-yard split	20-yard split	20-yard shuttle	Three-cone drill	Vertical jump	Broad jump
5 ft 11 7/8 in (1.83 m)	187 lb (85 kg)	32 1/4 in (0.82 m)	9 1/8 in (0.23 m)	4.52 s	1.53 s	2.62 s	4.14 s	6.78 s	39 in (0.99 m)	9 ft 8 in (2.95 m)
Values from NFL Combine

=== St. Louis Rams ===
Gilyard was selected in the fourth round with the 99th overall pick by the St. Louis Rams in the 2010 NFL draft. On June 28, 2010, Gilyard signed a four-year $2.32 million contract with a signing bonus of $552,000.

In his rookie season, he saw action in 11 games (including two starts), totaling six receptions for 63 yards (a 10.3 average) and 16 kick returns for 356 yards (a 22.3 average)

He was released by the Rams in the final cutdown after the fourth preseason game in the 2011 preseason.

=== New York Jets (first stint) ===
The New York Jets claimed Gilyard off waivers on September 4, 2011. However, he was waived by the Jets on September 9.

=== Philadelphia Eagles ===
Gilyard worked out for the Philadelphia Eagles in September 2011 and met with the team again on January 5, 2012. He was signed to a futures contract the following day. On August 31, 2012 Gilyard was released by the Eagles. On September 11, 2012, he was signed by the Eagles. In six games with the Eagles, his only stats were two punts returned for 15 yards. On November 23, 2012, he was released to make room for Greg Salas.

=== New York Jets (second stint) ===
Gilyard was signed to the Jets' active roster on November 28, 2012. The Jets waived Gilyard on December 24, 2012. In two games with the Jets, he caught two passes for 15 yards.

=== Kansas City Chiefs ===
Gilyard was signed by the Kansas City Chiefs on February 9, 2013. On July 25, 2013, Gilyard was released by the Kansas City Chiefs.

=== Montreal Alouettes (first stint) ===
On October 3, 2013, Gilyard signed with the Montreal Alouettes.

=== Jacksonville Sharks (first stint) ===
On October 31, 2013, Gilyard was assigned to the Jacksonville Sharks of the Arena Football League.

=== Montreal Alouettes (second stint) ===
During the 2014 season, he caught two passes for 16 yards.

=== Jacksonville Sharks (second stint) ===
On June 1, 2016, Gilyard was activated by the Sharks. On June 22, 2016, Gilyard was placed on recallable reassignment.

=== Monterrey Steel ===
On February 28, 2017, Gilyard signed with the Monterrey Steel of the National Arena League (NAL). On June 21, 2017, Gilyard was released.

=== Massachusetts Pirates ===
On December 6, 2017, Gilyard signed with the Massachusetts Pirates of the National Arena League (NAL). During the 2018 season, Gilyard recorded 69 receptions, 747 receiving yards, and 19 TDs. Gilyard re-signed with the Pirates for the 2019 season and produced 84 receptions, 950 receiving yards, and 29 TDs. Gilyard was named to the 1st-Team All-NAL for the 2019 season. During the 2021 IFL season, Gilyard appeared in 2 games for the Massachusetts Pirates while making 4 receptions for 41 yards.

=== Tiburones de Cancún ===
In 2022, Gilyard signed and played for the Tiburones de Cancún of Fútbol Americano de México (FAM).

== Coaching ==
In 2019, Gilyard joined the football coaching staff at Nichols College in Dudley, Massachusetts. He will serve as defensive backs coach for the Bison, whom are an NCAA Division III program in the Commonwealth Coast Conference.
