= Estadio Andrés Quintana Roo =

Stadium in Cancún, Mexico

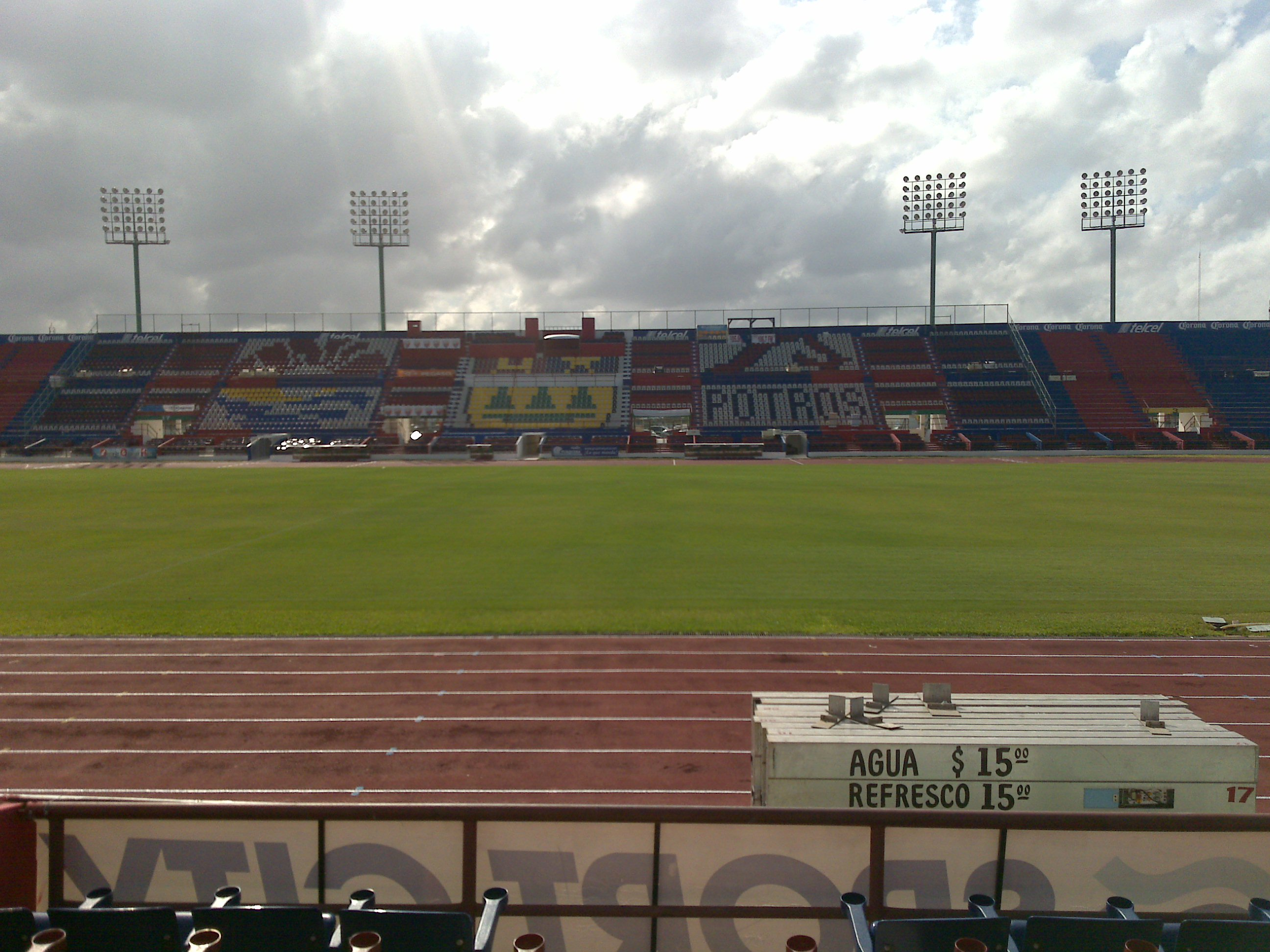
- Interactive map of Estadio Andrés Quintana Roo
- Full name: Estadio Olímpico Andrés Quintana Roo
- Location: Cancún, Quintana Roo, Mexico
- Coordinates: 21.150995°N 86.838348°W
- Owner: Quintana Roo State Government
- Capacity: 18,844
- Surface: Grass

Construction
- Opened: 2007

Tenants
- Atlante (Ascenso MX) (2007-2020); Pioneros de Cancún (Segunda División de México) (2014-15, 2015–present); Cancún F.C. (Expansión MX) (2020–present); Tiburones de Cancún (FAM) (2022)

The Estadio Olímpico Andrés Quintana Roo is a 18,844 seat stadium in Cancún, Quintana Roo, Mexico. It is the home field of Expansión MX’s Cancún F.C., and was formerly the home field of Ascenso MX's Atlante F.C. The stadium was inaugurated on 11 August 2007. Atlante F.C. won their 3rd league title on the Apertura 2007 against Universidad Nacional at this stadium. The Houston Dynamo became the first Major League Soccer team to play in the stadium on 3 March 2009, when the club were defeated by Atlante in the second leg of the CONCACAF Champions League quarterfinals.

The stadium was set to host the Tiburones de Cancún of the Fútbol Americano de México league for their 2022 season, though the team only played their home opener at the stadium before they were forced to find another venue.
