= Khiry Robinson =

American football player (born 1989)

No. 29, 33
- Position: Running back

Personal information
- Born: December 28, 1989 (age 36); Midland, Texas, U.S.
- Listed height: 6 ft 0 in (1.83 m)
- Listed weight: 220 lb (100 kg)

Career information
- High school: Belton (Belton, Texas)
- College: West Texas A&M
- NFL draft: 2013: undrafted

Career history
- New Orleans Saints (2013–2015); New York Jets (2016); Toronto Argonauts (2018)*; San Antonio Commanders (2019)*; Bolzano Giants (2020); Tiburones de Cancún (2021–2022)
- * Offseason or practice squad member only

Awards and highlights
- NJCAA national champion (2009)

Career NFL statistics
- Rushing attempts: 194
- Rushing yards: 788
- Rushing average: 4.1
- Receptions: 25
- Receiving yards: 178
- Total touchdowns: 8
- Stats at Pro Football Reference

Khiry Kenneth Tyrone Robinson (born December 28, 1989) is an American former professional football player who was a running back in the National Football League (NFL) with the New Orleans Saints and New York Jets. Robinson signed with the Saints as an undrafted free agent in 2013 after playing college football for the West Texas A&M Buffaloes.

== Early life ==
Khiry Kenneth Tyrone Robinson was born on December 28, 1989, in Midland, Texas. He graduated from Belton High School in Belton, Texas.

== College career ==
=== Mesabi Range College ===
In 2008, Robinson played junior college football for Mesabi Range Community and Technical College (now known as Mesabi Range College) in Virginia, Minnesota, winning the Minnesota College Athletic Conference championship. He led the division in rushing and scored the only points of the championship game.

=== Blinn College ===
Robinson then attended Blinn College in Brenham, Texas from 2009 to 2010. Robinson missed the 2009 season due to an ACL injury. Blinn won the 2009 NJCAA national championship in his absence. He was moved to safety in 2010 and led the team with 79 tackles.

=== West Texas A&M ===
Robinson went on to West Texas A&M University, where he played for two seasons for the Buffaloes and was named to the 2012 D2Football.com All-America team at running back.

== Professional career ==
=== New Orleans Saints ===
The New Orleans Saints signed Robinson as an undrafted free agent on May 13, 2013, on a tryout basis, and he survived training camp to make the team. Robinson ran for 224 yards in 10 regular season games, and had a key role in the Saints' first-round playoff win over the Philadelphia Eagles.

In 2014, Robinson was again part of the Saints' corps of running backs. When Mark Ingram II suffered a broken hand in Week 2, Robinson's role increased. In a Week 5 overtime game against the Tampa Bay Buccaneers, he finished the game with a well-executed 18-yard run for a touchdown that won the game 37–31.

In 2015, Robinson continued to be a part of the Saints' running back line up. In the Week 8 victory over the New York Giants, Robinson's season came to an end when he suffered a tibia fracture and was placed on injured reserve. He ended the season with 56 carries for 180 yards and four touchdowns.

=== New York Jets ===
Robinson signed with the New York Jets on March 10, 2016. Robinson was waived/injured by the Jets on September 4, after suffering a broken leg in New York's final preseason game against the Philadelphia Eagles. He was re-signed by the Jets on December 7. Robinson was placed on injured reserve on December 28, after re-injuring his leg.

On March 9, 2017, Robinson was released by the Jets.

=== Toronto Argonauts ===
Robinson signed with the Toronto Argonauts of the Canadian Football League on May 25, 2018. He was released by the Argonauts on June 3.

=== San Antonio Commanders ===
In 2018, Robinson signed with the San Antonio Commanders of the Alliance of American Football for the inaugural 2019 season. However, he was released before the start of the season.

=== Bolzano Giants ===
On November 25, 2019, Robinson signed with the Bolzano Giants of the Italian Football League.

=== Tiburones de Cancún ===
Robinson joined the Tiburones de Cancún of the Fútbol Americano de México (FAM) ahead of the 2021 season. The season was ultimately cancelled due to the COVID-19 pandemic in Mexico, but he returned to the team in 2022.
