= Estadio Juan Josafat Pichardo =

Coordinates: 19°16′35.5″N 99°39′27.5″W

The Estadio Juan Josafat Pichardo is a multi-use stadium located in Toluca, State of Mexico. It is currently used mostly for American football matches The stadium has a capacity of 4,000 people.
