= Pumas Acatlán football =

- First season: 1978
- Head coach: Enrique Zapata; 2nd season, 1–8 (.111)
- Location: Naucalpan, State of Mexico
- Stadium: FES Acatlán Stadium (capacity: 3,500)
- League: ONEFA
- Conference: 14 Grandes Conference
- Colors: Navy blue and Gold

National championships
- Claimed: 1 (1987)

Conference championships
- 4 (Nacional: 1983, 1999, 2003, 2013)
- Rivalries: UNAM CU; IPN

The Pumas Acatlán football program represents the Acatlán School of Higher Studies (FES Acatlán) of the National Autonomous University of Mexico in Naucalpan, State of Mexico, and competes in the Organización Nacional Estudiantil de Fútbol Americano (National Student Organization of American Football), Mexico's college football governing body. Established in 1978 as Osos, the team has won one National Championship, in 1987, and four conference championships in 1983, 1999, 2003 and 2013.

== History ==
=== Early years as Osos ===
The team was established in 1978 as Osos Coatlicue, honoring Cōātlīcue, the Aztec goddess of Earth, Nature, Fertility, Life and Death. The Osos were the first team to represent the National Autonomous University of Mexico (UNAM) outside of its main campus, specifically the National School of Professional Studies Acatlán (ENEP Acatlán), located in Naucalpan, State of Mexico. Thus, the team's first official name was Osos Cuatlicue ENEP Acatlán. The Osos' colors were those of the UNAM, navy blue and gold, with a shade of gold closer to yellow.

The team debuted in the Organización Nacional Estudiantil de Fútbol Americano (ONEFA) in 1979, playing in the Conferencia Metropolitana (Metropolitan Conference), the top level of college football in Mexico. Led by head coach Carlos Robles Vázquez, the team finished last with a 0–8 record.

In 1981, ONEFA created the Conferencia Nacional (National Conference); the Conferencia Metropolitana remained the top division competing for the national championship, with the new conference serving as a lower tier for promotion. Since the UNAM already had two teams competing in the Conferencia Metropolitana (Cóndores and Águilas Reales), Acatlán was demoted to the Conferencia Nacional.

In 1983, the Osos dropped “Coatlicue” from their name and won the Conferencia Nacional championship, earning promotion to the Conferencia Metropolitana. Coached by Arturo Alonso, the team finished first with a 6–1 record and defeated Ola Verde of the Instituto Politécnico Nacional in the final to claim its first championship.

=== National Champions ===
In 1987, under chead oach Arturo Alonso, Osos Acatlán won their first (and as of 2026 only) National Championship. The team finished fourth in the regular season with a 5–2 record. They upset Pieles Rojas IPN, the regular-season leaders, in the semifinals and defeated Cóndores UNAM 17–10 in the championship game.

=== Pumas Acatlán ===
Pumas Acatlán before a game in 2019

In 1997, Osos Acatlán finished last in the Conferencia de los 10 Grandes (the new name of the Conferencia Metropolitana) and were relegated to the Conferencia Nacional. In 1998, as part of a rebranding and restructuring of the National Autonomous University of Mexico college football programs, the team changed its name to Pumas Acatlán.

Pumas Acatlán won the 1999 Conferencia Nacional championship, defeating Gamos of the Centro Universitario México in the final to earn promotion to the Conferencia de los 10 Grandes. The team finished 6–0 in Group B of the Conferencia Nacional and, in the playoffs, defeated Frailes del Tepeyac in the quarterfinals and Pieles Rojas of the Instituto Politécnico Nacional in the semifinals.

Acatlán finished last in the 2001 Conferencia de los 10 Grandes and was relegated once again to the Conferencia Nacional. The team won the 2003 Conferencia Nacional championship to secure promotion and returned to the Conferencia de los 10 Grandes in 2004. However, after being relegated again in 2006, Acatlán competed in the Conferencia Nacional during the 2007 season.

In 2008, the ONEFA created a new conference, the Conferencia del Centro, positioned between the Conferencia de los 6 Grandes (formerly the Conferencia de los 12 Grandes) and the Conferencia Nacional. The restructuring was driven by discontent from the UNAM and IPN over the competitive imbalance with programs from the Monterrey Institute of Technology and Higher Education (ITESM Monterrey, ITESM CCM, ITESM CEM and ITESM Toluca). Acatlán was promoted to the new Conferencia del Centro. On 18 October, Acatlán suffered a 0–101 defeat to Pumas CU, the largest loss in ONEFA history.

In 2013, Pumas Acatlán won their fourth Conferencia Nacional title under manager Enrique Zapata after defeating the Lobos UAdeC 45–38.

In 2019, Horacio García Aponte, who won the 2017 National Championship with Borregos Toluca, was appointed manager of Pumas Acatlán. In 2021, the team was promoted to the top conference in ONEFA, the Conferencia de los 14 Grandes. In August 2025, Enrique Zapata replaced García Aponte as head coach.

== Championships ==
=== National championships ===
Year	Coach	Record	Opponent	Result
1987	Arturo Alonso	7–2	Cóndores UNAM	W 17–10

=== Conference championships ===
Year	Conference	Coach	Record	Opponent	Result
1983	Conferencia Nacional	Arturo Alonso	8–1	Ola Verde IPN	
1999	Conferencia Nacional	Mario Hernández Verduzco	8–0	Gamos CUM	W 34–22
2003	Conferencia Nacional	Luis Becerril	6–2	Centinelas CGP	W 27–13
2013	Conferencia Nacional	Enrique Zapata	6–2	Lobos UAdeC	W 45–38
