= Estadio La Congeladora =

Stadium in Toluca, Mexico

Coordinates: 19°16′04″N 99°42′17″W

La Congeladora
- Interactive map of La Congeladora
- Location: Toluca, State of Mexico
- Owner: ITESM Toluca
- Capacity: 5,000
- Surface: Artificial turf

Construction
- Opened: 2001

Tenant
- Borregos Salvajes Toluca (2001–present)

Estadio La Congeladora ("The Freezer") is a stadium in Toluca, Mexico, on the campus of the Monterrey Institute of Technology and Higher Education, Toluca. It is primarily used for American football and is the home field of the university's team, Borregos Salvajes Toluca. It holds 5,000 people and was built in 2001.

In April 2014, the stadium was converted from a green artificial turf surface to a blue playing surface provided by Polytan, the first and only colored turf surface in use in Mexican college football.
