= Universidad Anáhuac Cancún =

Roman Catholic university in Mexico

Anáhuac Cancún University Anahuac Cankun
- Motto: Vince In Bono Malum; Lux et veritas (Latin)
- Motto in English: Overcome Evil with Good
- Type: Private
- Established: 2000
- President: Jesús Andrés Quirce
- Students: 4,600
- Location: Cancún, Quintana Roo, Mexico
- Campus: Urban
- Colors: Orange
- Sporting affiliations: ONEFA
- Mascot: Leonel for Anáhuac Lions
- Website: www.anahuaccancun.edu.mx

The Anáhuac Cancún University belongs to the Anahuac University Network, affiliated with the Anahuac University Network (RUA), the international education system of the Legion of Christ, in 18 countries and serving over 100,000 students from kindergarten to graduate school.

The university's program is coordinated with those of European universities. It has foreign students, both under curricula or by an abroad program.

== Name ==
"Anáhuac" means "near the water". The name passed on to the whole network because of the location of the first university in the network, the '"Anáhuac México Norte University" located in the area of Lomas Anáhuac in Interlomas in Mexico City. Symbolically, the name refers to the lake region that gave central place at the Aztec capital: Tenochtitlán, Central America's most populous and largest cultural development, where Mexico City and the university now stand.

== Motto ==
"Vince In Bono Malum", or "Defeat Evil with Good".

== Athletics ==
The school has an American football team, the Leones Anáhuac Cancún, which has competed in ONEFA since 2007. They have won two conference titles in 2009 and 2019.
