= Leones Anáhuac Cancún football =

American football team in Mexico

Leones Anáhuac Cancún
- First season: 2007
- Head coach: Jorge Jiménez Aréchiga; 5th season, 18–4 (.818)
- Location: Cancún, Quintana Roo
- Stadium: Estadio Coliseo Maya (capacity: 5,000)
- League: ONEFA
- Conference: Conferencia Nacional
- Colors: Orange and white

Conference championships
- 2 (Nacional: 1, Sur: 1)
- Rivalries: Potros Salvajes UAEM; Pumas Acatlán; Centinelas CGP; Lobos UAdeC

The Leones Anáhuac Cancún (English: Anáhuac Cancún Lions) represents the Universidad Anáhuac Cancún (UAC) in college football. The Leones compete in the Conferencia Nacional of ONEFA and have won two Conferencia Nacional Championships: in 2009 and 2019. The team plays in the Estadio Coliseo Maya and is coached by Jorge Jiménez Aréchiga.

== History ==
=== Marco Martos era (2006–2018) ===
The Leones Anáhuac Cancún played two exhibition games in 2006 against the Burros Blancos IPN and the Halcones UV. They were admitted into ONEFA the following year, led by former NFL Europe player Marco Martos at head coach.

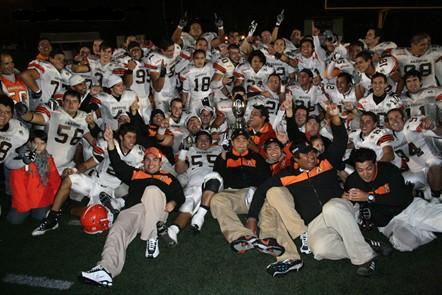
Leones players celebrating their Conferencia Sur championship win in 2009

In 2009, the Leones joined the newly created Conferencia Sur and finished the regular season with a 3–6 record. However, they defeated the Centinelas CGP 12–9 in the semifinals to reach the Conferencia Sur championship game. In the final, the Leones beat the Potros Salvajes UAEM 20–19 for their first title in program history. The Leones achieved their first winning record in 2010, finishing 5–3 in the regular season. The team reached the conference championship game, but they were defeated by the Potros Salvajes UAEM 23–20. In 2011, the Leones were eliminated in the semifinals with a 14–10 loss to the Centinelas CGP.

Following a restructuring of ONEFA, Anáhuac Cancún was moved to the Conferencia Nacional for the 2012 season. Additionally, the team hired legendary coach Jacinto Licea as the program director at the invitation of coach Martos. The Leones finished the regular season with a 6–3 record. However, they suffered a 10–0 loss against the Potros Salvajes UAEM in the semifinals.

The Leones failed to qualify for the playoffs for the first time in 2013 after compiling a 2–7 record. The team suffered a 34–0 defeat to the Halcones UV at home to close out the disappointing season. That offseason, the Universidad Anáhuac Cancún faced financial problems which caused uncertainty about the Leones' future in ONEFA. The rector of the school, Miguel Pérez, met with municipal president Paul Carrillo and municipal sports director José Luis González to reorganize the team and ensure the team's participation in the following season.

In 2014, the Leones finished second in the Conferencia Nacional with an 8–1 regular season record, losing only to the Lobos UAdeC. They defeated the Correcaminos UAT Norte 24–7 in the semifinals. The team had a chance to avenge their earlier loss to the Lobos UAdeC in the championship game, but lost again by a score of 29–22. In 2015, ONEFA scrapped the conference format and instead divided teams into three subgroups, with Anáhuac Cancún being placed in Grupo Blanco. That year, the Leones notably defeated the Águilas Blancas 10–7 in the regular season. Anáhuac Cancún qualified for the expanded playoffs, but they were eliminated in the quarterfinals after a 48–14 defeat to Grupo Verde team Pumas CU. In 2016, the Leones went 3–6 and missed out on the playoffs.

Anáhuac Cancún returned to the playoffs in 2017 after a 4–3 record in the regular season. They were eliminated in the semifinals after suffering a 48–15 defeat to the Potros Salvajes UAEM. In 2018, the Leones finished the regular season undefeated with a 6–0 record, However, they were eliminated in the Grupo Blanco semifinals again, this time after a 35–33 defeat to the Lobos UAdeC. Coach Martos announced his resignation after 13 seasons at Anáhuac Cancún, citing his wish to spend more time with his four children.

=== Jorge Jiménez Aréchiga era (2019–present) ===
The Leones promoted their offensive coordinator, Jorge Jiménez Aréchiga, to replace Martos as the team's head coach in May 2019. They were placed in the Conferencia Nacional, which was recreated by ONEFA after merging Grupo Blanco and Grupo Rojo.

In their first year under coach Jiménez Aréchiga in 2019, the Leones went 7–0 in the regular season and led ONEFA in scoring with 41.9 points per game. The team defeated the Pumas Acatlán 20–13 in the semifinals to set up a matchup against the defending champions, the Lobos UAdeC, in the final. Despite an early injury to star running back Axel Montini in the championship game, quarterback José Rovirosa scored three total touchdowns to lead the team to a 29–21 victory, completing their perfect season and capturing the second conference title in program history. Coach Jiménez Aréchiga dedicated their season to Mario León, an offensive lineman on the team who died prior to the start of the season.

The 2020 ONEFA season was cancelled due to the COVID-19 pandemic in Mexico. For 2021, it was announced that Anáhuac Cancún would be moved to the newly created Conferencia Nacional Centro-Sur and play a shortened four-game season. The Leones opened the season with a 53–0 win over the Toros Salvajes UACh. In their next game, Anáhuac Cancún was defeated 23–20 by the Búhos IPN – their first regular-season loss since 2017. They went on to defeat the Leones Anáhuac Querétaro and the Red Wolves ASUCQ to finish the season with a 3–1 record, though no conference champion was crowned.

In 2022, Anáhuac Cancún finished the regular season with a 6–2 record. However, they were eliminated in the semifinals after a 21–7 defeat to the Lobos UAdeC.

== Championships ==
=== Conference championships ===
Year	Conference	Coach	Record	Opponent	Result
2009	Conferencia Nacional	Marco Martos	5–6	Potros Salvajes UAEM	W 20–19
2019	Conferencia Nacional	Jorge Jiménez Aréchiga	9–0	Lobos UAdeC	W 29–21
