= Arcángeles de Puebla =

Mexican American football team

Logo

General information
- Founded: 23 January 2025; 12 months ago
- Folded: 2026; 0 years ago
- Stadium: El Cráter Azul
- Headquartered: Puebla City, Mexico
- Colors: Green and blue
- Website: ArcangelesdePuebla.com

Personnel
- Owner: Cuauhtémoc Romero Bedolla
- Head coach: Marco Martos

League / conference affiliations
- Liga de Fútbol Americano Profesional

The Arcángeles de Puebla (English: Puebla Archangels) are an American football team based in Puebla City, Puebla, Mexico. The Arcángeles compete in the Liga de Fútbol Americano Profesional (LFA), the top American football league in Mexico. The team plays its home games at the Cráter Azul.

== History ==
On 21 January 2025, it was reported by El Sol de Puebla that an LFA expansion team called the Arcángeles de Puebla would be announced in a forthcoming press conference by league commissioner Alejandro Jaimes. The name was an homage to the Ángeles de Puebla football team and the Ángeles de Puebla basketball team. As expected, the team was officially presented by Jaimes at a press conference in Puebla City two days later, making them the first LFA team to play in the state of Puebla since the Artilleros de Puebla in 2020. Businessman Cuauhtémoc Romero Bedolla was announced as team president while inaugural coaching staff was led by head coach Marco Martos and associate head coach Leonardo Luján. Later that month, the Governor of Puebla, Alejandro Armenta, pledged governmental support for the team.

The coaching staff was later bolstered by defensive associate head coach José Luis Farías, offensive coordinator Juan Wong, offensive line coach Jonathan Alderete, and special teams coordinator Edmundo Soriano, as well as former NFL Europe players like running backs coach Arturo Martínez and defensive assistants Roberto "Gato" Silva and Mauricio "Tyson" López. The first member of the roster was announced as being former Texas Tech player Luis Jaramillo. The Arcángeles held a tryout on 8 February at the Instituto México de Puebla, with 120 prospective players in attendance, and signed 25-year-old defensive tackle Fernando Reyes as a result. The team then signed former ONEFA national champion quarterback Alex García just prior to the 2025 LFA draft, where they selected offensive lineman Abraham Chacón with the first overall pick. Aside from the collegiate draft, the Arcángeles added nine former players from the Galgos de Tijuana and Jefes de Ciudad Juárez in a dispersal draft in early March.

=== Inaugural season ===
The Arcángeles opened their 2025 season with the youngest roster in the LFA, with an average age of 24.4 years old. Standout international signings included running backs Denzel Strong and Joshua Mack, Tongan linemen Douglas Kongaika and Siaosi Finau, and wide receiver Kokaji Kyohei, the first Japanese player in league history. The Tongan players popularized the traditional haka dance at preseason practices. Nonetheless, the Arcángeles featured the highest amount of Mexican players in the league. The team revealed their uniforms and the final roster at an official presentation on 29 April.

The Arcángeles played their inaugural game on 2 May 2025, defeating the Gallos Negros de Querétaro 25–8 at home to kick off the 2025 LFA season, while Denzel Strong scored the first touchdown in franchise history on a second quarter run.

== Stadium ==
Following the announcement of the Arcángeles in January 2025, the Estadio Universitario BUAP, the Estadio Templo del Dolor, the Estadio Ignacio Zaragoza, and even the Estadio Cuauhtémoc were all floated by local media as potential venues for the team. Later that month, the Governor of Puebla, Alejandro Armenta, stated that the team could also play at the newly built Universidad del Deporte. In early February, team president Cuauhtémoc Romero Bedolla announced that the Arcángeles would be playing their inaugural season in the Estadio Ignacio Zaragoza. However, in late March, the team announced that their home stadium had switched to El Cráter Azul, home of the Borregos Salvajes Puebla.

== Media ==
In early April 2025, team president Cuauhtémoc Romero Bedolla announced that Arcángeles games would be broadcast across the state by SICOM Televisión.
