= 2022 Reyes de Jalisco season =

- Head coach: Ernesto Alfaro
- Home stadium: Estadio Tres de Marzo

Results
- Record: 3–3
- Playoffs: Lost Wild Card Playoffs (vs. Raptors) 6–26

The 2022 Reyes de Jalisco season was the Reyes de Jalisco first season in the Liga de Fútbol Americano Profesional (LFA). The team was established on 20 December 2021 as one of the two expansion teams for the 2022 LFA season, the other team being the Galgos de Tijuana. On that same date, Enrique Alfaro, who led the Mayas to the 2016 and 2017 championships, was appointed as head coach. Placekicker Gabriel Amavizca, who previously played for the CFL team Hamilton Tiger-Cats, was the first player signed by the Reyes.

Reyes finished the regular season as the fifth ranked team with a 3–3 record. The Reyes were defeated by the Raptors on the Wild Card round 6–26.

== Draft ==
2022 Reyes de Jalisco draft
Round	Pick	Player	Position	School
1	1	Salvador Cabrera	DB	FES Acatlán
1	4	Alberto Medellín	OL	FES Acatlán
2	8	Rodrigo Jurado	OL	UVM
2	14	César Baeza	LB	IPN
3	15	Jorge Licea	DL	UNAM
4	22	Carlos Farías	QB	ITESM Guadalajara
5	29	Oscar Villagrán	WR	UNAM
6	36	Víctor Acacio	OL	Universidad Siglo XXI
7	43	Pablo Santiago	DL	UAG
8	49	Juan Carlos González	WR	ITESM Guadalajara
9	54	Antonio González	OL	UAG
10	59	Víctor Camacho	OL	UAG
11	63	Juan Francisco Pérez	LB	UAG

== Roster ==
Reyes de Jalisco roster
Quarterbacks: 8 Carlos Farías; 15 Jonathan Mullin; Running backs: 4 Majid Esparza; 16 Misael Salas; 38 Jordon Shippy; 5 Octavio Zatarain; Wide receivers: 2 Rodnell Cruell; 12 Carlos Cuenca; 7 Juan Carlos González; 13 Oswaldo González; 85 Joaquín Granados; 19 Trevin Howard; 17 José Luis Leal; 10 Christopher Reyes; -- Oscar Villagrán; Tight ends: 82 Marcelo Zumalacarregui	Offensive linemen: -- Víctor Acacio; 64 Antonio González; 79 Alberto Medellín; 55 Tavita Hamilton; 77 Rodrigo Jurado; 69 Patricio Murguía; 70 Royer Rosales; 52 Gabriel Sánchez; 51 Erick Valencia; Defensive linemen: 95 Daniel Carreón DT; 9 Zachery Curry; -- Pablo Gómez; 1 Demetrius Harris DE; 11 Jorge Licea; 42 Emmanuel Pérez	Linebackers: -- César Baeza; 25 Caleb Becerra; 40 Víctor Camacho; 44 Adrián Córdoba; 56 Anthony Patrick; -- Juan Francisco Pérez; 30 Saúl Sánchez; Defensive backs: 6 Salvador Cabrera; 28 Andrés Calderón; 3 DeMario Donnell CB; 22 Fernando Hernández; 18 Antranic Lara; 21 Christopher Leo; 23 David Richardson CB; 27 Emiliano Alatorre CB; Special teams: 14 Gabriel Amavizca K
Italics indicate International player Roster updated 15-05-2022

== Staff ==
Reyes de Jalisco staff
Head coach: Head coach – Ernesto Alfaro; Offensive coaches: Offensive coordinator – Carlos Cabral; Running backs – Mauricio Salas; Wide receivers – Saúl Monge; Offensive line – Noel Moreno	Defensive coaches: Defensive coordinator – Gabriel Sánchez; Defensive line – Octavio Martínez; Linebackers – Arturo Esquivel; Defensive backs – Pedro Ramírez

== Regular season ==
=== Standings ===
Liga de Fútbol Americano Profesional
Pos	Team	GP	W	L	PF	PA	Stk	Qualification
1	Dinos	6	5	1	133	75	L1	Advance to playoffs
2	Fundidores	6	4	2	132	111	L1	Advance to playoffs
3	Mexicas	6	4	2	122	90	W3	Advance to playoffs
4	Raptors	6	4	2	137	89	W3	Advance to playoffs
5	Reyes	6	3	3	92	129	W2	Advance to playoffs
6	Gallos Negros	6	1	5	95	109	L5	Advance to playoffs
7	Galgos	6	0	6	46	155	L6	

Source: LFA

=== Schedule ===
Week	Date	Time	Opponent	Result	Record	Venue	TV	Recap
1	5 March	18:00 (UTC–6)	Raptors	L 10–13	0–1	Estadio Tres de Marzo	Marca Claro	Recap
3	19 March	19:00 (UTC–6)	Galgos	W 10–0	1–1	Estadio Tres de Marzo	Marca Claro	Recap
4	26 March	15:00 (UTC–6)	at Mexicas	L 12–46	1–2	Estadio MCA Jaime Labastida (Note: The match between Reyes and Mexicas originally scheduled to be played at Estadio Jesús Martínez "Palillo" changed venues due to poor field conditions after Vive Latino 2022.)	Marca Claro	Recap
5	2 April	19:00 (UTC–6)	at Dinos	L 6–34	1–3	Estadio Francisco I. Madero	Marca Claro	Recap
6	Bye							
2 (Note: The match between Reyes and Gallos Negros originally scheduled for 13 March was postponed due to the Querétaro–Atlas riot.)	16 April	20:00 (UTC–5)	at Gallos Negros	W 19–12	2–3	Estadio Olímpico de Querétaro	Marca Claro	Recap
7	24 April	12:00 (UTC–5)	Fundidores	W 35–24	3–3	Estadio Tres de Marzo	Marca Claro	Recap

== Postseason ==
=== Schedule ===
Round	Date	Time	Opponent	Result	Venue	TV	Recap
Wild Card	1 May	16:00 (UTC–5)	at Raptors	L 6–26	Estadio FES Acatlán	Marca Claro	Recap

== Awards ==
The following Reyes players were awarded at the 2022 LFA Gala.

Player	Position	Award
Demetrius Harris	DL	Defensive Player of the Year
