= 2022 LFA season =

- Duration: 4 March – 24 April

Tazón México V
- Date: 21 May
- Venue: Estadio Caliente, Tijuana
- Champions: Fundidores

LFA seasons seasons
- ~~2021~~ 2023

The 2022 LFA season was the seventh season of operation (sixth season of play) of the Liga de Fútbol Americano Profesional (LFA), the top American football league in Mexico. The regular season began on 4 March and concluded on 24 April, with the playoffs beginning on April 30 and ending with the Tazón México V, on 21 May. The league returned after a two-season hiatus.

Fundidores won their first LFA championship after defeating Gallos Negros 18–14 in the Tazón México V, played in Tijuana.

== Preseason events ==
=== Expansion ===
Two new teams joined the league for the 2022 season: Galgos de Tijuana, based in Tijuana, and Reyes de Jalisco, based in Zapopan, Jalisco. The league also lost one team, Osos de Toluca, that folded in January 2021. With these changes, the 2022 season will be contested by seven teams and, unlike the previous seasons, the league will not be divided into two divisions. As a result, the league decided to expand the playoff field from four teams to six teams. The top two teams will have a bye in the quarterfinals and will host home field in the semifinals.

Condors originally relocated to Querétaro City, and changed its name to Condors de Querétaro, after their acquisition to the ownership group that owned Querétaro F.C. On 3 February 2022, the team officially were rebranded as Gallos Negros de Querétaro. Following the rebrand, the league considers Gallos Negros as a new franchise that began competing in the 2022 season.

=== Stadium changes ===
- Dinos moved to the Estadio Francisco I. Madero after an agreement with the owners of the stadium, the baseball club Saraperos de Saltillo of the Mexican League.
- Mexicas moved from the Estadio Perros Negros to the Estadio Jesús Martínez "Palillo".
- Raptors returned to play their home games in the Estadio FES Acatlán, after playing in the Estadio José Ortega Martínez for the previous two seasons.

=== Draft ===
2022 LFA Draft
Rnd.	Pick No.	LFA Team	Player	Pos.	School	Notes
1	1	Reyes	Salvador Cabrera	DB	FES Acatlán	
1	2	Fundidores	Emilio Pérez	OL	FES Acatlán	From Galgos
1	3	Raptors	Jean Renaud	DB	FES Acatlán	
1	4	Reyes	Alberto García	OL	FES Acatlán	From Fundidores
1	5	Fundidores	Saúl Sauceda	OL	UANL	From Dinos
1	6	Mexicas	Adrián Cuadra	DB	UNAM	From Gallos Negros
1	7	Mexicas	Luis Ceniceros	DL	Anáhuac Norte	
2	8	Reyes	Rodrigo Jurado	OL	UVM	
2	9	Gallos Negros	Gerson Sánchez	OL	IPN	From Galgos
2	10	Raptors	Alfredo Gachuz	K	ITESM CEM	
2	11	Fundidores	Joan Lara	DL	UANL	
2	12	Gallos Negros	Maximiliano Hernández	WR	ITESM Toluca	From Dinos
2	13	Gallos Negros	Luis Enríquez	OL	IPN	
2	14	Reyes	César Baeza	LB	IPN	From Mexicas
3	15	Reyes	Jorge Licea	DL	UNAM	
3	16	Galgos	Isaac Pulido	LB	UABC	
3	17	Raptors	Luis Villegas	WR	ITESM Toluca	
3	18	Gallos Negros	Anthony Baldovinos	DL	IPN	From Fundidores
3	19	Dinos	Marco González	LB	UANL	
3	20	Gallos Negros	Joan Pérez Durán	DB/LB	ITESM Toluca	
3	21	Mexicas	Oliver González	OL	Anáhuac Norte	
4	22	Reyes	Carlos Farías	QB	ITESM Guadalajara	
4	23	Gallos Negros	Marco Cisneros	RB	UNAM	From Galgos
4	24	Raptors	Ulises Colín	RB	IPN	
4	25	Fundidores	Daniel Peña	WR	UANL	
4	26	Dinos	Enrique López	OL	UAC	
4	27	Gallos Negros	José Ruiz	WR	UNAM	
4	28	Mexicas	Chrisstopher González	DB	ITESM Puebla	
5	29	Reyes	Óscar Villagrán	WR	UNAM	
5	30	Galgos	René López	DB	UACH	
5	31	Raptors	Francisco Ornelas	RB	FES Acatlán	
5	32	Fundidores	Juan Garza	LB	ITESM Puebla	
5	33	Dinos	Alan Centeno	OL	ITESM Monterrey	
5	34	Gallos Negros	Alberto Rodríguez	TE	UVM	
5	35	Mexicas	Alejandro Márquez	QB	Anáhuac Norte	

== Teams ==
Team	City	Stadium	Capacity	Head coach
Dinos	Saltillo, Coahuila	Estadio Francisco I. Madero	16,000	(Mexico) Javier Adame
Fundidores	Monterrey, Nuevo León	Estadio Banorte	10,057	(Mexico) Carlos Strevel
Galgos	Tijuana, Baja California	Estadio Caliente	27,333	(Mexico) Guillermo Ruiz Burguete
Gallos Negros	Querétaro City, Querétaro	Estadio Olímpico de Querétaro	4,600	(Mexico) Félix Buendía
Mexicas	Iztacalco, Mexico City	Estadio Jesús Martínez "Palillo"	6,000	(Mexico) Héctor Toxqui
Raptors	Naucalpan, State of Mexico	FES Acatlán	2,000	(Mexico) Guillermo Gutiérrez
Reyes	Zapopan, Jalisco	Estadio Tres de Marzo	18,779	(Mexico) Ernesto Alfaro

== Regular season ==
=== Standings ===
Note: GP = Games played, W = Wins, L = Losses, PF = Points For, PA = Points against

Liga de Fútbol Americano Profesional
Pos	Team	GP	W	L	PF	PA	Stk	Qualification
1	Dinos	6	5	1	133	75	L1	Advance to playoffs
2	Fundidores	6	4	2	132	111	L1	Advance to playoffs
3	Mexicas	6	4	2	122	90	W3	Advance to playoffs
4	Raptors	6	4	2	137	89	W3	Advance to playoffs
5	Reyes	6	3	3	92	129	W2	Advance to playoffs
6	Gallos Negros	6	1	5	95	109	L5	Advance to playoffs
7	Galgos	6	0	6	46	155	L6	

Source: LFA

=== Schedule ===
Week 1
Away	Score	Home	Venue	Date	Time	TV
Gallos Negros	33–9	Galgos	Estadio Caliente	March 4	19:00	Claro Sports
Dinos	10–7	Mexicas	Estadio Jesús Martínez "Palillo"	March 5	15:00	Claro Sports
Raptors	13–10	Reyes	Estadio Tres de Marzo	March 5	18:00	Claro Sports

Week 2
Away	Score	Home	Venue	Date	Time	TV
Fundidores	17–24 (OT)	Dinos	Estadio Francisco I. Madero	March 12	19:00	Claro Sports
Mexicas	10–8	Raptors	Estadio FES Acatlán	March 13	15:00	Claro Sports
Reyes	19–12	Gallos Negros	Estadio Olímpico de Querétaro	April 16 (Note: The match between Reyes and Gallos Negros originally scheduled for 13 March was postponed due to the Querétaro–Atlas riot.)	20:00	Claro Sports

Week 3
Away	Score	Home	Venue	Date	Time	TV
Mexicas	13–27	Fundidores	Estadio Banorte	March 18	20:00	Claro Sports
Gallos Negros	10–24	Dinos	Estadio Francisco I. Madero	March 19	19:00	Claro Sports
Galgos	0–10	Reyes	Estadio Tres de Marzo	March 19	19:00	Claro Sports

Week 4
Away	Score	Home	Venue	Date	Time	TV
Raptors	20–23	Fundidores	Estadio Banorte	March 25	20:00	Claro Sports
Reyes	12–46	Mexicas	Estadio MCA Jaime Labastida (Note: The match between Reyes and Mexicas originally scheduled to be played at Estadio Jesús Martínez "Palillo" changed venues due to poor field conditions after Vive Latino 2022.)	March 26	15:00	Claro Sports
Dinos	14–6	Galgos	Estadio Caliente	March 26	19:00	Claro Sports

Week 5
Away	Score	Home	Venue	Date	Time	TV
Reyes	6–34	Dinos	Estadio Francisco I. Madero	April 2	19:00	Claro Sports
Galgos	0–40	Raptors	Estadio FES Acatlán	April 3	12:00	Claro Sports
Fundidores	13–10	Gallos Negros	Estadio Olímpico de Querétaro	April 3	15:00	

Week 6
Away	Score	Home	Venue	Date	Time	TV
Galgos	9–28	Fundidores	Estadio Banorte	April 8	20:00	Claro Sports
Gallos Negros	11–16	Mexicas	Estadio Jesús Martínez "Palillo"	April 9	15:00	Claro Sports
Dinos	27–28	Raptors	Estadio FES Acatlán	April 10	12:00	Claro Sports

Week 7
Away	Score	Home	Venue	Date	Time	TV
Mexicas	30–22	Galgos	Estadio Caliente	April 22	19:00	Claro Sports
Raptors	28–19	Gallos Negros	Estadio Olímpico de Querétaro	April 23	20:00	Claro Sports
Fundidores	24–35	Reyes	Estadio Tres de Marzo	April 24	12:00	Marca Claro

=== Results ===
Home \ Away	DIN	FUN	GAL	GAN	MEX	RAP	REY
Dinos		24–17		24–10			34–6
Fundidores			28–9		27–13	23–20	
Galgos	8–14			9–33	22–30		
Gallos Negros		10–13				19–28	12–19
Mexicas	7–10			16–11			46–12
Raptors	28–27		40–0		8–10		
Reyes		35–24	10–0			10–13	

Updated to match(es) played on unknown. Source: LFA
Legend: Blue = home team win; Yellow = draw; Red = away team win.

== Regular-season statistical leaders ==
Individual
Scoring leader	Torin Justice	Fundidores	42
Scoring leader	Rubén Zendejas	Mexicas	42
Most Field Goals Made	Enrique Yenny	Dinos	29
Rushing yards	Jordon Shippy	Reyes	457
Passing yards	Shelton Eppler	Fundidores	1,677
Passing touchdowns	Shelton Eppler	Fundidores	15
Interceptions Thrown	Bruno Márquez	Raptors	8
Pass receptions	Rodnell Cruell	Reyes	34
Pass receiving yards	Rodnell Cruell	Reyes	504
Combined yards	Tavarious Battiste	Fundidores	715
Combined tackles	Anthony Patrick	Reyes	50
Interceptions	Enrique Altamirano	Galgos	5
Sacks	Luis Ceniceros	Mexicas	7
Sacks	Demetrius Harris	Reyes	7

== Playoffs ==
=== Playoff bracket ===
Wild Card
4	Raptors	26
5	Reyes	6
3	Mexicas	7
6	Gallos Negros	14

Semifinals
2	Fundidores	30
4	Raptors	27
1	Dinos	20
6	Gallos Negros	27

Tazón México V
2	Fundidores	18
6	Gallos Negros	14

=== Results ===
Wild Card
Away	Score	Home	Venue	Date	Time	TV
Gallos Negros	14–7	Mexicas	Estadio Jesús Martínez "Palillo"	April 30	12:00	Claro Sports
Reyes	6–26	Raptors	Estadio FES Acatlán	May 1	16:00	Claro Sports

Semifinals
Away	Score	Home	Venue	Date	Time	TV
Gallos Negros	27–20	Dinos	Estadio Francisco I. Madero	May 7	19:00	Claro Sports
Raptors	27–30	Fundidores	Estadio Banorte	May 8	18:00	Claro Sports

Tazón México V
Away	Score	Home	Venue	Date	Time	TV
Gallos Negros	14–18	Fundidores	Estadio Caliente	May 21	19:00	Claro Sports

== Tazón México V ==
Tazón México V

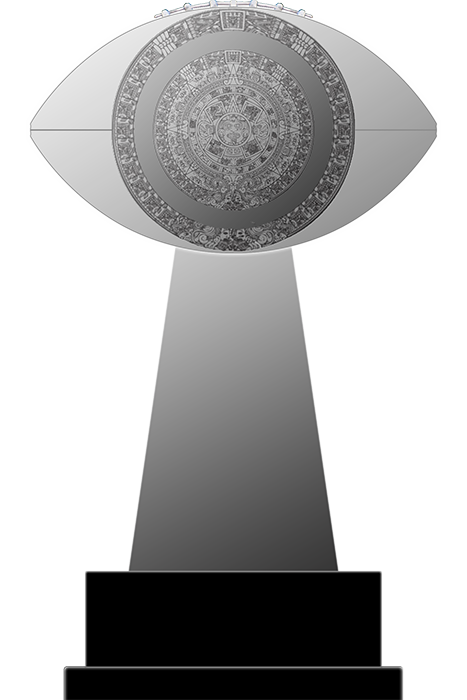

Gallos Negros
vs
Fundidores
(1–5)

(4–2)
14

18
Head Coach:

Head Coach:
Felix Buendia

Carlos Strevel

Teams	1C	2C	3C	4C
Gallos Negros	0	7	0	7
Fundidores	6	3	0	9

Date: 21, May 2022
Kickoff time: 7 p.m.
Stadium: Estadio Caliente
Attendance: 14,000
MVP: Martín Maldonado, DL
Referee: Mario Matos
TV:
Half time show: Nortec:Bostich+Fussible, Pato Machete
← IV • Tazón México • VI →

The Tazón México V was held on 21 May 2022 at the Estadio Caliente in Tijuana. It was the first time the Tazón México was held outside of Mexico City. Fundidores became LFA champions after beating Gallos Negros by a score of 14–18.

Scoring summary

Quarter	Time	Drive			Team	Scoring information	Score	
Quarter	Time	Plays	Yards	TOP	Team	Scoring information	GAN	FUN
1	5:31	1	11	0:06	FUN	Marcelo González 11-yard touchdown run, Ricardo Aguilar kick no good	0	6
2	1:21	—	—	—	GAN	Fumble recovery returned 75 yards for touchdown by Jason Linwood Smith, Alberto González kick good	7	6
2	0:00	3	11	0:13	FUN	45-yard field goal by Aguilar	7	9
4	10:20	14	11	8:51	GAN	Marco García 7-yard touchdown run, González kick good	14	9
4	3:43	15	64	6:27	FUN	Brandon Calzoncit 1-yard touchdown run, 2-point no good	14	15
4	0:38	4	5	0:24	FUN	38-yard field goal by Aguilar	14	18
"TOP" = time of possession. For other American football terms, see Glossary of American football.							14	18

== Awards ==
On 22 February 2023, the league announced the winners of the 2022 season awards.

Award	Winner	(Position)	Team
Most Valuable Player	Shelton Eppler	QB	Fundidores
Offensive Player of the Year	Tavarious Battiste	WR	Fundidores
Defensive Player of the Year	Demetrius Harris	DL	Reyes
Offensive Rookie of the Year	Rubén Zendejas	RB	Mexicas
Defensive Rookie of the Year	Luis Ceniceros	DL	Mexicas
Coach of the Year	Carlos Strevel	Head Coach	Fundidores
Play of the Year	Shelton Eppler, Tavarious Battiste	Walk off touchdown on the final play of the Raptors @ Fundidores semifinal	Fundidores
