= 2022 Dinos de Saltillo season =

Football team season

- Head coach: Javier Adame
- Home stadium: Estadio Francisco I. Madero

Results
- Record: 5–1
- Playoffs: Lost Semifinal (vs. Gallos Negros) 20–27

The 2022 Dinos de Saltillo season was the Dinos de Saltillo sixth season in the Liga de Fútbol Americano Profesional (LFA) and their fourth under head coach Javier Adame. After the 2021 season was cancelled due to the COVID-19 pandemic, the Dinos returned to play in 2022.

After playing for six years in the Estadio Olímpico Francisco I. Madero, the Dinos moved to the Estadio Francisco I. Madero, home to the Mexican League team Saraperos de Saltillo, after an agreement between the two clubs.

Dinos finished the regular season as the first classified team with a 5–1 record. On the last game against the Raptors, Dinos missed the chance to become the first team ever to finish the regular season with a perfect record, when in the last play of the game, Raptors' quarterback Bruno Márquez scored a two point conversion to win the game 28–27.

The Dinos were defeated in the semifinals by the Gallos Negros 20–27.

== Draft ==
2022 Dinos de Saltillo draft
| Round | Pick | Player | Position | School |
|---|---|---|---|---|
| 3 | 19 | Marco Antonio González | LB | UANL |
| 4 | 26 | Enrique López | OL | UAC |
| 5 | 33 | Alan Centeno | DL | ITESM Monterrey |
| 6 | 40 | Erick Niño | QB | UVM |

== Roster ==
Dinos de Saltillo roster
| Quarterbacks: 10 Alejandro Esquer; 17 Erick Niño; 15 Antonio Santana; Running backs: 44 Diego Castillo FB; 1 Omar Cojolum; 23 Joaquín González; 27 Joan Medina; Wide receivers: 3 Gerardo Álvarez; 14 Sergio Barbosa; 18 Fernando Gómez; 6 José Pablo González; 4 James Okike; 22 Gerardo Rendón; 19 Tayviun Royshawn; Tight ends: 12 Sergio Cisneros; 54 Carlos Saldaña | Offensive linemen: 58 René Brassea; 55 Julio Díaz; 79 Jesús Esparza; 59 Enrique López; 56 Diego Morales; 74 Ramiro Pruneda; 53 Mariano Vargas; 51 Erick Zamora; Defensive linemen: 94 Jadarius Ceasar; 9 Félix Guerrero; 99 Pedro Guerrero; 11 Andre Revere DE; 92 Zane Smith; 8 Ricardo Yáñez | Linebackers: 36 Eduardo Camacho; 40 Marco Antonio González; 2 Adrián Martínez; 41 Víctor Sánchez; 16 Cristian Treviño; Defensive backs: 20 Andrés Castro; 25 Erick Cázares; 31 Drew Davis; 7 Guillermo Garza; 29 Rashid Goode; 26 Gustavo Hernández; 28 Alejandro Palos; 21 Jorge Revuelto; 13 Iván Sánchez; 24 Sergio Schiaffino; 5 Osvaldo Zumalacarregui; Special teams: 86 Ricardo Flores K; 6 Rodolfo Ortiz K; 78 Jorge Reyna K; 42 Enrique Yenny K |
Italics indicate International player Roster updated 02-03-2022

== Regular season ==
=== Standings ===
Liga de Fútbol Americano Profesional
| Pos | Team | GP | W | L | PF | PA | Stk | Qualification |
|---|---|---|---|---|---|---|---|---|
| 1 | Dinos | 6 | 5 | 1 | 133 | 75 | L1 | Advance to playoffs |
| 2 | Fundidores | 6 | 4 | 2 | 132 | 111 | L1 | Advance to playoffs |
| 3 | Mexicas | 6 | 4 | 2 | 122 | 90 | W3 | Advance to playoffs |
| 4 | Raptors | 6 | 4 | 2 | 137 | 89 | W3 | Advance to playoffs |
| 5 | Reyes | 6 | 3 | 3 | 92 | 129 | W2 | Advance to playoffs |
| 6 | Gallos Negros | 6 | 1 | 5 | 95 | 109 | L5 | Advance to playoffs |
| 7 | Galgos | 6 | 0 | 6 | 46 | 155 | L6 | |

Source: LFA

=== Schedule ===
| Week | Date | Time | Opponent | Result | Record | Venue | TV | Recap |
|---|---|---|---|---|---|---|---|---|
| 1 | 5 March | 15:00 (UTC–6) | at Mexicas | W 10–7 | 1–0 | Estadio Jesús Martínez "Palillo" | Marca Claro | Recap |
| 2 | 12 March | 19:00 (UTC–6) | Fundidores | W 24–17 (OT) | 2–0 | Estadio Francisco I. Madero | Marca Claro | Recap |
| 3 | 19 March | 19:00 (UTC–6) | Gallos Negros | W 24–10 | 3–0 | Estadio Francisco I. Madero | Marca Claro | Recap |
| 4 | 19 March | 19:00 (UTC–8) | at Galgos | W 14–8 | 4–0 | Estadio Caliente | Marca Claro | Recap |
| 5 | 2 April | 19:00 (UTC–6) | Reyes | W 34–6 | 5–0 | Estadio Francisco I. Madero | Marca Claro | Recap |
| 6 | 10 April | 12:00 (UTC–5) | at Raptors | L 27–28 | 5–1 | Estadio FES Acatlán | Marca Claro | Recap |
| 7 | Bye | | | | | | | |

== Postseason ==
=== Schedule ===
| Round | Date | Time | Opponent | Result | Venue | TV | Recap |
|---|---|---|---|---|---|---|---|
| Semifinals | 7 May | 19:00 (UTC–5) | Gallos Negros | L 20–27 | Estadio Francisco I. Madero | Marca Claro | Recap |
