= 2022 Mexicas de la Ciudad de México season =

- Head coach: Héctor Toxqui
- Home stadium: Estadio Jesús Martínez "Palillo"

Results
- Record: 4–2
- Playoffs: Lost Wild Card Playoffs (vs. Gallos Negros) 7–14

The 2022 Mexicas de la Ciudad de México season was the Mexicas de la Ciudad de México seventh season in the Liga de Fútbol Americano Profesional (LFA) and their third under head coach Héctor Toxqui. After the 2021 season was cancelled due to the COVID-19 pandemic, the Mexicas returned to play in 2022.

Mexicas finished the regular season as the third ranked team with a 4–2 record. The Mexicas were defeated by the Gallos Negros on the Wild Card round 7–14.

== Draft ==
2022 Mexicas de la Ciudad de México draft
Round	Pick	Player	Position	School
1	6	Adrián Cuadra	DB	UNAM
1	7	Luis Ceniceros	DL	Anáhuac Norte
3	21	Oliver González	OL	Anáhuac Norte
4	28	Christopher González	DB	ITESM Puebla
5	35	Alejandro Márquez	QB	Anáhuac Norte
6	37	Tonatiuh Chagoya	DB	Anáhuac Querétaro
6	42	Aarón García	RB	IPN
7	48	Diego Velasco	WR	Anáhuac Norte
8	53	José Luis Leal	WR	FES Acatlán
9	58	Roberto Vázquez	OL	UVM

== Roster ==
Mexicas de la Ciudad de México roster
Quarterbacks: 13 Brandon López; 6 Alejandro Márquez; 5 Ricardo Quintana; Running backs: 23 Aarón García; 30 Mario Salgado; 21 Jesús Sosa; 40 Rubén Zendejas; Wide receivers: 2 Christian Gómez; 16 Eduardo Jiménez; 14 Mario Ortiz; 19 Edgar Rincón; 17 Ditter Smith; 11 Diego Velasco; 84 Guillermo Villalobos; Tight ends: 56 Sergio Soriano	Offensive linemen: 65 Eduardo Aguirre; 43 Freddy Alvarado; 77 Daniel Concepción; 61 Ulises Espinosa; 79 Oliver González; 59 Christopher Morga; 75 Abel Oxamendi; 73 Jonathan Segura; 72 Roberto Vázquez; Defensive linemen: 94 Fernando Bermúdez; 55 Luis Ceniceros; 44 Rashad Dillard; 98 Jorge Gamboa; 92 Diego Magaña; 12 César Pérez; 99 Hiram Ramírez; 31 Diego Ruiz	Linebackers: 8 Miguel Ángel Canseco; 1 Diego Oliva; 54 Lennin Ortiz; 7 José Santana; 52 Federico Solís; Defensive backs: 32 Jerónimo Arzate CB; 22 Tonatiuh Chagoya FS; 26 Adrián Cuadra S; 24 Ulises Barba CB; 10 Andrés Gómez; 4 Gerardo Ramírez CB; 3 Ricardo Razo SS; 27 César Torres; Special teams: 9 Javier Ochoa K; 20 Samuel Reyes K
Italics indicate International player Roster updated 03-04-2022

== Regular season ==
=== Standings ===
Liga de Fútbol Americano Profesional
Pos	Team	GP	W	L	PF	PA	Stk	Qualification
1	Dinos	6	5	1	133	75	L1	Advance to playoffs
2	Fundidores	6	4	2	132	111	L1	Advance to playoffs
3	Mexicas	6	4	2	122	90	W3	Advance to playoffs
4	Raptors	6	4	2	137	89	W3	Advance to playoffs
5	Reyes	6	3	3	92	129	W2	Advance to playoffs
6	Gallos Negros	6	1	5	95	109	L5	Advance to playoffs
7	Galgos	6	0	6	46	155	L6	

Source: LFA

=== Schedule ===
Week	Date	Time	Opponent	Result	Record	Venue	TV	Recap
1	5 March	15:00 (UTC–6)	Dinos	L 7–10	0–1	Estadio Jesús Martínez "Palillo"	Marca Claro	Recap
2	13 March	15:00 (UTC–6)	at Raptors	W 10–8	1–1	Estadio FES Acatlán	Marca Claro	Recap
3	18 March	20:00 (UTC–6)	at Fundidores	L 13–27	1–2	Estadio Banorte	Marca Claro	Recap
4	26 March	15:00 (UTC–6)	Reyes	W 46–12	2–2	Estadio MCA Jaime Labastida (Note: The match between Reyes and Mexicas originally scheduled to be played at Estadio Jesús Martínez "Palillo" changed venues due to poor field conditions after Vive Latino 2022.)	Marca Claro	Recap
5	Bye							
6	9 April	15:00 (UTC–5)	Gallos Negros	W 16–11	3–2	Estadio Jesús Martínez "Palillo"	Marca Claro	Recap
7	22 April	19:00 (UTC–7)	at Galgos	W 30–22	4–2	Estadio Caliente	Marca Claro	Recap

== Postseason ==
=== Schedule ===
Round	Date	Time	Opponent	Result	Venue	TV	Recap
Wild Card	30 April	12:00 (UTC–5)	Gallos Negros	L 7–14	Estadio Jesús Martínez "Palillo"	Marca Claro	Recap

== Awards ==
The following Mexicas players were awarded at the 2022 LFA Gala.

Player	Position	Award
Rubén Zendejas	RB	Offensive Rookie of the Year
Luis Ceniceros	DL	Defensive Rookie of the Year
