= 2022 Fundidores de Monterrey season =

- Head coach: Carlos Strevel
- Home stadium: Estadio Banorte

Results
- Record: 4–2
- Playoffs: Won Semifinal (vs. Raptors) 30–27; Won Tazón México V (vs. Gallos Negros) 18–14

The 2022 Fundidores de Monterrey season is the Fundidores de Monterrey sixth season in the Liga de Fútbol Americano Profesional (LFA) and their third under head coach Carlos Strevel. After the 2021 season was cancelled due to the COVID-19 pandemic, the Fundidores returned to play in 2022.

Fundidores finished the regular season as the second ranked team with a 4–2 record. The Fundidores defeated the Raptors on the semifinal 30–27 with a touch down pass from Shelton Eppler to Tavarious Battiste on the last play of the game.

The Fundidores won the Tazón México V against the Gallos Negros de Querétaro 18–14, on 21 May, winning their first LFA championship.

== Draft ==
2022 Fundidores de Monterrey draft
Round	Pick	Player	Position	School
1	2	Emilio Pérez	OL	FES Acatlán
1	5	Saúl Sauceda	OL	UANL
2	11	Joan Lara	DL	UANL
4	25	Daniel Peña	WR	UANL
5	32	Juan Garza	LB	ITESM Puebla
6	39	José Salas	OL	ITESM CEM
7	46	Byron Reyes	RB	ITESM Toluca

== Roster ==
Fundidores de Monterrey roster
Quarterbacks: 8 Shelton Eppler; 16 Erick Luján; Running backs: 24 Brandon Calzoncit; 22 Adrián Flores; 29 Marcelo González; 34 Rubén Martínez; 32 Roger Thomas; Wide receivers: 4 Tavarious Battiste; 14 Luis de la Torre; 15 Torin Justice; 85 Daniel Peña; 6 Fernando Richarte; 83 Marco Antonio Sosa; 84 Marco Treviño	Offensive linemen: 74 Saúl Aguilar; 54 Rickey Benson Jr.; 68 Ismael Betancourt; 55 Edgar Cortés; 53 Fernando Cuevas; 81 Juan Pablo Garza; 73 Luis Enrique Luna; 64 Kevin Martínez; 58 Emilio Pérez; 69 Saúl Sauceda; 80 Gerardo Treviño; Defensive linemen: 92 Javier Alejandro; 78 Guillermo Calderón; 90 Joan Lara; 3 Uriel Martínez; 2 Itan Salas; 97 Artur Pinheiro; 7 Andrew Salas DE	Linebackers: 10 Óscar Escalante; 11 Ashari Goins; 45 Lázaro Guajardo; 5 Christian Hernández; 49 Félix Macías; 40 Pedro Villarreal; Defensive backs: 25 Diego Avendaño; 20 Fabrizio de León; 13 Carlos Escalante; 21 Javier García; 9 Patricio Garza; 18 Cosme Lozano S; 23 Javier Sánchez; 17 Sebastián Sierra; Special teams: 19 Ricardo Aguilar K/P; 28 Oscar Silva K/P
Italics indicate International player Roster updated 02-03-2022

== Regular season ==
=== Standings ===
Liga de Fútbol Americano Profesional
Pos	Team	GP	W	L	PF	PA	Stk	Qualification
1	Dinos	6	5	1	133	75	L1	Advance to playoffs
2	Fundidores	6	4	2	132	111	L1	Advance to playoffs
3	Mexicas	6	4	2	122	90	W3	Advance to playoffs
4	Raptors	6	4	2	137	89	W3	Advance to playoffs
5	Reyes	6	3	3	92	129	W2	Advance to playoffs
6	Gallos Negros	6	1	5	95	109	L5	Advance to playoffs
7	Galgos	6	0	6	46	155	L6	

Source: LFA

=== Schedule ===
Week	Date	Time	Opponent	Result	Record	Venue	TV	Recap
1	Bye							
2	12 March	19:00 (UTC–6)	at Dinos	L 17–24 (OT)	0–1	Estadio Francisco I. Madero	Marca Claro	Recap
3	18 March	20:00 (UTC–6)	Mexicas	W 27–13	1–1	Estadio Banorte	Marca Claro	Recap
4	25 March	20:00 (UTC–6)	Raptors	W 23–20	2–1	Estadio Banorte	Marca Claro	Recap
5	3 April	15:00 (UTC–5)	at Gallos Negros	W 13–10	3–1	Estadio Olímpico de Querétaro	Marca Claro	Recap
6	8 April	20:00 (UTC–5)	Galgos	W 28–9	4–1	Estadio Banorte	Marca Claro	Recap
7	24 April	12:00 (UTC–5)	at Reyes	L 24–35	4–2	Estadio Tres de Marzo	Marca Claro	Recap

== Postseason ==
=== Schedule ===
Round	Date	Time	Opponent	Result	Venue	TV	Recap
Semifinals	8 May	18:00 (UTC–5)	Raptors	W 30–27	Estadio Banorte	Marca Claro	Recap
Tazón México V	21 May	19:00 (UTC–7)	Gallos Negros	W 18–14	Estadio Caliente	Marca Claro	Recap

== Awards ==
The following Fundidores players were awarded at the 2022 LFA Gala.

Player	Position	Award
Shelton Eppler	QB	Most Valuable Player
Tavarious Battiste	WR	Offensive Player of the Year
Carlos Strevel	HC	Coach of the Year

== Statistics ==
=== Offensive leaders ===
Stat	Player	Position	Value	LFA Rank
Passing yards	Shelton Eppler	QB	1,677	1st
Rushing yards	Brandon Calzoncit	RB	184	9th
Receiving yards	Tavarious Battiste	WR	496	2nd
Scoring	Ricardo Aguilar	K	28	3rd
Combined yards	Tavarious Battiste	WR	715	1st

=== Defensive leaders ===
Stat	Player	Position	Value	LFA Rank
Sacks	Uriel Martínez	DL	5.5	3rd
Tackles	Ashari Goins	LB	37.5	4th
Interceptions	Javier García	DB	3	3rd
