= 2022 Galgos de Tijuana season =

Football team season

- Head coach: Guillermo Ruiz Burguete
- Home stadium: Estadio Caliente

Results
- Record: 0–6
- Playoffs: Did not qualify

The 2022 Galgos de Tijuana season was the Galgos de Tijuana first season in the Liga de Fútbol Americano Profesional (LFA). The team debuted in the league under head coach Guillermo Ruiz Burguete, who had previous experience in the league as head coach of the Dinos de Saltillo during the 2017 LFA season. Galgos ended the 2022 season with a 0–6 record, becoming the first LFA team to finish a season with no wins.

== Draft ==
2022 Galgos de Tijuana draft
Round	Pick	Player	Position	School
3	16	Isaac Pulido	LB	UABC
5	30	René López	DB	UACH
7	44	Alejandro Meléndez	QB	UABC
8	50	Francisco Guzmán	DB	UABC
9	55	Rogelio Navarro	DB	UABC
10	60	Frank Quezada	OL	UABC

== Roster ==
Galgos de Tijuana roster
Quarterbacks: 4 Luis Araujo; 34 Armando Ledesma; 14 Alejandro Meléndez; 18 Diego Ruiz; Running backs: 33 Mike Garza; 11 Alejandro Mendoza; 1 Isaiah Sombrite; 21 Héctor Villavicencio; Wide receivers: 3 Anthony Benson; 12 Guillermo Borja; 83 Alberto Lemus; 2 Oscar Lizárraga; 15 Alejandro Martínez; 13 Carlos Santillano; 6 Cody Smith; Tight ends: 87 Osmar Marentes	Offensive linemen: 63 Saúl Alfaro; 75 José Carpio; 55 Edgar Cavazos; 56 Cris Lira; 53 Emmanuel López; 50 Mario Ojeda; 77 Frank Quezada; 69 William Rivera; 52 Gustavo Romo; 51 Samuel Tapia; Defensive linemen: 99 Luis Álvarez; 20 Jonathan Arellano; 92 Diego Ibarra; 91 Eli Leal; 98 David Mendoza; 89 Fidencio Morán; 90 Jorge Ortiz; 97 Carlos Ríos; 94 Luis Octavio Valencia	Linebackers: 5 Oscar Leal; 5 Isaac Pulido; 45 Omar Romero; 58 Carlos Solís; Defensive backs: 8 Enrique Altamirano; 7 Fabio González; 31 Francisco Guzmán; 30 Ronald Hicks; 32 René López; 25 Rogelio Navarro; 24 Jorge Pizano; 44 John Rincón; 27 Raúl Romero; 10 Emanuel Serna; Special teams: 19 Paul Ortiz K
Italics indicate International player Roster

== Regular season ==
=== Standings ===
Liga de Fútbol Americano Profesional
Pos	Team	GP	W	L	PF	PA	Stk	Qualification
1	Dinos	6	5	1	133	75	L1	Advance to playoffs
2	Fundidores	6	4	2	132	111	L1	Advance to playoffs
3	Mexicas	6	4	2	122	90	W3	Advance to playoffs
4	Raptors	6	4	2	137	89	W3	Advance to playoffs
5	Reyes	6	3	3	92	129	W2	Advance to playoffs
6	Gallos Negros	6	1	5	95	109	L5	Advance to playoffs
7	Galgos	6	0	6	46	155	L6	

Source: LFA

=== Schedule ===
Week	Date	Time	Opponent	Result	Record	Venue	TV	Recap
1	4 March	19:00 (UTC–8)	Gallos Negros	L 9–33	0–1	Estadio Caliente	Marca Claro	Recap
2	Bye							
3	19 March	19:00 (UTC–6)	at Reyes	L 0–10	0–2	Estadio Tres de Marzo	Marca Claro	Recap
4	19 March	19:00 (UTC–8)	Dinos	L 8–14	0–3	Estadio Caliente	Marca Claro	Recap
5	3 April	12:00 (UTC–5)	at Raptors	L 0–40	0–4	Estadio FES Acatlán	Marca Claro	Recap
6	8 April	20:00 (UTC–5)	at Fundidores	L 9–28	0–5	Estadio Banorte	Marca Claro	Recap
7	22 April	19:00 (UTC–7)	Mexicas	L 22–30	0–6	Estadio Caliente	Marca Claro	Recap
