= 2026 Munich Ravens season =

American football team in Germany

- Owner: Thomas Krohne
- General manager: Sean Shelton
- Head coach: Kendral Ellison
- Offensive coordinator: Kyle Callahan
- Defensive coordinator: Kendral Ellison
- Home stadium: Sportpark Unterhaching

Results
- Record: 9-1
- League place: 2
- Playoffs: Won Semi final vs. Frankfurt Galaxy; Lost Championship Game vs. Nordic Storm

The 2026 Munich Ravens season is the fourth season of the Munich Ravens in the inaugural season of the European Football Alliance (EFA).

After several teams split from the European League of Football (ELF) after the 2025 season, the Ravens joined the newly founded European Football Alliance on 9 February 2026.

== Preseason ==
In early October Munich Ravens confirmed nine players from the 2025 season already committed for 2026, including Quarterback Russell Tabor. In mid February 2026 Director of Sports Sean Shelton was promoted to General Manager.

== Regular season ==
=== Standings ===
Pos	Team	Pld	W	L	PF	PA	PD	Qualification
1	z – Nordic Storm	10	9	1	411	141	+270	Qualification to BIG4
2	x – Munich Ravens	10	9	1	396	228	+168	Qualification to BIG4
3	x – Frankfurt Galaxy	10	4	6	233	313	−80	Qualification to BIG4
4	x – Paris Musketeers	10	4	6	215	300	−85	Qualification to BIG4
5	e – Raiders Tirol	10	2	8	264	362	−98	
6	e – Prague Lions	10	2	8	223	398	−175	

Source: European Leagues Football Data Lab

Tiebreaker: Total Wins, Winning Percentage, Head-to-Head Record, Strength of Victory (SOV), Total Points Differential (capped at ±35 points per game), Total Points Scored, Points Differential in Head-to-Head Games, Away Wins, Coin Toss.
Legend

x — Clinched playoff berth
z — Clinched regular season winner
e — Eliminated from playoffs

=== Schedule ===
Week	Date	Opponent	Result	Record	Venue	Att.	Recap
1	May 17	vs Raiders Tirol	58-30	1-0	Grünwalder Stadion, Munich	5,175	
2	bye						
3	May 30	at Frankfurt Galaxy	45-26	2-0	PSD Bank Arena, Frankfurt	4,581	
4	June 6	at Paris Musketeers	41-7	3-0	Stade Bauer, Saint-Ouen	2,882	
5	June 14	vs Prague Lions	45-13	4-0	Uhlsport Park, Unterhaching	3,161	
6	bye						
7	June 28	vs Nordic Storm	37-34	5-0	Uhlsport Park, Unterhaching	2,772	
8	July 4	at Raiders Tirol	32-24	6-0	Tivoli Stadion Tirol, Innsbruck	3,076	
9	July 12	vs Frankfurt Galaxy	39-5	7-0	Uhlsport Park, Unterhaching	3,265	
10	July 18	at Prague Lions	48-12	8-0	FK Viktoria Stadion, Prague		
11	bye						
12	August 2	vs Paris Musketeers	45-22	9-0	Uhlsport Park, Unterhaching	4,329	
13	August 8	at Nordic Storm	7-55	9-1	Gladsaxe Stadion, Søborg	3,113	

== Playoffs ==
Round	Date	Opponent	Result	Venue	Att.	Recap
Big 4	August 15	Frankfurt Galaxy	52-33	BBBank Arena, Frankfurt	4,094	
Championship Game	August 29	Nordic Storm	28-48	Tivoli Stadion Tirol, Innsbruck	4,157	

== Roster ==
Munich Ravens roster
Quarterbacks: 9 Russell Tabor (United States); 17 Levin Adrom (Germany); Running backs: 5 Justus Seelig (Germany); 26 Benedikt Pohler (Germany); 32 Dominik Waase (Germany); 33 Justin Rodney (Germany); Wide receivers: 1 Sixten Dragan (Germany); 3 Malik Stanley (United States); 6 Jannik Nowak (Germany); 7 Louis Geyer (Germany); 12 Dominik Hörner (Germany); 13 Marvin Rutsch (Germany); 14 Konstantin Stricker (Germany); 81 Leo Casin (Germany); 82 Julian Kelic (Germany); 84 Michael Stadler (Germany); 88 Anton Chereminskiy (Russia); 89 Paul Stockfleth (Germany); Tight ends: 0 Philip Okonkwo (Germany); 86 Lutz Hauptvogel (Germany); 87 Fabian Rolfes (Germany)	Offensive linemen: 50 Tobias Vorreiter (Germany); 53 Dominik Ondra (Germany); 54 Marlon Wethmann (Germany); 55 Chinazo Obobi (United Kingdom); 57 Harry Sayer (United Kingdom); 60 Sebastian Schreiner (Germany); 63 Nouredin Nouili (Germany); 68 Ange Obonga (Republic of the Congo); 69 Robin Still (Germany); 72 Simon Hugger (Germany); 75 Tassilo Wagner (Germany); 77 Dino Sadikovic (Germany); 79 Gerrit Brandt (Germany); Defensive linemen: 8 Etuale Lui (New Zealand); 15 Johannes Zirngibl (Germany); 19 Sadik Busch (Germany); 31 Joseph Darkwa (Germany); 51 Jonas Schwaiger (Germany); 58 Diego Emmanuel (Germany); 90 Julius Richter (Germany); 91 Leon Weber (Germany); 95 Marius Bindl (Germany); 99 Hiswill Awuah (Germany)	Linebackers: 4 Alex Raich (Switzerland); 30 Jan Bender (Germany); 35 Jonas Maier (Germany); 40 Luis Strobel (Germany); 41 Luca Maier (Germany); 44 Maleka Mbala (Germany); 47 Dominik Schmid (Germany); 52 Wael Nasri (France); 56 Franz Tiefenbacher (Germany); Defensive backs: 2 Christoph Nitzlnader (Austria); 10 Tony Anderson (France); 11 Divine Buckrham (United States); 20 Rachid Ali-Tagba (Germany); 21 Bijon Harris (United States); 22 Marcos Schlabitz (Germany); 23 Nikita Chereminksiy (Germany); 24 Jonas Gürntke (Germany); 25 Paul Robl (Germany); 27 Issac Mbra (Germany); 28 Eric Köhncke (Germany); Special teams: 18 Daniel Schweiger (Germany)	Rookies in italics Roster updated 5 June 2026; 4 A-import, 6 E-import, 50 homegrown 65 active
