= 2022 Raptors de Naucalpan season =

- Head coach: Guillermo Gutiérrez
- Home stadium: Estadio FES Acatlán

Results
- Record: 4–2
- Playoffs: Lost Semifinal (vs. Fundidores) 27–30

The 2022 Raptors de Naucalpan season was the Raptors de Naucalpan seventh season in the Liga de Fútbol Americano Profesional (LFA) and their fifth under head coach Guillermo Gutiérrez. After the 2021 season was cancelled due to the COVID-19 pandemic, the Raptors returned to play in 2022.

Raptors finished the regular season as the fourth ranked team with a 4–2 record. The Raptors were defeated by the Fundidores on the semifinal 27–30 with a touchdown pass from Shelton Eppler to Tavarious Battiste on the last play of the game.

The Raptors returned to play their home games in the Estadio FES Acatlán, after playing in the Estadio José Ortega Martínez for the previous two seasons.

== Draft ==
2022 Raptors de Naucalpan draft
Round	Pick	Player	Position	School
1	3	Jean Retaud	DB	FES Acatlán
2	10	Alfredo Gachuz	K	ITESM CEM
3	17	Alberto Villegas	WR	ITESM Toluca
4	24	Ulises Colín	RB	IPN
5	31	Francisco Ornelas	RB	FES Acatlán
6	38	Saúl Valencia	DB	Anáhuac Norte
7	45	José Bárcenas	FB	IPN
8	51	Edgar Velázquez	WR	FES Acatlán
9	56	Baruch Rivera	WR	UVM
10	61	José Corona	OL	FES Acatlán

== Roster ==
Raptors de Naucalpan roster
Quarterbacks: 9 Norman Contla; 13 Bruno Márquez; Running backs: 33 Edgar Arroyo; 3 Dan Ávila; 28 Germán Maldonado; Wide receivers: 86 Enrique Barraza; 19 Manuel Barrios; 29 Brian Burnett Jr.; 15 Marco Camacho; 16 Iván García; 4 Humberto Noriega; 84 Kento Suzuki; 14 Alberto Villegas; 80 Diego Yáñez; Tight ends: 22 Arturo Miranda	Offensive linemen: 53 Abraham Assenato; 76 José Corona; 51 Leonardo Galindo; 52 Enrique González; 78 Darío Martínez; 58 Julio Nava; 61 Mario Rodríguez; 54 Josué Torres; Defensive linemen: 43 Raúl Arnaiz; 55 César Canabal; 91 David Casarrubias; 93 Pablo Casas; 17 Francisco Espinoza; 94 Juan González DE; 7 Óscar Meza; 95 Alan Retaud; 99 Carlos Velarde	Linebackers: 40 Jovanni Carrillo; 6 Gonzalo de la Rosa III; 34 Andrés Espinosa; 26 Daniel González; 1 José Luis Meza; 27 Michelle Pasillas; 2 Francisco Ramírez; 50 Edgar White; Defensive backs: 11 Erick Arzate; 8 Karrheem Darrington S; 37 Manuel Hernández S; 18 Raúl Mateos; 23 Gustavo Oróstico CB; 21 Jean Retaud CB; 30 David Rico CB; 10 Jordi Saldaña; 25 Saúl Valencia CB; Special teams: 83 Eduardo Retana K
Italics indicate International player Roster updated 03-04-2022

== Regular season ==
=== Standings ===
Liga de Fútbol Americano Profesional
Pos	Team	GP	W	L	PF	PA	Stk	Qualification
1	Dinos	6	5	1	133	75	L1	Advance to playoffs
2	Fundidores	6	4	2	132	111	L1	Advance to playoffs
3	Mexicas	6	4	2	122	90	W3	Advance to playoffs
4	Raptors	6	4	2	137	89	W3	Advance to playoffs
5	Reyes	6	3	3	92	129	W2	Advance to playoffs
6	Gallos Negros	6	1	5	95	109	L5	Advance to playoffs
7	Galgos	6	0	6	46	155	L6	

Source: LFA

=== Schedule ===
Week	Date	Time	Opponent	Result	Record	Venue	TV	Recap
1	5 March	18:00 (UTC–6)	at Reyes	W 13–10	1–0	Estadio Tres de Marzo	Marca Claro	Recap
2	13 March	15:00 (UTC–6)	Mexicas	L 8–10	1–1	Estadio FES Acatlán	Marca Claro	Recap
3	Bye							
4	25 March	20:00 (UTC–6)	at Fundidores	L 20–23	1–2	Estadio Banorte	Marca Claro	Recap
5	3 April	12:00 (UTC–5)	Galgos	W 40–0	2–2	Estadio FES Acatlán	Marca Claro	Recap
6	10 April	12:00 (UTC–5)	Dinos	W 28–27	3–2	Estadio FES Acatlán	Marca Claro	Recap
7	23 April	20:00 (UTC–5)	at Gallos Negros	W 28–19	4–2	Estadio Olímpico de Querétaro	Marca Claro	Recap

== Postseason ==
=== Schedule ===
Round	Date	Time	Opponent	Result	Venue	TV	Recap
Wild Card	1 May	16:00 (UTC–5)	Reyes	W 26–6	Estadio FES Acatlán	Marca Claro	Recap
Semifinals	8 May	18:00 (UTC–5)	at Fundidores	L 27–30	Estadio Banorte	Marca Claro	Recap
