= Juan Robles =

Juan Robles may refer to:

- Juan Robles (footballer) (born 2003), Mexican footballer
- Juan Carlos Robles (born 1967), Spanish volleyball player
- Juan Manuel Robles (born 1978), Peruvian writer
- Juanito (footballer, born 1980) (Juan Jesús Gutiérrez Robles), Spanish footballer
