= Zirngibl =

Zirngibl is a German surname. Notable people with the surname include:

- Johannes Zirngibl (born 1999), German football defensive end
- Werner Zirngibl (born 1958), German tennis player
