= Galgos de Tijuana =

Mexican American football team

Logo

General information
- Founded: 17 November 2021; 4 years ago
- Folded: 2025; 1 year ago
- Stadium: Estadio Caliente
- Headquartered: Tijuana, Mexico
- Colours: Black, red and white

Personnel
- Owner: Grupo Caliente
- Head coach: Mauricio Loya

League / conference affiliations
- Liga de Fútbol Americano Profesional

The Galgos de Tijuana (English: Tijuana Greyhounds) was an American football team based in Tijuana, Mexico. The Galgos competed in the Liga de Fútbol Americano Profesional (LFA), the top American football league in Mexico. The team played its home games at Estadio Caliente.

== History ==
On 9 November 2021, LFA commissioner Alejandro Jaimes announced a franchise in Tijuana would be joining the Reyes de Jalisco as one of the two expansion teams ahead of the 2022 season. The Galgos de Tijuana were established on 17 November, revealing their name, logo and uniforms. The project was undertaken in part by Grupo Caliente, owners of Club Tijuana. Guillermo Ruiz Burguete was announced as the first head coach while wide receiver Luis Araujo was their "franchise player". The first tryout was held at the Centro de Enseñanza Técnica y Superior, Tijuana campus just a few days later, with over 100 player attending. The inaugural roster included 17 players from colleges in Tijuana, three from Ensenada and three from Mexicali.

The Galgos played their first game on 4 March 2022, kicking off the 2022 season against fellow expansion team Gallos Negros de Querétaro at Estadio Caliente with a 9–33 loss. Paul Ortíz kicked a first-quarter field goal for the first points in team history, while Alejandro Meléndez threw the team's first-ever touchdown to Cody Smith in the game's closing minutes. Galgos ended the 2022 season with a 0–6 record, becoming the first LFA team to finish a season with no wins.

Ahead of the 2023 LFA season, the Galgos hired Héctor del Águila as their head coach. They also signed former NFL players Trevone Boykin and Terrance Williams. The Galgos achieved their first-ever victory in their season opener, beating the Mexicas de la Ciudad de México 24–6. They improved their record to 5–5, earning a playoff berth for the first time in franchise history. The Galgos suffered a 15–3 defeat to the Reyes de Jalisco in the Wild Card game.

Prior to the 2025 LFA season, Galgos announced that it would not participate in the upcoming season in order to fix its financial issues.

== Season-by-season ==
Season	Head coach	Regular season				Postseason			
Season	Head coach	Won	Lost	Win %	Finish	Won	Lost	Win %	Result
2022	Guillermo Ruiz Burguete	0	6	.000	7th (League)	–	–	–	–
2023	Héctor del Águila	5	5	.500	6th (League)	0	1	.000	Lost to Reyes 3–15
2024	Héctor del Águila	3	5	.375	8th (League)	–	–	–	–
Total		8	16	.333					

== Notable players ==
See Category:Galgos de Tijuana players
