= Carlos Rosado =

Mexican gridiron football player (born 1975)

Profile
- Position: Head coach

Personal information
- Born: 8 September 1975 (age 51); Mexico City, Mexico

Career information
- College: UDLAP
- NFL draft: 1998: undrafted

Career history

Playing
- Barcelona Dragons (1998–2002); New York Jets (2003)*; Amsterdam Admirals (2003–2004)
- * Offseason or practice squad member only

Coaching
- Dinos de Saltillo (?–2019) Wide receivers coach; Dinos de Saltillo (2020–2023) Offensive coordinator; Reyes de Jalisco (2024–2025) Head coach

Career NFL Europe statistics
- Receptions: 64
- Receiving yards: 911
- Receiving touchdowns: 1

Carlos Rosado Vallejo (born 8 September 1975) is a Mexican gridiron football coach and former wide receiver who is the head coach of the Reyes de Jalisco of the Liga de Fútbol Americano Profesional (LFA). He played in NFL Europe for the Barcelona Dragons and the Amsterdam Admirals from 1998 through 2004. He also played preseason with the New York Jets during 2003.

His father, Carlos Rosado Stevens, was a wide receiver for the Águilas Reales de UNAM from 1970 to 1974, and later served as the president of ONEFA, the Mexican college football league, from 2008 to 2011. The younger Rosado began playing the sport at the age of seven. He played college football for the Aztecas UDLAP, winning three consecutive ONEFA national championships between 1995 and 1997. He also earned his degree in business administration.

Coming out of college, Rosado joined the Barcelona Dragons of NFL Europe in 1998 after a pair of successful tryouts. He played seven seasons in the league, becoming the second Mexican national to play in the league. He was named the National (non-American) offensive player of the year in 2003. Rosado was invited to training camp by the New York Jets in 2003, but did not make the final roster.

== Post-playing career ==
Rosado worked as a talent scout for the NFL from 2005 to 2009.

On 1 April 2008, he was named the new Commissioner of ONEFA. He has also worked as color analyst for Fox Sports and has a sportswear shop. In 2010, Rosado was named the athletic director at his alma mater.

Rosado was hired as offensive coordinator of the Dinos de Saltillo of the Liga de Fútbol Americano Profesional (LFA) in 2020, having previously served as the team's wide receivers coach.

In October 2023, Rosado was announced as the head coach of the Reyes de Jalisco, replacing Ernesto Alfaro.
