= Malik Stanley =

American gridiron football player (born 1996)

No. 2 – Munich Ravens
- Position: Wide receiver
- Roster status: Active

Personal information
- Born: June 7, 1997 (age 29); Topeka, Kansas
- Listed height: 6 ft 2.5 in (1.89 m)
- Listed weight: 224.8 lb (102 kg)

Career information
- High school: Shawnee Heights (Tecumseh, Kansas)
- College: South Alabama (2017–2018); Louisiana Tech (2019)
- NFL draft: 2021: undrafted

Career history
- Tucson Sugar Skulls (2021); Panthers Wrocław (2022); Hamburg Sea Devils (2023); Caudillos de Chihuahua (2024); Munich Ravens (2024–present)

Awards and highlights
- Tazón México champion (VII); LFA receptions leader (2024); LFA receiving yards leader (2024); ELF Second-Team All-Star (2022); First-team All-KJCCC (2016)

Malik Edward Stanley (born June 7, 1997) is an American football wide receiver who plays for the Munich Ravens of the European League of Football (ELF). He played college football at South Alabama and Louisiana Tech.

== Early life ==
Stanley attended Shawnee Heights High School in Tecumseh, Kansas, where he played football, basketball and athletics. On the football team, he was playing on offense and defense in his final two years. In his senior year in 2014, he won the region championship with the Thunderbirds and was subsequently named All-League First Team as a defensive back and All-League Second Team as a wide receiver. In addition, he earned All-State honors as a DB.

== College career ==
In 2015, Stanley committed to Coffeyville Community College. As a sophomore, he caught 58 passes for 712 yards and six touchdowns for the Red Ravens, earning first-team All-Kansas Jayhawk Community College Conference honors. Stanley was recruited by the University of South Alabama for the 2017 season. He was expected to redshirt early in the year, but ultimately appeared in ten games (starting nine) and recording 324 receiving yards and three touchdowns. He played four games the following year. For his final year of college, he transferred to Louisiana Tech in 2019, where he was an integral part of the Bulldogs offense with 649 receiving yards and three touchdowns. In the 2019 Independence Bowl, he helped his team to a 14–0 win over the Miami Hurricanes with three receptions for 75 yards. For his efforts, he was named honorable mention All-Conference selection. In March 2021, Stanley participated in his alma mater's Pro Day.

== Professional career ==
For the 2021 Indoor Football League season, Stanley was signed by the Tucson Sugar Skulls. He totaled 82 receiving yards and two touchdowns in eight games. In mid-November, the Sugar Skulls announced Stanley's extension for another season. However, Stanley signed a contract with the Panthers Wrocław from the European League of Football (ELF) in March 2022. On the first day of the game against the Leipzig Kings, Stanley caught his first two touchdowns for the Polish team. He eventually recorded 1,099 receiving yards in twelve games, which ranked third league-wide. He missed the playoffs with the Panthers with a 5-7 losing record. After the regular season, he was selected to the ELF All-Star second team.

For the 2023 ELF season, Stanley joined the Hamburg Sea Devils, where he continued to shine, securing 67 receptions for 924 yards and 9 touchdowns across 14 games. .

Stanley signed with the Caudillos de Chihuahua of the Liga de Fútbol Americano Profesional (LFA) for the 2024 LFA season. That year, he led the league in receptions (46) and receiving yards (685) to go along with seven touchdowns.

On June 19, 2024, Stanley signed to play for the Munich Ravens of the European League of Football (ELF).

=== Professional statistics ===
| Year | Team | GP | GS | Receiving | | | | | |
| Year | Team | GP | GS | Rec | Tgt | Yds | Avg | TD | Lng |
|---|---|---|---|---|---|---|---|---|---|
European League of Football
| 2022 | Panthers Wrocław | 12 | 11 | 87 | 118 | 1099 | 12.6 | 12 | 65 |
| 2023 | Hamburg Sea Devils | 14 | 14 | 67 | 123 | 924 | 13.7 | 9 | 65 |
| ELF total | | 12 | 11 | 87 | 118 | 1099 | 12.6 | 12 | 65 |
Liga de Fútbol Americano Profesional
| 2024 | Caudillos de Chihuahua | 13 | 13 | 46 | 67 | 685 | 14.8 | 7 | |
Source: stats.europeanleague.football
