= Guillermo Ruiz Burguete =

Mexican gridiron football coach (born 1976)

Profile
- Position: Head coach

Personal information
- Born: 24 January 1976 (age 50); Mexico City, Mexico
- Listed height: 6 ft 1 in (1.85 m)
- Listed weight: 244 lb (111 kg)

Career information
- College: ITESM Monterrey
- NFL draft: 2004: undrafted

Career history

Playing
- Frankfurt Galaxy (2004)

Coaching
- Dinos de Saltillo (2017) Head coach; Mexicah (2019) Head coach; Galgos de Tijuana (2022) Head coach

Operations
- Liga de Fútbol Americano Profesional (2017–2018) Commissioner

Awards and highlights
- 2003 IFAF World Championship All-Star Team

Guillermo Ruiz Burguete
Medal record

Men's American football

Representing Mexico

World Championship
Silver medal – second place	1999 Palermo	Team
Silver medal – second place	2003 Germany	Team

José Guillermo Ruiz Burguete (born 24 January 1976) is a Mexican gridiron football coach. He previously played in the NFL Europe with the Frankfurt Galaxy.

== Playing career ==
=== College career ===
Ruiz Burguete played college football for the Centinelas CGP in 1995 and 1996 and later for the Borregos Salvajes Monterrey from 1998 to 2000, receiving a scholarship to study at the Monterrey Institute of Technology and Higher Education, where he majored in Business Administration.

During his college career, he won two National Championships in 1998 and 1999.

=== NFL Europe ===
In 2004, Ruiz Burguete was signed by the Frankfurt Galaxy of the NFL Europe.

=== National team ===
Ruiz Burguete was part of the Mexico national American football team that competed in the 1999 and 2003 IFAF World Championship, where he was included in the All-Star Team of the tournament.

== Coaching career ==
In November 2016, Ruiz Burguete was appointed head coach of the Dinos de Saltillo of the Liga de Fútbol Americano Profesional (LFA) ahead of the 2017 LFA season. Burguete led the Dinos to the Tazón México II, that they lost 18–24 to the Mayas CDMX.

In September 2017, he left the Dinos and was appointed as Commissioner of the LFA, but he resigned in January 2018.

In November 2021, Ruiz Burguete was appointed head coach of the Galgos de Tijuana. Burguete left the Galgos ahead of the 2023 LFA season and was replaced by Héctor del Águila.
