= Juan Robles (footballer) =

Mexican footballer (born 2003)

Personal information
- Full name: Juan Eduardo Robles Vargas
- Date of birth: 18 September 2003 (age 23)
- Place of birth: San José Iturbide, Guanajuato, Mexico
- Height: 1.65 m (5 ft 5 in)
- Position: Winger

Team information
- Current team: Querétaro
- Number: 23

Youth career
- 2018–2025: Querétaro
- 2020–2021: Tijuana
- 2021–2024: América

Senior career*
Years	Team	Apps	(Gls)
2024–	Querétaro	28	(2)

International career^{‡}
2019	Mexico U16	7	(0)
2019	Mexico U17	1	(0)
2020	Mexico U18	2	(0)
- * Club domestic league appearances and goals as of 1 November 2026 ‡ National team caps and goals as of 13 June 2026

Juan Eduardo Robles Vargas (born 18 September 2003) is a Mexican professional footballer who plays as a winger for Liga MX club Querétaro.

== Club career ==
Robles began his career at the academy of Querétaro where, after stints at Tijuana and América's academies, made his professional debut on 13 September 2024 against Puebla, being subbed in at the 63rd minute and scoring a goal a minute later in a 1–2 loss.

== Career statistics ==
=== Club ===
As of 1 November 2026

Club	Season	League			Cup		Continental		Intercontinental		Other		Total	
Club	Season	Division	Apps	Goals	Apps	Goals	Apps	Goals	Apps	Goals	Apps	Goals	Apps	Goals
Querétaro	2024–25	Liga MX	10	1	—		—		—		—		10	1
Querétaro	2025–26	Liga MX	17	1	—		—		—		2 (Note: Appearances in Leagues Cup)	0	19	1
Querétaro	2026–27	Liga MX	1	0	—		—		—		—		1	0
Career total			28	1	0	0	0	0	0	0	2	0	30	1
