= Querétaro F.C. =

Association football club in Mexico

Querétaro
- Full name: Querétaro Fútbol Club
- Nicknames: Gallos Blancos (White Roosters); Los Albiazules (The White and Blues)
- Short name: QRO, QFC
- Founded: July 8, 1950; 76 years ago (as Club Querétaro A.C.)
- Stadium: Estadio Corregidora
- Capacity: 35,575
- Owner: Innovatio Capital
- President: Marc Spiegel
- Manager: Esteban González
- League: Liga MX
- Clausura 2026: Regular phase: 11th of 18; Final phase: Not qualified
- Website: clubqueretaro.com
Home colours	Away colours	Third colours

Querétaro Fútbol Club, also known as Gallos Blancos de Querétaro, is a professional football club based in Querétaro. The club competes in Liga MX, the highest level of Mexican football, and plays its home matches at Estadio Corregidora. Founded in 1950 as Club Querétaro A.C., it was a founding club of the Segunda División. In 1999, Querétaro merged with the other franchise in the city known as Gallos Blancos UAQ and thus acquired its current nickname. The club's debut in top-level league was in the 1990–91 season.

In domestic competitions, Querétaro FC has won one Copa MX by defeating Guadalajara and one Supercopa MX by defeating América. The club has featured various professional football stars, including Ronaldinho and Antonio Valencia.

== History ==
=== Foundation ===
In 1949, the Federación Mexicana de Fútbol (FMF) proposed the idea of creating a "Segunda División" to expand interest in the game and to create a development program for the Primera División de México. Querétaro received an invitation to participate. Alfonso "Pachín" Niembro, then president of the Asociación Queretana de Fútbol, and Raúl Ayala, who represented Querétaro at the national level, with help from large numbers of locally based amateurs, decided to organize a tournament, the winner of which would represent the city of Querétaro in the new division. The tournament was won by a team named "Los Piratas", who became "Club Querétaro A.C." They joined Irapuato, Zacatepec, Toluca, Morelia and La Piedad as the founders of the Segunda División.

The team's official foundation is July 8, 1950. Later journalist Herrera "Periquín" Pozas bestowed the nickname of Gallos Blancos (White Roosters) based on the club's "willingness to fight for every ball" and their characteristic white uniforms. The team quickly developed a large local fanbase. Querétaro F.C. has come close to promotion on many occasions; one of the most memorable was in 1976 when they reached the Segunda División's Final and played against Atlante.

=== The Atletas Campesinos era ===
It was in the mid-70s when the foundation of Estudiantes de Querétaro took place. The team was composed mostly of students who wanted to gain a name in the Mexican league and became a good rival to Gallos Blancos, but in 1977, Armando Presa bought both teams and changed their name to Atletas Campesinos. This crop of young players with dreams of a future in professional football and very experienced players showed a notable improvement that year. But it was the next season when the team really soared, with a combination of experience and youth well stimulated economically; as the scores were better, the better they would be paid. Armando Presa decided that, although the team was heading in the right direction, it should be in the hands of a more experienced manager. The current manager, Antonio Ascencio, stepped down, and Antonio Carbajal took over the team.

It came the day back on June 22, 1980, when "Atletas Campesinos" would face Osos Grises at the Segunda División final game (Osos got a valuable tie at the Estadio Municipal, former ground of Querétaro's teams) which was the favorite team, but Campesinos gave a great surprise winning with a 2–1 score (goals made by Carlos Cerritos and Jorge Gaspar). Antonio Carbajal was carried off on the shoulders of the crowd, Antonio Ascencio and their boys wept of happiness. They could not believe it, finally they were the champions.

The Atletas Campesinos team got into the hearts of the people since they gave them a satisfaction that no team had done before: give to the city of Querétaro a Primera División team. The Atletas Campesinos were already at the maximum circuit with the idea of making a combination of a team with the best men already at the league and make a great campaign, but it didn't happen: the team started to lose their games and finally it was sold to the "Sindicato de Petroleros de Ciudad Madero". Then during the 1982–83 season, Querétaro lost the Atletas Campesinos team and it became the Tampico Madero team after being relocated to Tampico, Tamaulipas.

=== The UAQ Gallos Blancos era ===
In the early 1980s, it was given to the Autonomous University of Querétaro the team's rights of management and became the UAQ Gallos Blancos. This team became a "golden breed" of players like René Montalvo, Salvador "Zurdo" Ochoa and José de Jesús Torruco. In fact, the "UAQ Gallos Blancos" arrived to another Segunda División final in 1987, now against the Correcaminos UAT, but after playing the first game of the series at the Estadio Marte R. Gómez (with a 0–0 result), the team suffered an accident while returning from Ciudad Victoria, Tamaulipas to the city of Querétaro, where three very important players lost their lives. Even though the final match was moved a month, the team lost the series on a third match in the Estadio Azteca.

During the next days, the team became a youth/reserve squad of Cruz Azul, providing many players that later became Primera División football stars. Later, after many failures to get into the Primera División, the Autonomous University of Querétaro went into an economic crisis which caused it to sell the team to a north group of business men from Hermosillo, Sonora and in this way Querétaro lost again one of their teams.

=== The Cobras de Querétaro era ===
Later after the construction of the Estadio La Corregidora stadium in the middle 1980s, one of the most important Mexican TV broadcasters decided to manage a Segunda División team who received the name of "Cobras de Querétaro". This team obtained the Primera División category by the hand of Jorge "Coco" Gómez back in 1986, but they lasted only one season because at the end of the 86–87 season they went back to the Segunda División and the team was moved to Ciudad Juárez, Chihuahua.

=== The Club Querétaro era ===
In 1988, another team was created in the city, named "Club Querétaro". Quickly became a fierce rival to the "UAQ Gallos Blancos". These two teams were playing on the Second Division. After many unsuccessful seasons, footballer José Antonio García bought the Tampico Madero franchise and relocated it to the city of Querétaro, putting it into the Corregidora stadium under the name of "Club Querétaro". During this season the team had one of the most remarkable roster which included Rubén Omar Romano, Sergio Bueno, Miguel Herrera, Sergio Almaguer and many more, all of them under the direction of Ricardo La Volpe.

The team made a modest season and was sold to a group of business men from Querétaro (Vázquez Mellado family) who, despite all of their efforts, lost their category and in 1994 and finally went back into the Segunda División. Then in 1994, because of the problems of Antonio Peláez Pier with the administration of the Estadio Tamaulipas, the Tampico Madero team was moved to the city of Querétaro under the name of T.M. Gallos Blancos but that same season the team was relegated to the Segunda División under the hand of José Camacho and Juan de Dios Castillo.

Back in 1998, "Club Querétaro" and "UAQ Gallos Blancos" merged into one club and formed a team that played for three years with the original name of "Gallos Blancos de Querétaro" (White Roosters of Querétaro) until 2002.

=== Querétaro F.C. (2002–2012) ===
In 2002, a Primera División team, La Piedad, had to move from La Piedad, Michoacán to play in the city of Querétaro, where the team stayed for two years under the name "Querétaro F.C.". The team had a modest performance during four seasons; then in 2004 the Federación Mexicana de Fútbol (FMF) decided to reduce the number of teams in the Primera División from twenty to eighteen, and decided to eliminate two teams with the worst financial situation: Querétaro F.C. and Club Irapuato. That same year, Querétaro F.C. bought the franchise of a Primera División 'A' defunct team: Zacatepec.

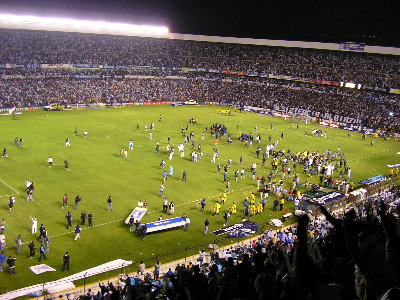
The club celebrating the 2008 promotion.

In 2005, Querétaro F.C. won the Primera A "Torneo de Clausura" and faced San Luis in the promotion play-off. Winning the first leg 2-1 at home, the game at San Luis Potosí ended in defeat after extra time, resulting in a 3–2 aggregate score. The suspicious way this game was conducted and the violence suffered by Querétaro's fans in hands of San Luis fans resulted in a fierce rivalry with this team.

On May 28, 2006, Querétaro F.C. was promoted to the Primera División, after beating Puebla in the Clausura 2006 tournament and the 2005/2006 Primera División 'A' promotion play-off by a 5–1 final score. But on April 29, 2007, the "Gallos Blancos" were relegated after failing to achieve 6 out of 9 points in the final 3 games in a fierce fight with Santos Laguna. A combination of their defeat in the final game against Atlas and a victory of Santos Laguna against Cruz Azul caused their relegation to the Primera División 'A'.

After a 2007–08 season to forget in the Primera División 'A' when the team couldn't make it to the play-offs, things changed in the Apertura 2008 tournament. Querétaro F.C. became the most dangerous offensive (including best striker: Mauro Néstor Gerk) and got the most points since their return to the Primera División 'A'. After beating Correcaminos UAT and Club Tijuana, Querétaro F.C. won their third Championship against Club Irapuato (which was the most effective defense of the tournament) by a 2–0 score. After their championship and a season filled with ups and downs, Querétaro F.C. played against Mérida F.C. (the current champion) the Promotion Play-off game which determines which team would play in the Primera División. After winning their first game against Mérida F.C. 2–1, the team played their second game at Mérida, Yucatán and lost but tied on aggregate. The teams went into extra time and eventually into penalty shots. Everyone scored and goalkeeper José Guadalupe Martínez stopped one of the Mérida F.C. shots. Winning the game on penalties the team acquired the right to play the next tournament in the Primera División.

=== Querétaro F.C. still in Primera División ===
At the end of the Clausura 2013 tournament, Querétaro F.C. ended up in the last position of the relegation table and therefore was to be relegated to the Liga de Ascenso for the upcoming Apertura 2013. However, the owner of Grupo Delfines bought the Jaguares de Chiapas franchise from TV Azteca and relocated the team to the city Querétaro to keep Querétaro F.C. in the Primera División. The relocation prompted Club San Luis to be relocated to Tuxtla Gutiérrez, Chiapas and become the new Jaguares de Chiapas, retaining top-flight football in that state. The current Querétaro F.C. franchise assumed the original franchise's television partnership with the Televisa family of networks (Querétaro F.C. was the last Liga MX team to have Televisa as its television partner before the privatization of TV Azteca.)

After owner Amado Yáñez was investigated for defrauding Banamex, the team was placed into government administration, from which Grupo Imagen, a media conglomerate, and Grupo Empresarial Ángeles, its parent company, bought the squad. Immediately, speculation swirled that Grupo Imagen was soon to pull Querétaro F.C. from Televisa, and with the launch of Imagen Televisión in October 2016, the Gallos Blancos had a new broadcast home.

In 2015, this team made it to the finals for the first time in the domestic league competition with the help of Danilinho, Emanuel Villa, and Ronaldinho, in the 2015 Clausura. The team faced Santos Laguna in the first leg losing 5–0, in the second leg Querétaro F.C. was able to pull off a 3–0 victory at home, but fell short by 2 goals helping them qualify to the CONCACAF Champions League for the first time.

On March 5, 2022, during a match between Querétaro and Atlas, a riot broke out between fans attending the match at Querétaro's stadium. Video posted on social media showed groups of men beating, kicking, dragging and stripping victims. According to the Querétaro state civil protection agency, at least 22 men were injured. League play for the following day was suspended, and the next Monday, five officials from the police and civil defence were suspended, the private company who were hired by the club would also have its contracts cancelled, and a ban on attending away games may be imposed on Querétaro fans.

On March 8, 2022, the Liga MX banned the team's fans from attending Querétaro's home matches for up to a year, as well as banning its barras (a group or club of fans) for up to three years, and also required Queretaro to be sold to another owner after its then-current owners, Manuel Velarde, Gabriel Solares, Alfonso Solloa, Javier Solloa, and Greg Taylor, were banned from conducting league-related activities for up to five years. It has since been transferred to Grupo Caliente, which also owns Club Tijuana, in which the group had to sell Querétaro by the end of the year, otherwise, the league would take ownership of the club. It was also fined MX$1.5 million (US$70,450) and its youth and women's teams must play all matches behind closed doors.

== Stadium ==
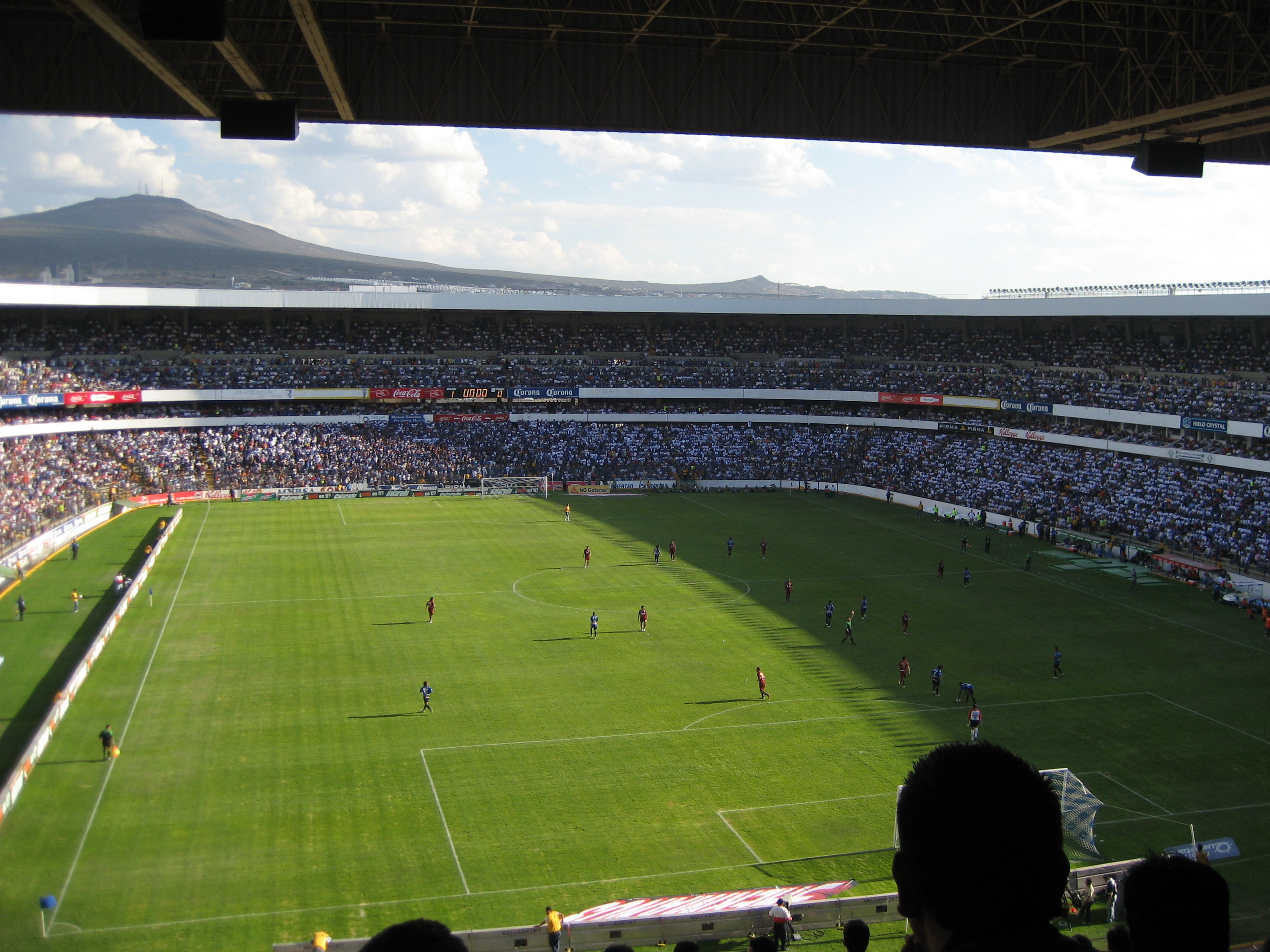
Corregidora Stadium

Initially the team played at the 10,000 seat Estadio Municipal de Querétaro. The team played there for about 35 years, and it remains in use by recreational and local squads, along with QFC's youth team with a reduced capacity.

Querétaro F.C. play their home games at Estadio Corregidora de Querétaro in Santiago de Querétaro, which opened in 1985 and was built in a Mexican-West German collaboration. Seating 35,575 and built for the 1986 FIFA World Cup (of which it hosted four matches for), it is designed to fill its capacity in fifteen minutes, then evacuate the same size crowd in seven minutes.

== Supporters and rivalries ==
Querétaro F.C. is considered a family-supported team, which includes several "porras" like "Esperanza Blanca", "Tradicional" and "La Corregidora". Recently, one of the fastest growing "barras" has been the Resistencia Albiazul, formerly known as "Rebeldía Queretana", whose chants or "porras" have become a consistent background of La Corregidora stadium.

Because of the short distance between the cities in the area known as el Bajío, there have always been rivalries with teams such as Irapuato and Celaya F.C., and Salamanca F.C. in the past. However, the fiercest rivalries are with León, Atlas F.C. and Atlético San Luis (formerly fulfilled with San Luis F.C.).

== Kits ==
- Home kit: Black and blue striped shirt with black shorts and socks.
- Away kit: White shirt with black shorts and white socks.

First kit history

1950	1969	1970	1974	1981	1982	1992	1994	2005	2016-17

Third kit history

65th Anniversary (Apertura 2015)

== Personnel ==
=== Management ===
Position	Staff
President	(United States) Marc Spiegel
Chief Business Officer	(Mexico) José Escamilla
Commercial Vice President	(Mexico) Jaime Caro del Castillo
Chief Sporting Officer	(Mexico) Álvaro de la Torre
Youth Academy Manager	(Mexico) Guillermo Hernández

=== Coaching staff ===
Position	Staff
Manager	(Chile) Esteban González
Assistant manager	(Chile) Miguel Pinto
Goalkeeper coach	(Mexico) Luis Valls
Fitness coach	(Chile) Mauricio Lamas
Team Doctors	(Mexico) Francisco Balbás (Mexico) Jorge González
Assistant Doctor	(Mexico) Rafael Zitlalpopoca

== Players ==
=== First-team squad ===
As of 9 September 2026

Note: Flags indicate national team as defined under FIFA eligibility rules; some limited exceptions apply. Players may hold more than one non-FIFA nationality.

No.	Pos.	Nation	Player
1	GK	MEX	José Hernández
2	DF	ARG	Lucas Abascia
4	MF	ESP	Carlo Adriano
5	MF	URU	Santiago Homenchenko
7	MF	ESP	Iker Benito
8	MF	MEX	Bernardo Parra
9	FW	MEX	Alí Ávila
11	FW	ARG	Mateo Coronel (on loan from Atlético Tucumán)
12	DF	BRA	Paulo Victor
13	DF	MEX	Diego Reyes
15	DF	MEX	Carlos Villanueva
16	MF	PAR	Enzo Giménez

No.	Pos.	Nation	Player
17	FW	MEX	Denilson Muñoz
18	MF	USA	Erik Dueñas
20	MF	MEX	Alex Alcalá
23	MF	MEX	Juan Robles
24	DF	COL	Bayron Duarte
25	GK	MEX	Guillermo Allison
26	FW	MEX	Eduardo Pérez
27	DF	MEX	Daniel Parra (on loan from Atlético Morelia)
28	MF	MEX	Jesús Arellano
29	MF	MEX	Waldo Madrid (on loan from Necaxa)
30	MF	MEX	Juan Carlos Martínez

=== Youth squad ===
Note: Flags indicate national team as defined under FIFA eligibility rules; some limited exceptions apply. Players may hold more than one non-FIFA nationality.

No. / Pos. / Nation / Player; 188 / DF / MEX / Darío Rodríguez	No. / Pos. / Nation / Player; 199 / DF / USA / Sergio Garcia Brothers

=== Out on loan ===
Note: Flags indicate national team as defined under FIFA eligibility rules; some limited exceptions apply. Players may hold more than one non-FIFA nationality.

No.	Pos.	Nation	Player
—	DF	MEX	Juan Daccarett (at Atlético La Paz)
—	DF	MEX	Sebastián Hernández (at Atlético Morelia)
—	DF	MEX	Francisco Venegas (at Pachuca)
—	MF	ECU	Michael Carcelén (at Aucas)

No.	Pos.	Nation	Player
—	MF	MEX	Juan Cázares (at UdeG)
—	MF	MEX	Martín Sol (at Sinaloa)
—	MF	SEN	Jean Unjanque (at Neuchâtel Xamax)
—	FW	ARG	Rodrigo Auzmendi (at San Lorenzo)

== Honours ==
Domestic
Type	Competition	Titles	Seasons	Runners-up
Top level FMF	Liga MX	0	—	Cla–2015
Top level FMF	Copa MX	1	Ape–2016	—
Top level FMF	Supercopa MX	1^{s}	2017	—
Lower levels FMF	Primera División A	3	Cla–2005, Cla–2006, Ape–2008	—
Lower levels FMF	Campeón de Ascenso	2^{s}	2006, 2009	2005
Lower levels FMF	Segunda División	0	—	1976–77
Lower levels FMF	Tercera División	0	—	1968–69, 1969–70
Lower levels FMF	Copa México Tercera División	1^{s}	1968–69	—
Lower levels FMF	Campeón de Campeones Tercera División	1^{s}	1969	—

Notes

- record
- ^{s} shared record
