= Querétaro–Atlas riot =

2022 football riot in Mexico

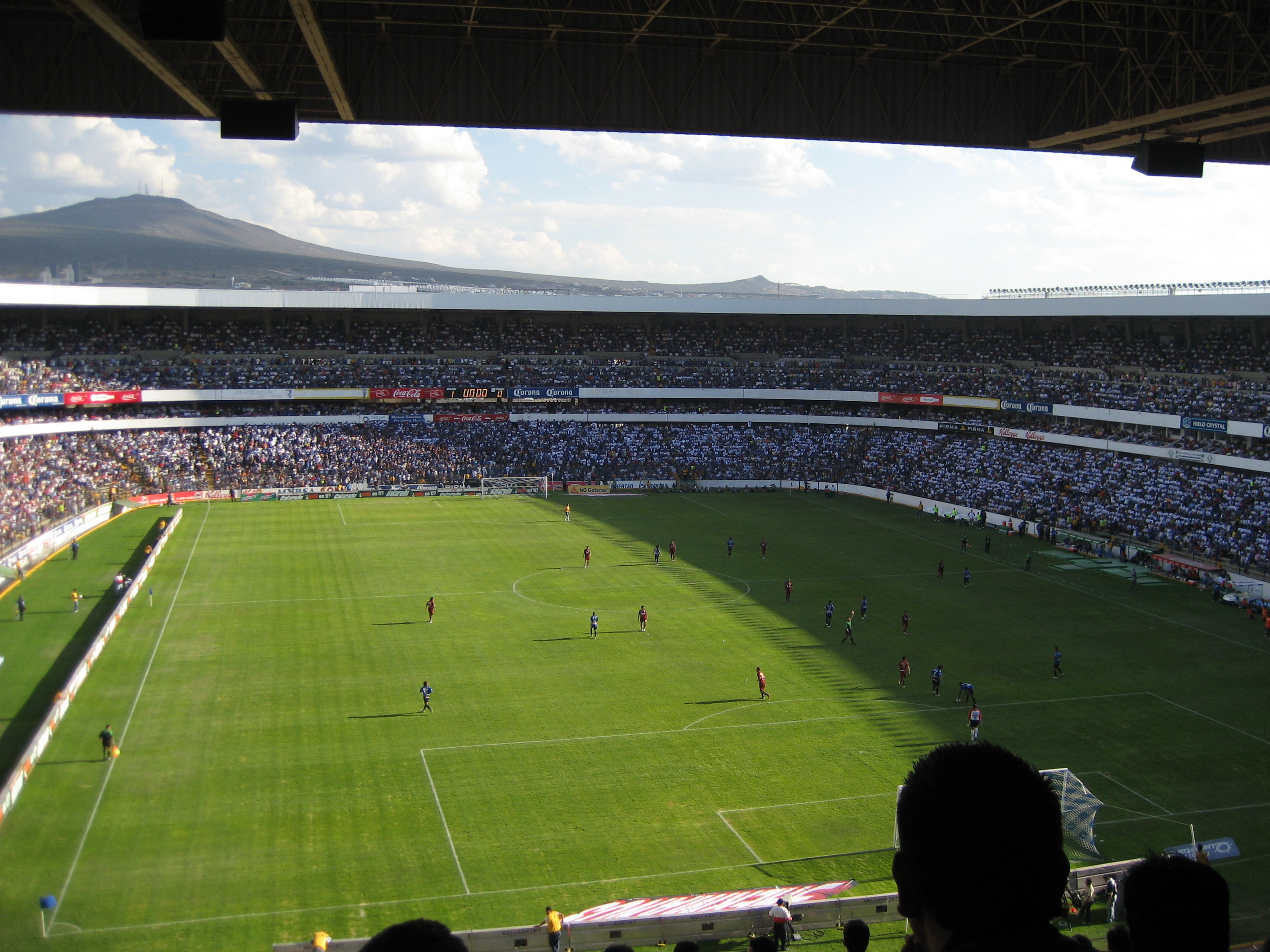
- Estadio Corregidora
- Date: 5 March 2022
- Location: Estadio Corregidora Querétaro City, Mexico
- Injuries: 26

On 5 March 2022, during a Liga MX football match between Querétaro F.C. and Atlas F.C., a riot broke out between fans attending the match at Estadio Corregidora in Mexico. Videos posted on social media showed groups of men beating, kicking, whipping, dragging and stripping victims.

At least 22 men were injured according to the Querétaro state's civil protection agency initial statement. This number was updated to 26 the following morning. Claims of death during the riot are disputed. While no deaths were officially confirmed, some deaths were reported by Atlas fans. David Medrano Félix, a journalist from TV Azteca, originally announced that there had been 17 deaths, but later retracted his report.

== Background ==
The conflicts between Querétaro F.C. and Atlas F.C. date back to 2007, when Atlas relegated Querétaro from the Primera División de México league at home (Estadio Jalisco) during the Clausura 2007 tournament. During that game, there were more Querétaro fans than Atlas fans. Three years later, when Querétaro were back in the Primera División league, and during the 2009–10 Mexican Primera División season, Atlas fans outnumbered Querétaro fans at home (Estadio Corregidora) and clashes were reported in the stands. Since then, conflicts between the barras (groups of conflictive fans) of both teams have existed and the matches between the teams have been seen as potentially problematic.

== Riots ==
Querétaro was playing a match against Atlas, the Liga MX Apertura 2021 champion, with kick-off time at 17:00 CST (UTC−6). Julio César Furch scored a goal for Atlas at the 28th minute, which stood for the remainder of the match. Confrontation between the supporters of both clubs began at the 57th minute; the match stopped at the 62nd minute mark as fans sprinted onto the pitch to avoid the fighting from the supporters in the bleachers. At the 102nd minute, the referees suspended the match.

== Aftermath ==
=== Reactions ===
Both Atlas and Querétaro released statements on social media condemning the riots and calling on the authorities to hold the instigators responsible.

The incident was reported through the media in Mexico. Querétaro state governor Mauricio Kuri González condemned the violence and gave instructions "to apply the law with all its consequences." The president of the Liga MX, Mikel Arriola, declared the violence "unacceptable" and that "exemplary punishments" will be made for those responsible for the riots. Arriola then went to Querétaro the following day to visit the injured fans.

Several countries expressed their solidarity with the victims. The day after the tragedy, on 6 March, in El Salvador the Primera División de El Salvador series' matches that were to take place that day hung the Mexican flag with black ribbons, and the teams of Alianza Fútbol Club and Club Deportivo Águila both from San Salvador and San Miguel respectively, who were going to play at the Cuscatlán Stadium in San Salvador were photographed together to promote non-violence among the fans.

On 7 March 2022, the governor had still not managed to arrest anyone despite having photo evidence of the perpetrators. Nor could he provide evidence that there had been no deaths. Statements by CONCACAF and FIFA were made the following day after the riot, condemning the violence with CONCACAF and FIFA calling on authorities to hold them accountable and that CONCACAF will provide any support to both the Mexican Football Federation and the Liga MX.

On 7 March 2022, Mexican President Andrés Manuel López Obrador announced during a conference that he would not hold the state governor responsible for the riot, although he did not condone the riots, The manager of Querétaro F.C., Hernán Cristante, said that his players also received death threats following the riots.

On 8 March 2022, C.D. Guadalajara announced via their website and social media that the club will ban barras from both Guadalajara and Club América in their upcoming derby match on 12 March.

On 9 March 2022, Arriola stated that the riots could have affected Mexico's role in co-hosting the 2026 FIFA World Cup, saying that its role would have been in jeopardy had there not been a response to the violence.

=== Consequences ===
The Liga MX announced that all matches held on Sunday, the following day, would be postponed and are rescheduled at the request of the players union, Asociación Mexicana de Futbolistas. The league's disciplinary committee as well as that of the Mexican Football Federation started an investigation into the riots. Its female counterpart, the Liga MX Femenil, also announced that matches held on 6 March would be postponed and rescheduled.

The league confirmed that the match between Querétaro and Atlas would be rescheduled at a later date where teams would play the time remaining on the match as required under the league's competition regulations. In addition, the Liga de Expansión MX, the second-level league of the Mexican football league system, also announced that all matches scheduled between 8 and 13 March 2022 would be played behind closed doors. At least five officials, which included police and civil defense employees as well as three people involved for planning and preparation, were suspended after the riots.

On 8 March 2022, the Liga MX banned fans from attending Querétaro's home matches for up to a year, requiring all home matches to be played behind closed doors, banned the Querétaro barras for up to three years, and also banned the club's owners, Manuel Velarde, Gabriel Solares, Alfonso Solloa, Javier Solloa, and Greg Taylor, from conducting league-related activities for up to five years. It also required the club to be transferred to a new owner, where it will be transferred to its original owners, Grupo Caliente, which also owns Club Tijuana and must sell the team by the end of the year. If Grupo Caliente fails to sell the club then the league will take ownership of the club. It also ruled the match a win for Atlas, with the score recorded 0–3 after Atlas scored 0–1 before it was abandoned. It also fined the current owners $1.5 million pesos and ordered the club's youth and women's teams to play behind closed doors, and also banned Atlas-affiliated barras from attending home matches for up to six months.

The league also announced that new security and safety measures would be implemented for the teams by the 2022–23 season, including facial recognition and fan IDs where they must register and identify members of a team's supporters groups, while minors will now be banned from being in supporter groups sections. The league also banned private security in stadiums and requiried state, local, and municipal police to prove security for all matches. The Liga MX will also not disaffiliate Querétaro from the league to avoid any interference with the rest of the 2022 Clausura season.

=== Arrests of involved ===
On 8 March, 14 male suspects were arrested in connection to the violence. Two were released shortly thereafter due to lack of evidence.

== See also ==
- Football hooliganism
- Sports riot
