= Johannes Zirngibl =

German professional football player (born 1999)

No. 15 – Munich Ravens
- Position: Defensive end

Personal information
- Born: February 3, 1999 (age 27); Landau an der Isar, Germany
- Listed height: 6 ft 7 in (2.01 m)
- Listed weight: 253 lb (115 kg)

Career information
- College: New Mexico Military

Career history
- Plattling Black Hawks (2017); Ingolstadt Dukes (2018); Straubing Spiders (2019–2022); Munich Ravens (2023–present)

Awards and highlights
- GFL 2 South Champion (2021); GFL All-Star Team (2022)

Johannes Zirngibl (born February 3, 1999) is a German professional football defensive end for the Munich Ravens of the European Football Alliance.

== Professional career ==
=== Plattling Black Hawks and Ingolstadt Dukes ===
Zirngibl, who played association football in his youth, began playing American football with the Plattling Black Hawks in 2017. He joined the Ingolstadt Dukes for the first half of the 2018 GFL season. In nine games, he recorded 17 tackles and three sacks, leading the team in sacks.

=== Straubing Spiders ===
In summer 2018, Zirngibl went to Roswell, New Mexico, to attend the New Mexico Military Institute. He then returned from the United States after a few months and joined the Straubing Spiders. Before making his debut with the Spiders, he participated in the CFL Global Combine in Toronto in March 2019. In Straubing, he led the team in sacks in all three years and was also the team's leading tackler in 2021. With the Spiders, he won the GFL 2 South in 2021 and was subsequently promoted to the GFL. In January 2022, Zirngibl was called up to the extended roster of the Germany national team. After the conclusion of the 2022 GFL regular season, Zirngibl was selected to the All-Star Team.

=== Munich Ravens ===
For the 2023 season, Zirngibl signed a contract with the Munich Ravens of the European League of Football (ELF).

== Personal life ==
Zirngibl is a trained metalworker.
