= Universidad del Valle de México =

Private university in Mexico

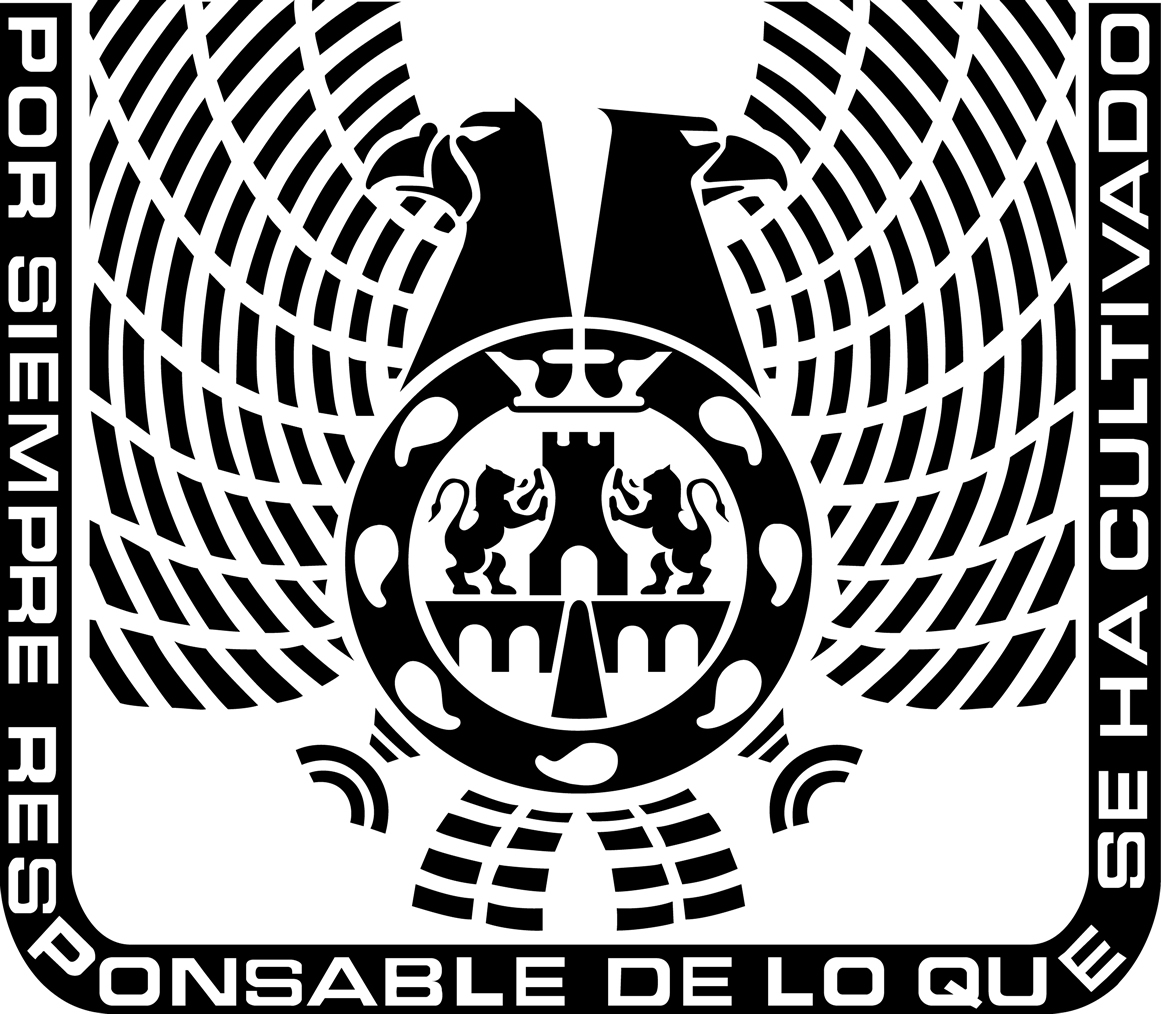
- Motto: "Por siempre responsable de lo que se ha cultivado"
- Motto in English: "Forever responsible for what has been cultivated"
- Type: Private
- Established: November 16, 1960
- Founder: José Ortega Romero
- Parent institution: Laureate International Universities
- Rector: Mónica Porres Hernández
- Students: c. 130,000
- Location: 38 campuses throughout Mexico; 19.2968°N 99.1448°W
- Mascot: Lynx
- Website: uvm.mx
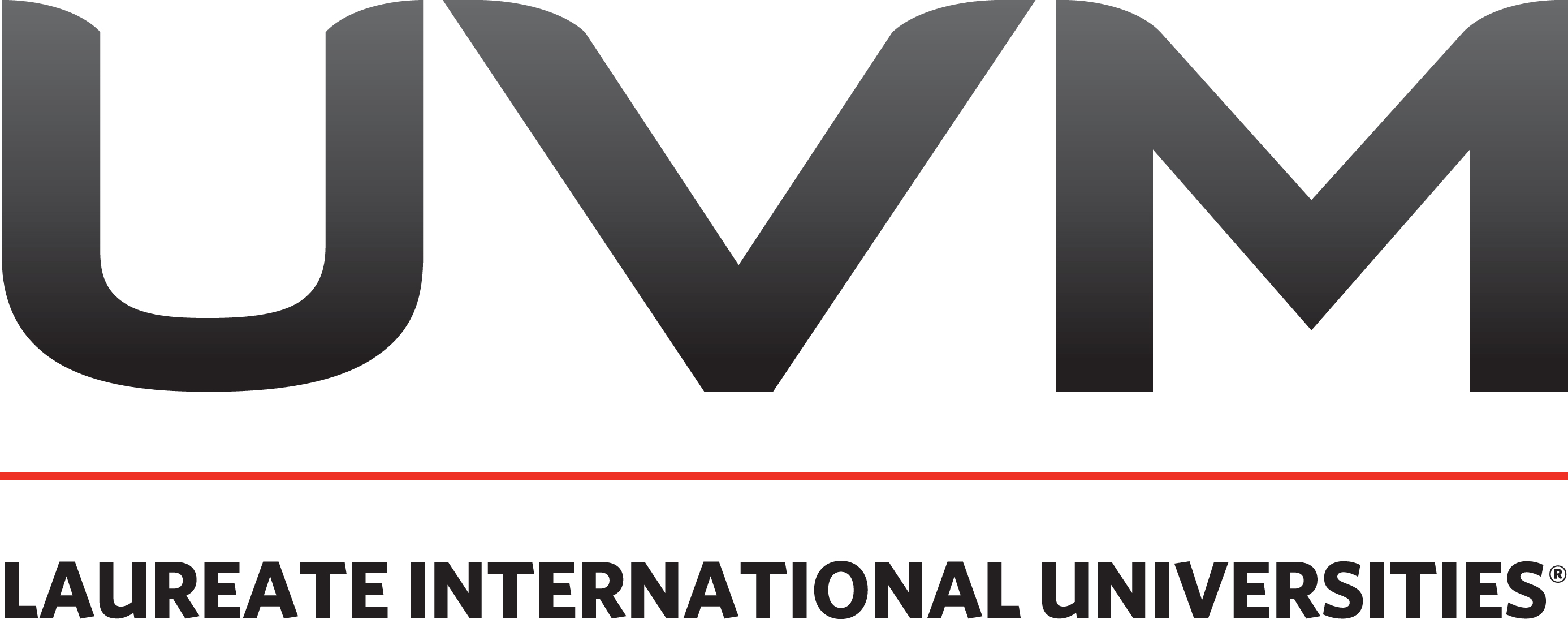

The Universidad del Valle de México (UVM) is a private university founded in 1960 and one of the largest university systems in Mexico.

The school enrolls more than 120,000 students, and has approximately 11,900 faculty members and 6,900 staff employees. UVM has more than 200,000 alumni and offers undergraduate and graduate degree programs on 38 campuses throughout Mexico. The undergraduate programs offered include Medicine, Law, Engineering, Business, Communication, and Architecture degrees as well as master's degrees in business, law, engineering, and psychology. UVM has developed online and working adult career programs.

== History ==
A group of academics and businessmen led by José Ortega Romero founded Universidad del Valle de México (UVM). It opened on November 16, 1960, with 212 students, 23 teachers and 14 administrative staff, offering elementary, secondary, high school and undergraduate programs in accounting and business administration. It soon quit its education in the first two levels to concentrate on the remaining.

In 1968, the institution was consolidated.

UVM's relationship with Laureate International Universities allowed the school to offer academic international exchanges, multiple country titles, and opportunities to exchange knowledge and experiences among the 80 institutions in the Laureate network.

== Campuses ==
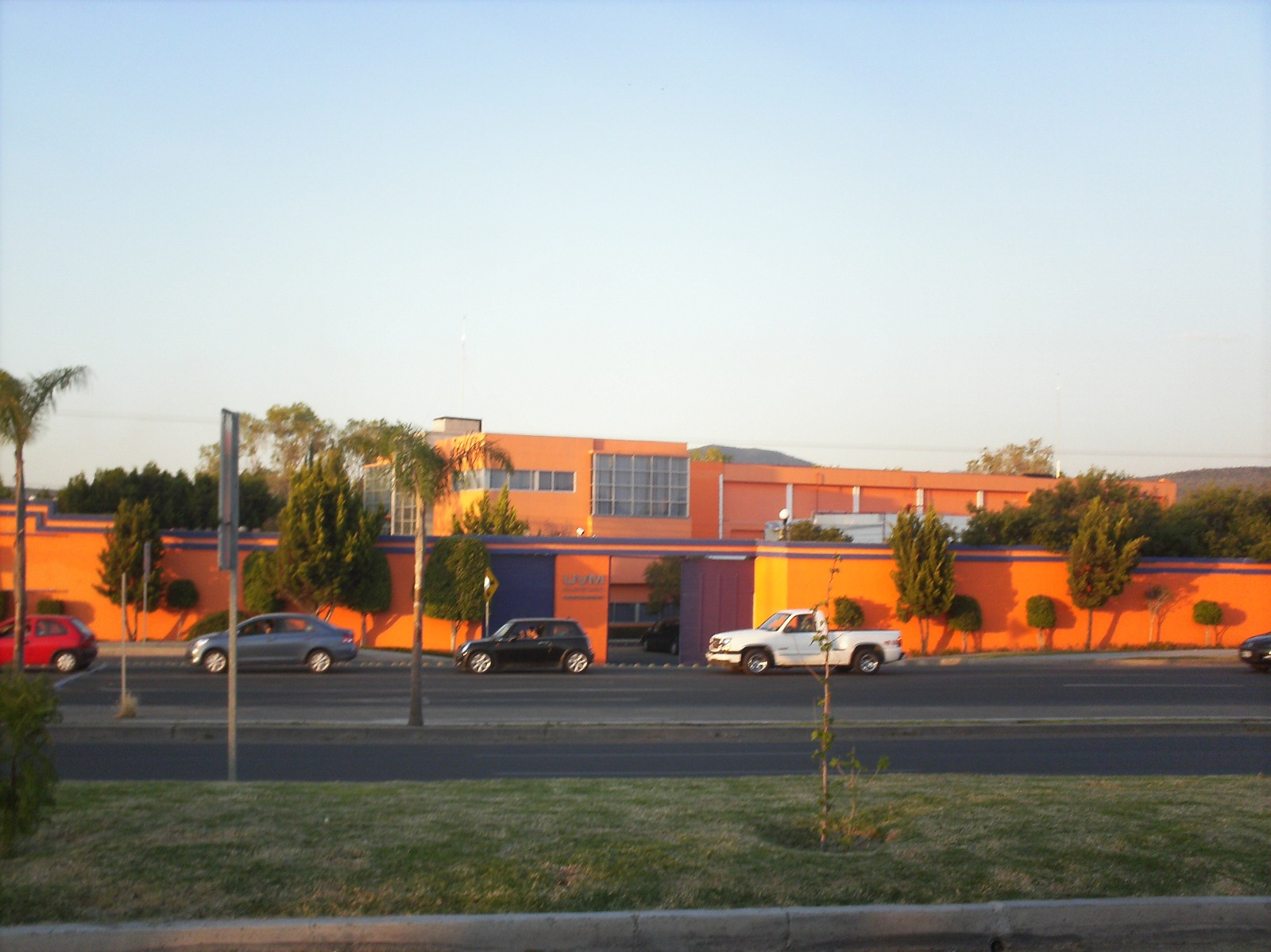
UVM in Santiago de Querétaro

UVM has 34 campuses located in 18 Mexican states, making it the largest private university in Mexico.

Since 1976, the university started to expand by opening new campuses located in Mexico City and the surrounding areas, including San Rafael, Coyoacán, Tlalpan, Lomas Verdes, Hispano, Toluca, and Texcoco.

More UVM campuses were established in: Aguascalientes (2001), Puebla (2002), Toluca (2003), Guadalajara Sur, Saltillo e Hispano (2004), Hermosillo y Torreon (2005), Nogales, Mexicali y Cuernavaca (2006), Monterrey Norte, Guadalajara Norte, Ciudad Victoria, Matamoros, Nuevo Laredo, Tampico y Reynosa (2007), Mérida, Zapopan y Monterrey Cumbres y Coyoacan (2008) y Chihuahua y Veracruz (2011). The Nuevo Laredo campus was closed in 2015 due to gang threats.

== Awards and memberships ==
- Reconocimiento Global de Validez de Estudios. Acuerdo No.131, Secretario de Educación Publica, February 8, 1988.
- Reconocimiento de Excelencia Academica de Programas de Estudio de Nivel Licenciatura, granted by Secretaria de Educación Publica (SEP), 2006.
- Reconocimiento del Padron de Planes y Programas de Estudio de Excelencia Academica en el Medio Superior granted by Secretaria de Educación Publica (SEP).
- Certificación de Calidad Académica Lisa y Llana, given by Federación de Instituciones Mexicanas Particulares de Educación Superior (FIMPES 1995, 2002, 2010 and 2011).
- According to Guía Universitaria 2020, UVM is ranked seventh in the top 10 universities in Mexico.
- QS Stars, an international standard assessing higher education institutions globally. QS Stars gives UVM 5 stars in the fields of education, employability and access.
- Member of the Asociacion Nacional de Universidades e Instituciones de Nivel Superior (ANUIES since 1996)
- Member of the Asociacion de Facultades y Escuelas de Medicina, A.C. (AMFEM)
- Member of Federacion Mexicana de Facultades y Escuelas de Odontología (FEMFEO)
- Registro Nacional de Instituciones y Empresas Cientificas y Tecnologicas (RENIECYT)
- Convenio de Colaboración Académica con el Sistema Nacional de Investigadores (SNI)

== Comprehensive education ==
UVM students receive a comprehensive education that combines academic preparation, technology, ethical values, sports and cultural activities. They also learn English and are prepared to be assessed for different certifications in the fields of IT.

== Internationality ==
Students have the opportunity of acquiring an international experience to be more competitive, because they have access to the links and possibilities offered by other institutions within the Laureate network. The geographic dispersity of Laureate gives them access to more than 105 international programs at 80 universities worldwide.

- Some 14,000 students are studying any of the international programs offered by such institutions as Kendall, UEM, IEDE Business School, Naba, Walden and Santa Fe University of Art and Design.
- During the last year, some 2,700 students from UVM traveled abroad to study a program within the network.
- UVM offers its students 575 exchange opportunities, including summer campus, certificates and double degrees.
- 145 options of Double Degrees and International Certificates, both in Mexico and abroad.
- More than 15 intensive schools (summer or winter) with foreign teachers visiting the country.
- 5 English levels in alliance with prestigious institutions.

== Sports ==
Universidad del Valle de Mexico student-athletes have achieved triumphs in important national and international competitions.

- 14 UVM athletes participated in the 2012 London Olympics (out of 100 participants in the Mexican delegation)
- UVM students received 3 out of the 4 medals earned by Mexico in the 2012 London Olympics.
- 16 UVM athletes attended the 2015 Pan American Games in Toronto. They won 14 medals: 4 golds, 5 silvers, and 5 bronzes.

=== Football (American Football) ===
The UVM football team "Linces UVM" (UVM Lynxes) competes in the ONEFA.

== Academic model results ==
- UVM is one of the top five Mexican universities according to the ranking of Selecciones del Reader's Digest
- UVM earned 5 stars (the highest possible grade) in QS Stars ranking in the fields: teaching, employability and access.
- UVM's alumni earn 7% more than their peers from other private and public universities.
- Unirank rates UVM the 41st rated college in Mexico and 4048th globally.
- According to UVM, their alumni spend less time than their peers looking for a job when they finish their studies and they obtain more benefits (research with no official value).

== Notable alumni ==
=== Computing systems ===
- Carlos Cortés, (Computing Systems), Oscar Winner for Best Sound: Sound of Metal.

=== Politics ===
- Jorge Emilio González Martínez, (Business Administration) Mexican politician, Senator in the LXII Legislature of the Mexican Congress and leader of the Ecologist Green Party of Mexico (PVEM)
- Cesar Duarte Jaquez, (Law) Governor of the State of Chihuahua.
- Everardo Padilla Camacho, (Law) Mexican politician, former National Youth Action Secretary of the National Actiona Party (PAN).
- Mauricio Kuri González (Law), Mexican politician and entrepreneur
- Rodrigo Reina Liceaga, (Business Administration) Mexican politician, former deputy of the LXI Legislature of the Mexican Congress.
- José Antonio Aguilar Bodegas, (Industrial Relations) Mexican politician, former Senator in the LIX Legislature.
- Ricardo Anaya Cortés, (Master in Tax Law), Mexican politician, former Presidential Candidate and visiting professor of politics at the School of International and Public Affairs, Columbia University.
- Julio César Reyes Hernández, (Master in Tax Law), Mexican politician, former Ambassador in Greece.

=== Health Sciences ===
- Andrew Almazán, (Psychology), Derek Bok Public Service Award recipient, Harvard University.

=== Sports ===
- María Espinoza, Olympic medalist (Gold) 2008 Beijing
- Alejandro Garcia Navarro, Olympic medalist
- German Saul Sanchez Sanchez, swimmer both Olympic medalists;
- Vanessa Zambotti, Mexican judoist, second place in 2015 Pan American Games at Toronto;
- Victor Estrada, Taekwondo practitioner and Olympic medalist

=== Arts ===
- Guillermo Jester, winner at ELLE Mexico Diseña 2014.

=== Doctor Honoris Causa ===
- Antonio Villaraigosa, American politician, 41st mayor of the City of Los Angeles
- Alondra de la Parra, Mexican conductor and music director of the Queensland Symphony Orchestra
- José Ángel Gurría, Mexican economist and diplomat
- Mario Molina, Mexican chemist, first Mexican-born scientist to receive a Nobel Prize in Chemistry
