= Estadio de Béisbol Francisco I. Madero =

Baseball stadium in Saltillo, Mexico

Estadio Francisco I. Madero
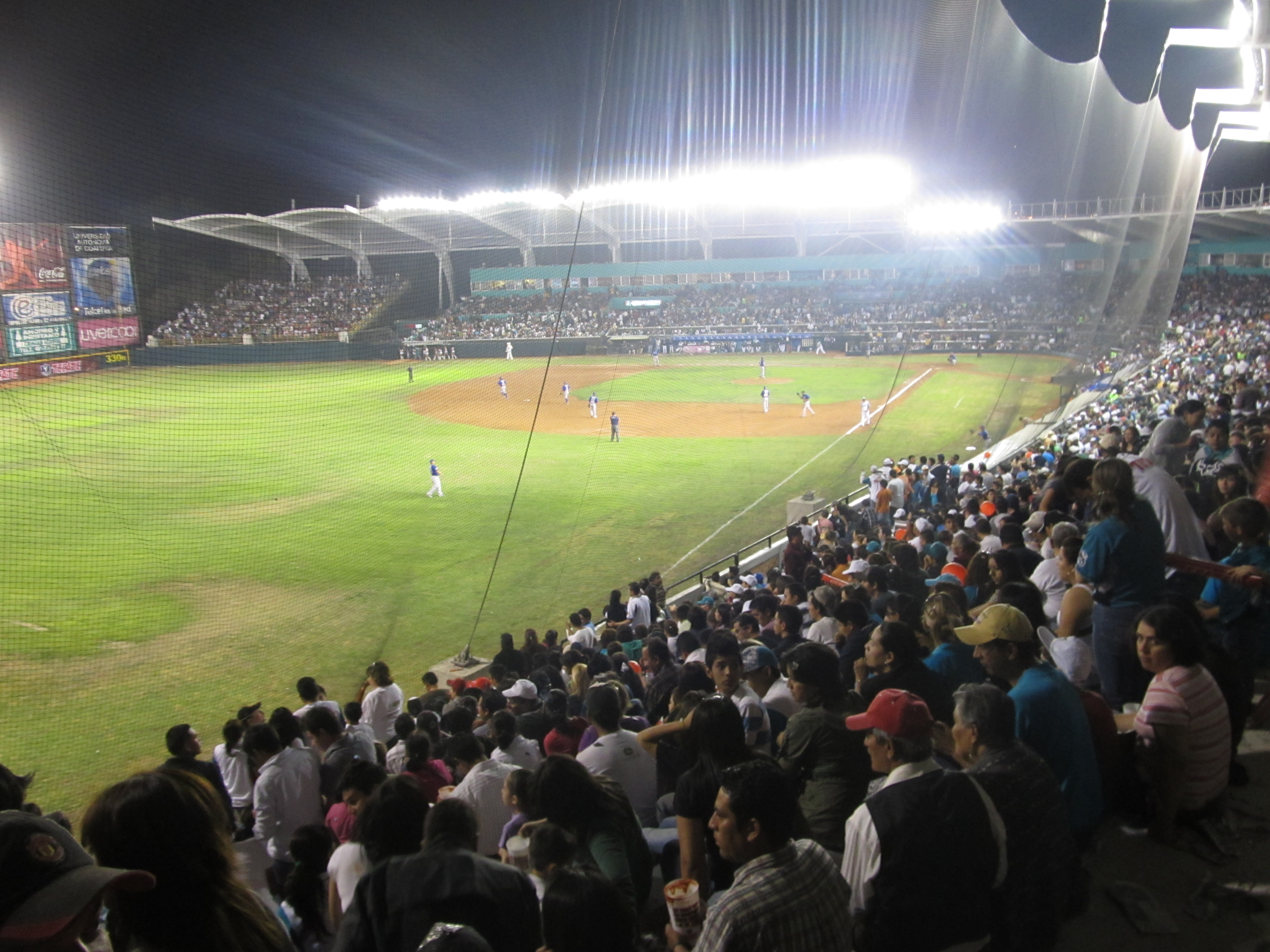
- First game after renovations, 28 March 2011
- Interactive map of Estadio Francisco I. Madero
- Location: Doctor Jesús Valdez Sánchez; Zona Sin Asignación de Nombre de Colonia; Saltillo, Coahuila, Mexico
- Coordinates: 25°26′1.15″N 100°58′43.70″W
- Capacity: 11,000
- Scoreboard: 14 metres (46 ft) $\times$ 22 metres (72 ft)

Construction
- Opened: 1963
- Renovated: 1999; 2011

Tenants
- Saraperos de Saltillo (1970–present); Dinos de Saltillo (LFA) (2022–2025); Saltillo F.C. (LPM) (2023–2024)

Estadio Francisco I. Madero is a stadium in Saltillo, Mexico. It is primarily used for baseball and is the home field of the Saraperos de Saltillo. It holds 11,000 people, and features a video screen measuring 14 meters high by 22 meters wide (46 feet high by 72 feet wide). The stadium is named after Coahuila native Francisco I. Madero who served as President of Mexico from 1911 to 1913.

The stadium was renovated in 1999, and again in 2011. The reopening ceremony on 28 March 2011 followed the most recent renovations and was attended by Saraperos President Alvaro Law, former Saltillo Mayor Jericó Abramo Masso, and President of the Liga Mexicana de Béisbol Plinio Escalante Bolio.

In 2022, Dinos de Saltillo of the Liga de Fútbol Americano Profesional, moved to the stadium due to an agreement between the club and the Saraperos.

In 2023, Saltillo F.C. of the Liga Premier de México moved to stadium temporarily due to reconstruction works on the Estadio Olímpico de Saltillo.

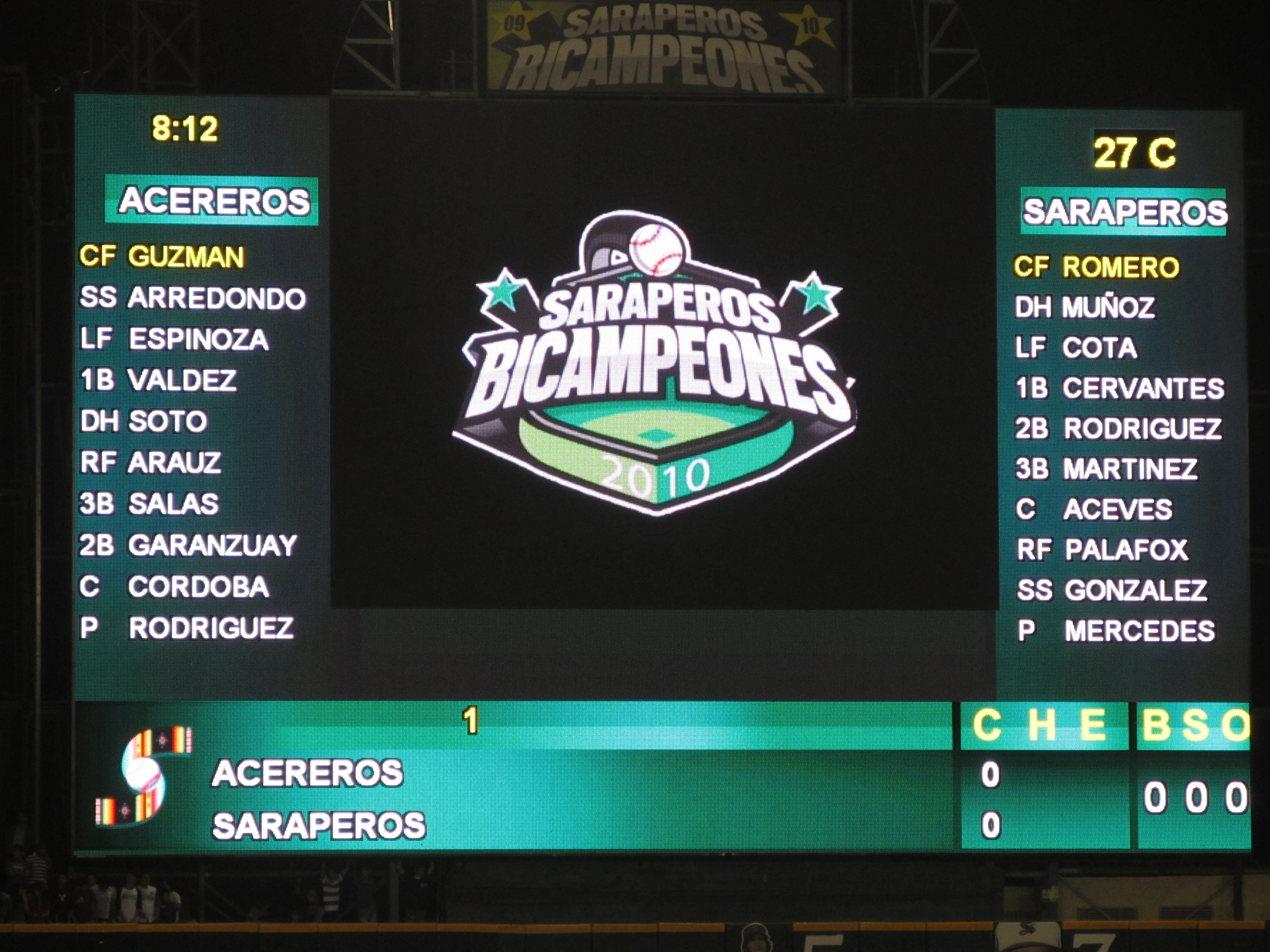
Scoreboard in 28 March 2011

The video scoreboard has been upgraded to a large high resolution display measuring 14 by 22 meters
