= Estadio Caliente =

Stadium in Tijuana, Mexico

- La Perrera "The Kennel"; La Perrera Más Grande de México "The Largest Kennel in Mexico"

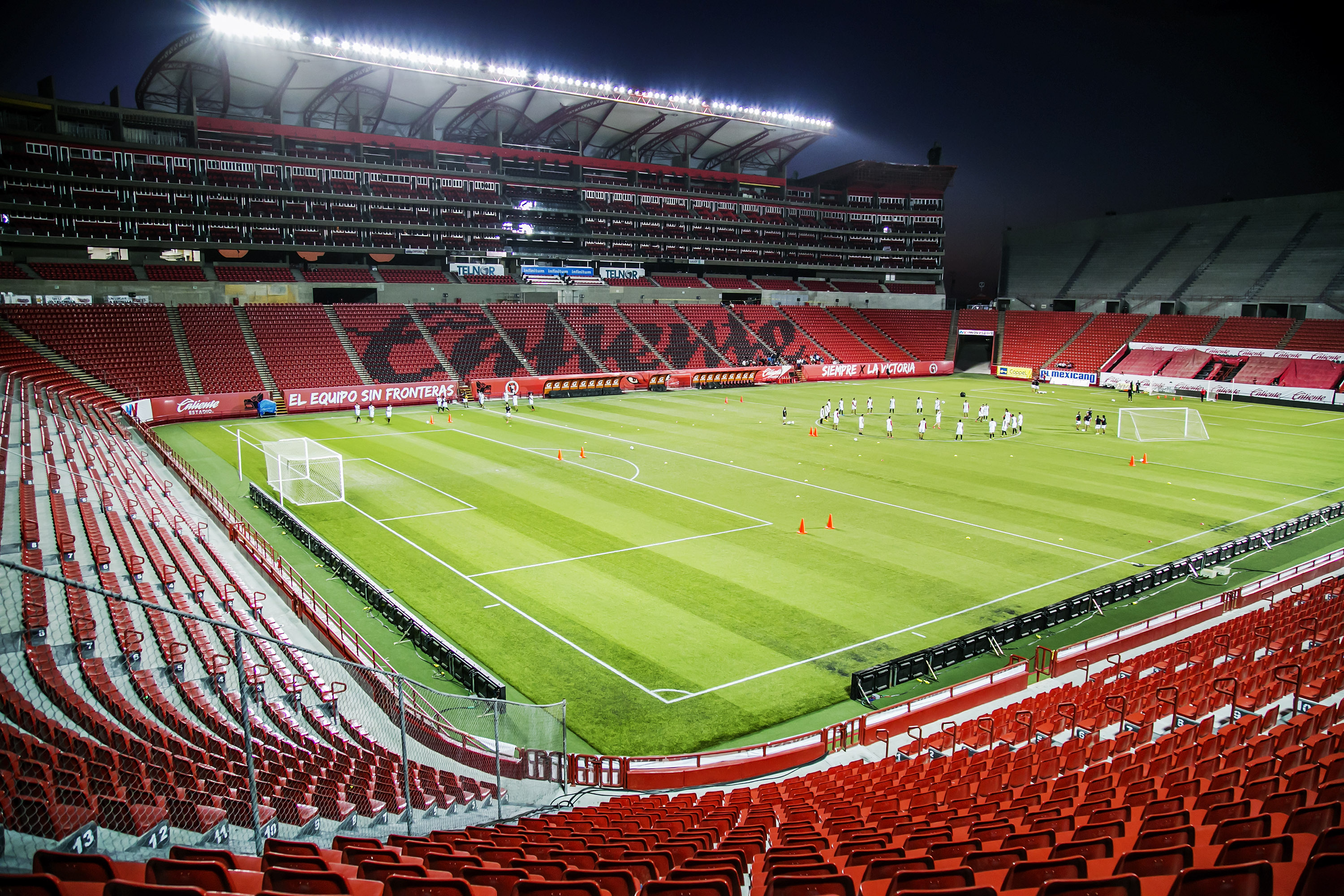
- Interactive map of Estadio Caliente
- Location: Tijuana, Baja California, Mexico
- Coordinates: 32°30′22″N 116°59′35″W
- Owner: Grupo Caliente
- Capacity: 27,333 (expanding to 33,333)
- Surface: Artificial turf (Note: Due to hot springs under stadium floor that impede grass growth.)
- Field size: 103 × 68 meters

Construction
- Groundbreaking: August 2006
- Opened: 11 November 2007
- Cost: USD 30 million
- Architect: Héctor Troncoso-Parraga

Tenants
- Tijuana (Liga MX) (2007–present); Galgos de Tijuana (LFA) (2022–2024); Dorados de Sinaloa (LEMX) (2024–2026)

Estadio Caliente is a multi-purpose stadium in Tijuana, Baja California, Mexico, located across the Tijuana River from the Mexico–United States border. It is the home of Club Tijuana of Liga MX. The stadium was also home of Galgos de Tijuana of the Liga de Fútbol Americano Profesional (LFA).

== Stadium ==
The stadium was opened in November 2007, according to schedule. The stadium originally had a capacity of 13,333. Work on the stadium still continues today. The stadium will have a final capacity of 33,333 once completed. Stadium owner Jorge Hank Rhon's main reason for constructing the stadium was his wish to have a professional football club in the city.

Because the Mexican Federation of Association Football says that teams participating in the First Division must have a stadium with a capacity over 15,000, Club Tijuana officially became qualified for promotion to the Primera División de México when the capacity was increased.

The construction of the stadium was planned in two parts. The first part finished the ground and lower sections of the stadium. In the second phase, the stadium's capacity was increased. As of 2022, the stadium is still under construction.

The design of the project was led by the architect Héctor Troncoso-Parraga.

== Other uses ==
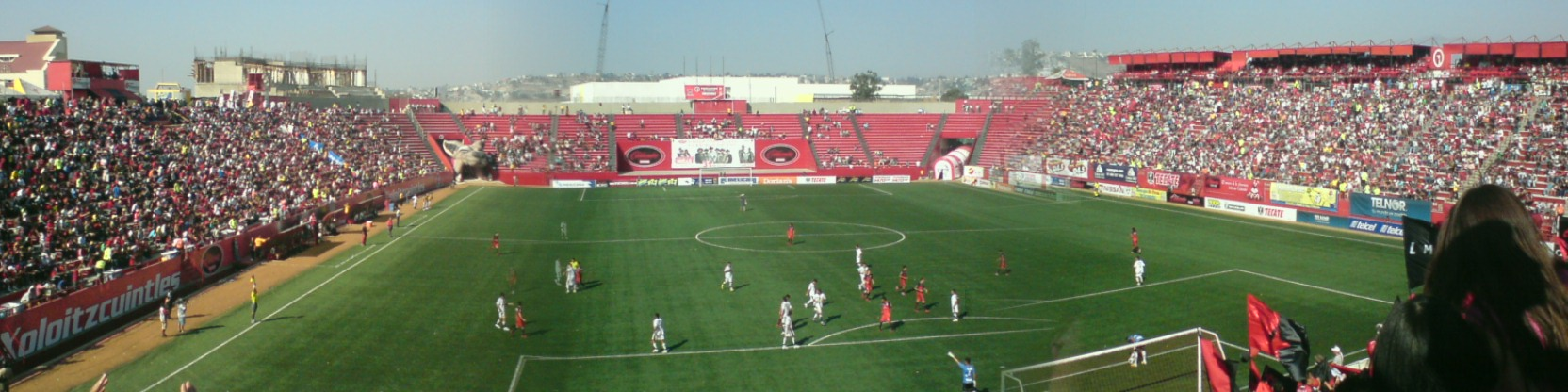
A panoramic photograph of the stadium in December 2009

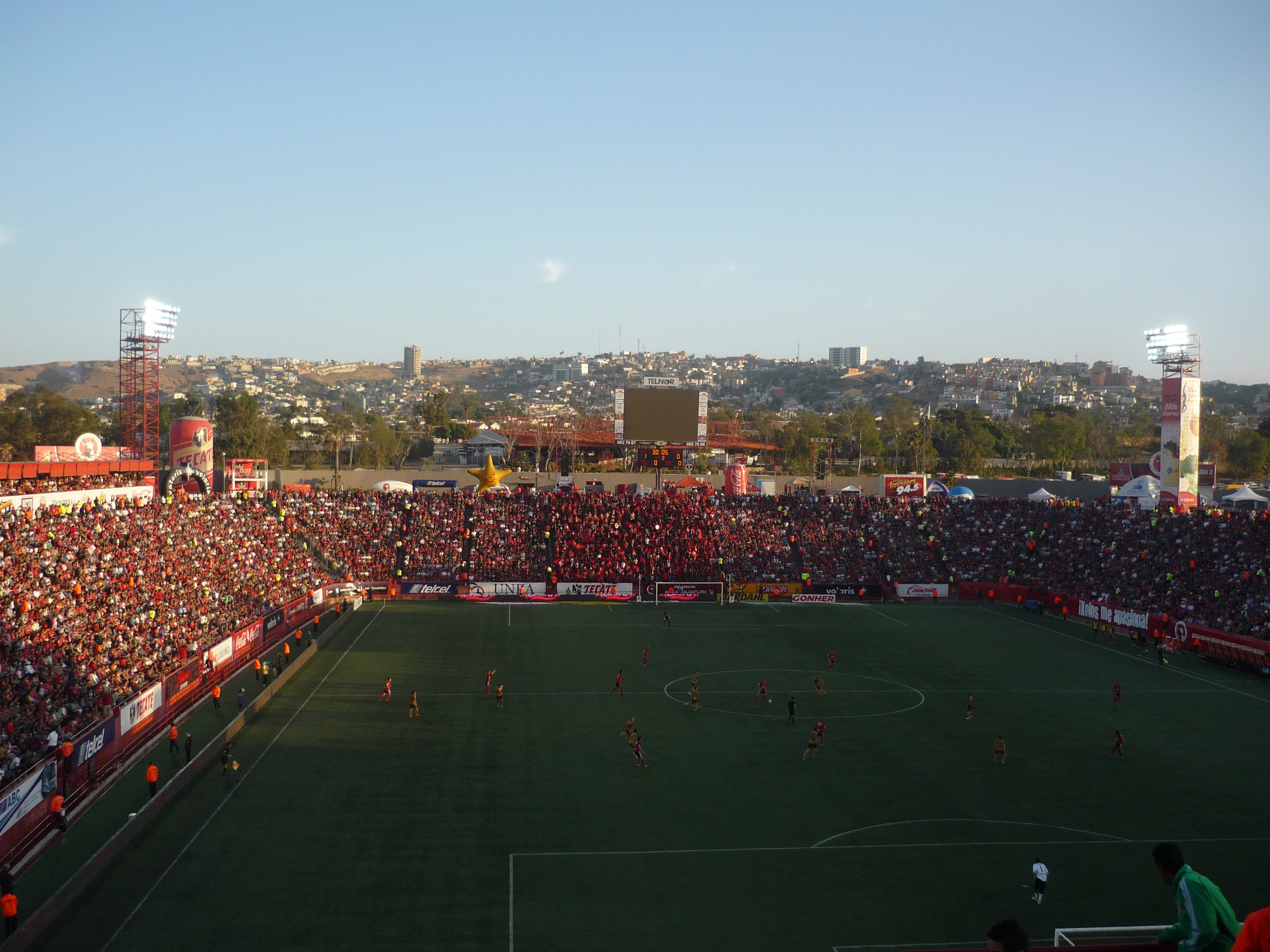
Internal view of the stadium from 2012

=== International football games ===
In 2009, the stadium hosted the eight-team CONCACAF Men's Under-17 Championship.

Home	Result	Visitor
Mexico U-20	0–0	Paraguay U-20

=== Boxing ===
Opponent 1	Winner	Opponent 2	Date
Erik Morales	Erik Morales	Francisco Lorenzo	18 December 2010
Erik Morales	TBD	Julio Cesar Chavez	20 May 2022

=== Concerts ===
Artists such as Shakira, Daddy Yankee, Karol G, Nicky Jam, Maná, Luis Miguel, Gloria Trevi, Megadeth, Guns N' Roses, Los Bukis and Alejandro Sanz have performed at the stadium. Rauw Alejandro was to perform at the stadium on 10 June 2023.
