= Gallos Negros de Querétaro =

Mexican American football team

Logo

General information
- Founded: 7 December 2021; 4 years ago
- Stadium: Estadio Olímpico de Querétaro
- Headquartered: Querétaro City, Mexico
- Colours: Black, blue and grey

Personnel
- Owner: Marcelo Juaristi
- Head coach: Marco Martos

League / conference affiliations
- Liga de Fútbol Americano Profesional (2022-present)

Gallos Negros de Querétaro (English: Queretaro Black Roosters) are an American football team based in Querétaro City, Mexico. The Gallos Negros compete in the LFA, the top American football league in Mexico. The team was established following the relocation of Condors, one of the charter teams of the league, to Querétaro in November 2021.

== History ==
On 10 November 2021 Commissioner Alejandro Jaimes revealed the Condors would relocate prior to the 2022 LFA season. The team had been acquired by the ownership group of Querétaro football club from Condors' owner Luis Nassar. On 7 December 2021, the move to Querétaro City was made official by LFA authorities and the team was presented as Condors de Querétaro.

On 3 February 2022, the team revealed a new identity and were rebranded as Gallos Negros de Querétaro. Following the rebrand, the league considers Gallos Negros as a new franchise that will begin competing in the 2022 season.

Gallos Negros' roster for the 2022 season was composed in its majority by players who were part of Condors prior to the team's move to Querétaro. In their first year, they made the playoffs as the #6 seed despite having a losing record. Querétaro had made it in their first year to the championship game after winning two playoff games on the road.

In December 2022, Rubén Contreras was appointed as head coach of the team ahead of the 2023 LFA season, replacing Félix Buendía.

== Season-by-season ==
Season	Head coach	Regular season				Postseason			
Season	Head coach	Won	Lost	Win %	Finish	Won	Lost	Win %	Result
2022	Félix Buendía	1	5	.167	6th (League)	2	1	.667	Won Wild Card at (Mexicas) 14–7; Won Semifinal at (Dinos) 27–20; Lost Tazón México V vs. (Fundidores) 14–18
2023	Rubén Contreras	1	9	.100	9th (League)	–	–	–	–
2024	Carlos Strevel	3	5	.375	7th (League)	–	–	–	–
2025	Carlos Strevel	2	6	.250	7th (League)	–	–	–	–
Total		7	25	.219		2	1	.667	
