= Economy of Mexico =

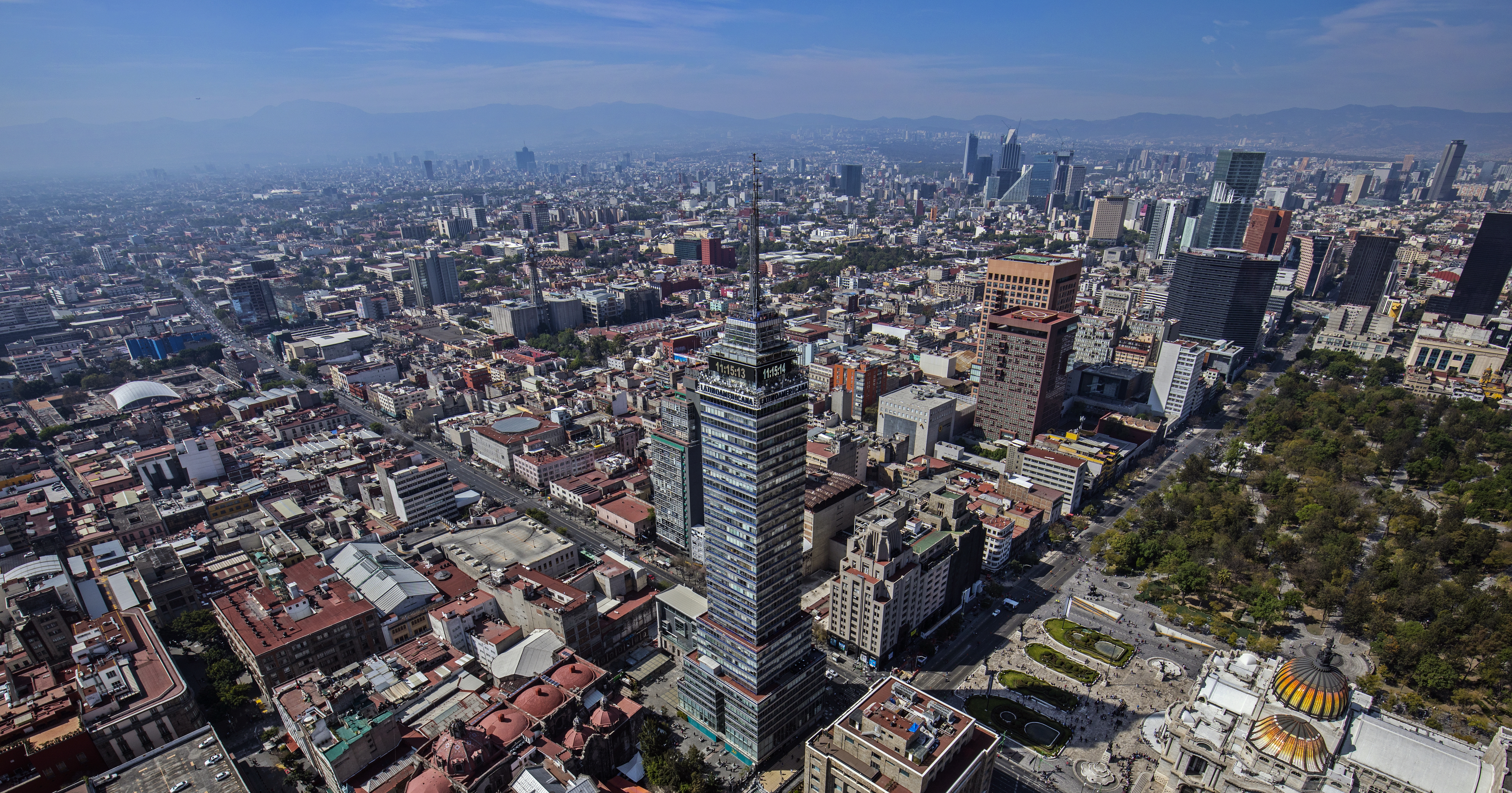
- Mexico City is the economic centre of Mexico as its capital and largest city.
- Currency: Mexican peso (MXN, Mex$)
- Fiscal year: Calendar year
- Trade organizations: G20, APEC, CPTPP, USMCA, OECD and WTO
- Country group: Developing/Emerging; Upper-middle income economy; Newly industrialized country

Statistics
- Population: ▲132,997,658 (2026 est.)
- GDP: ▲$2.18 trillion (nominal; 2026); ▲$3.59 trillion (PPP; 2026)
- GDP rank: 13th (nominal; 2026); 13th (PPP; 2026)
- GDP growth: ▲1.5% (2026f); ▲1.8% (2027f); ▲2.2% (2028f)
- GDP per capita: ▲$16,191 (nominal; 2026); ▲$26,743 (PPP; 2026)
- GDP per capita rank: 68th (nominal, 2026); 79th (PPP, 2026)
- GDP per capita growth: ▼ -0.3% (2025)
- GDP by sector: agriculture: 3.6%; industry: 31.9%; services: 64.5%; (2017 est.)
- Inflation (CPI): ▼3.8% (2025 annual average)
- Population below national poverty line: ▼29.6% in poverty (2024); ▼5.3% in extreme poverty (2024); ▼21% on less than $8.30/day (2024)
- Gini coefficient: ▼39.1 medium (2024)
- Human Development Index: ▲0.789 high (2023) (81st); ▲0.646 medium IHDI (73rd) (2023)
- Corruption Perceptions Index: ▼27 out of 100 points (2025, 141st rank)
- Labor force: ▲61,113,357 (2026); ▲58.7% employment rate (2026)
- Labor force by occupation: agriculture: 13.4%; industry: 24.1%; services: 61.9%; (2011)
- Unemployment: 2.7% (Q2 2026)
- Informal employment: 56.9% (2025)
- Average gross salary: Mex$16,662 / $848.31 monthly (2024)
- Average net salary: Mex$14,623 / $744.48 monthly (2024)
- Main industries: Food processing; beer; soft drinks; auto parts; automobiles; electronics; chemicals; iron; steel; petroleum; mining; textiles; clothing; motor vehicles; consumer durables; tourism

External
- Exports: ▲$680.79 billion (2024)
- Export goods: Machinery 25%; Vehicles 23%; Electronics, electrical equipment 17%; Medical equipment 4.9%; Oils and fossil fuels 3.1%; Other 27%; (2025 data)
- Main export partners: United States 82.7%; Canada 2.9%; China 1.9%; Germany 1.5%; Brazil 0.8%; Others 10.2%
- Imports: ▲$697.06 billion (2024)
- Import goods: metalworking machines, steel mill products, agricultural machinery, electrical equipment, automobile parts for assembly and repair, aircraft, aircraft parts, plastics, natural gas, and oil products
- Main import partners: United States 43.9%; China 19.6%; South Korea 3.7%; Germany 3%; Japan 3%; Others 26.8%
- FDI stock: ▲$554.3 billion (December 31, 2017, est.); ▲ Abroad: $243.8 billion (December 31, 2017, est.)
- Current account: ▲ −$19.35 billion (2017 est.)
- Gross external debt: ▼$445.8 billion (December 31, 2017, est.)

Public finance
- Government debt: ▲61.7% of GDP (2025)
- Foreign reserves: ▲$212.408 billion (January 2024)
- Budget balance: −1.1% (of GDP) (2017 est.)
- Revenue: 261.4 billion (2017 est.)
- Spending: 273.8 billion (2017 est.)
- Economic aid: $189.4 million (2008)
- Credit rating: Standard & Poor's: A (Domestic); BBB (Foreign); A+ (T&C Assessment); Outlook: Negative; Moody's: Baa3; Outlook: stable; Fitch: BBB-; Outlook: Stable
- All values, unless otherwise stated, are in US dollars.

Mexico has a developing, free-market mixed economy. It is the 13th-largest economy in the world by both nominal GDP and PPP as of 2026. It is known for its strong international trade networks, particularity with the United States and Canada who freely trade through USMCA. Mexico has a pronounced tourism industry, generating around 8% of Mexican GDP. It has a significant industrial manufacturing base as the 10th largest exporting and importing economy.

The Mexican economy has broad macroeconomic stability, moderate inflation, and a strengthening labor market. It is challenged by a large informal economy, deep wealth inequality, and public corruption. Significant gaps persist between the urban and the rural population, the northern and southern states, and the rich and the poor. Mexico is a highly unequal country: 0.2% of the population owns 60% of the country's wealth, while 38.5 million people live in poverty (2024). The OECD and WTO both rank Mexican workers as the hardest-working in the world in terms of the number of hours worked yearly.

== History ==
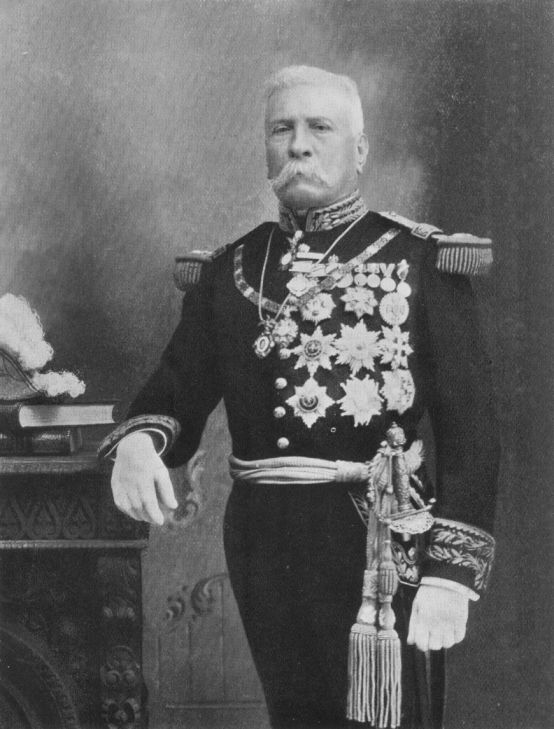
Porfirio Díaz, (1876–1911) in whose presidency rapid industrialization took place in foreign capital.

The Porfiriato brought substantial economic growth during the last quarter of the nineteenth century. This growth was accompanied by foreign investment, the development of railroad networks, and the exploitation of the country's natural resources. Annual economic growth between 1876 and 1910 averaged 3.3%. Large-scale ownership made considerable progress while foreign land companies accumulated millions of hectares. At the end of Porfirio Díaz's dictatorship, 97% of arable land belonged to 1% of the population and 95% of peasants were landless, becoming farmworkers in huge haciendas or forming an impoverished urban proletariat whose revolts were crushed one by one.

Political repression and fraud, as well as huge income inequalities exacerbated by the land distribution system based on latifundios, in which large haciendas were owned by a few but worked by millions of impoverished peasants living in precarious conditions, led to the Mexican Revolution (1910–1920), an armed conflict that drastically transformed Mexico's political, social, cultural, and economic structure during the twentieth century. The war left a harsh toll on the economy and population, which decreased over the 11 years between 1910 and 1921. The reconstruction of the country was to take place in the following decades.

The period from 1940 to 1970 has been dubbed by economic historians the Mexican Miracle, a period of economic growth that followed the end of the Mexican Revolution and the resumption of peacetime capital accumulation. During this period, Mexico adopted an import substitution industrialization (ISI) model, which protected and promoted the development of national industries. Mexico experienced an economic boom through which industries rapidly expanded their production. Important changes in the economic structure included free land distribution to peasants under the concept of ejido, the nationalization of the oil and railroad companies, the introduction of social rights into the 1917 Constitution, the birth of large and influential labor unions, and the upgrading of infrastructure. While the population doubled from 1940 to 1970, GDP increased sixfold during the same period.

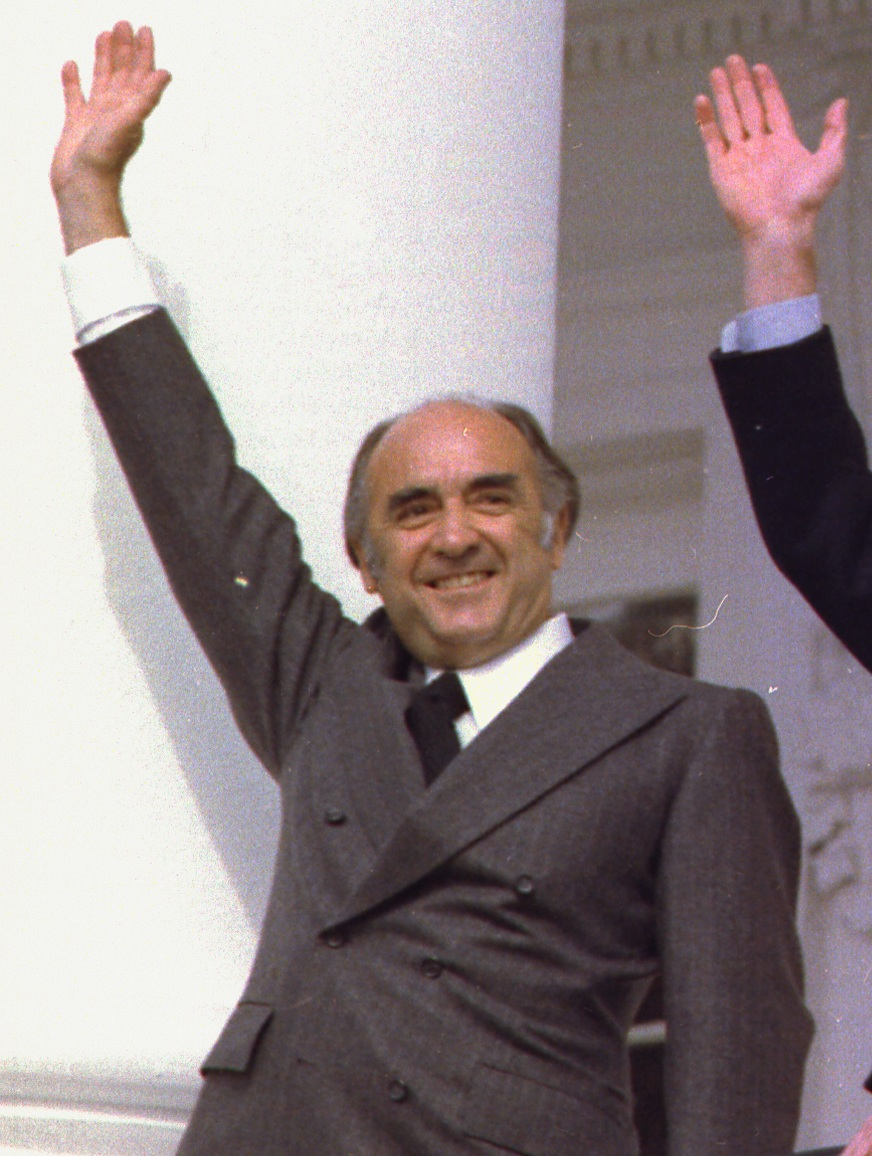
President José López Portillo 1976–1982, during whose administration the economy soared with the discovery of oil and then crashed when the price dropped.

Growth, while under the ISI model, had reached its peak in the late 1960s. During the 1970s, the presidential administrations of Luis Echeverría (1970–76) and José López Portillo (1976–82) tried to include social development in their policies, an effort that entailed increased public spending. With the discovery of vast oil fields during a period of oil price increases and low international interest rates, the government borrowed from international capital markets to invest in the state-owned oil company Pemex, which in turn seemed to provide a long-run income source to promote social welfare. This produced a remarkable growth in public expenditure, and president López Portillo announced that the time had come to "manage prosperity" as Mexico multiplied its oil production to become the world's fourth-largest exporter.

Average annual GDP growth by period
| 1900–1929 | 3.4% |
| 1929–1945 | 4.2% |
| 1945–1972 | 6.5% |
| 1972–1981 | 5.5% |
| 1981–1995 | 1.5% |
| 1983 Debt Crisis | -4.2% |
| 1995 Peso Crisis | -6.2% |
| 1995–2000 | 5.1% |
| 2001 US Recession | -0.2% |
| 2009 Great Recession | -6.5% |

From 1981 to 1982, the international panorama changed abruptly: oil prices plunged and interest rates rose. In 1982, López Portillo, just before ending his administration, suspended payments on foreign debt, devalued the peso, and nationalized the banking system, along with many other industries severely affected by the crisis, among them the steel industry. While import substitution had contributed to Mexican industrialization, by the 1980s, the protracted protection of Mexican companies had led to an uncompetitive industrial sector with low productivity gains.

President Miguel de la Madrid (1982–88) was the first of a series of presidents who implemented neoliberal policies. After the crisis of 1982, lenders were unwilling to return to Mexico, and to keep the current account in balance, the government resorted to currency devaluations, which sparked unprecedented inflation, reaching an annual record of 139.7% in 1987.

One of the first steps toward trade liberalization was Mexico's signature of the General Agreement on Tariffs and Trade (GATT) in 1986 under President de la Madrid. During the administration of Carlos Salinas de Gortari (1988–94), many state-owned companies were privatized. The telephone company Telmex, a government monopoly, became a private monopoly, sold to Carlos Slim. Also not opened to private investors were the government oil company Pemex or the energy sector. Furthermore, the banking system that had been nationalized in the waning hours of the López Portillo administration in 1982 was privatized, but foreign banks were excluded. Salinas pushed for Mexico's inclusion in the North American Free Trade Agreement, expanding it from a U.S.-Canada agreement. The expanded NAFTA was signed in 1992, following the signing of two additional supplements on environmental and labor standards. It came into effect on January 1, 1994.

Salinas also introduced strict price controls and negotiated smaller minimum wage increments with the labor union movement under the aging Fidel Velázquez to curb inflation. While his strategy successfully reduced inflation, growth averaged only 2.8 percent a year. By fixing the exchange rate, the peso became rapidly overvalued while consumer spending increased, causing the current account deficit to reach 7% of GDP in 1994. The deficit was financed through tesobonos, a public debt instrument that reassured payment in dollars.

The January 1994 Chiapas uprising, and the assassinations of the ruling party's presidential candidate in March 1994, Luis Donaldo Colosio and the Secretary-General of the party and brother of the Assistant-Attorney General José Francisco Ruiz Massieu in 1994, reduced investor confidence. Public debt holders rapidly sold their tesobonos, depleting the Central Bank's reserves, while portfolio investments, which had made up 90% of total investment flows, left the country as fast as they had come in.

This unsustainable situation eventually forced the entrant Zedillo administration to adopt a floating exchange rate. The peso sharply devalued, and the country entered an economic crisis in December 1994. The boom in exports, as well as an international rescue package crafted by U.S. president Bill Clinton (1993-2001), helped cushion the crisis. The economy was growing again within less than 18 months, and the annual growth rate averaged 5.1 percent between 1995 and 2000. More critical interpretations argue that the crisis and subsequent public bailout "preserved, renewed, and intensified the structurally unequal social relations of power and class characteristic of finance-led neoliberal capitalism" in forms institutionally specific to Mexican society, with GDP growth spurred by one-time privatizations. Per capita economic growth in the 2000s was low.

President Ernesto Zedillo (1994–2000), and President Vicente Fox (2000–06), of the National Action Party (Mexico), the first opposition party candidate to win a presidential election since the founding of the precursor of the Institutional Revolutionary Party in 1929, continued with trade liberalization. During Fox's administrations, several FTAs were signed with Latin American and European countries, as well as with Japan and Israel, and both strove to maintain macroeconomic stability. Thus, Mexico became one of the most open countries in the world to trade, and the economic base shifted accordingly. Total trade with the United States and Canada tripled, and total exports and imports almost quadrupled between 1991 and 2003. The nature of foreign investment also changed with a greater share of foreign direct investment (FDI) over portfolio investment. The wealth of Mexico's leading billionaires stems from the privatizations of the 1990s, when the country sold off its state-owned companies at low prices: telecoms (Telmex) to Carlos Slim, trains (Ferromex) to German Larrea, and television (TV Azteca) to Ricardo Salinas.

== Macroeconomic, financial, and welfare indicators ==
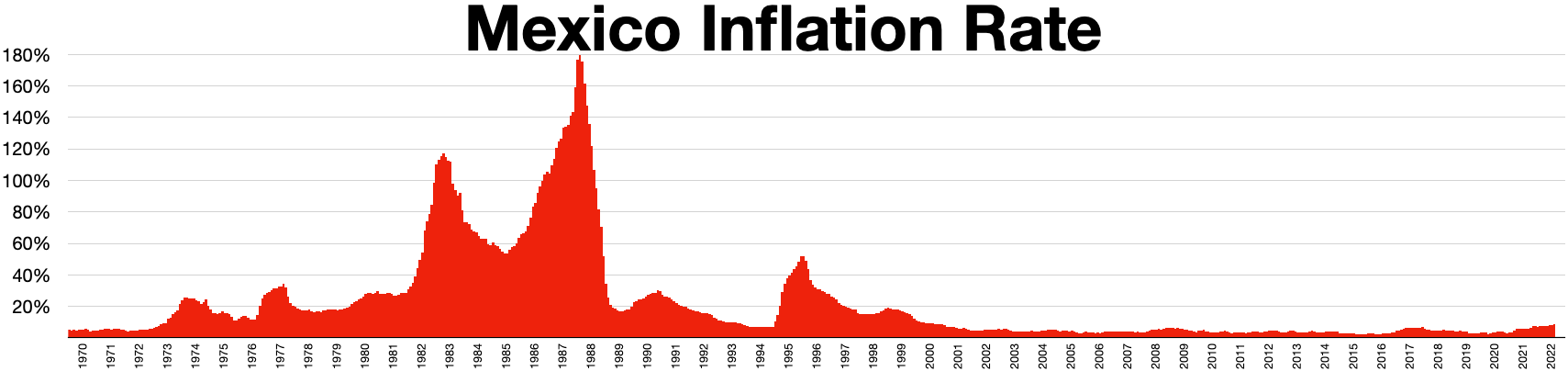
Mexico inflation rate 1970-2022

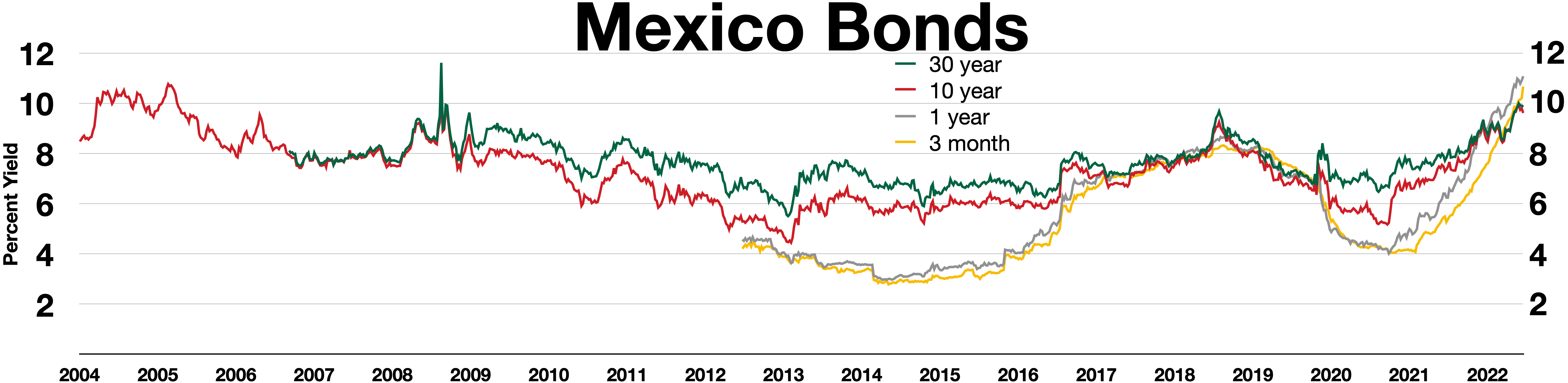
Mexico bonds 30 year 10 year 1 year 3 month

=== Main indicators ===
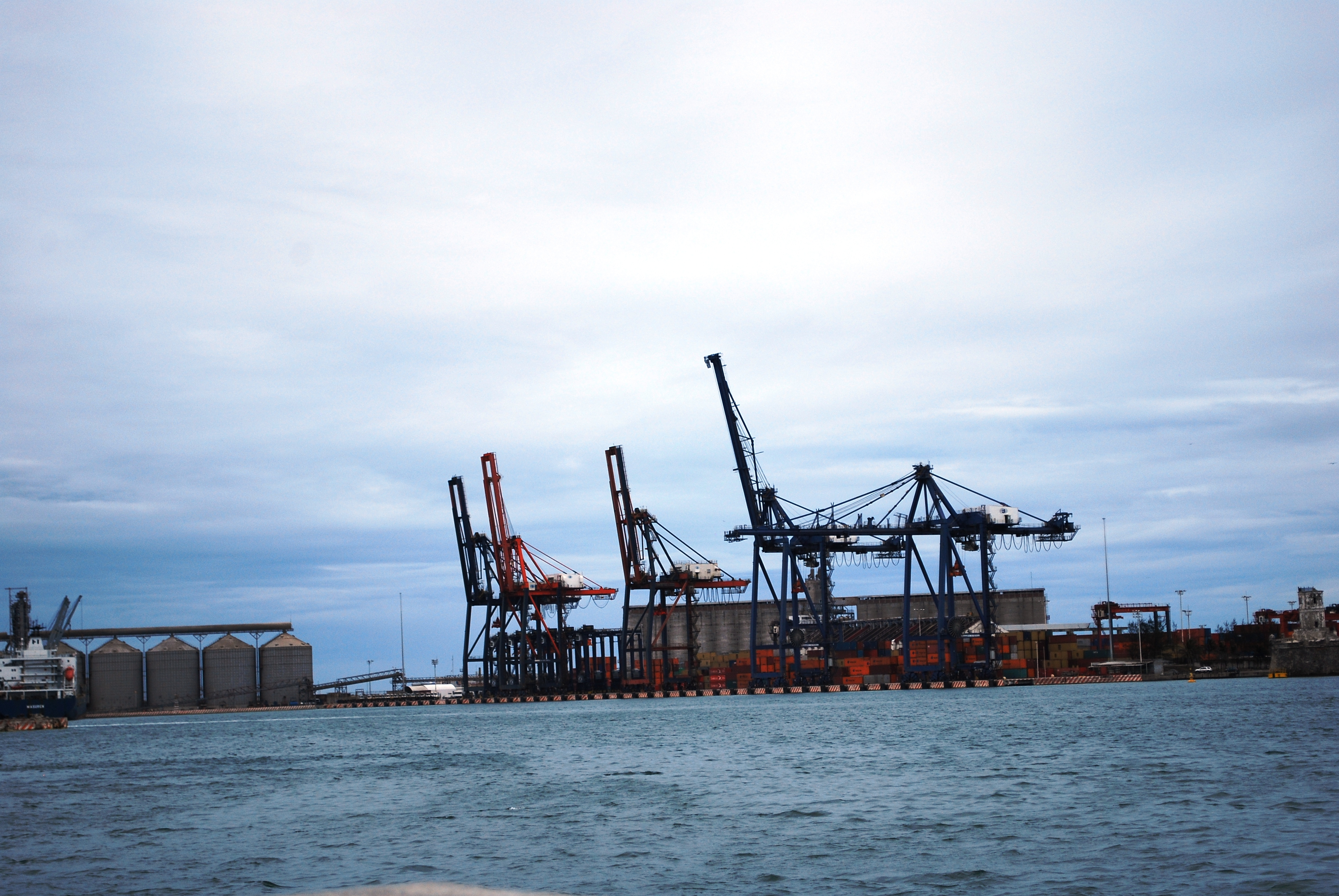
A portion of the port of Veracruz

| GDP per capita PPP | US $16,900 (2012–15) |
| GNI per capita PPP | US $16,500 (2012–15) |
| Inflation (CPI) | 3.7% (February 2021) |
| Gini index | 43.4 (World Bank 2016) |
| Unemployment | 4.5% (January 2021) |
| HDI | ▲0.779 (2020) |
| Labor force | 78.4 million (2011) |
| Pop. in poverty | 13.8% |

According to the International Monetary Fund, Mexico's gross domestic product (GDP) in 2025 was US$1.84 trillion at market exchange rates and US$3.43 trillion in purchasing power parity (PPP) terms, or about US$13,760 and US$25,680 per capita, respectively. The World Bank classifies Mexico as an upper-middle-income country. Annual median disposable income was $6,090 PPP in 2021. Growth has been modest in recent years: the IMF estimates real GDP growth of 3.1% in 2023, 1.5% in 2024 and 0.5% in 2025, while INEGI's revised figure for 2025 was 0.8% (seasonally adjusted). This is generally considered to be below Mexico's potential growth.

The Mexican peso is the currency (ISO 4217: MXN; symbol: $). One peso is divided into 100 centavos. MXN replaced MXP in 1993 at a rate of 1,000 MXP per 1 MXN. The exchange rate remained relatively stable between 1998 and 2006, fluctuating between 10.20 and 11.50 MXN per US dollar. The peso lost 19.87% of its value in 2016 and reached about 20.37 per dollar in 2017. It strengthened to below 17 per dollar in 2023, and the Bank of Mexico's FIX rate was 18.6425 per dollar on October 21, 2026. Measured against the US dollar, the peso has depreciated by more than 7,500% since 1910. After an easing cycle that began in 2024, the Bank of Mexico cut its benchmark interest rate to 6.50% in May 2026 and has held it at that level since. Annual average inflation was 3.8% in 2025, close to the central bank's 3% target.

Mexico's unemployment rate is low by international standards (2.7% in the second quarter of 2026), but about 55% of workers are employed in the informal economy and 6.9% are underemployed. Mexico's Human Development Index was 0.789 in 2023, ranking 81st in the world and placing it in the "high human development" category.

Development

The following table shows the main economic indicators for 1980–2025 (with IMF staff estimates for 2026–2031). Inflation below 5% is in green.

| Year | GDP (in billion US$PPP) | GDP per capita (in US$ PPP) | GDP (in billion US$nominal) | GDP per capita (in US$ nominal) | GDP growth (real) | Inflation rate (in Percent) | Unemployment (in Percent) | Government debt (in % of GDP) |
|---|---|---|---|---|---|---|---|---|
| 1980 | 441.5 | 6,486.1 | 242.2 | 3,557.3 | ▲9.5% | ▲26.5% | 1.2% | n/a |
| 1981 | ▲529.6 | ▲7,596.9 | ▲311.0 | ▲4,461.2 | ▲9.6% | ▲28.0% | ▼0.9% | n/a |
| 1982 | ▲562.1 | ▲7,875.5 | ▼225.7 | ▼3,162.5 | 0.0% | ▲59.1% | ▲4.2% | n/a |
| 1983 | ▼557.1 | ▼7,627.5 | ▼184.0 | ▼2,519.5 | ▼-4.6% | ▲101.8% | ▲6.1% | n/a |
| 1984 | ▲597.5 | ▲7,997.3 | ▲217.0 | ▲2,904.7 | ▲3.5% | ▲65.4% | ▼5.6% | n/a |
| 1985 | ▲628.2 | ▲8,224.9 | ▲230.3 | ▲3,015.0 | ▲1.9% | ▲57.8% | ▼4.4% | n/a |
| 1986 | ▼615.6 | ▼7,889.9 | ▼159.4 | ▼2,043.3 | ▼-3.9% | ▲86.4% | ▼4.3% | n/a |
| 1987 | ▲643.9 | ▲8,082.8 | ▲174.8 | ▲2,194.7 | ▲2.1% | ▲132.0% | ▼3.9% | n/a |
| 1988 | ▲674.7 | ▲8,301.2 | ▲213.9 | ▲2,631.5 | ▲1.2% | ▲113.5% | ▼3.5% | n/a |
| 1989 | ▲726.6 | ▲8,766.1 | ▲260.7 | ▲3,144.7 | ▲3.6% | ▲19.9% | ▼2.9% | n/a |
| 1990 | ▲793.4 | ▲9,388.9 | ▲307.6 | ▲3,640.3 | ▲5.3% | ▲26.7% | ▼2.7% | n/a |
| 1991 | ▲852.8 | ▲9,902.1 | ▲368.8 | ▲4,281.7 | ▲4.0% | ▲22.6% | 2.7% | n/a |
| 1992 | ▲903.4 | ▲10,294.8 | ▲427.7 | ▲4,873.5 | ▲3.6% | ▲15.5% | ▲2.8% | n/a |
| 1993 | ▲951.3 | ▲10,645.5 | ▲530.2 | ▲5,933.3 | ▲2.9% | ▲9.8% | ▲3.4% | n/a |
| 1994 | ▲1,014.3 | ▲11,152.3 | ▲553.6 | ▲6,086.8 | ▲4.4% | ▲7.0% | ▲3.7% | n/a |
| 1995 | ▼974.4 | ▼10,533.2 | ▼380.2 | ▼4,109.8 | ▼-5.9% | ▲35.1% | ▲6.2% | n/a |
| 1996 | ▲1,053.9 | ▲11,211.4 | ▲432.2 | ▲4,597.2 | ▲6.2% | ▲34.3% | ▼5.5% | 42.5% |
| 1997 | ▲1,149.3 | ▲12,042.3 | ▲523.5 | ▲5,484.7 | ▲7.2% | ▲20.6% | ▼3.7% | ▼39.1% |
| 1998 | ▲1,234.1 | ▲12,749.0 | ▲557.5 | ▲5,759.2 | ▲6.2% | ▲15.9% | ▼3.2% | ▲39.7% |
| 1999 | ▲1,286.0 | ▲13,111.4 | ▲631.2 | ▲6,435.6 | ▲2.8% | ▲16.6% | ▼2.5% | ▲41.7% |
| 2000 | ▲1,381.3 | ▲13,900.8 | ▲742.1 | ▲7,467.7 | ▲5.0% | ▲9.5% | ▼2.2% | ▼38.5% |
| 2001 | ▲1,406.0 | ▲13,957.3 | ▲796.1 | ▲7,902.1 | ▼-0.5% | ▲6.4% | ▲2.8% | ▼37.3% |
| 2002 | ▲1,424.5 | ▼13,943.0 | ▲810.7 | ▲7,934.7 | ▼-0.2% | ▲5.0% | ▲3.0% | ▲39.9% |
| 2003 | ▲1,469.9 | ▲14,189.5 | ▼765.5 | ▼7,390.3 | ▲1.2% | ▲4.6% | ▲3.4% | ▲42.1% |
| 2004 | ▲1,563.2 | ▲14,891.8 | ▲819.5 | ▲7,806.6 | ▲3.6% | ▲4.7% | ▲3.9% | ▼38.9% |
| 2005 | ▲1,646.3 | ▲15,476.9 | ▲917.6 | ▲8,626.2 | ▲2.1% | ▲4.0% | ▼3.5% | ▼36.8% |
| 2006 | ▲1,778.6 | ▲16,486.0 | ▲1,020.3 | ▲9,456.9 | ▲4.8% | ▲3.6% | ▲3.6% | ▼35.8% |
| 2007 | ▲1,864.7 | ▲17,023.7 | ▲1,102.4 | ▲10,063.6 | ▲2.1% | ▲4.0% | ▲3.7% | ▼35.5% |
| 2008 | ▲1,918.6 | ▲17,241.8 | ▲1,161.6 | ▲10,438.5 | ▲0.9% | ▲5.1% | ▲3.9% | ▲40.6% |
| 2009 | ▼1,808.9 | ▼16,003.8 | ▼943.4 | ▼8,346.8 | ▼-6.3% | ▲5.3% | ▲5.4% | ▲41.7% |
| 2010 | ▲1,921.9 | ▲16,747.8 | ▲1,105.4 | ▲9,632.8 | ▲5.0% | ▲4.2% | ▼5.3% | ▼40.2% |
| 2011 | ▲2,029.1 | ▲17,425.4 | ▲1,229.0 | ▲10,554.4 | ▲3.4% | ▲3.4% | ▼5.2% | ▲41.2% |
| 2012 | ▲2,140.3 | ▲18,129.2 | ▲1,255.1 | ▲10,631.1 | ▲3.6% | ▲4.1% | ▼4.9% | ▼40.8% |
| 2013 | ▲2,195.3 | ▲18,355.9 | ▲1,327.4 | ▲11,099.2 | ▲0.9% | ▲3.8% | 4.9% | ▲44.1% |
| 2014 | ▲2,289.5 | ▲18,913.8 | ▲1,364.5 | ▲11,272.4 | ▲2.5% | ▲4.0% | ▼4.8% | ▲47.1% |
| 2015 | ▲2,373.2 | ▲19,393.7 | ▼1,213.3 | ▼9,915.1 | ▲2.7% | ▲2.7% | ▼4.3% | ▲51.0% |
| 2016 | ▲2,438.2 | ▲19,728.5 | ▼1,112.2 | ▼8,999.6 | ▲1.8% | ▲2.8% | ▼3.9% | ▲55.0% |
| 2017 | ▲2,528.3 | ▲20,262.6 | ▲1,190.7 | ▲9,542.8 | ▲1.9% | ▲6.0% | ▼3.4% | ▼52.5% |
| 2018 | ▲2,606.3 | ▲20,685.3 | ▲1,256.3 | ▲9,971.0 | ▲2.0% | ▲4.9% | ▼3.3% | ▼52.2% |
| 2019 | ▲2,636.5 | ▲20,724.9 | ▲1,304.1 | ▲10,251.1 | ▼-0.4% | ▲3.6% | ▲3.5% | ▼51.9% |
| 2020 | ▼2,454.1 | ▼19,141.3 | ▼1,121.1 | ▼8,744.0 | ▼-8.4% | ▲3.4% | ▲4.4% | ▲58.5% |
| 2021 | ▲2,684.7 | ▲20,814.1 | ▲1,316.6 | ▲10,207.3 | ▲6.0% | ▲5.7% | ▼4.1% | ▼56.7% |
| 2022 | ▲2,983.1 | ▲22,953.7 | ▲1,466.9 | ▲11,287.5 | ▲3.7% | ▲7.9% | ▼3.3% | ▼53.8% |
| 2023 | ▲3,191.6 | ▲24,338.0 | ▲1,794.7 | ▲13,685.7 | ▲3.1% | ▲5.5% | ▼2.8% | ▼52.7% |
| 2024 | ▲3,321.1 | ▲25,107.7 | ▲1,834.6 | ▲13,870.0 | ▲1.5% | ▲4.7% | ▼2.7% | ▲59.0% |
| 2025 | ▲3,425.5 | ▲25,684.5 | ▲1,835.0 | ▼13,759.3 | ▲0.5% | ▲3.8% | ▼2.6% | ▲61.7% |
| 2026 | ▲3,594.4 | ▲26,742.6 | ▲2,176.2 | ▲16,191.4 | ▲1.5% | ▲3.8% | ▲2.8% | ▲62.1% |
| 2027 | ▲3,772.4 | ▲27,862.9 | ▲2,314.5 | ▲17,095.0 | ▲1.8% | ▲3.6% | 2.8% | ▲62.9% |
| 2028 | ▲3,933.4 | ▲28,853.8 | ▲2,425.0 | ▲17,788.9 | ▲2.2% | ▲3.1% | 2.8% | ▲63.4% |
| 2029 | ▲4,094.2 | ▲29,841.3 | ▲2,538.4 | ▲18,501.2 | ▲2.1% | ▲3.0% | 2.8% | ▲64.0% |
| 2030 | ▲4,257.7 | ▲30,845.6 | ▲2,654.4 | ▲19,230.2 | ▲2.1% | ▲3.0% | 2.8% | ▲64.3% |
| 2031 | ▲4,421.9 | ▲31,852.2 | ▲2,778.5 | ▲20,014.1 | ▲2.1% | ▲3.0% | 2.8% | ▲64.5% |

=== Labor workforce ===
The country's total labor force sits at roughly 60.9 million people, with the overall participation rate hovering between 58% and 59%. Employment is heavily concentrated in services, followed by the manufacturing and agricultural sectors. According to OECD data, Mexican laborers work some of the longest hours globally, averaging the highest annual hours worked per worker alongside Colombia and Costa Rica. The Confederation of Mexican Workers (CTM) stands as the largest union confederation in the nation.

=== Informal economy ===
The informal economy in Mexico is a major structural feature of its labor market, with nearly half of the population (approximately 51-56% nationally as of 2019) engaged in informal work. Informal workers, including street vendors and home-based workers, generally lack social protection and formal contracts. While sometimes associated with lower productivity, it serves as a crucial income source for many.

=== Poverty ===
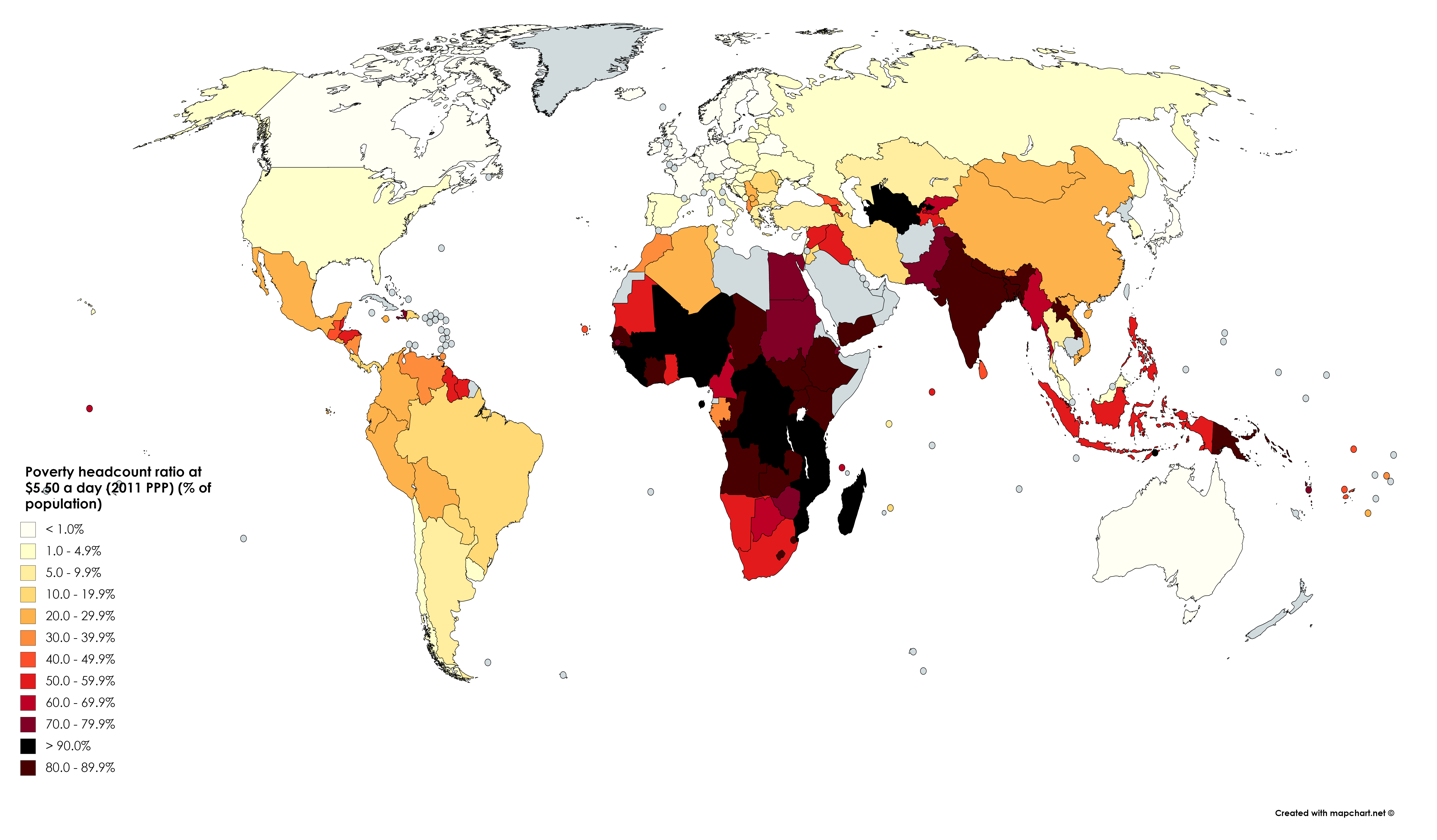
Poverty headcount ratio at $5.50 a day (2011 PPP) (% of population). Based on World Bank data ranging from 1998 to 2018.

Poverty in Mexico is measured under parameters such as nutrition, clean water, housing, education, health care, social security, quality and availability of basic services in households, income, and social cohesion, as defined by social development laws in the country. It is divided into two categories: moderate poverty and extreme poverty.

While 2.33% of Mexico's population lives below the international poverty line of $3.00 a day set by the World Bank, as of 2024, Mexico's government estimates that 24.2% of the population lives in moderate poverty and 5.3% lives in extreme poverty, resulting in 29.6% of Mexico's total population living below the national poverty line. The gap might be explained by the government's adoption of the multidimensional poverty method as a way to measure poverty. This method defines a person with income above the "international poverty line" or "welfare line", set by the Mexican government, as "moderately poor" if they have one or more deficiencies related to social rights, such as education (they did not complete their studies), nutrition (malnutrition or obesity), or living standards (access to basic services such as water or electricity, and secondary household goods, such as refrigerators). The Mexican government defines extreme poverty as deficiencies in both social rights and income below the "welfare line". Additional figures from SEDESOL (Mexico's social development agency) estimate that 6% of the population (7.4 million people) lives in extreme poverty and suffers from food insecurity.

Recently, significant changes in government economic policy and attempts at reducing government intervention through privatization of various sectors for better or worse, allowed Mexico to remain Latin America's largest economy up until 2005, when it became the second largest; and a so-called "trillion dollar club" member. Despite these changes, Mexico continues to suffer from significant social inequality and a lack of opportunities. The Peña Nieto administration attempted to reduce poverty in the country by providing more opportunities to its citizens such as jobs, education, and the installation of universal healthcare.

Poverty, which had increased during the 2008–2018 decade, experienced a historic decline between 2018 and 2024 under the López Obrador administration, falling from 42% to 29.6% of the population. This was primarily due to the substantial increase in the minimum wage and, to a lesser extent, to social welfare policies.

==== Income inequality ====
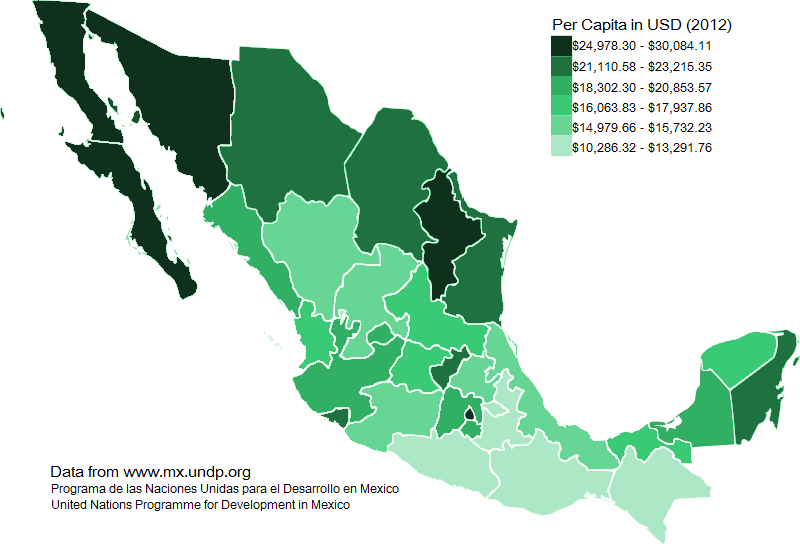
The GDP per capita of Mexican states in USD, 2012.

A single person in Mexico, Carlos Slim, has a net worth equal to six percent of GDP. Additionally, only 10% of Mexicans account for 25% of Mexican GDP. A smaller group, 3.5%, represent 12.5% of Mexican GDP.

According to the OECD, Mexico has the second-highest degree of economic disparity between the extremely poor and extremely rich, after Chile – although this gap has been diminishing over the last decade. The bottom 10% of the income distribution accounts for 1.36% of the country's resources, whereas the top 10% accounts for almost 36%. OECD also notes that Mexico's budgeted expenses for poverty alleviation and social development are only about a third of the OECD average, both in absolute and relative terms. According to the World Bank 2004, 17.6% of Mexico's population lived in extreme poverty, while 21% lived in moderate poverty.

=== Pensions ===
Mexico reformed its pension system in 1997, transforming it from a pay as you go (PAYG), defined benefit (DB) scheme to a fully funded, private and mandatory defined contribution (DC) scheme. The reform was modeled after the pension reforms in Chile in the early 1980s, and was a result of recommendations from the World Bank. On December 10, 2020, the Mexican pension system would again undergo a major reform.

=== Remittances ===
Mexico was the fourth-largest receiver of remittances in the world in 2017. Remittances, or contributions sent by Mexicans living abroad, mostly in the United States, to their families at home in Mexico comprised $28.5 billion in 2017. In 2015, remittances overtook oil to become the single largest foreign source of income for Mexico, larger than any other sector.

The growth of remittances has more than doubled since 1997. Recorded remittance transactions exceeded 41 million in 2003, of which 86 percent were made by electronic transfer.

The Mexican government, cognizant of the needs of migrant workers, began issuing an upgraded version of the Matrícula Consular de Alta Seguridad (MACS, High Security Consular Identification), an identity document issued at Mexican consulates abroad. This document is now accepted as a valid identity card in 32 US states, as well as thousands of police agencies, hundreds of cities and counties, and banking institutions.

The main states receiving remittances in 2014 were Michoacán, Guanajuato, Jalisco, the State of Mexico and Puebla, which jointly captured 45% of total remittances in that year. Several state governments, with the support of the federal government, have implemented programs to use part of the remittances to finance public works. This program, called Dos por Uno (Two for everyone), is designed so that for each peso contributed by migrants through remittances, the state and federal governments will invest two pesos in infrastructure in their home communities.

=== Regional economies ===
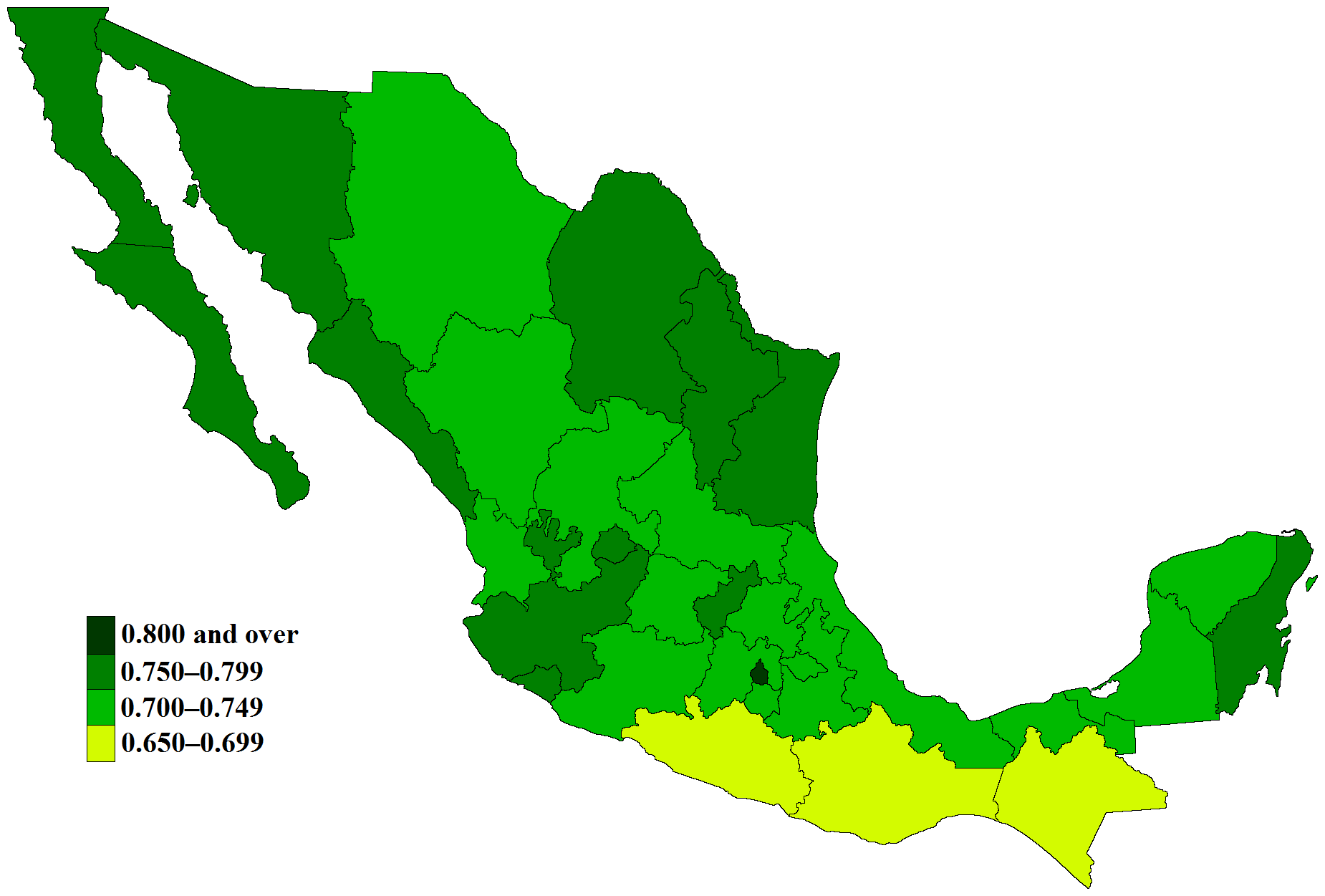
Mexican States by Human Development Index, 2015.

Regional disparities and income inequality are features of the Mexican economy. While all constituent states of the federation have a Human Development Index (HDI) above 0.70 (medium to high development), the northern and central states have higher HDI values than the southern states. Nuevo León, Jalisco, and the Federal District have HDI levels similar to European countries, whereas those of Oaxaca and Chiapas are similar to those of China or Vietnam.

At the municipal level, economic disparities are even greater: Benito Juárez borough in Mexico City has an HDI similar to that of Germany or New Zealand, whereas Metlatónoc in Guerrero would have an HDI identical to that of Malawi. The majority of the federal entities in the north have a high development (higher than 0.80), as well as the entities Colima, Jalisco, Aguascalientes, the Federal District, Querétaro and the southeastern states of Quintana Roo and Campeche). The less developed states (with medium development, HDI> 0.70) are located along the southern Pacific coast.

In terms of share of the GDP by economic sector (in 2004), the largest contributors in agriculture are Jalisco (9.7%), Sinaloa (7.7%), and Veracruz (7.6%); the greatest contributors in industrial production are the Federal District (15.8%), State of México (11.8%) and Nuevo León (7.9%); the greatest contributors in the service sector are also the Federal District (25.3%), State of México (8.9%) and Nuevo León (7.5%).

Since the 1980s, the economy has gradually become less centralized; the Federal District's annual GDP growth rate from 2003 to 2004 was the smallest among federal entities at 0.2%, with sharp declines in the agriculture and industrial sectors. Nonetheless, it still accounts for 21.8% of the nation's GDP. The states with the highest GDP growth rates are Quintana Roo (9.0%), Baja California (8.9%), and San Luis Potosí (8.2%). In 2000, the federal entities with the highest GDP per capita in Mexico were the Federal District (US$26,320), Campeche (US$18,900) and Nuevo León (US$30,250); the states with the lowest GDP per capita were Chiapas (US$3,302), Oaxaca (US$4,100) and Guerrero (US$6,800).

=== Companies ===
Of the world's 2000 largest companies, ranked in the Forbes Global 2000, 13 are headquartered in Mexico. Three are also among the 500 largest companies, as measured by the Fortune Global 500.

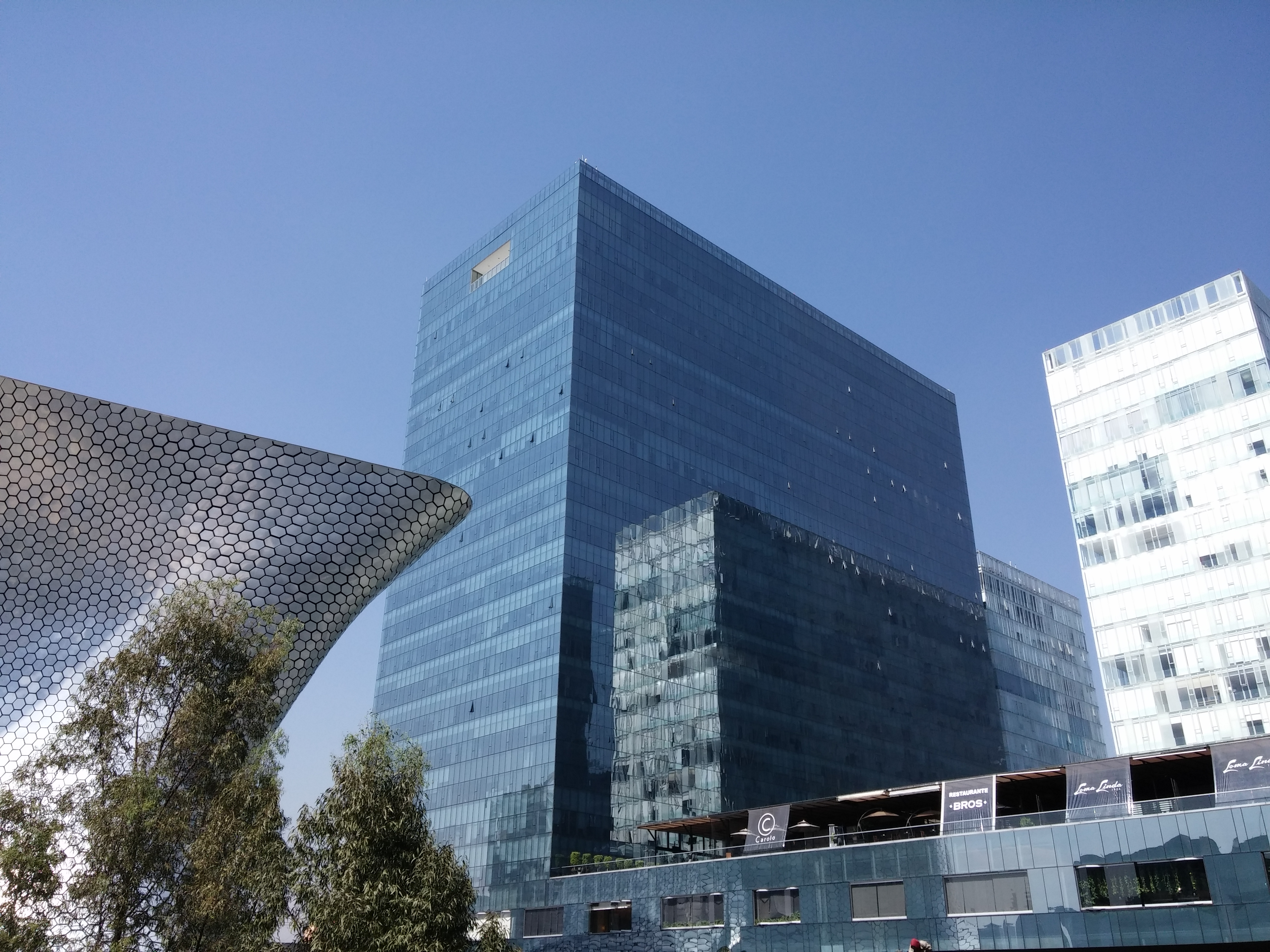
América Móvil headquarters in Mexico City

The list includes the largest Mexican companies in 2023:

| Rank | Forbes 2000 rank | Name | Headquarters | Revenue (billions US$) | Industry |
|---|---|---|---|---|---|
| 1 | 177 | América Móvil | Mexico City | 43.57 | Telecommunications |
| 2 | 312 | Fomento Económico Mexicano | Monterrey | 35.86 | Beverages |
| 3 | 375 | Banorte | Monterrey | 16.82 | Finance |
| 4 | 496 | Grupo México | Mexico City | 13.93 | Mining |
| 5 | 610 | Grupo Bimbo | Mexico City | 20.74 | Food processing |
| 6 | 1048 | Inbursa | Mexico City | 4 | Financial services |
| 7 | 1071 | Cemex | Monterrey | 15.93 | Building material |
| 8 | 1130 | Arca Continental | Monterrey | 10..8 | Beverages |
| 9 | 1188 | Grupo Carso | Mexico City | 10.18 | Conglomerate |
| 10 | 1384 | ALFA | Monterrey | 18.27 | Conglomerate |
| 11 | 1558 | El Puerto de Liverpool | Mexico City | 8.75 | Retail |
| 12 | 1606 | Grupo Elektra | Mexico City | 8.19 | Finance |
| 13 | 1743 | Fibra Uno | Mexico City | 1.17 | Real Estate |

== Economic sectors ==
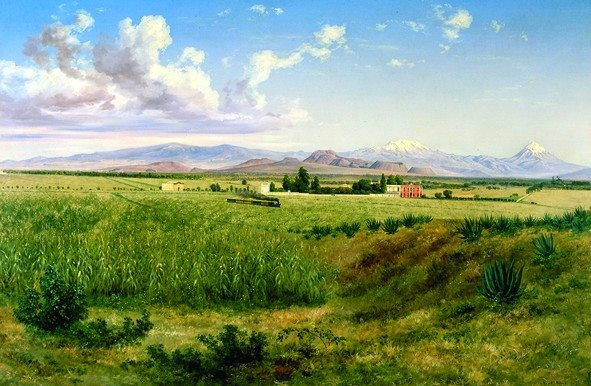
Hacienda of San Antonio Coapa by José María Velasco Gómez.

Gross Domestic Product (GDP) in purchasing power parity (PPP) in 2024 was estimated at US$3,43 trillion, and GDP per capita in PPP at US$25,963. The service sector is the largest component of GDP at 70.5%, followed by the industrial sector at 25.7% (2006 est.). Agriculture represents only 3.9% of GDP (2006 est.). The Mexican labor force is estimated at 38 million, of which 18% is employed in agriculture, 24% in industry, and 58% in the service sector (2003 est.). Mexico's largest source of foreign income is remittances.

=== Agriculture ===
Agriculture as a percentage of total GDP has been steadily declining and now resembles that of developed nations, playing a smaller role in the economy. In 2006, agriculture accounted for 3.9% of GDP, down from 7% in 1990, and 25% in 1970. Given the historic structure of ejidos, it employs a considerably high percentage of the workforce: 18% in 2003, mostly of which grows basic crops for subsistence, compared to 2–5% in developed nations in which production is highly mechanized.

==== History ====
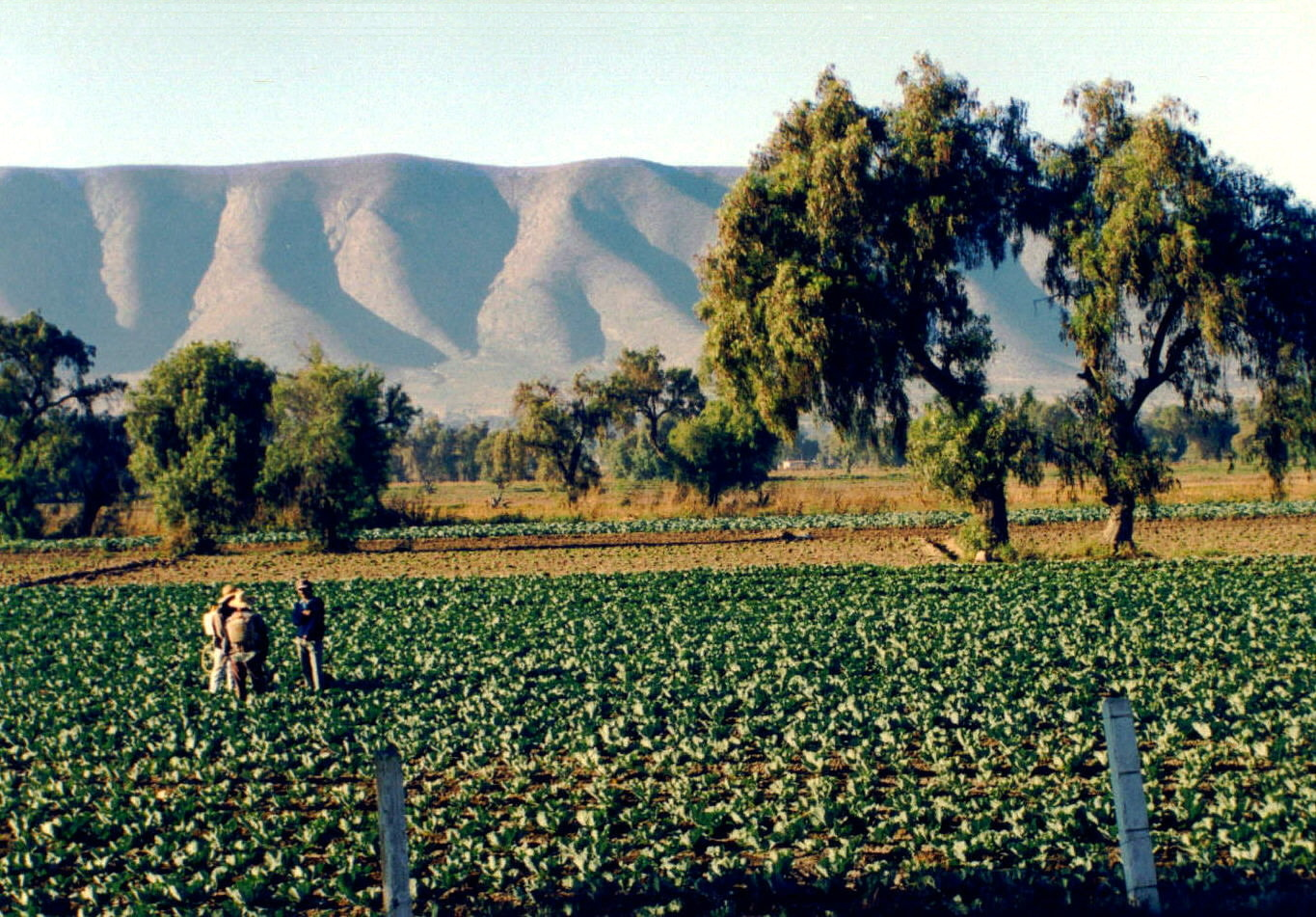
Farmers in Puebla

Food and agriculture
| Product | Quantity (Tm) | World Rank^{1} |
|---|---|---|
| Avocados | 1,040,390 | 1 |
| Onions and chayote | 1,130,660 | 1 |
| Limes and lemons | 1,824,890 | 1 |
| Sunflower seed | 212,765 | 1 |
| Dry fruits | 95,150 | 2 |
| Papaya | 955,694 | 2 |
| Chillies and peppers | 1,853,610 | 2 |
| Whole beans | 93 000 | 3 |
| Oranges | 3,969,810 | 3 |
| Anise, badian, fennel | 32 500 | 3 |
| Chicken meat | 2,245,000 | 3 |
| Asparagus | 67,247 | 4 |
| Mangoes | 1.503.010 | 4 |
| Corn | 20,000,000 | 4 |
^{1}Source:FAO

After the Mexican Revolution, Mexico began an agrarian reform, based on the 27th article of the Mexican Constitution than included transfer of land and/or free land distribution to peasants and small farmers under the concept of the ejido. This program was further extended during President Cárdenas' administration during the 1930s and continued into the 1960s at varying rates. The cooperative agrarian reform, which guaranteed small farmers a means of subsistence livelihood, also caused land fragmentation and lack of capital investment, since commonly held land could not be used as collateral. To raise rural productivity and living standards, this constitutional article was amended in 1992 to allow the transfer of property rights in communal lands to farmers cultivating them. With the ability to rent or sell it, a way was open for the creation of larger farms and the advantages of economies of scale. Large mechanized farms are now operating in some northwestern states (mainly in Sinaloa). However, privatization of ejidos continues to be very slow in the central and southern states where the great majority of peasants produce only for subsistence.

Until the 1980s, the government encouraged the production of basic crops (mainly corn and beans) by maintaining support prices and controlling imports through the National Company for Popular Subsistence (CONASUPO). With trade liberalization, however, CONASUPO was gradually dismantled, and two new mechanisms were implemented: Alianza and Procampo. Alianza provides income payments and incentives for mechanization and advanced irrigation systems. Procampo is an income-transfer subsidy for farmers. This support program offers 3.5 million farmers who produce basic commodities (mostly corn), representing 64% of all farmers, with a fixed income transfer payment per unit of cropland area. This subsidy increased substantially during President Fox's administration, mainly to white corn producers, to reduce imports from the United States. This program has been successful, and in 2004, roughly only 15% of corn imports were white corn –the one used for human consumption and the type that is mostly grown in Mexico– as opposed to 85% of yellow and crushed corn –the one used for feeding livestock, and which is barely produced in Mexico.

==== Crops ====
Despite corn being a staple in the Mexican diet, Mexico's comparative advantage in agriculture lies not in corn, but in horticulture, tropical fruits, and vegetables. Negotiators of NAFTA expected that through liberalization and mechanization of agriculture, two-thirds of Mexican corn producers would naturally shift from corn production to horticultural and other labor-intensive crops such as fruits, nuts, vegetables, coffee, and sugar cane. While horticultural trade has drastically increased due to NAFTA, it has not absorbed displaced workers from corn production (estimated at 600,000). Corn production has remained stable (at 20 million metric tons), arguably as a result of income support to farmers or a reluctance to abandon a millenarian tradition in Mexico: not only have peasants grown corn for millennia; corn originated in Mexico. Mexico is the seventh-largest corn producer in the world.

===== Potatoes =====
The area dedicated to potatoes has changed little since 1980, and average yields have almost tripled since 1961. Production reached a record 1.7 million tonnes in 2003. Per capita potato consumption in Mexico stands at 17 kg a year, very low compared to its maize intake of 400 kg. On average, potato farms in Mexico are larger than those devoted to more basic food crops. Potato production in Mexico is mostly for commercial purposes; the production for household consumption is very small.

===== Avocado =====
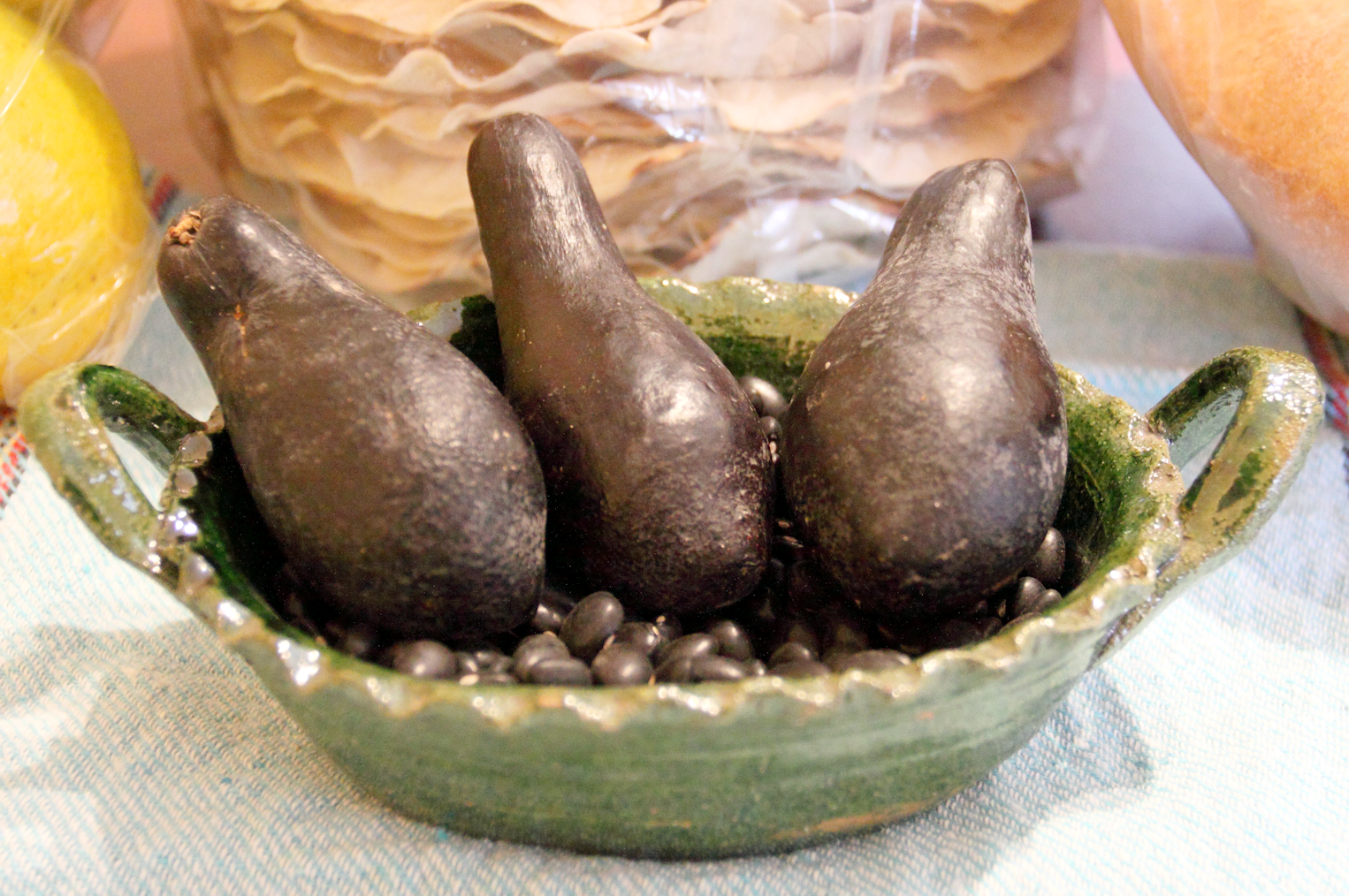
Mexico is the world's leading producer of avocados as of 2020, supplying nearly 30% of the global harvest in that year.

Mexico is the world's largest avocado- growing country, producing several times more than the second-largest producer. In 2013, the total area dedicated to avocado production was 188,723 hectares (466,340 acres), and the harvest in 2017 was 2.03 million tonnes. The state that produces the most is Michoacán, which produces nearly 75% of all Mexican avocados.

===== Sugar cane =====
Approximately 160,000 medium-sized farmers grow sugar cane in 15 Mexican states; currently there are 54 sugar mills around the country that produced 4.96 million tons of sugar in the 2010 crop, compared to 5.8 million tons in 2001. Mexico's sugar industry is characterized by high production costs and a lack of investment. Mexico produces more sugar than it consumes. Sugar cane is grown on 700,000 farms in Mexico with a yield of 72 metric tons per farm.

=== Mining ===
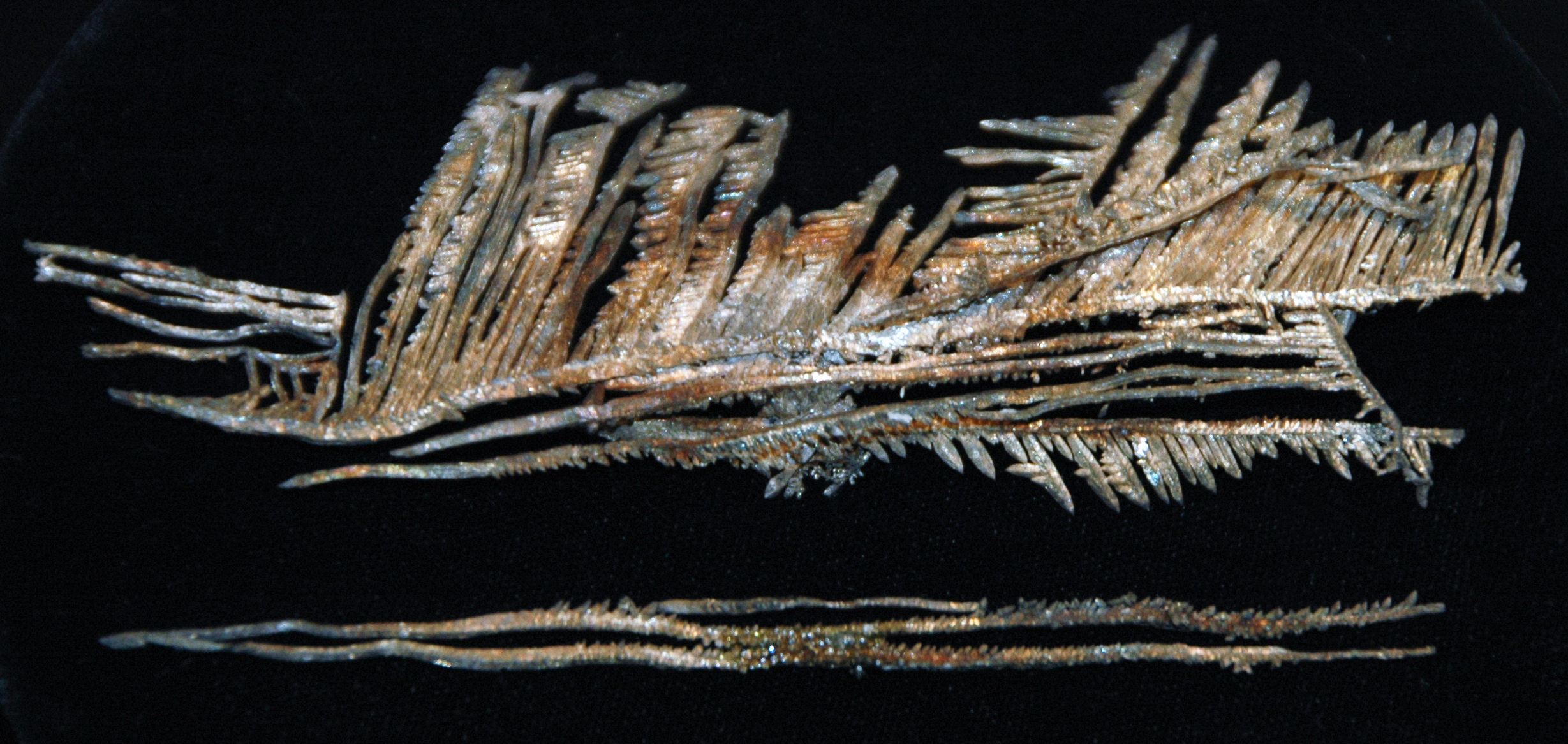
Mexico is the world's leading producer of silver.

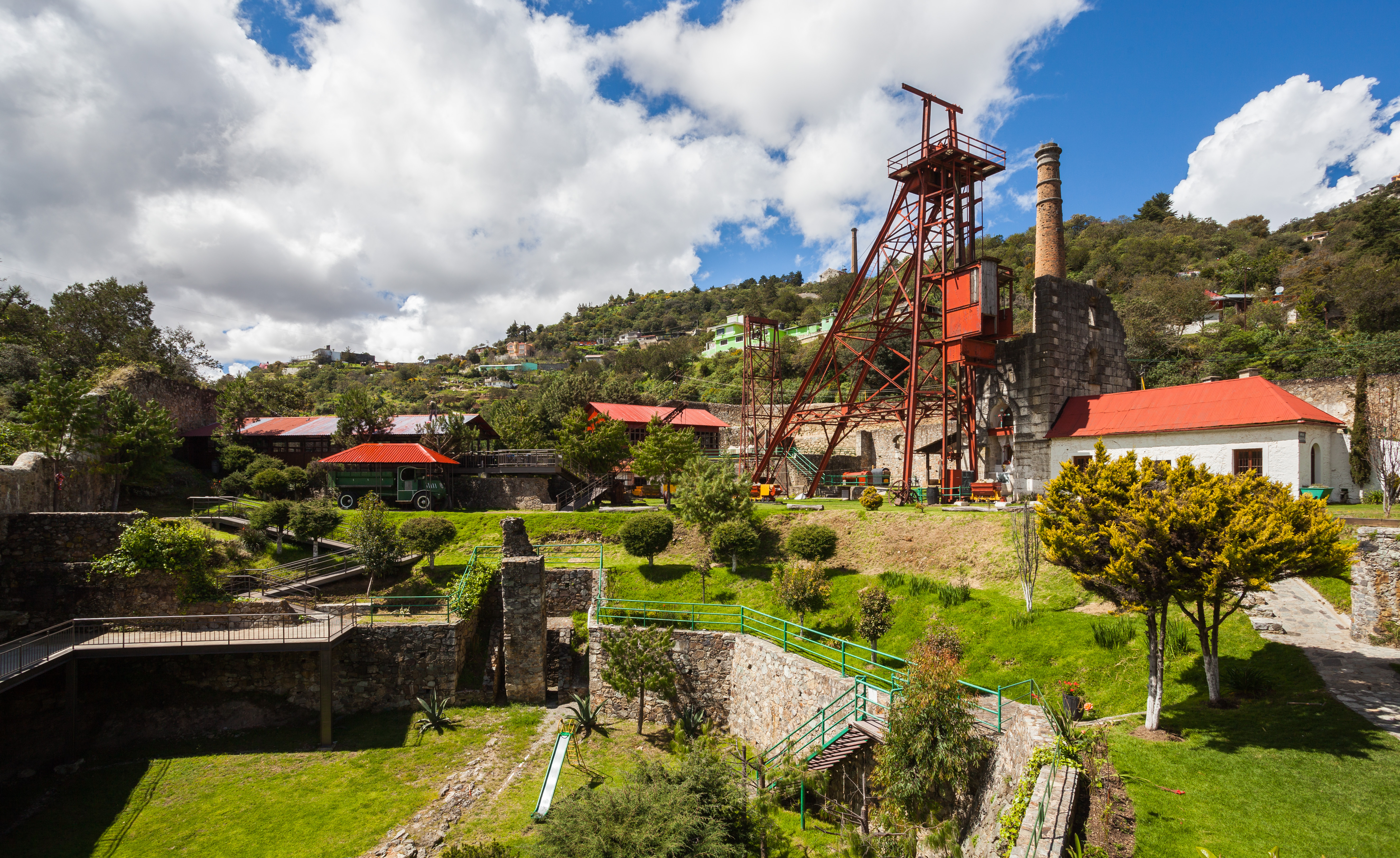
The former Acosta mine, now a museum in Hidalgo

In 2019, the country was the world's largest producer of silver 9th largest producer of gold, the 8th largest producer of copper, the world's 5th largest producer of lead, the world's 6th largest producer of zinc, the world's 5th largest producer of molybdenum, the world's 3rd largest producer of mercury, the world's 5th largest producer of bismuth, the world's 13th largest producer of manganese and the 23rd largest world producer of phosphate. It is also the 8th largest world producer of salt.

In April 2022, the Senate passed a law that nationalizes the lithium mining industry in the country. The federal government will monopolize all new lithium mines in the country, but existing operations will be allowed to continue in private hands. Critics of the move argue that the constitution already does this and that the government lacks the technical capacity to mine the major reserves, which are mostly in clay deposits that are difficult to mine. The government made a similar failed attempt to nationalize uranium mining in the 1980s.

=== Industry ===
Industrial production
| Main industries | Aircraft, automobile industry, petrochemicals, cement and construction, textiles, food and beverages, mining, consumer durables, tourism |
| Industrial growth rate | 3.6% (2006) |
| Labor force | 29% of total labor force |
| GDP of sector | 25.7% of total GDP |

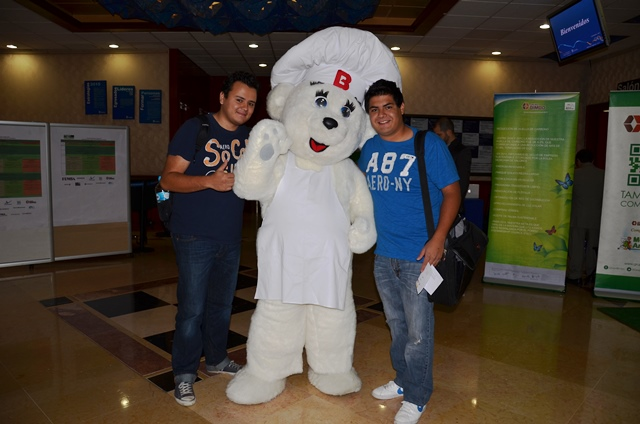
Osito Bimbo, the corporate mascot of Grupo Bimbo

The industrial sector has benefited from trade liberalization; in 2000, it accounted for almost 50% of all export earnings.

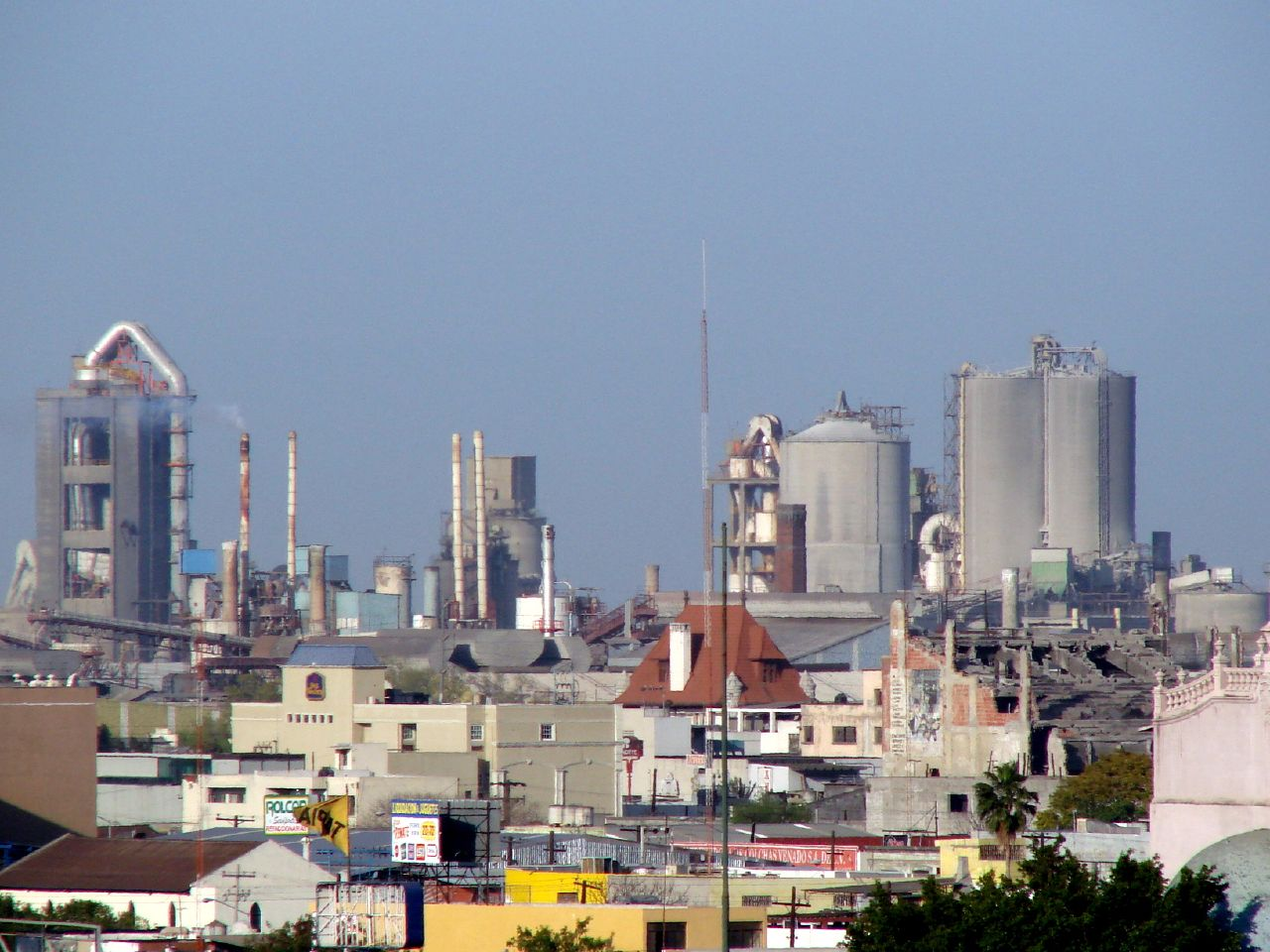
A Cemex plant on the outskirts of Monterrey.

Among Mexico's most important industrial sectors is the automotive industry, whose quality standards are internationally recognized. The automobile sector in Mexico differs from that in other Latin American countries and developing nations in that it does not operate solely as a mere assembler. The industry produces technologically complex components and engages in some research and development activities, an example of that is the new Volkswagen Jetta model with up to 70% of parts designed in Mexico.

The "Big Three" (General Motors, Ford and Chrysler) have been operating in Mexico since the 1930s, while Volkswagen and Nissan built their plants in the 1960s. Later, Toyota, Honda, BMW, and Mercedes-Benz have also participated. Given the high requirements of North American components in the industry, many European and Asian parts suppliers have also moved to Mexico: in Puebla alone, 70 industrial part-makers cluster around Volkswagen.

The relatively small domestic car industry is represented by DINA Camiones, a manufacturer of trucks, busses and military vehicles, which through domestic production and purchases of foreign bus manufacturers has become the largest bus manufacturer in the world; Vehizero that builds hybrid trucks and the new car companies Mastretta design that builds the Mastretta MXT sports car and Autobuses King that plans to build 10000 microbuses by 2015, nevertheless new car companies are emerging among them CIMEX that has developed a sport utility truck, the Conin, and it is to be released in September 2010 in Mexico's national auto show, And the new electric car maker Grupo Electrico Motorizado. Some large industries of Mexico include Cemex, the world's largest construction company and the third largest cement producer the alcohol beverage industries, including world-renowned players like Grupo Modelo; conglomerates like FEMSA, which apart from being the largest single producer of alcoholic beverages and owning multiple commercial interests such OXXO convenience store chain, is also the second-largest Coca-Cola bottler in the world; Gruma, the largest producer of corn flour and tortillas in the world; and Grupo Bimbo, Telmex, Televisa, among many others. In 2005, according to the World Bank, high-tech industrial production represented 19.6% of total exports.

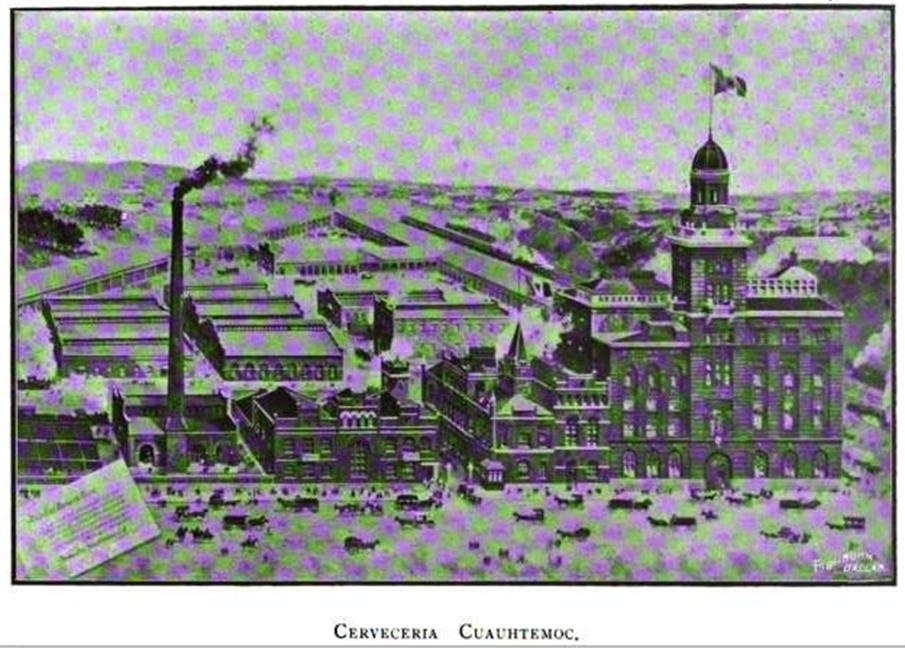
The original Cuauhtémoc Moctezuma Brewery in Monterrey, founded in 1889. Today, it still operates as a brewery and houses two museums.

Maquiladoras (manufacturing plants that take in imported raw materials and produce goods for domestic consumption and export on behalf of foreign companies) have become a hallmark of trade in Mexico. This sector has benefited from NAFTA: real income in the maquiladora sector has increased by 15.5% since 1994, though the non-maquiladora industry has grown much faster. Contrary to popular belief, this should be no surprise since maquiladoras' products could enter the US duty-free since a 1960s industry agreement. Other sectors now benefit from the free trade agreement, and the share of exports from non-border states has increased in the last 5 years, while the share of exports from maquiladora-border states has decreased.

Currently, Mexico is focusing on developing its aerospace industry, and assembly of helicopter and regional jet aircraft fuselages is underway. Foreign firms such as MD Helicopters, Bell, Cessna and Bombardier build helicopter, aircraft and regional jets fuselages in Mexico. Although the Mexican aircraft industry is mostly foreign, as is its car industry, Mexican firms have been founded such as Aeromarmi, which builds light propeller airplanes, and Hydra Technologies, which creates Unmanned Aerial Vehicles such as the S4 Ehécatl, other important companies are Frisa Aerospace that manufactures jet engine parts for the new Mitsubishi Regional jet and supplies Prat&whittney and Rolls-Royce jet engine manufacturers of casings for jet engines and Kuo Aerospace that builds parts for aircraft landing gear and Supplies bombardier plant in Querétaro.

Compared with the United States or Western European countries, a larger share of Mexico's industrial economy is food manufacturing, which includes several world-class companies, but the regional industry remains underdeveloped. Some national brands have become international and local Mom-and-Pop producers, with little manufacturing in between.

==== Electronics ====
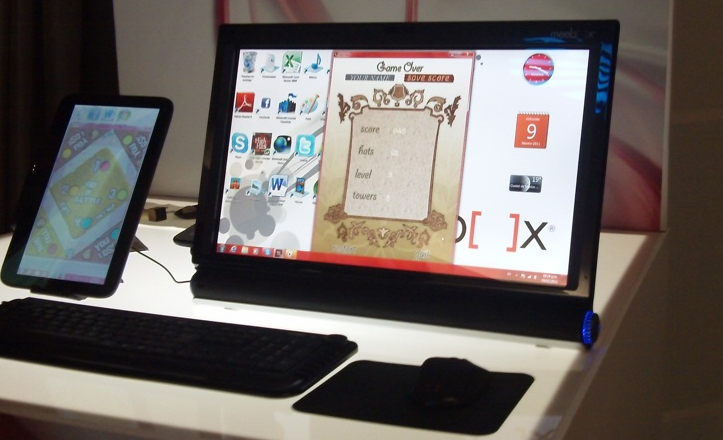
A tablet PC and touch screen computer / television made by Mexican Meebox

Mexico's electronics industry has grown enormously within the last decade. Mexico has the sixth-largest electronics industry in the world, after China, United States, Japan, South Korea, and Taiwan. Mexico is the second-largest exporter of electronics to the United States, exporting $71.4 billion worth of electronics in 2011. The Mexican electronics industry is dominated by the manufacture and OEM design of televisions, displays, computers, mobile phones, circuit boards, semiconductors, electronic appliances, communications equipment and LCD modules. The Mexican electronics industry grew 20% between 2010 and 2011, up from a constant 17% growth rate between 2003 and 2009. Electronics represent 30% of Mexico's exports.

===== Televisions =====
The design and manufacture of flat-panel plasma, LCD, and LED televisions is the single largest sector of Mexico's electronics industry, accounting for 25% of Mexico's electronics export revenue. In 2009, Mexico surpassed South Korea and China as the largest manufacturer of televisions, with Sony, Toshiba, Samsung, Sharp (through Semex), Zenith LG, Lanix, TCL, RCA, Phillips, Elcoteq, Tatung, Panasonic, and Vizio manufacturing CRT, LCD, LED and Plasma televisions in Mexico. Due to Mexico's position as the world's largest television manufacturer, it is known as the television capital of the electronics industry.

===== Computers =====
Mexico is the third largest manufacturers of computers in the world with both domestic companies such as Lanix, Texa, Meebox, Spaceit, Kyoto and foreign companies such as Dell, Sony, HP, Acer Compaq, Samsung and Lenovo manufacturing various types of computers across the country. Most of the computers manufactured in Mexico are from foreign companies. Mexico is Latin America's largest producer of electronics and appliances made by domestic companies.

===== OEM and ODM manufacturing =====
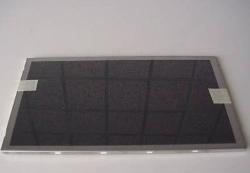
A Lanix LT10.1 high definition LCD assembled under OEM contract by Lanix for use in a Sharp LCD television.

Mexico is also home to many OEM and ODM manufacturers, both foreign and domestic. Among them include Foxconn, Celestica, Sanmina-SCI, Jabil, Elcoteq, Falco, Kimball International, Compal, Benchmark Electronics, Plexus, Lanix and Flextronics. These companies assemble finished electronics or design and manufacture electronic components on behalf of larger companies such as Sony or Microsoft using locally sourced components, for example the ODM, Flextronics manufactures Xbox video games systems in Guadalajara, Mexico for Microsoft using components such as power systems and printed circuit boards from a local company, Falco Electronics which acts as the OEM.

===== Engineering and design =====
The success and rapid growth of the Mexican electronics sector are driven primarily by the relatively low cost of manufacturing and design in Mexico, its strategic position as a major consumer electronics market coupled with its proximity to both the large North American and South American markets, whom Mexico shares free trade agreements with; government support in the form of low business taxes, simplified access to loans and capital for both foreign multinational and domestic startup tech-based firms; and a very large pool of highly skilled, educated labor across all sectors of the tech industry. For example, German multinational engineering and electronics conglomerate Siemens has a significant Mexican base, which also serves as its business and strategy hub for Central American countries and the Caribbean region.

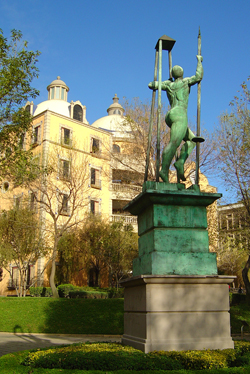
The Monterrey Institute of Technology and Higher Education is one of Mexico's most prestigious technology and engineering universities and is ranked one of the leading engineering institutions in Latin America.

There are almost half a million (451,000) students enrolled in electronics engineering programs with an additional 114,000 electronics engineers entering the Mexican workforce each year and Mexico had over half a million (580,000) certified electronic engineering professionals employed in 2007. From the late 1990s, the Mexican electronics industry began to shift away from simple line assembly to more advanced work such as research, design, and the manufacture of advanced electronics systems such as LCD panels, semiconductors, printed circuit boards, microelectronics, microprocessors, chipsets and heavy electronic industrial equipment and in 2006 the number of certified engineers being graduated annually in Mexico surpassed that of the United States. Many Korean, Japanese and American appliances sold in the US are actually of Mexican design and origin but sold under the OEM's client names. In 2008 one out of every four consumer appliances sold in the United States was of Mexican design.

===== Joint production =====
While many foreign companies, such as Phillips, Vizio and LG, install wholly owned factories in Mexico, several foreign companies have set up semi-independent joint-venture companies with Mexican businesses to manufacture and design components in Mexico. These companies are independently operated from their foreign parent companies and are registered in Mexico. These local companies function under Mexican law and retain a sizable portion of the revenue. These companies typically function as both in-house OEM development and design facilities and manufacturing centers, and usually produce most of the components needed to manufacture the finished products. An example would by Sharp which has formed Semex.

Semex was founded as a joint venture between Sharp and Mexican investors, and acts as an autonomous, independent company that Sharp maintains only partial control over. The company manufactures whole products, such as televisions, and designs individual components on behalf of Sharp, such as LCD modules, and, in return, Semex is granted access to Sharp's capital, technology, research capacity, and branding. Notable foreign companies which have set up joint venture entities in Mexico include Samsung which formed Semex, a local designer and manufacturer of finished televisions, white goods and individual electronic components like printed circuit boards, LCD panels and semiconductors, Toshiba, who formed Toshiba de México, S.A. de C.V., an administratively autonomous subsidiary which produces electronics parts, televisions and heavy industrial equipment.

Some of these subsidiaries have expanded into multiple branches, effectively becoming autonomous conglomerates within their parent companies. Sony for example started operations in Mexico in 1976 with a group of Mexican investors, and founded the joint venture, Sony de Mexico which produces LED panels, LCD modules, automotive electronics, appliances and printed circuit boards amongst other products for its Japanese parent company, Sony KG. Sony de Mexico has research facilities in Monterrey and Mexico City, designs many of the Sony products manufactured in Mexico, and has now expanded to create its own finance, music, and entertainment subsidiaries, which are Mexican-registered and independent of their Japanese parent corporation.

===== Domestic industry =====
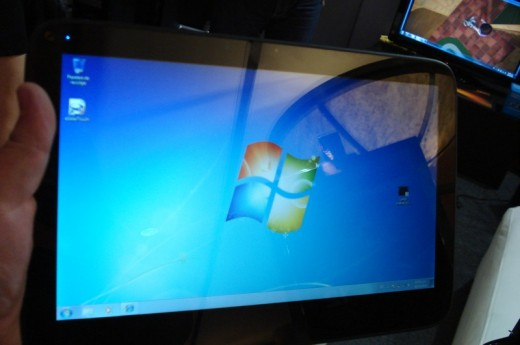
Lanix W10 Ilium tablet PC.

Although much of Mexico's electronics industry is driven by foreign companies, Mexico also has a sizeable domestic electronics industry and a number of electronics companies including Mabe, a major appliance manufacturer and OEM which has been functioning since the nineteen fifties and has expanded into the global market, Meebox, a designer and manufacturer desktop and tablet computers, solar power panels and electronics components, Texa, which manufactures computers laptops and servers, Falco, a major international manufacturer of electronic components such as printed circuitboards, power systems, semiconductors, gate drives and which has production facilities in Mexico, India and China, and Lanix, Mexico's largest electronics company which manufactures products such as computers, laptops, smartphones, LED and LCDs, flash memory, tablets, servers, hard drives, RAM, optical disk drives, and printed circuitboards and employs over 11,000 people in Mexico and Chile and distributes its products throughout Latin America. Another area being currently developed in Mexico is Robotics, Mexico's new Mexone robot has been designed with the idea that in future years develop a commercial application for such advanced robots

==== Oil ====
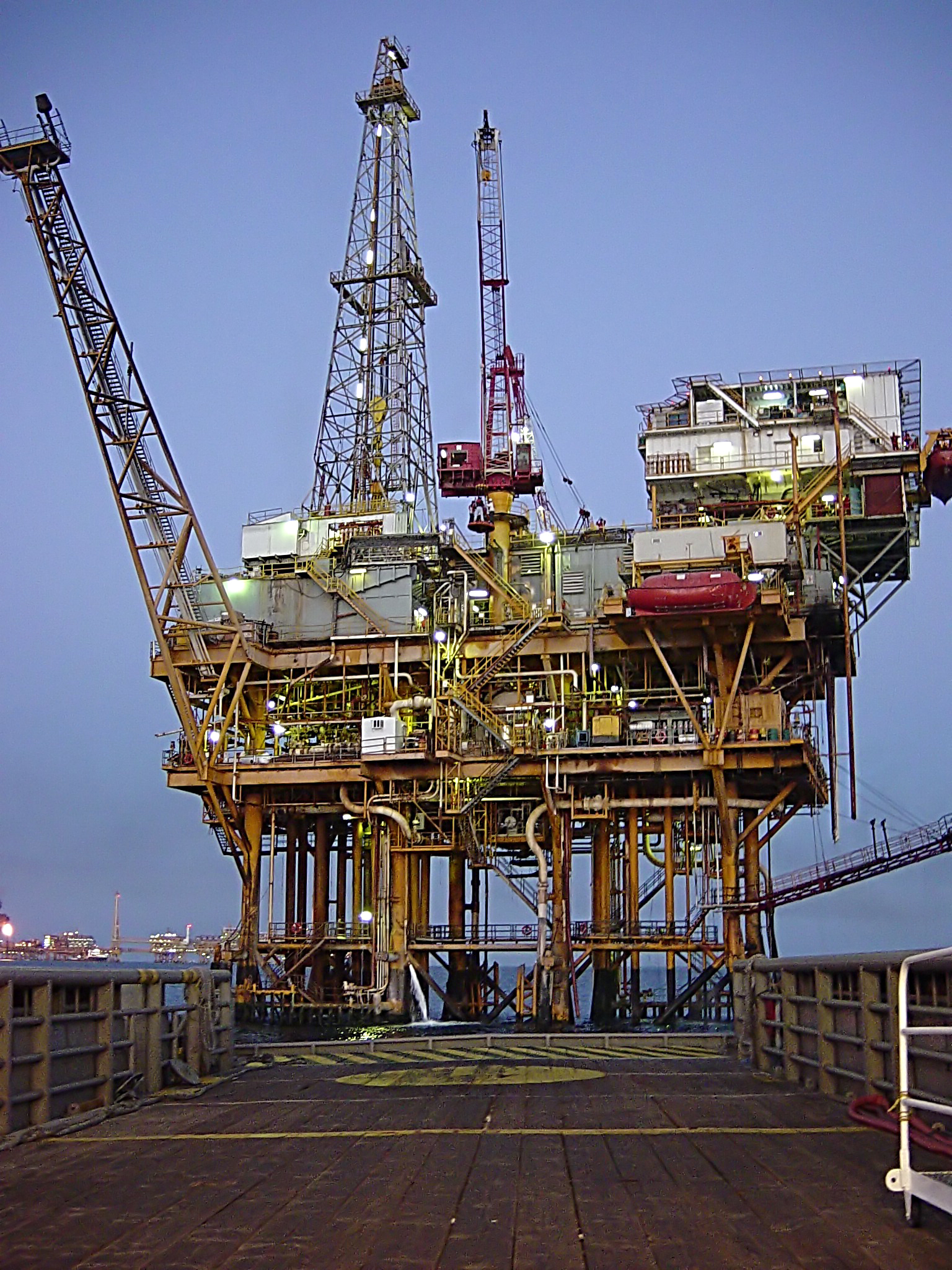
A Pemex offshore oil platform just off the coast of Ciudad del Carmen.

Energy resources are public property under the Constitution. As such, the energy sector is administered by the government with varying degrees of private investment. Mexico is the fourteenth-largest oil producer in the world, with 1,710,303 barrels per day (271,916.4 m^{3}/d). Mexico is a member of the OPEC+ cartel. Pemex, the state-owned company in charge of administering research, exploration and sales of oil, is the largest company in Mexico, and the second largest in Latin America after Brazil's Petrobras. Pemex is heavily taxed of almost 62 per cent of the company's sales, a significant source of revenue for the government.

Without enough money to continue investing in finding new sources or upgrading infrastructure, and being protected constitutionally from private and foreign investment, some have predicted the company may face institutional collapse. While the oil industry is still relevant for the government's budget, its importance in GDP and exports has steadily fallen since the 1980s. In 1980 oil exports accounted for 61.6% of total exports; by 2000 it was only 7.3%.

==== Manufacturing ====
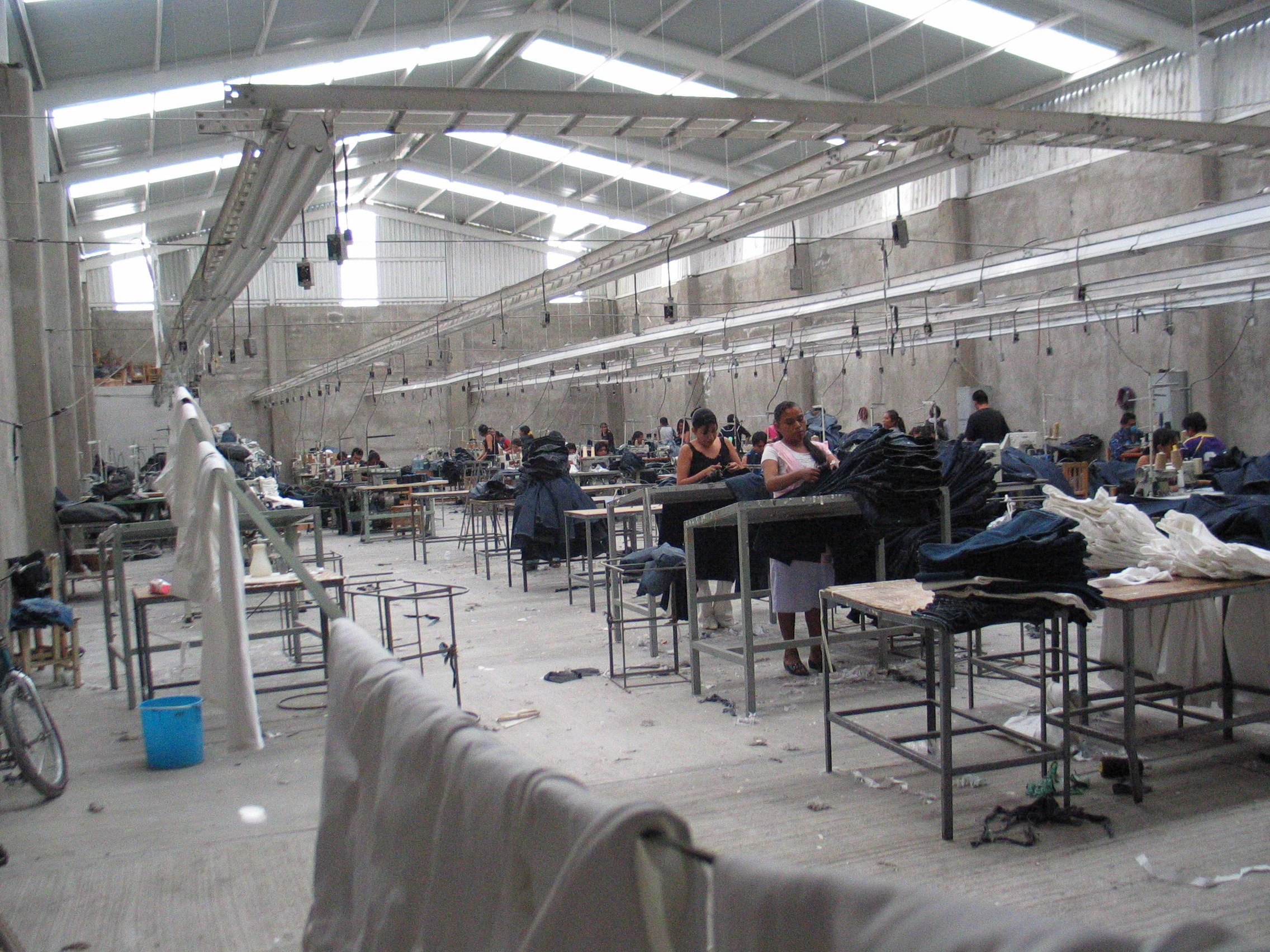
A maquiladora assembly plant in Mexico.

Manufacturing in Mexico grew rapidly in the late 1960s with the end of the US farm labor agreement known as the bracero program. This sent many farm laborers back into the Northern border region with no source of income. As a result, the US and Mexican governments agreed to The Border Industrialization Program, which permitted US companies to assemble products in Mexico using raw materials and components from the US with reduced duties. The Border Industrialization Program became known popularly as the Maquiladora Program, or shortened to the Maquila Program.

Over the years, simple assembly operations in Mexico have evolved into complex manufacturing operations, including televisions, automobiles, industrial, and personal products. While inexpensive commodity manufacturing has flown to China, Mexico attracts U.S. manufacturers that need low-cost solutions nearby for higher-value end products and just-in-time components.

===== Automotive =====
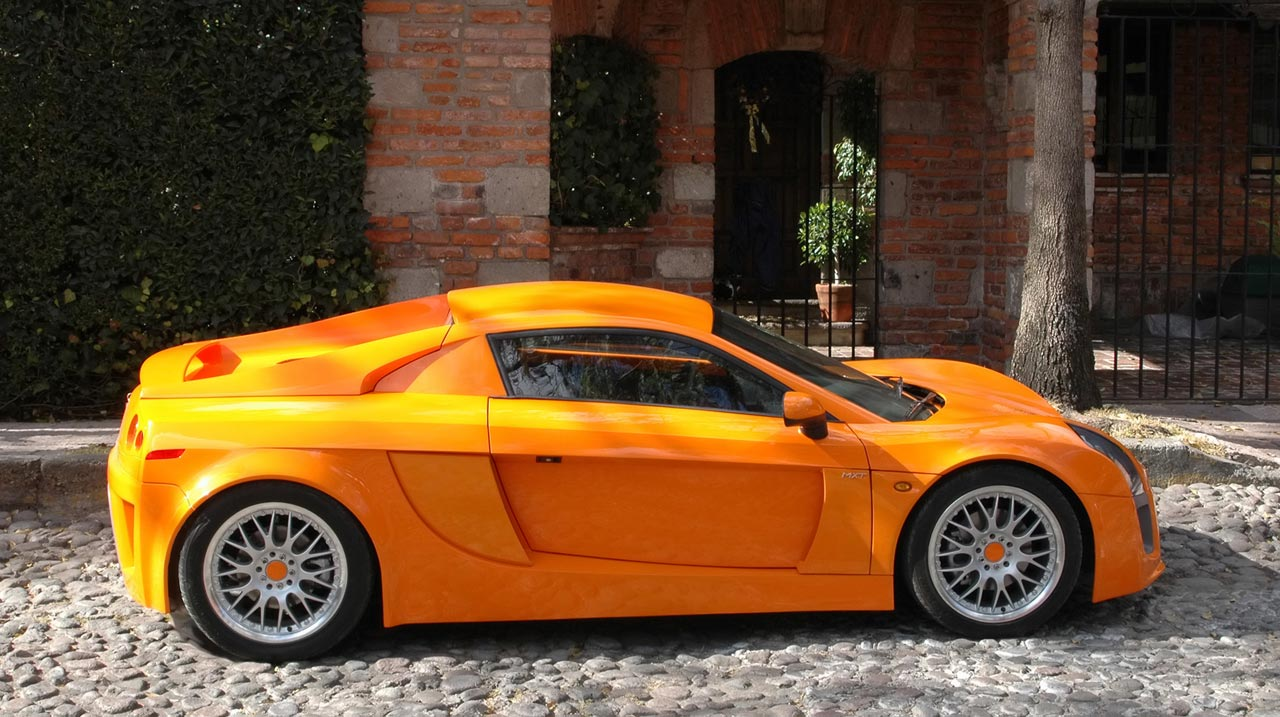
Mastretta-MXT-lg a lightweight and agile two-seat sports car, notable for its sleek design and performance capabilities.

The automotive sector accounts for 17.6% of Mexico's manufacturing sector. General Motors, Chrysler, Ford, Nissan, Fiat, Renault, Honda, Toyota, and Volkswagen produce 2.8 million vehicles annually at 20 plants across the country, mostly in Puebla. Mexico manufactures more automobiles of any North American nation. The industry produces technologically complex components and engages in research and development.

The "Big Three" (General Motors, Ford and Chrysler) have been operating in Mexico since the 1930s, while Volkswagen and Nissan built their plants in the 1960s. In Puebla 70 industrial part-makers cluster around Volkswagen. In the 2010s expansion of the sector was surging. In 2014, more than $10 billion in investment was committed in the first few months of the year. In August 2014, Kia announced plans for a $1 billion factory in Nuevo León. At the time, Mercedes-Benz and Nissan were already building a $1.4 billion plant near Aguascalientes, while BMW was planning a $1-billion assembly plant in San Luis Potosí. Additionally, Audi began building a $1.3 billion factory in San José Chiapa, near Puebla, in 2013.

=== Services ===
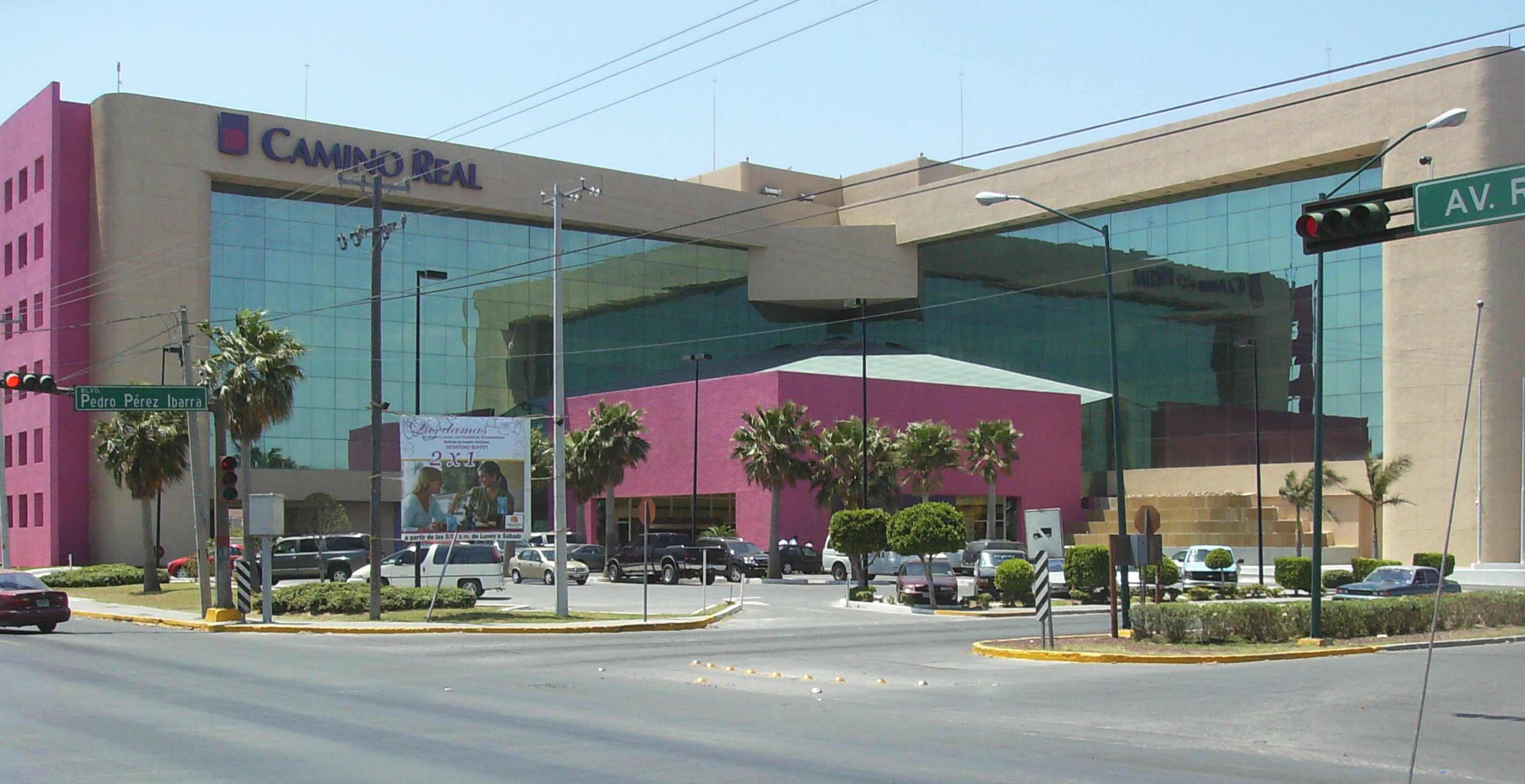
Camino Real Hotels

In 2013, the tertiary sector was estimated to account for 59.8% of Mexico's GDP. In 2011, services employed 61.9% of the working population. This section includes transportation, commerce, warehousing, restaurant and hotels, arts and entertainment, health, education, financial and banking services, telecommunications, as well as public administration and defense. Mexico's service sector is strong, and in 2001, it replaced Brazil's as the largest service sector in Latin America in dollar terms.

==== Retail and hospitality ====
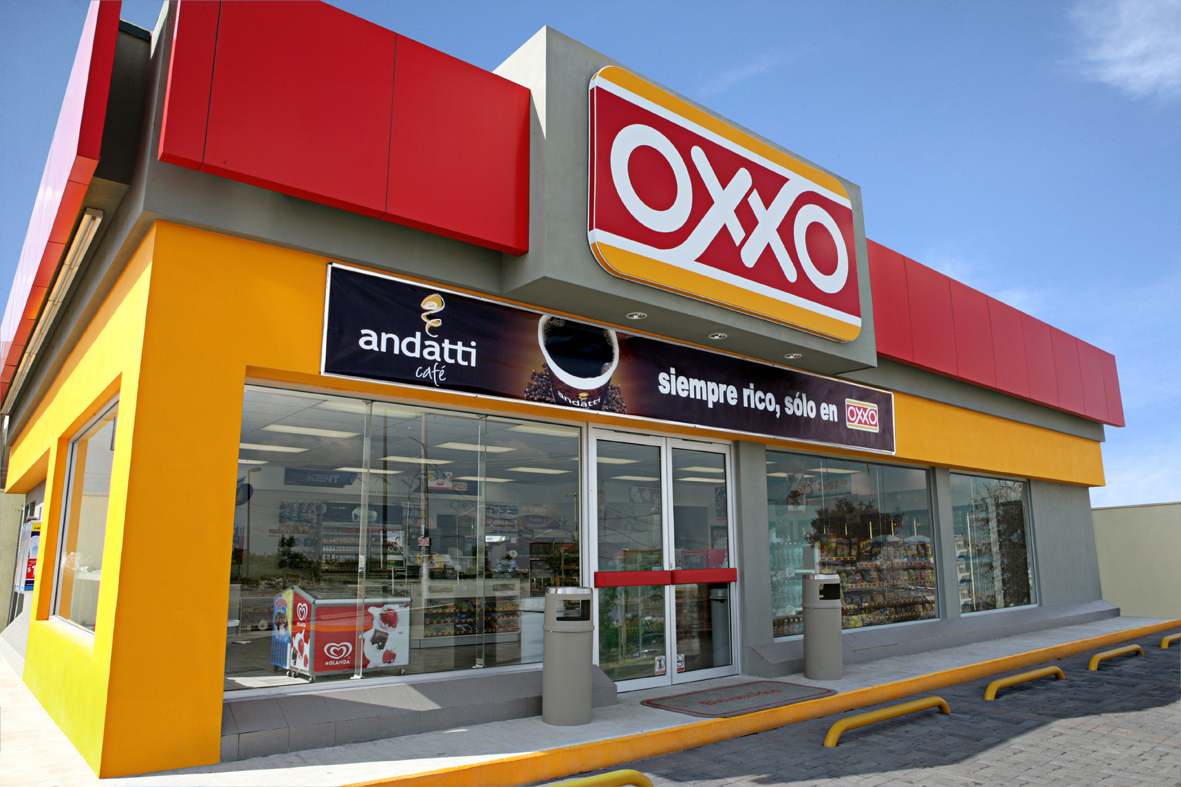
Oxxo store in Cancún

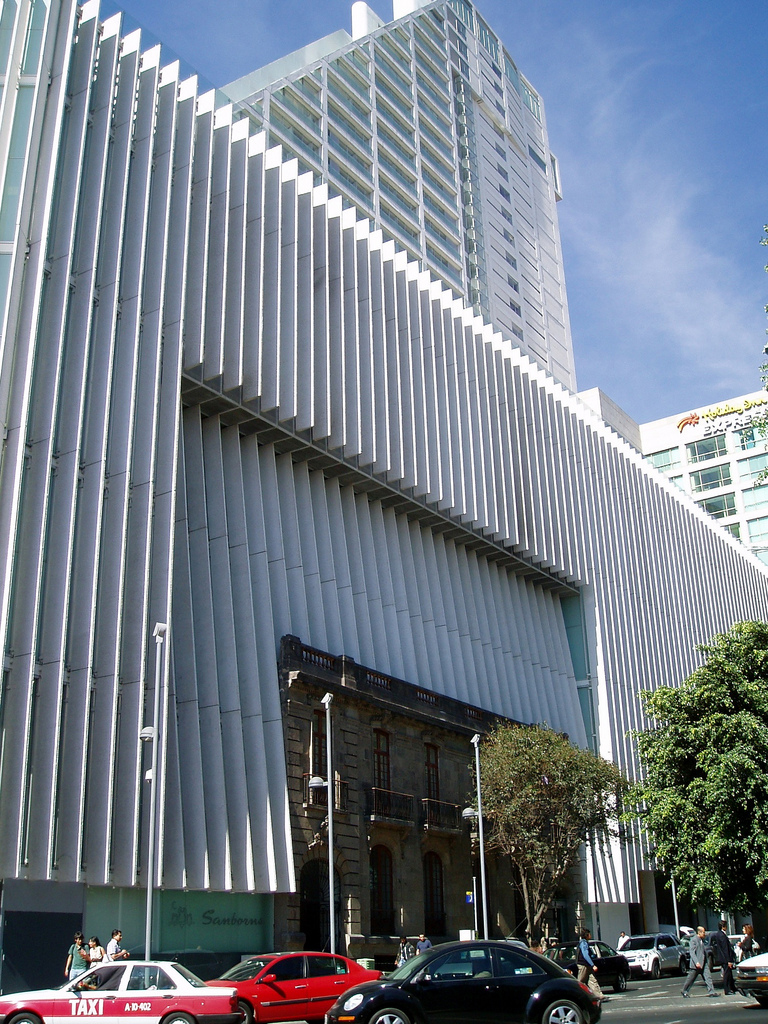
Grupo Sanborns opened in the early 20th century

Mexico has a MXN 4.027 trillion retail sector (2013, about US$300 billion at the 2013 exchange rate) including an estimated US$12 billion (2015) in e-commerce. The largest retailer is Walmart de México, while the largest Mexico-based retailers are Soriana, FEMSA including its Oxxo convenience stores, Coppel (department store), Liverpool department stores, Chedraui, and Comercial Mexicana super/hypermarkets.

==== Tourism ====
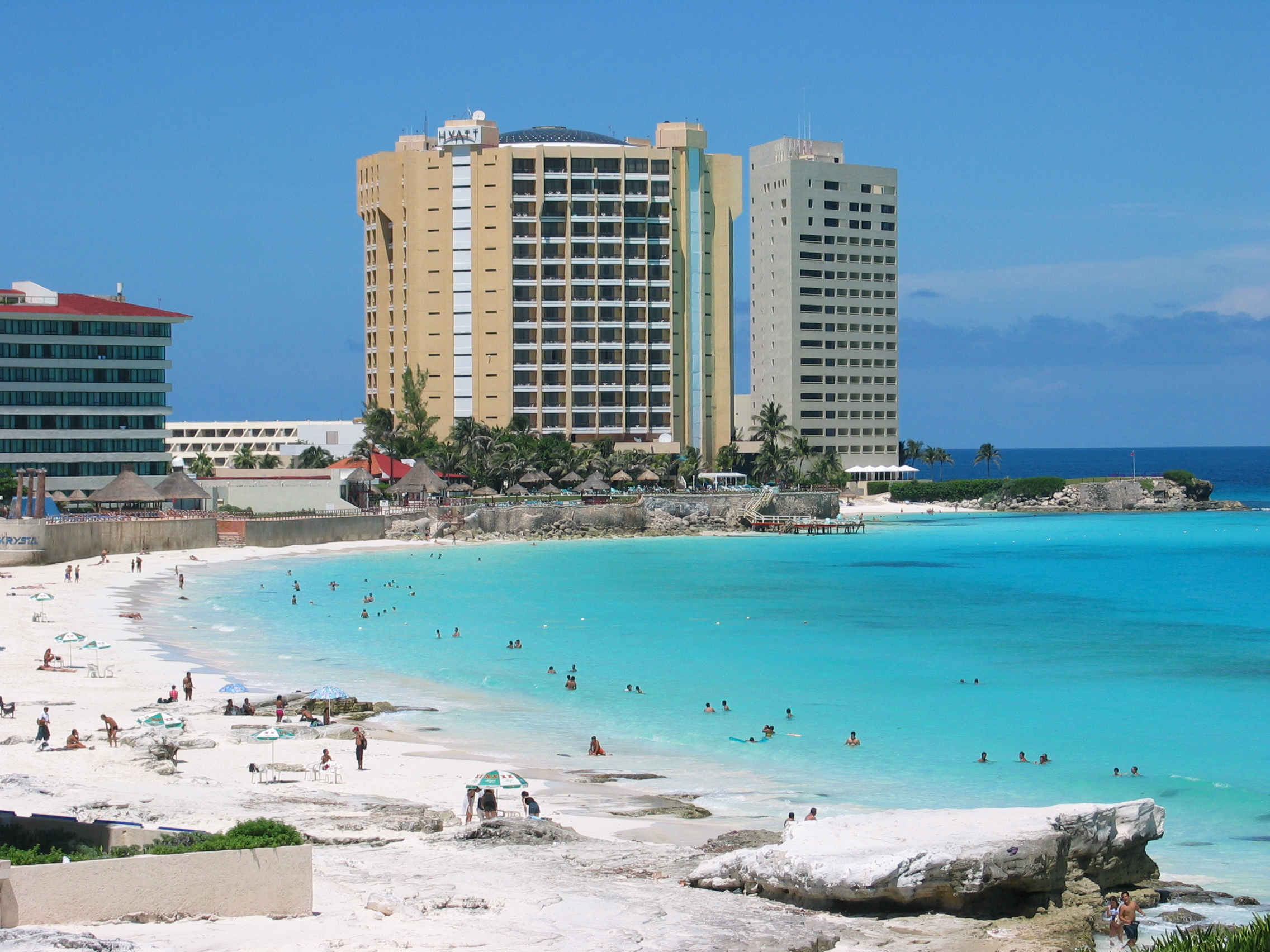
A beach in Cancún

Tourism is one of Mexico's most important industries. It is the fourth largest source of foreign exchange. In 2024, Mexico was the sixth most visited country, with 45 million international arrivals.

==== Finance ====
===== Banking system =====
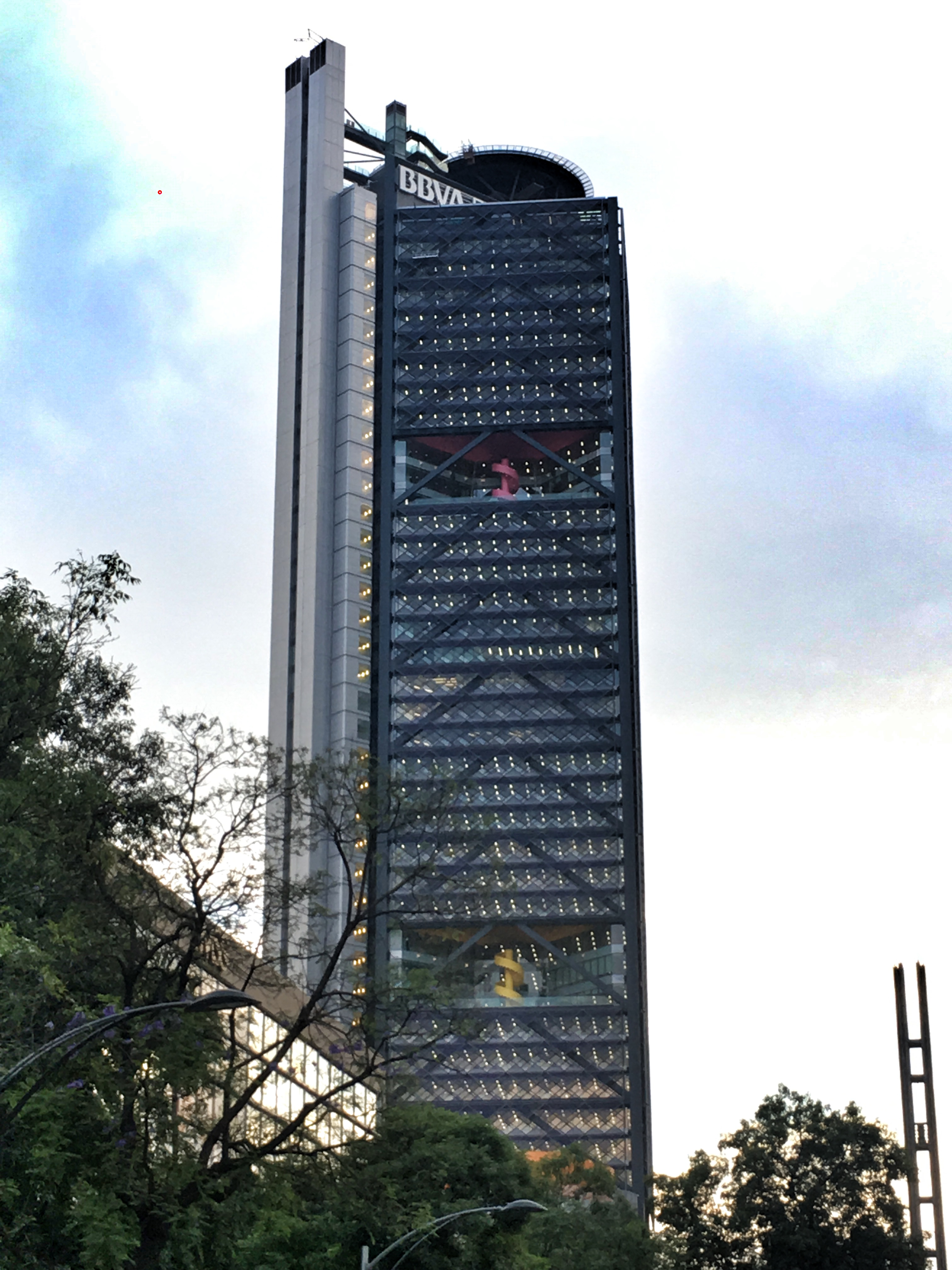
BBVA Bancómer Tower

According to the IMF the Mexican banking system is strong, in which private banks are profitable and well-capitalized. The financial and banking sector is increasingly dominated by foreign companies or mergers of foreign and Mexican companies with the notable exception of Banorte. The acquisition of Banamex, one of the oldest surviving financial institutions in Mexico, by Citigroup was the largest US-Mexico corporate merger, at US$12.5 billion. The largest financial institution in Mexico is Bancomer associated to the Spanish BBVA.

The process of institution-building in Mexico's financial sector has evolved hand in hand with financial liberalization. Ove recent years, there has been a wave of acquisitions by foreign institutions such as US-based Citigroup, Spain's BBVA and the UK's HSBC. Their presence, along with a better regulatory framework, contributed to the recovery of Mexico's banking system from the 1994–95 peso crisis. Lending to the public and private sectors is increasing, as is activity in insurance, leasing, and mortgages. However, bank credit accounts for only 22% of GDP, which is significantly low compared to 70% in Chile. Credit to the Agricultural sector has fallen 45.5% in six years (2001 to 2007), and now represents about 1% of total bank loans. Other important institutions include savings and loans, credit unions (known as "cajas populares"), government development banks, "non-bank banks", bonded warehouses, bonding companies and foreign-exchange firms.

A wave of acquisitions has left Mexico's financial sector in foreign hands. Their foreign-run affiliates compete with independent financial firms operating as commercial banks, brokerage and securities houses, insurance companies, retirement-fund administrators, mutual funds, and leasing companies.

===== Securities market =====
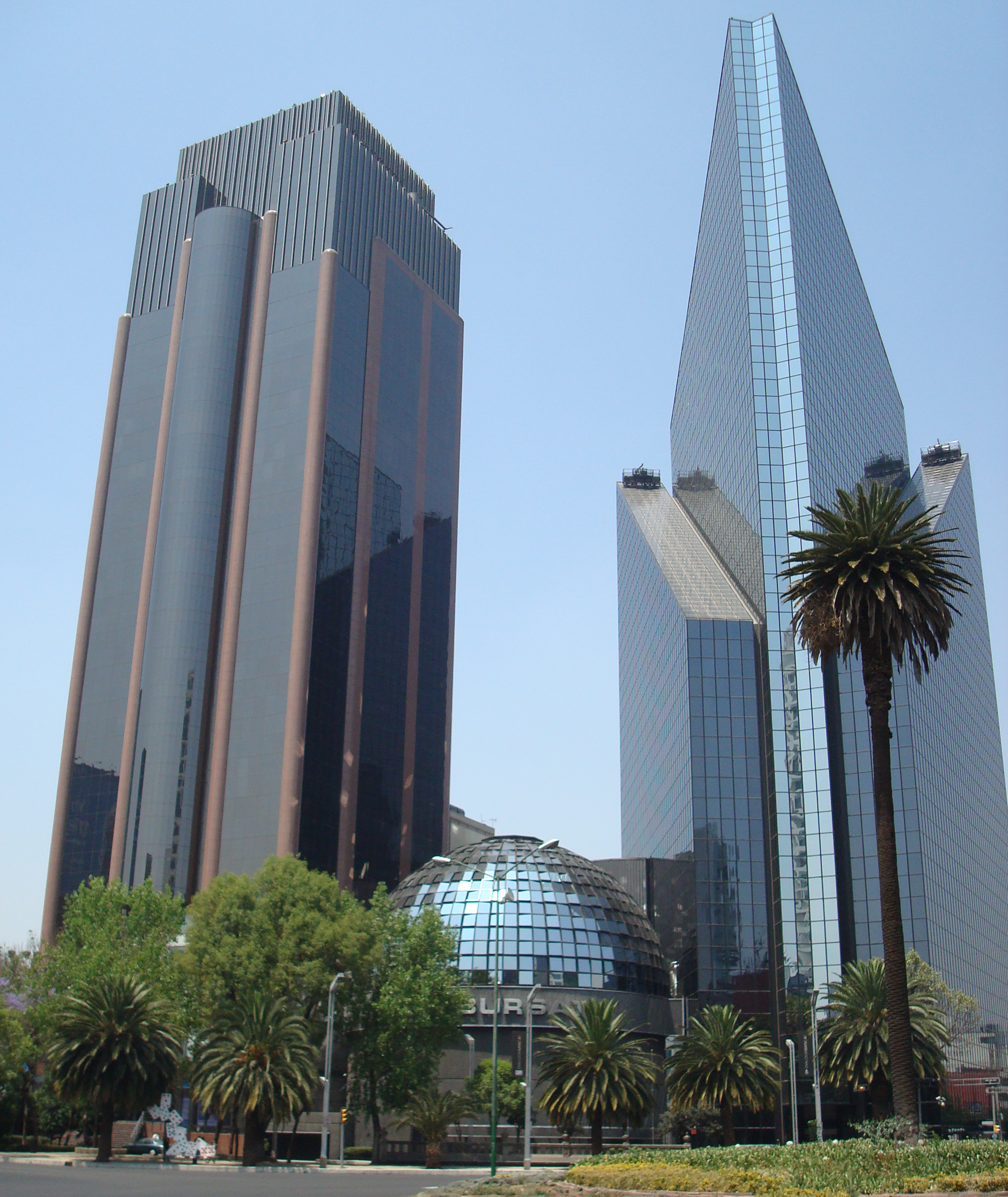
The Mexican Stock Exchange

Mexico has two securities markets, the Mexican Stock Exchange and the Institutional Stock Exchange. The market has grown steadily, with its main indices increasing by more than 600% in the 2000s. The former is Latin America's second-largest exchange, after Brazil's. The total value of the domestic market capitalization of the BMV was calculated at US$409 billion at the end of 2011, and raised to US$451 billion by the end of February this year.

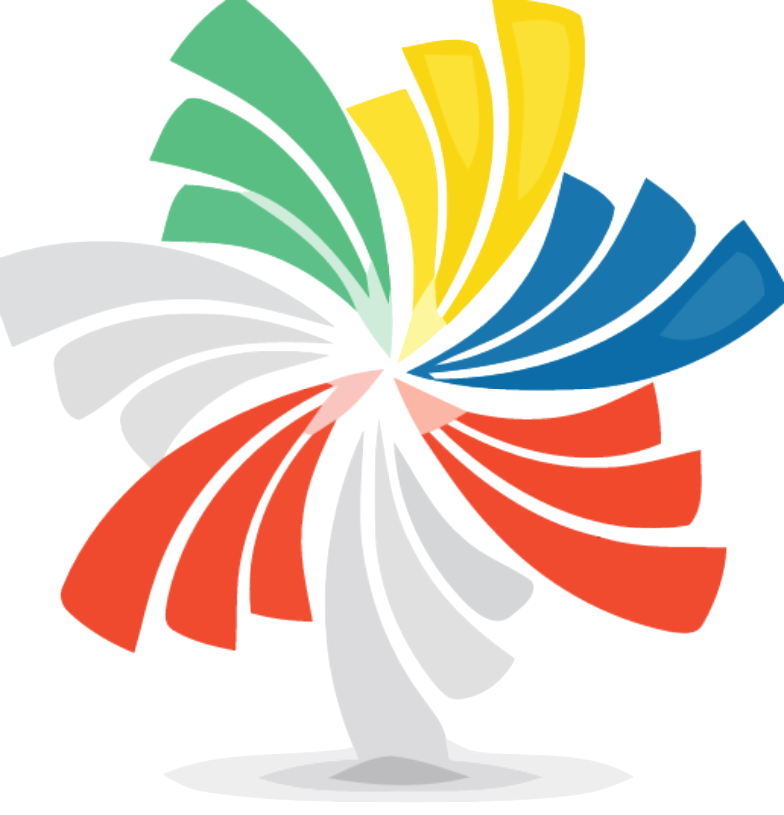
Pacific Alliance-Logo Since 2014, it has been part of the Mercado Integrado Latinoamericano, as part of a unified bag of the Pacific Alliance.

The Indice de Precios y Cotizaciones (IPC) is the benchmark stock index on the Bolsa. In 2005, the IPC surged 37.8%, to 17,802.71 from 12,917.88, backed by a stronger Mexican economy and lower interest rates. It continued its steep rise through the beginning of 2006, reaching 19,272.63 points at the end of March 2006. The stock market also posted a record-low vacancy rate, according to the central bank. Local stock market capitalization totaled US$236bn at end-2005, up from US$170bn at end-2004. As of March 2006, there were 135 listed companies, down from 153 a year earlier. Only a handful of the listed companies are foreign. Most are from Mexico City or Monterrey; companies from these two cities compose 67% of the total listed companies.

The IPC comprises a sample of 35 shares, weighted by market capitalization. The largest companies include America Telecom, the holding company that manages Latin America's largest mobile company, América Móvil; Telmex, Mexico's largest telephone company; Grupo Bimbo, the world's biggest baker; and Wal-Mart de México, a subsidiary of the US retail company. The makeup of the IPC is adjusted every six months, with selection aimed at including the most liquid shares by value, volume, and number of trades.

Mexico's stock market is closely linked to developments in the US. Thus, volatility in the New York and Nasdaq stock exchanges, as well as interest-rate changes and economic expectations in the US, can steer the performance of Mexican equities. This is due both to Mexico's economic dependence on the US and to the high volume of trading in Mexican equities through American Depositary Receipts (ADRs). Currently, the decline in the dollar's value is making non-US markets, including Mexico's, more attractive.

Despite the recent gains, investors remain wary of making placements in second-tier initial public offerings (IPOs). Purchasers of new issues were disappointed after prices fell in numerous medium-sized companies that made offerings in 1996 and 1997. IPO activity in Mexico remains tepid, and the market for second-tier IPOs is barely visible. There were three IPOs in 2005.

==== Education ====
Education in Mexico has a long history. Indigenous peoples in Central Mexico created institutions such as the telpochcalli and the calmecac before the Spanish conquest. The Royal and Pontifical University of Mexico, the second oldest university in the Americas, was founded by royal decree in 1551. Education in Mexico was, until the early twentieth century, largely confined to males from urban and wealthy segments and under the auspices of the Catholic Church.

The Mexican state has been directly involved in education since the nineteenth century, promoting secular education. Control of education was a source of an ongoing conflict between the Mexican state and the Catholic Church, which since the colonial era had exclusive charge of education. The mid-nineteenth-century Liberal Reform separated church and state, which had a direct impact on education. President Benito Juárez sought the expansion of public schools. During the long tenure of President Porfirio Díaz, the expansion of education became a priority under a cabinet-level post held by Justo Sierra; Sierra also served President Francisco I. Madero in the early years of the Mexican Revolution.

The 1917 Constitution strengthened the Mexican state's power in education. During the presidency of Álvaro Obregón in the early 1920s, his Minister of Public Education José Vasconcelos implemented a massive expansion of access to public, secular education and expanded access to secular schooling in rural areas. This work was built on and expanded in the administration of Plutarco Elías Calles by Moisés Sáenz. In the 1930s, the Mexican government under Lázaro Cárdenas mandated socialist education in Mexico and there was considerable push back from the Catholic Church. Socialist education was repealed during the 1940s, with the administration of Manuel Ávila Camacho. A number of private universities have opened since the mid-twentieth century. The Mexican Teachers' Union (SNTE), founded in the late 1940s, has had significant political power. The Mexican federal government has undertaken measures to reform education, which have been opposed by the SNTE.

Education in Mexico is currently regulated by the Secretariat of Public Education (Spanish: Secretaría de Educación Pública) (SEP). Education standards are set by this Ministry at all levels except in "autonomous" universities chartered by the government (e.g., Universidad Nacional Autónoma de México). Accreditation of private schools is accomplished by mandatory approval and registration with this institution. Religious instruction is prohibited in public schools; however, religious associations are free to maintain private schools, which receive no public funds. In the same fashion as other education systems, education has identifiable stages: primary school, junior high school (or "secondary school"), high school, higher education, and postgraduate education.

==== Healthcare ====
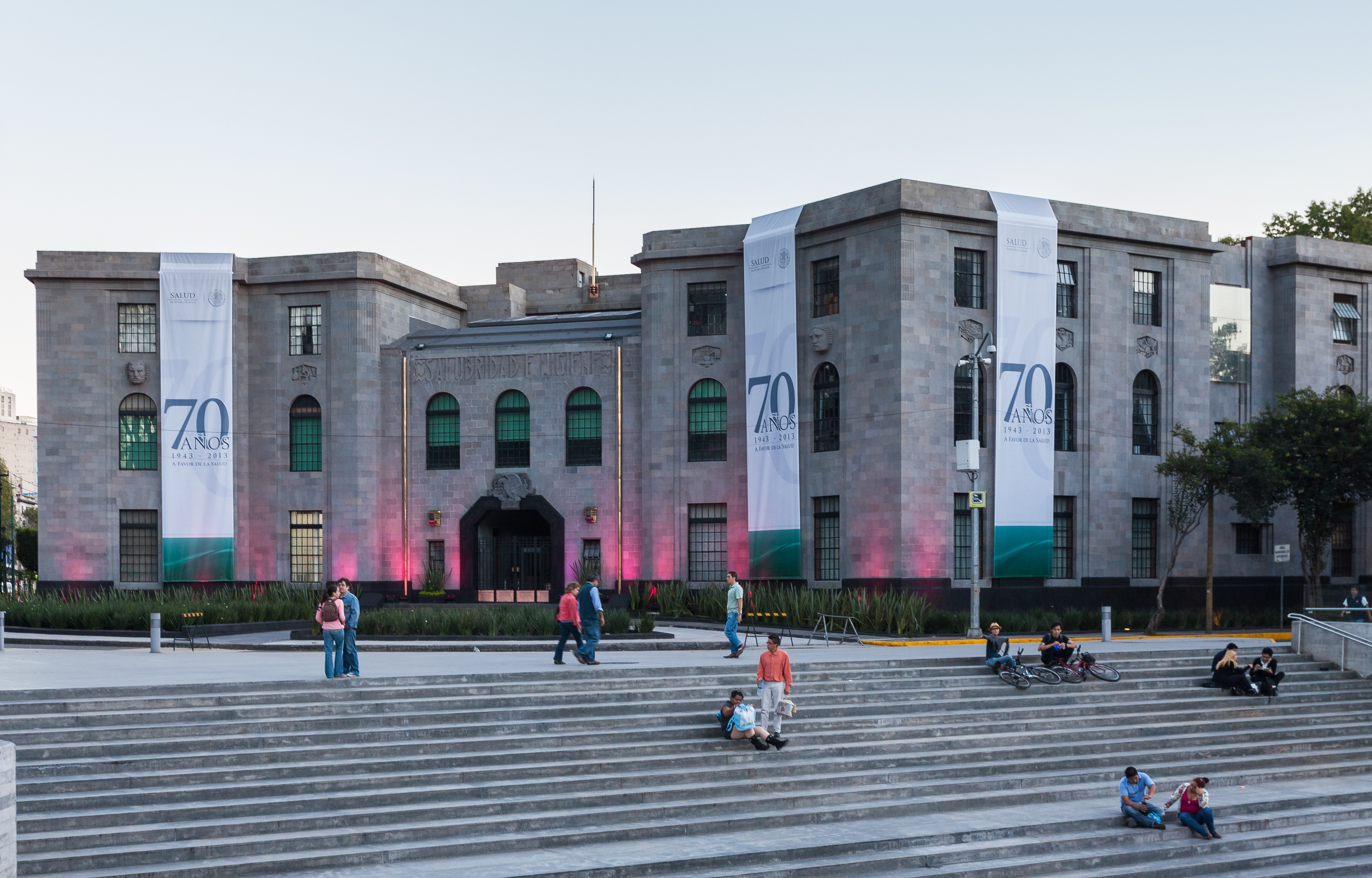
Secretary of Health, Mexico City, Mexico.

Healthcare in Mexico is a multifaceted system comprising public institutions overseen by government departments, private hospitals and clinics, and private physicians. It is distinguished by a unique amalgamation of coverage predominantly contingent upon individuals' employment statuses. Rooted in the Mexican constitution's principles, every Mexican citizen is entitled to cost-free access to healthcare and medication. This constitutional mandate was translated into reality through the auspices of the Instituto de Salud para el Bienestar (English: Institute of Health for Well-being), abbreviated as INSABI; however, INSABI was discontinued in 2023.

The 1917 Mexican Federal Constitution delineates the fundamental principles and structure of the Mexican government, including its obligations to its citizens in various sectors, notably health care. Within its provisions, the Constitution allocates primary responsibility to the state for ensuring the provision of national health services to the populace. The segmentation within the Mexican healthcare system has facilitated the emergence of private organizations and medical practices operated by physicians, thereby offering a diverse array of healthcare options to individuals with the means and inclination to procure such services.

In the realm of epidemiological research focused on Mexico's healthcare landscape, Jorge L. León-Cortés has conducted significant investigations into the historical backdrop of the nation, particularly spanning the years 2012 to 2018. León-Cortés' studies have illuminated a concerning trend characterized by a marked increase in the prevalence of communicable diseases and chronic conditions within the Mexican populace, exerting considerable impact on life expectancies and mortality rates during this period. The structural configuration of the Mexican health system is characterized by ongoing evolution and considerable heterogeneity, manifesting in diverse national health statistics and varying accessibility standards observed across the country.

==== Telecommunications ====
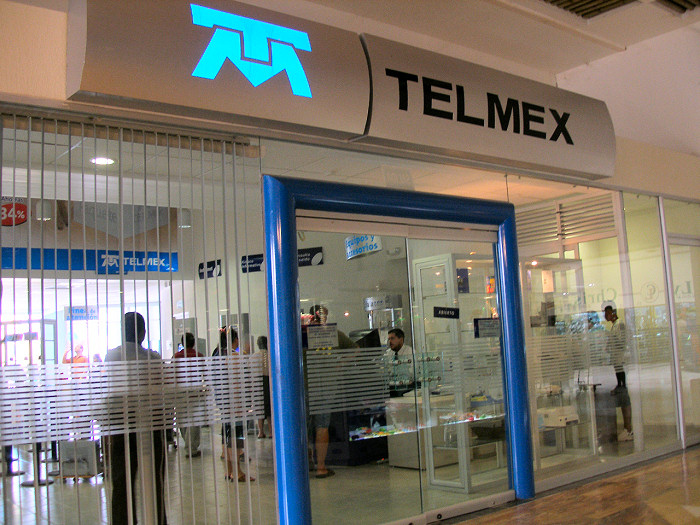
Telmex retail store in Puerto Vallarta

Mass media in Mexico, including telecommunications and digital media, are regulated primarily by the Secretariat of Communications and Transportation (Secretaría de Comunicaciones y Transportes, SCT) and the autonomous Federal Telecommunications Institute (Instituto Federal de Telecomunicaciones, IFT), which replaced the former Federal Commission of Telecommunications (Cofetel) in 2013. Mexico's telecommunications market is among the largest in Latin America and underwent significant liberalization in the 1990s following the privatization of the state-owned monopoly Teléfonos de México (Telmex), acquired by Carlos Slim's América Móvil group in 1990. Despite liberalization, Telmex continued to dominate fixed-line telecommunications and broadband internet access sectors for decades. By 2023, its fixed broadband market share had declined from 51.7% in 2019 to 38.6%, reflecting growing competition from operators like Totalplay, Megacable, and Izzi.

Digital and mobile internet access has accelerated media diversification, with over 90% of users accessing the internet via mobile devices as of 2024. Social media platforms such as Facebook, Twitter, and TikTok have become primary sources of news and political commentary, contributing to media pluralism and facilitating investigative journalism and independent reporting. Nonetheless, challenges persist including political interference, disinformation campaigns, and urban-rural disparities in broadband access. In 2024, the IFT imposed a record fine of ₱1.78 billion pesos on Telcel for monopolistic practices before its powers were transferred to the newly created Agency for Digital Transformation and Telecommunications (ATDT), as part of controversial institutional reforms.

== Infrastructure ==
=== Energy ===
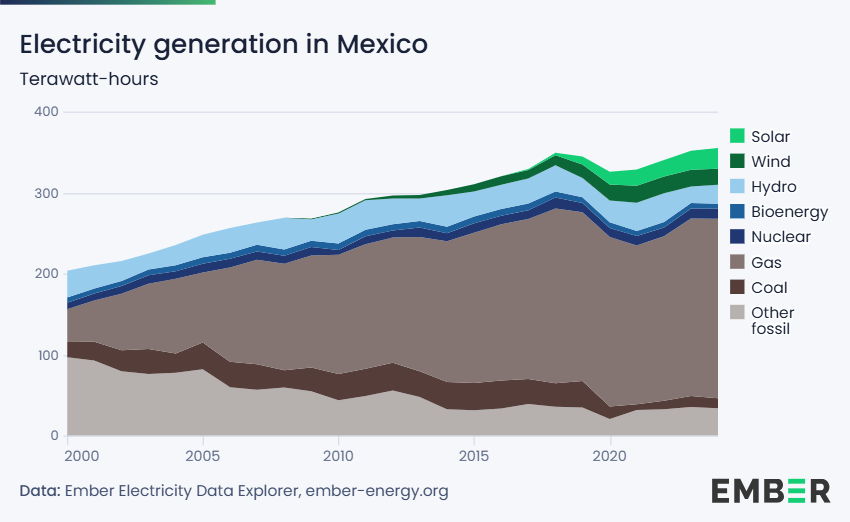
Electricity generation in Mexico in terawatt-hours

Mexico's installed electricity capacity in 2008 was 58 GW. Of the installed capacity, 75% is thermal, 19% hydro, 2% nuclear, and 3% renewable other than hydro. The general trend in thermal generation is a decline in petroleum-based fuels and a growth in natural gas and coal. Since Mexico is a net importer of natural gas, higher levels of natural gas consumption (i.e., for power generation) will likely depend on higher imports from the United States or via liquefied natural gas (LNG).

=== Transportation ===
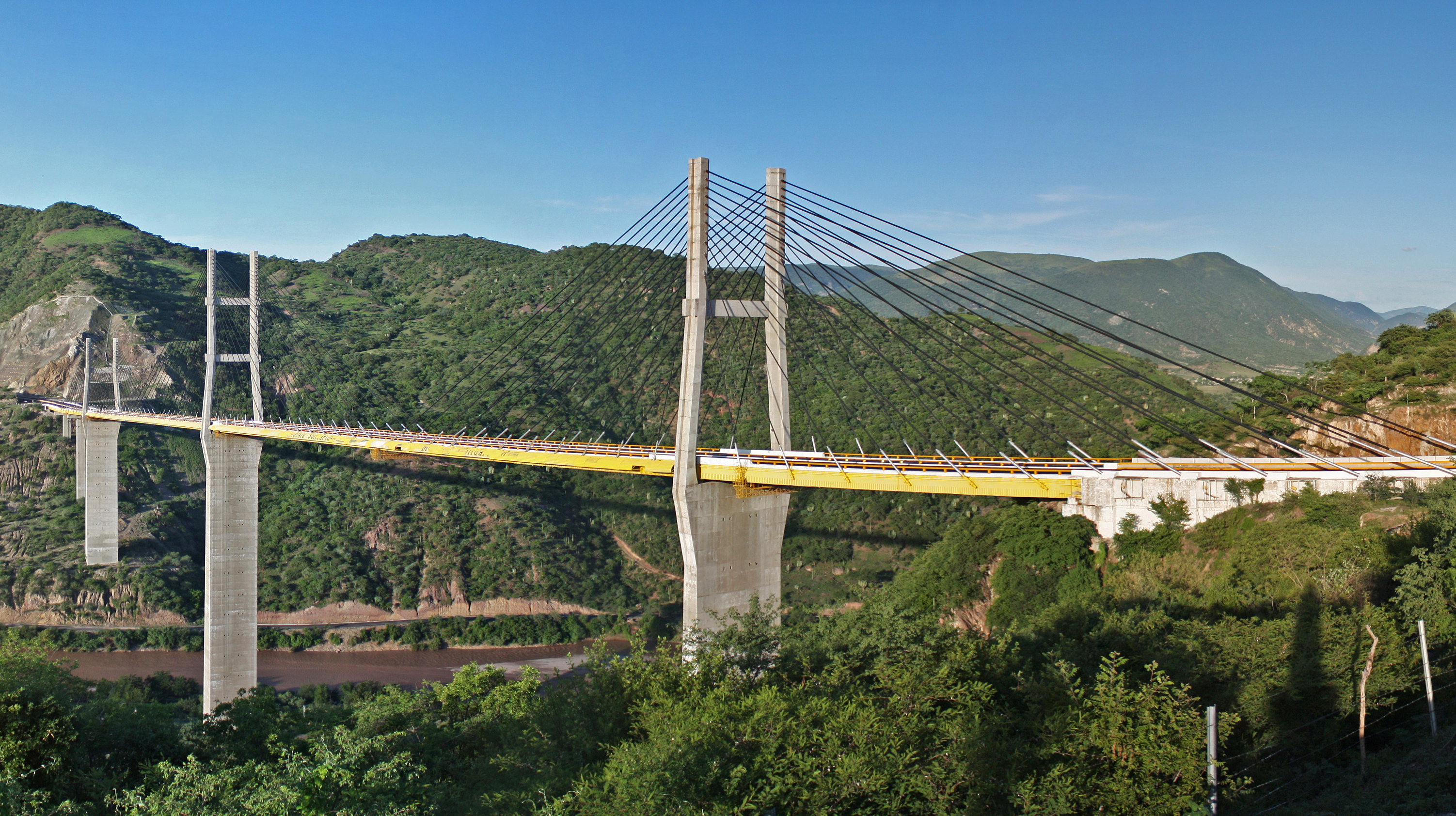
Mezcala Bridge on Highway 95 in Mexico.

As the third largest and second most populous country in Latin America, Mexico has developed an extensive transportation network. Regulated by the Secretariat of Communications and Transportation (Secretaría de Comunicaciones y Transportes, SCT), a federal executive cabinet branch, the system includes modern highways, a well-connected bus network, railways primarily used for freight, and a network of domestic and international airports.

These infrastructures facilitate trade, tourism, and domestic travel, connecting México's diverse regions. However, challenges such as maintenance, traffic congestion, and safety concerns persist, particularly in urban centers, highlighting ongoing efforts to improve and expand the country's transportation capabilities.

=== Water supply and sanitation ===
Water supply and sanitation in Mexico is characterized by achievements and challenges. Among the achievements is a significant increase in access to piped water supply in urban areas (88% to 93%) as well as in rural areas (50% to 74%) between 1990 and 2010. Additionally, a strong nationwide increase in access to improved sanitation (64% to 85%) was observed in the same period. Other achievements include the existence of a functioning national system to finance water and sanitation infrastructure with a National Water Commission as its apex institution; and the existence of a few well-performing utilities such as Aguas y Drenaje de Monterrey.

The challenges include water scarcity in the northern and central parts of the country; inadequate water service quality (drinking water quality; 55% of Mexicans receiving water only intermittently according to results of the 2000 census); poor technical and commercial efficiency of most utilities (with an average level of non-revenue water of 51% in 2003); an insufficient share of wastewater receiving treatment (36% in 2006); and still inadequate access in rural areas. In addition to on-going investments to expand access, the government has embarked on a large investment program to improve wastewater treatment.

== Government ==
=== Monetary and financial system and regulation ===
==== Banco de México ====
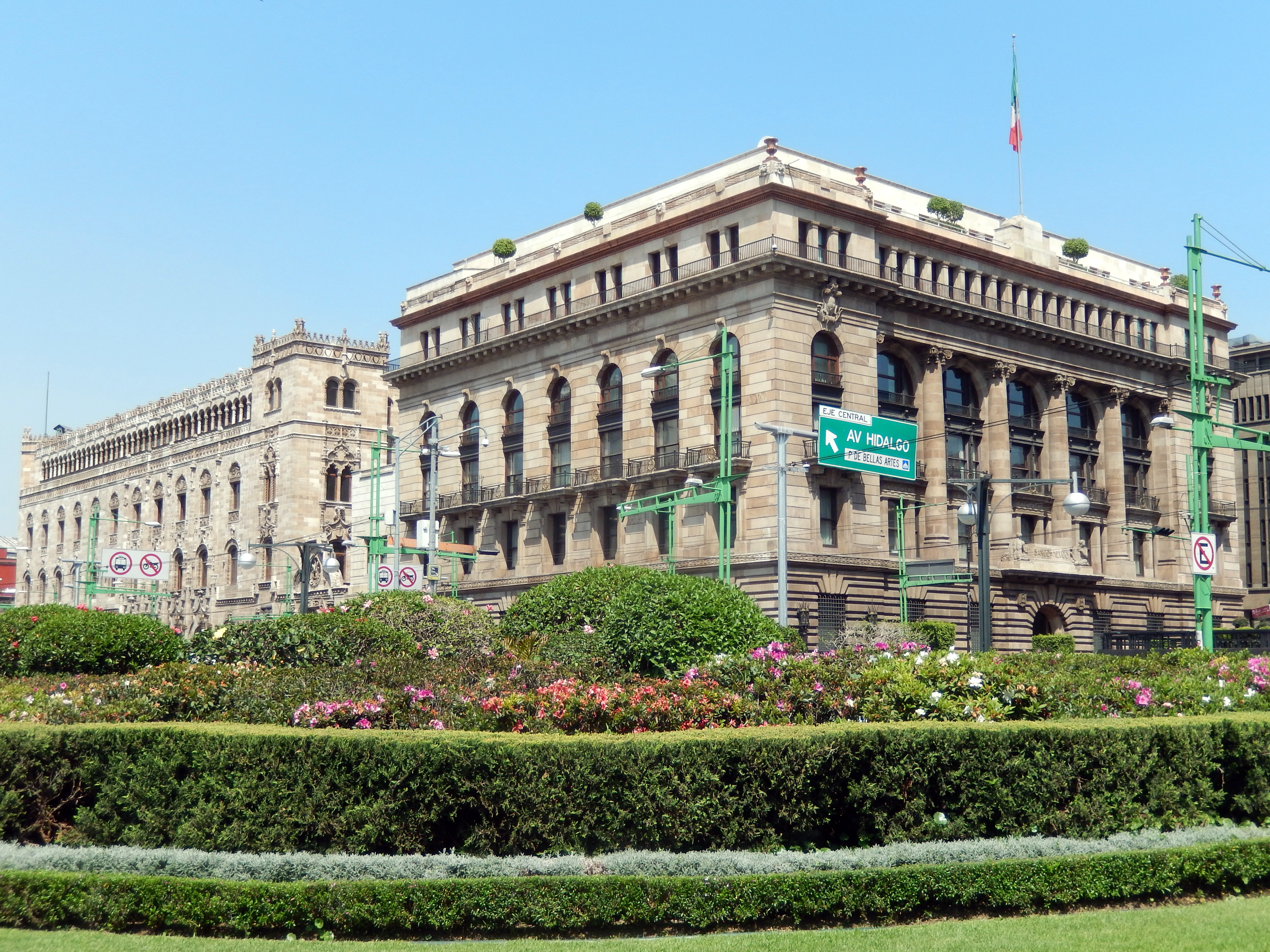
Banco de México headquarters

Financial indicators
| Currency exchange rate | 17.08 MXN per US$1 (February 27, 2024) |
| Reserves | US $214.413 billion (2023) |
| Government budget | US $196.5 billion (revenues) |
| Public debt | 20.7% of GDP (2006) |
| External debt | US $178.3 billion (2006) |
| Bank funding rate | 5.25% (May 15, 2009) |

Banco de México is the national central bank, an internally autonomous public institution whose governor is appointed by the president and approved by the legislature to which it is fully responsible. Banco de México's functions are outlined in the 28th article of the constitution and further expanded in the Monetary Law of the United Mexican States. Banco de México's main objective is to achieve price stability and serve as lender of last resort. It became independent in 1994.

==== Currency policy ====
Mexico has a floating exchange rate regime.

The floating exchange rate originated with reforms initiated after the December 1994 peso crash, which followed unsustainable adherence to a short band. Under the new system, Banco de México no longer commits to the level of the peso exchange rate, although it does employ an automatic mechanism to accumulate foreign reserves. It also offers tools to smooth volatility. The Exchange Rate Commission sets policy; it is composed of six members—three each from the Secretariat of Finance and Public Credit (Secretaría de Hacienda y Crédito Público—SHCP) and the central bank, with the SHCP holding the deciding vote.

In August 1996, Banco de México initiated a mechanism to acquire foreign reserves when the peso was strong, providing the market with signals about a target range for the exchange rate. The resulting high levels of reserves, mostly from petroleum revenues, have helped improve the terms and conditions of Mexico's debt in foreign markets. However, there is concern that the government relies too heavily on oil income to build a healthy reserve base. According to the central bank, international reserves stood at US$75.8 billion in 2007. In May 2003, Banco de México launched a program that sells U.S. dollars via a monthly auction, to maintain a stable, but moderate, level of reserves.

From April 1, 1998, through April 1, 2008, the Peso traded around a peso varying from $46 MXN per US$1.00 on April 21, 1998, to $11.69 MXN per US$1.00 on May 11, 2004, a 10-year peak depreciation of 38.18% between the two reference date extremes before recovering.

After the onset of the US credit crisis that accelerated in October 2008, the Peso had an exchangePesoe during October 1, 2008, through April 1, 2009, fluctuating from lowest to highest between $10.96 MXN per US$1.00 on October 1, 2008, to $15.42 MXN per US$1.00 on March 9, 2009, a peak depreciation ytd of 28.92% during those six months between the two reference date extremes before recovering.

From the $11.69 rate during 2004's low to the $15.42 rate during 2009's low, the peso depreciated by 1% in that span, coinciding with the Iraq War and the Great Recession.

==== Monetary and fiscal system ====
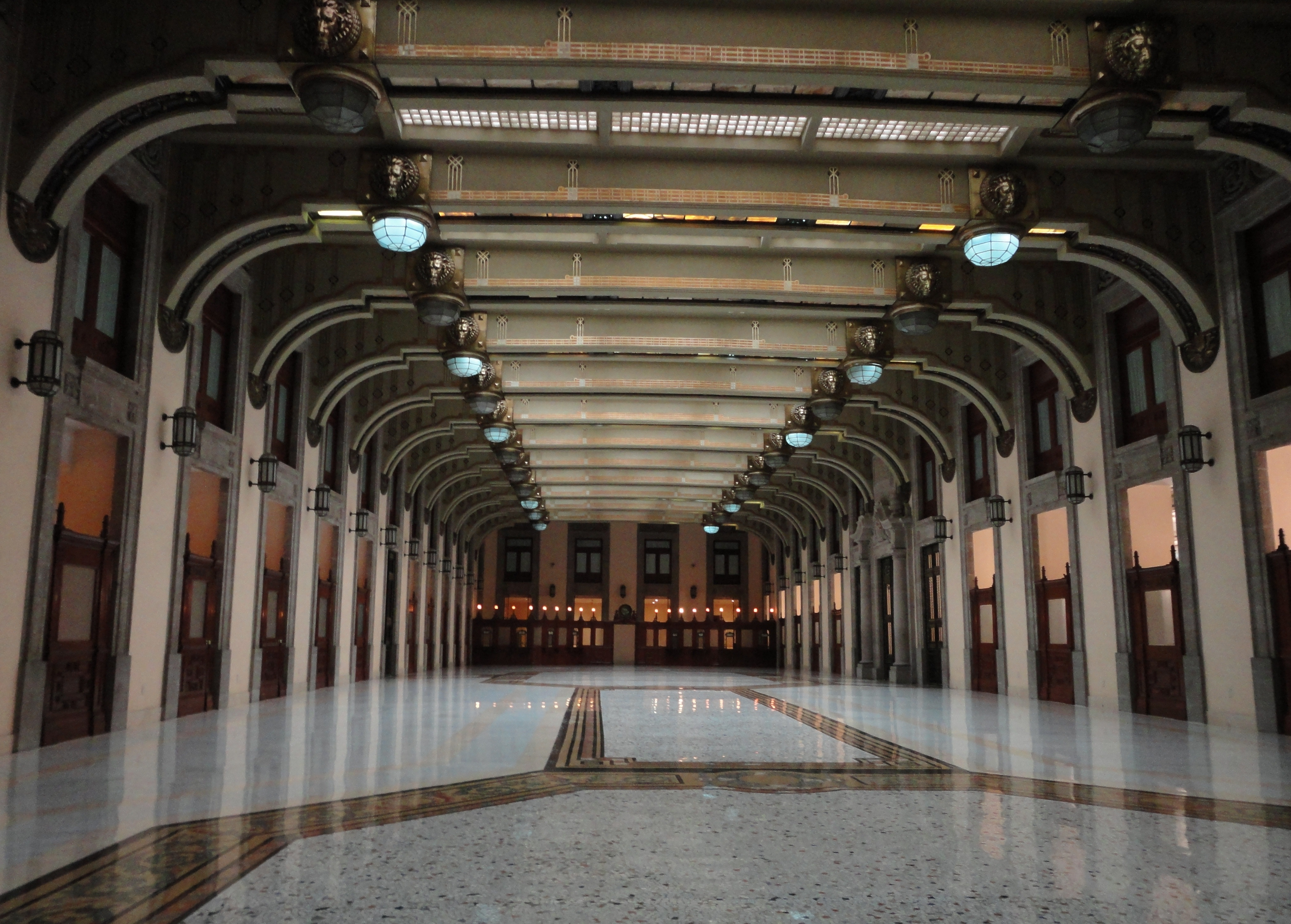
Old hall of the Treasury at the National Palace.

Mexico's monetary policy was revised following the 1994–95 financial crisis, when officials decided that maintaining general price stability was the best way to sustain employment and economic activity. As a result, Banco de México has as its primary objective the maintenance of stability in the purchasing power of the peso. It sets an inflation target, which requires it to establish corresponding quantitative targets for the monetary base and net domestic credit.

The central bank also monitors the evolution of several economic indicators, such as the exchange rate, differences between observed and projected inflation, the results of surveys on the public and specialists' inflation expectations, revisions on collective employment contracts, producer prices, and the balances of the current and capital accounts.

A debate continues over whether Mexico should switch to a US-style interest rate-targeting system. Government officials in favor of a change say that the new system would give them more control over interest rates, which are becoming more important as consumer credit levels rise.

Until 2008, Mexico used a unique system, amongst the OECD countries, to control inflation in a mechanism known as the corto (lit. "shortage") a mechanism that allowed the central bank to influence market interest rates by leaving the banking system short of its daily demand for money by a predetermined amount. If the central bank wanted to push interest rates higher, it increased the corto. If it wished to lower interest rates, it decreased the corto. In April 2004, the Central Bank began setting a referential overnight interest rate as its monetary policy.

=== Business regulation ===
==== Corruption ====
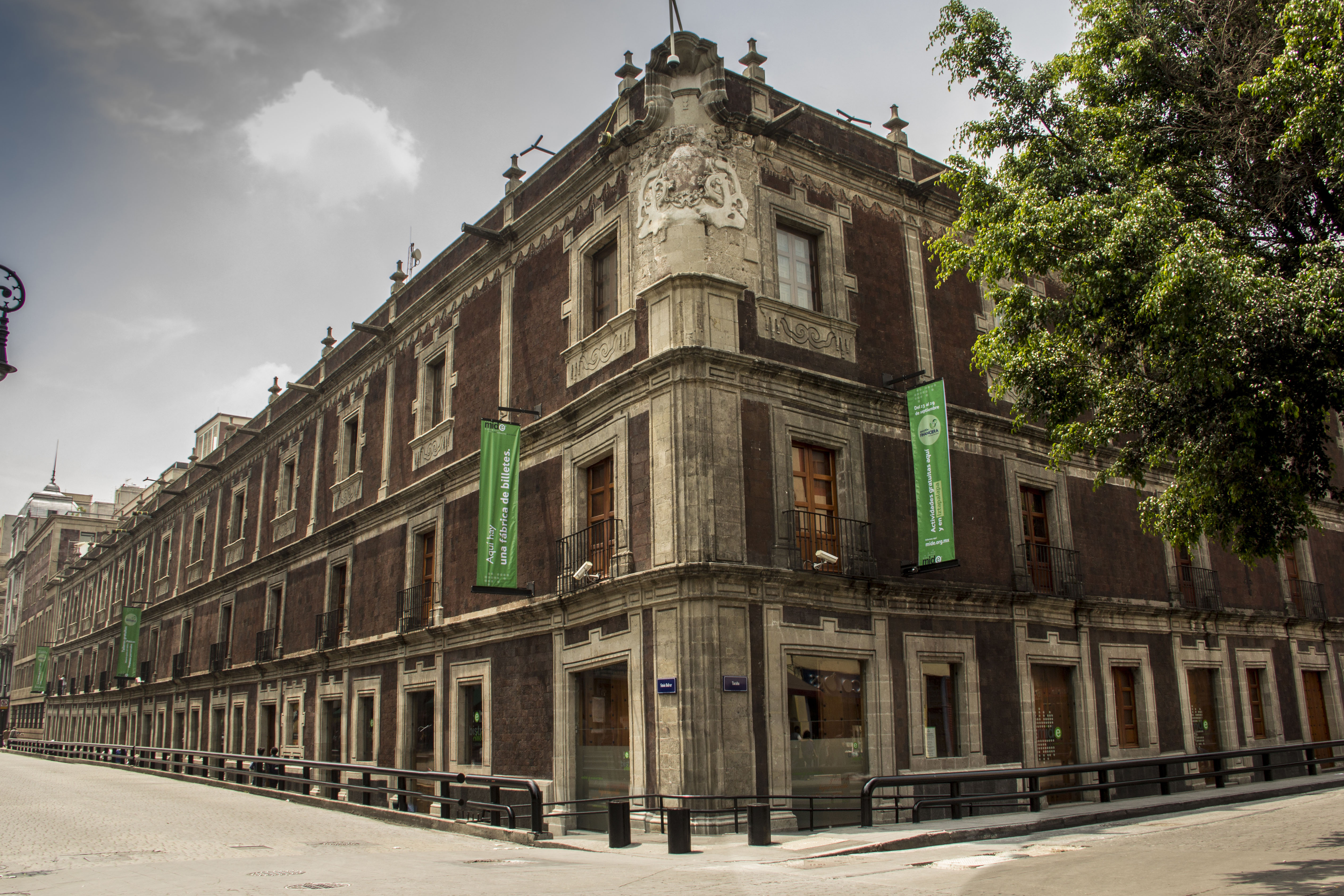
Facade of the former convent and current Interactive Museum of Economics on Tacuba Street

Petty corruption based on exercise of administrative discretion in matters of zoning and business permits is endemic in Mexico adding about 10% to the cost of consumer goods and services. An April 2012 article in The New York Times reporting payment of bribes to officials throughout Mexico to obtain construction permits, information, and other favors resulted in investigations in both the United States and Mexico.

Using relatively recent night-light data and electricity consumption in comparison with Gross County Product, the informal sector of the local economy in Veracruz state is shown to have grown during the Fox Administration, though the regional government remained PRI. The assumption that Mexico's informal economy is a constant 30% of total economic activity is not supported at the local level. The small amount of local spatial autocorrelation found suggests a few clusters of high and low literacy rates among municipios in Veracruz, but not enough to warrant including an I-statistic as a regressor. Global spatial autocorrelation is found especially in literacy at the macro-regional level, which is an area for further research beyond this study.

Improved literacy bolsters both the informal and formal economies in Veracruz, underscoring the importance of policies designed to further literacy for growing the regional economy. While indigenous people are relatively poor, little evidence was found that the informal economy is a higher percentage of total economic activity in a municipio with a high share of indigenous people. While the formal economy might have been expanding relative to the informal economy in 2000, by 2006 this process had been reversed with growing informality. While rural municipios have smaller economies, they are not different than urban municipios in the share of the economy that is informal. Programs in the past that might move economic activity from the informal to the formal sector have not succeeded, suggesting public finance issues such as tax evasion will continue to plague the state with low government revenues.

=== Welfare system ===
Mexico offers social welfare assistance designed to meet needs of the Mexican population, including assistance for low-income populations, women, youth, the elderly, and disabled individuals. Mexico has been offering social welfare since 1999. Despite the fact that Mexico offers welfare to its citizens through various programs, the poverty level in Mexico is currently at 36.3%.

== Trade ==
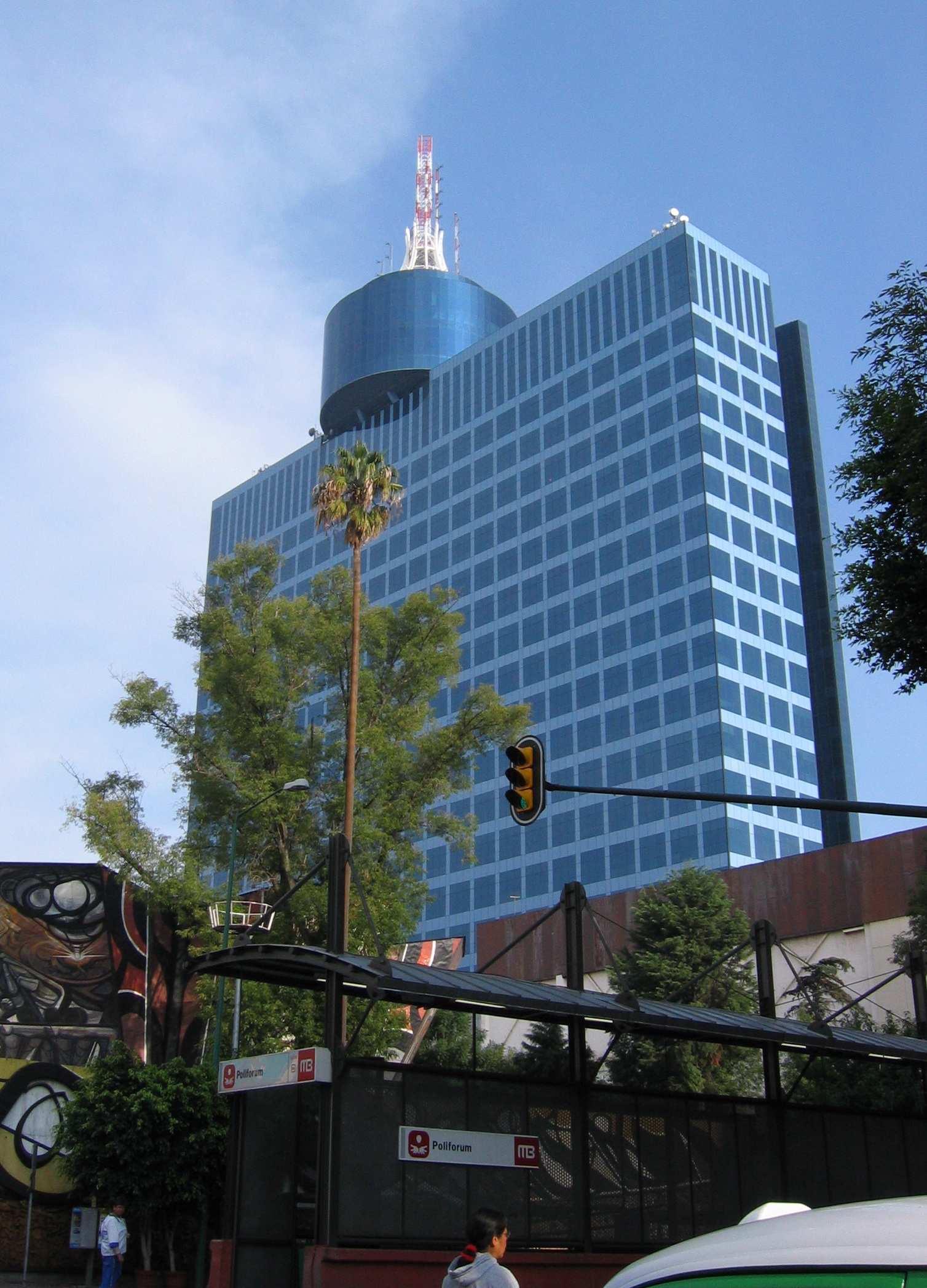
World Trade Center in Mexico City

International trade
| Exports | US $248.8 billion f.o.b. (2006) |
| Imports | US $253.1 billion f.o.b. (2006) |
| Current account | ▼US $400.1 million (2006) |
| Export partners | US 90.9%, Canada 2.2%, Spain 1.4%, Germany 1.3%, Colombia 0.9% (2006) |
| Import partners | US 53.4%, China 8%, Japan 5.9% (2005) |

Mexico is a trade-oriented economy, with imports and exports totaling a 78% share of the GDP in 2019. It is an important trade power as measured by the value of merchandise traded, and the country with the greatest number of free trade agreements. In 2020, Mexico was the world's eleventh largest merchandise exporter and thirteenth largest merchandise importer, representing 2.4% and 2.2% of world trade, respectively (and those rankings increased to 7th and 9th if the EU is considered a single trading entity). From 1991 to 2005, Mexican trade increased fivefold. Mexico is the biggest exporter and importer in Latin America; in 2020, Mexico alone exported US$417.7 billion, roughly equivalent to the sum of the exports of the next 5 largest exporters (Brazil, Chile, Argentina, Peru, and Colombia).

Mexican trade is fully integrated with that of its North American partners: as of 2019, approximately 80% of Mexican exports and 50% of its imports were traded with the United States and Canada. Nonetheless, NAFTA has not produced trade diversion. While trade with the United States increased 183% from 1993 to 2002, and that with Canada 165%, other trade agreements have shown even more impressive results: trade with Chile increased 285%, with Costa Rica 528% and Honduras 420%. Trade with the European Union increased 105% over the same time period.

=== Free trade agreements ===
Mexico joined the General Agreement on Tariffs and Trade (GATT) in 1986, and today is an active and constructive participant of the World Trade Organization. Fox's administration promoted the establishment of a Free Trade Area of the Americas; Puebla served as temporary headquarters for the negotiations, and several other cities are now candidates for its permanent headquarters if the agreement is reached and implemented.

Mexico has signed 12 free trade agreements with 44 countries:

- The North American Free Trade Agreement (NAFTA) (1992) later United States–Mexico–Canada Agreement (USMCA) (2019) with the United States and Canada;
- Grupo de los tres, Group of the three [countries], or G-3 (1994) with Colombia and Venezuela; the latter decided to terminate the agreement in 2006;
- Free Trade Agreement with Costa Rica (1994); superseded by the 2011 integrated Free Trade Agreement with the Central American countries;
- Free Trade Agreement with Bolivia (1994); terminated in 2010;
- Free Trade Agreement with Nicaragua (1997); superseded by the 2011 integrated Free Trade Agreement with the Central American countries;

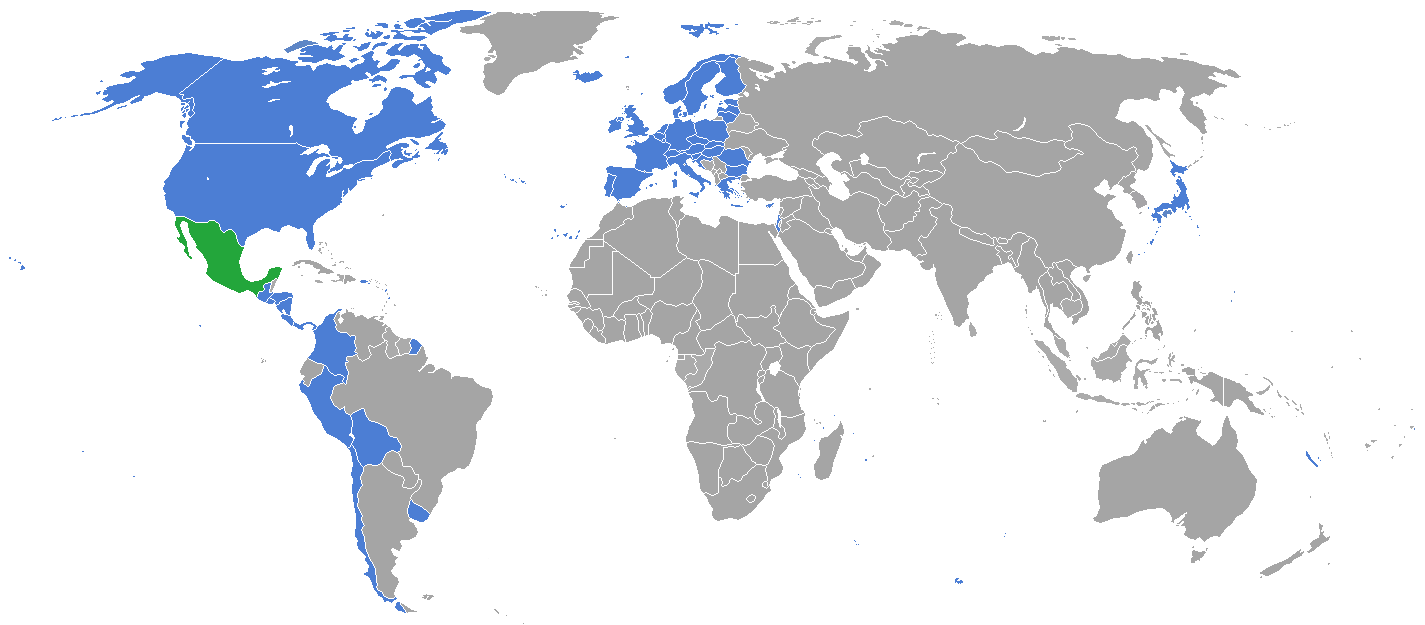
Countries with which Mexico has signed an FTA

- Free Trade Agreement with Chile (1998);
- Free Trade Agreement with the European Union (2000);
- Free Trade Agreement with Israel (2000);
- Northern Triangle Free Trade Agreement (2000), with Guatemala, El Salvador and Honduras; superseded by the 2011 integrated Free Trade Agreement with the Central American countries;
- Free Trade Agreement with the European Free Trade Association (EFTA), integrated by Iceland, Norway, Liechtenstein and Switzerland (2001);
- Free Trade Agreement with Uruguay (2003);
- Free Trade Agreement with Japan (2004);
- Free Trade Agreement with Peru (2011);
- The integrated Free Trade Agreement with Costa Rica, El Salvador, Guatemala, Honduras and Nicaragua (2011);
- Free Trade Agreement with Panama (2014); and
- The Comprehensive and Progressive Agreement for Trans-Pacific Partnership (CPTPP) (2018).

Mexico has shown interest in becoming an associate member of Mercosur.

The Mexican government has also started negotiations with the United Kingdom, South Korea, Singapore and Peru, and also wishes to start negotiations with Australia for a trade agreement between the two countries.

==== North American Trade Agreement and the USMCA Agreement ====
The NAFTA emblem

The 1994 North American Free Trade Agreement (NAFTA) is by far the most important Trade Agreement Mexico has signed both in the magnitude of reciprocal trade with its partners as well as in its scope. Unlike the other Free Trade Agreements that Mexico has signed, NAFTA is more comprehensive in scope and was complemented by the North American Agreement for Environmental Cooperation (NAAEC) and the North American Agreement on Labor Cooperation (NAALC). An updating of the 1994 NAFTA, the U.S., Mexico, Canada (USMCA) is pending in early 2020, awaiting the ratification by Canada; the U.S. and Mexico have ratified it.

The NAAEC agreement was a response to environmentalists' concerns that companies would relocate to Mexico or that the United States would lower its standards if the three countries did not achieve a unanimous environmental regulation. The NAAEC, in an aim to be more than a set of environmental regulations, established the North American Commission for Environmental Cooperation (NACEC), a mechanism for addressing trade and environmental issues, the North American Development Bank (NADBank) for assisting and financing investments in pollution reduction and the Border Environmental Cooperation Commission (BECC). The NADBank and the BECC have provided economic benefits to Mexico by financing 36 projects, mostly in the water sector. By complementing NAFTA with the NAAEC, it has been labeled the "greenest" trade agreement.

The NAALC supplement to NAFTA aimed to create a foundation for cooperation among the three members to resolve labor problems, as well as to promote greater cooperation among trade unions and social organizations in all three countries to fight for improved labor conditions. Though most economists agree that it is difficult to assess the direct impact of the NAALC, it is agreed that there has been a convergence of labor standards in North America. Given its limitations, however, NAALC has not produced (and in fact was not intended to achieve) convergence in employment, productivity and salary trend in North America.

The agreement fell short in liberalizing the movement of people across the three countries. In a limited way, however, immigration of skilled Mexican and Canadian workers to the United States was permitted under the TN status. NAFTA allows a wide range of professions, most of which require at least a bachelor's degree, for which a Mexican or Canadian citizen can request TN status and temporarily immigrate to the United States. Unlike the visas available to other countries, TN status requires no sponsorship, but simply a job offer letter.

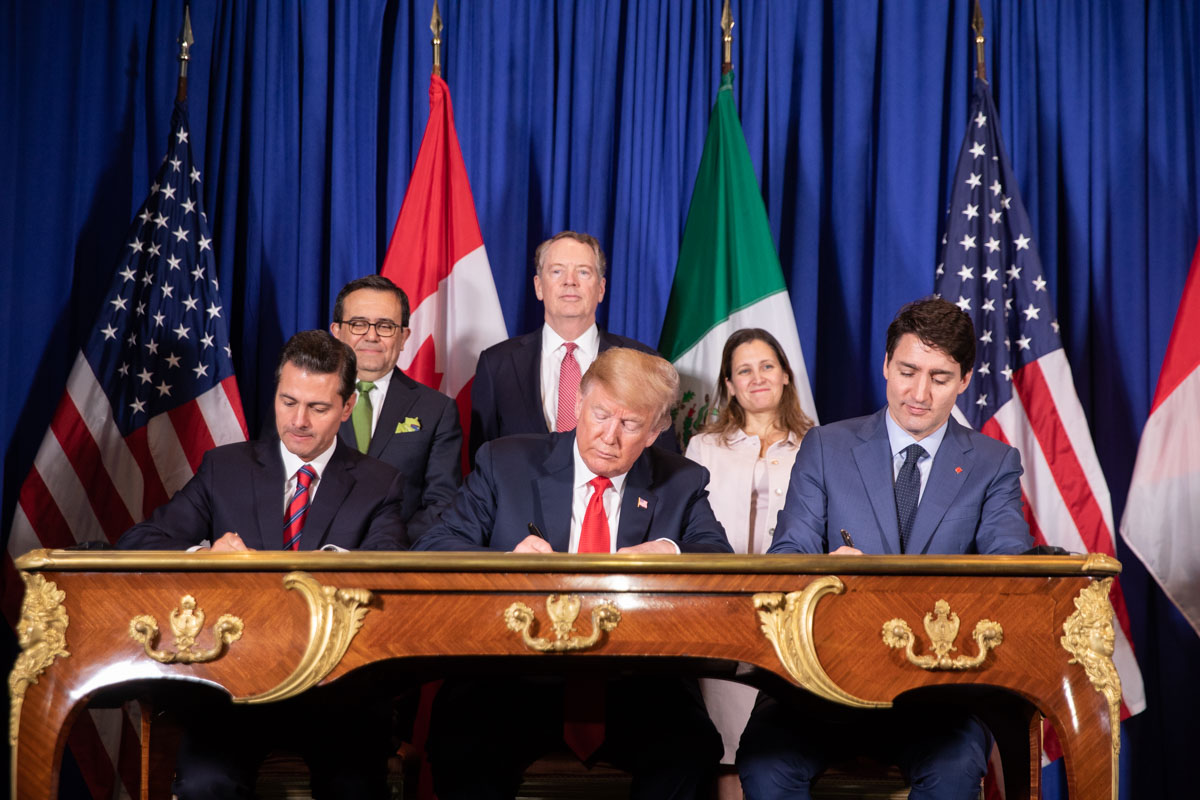
Outgoing Mexican President Enrique Peña Nieto, U.S. President Donald Trump, and Canadian Prime Minister Justin Trudeau sign the agreement during the G20 summit in Buenos Aires, Argentina, on November 30, 2018.

The overall benefits of NAFTA have been quantified by several economists, whose findings have been reported in several publications like the World Bank's Lessons from NAFTA for Latin America and the Caribbean, NAFTA's Impact on North America, and NAFTA revisited by the Institute for International Economics. They assess that NAFTA has been positive for Mexico, whose poverty rates have fallen, and real income salaries have risen even after accounting for the 1994–1995 economic crisis. Nonetheless, they also state that it has not been enough, or fast enough, to produce an economic convergence nor to reduce the poverty rates substantially or to promote higher rates of growth. Beside this the textile industry gain hype with this agreement and the textile industry in Mexico gained open access to the American market, promoting exports to the United States. The value of Mexican cotton and apparel exports to the U.S. grew from $3 billion in 1995 to $8.4 billion in 2002, a record high of $9.4 billion in 2000. At the same time, the share of Mexico's cotton textile market the U.S. has increased from 8 percent in 1995 to 13 percent in 2002. Some have suggested that in order to fully benefit from the agreement, Mexico should invest in education and promote innovation, as well as in infrastructure and agriculture.

Contrary to popular belief, the maquiladora program dates back to 1965, far before NAFTA. A maquiladora manufacturer operates by importing raw materials into Mexico, either tariff-free (NAFTA) or at a reduced rate on a temporary basis (18 months), and then using Mexico's relatively lower labor costs to produce finished goods for export. Prior to NAFTA, maquiladora companies importing raw materials from anywhere in the world were given preferential tariff rates by the Mexican government so long as the finished goods were for export. The US, prior to NAFTA, allowed Maquiladora-manufactured goods to be imported into the US, with the tariff applied only to the value of non-US raw materials used to produce the goods, thus reducing the tariff relative to other countries. NAFTA has eliminated all tariffs on goods between the two countries, but for the maquiladora industry, significantly increased tariff rates on goods sourced outside NAFTA.

Given the overall size of trade between Mexico and the United States, there are remarkably few trade disputes involving relatively small dollar amounts. These disputes are generally settled in WTO or NAFTA panels or through negotiations between the two countries. The most significant areas of friction involve trucking, sugar, high-fructose corn syrup, and other agricultural products.

=== Mexican trade facilitation and competitiveness ===
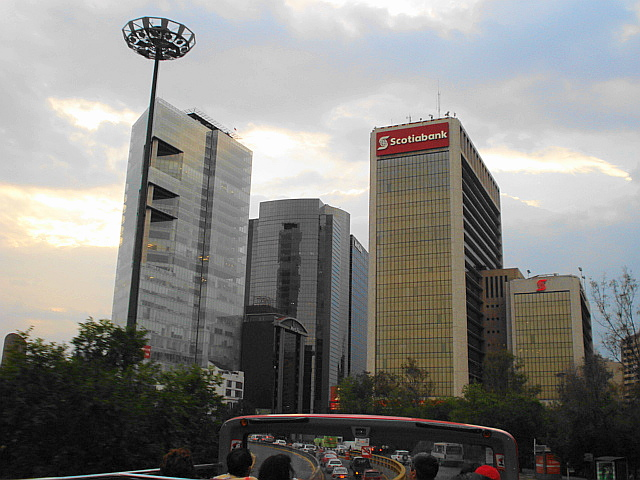
Polanco has one of the most expensive streets in the Americas Avenida Presidente Masaryk. The buildings to the left of the Scotiabank tower are not in Polanco, they are in Lomas de Chapultepec.

A 2008 research brief published by the World Bank as part of its Trade Costs and Facilitation Project suggested that Mexico had the potential to substantially increase trade flows and economic growth through trade facilitation reform. The study examined the potential impacts of trade facilitation reforms in four areas: port efficiency, customs administration, information technology, and regulatory environment (including standards).

The study projected overall increments from domestic reforms to be on the order of $31.8 billion, equivalent to 22.4 percent of total Mexican manufacturing exports for 2000–03. On the imports side, the corresponding figures are $17.1 billion and 11.2 percent, respectively. Increases in exports, including textiles, would result primarily from improvements in port efficiency and the regulatory environment. Exports of transport equipment would be expected to increase by the greatest increment from improvements in port efficiency, whereas exports of food and machinery would largely be the result of improvements in the regulatory environment. On the imports side, Mexican improvements in port efficiency would appear to be the most important factor, although for imports of transport equipment, improvements in service sector infrastructure would also be of relative importance.

=== Trade statistics ===
Exports of Mexico by product category (2019) Chemical products Transportation Machines Mineral products Plastics and rubbers Metals Foodstuffs Precious metals Textiles Instruments Animal products Vegetable products Paper goods Footwear and headwear Miscellaneous Stone and glass Wood products Animal and vegetable bi-products Animal hides Arts and antiques Weapons

The following table shows the largest trading partners for Mexico in 2021 by total trade value in billions of USD.

| Country | Trade Value | Import Value | Export Value | Balance |
|---|---|---|---|---|
| United States | 609.67 | 221.31 | 388.36 | 167.05 |
| China | 120.16 | 101.02 | 19.14 | -81.88 |
| Canada | 37.93 | 11.22 | 26.71 | 15.49 |
| South Korea | 26.85 | 18.96 | 7.89 | -11.08 |
| Germany | 26.50 | 17.21 | 9.29 | -7.93 |
| Japan | 22.85 | 17.08 | 5.78 | -11.30 |
| Brazil | 13.49 | 8.72 | 4.77 | -3.95 |
| Malaysia | 12.95 | 12.39 | 0.556 | -11.83 |
| Spain | 10.10 | 4.58 | 5.52 | 0.935 |
| India | 10.06 | 5.92 | 4.14 | -1.78 |

== See also ==
- List of companies of Mexico
- List of largest Mexican companies
- List of companies traded on the Mexican Stock Exchange
- List of Mexican billionaires by net worth
- Climate finance in Mexico
- Mexico and the International Monetary Fund
- Mexico and the World Bank
- Science and technology in Mexico
- Small and medium enterprises in Mexico
- Economy of North America
