= List of companies of Mexico =

Location of Mexico

Mexico is a federal republic in the southern half of North America. Mexico has the fifteenth largest nominal GDP and the eleventh largest by purchasing power parity. The Mexican economy is strongly linked to those of its North American Free Trade Agreement (NAFTA) partners, especially the United States. Mexico was the first Latin American member of the Organisation for Economic Co-operation and Development (OECD), joining in 1994. It is classified as an upper-middle income country by the World Bank and a newly industrialized country by several analysts. By 2050, Mexico could become the world's fifth or seventh largest economy. The country is considered both a regional power and middle power, and is often identified as an emerging global power. Mexico is a member of the United Nations, the World Trade Organization, the G8+5, the G20, the Uniting for Consensus and the Pacific Alliance.

For further information on the types of business entities in this country and their abbreviations, see "Business entities in México".

== Largest firms ==
This list shows firms in the Fortune Global 500, which ranks firms by total revenues reported before March 31, 2017. Only the top five firms (if available) are included as a sample.

Rank	Image	Name	2016 Revenues (US$M)	Employees	Notes
152		Pemex	57,774	125,689	State-owned oil and gas entity controlling much of the Mexican market. The firm was created through the nationalization of all foreign oil companies in Mexico in 1938 and governs oil exploration, extraction, refining, and commercialization in the country.
176		América Móvil	52,201	194,193	Global mobile telecommunications firm with 289 million subscribers, making it one of the largest in the world. Notable subsidiaries include Claro, Telmex, NET, Embratel, Telcel, TracFone Wireless, and Page Plus Cellular.

== Notable firms ==
This list includes notable companies with primary headquarters located in the country. The industry and sector follow the Industry Classification Benchmark taxonomy. Organizations which have ceased operations are included and noted as defunct.

Notable companies Status: P=Private, S=State; A=Active, D=Defunct
Name	Industry	Sector	Headquarters	Founded	Notes	Status	
Aeroméxico Connect	Consumer services	Airlines	Monterrey	1988	Regional airline, part of Aeroméxico	P	A
Aeroméxico	Consumer services	Airlines	Mexico City	1988	Airline	P	A
Aeromexpress	Industrials	Delivery services	Mexico City	1990	Cargo airline, part of Aeroméxico	P	A
AeroUnion	Industrials	Delivery services	Mexico City	1998	Cargo airline; shipping	P	A
Ah Cacao Real Chocolate	Consumer goods	Food products	Playa del Carmen	2003	Confectionery	P	A
ALFA	Conglomerates	-	Monterrey	1974	Food & beverage, industrials, oil & gas, (BMV: ALFA)	P	A
Alpek	Oil & gas	Exploration & production	Monterrey	1975	Petrochemical, part of ALFA	P	A
Alpura	Consumer goods	Food products	Mexico City	1973	Dairy products	P	A
Altos Hornos de México	Basic materials	Iron & steel	Monclova	1942	Steel, (BMV: AHMSA)	P	A
América Móvil	Telecommunications	Mobile telecommunications	Mexico City	2000	Mobile network, (BMV: AMX)	P	A
Arca Continental	Consumer goods	Soft drinks	Monterrey	2001	Bottling, (BMV: CONTAL)	P	A
Argos Comunicación	Consumer services	Broadcasting & entertainment	Mexico City	1992	Film production	P	A
AT&T Mexico	Telecommunications	Mobile telecommunications	Mexico City	2015	Wireless, part of AT&T (US)	P	A
Atletica	Consumer goods	Clothing & accessories	San Miguel el Alto	1995	Sportswear	P	A
Aurrerá	Consumer services	Broadline retailers	Mexico City	1958	Defunct, acquired by Wal-Mart (USA)	P	D
Autobuses de Oriente (ADO)	Consumer services	Travel & tourism	Mexico City	1939	Bus lines	P	A
Aviacsa	Consumer services	Airlines	Mexico City	1990	Airline, defunct 2011	P	D
Avolar	Consumer services	Airlines	Tijuana	2005	Airline, defunct 2008	P	D
Azteca	Consumer services	Broadcasting & entertainment	Mexico City	1993	Television, part of Grupo Salinas	P	A
Bachoco	Consumer goods	Food products	Celaya	1965	Poultry, (BMV: BACHOCO)	P	A
Banco Azteca	Financials	Banks	Mexico City	2002	Bank, part of Grupo Salinas	P	A
Banco Santander (Mexico)	Financials	Banks	Mexico City	1991	Part of Banco Santander (Spain)	P	A
Bancomext	Financials	Banks	Mexico City	1937	State bank	S	A
Banorte	Financials	Banks	Monterrey	1899	Bank, (BMV: GFNORTE)	P	A
BanRegio	Financials	Banks	Monterrey	1994	Bank	P	A
Barcel	Consumer goods	Food products	Lerma	1950	Part of Grupo Bimbo	P	A
BBVA Bancomer	Financials	Banks	Mexico City	1932	Part of BBVA (Spain)	P	A
Benedetti's Pizza	Consumer services	Restaurants & bars	Colima City	1983	Fast food	P	A
Cablemás	Telecommunications	Fixed line telecommunications	Mexico City	1968	Cable	P	D
Calimax	Consumer services	Food retailers & wholesalers	Tijuana	1939	Grocery	P	A
Camino Real	Consumer services	Hotels	Mexico City	1958	Hotels and resorts	P	A
Canel's	Consumer goods	Food products	San Luis Potosí	1925	Confectionery	P	A
Carso Global Telecom	Telecommunications	Fixed line telecommunications	Mexico City	1996	Telecommunications (BMV: TELECOM)	P	A
Casa Ley	Consumer services	Food retailers & wholesalers	Culiacan	1954	Part of Albertsons Companies, Inc. (USA)	P	A
Cemento Cruz Azul	Industrials	Building materials & fixtures	Mexico City	1881	Cement	P	A
Cemex	Industrials	Building materials & fixtures	Monterrey	1906	Construction, materials, engineering	P	A
Charly	Consumer goods	Clothing & accessories	León, Guanajuato	1949	Sportswear	P	A
Chedraui	Consumer services	Food retailers & wholesalers	Mexico City	1927	Grocery	P	A
Cinemex	Consumer services	Recreational services	Mexico City	1993	Owned by Onex Corporation (Canada), Oaktree Capital Management (USA)	P	A
Cinépolis	Consumer services	Recreational services	Morelia	1947	Theaters	P	A
City Club	Consumer services	Broadline retailers	Monterrey	2002	Wholesale club	P	A
Comercial Mexicana	Consumer services	Food retailers & wholesalers	Mexico City	1930	Grocery, defunct 2018	P	D
Comex Group	Industrials	Construction & materials	Mexico City	1959	Paint, owned by PPG Industries	P	A
Comisión Federal de Electricidad	Utilities	Electricity	Mexico City	1937	State-owned energy	S	A
Consejo Mundial de Lucha Libre	Consumer services	Recreational services	Mexico City	1933	Wrestling	P	A
Consorcio ARA	Industrials	Heavy construction	Mexico City	1977	Construction (BMV: ARA)	P	A
Coppel	Consumer services	Department stores	Culiacán	1941	Retail	P	A
Correos de México	Industrials	Delivery services	Mexico City	1580	Postal services	S	A
Cuauhtémoc Moctezuma Brewery	Consumer goods	Brewers	Monterrey	1890	Part of Heineken International (Netherlands)	P	A
Cervecería Baja California	Consumer goods	Brewers	Mexicali	2002	Brewery	P	A
DINA S.A.	Industrials	Commercial vehicles & trucks	Ciudad Sahagún	1951	Buses, trucks, parts, military vehicles	P	A
El Financiero	Consumer services	Publishing	Mexico City	1981	Publishing	P	A
El Palacio de Hierro	Consumer services	Restaurants & bars	Mexico City	1850	Stores and restaurants (BMV: GPH)	P	A
Estafeta Carga Aérea	Industrials	Delivery services	Mexico City	2000	Cargo airline; shipping	P	A
Expansión	Consumer services	Publishing	Mexico City	1966	Part of Time Inc. (US)	P	A
Falco Electronics	Consumer goods	Consumer electronics	Mérida	1991	Electronics, electronic parts	P	A
Farmacias Benavides	Consumer services	Drug retailers	Monterrey	1971	Pharmacies (BMV: BEVIDES)	P	A
FEMSA	Consumer goods	Soft drinks	Monterrey	1974	Beverages (BMV: FEMSA)	P	A
Ferrocarriles Nacionales de México	Industrials	Railroads	Mexico City	1903	Railway, defunct 2001	P	D
Fondo de Cultura Económica	Consumer services	Publishing	Mexico City	1934	Publishing	P	A
Gamesa	Consumer goods	Soft drinks	San Nicolás de los Garza	1921	Part of PepsiCo (USA)	P	A
Gorditas Doña Tota	Consumer services	Retail	Monterrey	1952	Restaurant chain, part of FEMSA	P	A
Gruma	Consumer goods	Food & beverage	Monterrey	1949	Tortillas (BMV: GRUMA)	P	A
Grupo Aeroportuario del Sureste	Industrials	Transportation services	Mexico City	1998	Airport (BMV: ASUR)	P	A
Grupo Anderson's	Consumer services	Restaurants & bars	Cancún	1963	Restaurants	P	A
Grupo BAL	Conglomerates	-	Mexico City	-	Energy, metallurgy, finance, insurance	P	A
Grupo Bimbo	Consumer goods	Food products	Mexico City	1945	Food conglomerate (BMV: BIMBO)	P	A
Grupo Carso	Conglomerates	-	Mexico City	1990	Industrials, media, retail, telecom (BMV: GCARSO)	P	A
Grupo CIE	Consumer services	Broadcasting & entertainment	Mexico City	1990	Entertainment (BMV: CIE)	P	A
Grupo Elektra	Financials	Consumer finance	Mexico City	1950	Financial services (BMV: ELEKTRA)	P	A
Grupo Famsa	Consumer services	Broadline retailers	Monterrey	1970	Retail	P	A
Grupo Financiero Banamex	Financials	Banks	Mexico City	1884	Part of Citigroup (US)	P	A
Grupo Lala	Consumer goods	Food products	Gómez Palacio	1950	Dairy	P	A
Grupo México	Basic materials	General mining	Mexico City	1978	Mining, (BMV: GMEXICO)	P	A
Grupo Modelo	Consumer goods	Brewers	Mexico City	1992	Part Anheuser-Busch InBev (Belgium)	P	A
Grupo Omnilife	Consumer goods	Personal products	Guadalajara	1991	Nutrition and skin care	P	A
Grupo Posadas	Consumer services	Travel & tourism	Mexico City	1967	Tourism (BMV: POSADAS)	P	A
Grupo Reforma	Consumer services	Publishing	Monterrey	1922	Publishing	P	A
Grupo Salinas / Grupo Azteca	Conglomerates	-	Monterrey	1906	Media, financials, telecommunications	P	A
Grupo Sanborns	Consumer services	Broadline retailers	Mexico City	1903	Retail (BMV: GSANBOR)	P	A
Grupo Vazol	Conglomerates	-	Mexico City	1998	Media, healthcare, tourism, financials	P	A
HSBC Mexico	Financials	Banks	Mexico City	1941	Part of HSBC (UK)	P	A
Hydra Technologies	Consumer goods	Aerospace & defense	Zapopan	?	Aircraft, UAV	P	A
Banco Inbursa	Financials	Banks	Mexico City	1992	Bank (BMV: GFINBUR)	P	A
Interjet	Consumer services	Airlines	Mexico City	2005	Airline, defunct 2020	P	D
Italika	Consumer goods	Automobiles	Toluca	2005	Motorcycles, ATV	P	A
Jarritos	Consumer goods	Soft drinks	Guadalajara	1950	Beverage	P	A
Jose Cuervo	Consumer goods	Alcoholic drinks	Tequila	1795	Beverage	P	A
Jumex	Consumer goods	Soft drinks	Ecatepec de Morelos	1961	Beverage	P	A
Kavak	Consumer services	E-commerce, Financial technology	Mexico City	2016	Car sales	P	A
Kyoto Electronics	Consumer goods	Consumer electronics	Mexico City	2009	Consumer electronics	P	A
La Comer	Consumer services	Food retailers & wholesalers	Mexico City	1944	Grocery	P	A
La Costeña	Consumer goods	Food products	Mexico City	1923	Canned food	P	A
Lanix	Consumer goods	Consumer electronics	Hermosillo	1990	Electronics	P	A
Liverpool	Consumer services	Broadline retailers	Mexico City	1847	Department stores (BMV: LIVEPOL)	P	A
Lucha Libre AAA Worldwide	Consumer services	Recreational services	Mexico City	1992	Wrestling promotion	P	A
Mabe	Consumer goods	Durable household products	Mexico City	1946	Appliances	P	A
Mastretta	Consumer goods	Automobiles	Mexico City	1987	Automobiles	P	A
Mayordomo	Consumer goods	Food products	Oaxaca City	1956	Confectionery	P	A
Meebox	Consumer goods	Consumer electronics	Guadalajara	2009	Consumer/commercial electronics	P	A
Mexicana de Aviación	Consumer services	Airlines	Mexico City	1923	Airline, defunct 2010	P	D
MexicanaClick	Consumer services	Airlines	Mexico City	2005	Airline, defunct 2010	P	D
Mexico City Metrobús	Consumer services	Travel & tourism	Mexico City	2005	State-owned bus line	S	A
MVS Comunicaciones	Consumer services	Broadcasting & entertainment	Mexico City	1967	Radio and television	P	A
Ocesa Teatro	Consumer services	Recreational services	Mexico City	1997	Theater, part of Grupo CIE	P	A
Orbia	Oil & gas	Exploration & production	Tlalnepantla de Baz	1953	Petrochemical (BMV: MEXCHEM)	P	A
OXXO	Consumer services	Food retailers & wholesalers	Monterrey	1977	Grocery, part of FEMSA	P	A
Paletería La Michoacana	Consumer services	Restaurants & bars	Mexico City	1940	Ice cream parlor chain	P	A
Panam	Consumer goods	Clothing & accessories	Mexico City	1962	Footwear	P	A
Pascual Boing	Consumer goods	Soft drinks	Mexico City	1940	Beverage	P	A
Pemex	Oil & gas	Exploration & production	Mexico City	1938	State-owned petroleum	S	A
Peñoles	Basic materials	General mining	Mexico City	1887	Mining (BMV: PENOLES)	P	A
Restaurante Arroyo	Consumer services	Restaurants & bars	Mexico City	1940	Restaurants	P	A
Sabritas	Consumer goods	Soft drinks	Mexico City	1943	Part of PepsiCo (US)	P	A
Satmex	Telecommunications	Fixed line telecommunications	Mexico City	1997	Communications, defunct 2014	P	D
Sauza Tequila	Consumer goods	Food products	Guadalajara	1873	Part of Suntory (Japan)	P	A
Semex	Consumer goods	Consumer electronics	Mexico City	1997	Consumer electronics, part of Sharp Corporation (Japan)	P	A
Señor Frog's	Consumer services	Restaurants & bars	Mexico City	1989	Restaurants	P	A
Sigma Alimentos	Consumer goods	Food products	Monterrey	1980	Food	P	A
Softtek	Technology	Software	Monterrey	1982	Software, IT solutions	P	A
Soriana	Consumer services	Food retailers & wholesalers	Monterrey	1968	Grocery (BMV: SORIANA)	P	A
TAESA Lineas Aéreas	Consumer services	Airlines	Monterrey	1988	Airline, defunct 2000	P	D
Televisa	Consumer services	Broadcasting & entertainment	Mexico City	1973	Mass media (BMV: TLEVISA)	P	A
Telmex	Telecommunications	Fixed line telecommunications	Mexico City	1947	Fixed line, part of América Móvil (BMV: TELMEX)	P	A
Tequila Herradura	Consumer goods	Food products	Amatitán	1870	Part of Brown-Forman (US)	P	A
Cerveza Tijuana	Consumer goods	Brewers	Tijuana	2000	Brewery	P	A
Urbi	Industrials	Heavy construction	Mexicali	1981	Construction, real estate	P	A
Videxport	Consumer goods	Food products	Hermosillo	1975	Fruits and nuts	P	A
Viva	Consumer services	Airlines	Mexico City	2006	Airline	P	A
Volaris	Consumer services	Airlines	Mexico City	2004	Airline	P	A
Zonda Telecom	Consumer goods	Consumer electronics	Guadalajara	1968	Electronics, mobile telephones	P	A

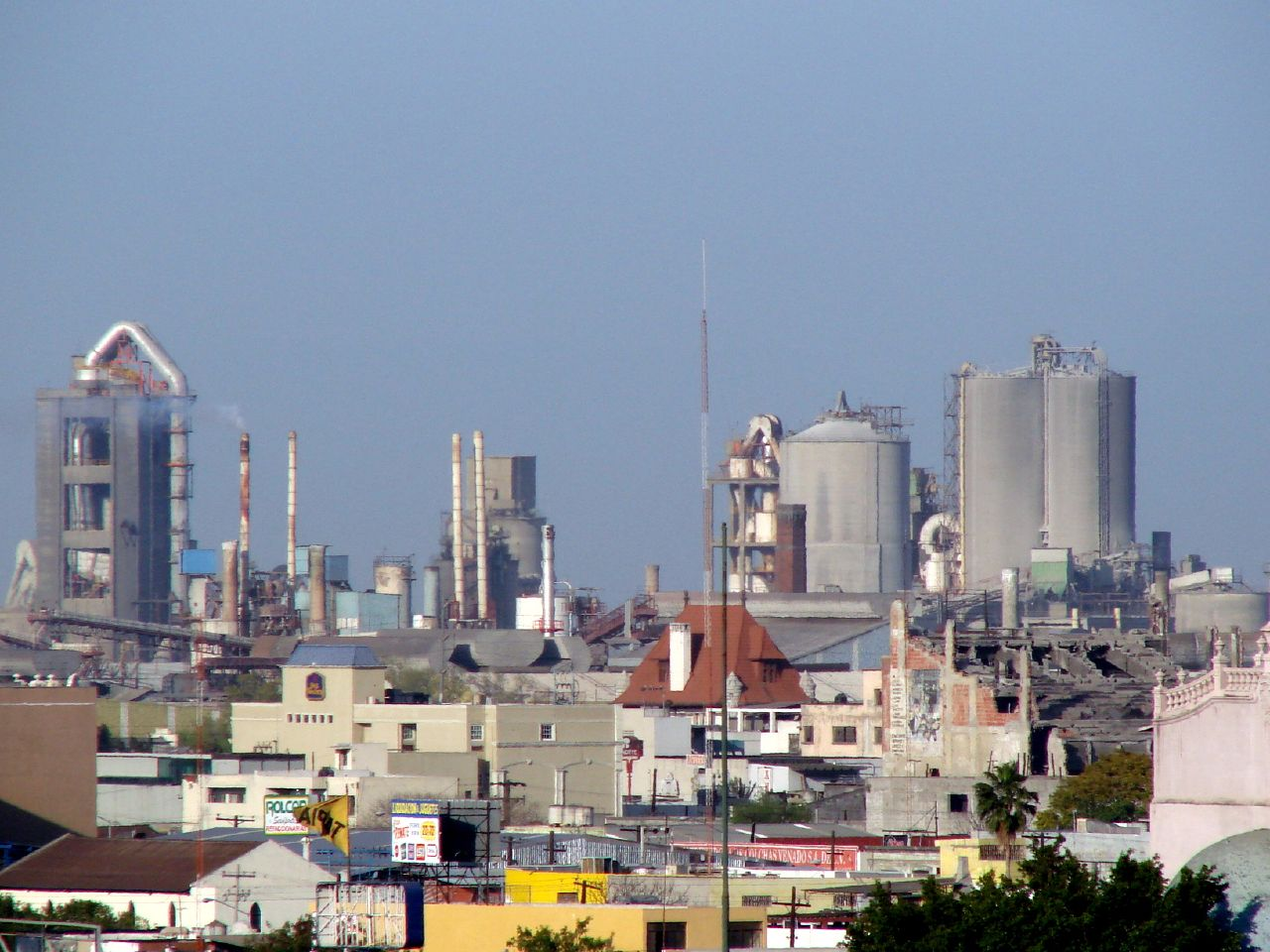
Cemex plant on the outskirts of Monterrey.

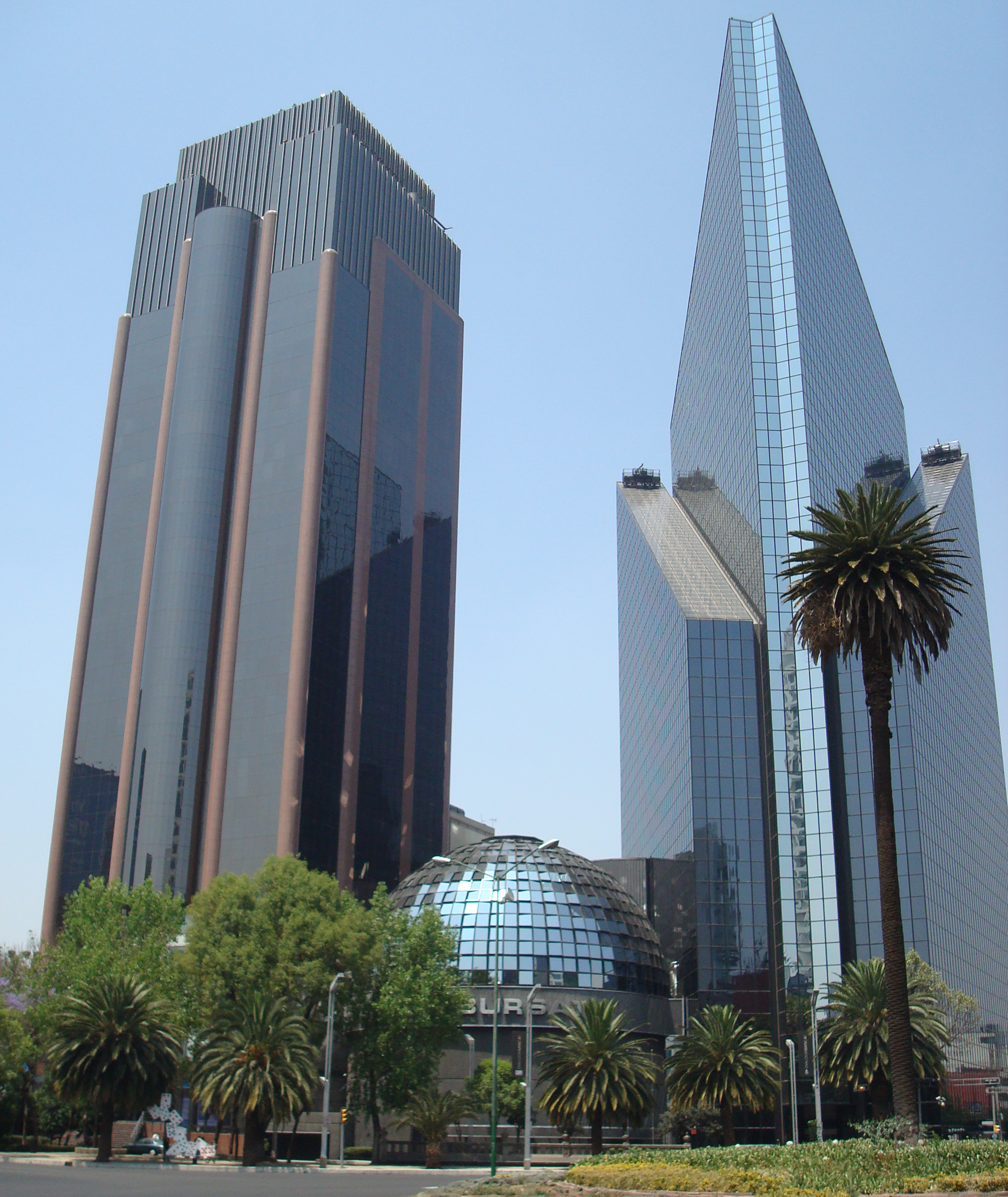
The Mexican Stock Exchange.

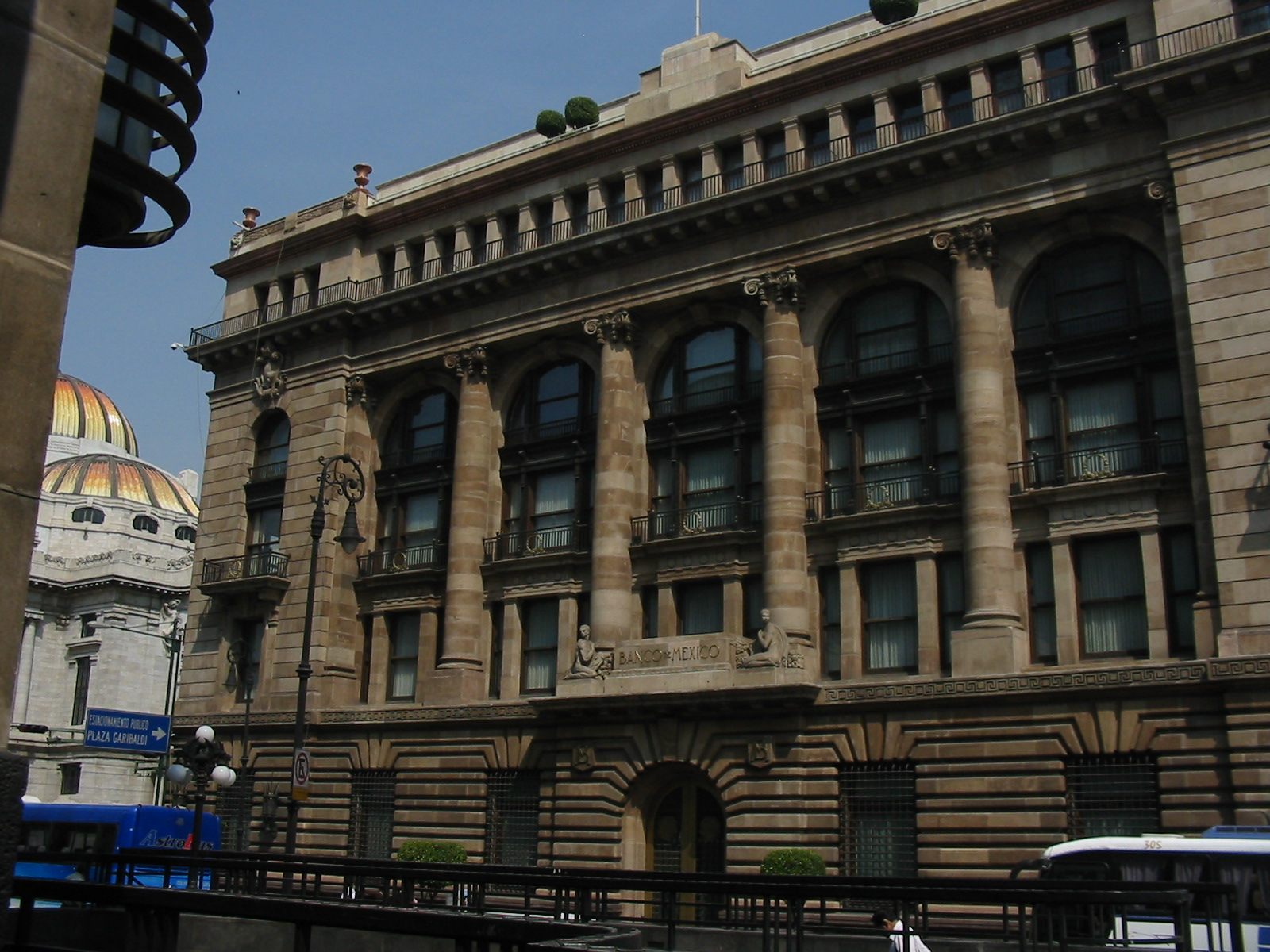
Banco de México headquarters.

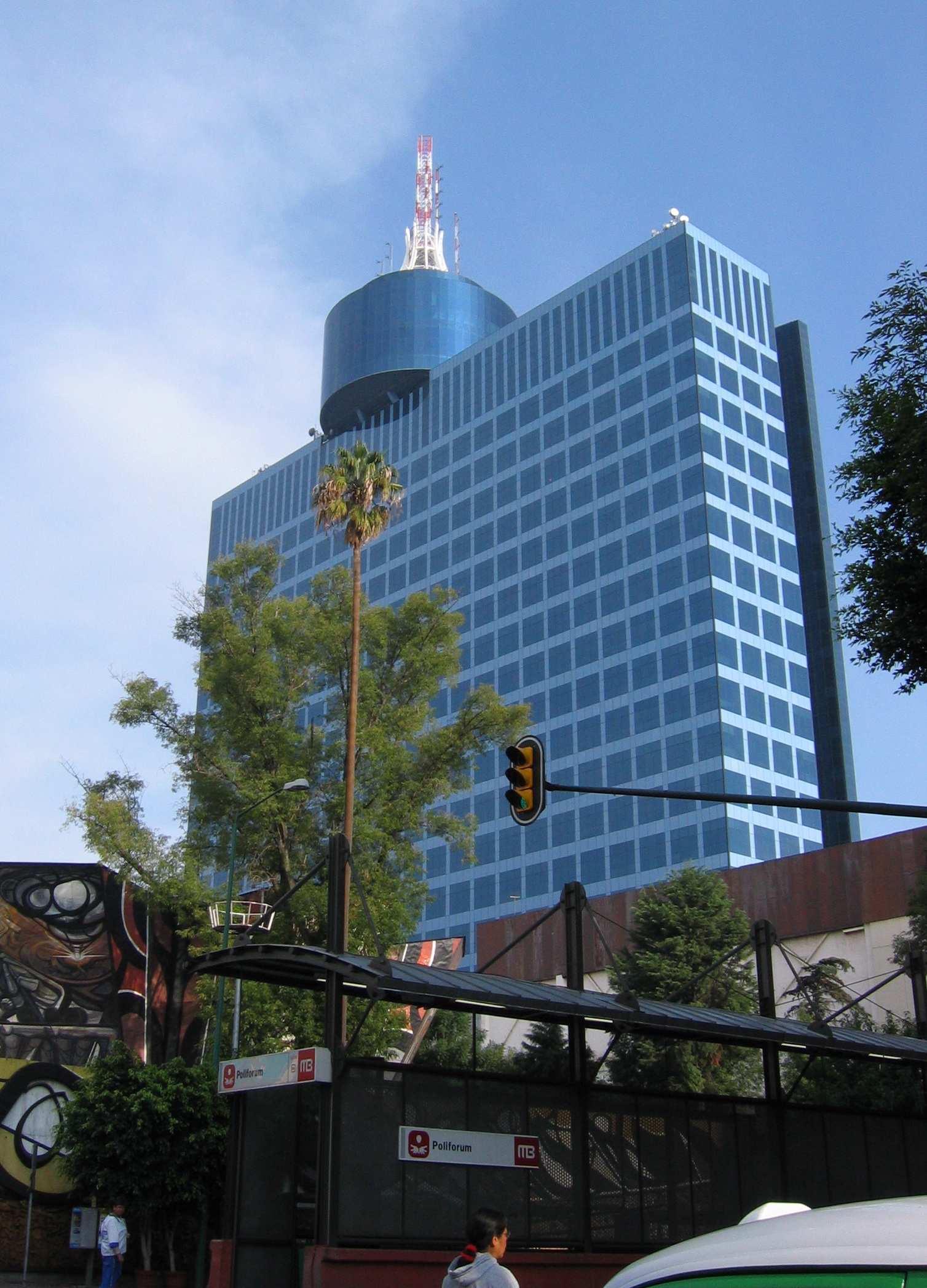
World Trade Center in Mexico City.

== See also ==
- Economy of Mexico
- List of hotels in Mexico
- List of Mexican brands
- Mexican Stock Exchange
- Small and medium enterprises in Mexico
