= Bernardo Garza Sada =

Mexican businessman (1930–2009)

Bernardo Garza Sada (1930 – 7 November 2009) was a Mexican businessman who founded the Grupo ALFA conglomerate in 1974. He also served as ALFA's former president. Additionally, Garza Sada was a member of the company's board of directors for two decades.

Garza Sada, a graduate of the Massachusetts Institute of Technology (MIT), is credited with turning Grupo Alfa into a diversified conglomerate with revenues of $10.6 billion USD in 2008. ALFA currently consists of four major operations and consortia as of 2009 - Alpek, which produces petrochemicals and synthetic fiber; Sigma, which manufactures food; Nemak, which builds automotive parts; and Alestra, which consists of ALFA's telecommunications arm. Alfa also produces televisions, machinery, and has assets in Mexico's tourism sector.

Garza Sada also championed the modernization of Monterrey Institute of Technology, one of Mexico's most important private universities.

Garza Sada had a wife, with whom he had three children. He died at his home in Monterrey, Nuevo León, Mexico, on November 7, 2009, at the age of 79. In a statement released posthumously, ALFA called Garza Sada, "Leader and visionary businessman, promoter of education and social responsibility, driving force for the growth of the company and the country."
