= Blanca Treviño =

Mexican businesswoman

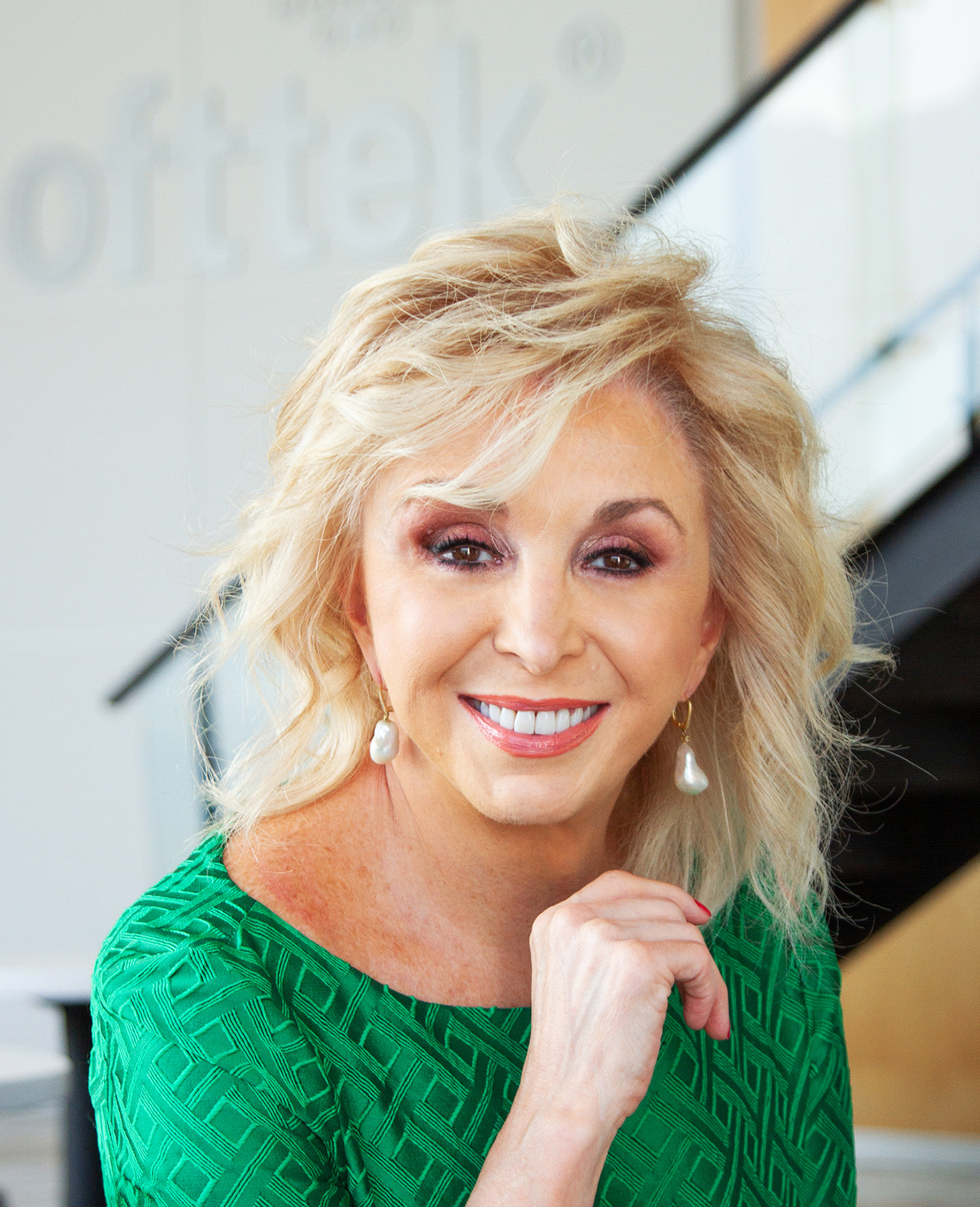
- Treviño in 2014
- Born: Blanca Avelina Treviño de Vega; Monterrey, Nuevo León, Mexico
- Education: Monterrey Institute of Technology and Higher Education
- Employer: Softtek
- Awards: Women in Technology Hall of Fame

Blanca Avelina Treviño de Vega (Monterrey, Nuevo León, Mexico) is a Mexican business executive who is CEO and president of Softtek, a Mexican information and communication technologies company and one of the largest independent service providers in Latin America.

== Education ==
Treviño earned her bachelor's in 1981 in computer systems administration at the Monterrey Institute of Technology and Higher Studies, Monterrey Campus. She was encouraged by her father to persist with her studies in a field that was very male dominated.

== Career ==
Treviño held a part-time job at Alfa, one of Monterrey's biggest companies, until the company downsized and laid her off. She then decided to form her own company. In 1982, she co-founded Softtek with $10,000 and nine partners, who dreamed of having a global enterprise. The company has since grown to have more than 15,000 employees, and thirty offices in Latin America, Europe and Asia. Softtek also has major global delivery centers in Monterrey, Ensenada, Aguascalientes and Mexico City in Mexico, as well as in São Paulo, Brazil; La Coruña, Spain; Wuxi, China; La Plata, Argentina; Bogotá, Colombia; Dallas, Texas; and Bangalore, India. The company's presence in the United States came through a Treviño initiative called "Nearshore" to provide outsourcing, taking advantage of Mexico's geographic proximity.

In 2000, she became President and CEO of Softtek, a role she will hold until October 2026, when David Jiménez will be appointed Global CEO and Treviño will become Executive President and continue as Chair of the Board of Directors.

Previously, she held the positions of team leader, vice president of sales and marketing, and general director of operations in the United States.

== Associations ==
Treviño is a Board Member of the UN Global Compact. Previously, she was Co-chair of the Partnership for Central America, an initiative supported by the US Vice President. In 2018, she became the first woman appointed to the Mexican Business Council, representing the largest companies in Mexico.

She participated for 15 years as an independent director of Walmart Mexico, as well as foreign companies such as Goldcorp and state-owned enterprises such as the Federal Electricity Commission.

== Recognition ==
In 2009, CNN Expansión magazine named her as one of the 50 most powerful women in Mexico, ranking her fourth. In 2011, the Endeavor organization for the development of new entrepreneurs also recognized her career in this field.

Treviño was the first woman to be inducted into the "Outsourcing Hall of Fame" of the International Association of Outsourcing.

In 2014, she was the first woman to be included in the Consejo Mexicano de Negocios, which caused them to change their name from Consejo Mexicano de Hombres de Negocios.

In 2018, Educando (formerly Worldfund) recognized Treviño with its "Education Leadership Award" for her contributions and influence in improving education in Mexico. Treviño was inducted into the Women in Technology Hall of Fame.
