= Alfa Planetarium =

Coordinates: 25°38′13″N 100°21′28″W

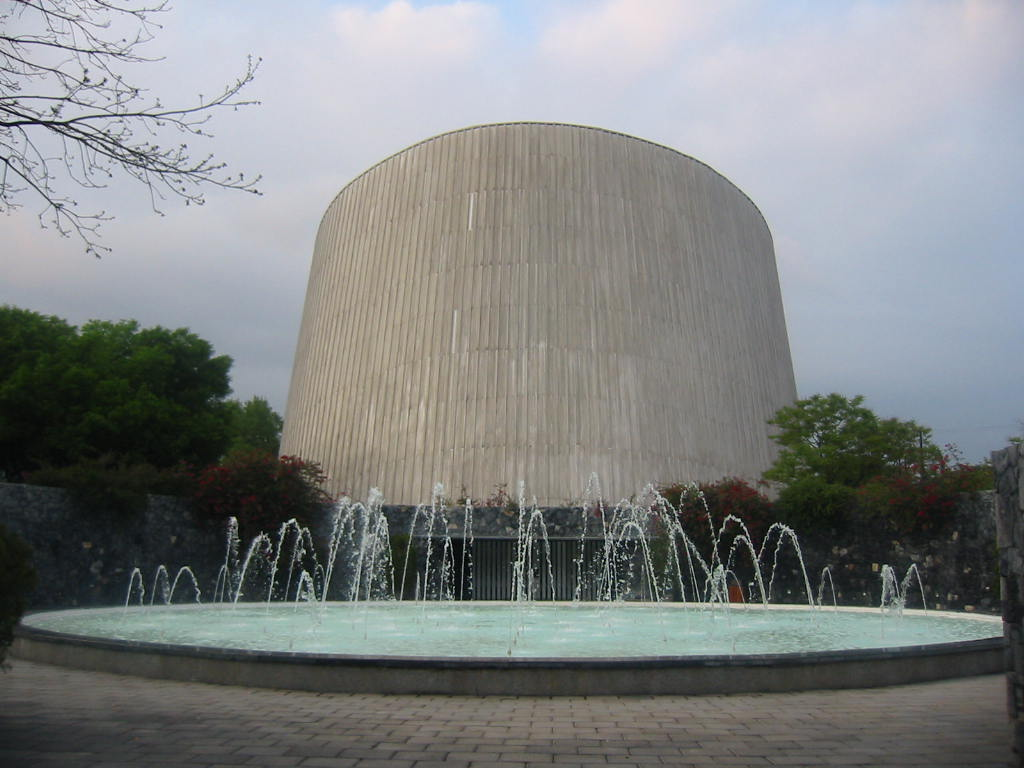
- Alfa Planetarium, museum, astronomical observatory and IMAX Dome system, Monterrey, NL, Mexico.
- Interactive map of Alfa Planetarium
- Date opened: October 11, 1978
- Date closed: September 4, 2020
- Location: Monterrey, Nuevo León, Mexico
- Memberships: Association of Science Technology Centers; Giant Screen Cinema Association; Asociación Mexicana de Museos y Centros de Ciencia y Tecnología; Red de Popularización de Ciencia; Federación Mexicana de Amigos de Museos
- Major exhibits: IMAX Dome System, Aviary, Gorilla Island
- Director: Julia Moreira

Alfa Planetarium (Spanish: Planetario Alfa) was a planetarium located in Monterrey, Nuevo León, Mexico. This institution was created by ALFA (Mexico) in 1978 to promote science and technology in Latin America. It included an interactive science museum, an Omnimax system cinema, an aviary and an area for temporary exhibits and events. The Alfa Planetarium was one of the most visited cultural centers in Mexico. While its main focus was on science, it also had some art pieces.

It was closed definitively on the 4th of September 2020, after 42 years of operation. The main reasons behind the decision were the lack of investment in upgrades required due to rapidly advancing technology, a reduction in revenue due to sanitary measures implemented during the COVID-19 pandemic, and a lack of public investment in cultural projects. It is thought to have had over 15.2 million visitors during its entire run. By the end of its life, it had over 500 pieces in its permanent exhibitions.

== History ==
It was inaugurated in October 1978, under its initial name of "Centro Cultural Alfa" translating to Alfa Cultural Center. At its inauguration the then Secretary of Education, Fernando Solana Morales, and the then president of the ALFA Group Bernardo Garza Sada were present. It was a revolutionary museum, in many ways, for Mexico and Latin America. For example, its Mega Screen IMAX Dome was the first to begin operating outside the United States in the continent.

Personalities such as the Mexican Nobel Literature Prize winner Octavio Paz, and the astronaut Rodolfo Neri Vela, stand out among the most relevant visitors to the Alfa Planetarium. In 2014 it was also visited by King Charles III, and by his wife Queen Camilla, where they met with the top companies of Nuevo Leon, and the Secretary of Economy.

On April 19, 2023, most of its former attractions were relocated and unveiled at the newly-inaugurated Museo Universitario de Ciencias, located on the right corner of the Preparatoria 3 of the UANL.

=== Additions ===
- In 1986 the Aviary was opened, being the first of its type in the whole country. It was composed of 25 different species, with over 200 specimens.
- In 1988 the "Pabellón El Universo" was opened, it had a stained glass monument called "El Universo" (English: The Universe), made by Rufino Tamayo. Though in 2017 this area would get burned, and the building was demolished a year later. With the stained glass being transferred to the Alfa offices.
- In 1994 the science garden was opened. With the objective of kids interacting and playing with the various games, where they would learn the various physics phenomena. It also had 14 exact replicas of prehispanic monuments.
- In 1998 a public observatory was opened, it was considered the biggest public observatory of all of Mexico. It also had an Auditorium, which was used for conferences and events.

== Architecture ==
It was designed by Fernando Garza, Samuel Weiffberg y Efraín Alemán. Its dome was 40 meters in diameter, and 34 meters high. It also had 63 degrees of inclination. It was made with reinforced concrete, and its structure was meant to resemble a telescope looking out toward the horizon.

== Gallery ==
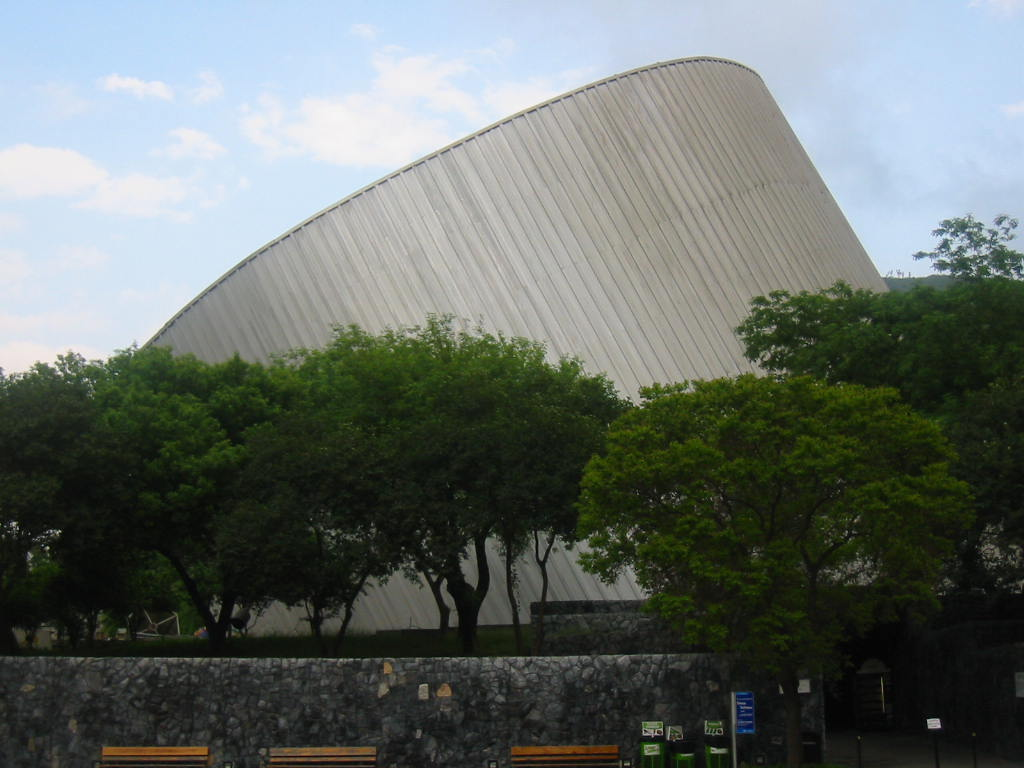
Planetario Alfa

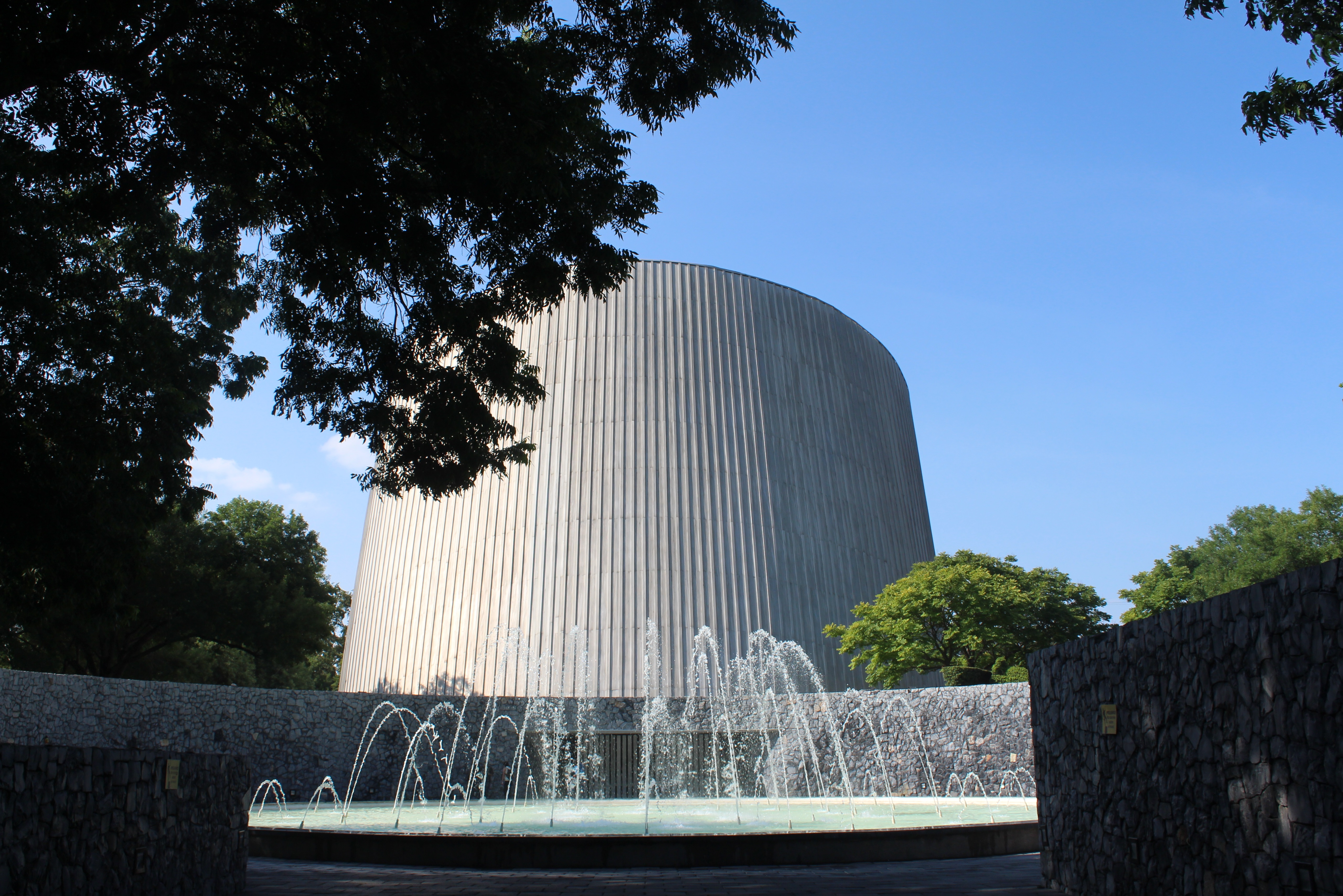
Main Building

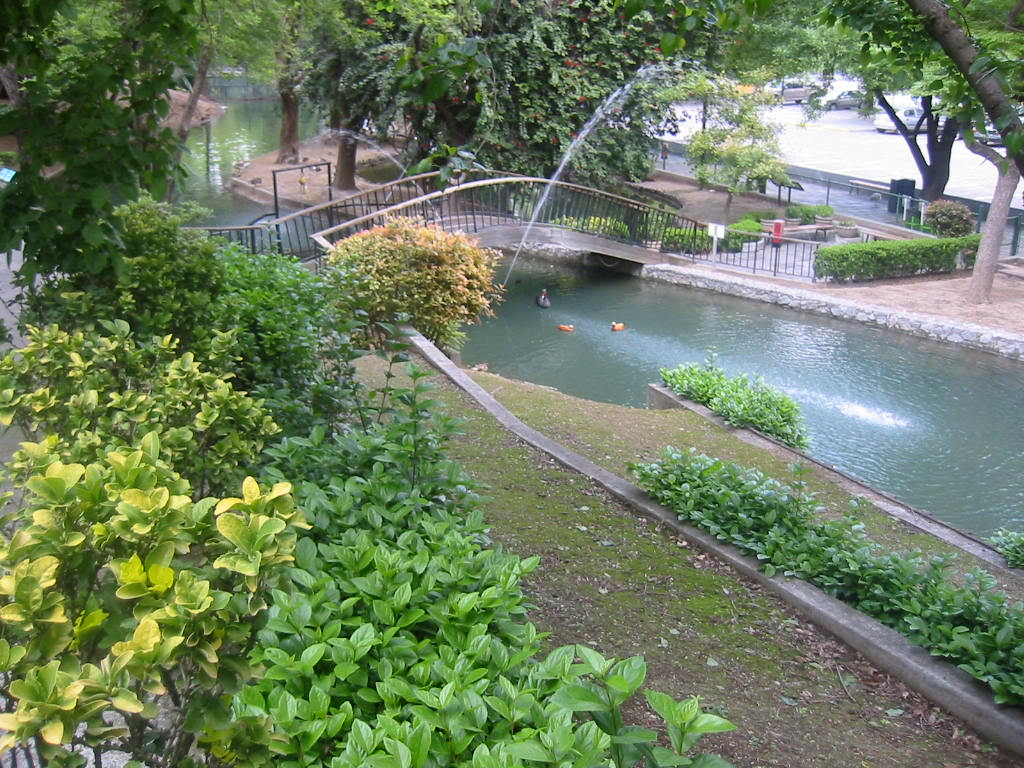
Aviary

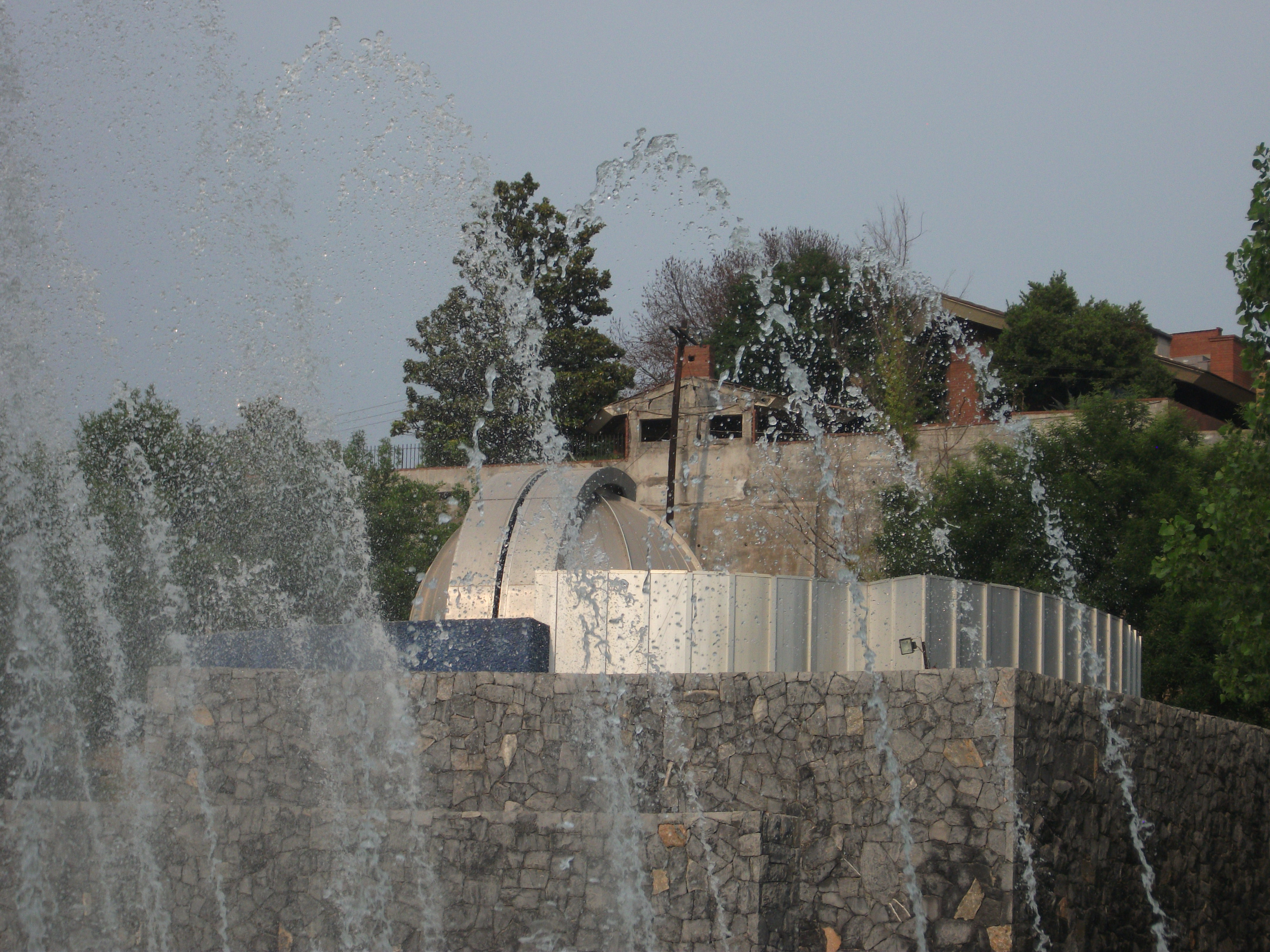
Observatory
