= Universidad UNIVER =

Private university in Mexico

The Universidad UNIVER is a private institution of education in Guadalajara, Jalisco, Mexico. It has 13 campuses in the Guadalajara metropolitan area.

== History ==
=== Early history ===
UNIVER was founded in 1955 by Jorge Ramírez y Martínez Sotomayor, one of the first architects to graduate from the Autonomous University of Guadalajara, and by the Sisters of Berryts, a Spanish Catholic community that brought to Mexico a new educational model focused on giving women the opportunity to obtain technical and other degrees.

Initially known as the Veracruz Institute (Instituto Veracruz), it later changed its name to the Veracruz Interior Design School (Escuela de Decoración Veracruz de Guadalajara), the second interior design program in the Guadalajara area following that of the Women's University of Guadalajara (Universidad Femenina de Guadalajara). Its first class had twelve female students.

The 1970s saw expansion as well as two moves to new campuses; additionally, the school received accreditation from the Secretariat of Public Education and support from Infonavit and the National Exterior Commerce Institute.

In 1976, the school became a technical college with bachillerato programs, and the religious sisters ended their involvement. Additionally, in 1984, the first undergraduate degree programs were offered.

The 1990s saw the expansion of the school to new facilities and corresponding rapid growth, with the school enrolling 1,200 students at the start of the 1990s and 12,000 by 1998. In 1996, UNIVER opened its first campus outside of the state of Jalisco, in downtown Tijuana. New campuses were opened in La Paz and Los Cabos in Baja California, Toluca and Ciudad Nezahualcóyotl in the State of Mexico (now a separate institution known as Univer Milenium), along with graduate programs in Morelia, additional facilities in the Guadalajara area designed for college programs.

=== Founding of graduate programs ===
Graduate programs were opened by 1999, in Guadalajara; that same year, UNIVER opened its campus in the city of Morelia, by agreement with the Sor Juana Inés de la Cruz College. In 1996, UNIVER started an exchange program for the training of its professors, with online Graduate programs, at the Catholic University of San Diego, in California.

== Programs ==
Universidad UNIVER offers undergraduate licenciatura degrees (equivalent to a bachelor's degree of the USA plus one extra year of graduate studies), accredited by the SEP, in the following majors:

- Business administration
- Tourism business administration
- Finance administration
- Political science and government
- External trade
- Accounting
- Accounting and finance
- Law
- Graphic design
- Gastronomy
- Computational systems engineering
- Architecture-civil engineering
- Industrial engineering
- Education
- Fashion design
- Information technology
- Administrative computer science
- Communication
