= Campofrío Food Group =

Spanish food processing company

Campofrío Food Group S.A.U.
- Formerly: Conservera Campofrío S.A. (1952–2003)
- Company type: Sociedad Anónima
- Traded as: BMAD: CFG
- Industry: Food processing
- Founded: 1952; 74 years ago
- Founder: José Luis Ballvé
- Headquarters: Alcobendas, Community of Madrid, Spain
- Area served: Europe, Canada and the United States
- Products: Deli meat, ethnic foods, pantry foods
- Revenue: ▲€ 1.630 billion (2010)
- Operating income: ▲€ 163 million (2010)
- Net income: ▲€ 40 million (2010)
- Owner: Sigma Alimentos
- Number of employees: 19,700 (2013)
- Website: www.campofriofoodgroup.com

The Campofrío Food Group S.A.U. (Spanish: Grupo de Alimentación Campofrío), formerly Conservera Campofrío S.A., simply known as Campofrío, is a prominent Spanish multinational food company based in Alcobendas, Spain. The company produces different kinds of processed meat products. The company was founded in Burgos by José Luis Ballvé in 1952.

== History ==
=== 1950s–1960s: The rise of Campofrío ===
José Luis Ballvé worked in a Seville slaughterhouse before becoming a traveling wool and hide buyer. His travels took him to Burgos and he decided to settle there, borrow 500€, and open a meat business. Ballvé handled the production side of the business and his partner, Romulo Fernando, handled the retail side. The two dissolved their partnership in 1952 so that Ballvé could start a complete meat packing operation on his own. He opened Conservera Campofrío S.A. in Burgos in an abandoned slaughterhouse building. By 1960, Campofrio increased production by starting its own cured meat products.

=== 1970s–1980s: Campofrío's big growth ===
In 1978, Ballvé decided to sell 50 percent of company to Beatrice Foods International, in which Campofrio wanted to expand outside Spain. In 1985, Pedro Ballvé takes over company after his father's death, before he went on to regain control of Campofrío from Beatrice Foods in 1987, and in 1988, Campofrío goes public on the Madrid Stock Exchange.

=== 1990s: The Campofrío phenomenon ===
In 1990, Campofrío began an international expansion with a subsidiary in France, followed by an opening of a plant in Moscow. A year later, in 1991, Campofrío formed the CampoMoc joint venture with Mosmia Soprom in Russia, followed by the launching of a subsidiary in Portugal. Campofrio also formed a joint venture with San Miguel Corporation in the Philippines under the name San Miguel CampoCarne Corporation, and in 1993, and entered Argentina through the CampoAustral joint venture.

In 1995, Campofrío got an ISO 9002 accreditation in all of its plants. In 1997, Hormel Foods acquired 21 percent of Campofrío, but in 1998, Campofrio acquired the Tabco and Morliny brands in Romania and Poland respectively. In 1999, Campofrío acquired the Montagne Noire brand in France, where it acquired Delicass as it entered the Pâté and prepared delicatessen foods sector that was sold in 2002.

=== 2000s–2010s: Campofrio continues to expand ===
Campofrío acquired the majority of Omsa in 2000 and merged with Navidul to solidify Spanish market leadership. However in 2001, Campofrío announced they had to exit the Latin American and Asian markets to focus on European growth. In 2002, Campofrío created the Primayor brand to take over the former Campocarne subsidiary and integrate its Omsa and Navidul operations.

In 2003, Campofrío prepared to continue its European expansion through a series of acquisitions. Campofrío's new dominance of the European market encouraged the company to focus its future expansion efforts in Western and Eastern Europe. In 2001, the company announced its intention to sell off its South American holdings. At the same time, Campofrío sold its share of the Philippine joint venture, San Miguel CampoCarne Corporation, to partner San Miguel Corporation and the joint venture was absorbed into San Miguel Pure Foods Company, Inc. (now San Miguel Food and Beverage).

By the end of 2003, Campofrío had completed its reorganization as a pan-European processed meat products company. The company's revenues now topped EUR 1.4 billion, and the company had succeeded in paying down much of the debt generated through the Omsa and Navidul acquisitions. Campofrío appeared in strong position to continue its international expansion into the new century.

In 2004, Smithfield Foods announced that they acquired 22.4% of the Campofrío Food Group. The Campofrio Food Group had finalized the partnership between Campofrío and Smithfield, in order to absorb the Smithfield brand into the Campofrío brand. Smithfield opened its European division with 6,500 employees in Paris. In 2011 Campofrío acquired the Italian sausage maker Cesare Fiorucci.

In May 2013, Smithfield Foods, Campofrio's principal stockholder, increased its share to 36.99%, after the latter was acquired by Shuanghui International Holdings of China for $7.100 million.

In November 2013, the Alfa Group of Mexico, along with Sigma Alimentos, took over 100% of Campofrio. Furthermore, more than 45% of its business came to the Ballvé family (12.4%), Oaktree (24.2%) and Caixabank (4.17%).

The advertisement shot for the 2014 advertising campaign was titled Bombería and featured Chus Lampreave, Santiago Segura, Chiquito de la Calzada and Fofito.

Again Icíar Bollaín directed the advertisement, in this case, the one corresponding to the 2015 campaign, entitled Awakenings and starring Emma Suárez and Tristán Ulloa.

Children of understanding was the title of the Christmas ad for 2016.

Isabel Coixet was in charge of directing the 2017 ad, which was titled Amodio, set in a psychiatric hospital and featured interventions by Carmen Maura, Joan Manuel Serrat, Baltasar Garzón, Risto Mejide, Candela Peña, Irene Villa, Ona Carbonell, David Broncano, Montserrat Domínguez and Dani Mateo.

The 2018 spot focuses on the idea that humor should not be a luxury, but rather a basic necessity, and recreates a luxury commercial establishment, where different doses of humor are sold. Starring Antonio de la Torre Martín, Silvia Abril and Belén Cuesta accompanied by David Broncano, Jaime Peñafiel, Enrique San Francisco, El Langui and Azúcar Moreno, among others.

In 2019 it was titled Fake Me and was directed by Daniel Sánchez Arévalo, being played by Javier Gutiérrez, Brays Efe, Yolanda Ramos, David Broncano, Susi Caramelo, Quique San Francisco, Iker Jiménez, Jordi Hurtado and Boris Izaguirre.

== Structure ==
The Campofrio Food Group operates various brands of processed meats all over Europe and the Americas, among them:

- Groupe Aoste (France)
- Campofrío (Spain)
- Campofrío Food Group America (USA)
- CFG Deutschland (Germany)
- Cesare Fiorucci (Italy)
- Imperial Meat Products (Belgium)
- Nobre (Portugal)
- Stegeman (Netherlands)
- Caroli (Romania): from the Caroli Foods Group
- Weight Watchers: under licence
- Disney (under Imperial Meat Products)

== See also ==
- List of food companies
