= Alestra =

Mexican IT services company

Alestra S. de R.L. de C.V.
- Company type: Subsidiary
- Industry: IT Services
- Founded: 1995; 31 years ago
- Headquarters: San Pedro Garza García, Mexico, Mexico
- Area served: Mexico
- Key people: Armando Garza Sada (chairman); Rolando Zubirán Shetler (CEO)
- Products: ERP Cloud, Smart Mobility, Enterprise C-Computing
- Revenue: ▲US$ 415 million (2014)
- Net income: US$ 103 million (2014)
- Total assets: ▲US$ 628 million (2014)
- Number of employees: 1,800
- Parent: Alfa
- Website: www.alestra.mx

Alestra S. de R.L. de C.V., known as Alestra, is a Mexican IT Services company headquartered in San Pedro Garza García, Nuevo León, Mexico. It provides IT solutions for the corporate sector in Mexico. It is a subsidiary of the Mexican conglomerate Alfa.

Alestra reported revenues of $415 million for 2014. It employs more than 1,600 people and operates five data centers, 3 in Monterrey, 1 in Guadalajara, and 1 in Querétaro.

In 2011, its parent company, Alfa, acquired 49% of Alestra's shares from AT&T.

In January 2016, Alestra (through its parent company Alfa) bought Axtel.
