= CAFFENIO =

Mexican coffeehouse chain

- Founder: Don Jose Diaz
- Headquarters: Hermosillo, Mexico
- Number of locations: 200+
- Area served: Mexico, United States & Latin America
- Brands: Andatti
- Website: https://caffenio.com/

Caffenio (stylized as CAFFENIO) is a Mexican chain of drive-through Coffeehouses that was founded and is currently headquartered in Hermosillo, Sonora. The chain can trace back its origins to 1923, by a man named Don Jose Diaz who started the first operations of the small chain in the city of Chihuahua.

== History ==
In 1941, the coffee chain was officially established under the name of "Café del Pacífico, S.A. de C.V." and after five years, the first coffee bean roasting plant was inaugurated in 1946. The company continued to expand, and in 1972 it began to export its coffee to the United States. In 1980, the first plant of instant coffee was inaugurated, which signified the necessity to appeal to different sectors of the market. In 2000, it launched the product Kfreeze followed by a new concept named "Estación Café" where the sale of individually prepared coffees in cups would be sold to customers. 2004 brought the creation of Andatti which it would be sold in the stores of OXXO. In 2007, the chain began to renovate its image, and the name CAFFENIO was adopted.

== Areas Served ==
CAFFENIO has over 200 locations throughout Mexico. In 2023 it was announced that CAFFENIO would open its first U.S. store in Mesa, Arizona sometime during 2024 accompanied with future plans to expand to neighboring states in the Southwestern United States.
