= Oxxo =

Mexican chain of convenience stores

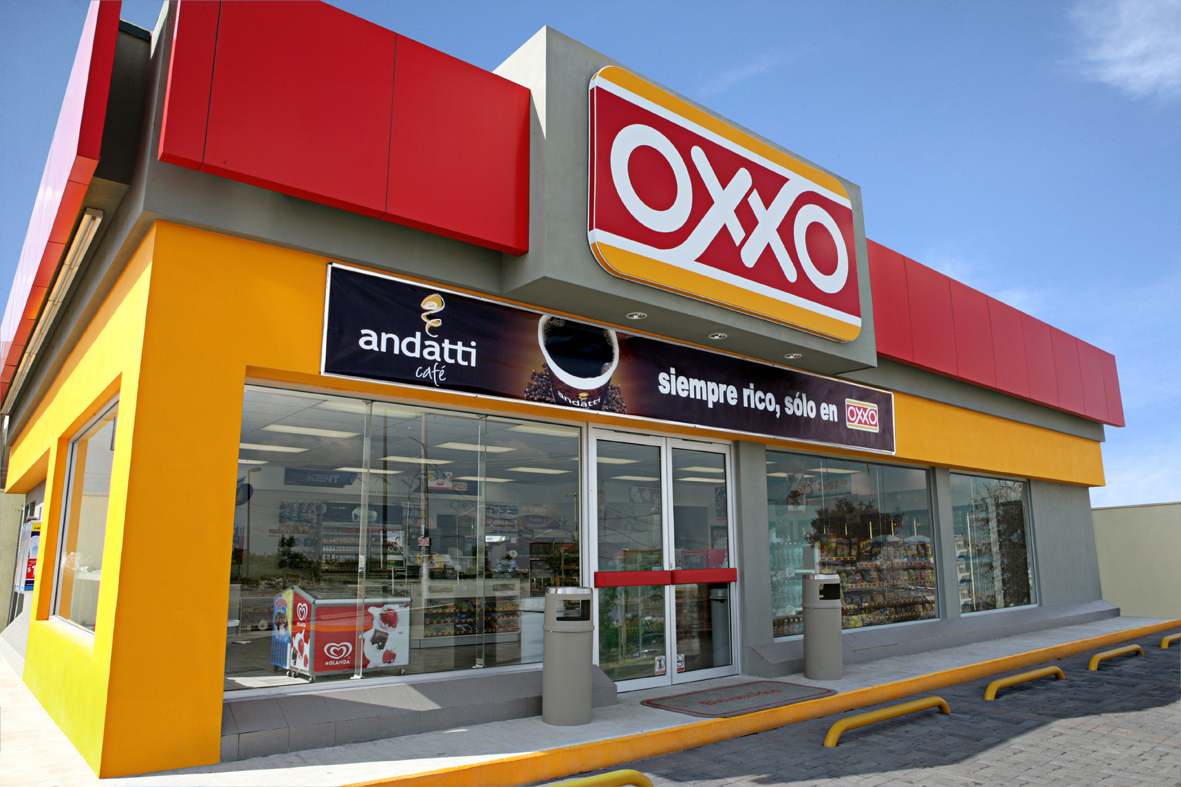
- Type: Subsidiary
- Industry: Convenience stores, filling stations
- Founded: 1977; 49 years ago
- Headquarters: Monterrey, Nuevo León, Mexico
- Number of locations: 21,706
- Area served: Mexico; Brazil; Chile; Colombia; Central America; Peru; United States
- Number of employees: 140,000+
- Parent: FEMSA
- Website: www.oxxo.com

Oxxo (Spanish pronunciation: [ˈokso]; stylized as OXXO) is a Mexican chain of convenience stores and gas stations. With over 21,000 stores across the Americas and parts of Europe, it is the largest chain of convenience stores in Latin America. Its headquarters is in Monterrey, Nuevo León.

It is wholly owned by the beverage company FEMSA (Fomento Económico Mexicano).

== History ==
Oxxo was founded in Guadalupe, Nuevo León, in 1976. In the first stores, the only products sold were beer, snacks, and cigarettes. The success of the stores was such that the project kept growing and Oxxo built new locations rapidly, becoming ubiquitous in Mexican cities and towns.

The first official Oxxo store was opened in 1979 in Guadalupe, Nuevo León. Oxxo stores then spread to Chihuahua, Hermosillo, and Nuevo Laredo. Throughout the eighties, Oxxo gained fame in the cities where it was established. In 1998, the 1,000th store was opened. On July 6, 2010, the opening of the 9,000th store, in Oaxaca, was announced. With Mexico gradually liberalizing its oil and gas market since 2013, Oxxo has started to open gas stations as well. The first station opened in San Pedro Garza Garcia. In 2019, Oxxo Gas aimed to rebrand 49 additional stations, mostly in Monterrey, that were operating under the Pemex name.

As of 2014, Oxxo was reported to have more than 15,000 stores across Mexico, making it the country's largest convenience store chain. In the same year, a partnership between Oxxo and Amazon was announced, involving Amazon accepting Oxxo's prepaid debit cards as a payment method, and Amazon gift cards being sold at Oxxo stores.

The drive-through coffeehouse chain Caffenio sells andatti coffee (usually only found in Oxxo stores throughout Mexico) as a partnership deal between Oxxo and Caffenio.

=== International expansion ===
Oxxo first expanded overseas into Colombia when it opened its first store there in 2009.

The Oxxo brand first attempted to expand into the United States starting in 2014, with ambitions to open up to 900 stores over the next ten years. It resulted in two stores opening near the Mexico–United States border: in Eagle Pass, Texas as a “proof-of-concept” store, which has since closed, and Laredo, Texas, a location that opened in 2015 and was the sole remaining U.S. store still in operation until later U.S. expansion efforts.

In February 2015, Oxxo opened its first convenience store in Lima, Peru.

Oxxo acquired the Chilean convenience store chain Big John in mid-2016 and subsequently renamed all its stores to the Oxxo brand.

In December 2020, the first Oxxo store in Brazil opened under FEMSA's joint venture with Brazilian energy company Raízen.

On August 1, 2024, FEMSA announced plans to acquire 249 DK convenience stores in the U.S. states of Texas, New Mexico, and Arkansas from parent company Delek US Holdings, Inc. for $385 million. The acquisition was completed in October 2024. Initially, FEMSA had not revealed any immediate plans to rebrand the DK stores to Oxxo. However, the DK brand will remain for its fuel stations. In February 2025, the rebranding process began, starting in the Midland–Odessa area of West Texas with a store in Odessa on February 26.

== Gallery ==
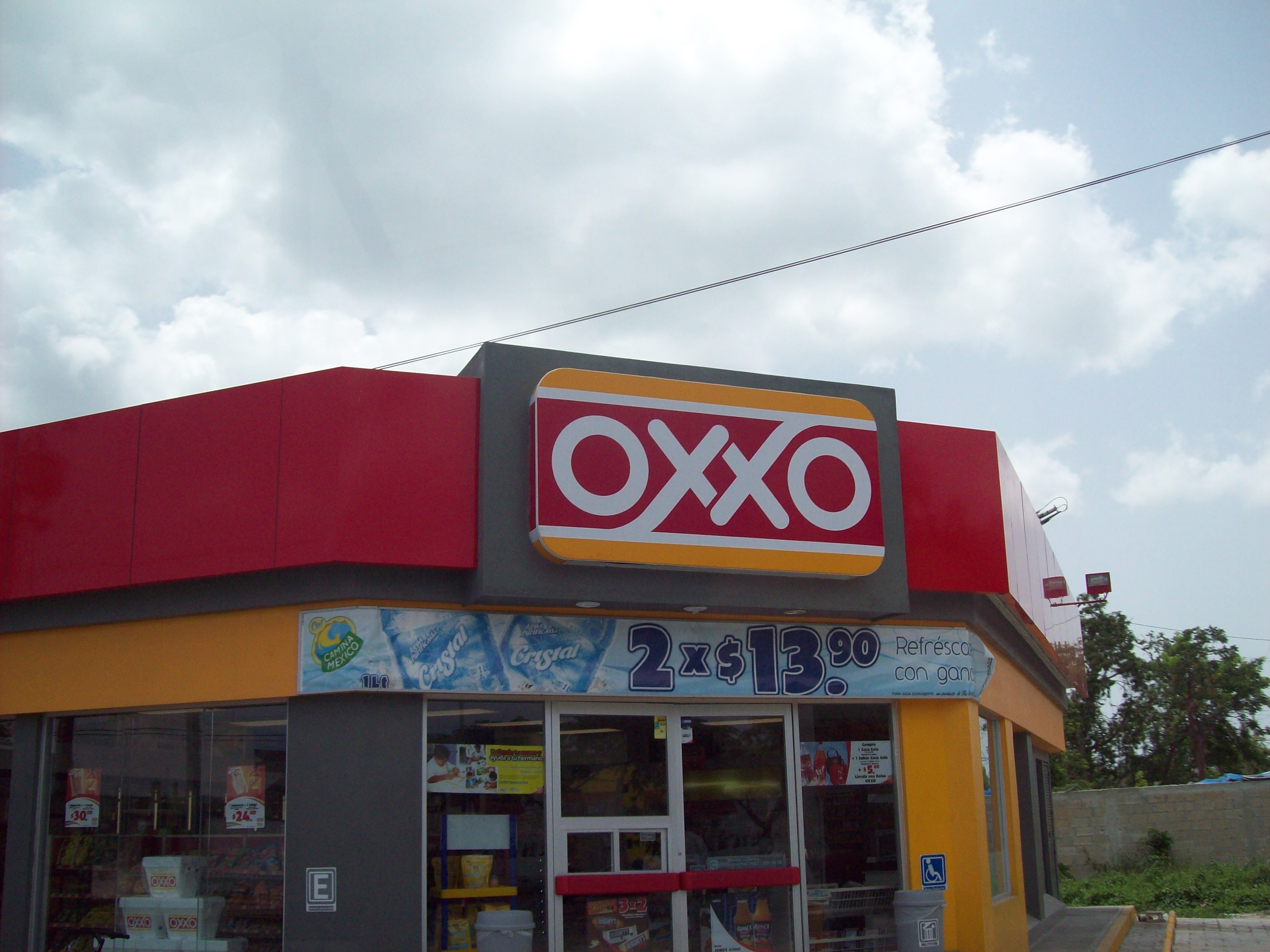
OXXO store in San Miguel de Cozumel, Quintana Roo

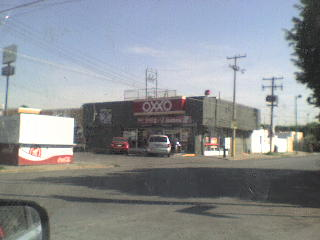
OXXO store in Gomez Palacio, Durango

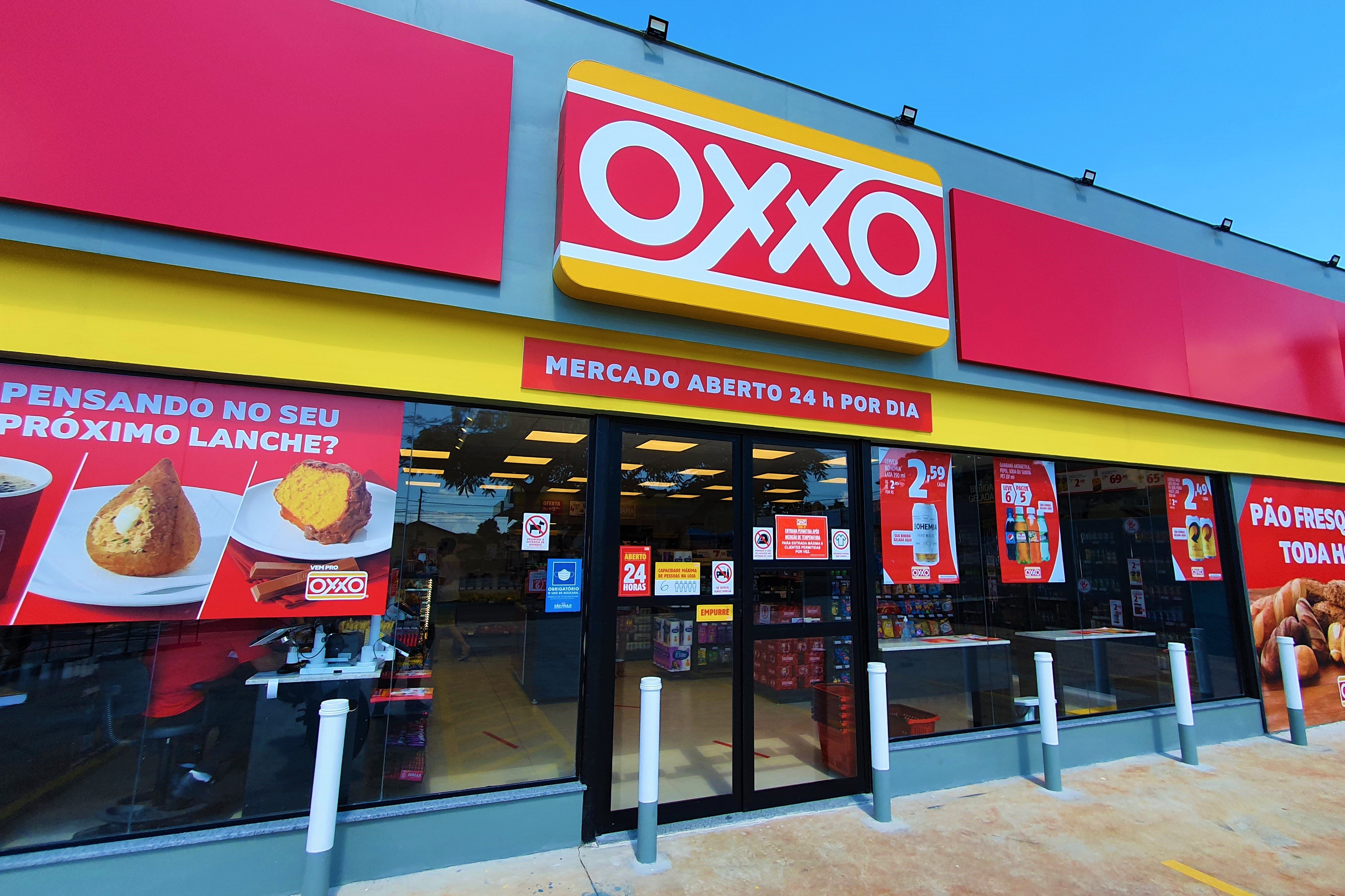
OXXO store in Campinas, São Paulo, Brazil

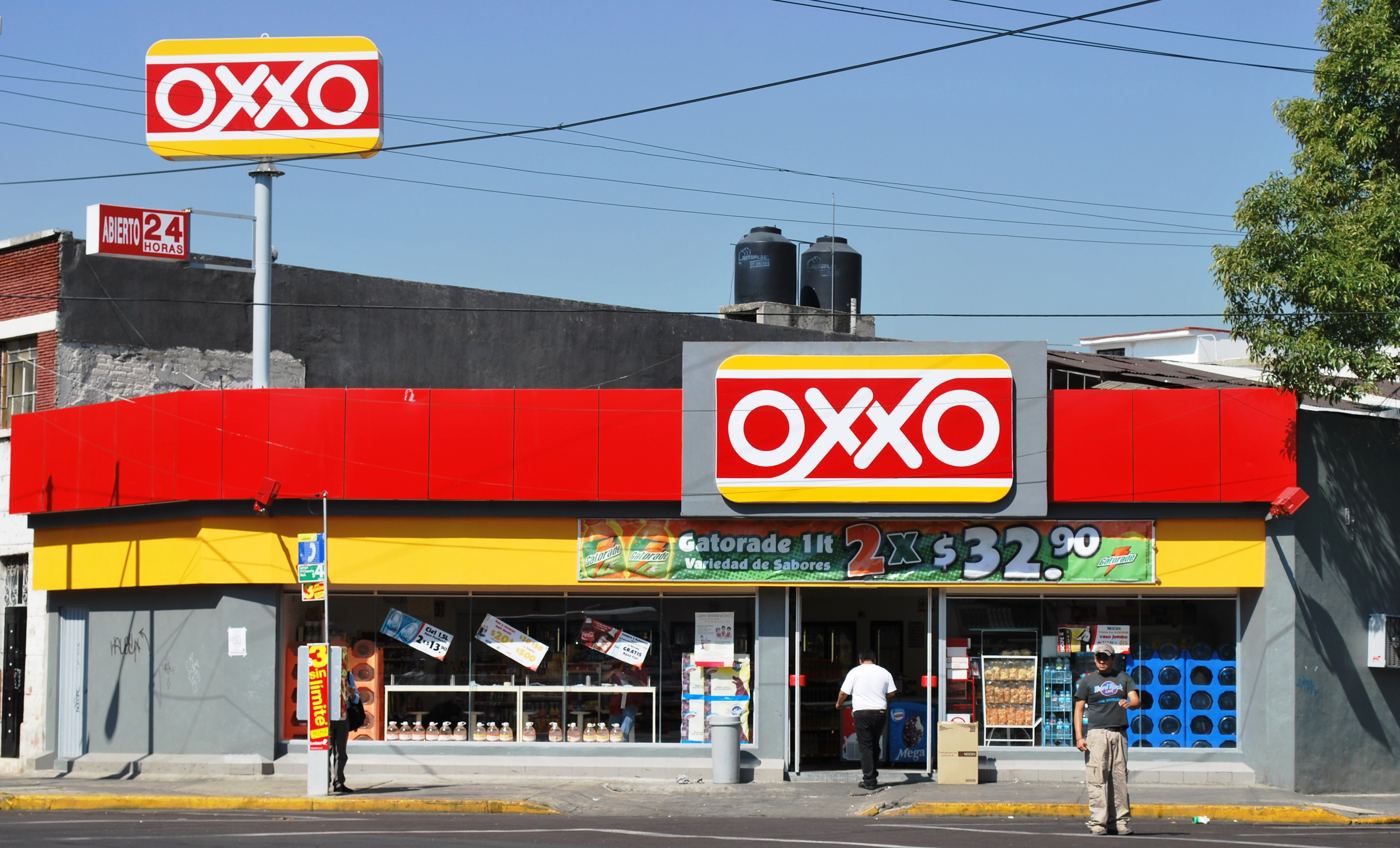
OXXO store in Mexico City

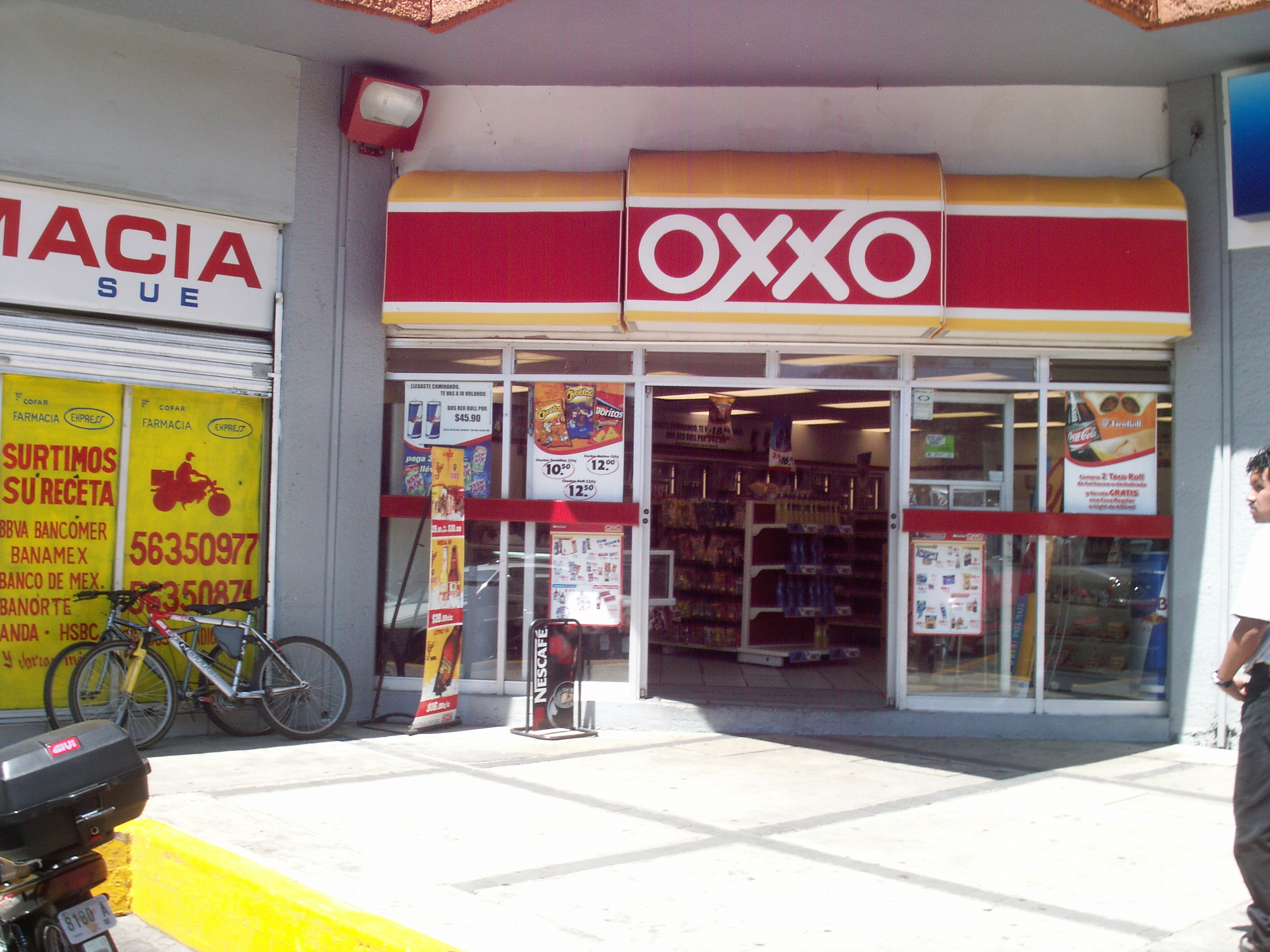
Another OXXO store in Mexico City

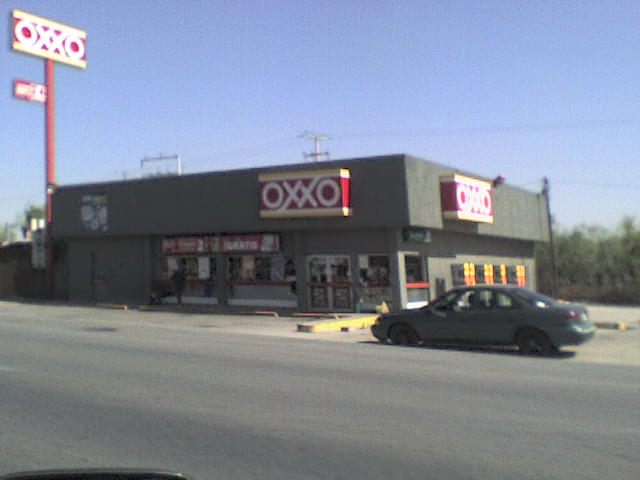
OXXO store in Gómez Palacio, Durango

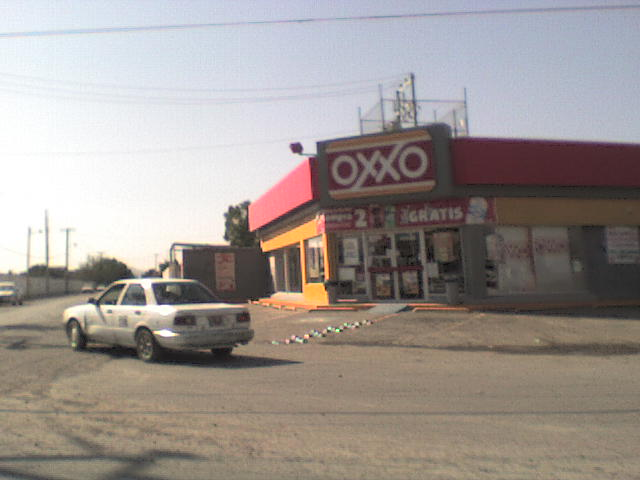
OXXO store in Gómez Palacio, Durango

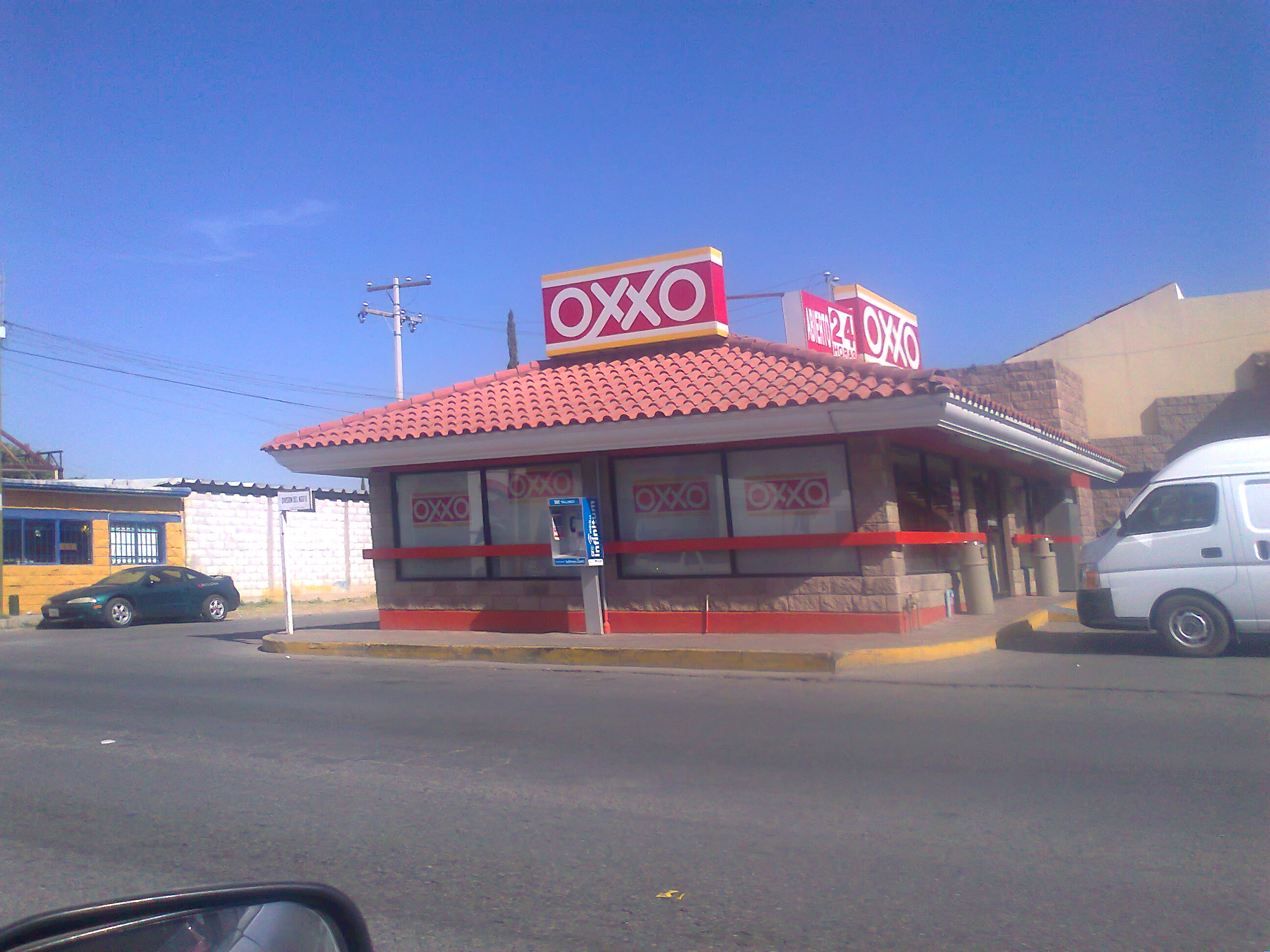
OXXO store in Torreon, Coahuila

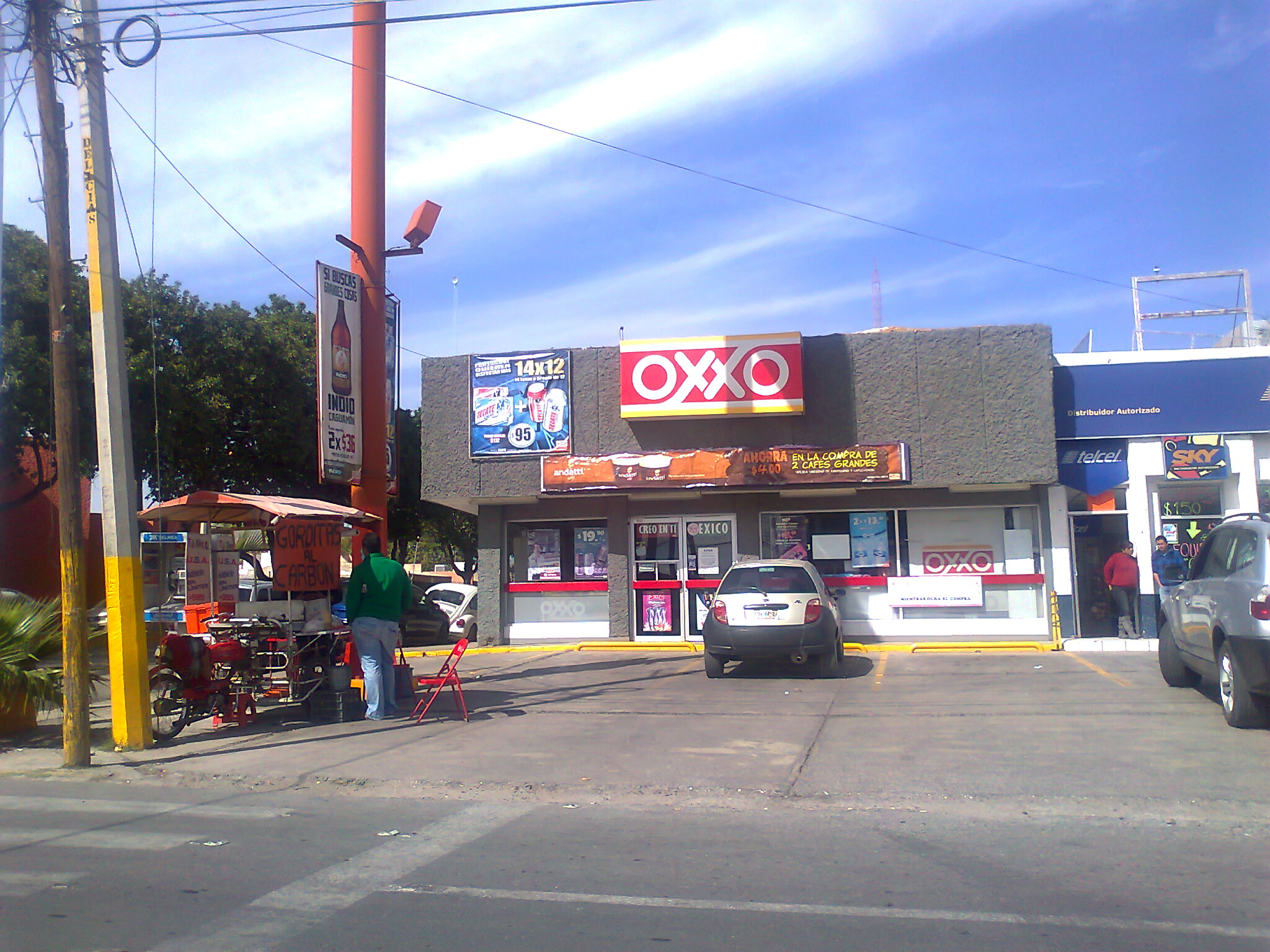
Another OXXO store in Torreon, Coahuila

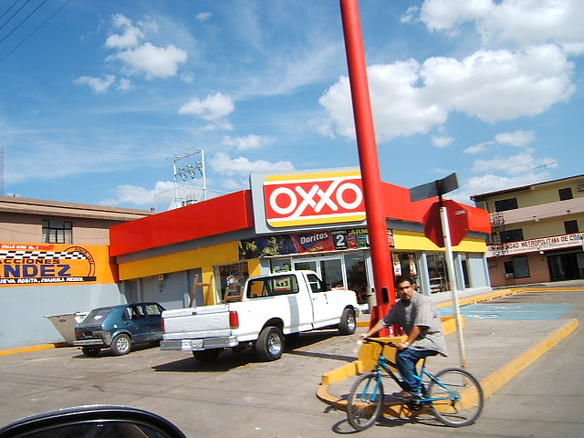
OXXO store in Nueva Rosita, Coahuila

== See also ==
- Convenience stores
- List of companies of Mexico
