= Videxport =

- Videxport logo
- Company type: Privately held company
- Traded as: Videxport, S.A. de C.V.
- Industry: Agriculture
- Founded: 1975; 51 years ago in Hermosillo, Mexico
- Founder: Gilberto Salazar Serrano
- Headquarters: Hermosillo, Mexico
- Area served: Worldwide
- Key people: Gilberto Salazar Escoboza
- Products: Table grapes Watermelons; Pecans
- Owner: Gilberto Salazar Escoboza
- Subsidiaries: Empacadora Frutícola Santa Inés, S.A. de C.V.
- Website: videxport.com.mx

Videxport, S.A. de C.V., founded in 1975 by Gilberto Salazar Serrano in Hermosillo, Mexico, specializes in producing and exporting table grapes, watermelons, and bell peppers. The company operates over 3,000 hectares (7,400 acres) and primarily exports to the U.S., Canada, and England, maintaining high standards with certifications like PrimusGFS and Fair Trade.

== Products ==
The company specializes in growing, packaging, and shipping table grapes, watermelons, pecans, and bell peppers. The majority of the production, apart from distributing their products locally, is distributed to markets in the United States, Canada, England, and Asia.

== Food safety ==
After the Food and Drug Administration and Mexico's Federal Commission for the Protection from Sanitary Risks (COFEPRIS) and its National Service for Agro-Alimentary Public Health, Safety and Quality (SENASICA) signed a statement of intent that formed a partnership among the three organizations in July 2014, agricultural business owners made it their commitment to not only meet, but to exceed the more stringent food safety standards.

Government agencies in both Mexico and the U.S. now issue GAPs, or guidelines to good agricultural practices, for the production and distribution of specific crops and agricultural products. Videxport and Empacadora Frutícola Santa Inés, the packaging arm of the company, work proactively to maintain food safety and integrity.

== Certification ==
The companies have received inspection and certification by a number of bodies, including:

- PrimusGSF
- Mexico Supreme Quality
- Customs-Trade Partnership Against Terrorism (C-TPAT)
- Fair Trade

== Legal issues ==
Salazar has faced multiple legal proceedings in Mexico and the United States:

- In 2012, he was convicted in the U.S. for making a false statement to a financial institution in connection with a loan backed by the U.S. Export-Import Bank (Ex-Im Bank).
- In Mexico, he has been accused of fraud in various civil and criminal cases, including proceedings in Ciudad Obregón and Tijuana. He has filed for amparos (injunctions) to avoid asset seizures and arrest warrants.

== Controversies ==
Several Mexican media outlets have reported alleged ties to political and financial influence networks. While no definitive public evidence links him directly to organized crime, his name has appeared in high-profile legal disputes.

Additionally, Videxport has been accused by local suppliers of engaging in abusive commercial practices, allegedly driving many smaller agricultural providers and subcontractors into bankruptcy through non-payment or exploitative contracts.

Gilberto Salazar Escoboza and his companies belong to several associations related to the agricultural community in Mexico, including:

- Asociación Agrícola Local de Productores de Uva de Mesa (AALPUM)
- Asociación Agrícola Local de Productores de Hortalizas, Frutas y Legumbres de Hermosillo, A.C.
- Asociación de Usuarios del Distrito de Riego 051, Costa de Hermosillo, A.C.
- Productora de Nuez S.P.R. de R.I
- Asociación de Productores de Hortalizas del Valle de Guaymas y Empalme
- Asociación de Organismos de Agricultores del Norte de Sonora (AOANS)
- Asociación de Productores Agrícolas de Sonora (APAS)

== See also ==
- List of companies of Mexico
