= David Penchyna Grub =

Mexican politician

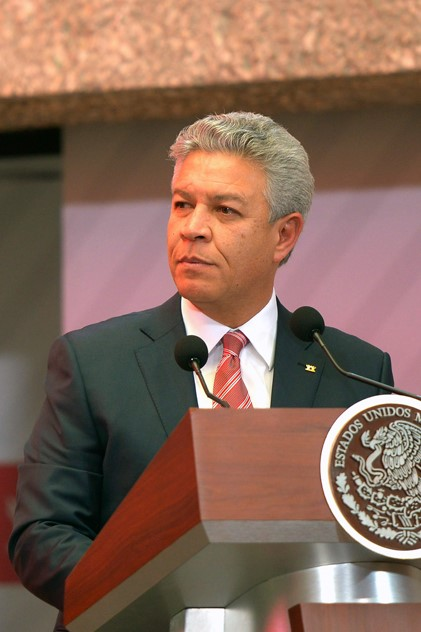
- Penchyna in 2017

Director-General of INFONAVIT
- In office December 2015 – December 2018
- President: Enrique Peña Nieto
- Preceded by: Alejandro Murat Hinojosa

Personal details
- Born: 10 March 1965 (age 61) Pachuca, Hidalgo, Mexico
- Party: PRI
- Education: National Autonomous University of Mexico
- Occupation: Politician

David Penchyna Grub (born 10 March 1965) is a Mexican politician affiliated with the Institutional Revolutionary Party (PRI).

In 2012–2015 Penchyna served as a Senator in the 62nd Congress, representing Hidalgo. He also served as a federal deputy during two legislatures: between 2000 and 2003, for Hidalgo's third district, and again from 2009 to 2012, for Hidalgo's fourth district.

From 2015 to 2018, during the presidency of Enrique Peña Nieto, he was the director-general of the Institute of the National Housing Fund for Workers (INFONAVIT).
