= Nemak =

Global automotive parts manufacturing company

Nemak, S.A.B. de C.V.
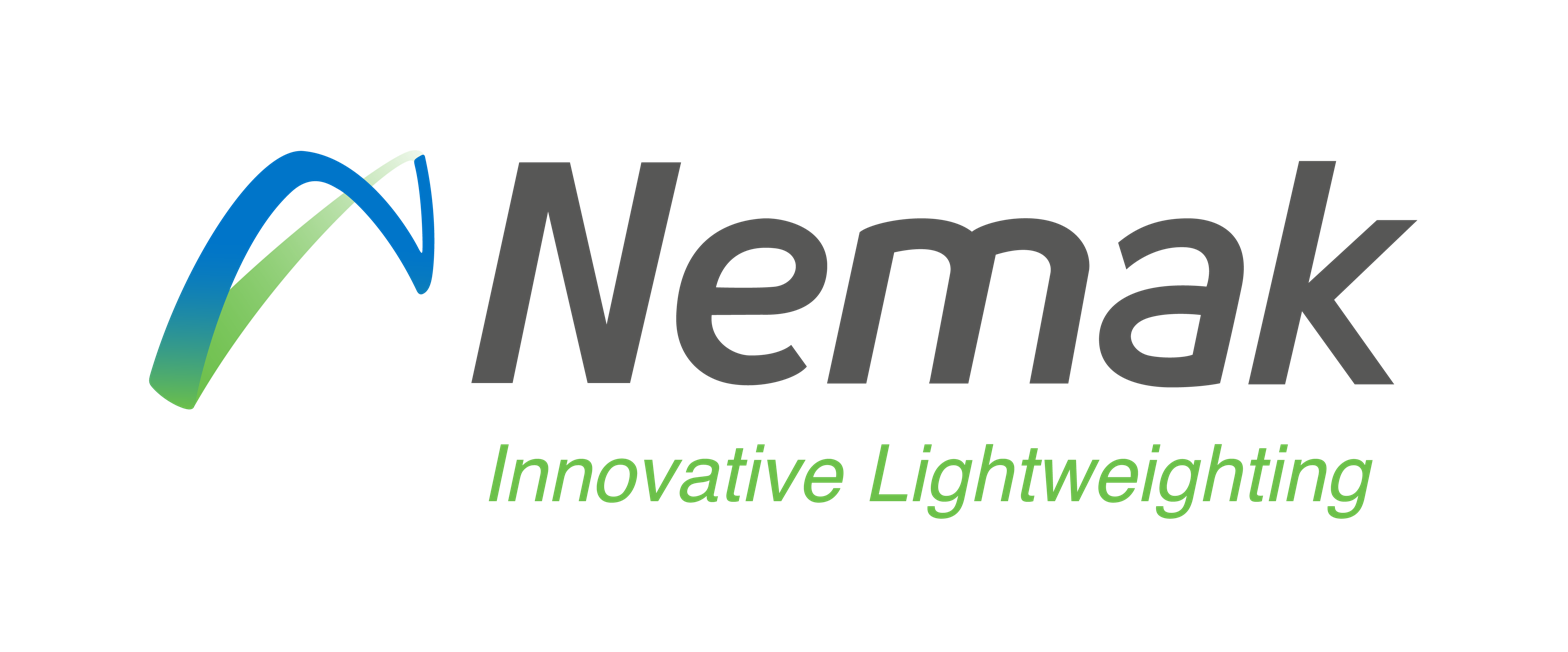
- Company type: Public
- Traded as: BMV: NEMAK A
- Industry: Auto Parts Manufacturing
- Founded: 1879; 147 years ago
- Headquarters: Monterrey, Nuevo León, Mexico
- Area served: Worldwide
- Key people: Armando Garza (chairman); Armando Tamez (CEO)
- Products: engine blocks, cylinder heads, transmission components, EV battery and motor housings
- Revenue: ▲US$ 4.6 billion (2014)
- Net income: ▲US$ 405 million (2014)
- Total assets: ▲US$ 4.0 million (2014)
- Number of employees: 20,000
- Parent: Alfa
- Website: www.nemak.com

Nemak, S.A.B. de C.V., known as Nemak, is a global automotive parts manufacturing company headquartered in García, Nuevo León, a municipality next to the City of Monterrey, Nuevo León, México. The company manufactures a wide range of automotive parts and systems with primary focus on aluminum auto parts, mainly engine blocks, cylinder heads, and transmission components. It is a Tier 1 supplier to major OEMs and is among the 60 largest auto industry suppliers worldwide.

In 2012, the company acquired Wisconsin-based J.L. French Automotive Castings for $215 million.

Nemak reported sales of $4.3 billion for 2016 and has more than 36 manufacturing plants that employ more than 21,000 people in 16 countries. It has more than 110 patents and conducts R&D in 5 centers. More than 90% of the sales volume was supplied to the 8 largest automotive manufacturers: Ford, General Motors, Fiat-Chrysler, Volkswagen Group, Hyundai-Kia, BMW, Renault-Nissan and Daimler-Benz. Its installed capacity is mainly in North America, where the company has 10 plants in Mexico, 6 in the United States, and 1 in Canada. The remaining plants are located in Europe, in Austria, Czech Republic, Germany, Hungary, Russia, Slovakia, Spain, and Poland; in South America, in Argentina and Brazil; and in Asia, in China and India.

Nemak is a subsidiary of the Mexican industrial conglomerate Alfa, which holds 75.24% of Nemak shares, while Ford Motor Co. holds 5.45% of the shares and the remaining 19.31% are public shares offered in the BMV.

In early 2015, Nemak´s parent company, Alfa, announced it may hold an initial public offering to list Nemak in the Mexican Stock Exchange as soon as June, as a strong U.S. dollar boosts the value of the division’s assets.

In 2021, Nemak was awarded a contract with Tesla and expanded its manufacturing facilities in Sheboygan, Wisconsin. The company had previously turned down a request from Tesla in 2018.
