= Softtek =

Mexican technology company

- Company type: Privately held
- Industry: Information technology services
- Founded: 1982; 44 years ago in Monterrey, Nuevo León, Mexico
- Founder: Blanca Treviño
- Headquarters: Monterrey, Nuevo León, Mexico
- Key people: Blanca Treviño (Executive President & Chairperson); David Jiménez (CEO-designate); Benigno López (USA); Miguel Saldivar (Brazil); Carlos Funes (Mexico & Central America); Roberto Montelongo (Chief Operating Officer)
- Number of employees: 15000 (2019)
- Website: www.softtek.com

Softtek is a Mexico-based information technology company, operating in North America, Latin America, Europe and Asia. Headquartered in Monterrey, Mexico, the company has 15,000 associates in Mexico and abroad and is the largest private IT vendor in Latin America. The company offers application software development, testing, security and support; business process outsourcing (BPO); and IT infrastructure management, security and support to more than 400 corporations in more than 20 countries. It also acts as a value added reseller (VAR) for SAP, Microsoft, Blue Yonder, AWS and other software products. The company has trademarked the term "nearshoring" to describe the provision of outsourced services to customers in other countries that are in proximity.

== History ==
Softtek was founded in 1982 as a small IT services company by Gerardo López, developing customized software for customers including Mexico’s second largest bank and managing their IT infrastructure. Following the passage of the North American Free Trade Agreement (NAFTA) in 1994, in 1997 Softtek introduced the nearshore model, opening the first global delivery center in Latin America. In August 2000, Blanca Treviño took the position of President and CEO. She will hold the role until October 2026, when David Jiménez will be appointed Global CEO and Treviño will become Executive President and continue as President of the Board of Directors. In August 2007, the company acquired China based I.T. UNITED, extending its services to the Asian market. In December 2019, Softtek acquired 75% of Vector ITC, Spain-based digital technology services firm.

== Management ==
Blanca Treviño assumed the position of President and CEO of Softtek in August 2000 and led the company for 26 years. Under her leadership, Softtek became the largest private IT service provider in Latin America. She is a board member for Wal-Mart Mexico, The United States – Mexico Foundation for Science, the University of Monterrey, and TecMilenio University. She is also an adviser to the Government of Nuevo León, her home state in Mexico. She was featured as a “Rising Star” in 2007 by Fortune Magazine’s "50 most powerful women in global business" issue. Treviño was also selected as the fourth most powerful business woman in Mexico by CNN Expansión in 2008, which was her second time featured in this ranking. In 2019, WITI inducted Blanca into the Women in Technology Hall of Fame.

In October 2026, David Jiménez will be appointed Global CEO of Softtek, while Treviño will become Executive President and continue as President of the Board of Directors.

== Controversy ==
On May 31, 2020, in the midst of the commotion by the worldwide Black Lives Matter movement, the Brazilian affiliate was involved in accusations of racism on social networks after firing an employee who led the movement in Brazil. In response, Softtek said: "our human resources policies comply with regulations and are in line with our code of ethics"

== Acquisitions ==
Company acquired	Country	Date	Business	Reference
Vector ITC	Spain	December 2019	Digital Services	
Itarvi Consulting	Spain	August 2015	Multichannel Banking Services	
Systech Integrators	India (United States) US	February 2013	SAP® Channel and Services Partner	
SCAi	Mexico	August 2012	SAP	
I.T. United	China	August 2007	SAP	
Aveshka	(United States) USA	November 2022	Government Contractor	
