= Instituto del Fondo Nacional de la Vivienda para los Trabajadores =

Worker's housing institute in Mexico

Infonavit
- Instituto del Fondo Nacional de la Vivienda para los Trabajadores
- Infonavit logo

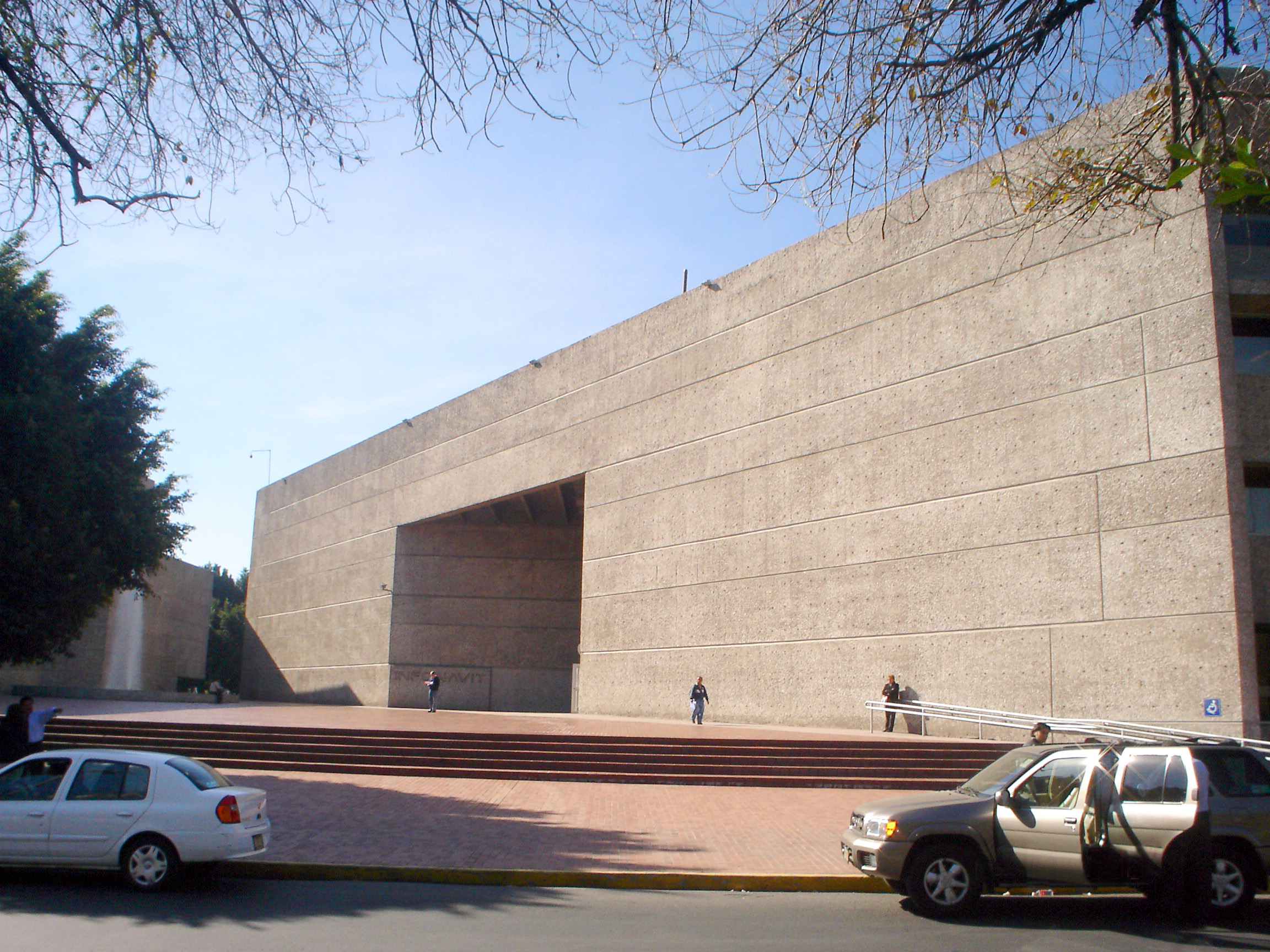
- Central offices of the Institute of the National Housing Fund for Workers in Mexico City
- Formation: 1972-04-21
- Founder: Luis Echeverría Álvarez
- Type: State-owned enterprise
- Headquarters: Álvaro Obregón, Ciudad de México
- Region served: Mexico
- Products: Credit products for worker's housing
- Services: Real estate mortgages
- Official language: Spanish
- Owner: Mexico
- Director general: Octavio Romero Oropeza
- Chair (officer): Rogelio Ramírez de la O
- Website: https://portalmx.infonavit.org.mx/

The Institute of the National Housing Fund for Workers (Spanish: Instituto del Fondo Nacional de la Vivienda para los Trabajadores; INFONAVIT) is the Mexican federal institute for worker's housing, founded in 1972, and located at Barranca del Muerto 280, in Mexico City.

It is the largest mortgage lender in Latin America and the fourth worldwide, with over 12 million mortgages on its books and a new one added every 53 seconds. The reform and expansion of Infonavit led to a transformation of the housing production system in Mexico, whereby more houses are now built by developers and purchased with a mortgage than through a self-build process, and it enabled the growth of several national homebuilding firms such as Casas GEO, Homex and Consorcio Ara.

Infonavit receives 5% of all formal workers salaries and provides a series of housing-related mortgage products. These include a mortgage to buy a new or existing home, a mortgage to remodel a home or a mortgage to build a new home.

== Directors-general ==
- Jesús Silva-Herzog Flores (1972–1976)
- José Campillo Sainz (1976–1988)
- Emilio Gamboa Patrón (1988–1991)
- Gonzalo Martínez Corbalá (1991 – 1991)
- José Juan de Olloqui y Labastida (1991–1993)
- José Francisco Ruiz Massieu (1993–1994)
- Alfredo Phillips Olmedo (1994 – 1994)
- Arturo Núñez Jiménez (1994–1995)
- Alfredo del Mazo González (1995–1997)
- Óscar Joffre Velázquez (1997–1998)
- Luis de Pablo Serna (1998–2001)
- Víctor Manuel Borrás Setién (2001–2012)
- Alejandro Murat Hinojosa (2012–2015)
- David Penchyna Grub (2015–2018)
- Carlos Martínez Velázquez (2018–present)
