= Panam (brand) =

Mexican footwear brand

GRUPO PANAM DE MÉXICO S.A. DE C.V.
- Industry: Footwear
- Founded: 1962; 64 years ago in Naucalpan, Mexico
- Headquarters: Mexico City
- Products: Sneakers
- Website: panam.com.mx

Panam is a Mexican footwear brand founded in 1962. It is one of the oldest footwear companies that originated Mexico.

== History ==
The company was created by the Melem and Pérez families who wanted to create a brand that would provide affordable shoes for the country. The company was named Producto Auténtico Nacional Mexicano, Panam for short, and built its first factory in Naucalpan in the state of Mexico. After a fire burned down its first factory, the company decided to build a new factory in Cuautitlán Izcalli.

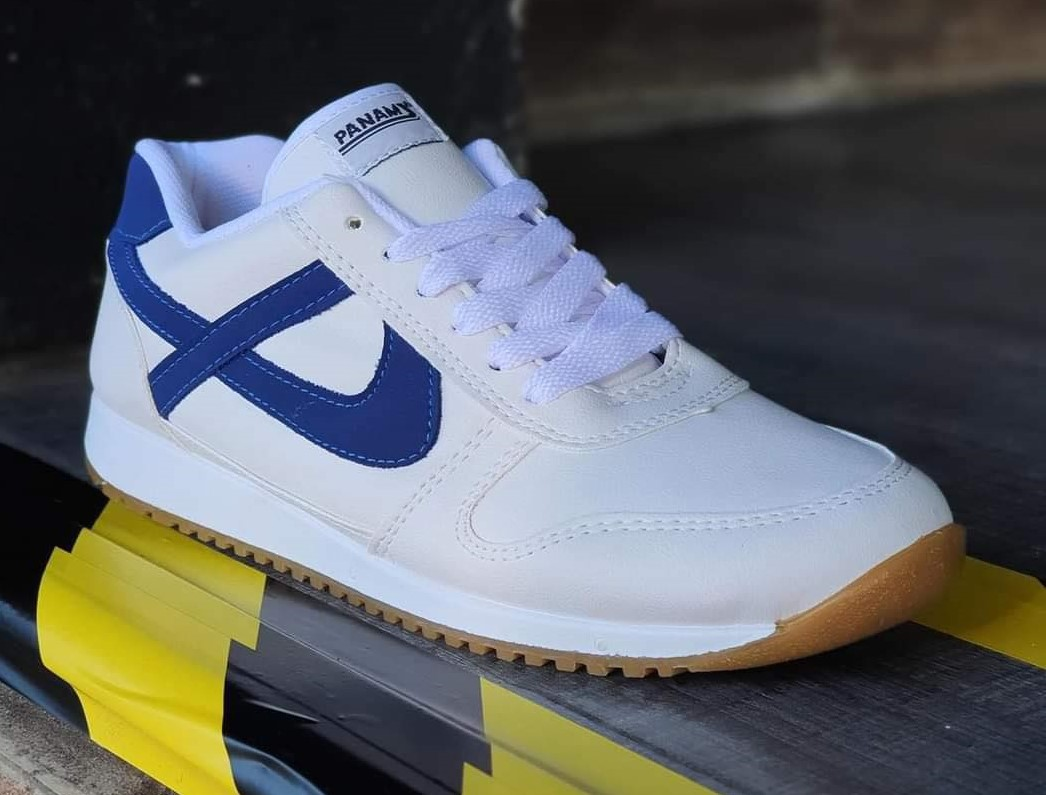
A white and blue pair of Panam 0319 sneakers

In 1967, the company launched the Panam 084. It was released in a blue and white colorway that the company referred to as Campeón. It was the first shoe to introduce the "P" logo which has since been used on all of the company's shoes. The shoe became popular among school students for use during recreational activities in the 1970s and 1980s.

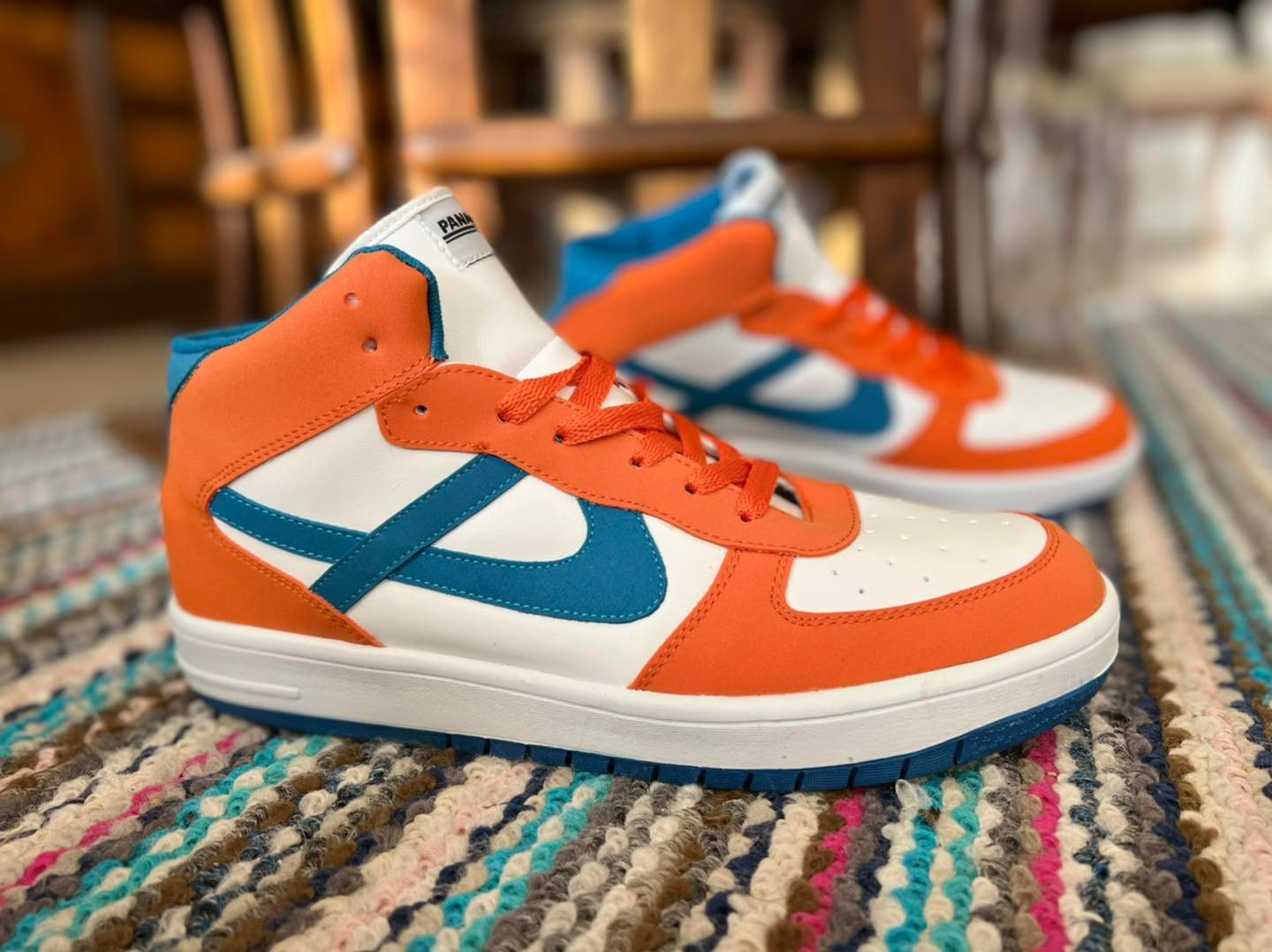
A pair of Panam Bota Meztli shoes

In November 2019, the company expanded its business and created a clothing line to sell alongside their footwear. The company has expanded into neighboring countries and has opened stores in Guatemala, Belize, and the United States.
