= Sigma Alimentos =

Mexican food processing company

Sigma Alimentos, S.A. de C.V.
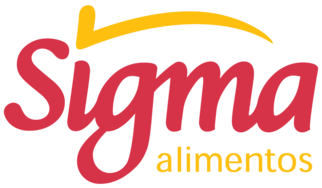
- Company type: Subsidiary
- Industry: Food processing, refrigerated distribution
- Founded: 1980; 46 years ago
- Headquarters: San Pedro Garza García, Mexico
- Area served: Americas and Eurozone
- Key people: Armando Garza (chairman); Rodrigo Fernandez (CEO)
- Products: lunch meats, cheeses, yogurts, prepared meals, beverages
- Brands: Lunch Meats; Fud, San Rafael, Chimex, Tangamanga, Bernina, Hidalmex, San Antonio, Bar-S, Campofrío, Longmont; Yogurts; Yoplait, Yopli, Chen; Cheeses; Fud, La Villita, Nochebuena, Chen, Camelia, Franja; Other; Café Olé, Guten, El Cazo, Nobre, Norteñita, Eugenia
- Revenue: ▲US$ 6.9 billion (2021)
- Net income: ▲US$ 57.4 million (2021)
- Number of employees: 45,000 (2018)
- Parent: Alfa
- Website: www.sigma-alimentos.com

Sigma Alimentos, S.A. de C.V., also known as Sigma or Sigma Alimentos, is a Mexican multinational food processing and distribution company headquartered in San Pedro Garza García, Nuevo León, Mexico. It produces and distributes refrigerated foods, mainly lunch meats, cheeses, and yogurts. It is one of the largest producers and distributors of refrigerated foods in the country, some of its well-known brands are Fud, Chen, San Rafael, Guten, and Yoplait. It is a subsidiary of the Mexican industrial conglomerate Alfa.

Sigma reported sales of $6.9 billion for 2021. It has 67 plants and 152 distribution centers that employ more than 38,000 people in 18 countries. The company increased its presence in the United States and the Eurozone through acquisitions, of which the two largest have been the American Bar-S in 2010, and the European Campofrio in 2014.

Sigma markets its products in Mexico through major supermarkets, wholesale distributors, convenience stores, and mom-and-pop outlets. In the United States, it operates through Sigma Foods and Bar-S Foods, with regional headquarters in Phoenix, Arizona. In the Eurozone, it operates through Campofrío, jointly acquired with the Chinese WH Group in 2014. In June 2015, Alfa announced it had acquired the remaining 37% of the shares of Campofrío held by WH Group so that Sigma can later buy it.

The company has presence in the Americas and in the Eurozone. In North America it has a presence in Mexico and the United States; in the Eurozone, it has a presence in Belgium, France, Germany, Italy, Netherlands, Portugal, and Spain; and in Central and South America, in Costa Rica, Dominican Republic, Ecuador, El Salvador, Guatemala, Honduras, Nicaragua, Panama, and Peru.

In 2014, Sigma's parent company, Alfa, announced it may hold an initial public offering to list Sigma in the Mexican Stock Exchange.
