= Cucapá (beer) =

Mexican beer brand

- Type: Beer
- Manufacturer: Grupo Modelo
- Origin: Mexico

Cucapá is a Mexican craft beer brand produced by Cervecería de Baja California (trading as Cucapá Brewing Co.) in Mexicali, Baja California. Founded in 2002, it was one of the earliest craft breweries in Mexico, and the brand was acquired by Grupo Modelo, the Mexican subsidiary of Anheuser-Busch InBev, in 2016. Its name derives from the Cocopah people (Cucapá in Spanish), an Indigenous group of the Colorado River Delta region near Mexicali.

== History ==
Cucapá was founded in Mexicali in December 2002 by Mario García, opening initially as a brewpub at a time when craft beer was little known in Mexico. According to García, the company produced about 500 hectolitres in its first year and for several years brewed almost exclusively for its own bar and restaurant before expanding distribution to Mexicali, Tijuana and across the border to San Diego, where the craft beer scene was growing rapidly.
