= Alpek =

Business operations at Mexico

Alpek S.A.B de C.V.
- Type: Public
- Traded as: BMV: ALPEK A
- Industry: Chemicals
- Founded: 1975; 51 years ago
- Headquarters: Monterrey, [Mexico
- Area served: Global
- Key people: Álvaro Fernández (chairman); Jorge P. Young (CEO)
- Products: PET, PTA, EPS, PP, Energy Commercialization
- Revenue: ▼US$ 6.5 billion (2017)
- Net income: ▲US$ 65 million (2017)
- Total assets: US$ 4.4 billion (2017)
- Number of employees: 5,000
- Subsidiaries: Alpek Polyester; Indelpro; Polioles; Styropek; NEG; Terza

Alpek S.A.B. de C.V., known as Alpek, is a Mexican chemical manufacturing company headquartered in San Pedro Garza García, in Nuevo León, Mexico. It is one of the largest PET and PTA producers in the Americas and the sole producer of polypropylene in Mexico. It is the largest business unit of the industrial conglomerate Alfa, representing 37% of its revenues for 2014. It is also the largest chemical company in Mexico according to Expansion magazine.

Alpek reported revenues of $6.5 billion for 2014. It operates facilities in 21 sites in the United States, Mexico, Brazil, Argentina and Chile and employs 5,000 people.

Alpek was listed on the Mexican Stock Exchange on April 26, 2012, and is a constituent of the IPC, the main benchmark index of the Mexican Stock Exchange.
