= Tijuana Beer =

Cerveza Tijuana
- Industry: Alcoholic beverage
- Founded: 2000; 26 years ago
- Headquarters: Tijuana, Mexico
- Products: Beer
- Website: TJ Beer

Tijuana Beer (Cerveza Tijuana) also known as TJ Beer, is located in the city of Tijuana, and is one of the handful of Mexican microbrewies. Founded in 2000, the master brewer is a third generation master brewer from the Czech Republic who produces all lagers.

== Accolades ==
Cerveza Tijuana's beers were given the "thumbs up" by both Michael Jackson and Charlie Papazian, two world-renowned beer critics. Cerveza Tijuana is also mentioned in Papazian's most recent book.
