= Consorcio ARA =

Mexican affordable housing construction company

Consórcio ARA, S.A.B de CV
- Company type: Sociedad Anónima Bursátil de Capital Variable
- Traded as: BMV: ARA *
- Industry: Construction & Real Estate
- Founded: 1977; 49 years ago
- Headquarters: Mexico City, Mexico
- Key people: Germán Ahumada Russek, (Chairman)
- Revenue: ▼US$ 532.9 million (2011)
- Net income: ▼US$ 49.3 million (2011)
- Number of employees: 8,023
- Website: www.consorcioara.com.mx

Consorcio ARA is a Mexico-based construction company specialized in the construction, maintenance and commercialization of low-income, affordable entry-level, middle-income and residential buildings. In addition, ARA is engaged in real estate developments, such as shopping centers and golf courses.

The company also operates 20 concrete production plants for its own use.

Headquartered in Mexico City, ARA operated offices in New York and Chicago in the United States. The US offices were closed as of September 2010.
