= Expansión (Mexico) =

- Editor: Eladio González
- Categories: Business
- Founder: John Christman, Harvey Popell and Gustavo Romero Kolbeck
- First issue: 29 January 1969; 57 years ago
- Company: Grupo Expansión, S.A. de C.V.
- Country: Mexico
- Based in: Mexico City
- Language: Spanish
- Website: expansion.mx

Expansión is a Spanish-language news magazine targeted to business markets in Mexico and Latin America created in 1969 and redesigned in 1999. While most business media in Mexico focus on macroeconomic and political aspects, Expansión is set apart by its coverage of the people and ideas that drive the private sector in Mexico.

Expansión is the flagship publication of Grupo Expansión (GEx), founded in 1966. In 2005, GEx was acquired by Time Inc. In 2007, Expansión and CNN jointly launched a website specializing in business, economic, and financial aspects in Mexico and Latin America. The site was originally launched as CNNExpansion.com as an adaptation modeled on CNNmoney.com for the Latin American market. Private equity firm Southern Cross Group acquired GEx in 2014. In 2015, the parent of El Economista acquired GEx from Southern Cross.

Expansión includes more advertising pages than any other magazine in Mexico for more than 10 years only in the last 3 years has it been surpassed by its sister publication: Who magazine. With 51,000 copies aimed at an executive segment (93% senior management), Expansión has been the authority on business in Mexico for more than 50 years and has almost twice the circulation of its closest competitor.
