= ALFA (Mexico) =

Mexican multinational conglomerate

ALFA S.A.B. de C.V.
- Company type: Public
- Traded as: BMV: ALFA A BMAD: XALFA
- Industry: Consumer Staples - Packaged Foods & Meats
- Founded: 1974; 52 years ago
- Headquarters: Monterrey, Mexico
- Area served: Worldwide
- Key people: Álvaro Fernández (Chairman & CEO)
- Products: Packaged Foods & Meats
- Revenue: ▲US$ 17.2 billion (2014)
- Net income: ▼US$ -119 million (2014)
- Total assets: ▲US$ 15.8 billion (2014)
- Number of employees: 68,000
- Subsidiaries: Sigma
- Website: www.alfa.com.mx

Alfa S.A.B. de C.V., also known as Alfa, was the seventh largest company of Mexico in 2013 according to CNN Expansión.^{[1]} and once a Mexican multinational conglomerate headquartered in Monterrey, Mexico, underwent a corporate simplification process to transition from a conglomerate into a pure play consumer packaged goods business.

Currently, Alfa operates through Sigma, a leading multinational food company operating in 17 countries grouped in 4 regions: Mexico, Europe, U.S., and Latam. With 64 plants and 189 distribution centers, the company produces, commercializes, and distributes quality branded foods, including packaged meats, cheese, yogurts, and other refrigerated and frozen foods. Sigma's diversified portfolio includes more than 100 brands in different categories and market segments such as: FUD, Campofrio, Bar-S, San Rafael, Aoste, La Villita, Fiorucci, Chimex, Navidul, Justin Bridou y Sosua, among other.

Alfa is listed on the Mexican Stock Exchange and the Latibex, the Latin American market in the Madrid Stock Exchange. It is a constituent of the IPC, the main benchmark index of the Mexican Stock Exchange, and of the S&P Latin America 40, which includes leading, blue chip companies from Latin America.

== History ==
=== Early years ===
The Monterrey Group empire derived from the founding in Monterrey of Cerveceria Cuauhtemoc, a brewery, in 1890 by Jose Calderon Penilla, Isaac Garza Garza, and two others. In 1936 the family holdings, already vast, were divided into two separate industrial groups. One of these, Valores Industriales S.A. (Visa), established Hojalata y Laminas S.A. (Hylsa) to make steel sheet for the bottle caps of its beverages during World War II, when the United States cut steel supplies to Mexico to meet its own needs. Hylsa became the largest privately run steel mill in Mexico, a fully integrated complex with activities ranging from mining and processing iron ore to finished products. In 1957 it patented HyL, a system of direct reduction known as fire sponging.

One of the two heads Eugenio Garza Sada, of the Monterrey Group, was murdered in 1973 in what was described as an abortive kidnapping by left-wing terrorists, but before this happened, he and his brother Roberto Garza Sada had divided the company into two parts. Bernardo Garza Sada, Roberto's son, became chairman of Grupo Industrial Alfa, S.A., which inherited Hylsa and many other industrial enterprises, including Empaques de Carton Titan, a packaging company founded in 1926; Nylon de Mexico (synthetic fibers), founded in 1952; and Polioles (chemicals), founded in 1962. "There is no falling out", one source explained to The New York Times. "But there was a real problem as to who would be next 'supreme,' so they juggled the shares within the family and divided the group."

Under Bernardo Garza Sada's leadership Alfa diversified from its base into petrochemicals, synthetic fibers, capital machinery, farm equipment, television sets, and tourism. It also took a quarter share in Grupo Televisa, which virtually monopolized Mexican television broadcasting. Its assets grew from $315 million to $1.5 billion between 1974 and 1978, its sales from $194 million to $836 million, and its income from $21 million to $83 million. In 1978 Alfa was the only Mexican company in the Fortune 500 list of the biggest companies outside the United States, except for state-owned Petroleos de Mexico (Pemex). Himself a graduate of the Massachusetts Institute of Technology, Garza Sada staffed top management with graduates of MIT, Harvard, and the University of Pennsylvania's Wharton School of Business. One observer said they "always picked the kid with the Harvard MBA over the guy who really knew the business. The Alfa man had to look good on paper."

Although Alfa formed joint ventures with Hercules and American Petrofina to produce polyester, Du Pont to produce other synthetic fibers, Ford to turn out aluminum cylinder heads, and Hitachi to make electric motors, it insisted on control. "We manage these ventures, always", Garza Sada told Forbes in 1979. "We demand that!" Alfa received $2.4 billion in loans from more than 130 foreign creditors and was planning to invest $3.5 billion by the end of 1984, almost three-fifths of it in money to be borrowed, mostly from sources outside Mexico. It was not only the leading private firm in Mexico but in all of Latin America. By 1980 it had 157 subsidiaries in 39 branches of the economy.

In retrospect, following Alfa's near-bankruptcy in 1982, Alfa's success bred arrogance. Many of the lower-management people had no practical experience, while the experienced upper management took charge of firms about which they knew very little. The company unwisely abandoned its prudent traditional policy of only integrating firms that had similar or complementary products. One observer said that Alfa "bought businesses like someone would buy candies for their children." A foreign bank representative recalled, "They were on the same kind of role that the Mexican government was on then. Oil prices would know no limit. Grupo Alfa profits would know no limit."

=== Restructuring in the 1980s ===
As an era of high prices for Mexico's oil exports suddenly came to an end, in late 1981 Alfa dropped its projection of earnings for the year from $80 million to $2 million. By the end of the year it was predicting a $60 million loss and it finally reported an actual loss of $120 million. Before the year was out the government had extended Alfa an emergency aid package of 12 billion pesos ($480 million). In 1982 the Mexican economy hit the rocks. Largely because of the collapse of the peso and heavy interest obligations, Alfa lost $233 million and suspended principal as well as interest payments. In July 1982 it presented a restructuring plan that called for it to sell one-fourth of its assets over a five-year period. The corporate staff was slashed from 4,000 to 1,000, and later to 400. Manufacturing ventures in television sets, bicycles, and tractors were sold.

Eventually, in 1986, Alfa paid off about five dozen foreign banks in stock. Under a complex arrangement, the creditor banks forgave $920 million in Alfa's debt in return for 45 percent of its stock. A 15-member board was named to govern the company, of which nine would be named jointly by the foreign banks and the Garza Sada family. A five-year voting trust for the stock was formed under which 16 percent of the Garza Sada family stock would be held with the 45 percent of the bank stock. The creditors also were paid $25 million by Alfa and $200 million in Mexican government debt.

Alfa also was required to divest itself of an undisclosed number of companies that were not part of its core business. By the end of 1988 it had sold most of its food, and all of its tourism, real estate, and electric home-appliance holdings, retaining only two dozen subsidiaries. "There are no family members in important executive positions", Business Latin America wrote, "and this has contributed to a more professional and predictable management style."

The settlement of Alfa's debt left unresolved Hylsa's own debt, which in 1988 reached $1.2 billion to 68 lenders, including about $300 million in overdue interest. About 70 percent of the foreign lenders agreed to exchange about $639 million of the debt for about $385 million in debt owed by Mexico itself and about $69 million in cash. In addition, foreign lenders who were owed $273 million and Mexican banks holding about $301 million in Hylsa debt agreed to stretch out the loan repayments over 15 years and received 21 percent of Hylsa's common stock. The agreements allowed Hylsa to spend as much as $165 million over the next five years in capital expenditures, thereby giving it the opportunity to continue trying to compete in a crowded industry.

Alfa celebrated the restructuring of its debts with an elaborate outdoor mass on a Monterrey baseball field in 1988, attended by 10,000 employees. The company recorded the most profitable year of its history in 1988. Operating income was a record $425 million and special gains related to the debt restructuring and the peso's stabilization against the dollar added $575 million more. Alfa did so well that the Garza Sada family was able to buy back much of the equity it had surrendered to its creditors.

=== 1990s ===
The early 1990s were not as good a period for Alfa, as world demand for petrochemicals and steel slowed. In 1993 the company had revenues of 8.56 billion pesos ($2.5 billion), but operating income fell to 444 million pesos ($130 million). That year it sold its 51 percent stake in one of the Monterrey Group's oldest holdings, the paper and packaging subsidiary Empaques de Carton Titan.

When Dionisio Garza Medina, a nephew of Bernardo Garza Sada, became chairman in 1994, he fired half of Alfa's middle managers and focused on restoring higher profitability to the company's three main business sectors: steel, petrochemicals, and food. Hylsa (now Hylsamex) and Sigma Alimentos, the food subsidiary, received their own separate stock listings to reduce their dependence on the parent company. "If you look at the profile of our strategy", Garza Medina told a The Wall Street Journal reporter, "we are going from a commodity company into more value-added products", with higher profit margins. He also said Alfa would enter retailing by opening 25 home-improvement stores over the next five years.

The collapse of the peso in late 1994 took a heavy toll on Alfa, as on other Mexican enterprises. Net sales rose to 14.21 billion pesos ($4.06 billion), but the company lost 2.16 billion pesos ($617 million). In 1995 Alfa returned to profitability, with net income of 2.09 billion pesos ($307 million) on net sales of 21.52 billion pesos ($3.16 billion). This was followed in 1996 by net income of 3.06 billion pesos ($400 million) on net sales of 27.83 billion pesos ($3.64 billion). Alfa's total debt was 18.5 billion pesos ($2.7 billion). The net worth of Bernardo Garza Sada and his family was estimated at $1.2 billion in 1996.

Hylsamex's revenues accounted for nearly one-third of Alfa's in 1995 (and 35 percent in 1996), but its net income in 1995 was only 12 percent of the group's total. This company was involved in the entire steelmaking process from mining iron ore to manufacturing and distributing steel products. A low-cost steel producer that invested $982 million between 1990 and 1996 to modernize its facilities, it had the most diversified product line in Mexico's steel industry and was making products for use in the construction, auto parts, and home appliance industries. It held 48 percent of the cold-rolled sheet market, 44 percent of the small-diameter pipe market, and 38 percent of the galvanized-sheet market in 1995. A new flat-steel minimill was opened that year.

Sigma Alimentos, S.A. de C.V. (formerly Salumni, S.A. de C.V.), which distributed Oscar Mayer and its own brand of packaged meat and other food products, enjoyed 36 percent of domestic market share in processed meats in 1995. Its distribution network included 50 refrigerated warehouses and a fleet of more than 800 refrigerated vehicles, including 570 delivery trucks. A frozen food plant and a cheese manufacturing facility were under construction. Sigma was planning to make frozen Mexican food for both the domestic and U.S. markets. This subsidiary accounted for 12 percent of Alfa's revenues in 1996.

Alfa's subsidiary Alpek, S.A. de C.V. was engaged in the manufacture of petrochemicals and synthetic fibers for use primarily as raw materials in the textile, food, beverage, packaging, construction, and automotive industries. It was also engaged in the manufacture of raw materials used in the production of polyester fibers and polymer products and in the manufacture of specialty chemical products. Its own subsidiaries included Petrocel, S.A.; Nylon de Mexico, S.A. (60 percent); and Polioles, S.A. de C.V. (51 percent). Alpek was Alfa's biggest subsidiary, accounting for 44.5 percent of the parent company's revenues in 1996.

Versax, S.A. de C.V. was an Alfa subsidiary engaged in the production of aluminum cylinder heads and in three other industries: carpets and rugs, mattresses, and building supplies. Another important subsidiary was Dinamica, S.A., which acted as the service group for the holding company.

In 1996, Alfa formed a joint venture with Valores Industriales, Bancomer (Mexico's second largest bank), and AT&T to enter the Mexican long-distance telephone market in competition against Teléfonos de Mexico. Alfa took a 26 percent interest in the company, Alestra, with Visa and Bancomer holding 25 percent and AT&T holding the remaining 49 percent. Alestra began long-distance operations in Monterrey and Querétaro at the beginning of 1997 under the AT&T name. Alfa's stake was held through its subsidiary AlfaTelecom, S.A. de C.V.

In all, Alfa was operating ten petrochemical and synthetic fiber plants in 1995, seven steel plants and a service center, six refrigerated-food plants, two carpet and rug plants, two mattress plants, an aluminum cylinder-head plant, and two building supplies retail stores. It operated more than 70 distribution centers. Alfa was a party to 11 joint ventures with foreign companies.

=== 2010s ===
In May 2015, Alfa and British energy firm Harbour Energy collaborated by making a bid to acquire Canadian oil and gas company Pacific Rubiales Energy for C$6 billion, including debt.
