= 1884 in Mexico =

- Decades: 1860s; 1870s; 1880s; 1890s; 1900s
- See also: History of Mexico; List of years in Mexico; Timeline of Mexican history

Events in the year 1884 in Mexico.

== Incumbents ==
- President Porfirio Díaz
- Archbishop of Mexico – Pelagio Antonio de Labastida y Dávalos

=== Governors ===
- Aguascalientes: Rafael Arellano Ruíz Esparza
- Campeche: Juan Montalvo
- Chiapas: José María Ramírez
- Chihuahua: Luis Terrazas/Ramón Cuéllar Aranda/Celso González Esquivel/Carlos Pacheco Villalobos/Carlos Fuero
- Coahuila: Blas Rodríguez Farías/Francisco de Paula Ramos/Praxedis de la Peña García
- Colima: Esteban García
- Durango:
- Guanajuato:
- Guerrero:
- Hidalgo: Simón Cravioto
- Jalisco: Francisco Tolentino/Maximiano Valdovinos
- State of Mexico:
- Michoacán: Mariano Jiménez
- Morelos: Carlos Quaglia Zimbrón
- Nuevo León: Canuto García
- Oaxaca:
- Puebla:
- Querétaro: Rafael Olvera Ledesma
- San Luis Potosí: Carlos Díez Gutiérrez
- Sinaloa:
- Sonora:
- Tabasco:
- Tamaulipas: Antonio Canales Molano/Juan Gójon/Romulo Cuellar
- Tlaxcala: José María Grajales/Teodoro Rivera
- Veracruz: José Cortés Frías/Juan de la Luz Enríquez Lara
- Yucatán: General Octavio Rosado
- Zacatecas:

== Events ==
- June 2 – Banamex was formed from the merger of Banco Nacional Mexicano and Banco Mercantil Mexicano, two banks that had operated since the beginning of 1882.
- December 1 – Porfirio Díaz becomes president of Mexico for the second time after winning the elections.
- December 18 – The Territory of Nayarit is formed once its territorial limits with Jalisco were established.

== Notable births ==
- January 11 — Clara Oriol de la Huerta, First Lady of Mexico (1920) (d. 1967)

=== Dates unknown ===
- José Fondevila García was born in Pontevedra province Spain (died 1973)
- José Inés Salazar, fought in the Mexican Revolution was born in Casas Grandes, Chihuahua (died 1917)

== Bibliography ==
- Fernández, Iñigo (2002). History of Mexico: A Journey from Prehistoric Times to the Present Day. Translated by David B. Castledine. Monclem Ediciones. ISBN 970-9019-12-0.
