= Carlos Slim =

Mexican business oligarch (born 1940)

Carlos Slim Helú
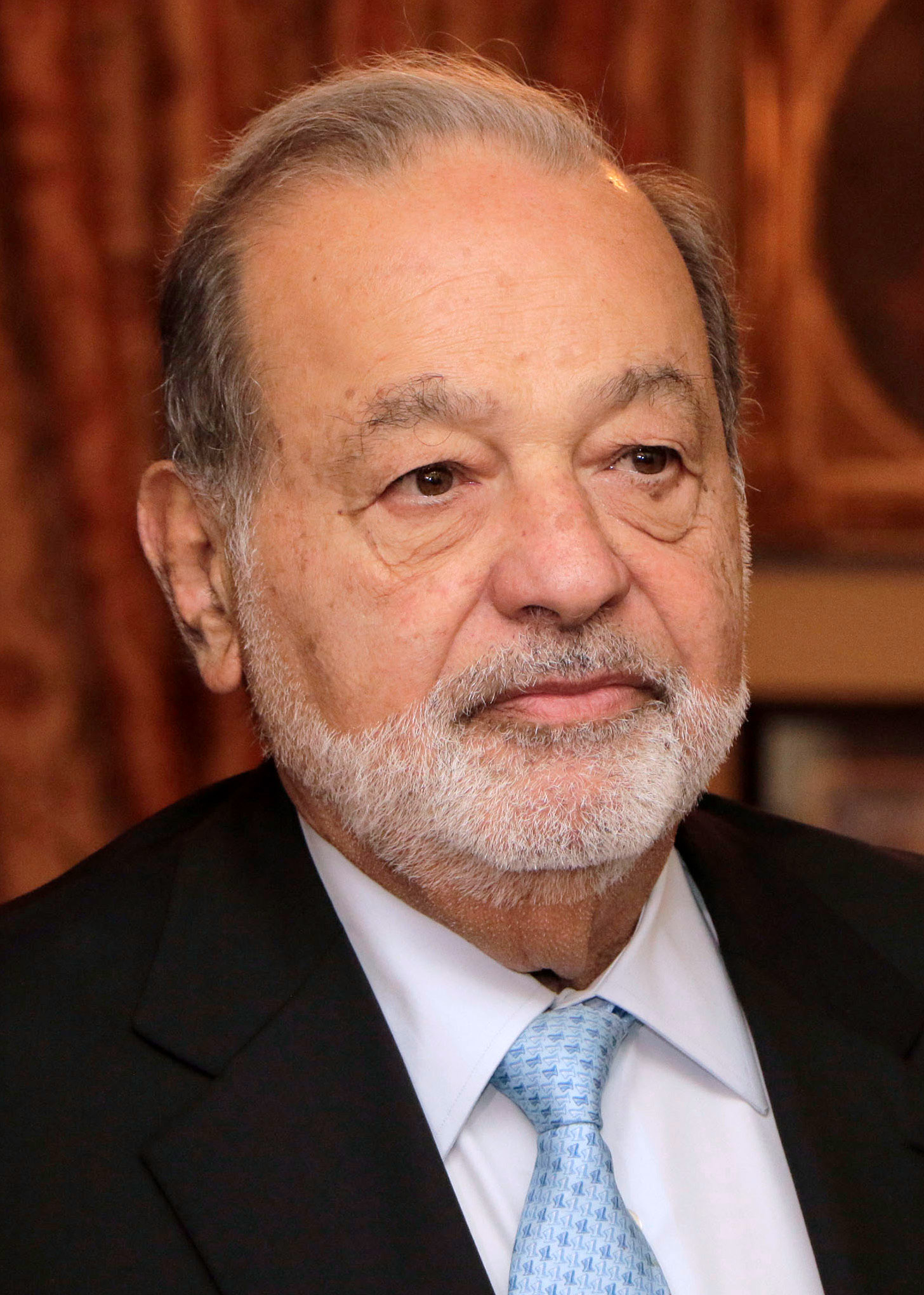
- Slim in 2018
- Born: 28 January 1940 (age 86); Mexico City, Mexico
- Education: National Autonomous University of Mexico (BS)
- Occupations: Businessman; investor; philanthropist
- Known for: CEO of Telmex, América Móvil, and Grupo Carso; World's richest person, 2010–13
- Spouse: Soumaya Domit (m. 1967; died 1999)
- Children: 6, including Carlos
- Relatives: Alfredo Harp Helú (cousin); Arturo Elías Ayub (son-in-law)
- Website: carlosslim.com

Carlos Slim Helú (Spanish: [ˈkaɾlos esˈlin eˈlu, - esˈlim -]; born 28 January 1940) is a Mexican business oligarch, investor, and philanthropist. From 2010 to 2013, Slim was ranked as the richest person in the world by Forbes business magazine. He derived his fortune from his extensive holdings in a considerable number of Mexican companies through his conglomerate, Grupo Carso. As of September 2026, the Bloomberg Billionaires Index ranked him as the 16th-richest person in the world, with a net worth of US$123 billion, making him the richest person in Latin America.

Slim's corporate conglomerate spans numerous industries across the Mexican economy, including education, health care, industrial manufacturing, transportation, real estate, mass media, mining, energy, entertainment, technology, retail, sports and financial services. However, the core of his fortune derives from telecommunications, where he owns América Móvil (with operations throughout Latin America) and the Mexican carrier Telcel and Internet service provider Telmex, a state-run-gone-private company which maintained a virtual monopoly for many years after Slim's acquisition. He accounts for 40 per cent of the listings on the Mexican Stock Exchange. As of 2016, he was the largest single shareholder of non-voting shares of the New York Times Company. In 2017, he sold half of his shares.

== Early life ==
Slim was born on 28 January 1940, in Mexico City, to Julián Slim Haddad (born Khalil Salim Haddad Aglamaz) and Linda Helú Atta, both Maronite Christians from Lebanon. He decided at a young age that he wanted to be a businessman when he grew up, and received business lessons from his father, who taught him basic financial, business management, and accounting principles by instructing him in how to analyze and interpret financial statements in addition to stressing the young Carlos in the importance of keeping accurate financial records when doing business.

At the age of 11, Slim invested in a government savings bond, which taught him about the concept of compound interest. Adhering to his father's emphasis on the importance of keeping accurate financial records, he eventually saved every financial and business transaction he ever made into a personal ledger book, which he still keeps to this day. At the age of 12, he made his first stock investment, by buying shares outright of a Mexican bank. By the age of 15, Slim had become a shareholder in Mexico's largest bank. At the age of 17, he earned 200 pesos a week working for his father's company. He went on to study civil engineering at the National Autonomous University of Mexico, where he also concurrently taught algebra and linear programming.

Though Slim was a civil engineering major, he also displayed an interest in economics. Broadening his academic interests outside his traditional area of study beyond civil engineering, he took economics courses in Chile when he completed his engineering degree. Graduating as a civil engineering major, Slim has stated that his mathematical ability and his background of linear programming was a key factor in helping him gain a competitive edge in the business world, especially when analyzing the financial statements of prospective companies while making his business decisions as well as evaluating potential investment acquisitions and stock purchases.

== Career ==
=== 1960s ===
After graduating from university in 1961, Slim launched his business career by starting off as a stock trader in Mexico, often working 14-hour days to make a name for himself in the Mexican business world. In 1965, profits from Slim's private business and investment ventures reached US$400,000 (equivalent to US$4.09 million in 2025), enabling him to start the stock brokerage house Inversora Bursátil. He also began laying the financial groundwork for his eventual conglomerate, Grupo Carso. In 1965, he also acquired Jarritos del Sur, a Mexican bottling and soft drink company. In 1966, worth US$40 million (equivalent to US$397 million in 2025), he established Inmuebles Carso, a Mexican real estate agency and holding company.

=== 1970s ===
Companies in the Mexican construction, soft drink, printing, real estate, bottling and mining industries were the initial focus of Slim's burgeoning business career. He later expanded his business operations and commercial activities by venturing into numerous industries across the Mexican economy including auto parts, aluminum, airlines, chemicals, tobacco, cable and wire manufacturing, paper and packaging, copper and mineral extraction, tires, cement, retail, hotels, beverage distributors, telecommunications and financial services (Slim's Grupo Financiero Inbursa sells insurance and manages mutual funds and pension plans for millions of ordinary Mexicans). By 1972, he had established or acquired a further seven businesses in these industry categories, which included the acquisition of a construction equipment rental company. In 1980, he consolidated his business interests by forming Grupo Galas as the parent company of a conglomerate that had interests in industrial manufacturing, construction, mining, retail, food, and tobacco.

=== 1980s ===
In 1982, the Mexican economy contracted rapidly. As many banks were struggling and foreign investors were cutting back on investing and scurrying, Slim began investing heavily and acquired shares in a plethora of Mexican flagship businesses outright at depressed valuations. Much of Slim's business dealings involved a simple strategy, which entails buying a business and retaining it for its cash flow, or eventually selling the stake at a greater profit in future, thereby netting the capital gains as well as reinvesting the initial principal into a new business. In addition, the complexity of Grupo Carso's corporate conglomerate structural labyrinth web of companies allows Slim to purchase a manifold of stakes across a wide range of industries, thereby making the overall conglomerate nearly recession-proof in the event that one or more industry sectors of the Mexican economy underperform.

Amidst the Mexican economic downturn before its gradual recovery in 1985, Slim invested heavily by snapping up numerous Mexican flagship companies for pennies on the dollar. Among the panoply of acquisitions that Slim procured included Empresas Frisco, a mining concessionary and chemical maker, Industrias Nacobre, a copper manufacturer, Reynolds Aluminio, a Mexican aluminum concern, Compañía Hulera Euzkadi (Mexico's largest tire maker), and Bimex hotels, a hotel chain. He also became the majority shareholder of Sanborn Hermanos, a prominent Mexican food retailer, gift shop and restaurant chain, which was later incorporated as Grupo Carso's retailing arm. In 1984, Slim spent US$13 million (equivalent to US$40.3 million in 2025) to acquire Mexican insurance agency Seguros de México, and later subsumed the company into the firm, Seguros Inbursa. The value of his stake in Seguros eventually grew to being worth US$1.5 billion by 2007 (equivalent to US$2.33 billion in 2025), after four spinoffs. Slim also acquired a 40% and 50% interest in the Mexican arms of British American Tobacco and The Hershey Company, respectively. He acquired large blocks of Denny's and Firestone Tires. From Seguros de México, Fianzas La Guardiana and Casa de Bolsa Inbursa, he formed the Grupo Financiero Inbursa, a Mexican financial services provider. Many of these corporate acquisitions were financed by the income-generating revenues and cash flows derived from Cigatam, a Mexican tobacco distributor that he purchased in the economic downturn that hit Mexico during the early 1980s.

In 1988, Slim bought Nacobre, a Mexican copper manufacturer that manufactured, marketed and distributed copper and copper alloy products, along with Química Fluor, a Mexican chemical maker.

=== 1990s ===
Slim realized windfall profits in the early 1990s when the Mexican government began privatizing its telecom industry. Capitalizing on the bevy of potential business opportunities that could crop up and be exploited through this political change motivated Slim and his conglomerate Grupo Carso to acquire Telmex, a landline telecommunications operator from the Mexican government. In 1990, Grupo Carso was floated as a public company initially in Mexico and then worldwide. During the same year, Grupo Carso also acquired a majority ownership of Porcelanite, a Mexican tilemaker.

To ultimately realize his further commercial business ambitions and reap the material benefits that would eventually transpire through the acquisition of Telmex, Slim acted in concert later in 1990 with the French telecom operator France Télécom and the American telco Southwestern Bell Corporation to purchase the landline telecommunications service provider from the Mexican government, when the opportunity for Slim to purchase the telco presented itself and materialized when Mexico began privatizing its national industries at the turn of the 1980s. Slim was an early investment backer in Telmex, where the concomitant income-producing cash flows and revenue-generating profits of the telecommunications provider eventually formed the bulk of his private fortune. By 2006, Telmex controlled and operated 90 percent of the telephone lines in Mexico, and his wireless telecommunications company, Telcel, which was created out of the Radiomóvil Dipsa company, operated almost 80 percent of the entire country's cellphones.

In 1991, he acquired Hoteles Calinda (now OSTAR Grupo Hotelero), a hotel chain and in 1993, he increased his stakes in General Tire, an American tiremaker and a distributor of aluminum profiles and aluminum concern Grupo Aluminio to the point where he had a majority interest in the company.

In 1996, Slim split Grupo Carso into three separate constituent companies: Carso Global Telecom, Grupo Carso, and Invercorporación. In the following year, Slim bought the Mexican arm of Sears Roebuck.

In 1999, Slim began expanding his business interests beyond Latin America. Though the bulk of his business holdings remained in Mexico, he began setting his sights on exploring the United States as a target destination to exploit potential foreign investment acquisitions and new emerging business opportunities.

=== 2000s ===
Slim made headlines within the American business scene in 2003 when he began purchasing large stakes in a number of major US retailers such as Barnes & Noble, OfficeMax, Office Depot, Circuit City, Borders, and CompUSA. Much of the rationale behind Slim's international commercial expansion beyond Mexico was due to a running joke in Mexican business circles that "there was nothing left to acquire in Mexico." He set up a Telmex USA branch and also acquired a stake in Tracfone, an American cellular telephone operator. Concurrently, Slim established Carso Infraestructura y Construcción, S. A. (CICSA) as a non-profit subsidiary construction and engineering firm within Grupo Carso. During the same year, Slim underwent heart surgery and subsequently passed on much of his day-to-day corporate involvement to his children and their spouses.

América Telecom, the holding company for América Móvil, was incorporated in 2000. Concurrently, Telmex also spun off its international cellular phone division for a US$15 billion (equivalent to US$28 billion in 2025) listing of América Móvil SA on the New York Stock Exchange. Telmex has taken numerous stakes of various international cellular telephone operators outside of Mexico, including the Brazilian ATL and Telecom Americas concerns, Techtel in Argentina, and others in Guatemala and Ecuador. In subsequent years, the company made further investments across Latin America, with companies in Colombia, Nicaragua, Peru, Chile, Honduras, and El Salvador, well as a joint venture with the American software house, Microsoft called Tlmsn, a Spanish-language web portal.

In 2005, Slim invested in Volaris, a Mexican airline and founded Impulsora del Desarrollo y el Empleo en América Latina SAB de CV (using the acronym "IDEAL"—roughly translated as "Promoter of Development and Employment in Latin America"), a Mexican construction and civil engineering company primarily engaged in not-for-profit infrastructure development. Since 2006, IDEAL won three infrastructure contracts yet it faces stiff competition from a number of other Mexican and Spanish construction companies.

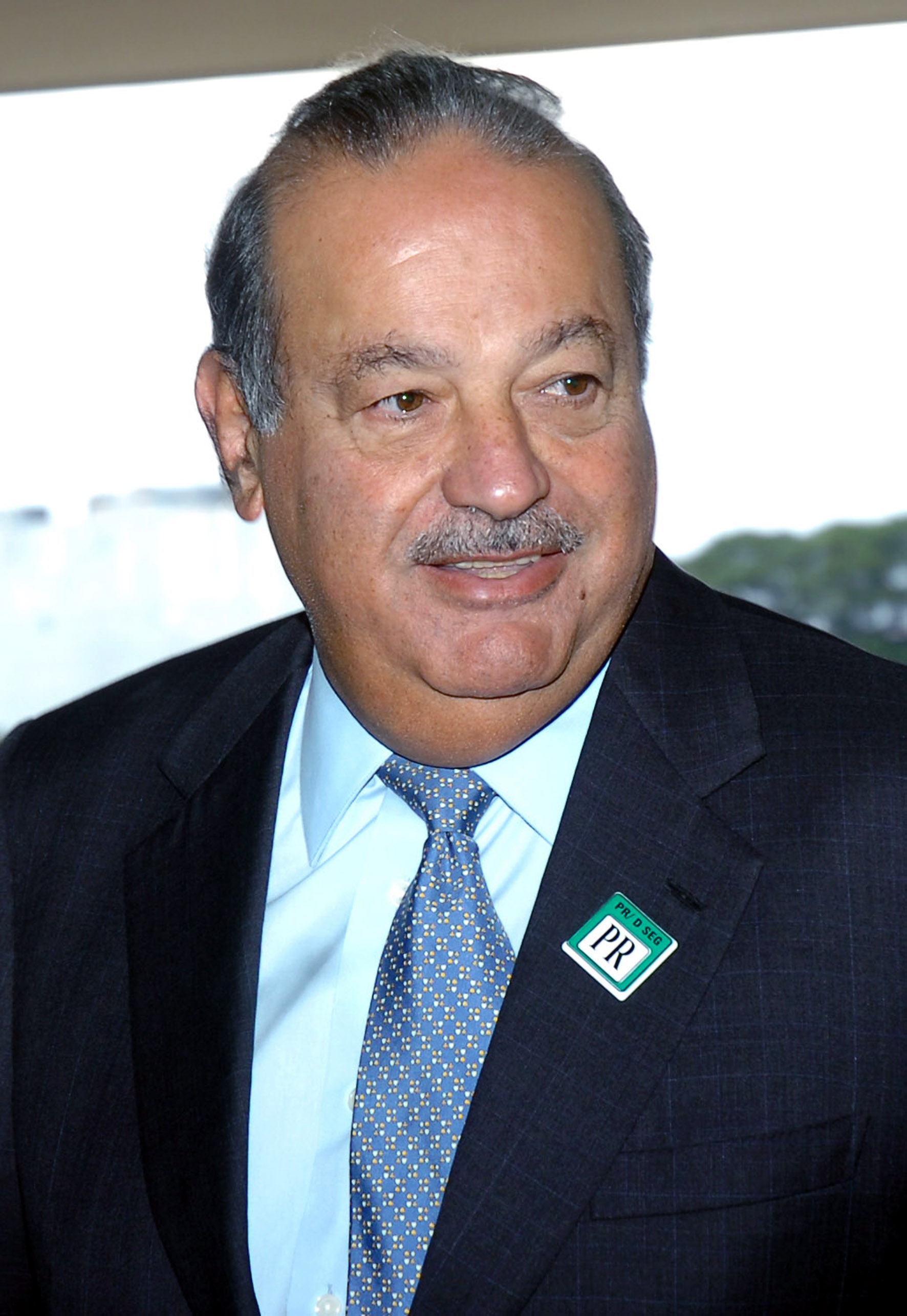
Arriving at the Presidential Palace for a meeting with Brazil's President Luiz Inácio Lula da Silva on 24 October 2007

In 2007, after having amassed a 50.1% stake in the Cigatam tobacco manufacturer, Slim sold a large portion of his equity to Philip Morris for US$1.1 billion (equivalent to US$1.71 billion in 2025). During the same year, Slim sold off his entire stake of Porcelanite for US$800 million (equivalent to US$1.24 billion in 2025), a Mexican tile-maker that he acquired back in 1990. He also licensed the Saks name and opened the Mexican arm of Saks Fifth Avenue retailer in Santa Fe, Mexico. Also in 2007, the estimated value of all of Slim's companies totaled US$150 billion (equivalent to US$233 billion in 2025). On December 8, 2007, Grupo Carso announced that the remaining 103 CompUSA retail stores would be either liquidated or sold, bringing an end to the struggling company, although the information technology division of CompUSA continued operating under the name Telvista around various American cities such as Dallas, Texas (U.S. Corporate Office), and Danville, Virginia. Telvista also has five centers in Mexico (three in Tijuana, one center in Mexicali, and one in México City). After 28 years of corporate involvement, Slim became the Honorary Lifetime Chairman of the business.

In 2008, Slim took a 6.4% stake valued at US$27 million (equivalent to US$40.4 million in 2025) in the New York Times Company, a prominent American newspaper publisher. Slim increased his stake to 8% by 2012. Slim's stake in the Times increased again to 16.8% of the company's Class A shares on 20 January 2015 when he exercised stock options to purchase 15.9 million shares, making him the largest shareholder in the company. The New York Times Company's Class A shares are available for purchase by the public and offer less control over the company than Class B shares, which are privately held. According to the company's 2016 annual filings, Slim owned 17.4% of the company's Class A shares, and none of the company's Class B shares.

=== 2010s ===
In 2012, Slim sold the broadcast rights for the Leon games to the American terrestrial television network, Telemundo, the cable channel Fox Sports in Mexico and the rest of Latin America, and the website mediotiempo.com. The games are also broadcast on the Internet through UNO TV, offered by Telmex. Slim has been involved with broadcasting sports outside Mexico to larger markets such as the United States. In March 2012, América Móvil acquired the broadcast rights for the Olympic Games in Sochi 2014 and the Brazil 2016 for Latin America.

In March 2012, Slim, along with American television host Larry King, established Ora TV, an on-demand digital television network that produces and distributes television shows including Larry King Now, Politicking with Larry King, Recessionista, and Jesse Ventura Uncensored.

In September 2012, Slim bought 30% stakes in Pachuca and León, two Mexican soccer teams through his telecommunications company América Móvil. In December 2012, he bought all the shares of the second division team Estudiantes Tecos. Slim has also completed business deals for the television rights to games of the Leon soccer team. His company América Móvil purchased 30 percent of the team along with transmission rights as Slim does not have the rights to transmit content by broadcast television or cable TV as well as putting him in competition with Televisa and TV Azteca, two television companies with rights to the rest of Mexican soccer's first division.

In July 2013, Slim's company América Móvil invested US$40 million (equivalent to US$55.3 million in 2025) in Shazam, a British commercial mobile phone-based music identification service for an undisclosed share of ownership. América Móvil partnered with the company to aid its growth into advertising and television and help the audio recognition service expand in Latin America.

In November 2013, Slim invested US$60 million (equivalent to US$82.9 million in 2025) in the Israeli startup Mobli, a company that deals with connections between people and communities corralled according to different interests.

In December 2013, Slim's private equity fund, Sinca Inbursa, sold its stake in the Mexican pharmaceutical company Landsteiner Scientific. Slim acquired a 27.51% stake in the company in June 2008, which represented 6.6% of Sinca's investment portfolio. The private equity fund's investments are mainly concentrated in the transportation and infrastructure sectors and the fund garnered a total market cap of MXN 5.152 billion (US$254 million) at the end of 2012.

On 23 April 2014, Slim took control of Telekom Austria, Austria's largest telecommunications company, which operates telcos in countries such as Bulgaria, Croatia, and Belarus, under a 10-year agreement. It was Slim's first successful business acquisition in Europe. In a syndicate holding structure the Austrian state holding company OIAG's 28% are combined with Slim's 27% ownership. América Móvil will spend as much as US$2 billion (equivalent to US$2.72 billion in 2025) to buy out minority shareholders in a mandatory public offer and invest up to €1 billion (US$1.13 billion) into the company, which it sees as "platform for expansion into central and eastern Europe". Labor representatives boycotted attending the OIAG supervisory board meeting for 12 hours criticizing the lack of explicit job guarantees.

In January 2015, Grupo Carso publicly launched Claro Musica, an online music service that is a Latin American equivalent of iTunes and Spotify. Slim, along with his son, increased their corporate presence in Mexico's music industry, particularly in the retail music sector since 2013. Sanborn's, the Mexican retail department store chain owned by Slim controls a majority stake in Mixup, Mexico's most successful retail music store that comprises a chain of 117-store Mexican retailers Mixup also generated more than US$320 million in revenue in 2014 (equivalent to US$435 million in 2025).

In March 2015, Slim made his presence known in the Spanish business scene by buying stakes in various troubled Spanish companies while perusing potential acquisitions across Europe. Slim's investment company, Inmobiliaria Carso, announced it will buy a stake in the Spanish bank, Bankia, which couples with Slim's other purchase of Realia, a Spanish real estate company, where Slim is the second largest shareholder holding a 25% equity stake, behind Fomento de Construcciones y Contratas, a Spanish construction company where Slim is also an active minor shareholder.

On 15 April 2015, Slim formed the oil company Carso Oil & Gas. A report that was released by the new company listed its assets at MXN 3.5 billion (US$173 million), placed within 17.7 million shares. Upon the formation of the company, Slim remained sanguine about the company's future potential and Mexico's burgeoning energy sector where the state monopoly ceased to exist.

On 25 July 2015, Slim's investment group Control Empresarial de Capitales invested in IMatchative, a technology startup that ranks the world's hedge funds creating in-depth behavioral profiles and business analytics. Limited partners pay US$30,000 (equivalent to US$40,748 in 2025) per subscription while hedge fund managers pay half the price and also sign up for a free version of the products the company offers.

=== 2020s ===
In early 2024, a news-story surfaced mentioning the book Why Nations Fail, and referencing that Slim's fortune was amassed by forming a telecommunications monopoly thanks to his close relationship with the government and not by innovation.

On 12 June 2024, Slim acquired a three per cent stake in British telecommunications company BT worth approximately £400 million (US$548 million). In September 2024, his stake was boosted to 4.3%.

== Philanthropy ==
Slim has been publicly skeptical of The Giving Pledge by Bill Gates and Warren Buffett giving away at least half of their fortunes. But—according to his spokesman—he devoted US$4 billion, or roughly 5%, to his Carlos Slim foundation as of 2011 (equivalent to US$5.72 billion in 2025). Though Slim has not gone as far as Gates and Buffett in pledging more than half of his fortune, Slim has expressed firm support for philanthropy and has advised budding entrepreneurs that businessmen must do more than give‍—‌they "should participate in solving problems".

In 2019, Forbes put Slim in the list of the world's most generous philanthropists outside of the US.

=== Fundación Carlos Slim ===
Established in 1986, Fundación Carlos Slim sponsors the Museo Soumaya in Mexico City, named after Slim's late wife, Soumaya Domit, opened 2011. It holds 66,000 pieces, including religious relics, contains the world's second-largest collection of Rodin sculptures, including The Kiss, the largest Salvador Dalí collection in Latin America, works by Leonardo da Vinci, Pablo Picasso, Pierre-Auguste Renoir, and coins from the viceroys of Spain. The inauguration in 2011 was attended by the President of Mexico, Nobel Prize laureates, writers and other celebrities.

After stating that he had donated US$4 billion of dividends to Fundación Carlos Slim, US$2 billion in 2006 (equivalent to US$3.19 billion in 2025), and another US$2 billion in 2010 (equivalent to US$2.95 billion in 2025), Slim was ranked fifth in Forbes' World's Biggest Givers in May 2011. Education and health care projects have included US$100 million (equivalent to US$143 million in 2025) to perform 50,000 cataract surgeries in Peru.

=== Fundación Telmex ===
In 1995, Slim established Fundación Telmex, a broad-ranging philanthropic foundation, which as he announced in 2007 had been provided with an asset base of US$4 billion (equivalent to US$6.21 billion in 2025) to establish Carso Institutes for Health, Sports and Education. Furthermore, it was to work in support of an initiative of Bill Clinton to aid the people of Latin America. The foundation has organized Copa Telmex, an amateur sports tournament, recognized in 2007 and 2008 by Guinness World Records as having the most participants of any such tournament in the world. Together with Fundación Carlos Slim Helú, Telmex announced in 2008 that it was to invest more than US$250 million (equivalent to US$374 million in 2025) in Mexican sports programs, from grass-roots level to Olympic standard. Telmex sponsored the Sauber F1 team for the 2011 season, who Mexican driver Sergio Pérez was driving for at the time. Telmex donated at least US$1 million to the Clinton Foundation (equivalent to US$1.43 million in 2025).

=== Fundación del Centro Histórico de la Ciudad de México A.C. ===
Slim has been Chair of the Council for the Restoration of the Historic Downtown of Mexico City since 2001.

In 2011, he, along with the president of Mexico, Mexico City mayor, and Mexico City archbishop, inaugurated the first phase of Plaza Mariana close to Basilica de Guadalupe. The complex, whose construction was funded by Slim, includes an evangelization center, museum, columbarium, health center, and market.

== Personal life ==
Slim was married to Soumaya Domit from 1967 until her death in 1999. Among her interests were various philanthropic projects. Slim has six children: Carlos, Marco Antonio, Patrick, Soumaya, Vanessa, and Johanna. His three older sons serve in key positions in the companies controlled by Slim where most are involved in the day-to-day running of Slim's business empire. Slim underwent heart surgery in 1999. In high school, Slim's favorite subjects were history, cosmography, and mathematics. Slim and his wife had a very happy marriage, and he indicated that he does not intend to remarry.

In his office, Slim does not have a computer, and instead keeps all his financial data in hand-written notebooks. Due to the vast size of his business empire, he often jokes that he cannot keep track of all the companies he manages. Slim is a Maronite Catholic, and he is one of the prominent backers of Legion of Christ, a Roman Catholic religious institute.

=== Family ===
Slim's father, Khalil Salim Haddad Aglamaz, was born on 17 July 1888 in Jezzine, Lebanon (then part of the Ottoman Empire). In 1902, at the age of 14, Haddad emigrated to Mexico alone, and later changed his name to Julián Slim Haddad. It was not uncommon for Lebanese children to be sent abroad before they reached the age of 15 to avoid being conscripted into the Ottoman Army, and four of Haddad's older brothers were already living in Mexico at the time of his arrival.

In 1911, Julián established a dry goods retail store, La Estrella de Oriente (The Star of the Orient). By 1921, he had begun investing in real estate in the flourishing commercial district of Mexico City where he acquired prime Mexican real estate at fire sale prices in the Zocalo District during the 1910–1917 Mexican Revolution. By 1922, Julián's net worth reached MXN 1,012,258 (equivalent to MXN 198 billion in 2025), diversified among a vast array of assets that included large swathes of investment-grade real estate, multiple businesses, and stocks.

In August 1926, Julián Slim married Linda Helú Atta. Linda, of Lebanese ancestry, was born in Parral, Chihuahua. Her parents had immigrated to Mexico from Lebanon in the late 19th century. Upon immigrating to Mexico, her parents founded one of the first Arabic-language magazines for the Lebanese-Mexican community, using a printing press they had brought with them. Julián and Linda had six children: Nour, Alma, Julián, José, Carlos, and Linda. Julián senior died in 1953, when Carlos was 13 years old.

In February 2011, Julian, the oldest brother of Carlos, died aged 74. He was an active businessman and worked in one of Mexico's top intelligence agencies.

== Net worth ==
=== Wealth ===
On 29 March 2007, Slim surpassed American investor Warren Buffett as the world's second-richest person, with an estimated net worth of US$53.1 billion (equivalent to US$82.4 billion in 2025) compared with Buffett's US$52.4 billion (equivalent to US$81.4 billion in 2025).

On 4 August 2007, The Wall Street Journal ran a cover story profiling Slim. The article said, "While the market value of his stake in publicly traded companies could decline at any time, at the moment he is probably wealthier than Bill Gates". According to The Wall Street Journal, Slim credits part of his ability to "discover investment opportunities" early to the writings of one of his friends, futurist author Alvin Toffler.

On 8 August 2007, Fortune magazine reported that Slim had overtaken Gates as the world's richest person. Slim's estimated fortune soared to US$59 billion (equivalent to US$91.6 billion in 2025), based on the value of his public holdings at the end of July. Gates' net worth was estimated to be at least US$58 billion (equivalent to US$90.1 billion in 2025).

On 5 March 2008, Forbes ranked Slim as the world's second-richest person, behind Warren Buffett and ahead of Bill Gates. On 11 March 2009, Forbes ranked Slim as the world's third-richest person, behind Gates and Buffett and ahead of Larry Ellison.

On 10 March 2010, Forbes once again reported that Slim had overtaken Gates as the world's richest person, with a net worth of US$53.5 billion (equivalent to US$79 billion in 2025). At the time, Gates and Buffett had a net worth of US$53 billion (equivalent to US$78.3 billion in 2025) and US$47 billion (equivalent to US$69.4 billion in 2025) respectively. He was the first Mexican to top the list. It was the first time in 16 years that the person on top of the list was not from the United States. It was also the first time the person at the top of the list was from an emerging economy. Between 2008 and 2010, Slim more than doubled his net worth from US$35 billion (equivalent to US$52.3 billion in 2025) to US$75 billion (equivalent to US$111 billion in 2025).

In March 2011, Forbes stated that Slim had maintained his position as the wealthiest person in the world, with his fortune estimated at US$74 billion (equivalent to US$106 billion in 2025).

In December 2012, according to the Bloomberg Billionaires Index, Carlos Slim Helú remained the world's richest person, with an estimated net worth of US$75.5 billion (equivalent to US$106 billion in 2025).

On 5 March 2013, Forbes stated that Slim was still maintaining his first-place position as the wealthiest person in the world, with an estimated net worth of US$73 billion (equivalent to US$101 billion in 2025). On 16 May 2013, Bloomberg L.P. ranked Slim the second-richest person in the world, after Bill Gates.

On 15 July 2014, Forbes announced that Slim had reclaimed the position of the wealthiest person in the world, with a fortune of US$79.6 billion (equivalent to US$108 billion in 2025).

In September 2014, Forbes listed Slim as number 1 on its list of billionaires, with a net worth of US$81.6 billion (equivalent to US$111 billion in 2025).

In December 2016, Slim's net worth was estimated to be US$48.1 billion (equivalent to US$64.5 billion in 2025).

In 2017, his net worth was reported to be US$54.5 billion (equivalent to US$71.6 billion in 2025).

In 2019, his net worth was said to be at least US$58.1 billion (equivalent to US$73.2 billion in 2025), making him the richest man in Mexico.

In October 2020, his net worth was estimated at US$53.7 billion (equivalent to US$66.8 billion in 2025).

In 2021, Forbes stated his net worth as US$73.3 billion (equivalent to US$87.1 billion in 2025).

=== Real estate ===
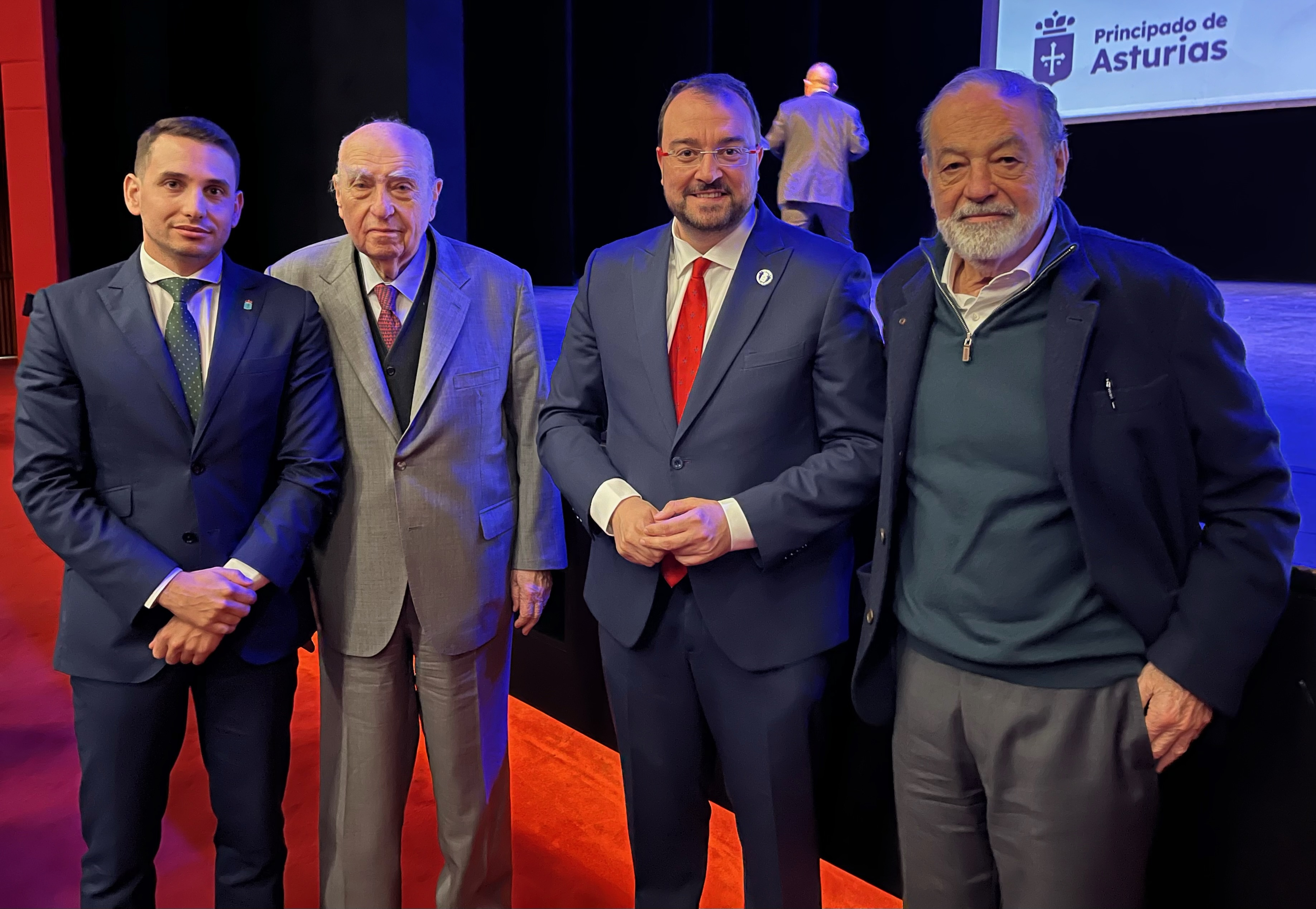
Carlos Slim, Adrián Barbón, José M. Sanguinetti, Juan M RiesgoVialás

Slim is an active real estate investor. His real estate holding company, Inmobiliaria Carso has developed, invested, owned and operated an extensive portfolio of residential and commercial real estate properties across Mexico since the 1960s. His real estate company constructed Plaza Carso in Mexico City, where most of his business ventures share a common headquarters address. Since the early 2000s to the mid-2010s, Slim has been making private real estate investments internationally beyond Mexico, particularly in Spain and the United States.

In May 2014, Slim opened Inbursa Aquarium, Latin America's largest aquarium. Slim owns the Duke Seamans mansion, a 1901 beaux arts house on 5th Avenue in New York City, which he bought for US$44 million in 2010 (equivalent to US$65 million in 2025). The mansion is 20,000 square feet and has 12 bedrooms, 14 bathrooms, and a doctor's office in the basement. In May 2015, he listed the property for sale at US$80 million (equivalent to US$109 million in 2025). In April 2015, Slim bought the Marquette Building in Detroit and purchased PepsiCo Americas Beverages headquarters in Somers, New York, for US$87 million (equivalent to US$118 million in 2025). Slim owns a second mansion in New York City at 10 West 56th Street, which he bought in 2011 for US$15.5 million (equivalent to US$22.2 million in 2025).

In March 2015, Slim began eyeing Spain as a potential investment destination, by purchasing cheap properties in Spain's real estate sector at rock-bottom prices in its ailing economy.

=== Criticism ===
Slim's immense wealth has been a subject of controversy, because it has been amassed in a developing country where average per capita income does not exceed US$14,500 (equivalent to US$21,683 in 2025) a year, and nearly 17% of the population lives in poverty. Critics claim that Slim is a monopolist, pointing to Telmex's control of 90% of the Mexican landline telephone market. Slim's wealth is the equivalent of roughly 5% of Mexico's annual economic output. Telmex, of which 49.1% is owned by Slim and his family, charges among the highest usage fees in the world, according to the Organisation for Economic Co-operation and Development.

According to Celso Garrido, economist at the Universidad Nacional Autónoma de México, Slim's domination of Mexico's conglomerates prevents the growth of smaller companies, resulting in a shortage of paying jobs, forcing many Mexicans to seek better lives in the U.S.

Slim was criticized by the Dutch minister of economic affairs, Henk Kamp, in 2013 for attempting to expand his telecommunications empire beyond the Americas by América Móvil's buy-out offer to KPN, a Dutch landline and mobile telecommunications operator. Kamp reiterated his criticisms of Slim stating: "an acquisition of KPN by a 'foreign company' could have consequences for the Netherlands' national security". Two years after Slim's failed bid to take over the company, mainly due to political intervention and Slim's paucity of interest in purchasing the company, Slim's América Móvil SAB began offering €2.25 billion (equivalent to €2.77 billion in 2023). América Móvil now controls a 21.1 percent stake of KPN with a market value of €3.1 billion (equivalent to €3.82 billion in 2023) as of 20 May 2015. Slim has been slowly decreasing his holdings since he was forced to withdraw a €7.2 billion bid (equivalent to €8.92 billion in 2023) for the Dutch phone line carrier in 2013 after negotiations collapsed.

In response to the criticism, Slim has stated, "When you live for others' opinions, you are dead. I don't want to live thinking about how I'll be remembered [by Mexican people]," claiming indifference about his position on Forbes list of the world's richest people. He has said he has no interest in becoming the world's richest person. When asked to explain his sudden increase in wealth at a press conference soon after Forbes annual rankings were published, he said, "The stock market goes up ... and down" and noted that his fortune could quickly drop.

== Awards ==
- Entrepreneurial Merit Medal of Honor in 1985 from Mexico's Chamber of Commerce.
- Commander in the Belgian Order of Leopold II
- Golden Plate Award of the American Academy of Achievement in 1994
- CEO of the year in 2003 by Latin Trade magazine
- CEO of the decade in 2004 by Latin Trade magazine
- Fundacion Telmex received in 2007 the National Sports Prize of Mexico for sports promotion
- In 2008, his philanthropy was recognized with the award of The National Order of the Cedar by the Lebanese government.
- In 2011, the Hispanic Society of America awarded Fundacion Carlos Slim the Sorolla Medal for its contribution to the arts and culture
- On 20 May 2012, Slim was awarded an honorary doctorate in public service from George Washington University.
- On 21 March 2020, he was awarded the Queen Sofía Spanish Institute Sophia Award for Excellence at an awards luncheon.

== See also ==
- List of Maronites

Honorary titles
| Preceded by Bill Gates | World's richest person 2010 – 2013 | Succeeded by Bill Gates |
