= List of banks in Mexico =

This is a list of banks in Mexico, including chartered banks, credit unions, trusts, and other financial services companies that offer banking services and may be popularly referred to as "banks".

== Central bank ==
- Bank of Mexico

== Mexican banks ==
- Actinver
- Banca Afirme
- Banca Mifel
- Banco Azteca
- Banco BASE
- Banco Bineo
- Banco Covalto
- Banco Dondé
- Banco Inmobiliario Mexicano
- Banco Invex
- Banco Multiva
- Banco Monex
- Banco Pagatodo
- Banco Plata
- Banco Ve por Más
- BanBajío
- BanCoppel
- Bancrea
- Banfeliz
- Bankaool
- Banorte
- BanRegio
- Bansí
- Compartamos Banco
- Consubanco
- Grupo Financiero Banamex
- Grupo Financiero Kapital
- Hey Banco
- Inbursa

== Foreign-owned banks ==
- American Express Bank
- Banco Falabella
- Banco Sabadell
- Banco Volkswagen México
- Bank of America
- Bank of China
- Bank Saderat Iran
- Barclays Mexico
- BBVA México, founded as Banco de Comercio (Bank of Commerce) or Bancomer, in 2000 Spanish bank BBVA was the majority shareholder until 2004 when it purchased all shares and wholly owned it.
- Citibank Mexico
- Credit Suisse
- Deutsche Bank
- HSBC México
- Industrial and Commercial Bank of China
- ING Mexico
- J. P. Morgan Chase
- Mizuho Bank Mexico
- MUFG
- Nubank
- Openbank
- Revolut
- Santander México, formerly Banco Santander Serfin.
- Scotiabank, The Bank of Nova Scotia purchased Mexico's Grupo Financiero Inverlat in 1992.
- Shinhan Bank
- Ualá
- UBS Bank

== Public banks ==
- Banco del Bienestar, previously known as Bansefi and as Pahnal before that

== Development banks ==
- Bancomext, SNC (Export - import bank)
- Banjercito, SNC (Army)
- Banobras, SNC (Subnational and project finance)
- Financiera Rural (Agriculture)
- Nafinsa, SNC
- SHF, SNC (Mortgage)

== Defunct banks ==
- ABC Capital (bought by Banco Ualá)
- Accendo Banco (failed)
- Agrofinanzas (bought and became Bankaool)
- Banco Amigo (bought by ABC Capital)
- Banco Autofin (bought by Grupo Financiero Kapital)
- Banca Confia (failed); acquired by Citibank Mexico
- Banca Cremi (bought and became Banco Unión)
- Banca Promex (begin as Banco de Zamora)
- Banca Serfin (merged with Banco Santander Mexicano); absorbed into Banco Santander Serfin
- Banco Bilbao Vizcaya (bought Bancomer)
- Banco Central Mexicano (failed, early 20th century)
- Banco de Londres, México y Sudamerica (first Mexican bank), later Banca Serfin)
- Banco Facil (merged with Sociedad Financiera de Objeto Limitado (Sofol) to form Consubanco)
- Banco Forjadores (bought by Banfeliz)
- Banco de Oriente (bought by BBVA)
- Banco del Atlántico (bought by BITAL, BITAL was later taken over by HSBC)
- Banco del Centro (BANCEN) or (BANCENTRO) (bought by Banorte)
- Banco del Sureste
- Banco Hipotecario
- Banco Internacional (bought by Prime and became BITAL)
- Banco Interacciones (bought by Banorte)
- Banco Longoria
- Banco Mexicano Somex (bought by Invermexico and became Banco Mexicano)
- Banco Mexicano (bought by Banco Santander and became Banco Santander Mexicano; now part of Banco Santander (Mexico))
- Banco Mercantil Mexicano (merged with Banco Nacional Mexicano to form Banco Nacional de México, 1884)
- Banco Nacional Mexicano (merged with Banco Mercantil Mexicano to form Banco Nacional de México, 1884)
- Banco Sofimex
- Banco Unión (failed and bought by Banorte)
- Banco Viltaza (sold to Inbursa)
- Bancreser (later Bancrecer)
- Banpaís (bought by Asemex)
- Banpeco (bought by BNCI)
- Banoro
- Banrural
- BBVA Probursa (merged with Bancomer and became BBVA Bancomer)
- Banco BCH (bought by Banco Unión)
- BITAL (taken over by HSBC)
- CI Banco (assets acquired by Banco Multiva)
- Crédito Méxicano
- KEB Hana Mexico (Sold Mexican unit to InvestaBank S.A.)
- Intercam (assets acquired by Grupo Financiero Kapital)
- IXE Banco (merged with Banorte)
- Grupo Bursatil Mexicano (bought by Banco del Atlántico)
- Multibanco Comermex (bought by Inverlat and became Comermex Inverlat) Scotiabank Inverlat
- Multibanco Mercantil de México
- Multibanco Mercantil Probursa (later BBVA Probursa)
- Prudential Bank (taken over by Actinver S. A.)
- Sociedad Financiera de Objeto Limitado (Sofol) (merged with Banco Facil to form Consubanco)
- Ziraat Bank Mexico (went bankrupt)
