= Signum Research =

Mexican financial analysis firm

Signum Research is an independent financial and stock market analysis firm, based in Mexico. It was founded in June 2008 in Mexico City. The firm's clients include private and institutional investors. Its main analytical focus areas are equity and bond markets. Through its analysts, Signum Research examines and forecasts the principal economic variables of the main world stock exchanges and the Mexican stock market. It also provides financial analysis for the Latin American stock market.

Signum Research's analysis has been mentioned in media outlets such as El Economista, El Financiero-Bloomberg Television, ADN 40, Reuters, Expansión Magazine, Inmobiliare Magazine, Onda Inversión, El Horizonte Newspaper, Sentido Común, and Real State Market & Lifestyle Magazine, amongst others.

The firm has obtained recognition from the Mexican Stock Exchange (BMV), the Institutional Stock Exchange (BIVA), Latibex, and institutions of higher education such as the National Polytechnic Institute of Mexico (IPN).

Signum Research also promotes financial education and culture through conferences and courses. The company organises evaluation courses and presentations on the stock market at the Mexican Stock Exchange and the Institutional Stock Exchange; it also organises presentations on numerous publicly traded companies.

== Services ==
The company currently provides four courses:

- Valuation of companies and investment projects
- Investment portfolio analysis
- Risk analysis
- Investor relations
