= Indice de Precios y Cotizaciones =

Mexican stock market index

Coordinates: 19°26′N 99°8′W

The Índice de Precios y Cotizaciones (IPC) is the weighted measurement index of 35 stocks traded on the Bolsa Mexicana de Valores. The recomposition of the index has its methodology originating and exposing on the BMV, and may change every quarter.

== Components ==
The companies as of 29 October 2021 are:

| Name | Symbol | Sector | Industry | Sub-Industry |
|---|---|---|---|---|
| Arca Continental | AC | Consumer Staples | Beverages | Soft Drinks |
| ALFA | ALFA A | Industrials | Industrial Conglomerates | Industrial Conglomerates |
| Alsea | ALSEA | Consumer Discretionary | Hotels, Restaurants & Leisure | Restaurants |
| América Móvil | AMXB | Telecommunication Services | Wireless Telecommunications | Wireless Telecommunications |
| Grupo Aeroportuario del Sureste | ASUR B | Industrials | Transportation Infrastructure | Airport Services |
| Banco del Bajío | BBAJIO O | Financial | Banks | Diversified Banks |
| Grupo Bimbo | BIMBO A | Consumer Staples | Food Products | Packaged Foods & Meats |
| Bolsa Mexicana de Valores | BOLSA A | Financials | Diversified Financial Services | Specialized Finance |
| Cemex | CEMEX CPO | Materials | Construction Materials | Construction Materials |
| Becle | CUERVO | Consumer Staples | Beverages | Distilled Spirits |
| Grupo Elektra | ELEKTRA | Financials | Banks | Diversified Banks |
| FEMSA | FEMSA UBD | Consumer Staples | Beverages | Soft Drinks |
| Grupo Aeroportuario del Pacífico | GAP B | Industrials | Transportation Infrastructure | Airport Services |
| Grupo Carso | GCARSO A1 | Industrials | Industrial Conglomerates | Industrial Conglomerates |
| Grupo Cementos de Chihuahua | GCC | Materials | Construction Materials | Construction Materials |
| Inbursa | GFINBUR O | Financial | Banks | Diversified Banks |
| Banorte | GFNORTE O | Financial | Banks | Diversified Banks |
| Grupo México | GMEXICO B | Materials | Metals & Mining | Diversified Metals & Mining |
| Gruma | GRUMA B | Consumer Staples | Food Products | Packaged Foods & Meats |
| Kimberly-Clark de México | KIMBER A | Consumer Staples | Household Products | Household Products |
| Coca-Cola FEMSA | KOFUBL | Consumer Staples | Beverages | Soft Drinks |
| Genomma Lab Internacional | LAB B | Healthcare | Pharmaceuticals | Pharmaceuticals |
| El Puerto de Liverpool | LIVEPOL C-1 | Consumer Discretionary | Multiline Retail | Department Stores and Malls |
| Megacable | MEGA CPO | Consumer Discretionary | Media | Cable & Satellite |
| Grupo Aeroportuario Centro Norte | OMA B | Industrials | Transportation Infrastructure | Airport Services |
| Orbia | ORBIA | Materials | Chemicals | Commodity Chemicals |
| Peñoles | PE&OLES | Materials | Metals & Mining | Precious Metals & Minerals |
| Pinfra | PINFRA | Industrials | Construction & Engineering | Construction & Engineering |
| Quálitas | Q | Financials | Insurance | Property & Casualty Insurance |
| Regional | R A | Financial | Banks | Diversified Banks |
| Televisa | TLEVISA CPO | Consumer Discretionary | Media | Broadcasting |
| Corporación Inmobiliaria Vesta | VESTA | Financials | Real Estate Management & Development | Real Estate Development |
| Volaris | VOLAR A | Industrials | Airlines | Airlines |
| Walmart de México y Centroamérica | WALMEX | Consumer Staples | Food & Staples Retailing | Hypermarkets and Super Centers |

== Annual Returns ==
The following table shows the annual development of the IPC since 1991.

| Year | Closing level | Change in index in points | Change in index in % |
|---|---|---|---|
| 1991 | 1,431.46 | | |
| 1992 | 1,759.44 | 327.98 | 22.91 |
| 1993 | 2,602.63 | 843.19 | 47.92 |
| 1994 | 2,375.66 | −226.93 | −8.72 |
| 1995 | 2,778.47 | 402.81 | 16.96 |
| 1996 | 3,361.03 | 582.56 | 20.96 |
| 1997 | 5,229.35 | 1,868.32 | 55.59 |
| 1998 | 3,959.66 | −1,269.69 | −24.28 |
| 1999 | 7,129.88 | 3,170.22 | 80.06 |
| 2000 | 5,652.19 | −1,477.69 | −20.73 |
| 2001 | 6,372.28 | 720.09 | 12.74 |
| 2002 | 6,127.09 | −245.19 | −3.85 |
| 2003 | 8,795.28 | 2,668.19 | 43.55 |
| 2004 | 12,917.88 | 4,122,60 | 46.87 |
| 2005 | 17,802.71 | 4,884.83 | 37.81 |
| 2006 | 26,448.32 | 8,645.61 | 48.56 |
| 2007 | 29,536.83 | 3,088.51 | 11.68 |
| 2008 | 22,380.32 | −7,158.51 | −24.23 |
| 2009 | 32,120.47 | 9,740.15 | 43.52 |
| 2010 | 38,550.79 | 6,430.32 | 20.02 |
| 2011 | 37,077.52 | −1,473.27 | −3.82 |
| 2012 | 43,705.83 | 6,628.31 | 17.88 |
| 2013 | 42,727.09 | −978.74 | −2.24 |
| 2014 | 43,145.66 | 418.57 | 0.98 |
| 2015 | 42,977.50 | −168.16 | −0.39 |
| 2016 | 45,642.90 | 2,665.40 | 6.20 |
| 2017 | 49,354.40 | 3,711.50 | 8.13 |
| 2018 | 41,640.30 | −7,714.10 | −15.63 |
| 2019 | 43,541.00 | 1,900.70 | 4.56 |
| 2020 | 44,066.90 | 525.90 | 1.21 |
| 2021 | 53,272.43 | 9,205.55 | 20.89 |
| 2022 | 48,463.86 | −4,808.57 | −9.03 |
| 2023 | 57,386.25 | 8,922.39 | 18.41 |
| 2024 | 49,513.27 | −7,872.98 | −13.72 |
| 2025 | 64,308.29 | 14,795.02 | 29.88 |
