= Genomma Lab Internacional =

Mexican pharmaceutical company

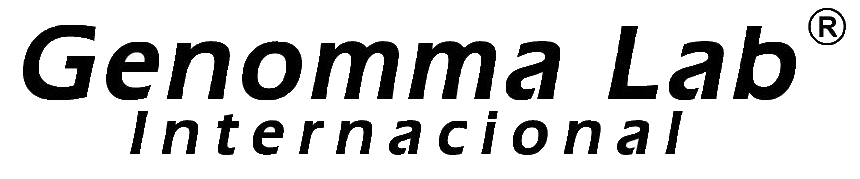
- Type: Public (BMV: LAB)
- Industry: Cosmetics
- Founded: 1996
- Headquarters: Mexico, Mexico City,
- Key people: Rodrigo Alonso Herrera Aspra (CEO)
- Products: Development, commercialization, and promotion of personal care products and over-the-counter (OTC) medications.
- Revenue: MXN $9,799.7 million 2013
- Website: genommalab.com

Genomma Lab Internacional or simply Genomma Lab is a Mexican company, founded in 1996, dedicated to the commercialization of OTC medications and dermocosmetic products. It is part of the Índice de Precios y Cotizaciones, the main stock index of the Mexican Stock Exchange. It is one of the leading pharmaceutical companies in the country.

Genomma Lab Internacional, led by its owner Rodrigo Alonso Herrera Aspra, recorded net sales of 9,799.7 million Mexican pesos, equivalent to 756.0 million USD in 2012, achieving a 21.6% growth compared to 2011. Currently, Genomma Lab operates in 15 countries outside Mexico and has achieved success by replicating its business model.

== History ==
- 1996: Established as a direct-to-consumer marketing company with in-house production capacity for infomercials.
- 1999: Restructures operations, shifting its business model to a vertical platform for the development of personal care and over-the-counter (OTC) medications, establishes a network of distributors and wholesalers to place its products at strategic points of sale. Changes its advertising strategy from infomercials to 10–30 second TV spots.
- 2003: Begins strengthening organic growth through the development of new brands and products. This year it started selling to pharmaceutical wholesalers.
- 2004: Nexxus Capital, a Mexican private equity fund manager, acquires 30% of Genomma Lab Internacional. With Nexxus Capital’s entry, Genomma Lab begins institutionalization.
- 2005: Starts international expansion, with first sales in Peru.
- 2006: Expands executive team, strengthening operations in Mexico.
- 2007: Expands product portfolio through new developments and line extensions.
- 2008: On June 18, 2008, Genomma Lab Internacional announces its Initial Public Offering (IPO) on the Mexican Stock Exchange. In December of that year, operations began in Colombia.
- 2009: Acquires Medicinas y Medicamentos Nacionales, and brands Jockey Club, Flor de Naranja Sanborns, Teatrical, and Henna Egipcia. Launches generic medicines line Primer Nivel.
- 2010: Acquires brands Nasalub, Micotex, Ossart, English Leather, Galaflex, Affair, and Santé. Begins operations in Brazil and the United States, expanding its international presence to 14 countries.
- 2011: Acquires brands Vanart, Pomada de la Campana, Wildroot, Alert, and Nórdiko.
- 2012: Acquires brands Fermodyl, Zan Zusi, Altiva, Amara, Larizá, Bioskin, and XL-3 in Mexico; Piecidex in Argentina; and Dermaglós in Brazil.
- 2013: Acquires Tafirol in Argentina and Losec A, Oxigricol, Mopral, Estomacurol, Xyloproct, Xyloderm, Passiflorine, and Ah-Micol in Mexico. Enters the Sustainable IPC Index and Morgan Stanley EM Latin America and Mexico Index.
- 2015: Begins a turnaround process to strengthen the business model.
- 2017: Obtains credits from the IFC (World Bank) and IDB Invest (Inter-American Development Bank) to finance the most modern manufacturing plant in Latin America.
- 2018: Issues debt certificate for 2.45 billion pesos and becomes one of the leading global skincare companies.

== Controversy ==
Genomma Lab was fined in July 2013 for 2,033,000 Mexican pesos for misleading advertising of one of its products. Earlier that year, in January, PROFECO (Federal Consumer Protection Agency) initiated proceedings for violations of the Federal Consumer Protection Law. As the company failed to provide proof supporting the advertised claims, the agency ordered a precautionary suspension of advertising for the product.

The company stated that it "has the necessary elements to demonstrate the brand’s quality to the authority". However, no proof of the product’s effectiveness relative to the advertising has been presented, which led Genomma Lab to issue an apology days later, stating that "we aim to ensure that the satisfaction of millions of Tío Nacho users can reach 100%, because for us, even one dissatisfied person is enough to take serious action".

== See also ==
- Oriflame
- L'avante Paris
