= Totalplay =

Mexican cable system operator

Totalplay Telecomunicaciones, S.A.P.I. de C.V.
- Traded as: BIVA: TPLAY
- Industry: Telecommunications
- Founded: 2004 (by lusacell); 2010 (by Grupo Salinas)
- Headquarters: Mexico City, Mexico
- Area served: Mexico; Colombia
- Products: Cable, telephone, Internet service provider
- Parent: Grupo Salinas
- Website: www.totalplay.com.mx

Totalplay is a Mexican telecommunication company owned by Grupo Salinas and operated by Grupo Totalplay, offers cable television, fiber optic internet and fixed telephony services in the Triple and Quadruple play market.

== History ==
In 2004 the mobile phone company Grupo lusacell (now AT&T México) would introduce the optical fiber network throughout Mexico.

During the expansion of optical fiber, they would begin to offer broadband and VoIP services, as well as pay television under Internet Protocol television.

In September 2010, Totalplay Telecomunicaciones, S.A. de C.V. was officially founded after an agreement between lusacell and Grupo Salinas, starting with beta users who would test the initial service. It would also serve as a replacement for the failed DTT service Hi-tv. Totalplay would only offer Live TV and Video on Demand services, and in 2011 Totalplay would be available for the Mexican market offering direct fiber-to-the-home (FTTH), high-speed broadband, HD and interactive TV.

In 2014 Grupo Salinas would acquire all of Totalplay after the purchase of lusacell by AT&T Latin America, in June 2021 the company would create its Colombian subsidiary Totalplay Colombia which by September 2022 had 6,000 users in the metropolitan area of Bogotá, Totalplay would be listed on the Bolsa Institucional de Valores (BIVA) on November 22, 2021. on 1 November 2022, the Totalplay TV option for laptops would stop working.

On April 2, 2025, Totalplay announced an increase of 110 pesos for every additional 100 GB of consumption in its "symmetrical" internet packages which will be offered from April 15, this would generate several complaints among many users of the Totalplay service and a subsequent a tweet in response to upset users to clarify the issue of rising costs. PROFECO, prohibited the company from changing its symmetrical internet plans without user authorization, Totalplay assured PROFECO that this increase is due to the abuse of some users to resell and redistribute the service illegally, PROFECO reminded the company that it should comply with its clauses and adhesion contracts with its users, which allow them to terminate them for illegal use of the service and for subcontracting and marketing them.

== Services ==
Totalplay-offers pay television service, VoD, fiber optic internet and fixed telephony in its normal package, including interactive television with various streaming platforms. It also offers the Totalplay Hogar Seguro (Secure House) service, which includes exterior cameras and alarms.

=== Totalplay Empresarial ===
Totalplay Empresarial is the business service for businesses and companies which includes pay television, internet (SD-WAN under the UNNO sub-brand), cybersecurity, etc., as well as alarms and security cameras.

== Coverage ==
=== In Mexico ===
- Mexico City
  - Greater Mexico City
- Aguascalientes
  - Aguascalientes City
- Baja California
  - Tijuana
  - Mexicali
  - Ensenada
  - Rosarito
- Coahuila
  - Saltillo
  - Torreón
- Chiapas
  - Tuxtla Gutiérrez
- Chihuahua
  - Chihuahua City
  - Ciudad Juárez
- State of Mexico
  - Toluca de Lerdo
  - Greater Toluca
- Guanajuato
  - León
  - Celaya
  - Irapuato
  - San Francisco del Rincón
- Hidalgo
  - Pachuca
- Jalisco
  - Guadalajara
  - Puerto Vallarta
- Michoacán
  - Morelia
- Morelos
  - Cuernavaca
- Nayarit
  - Tepic
- Nuevo León
  - Monterrey
- Puebla
  - Puebla de Zaragoza
- Querétaro
  - Querétaro City
- Quintana Roo
  - Cancún
  - Playa del Carmen
  - Tulum
- San Luis Potosí
  - San Luis Potosí City
- Oaxaca
  - Oaxaca de Juárez
- Sinaloa
  - Los Mochis
  - Culiacán
  - Mazatlán
- Sonora
  - Hermosillo
  - Navojoa
  - Ciudad Obregón
- Tabasco
  - Villahermosa
- Tamaulipas
  - Matamoros
  - Nuevo Laredo
  - Reynosa
  - Tampico
- Tlaxcala
  - Tlaxcala de Xicohténcatl
- Veracruz
  - Veracruz City
  - Coatzacoalcos
  - Orizaba
  - Tuxpan
  - Xalapa
  - Poza Rica
- Yucatán
  - Mérida

=== In Colombia ===
- Cundinamarca Department
  - Bogotá

== See also ==
- izzi
- Megacable
