= GigaCloud Technology =

American B2B e-commerce and logistics company

GigaCloud Technology Inc.
- Type: Public
- Traded as: Nasdaq: GCT; BMV: GCTN
- Industry: E-commerce; logistics; supply chain
- Founded: 2006; 20 years ago
- Founder: Larry Lei Wu
- Headquarters: El Monte, California, United States
- Key people: Larry Lei Wu (chairman & CEO); Iman Schrock (president); Erica Wei (CFO)
- Products: GigaCloud Marketplace
- Services: Cross-border B2B marketplace, fulfillment, last-mile delivery
- Revenue: US$1.1 billion (2024)
- Net income: US$105 million (2024)
- Website: Official website

GigaCloud Technology Inc. (Nasdaq: GCT) is an American e-commerce company that helps retailers buy and sell big and bulky items such as furniture, appliances, and fitness equipment. They own a business-to-business online marketplace and act as a middleman by handling sales, logistics and also delivery to end customers. GigaCloud is headquartered in El Monte, California, and is listed on the Nasdaq stock exchange since August 2022.

== History ==
GigaCloud was founded in 2006 by Larry Lei Wu, who has served as chairman and chief executive officer since inception. The company was originally named Oriental Standard Human Resources, but changed its name in 2021. It went public in the U.S. on August 18, 2022, raising about $36–41 million.

In September 2023, GigaCloud offered to buy the bankrupt Noble House Home Furnishings for $85 million, and the deal was completed on November 1, 2023.

GigaCloud also acquired Apexis, a Florida company that built digital catalog and product display software for furniture retailers, in November 2023 for about $10 million. It later rebranded the business as “Wonder.”

== Business ==
GigaCloud runs the GigaCloud Marketplace, a platform where businesses can buy and sell large items across countries. Many of the bulky products originate from Asia, where they are produced by factories there, while they are sold to end customers in the United States and Europe. GigaCloud combines product listings, payments, storage, shipping, and final delivery to the retailer’s customer in one system. The company calls this model “supplier-fulfilled retailing,” meaning manufacturers ship products straight to customers, while GigaCloud handles the logistics in between.

The company uses a dual-class share structure. Class A shares have one vote per share, while Class B shares have ten votes per share and are held by founder Larry Lei Wu, giving him majority voting control following the IPO. In September 2024 the board authorized a $46 million share repurchase program, which was later increased by $16 million in April 2025, and in August 2025 the company announced a new three-year $111 million buyback program replacing the prior plan. In November 2024, Forbes ranked GigaCloud number 1 on its “Most Successful Small-Cap” list.

== Controversies ==
In September 2023, the short-seller firm Culper Research published a report that accused GigaCloud of overstated operations and engaged in undisclosed related-party transactions. GigaCloud denied the claims. In May 2024 a second report from Grizzly Research made similar allegations which GigaCloud also disputed.

In late 2023, some shareholders sued GigaCloud, claiming the company misinformed them about business size and use of AI. In January 2025, a New York judge said some of the claims could continue while others were thrown out. Later that year, lawyers filed a proposed settlement that still needs court approval.
