= List of largest Mexican companies =

This article lists the largest companies in Mexico in terms of their revenue, net profit and total assets, according to the American business magazines Fortune and Forbes. It also includes a list provided by Global Database, a UK-based company and B2B data provider.

== 2023 Global Database list ==
This list displays the top Mexican companies by revenue, as provided by Global Database, which ranks the largest companies in Mexico by annual revenue. The figures below are given in billions of US dollars and refer to the fiscal year 2023. Also listed are the headquarters location, number of employees worldwide, and industry sector of each company.

Rank	Name	Industry	Revenue (USD billions)	Employees	Headquarters
1	Pemex	Oil and Gas	96.98	128,616	Mexico City
2	América Móvil	Telecommunications	48.30	183,000+	Mexico City
3	Walmart	Retail	50.09	230,000+	Mexico City
4	Fomento Económico Mexicano	Beverages	14.50	350,000+	Monterrey
5	Comisión Federal de Electricidad	Electric utility	6.87	90,000	Mexico City

== 2023 Fortune list ==
This list displays all 3 Mexican companies in the Fortune Global 500, which ranks the world's largest companies by annual revenue. The figures below are given in millions of US dollars and are for the fiscal year 2023. Also listed are the headquarters location, net profit, number of employees worldwide and industry sector of each company.

Rank	Fortune 500 rank	Name	Industry	Revenue (USD millions)	Profits (USD millions)	Employees	Headquarters
1	80	Pemex	Oil and Gas	118,536	4,994	120,054	Mexico City
2	349	América Móvil	Telecommunications	42,724	3,787	176,014	Mexico City
3	454	Fomento Económico Mexicano	Beverages	33,481	1,189	354,309	Monterrey

== 2023 Forbes list ==
This list is based on the Forbes Global 2000, which ranks the world's 2,000 largest publicly traded companies. The Forbes list takes into account a multitude of factors, including the revenue, net profit, total assets and market value of each company; each factor is given a weighted rank in terms of importance when considering the overall ranking. The table below also lists the headquarters location and industry sector of each company. The figures are in billions of US dollars and are for the year 2023.

Rank	Forbes 2000 rank	Name	Headquarters	Revenue (billions US$)	Profit (billions US$)	Assets (billions US$)	Value (billions US$)	Industry
1	177	América Móvil	Mexico City	43.57	3.84	88.24	66.81	Telecommunications
2	312	Fomento Económico Mexicano	Monterrey	35.86	3.46	44.9	35.05	Beverages
3	375	Banorte	Monterrey	16.82	2.26	106.23	24.74	Finance
4	496	Grupo México	Mexico City	13.93	3.26	32.66	37.81	Mining
5	610	Grupo Bimbo	Mexico City	20.74	2.36	18.73	24.62	Food processing
6	1048	Inbursa	Mexico City	4	1.1	31.1	14.72	Financial services
7	1071	Cemex	Monterrey	15.93	0.58	27.49	9.9	Building material
8	1130	Arca Continental	Monterrey	10..8	0.82	13.84	17.42	Beverages
9	1188	Grupo Carso	Mexico City	10.18	1.03	13.29	12.57	Conglomerate
10	1384	ALFA	Monterrey	18.27	0.73	14.36	3.1	Conglomerate
11	1558	El Puerto de Liverpool	Mexico City	8.75	0.86	12.1	8.12	Retail
12	1606	Grupo Elektra	Mexico City	8.19	(-0.37)	21.8	10.42	Finance
13	1743	Fibra Uno	Mexico City	1.17	1.17	17.36	5.29	Real Estate

== 2019 Fortune list ==
This list displays all 4 Mexican companies in the Fortune Global 500, which ranks the world's largest companies by annual revenue. The figures below are given in millions of US dollars and are for the fiscal year 2018. Also listed are the headquarters location, net profit, number of employees worldwide and industry sector of each company.

Rank	Fortune 500 rank	Name	Industry	Revenue (USD millions)	Profits (USD millions)	Employees	Headquarters
1	95	Pemex	Oil and Gas	87,403	−9,378	131,108	Mexico City
2	196	América Móvil	Telecommunications	53,978	2,733	194,431	Mexico City
3	443	Comisión Federal de Electricidad	Electric utility	28,457	2,322	91,369	Mexico City
4	488	Fomento Económico Mexicano	Beverages	25,679	1,247	297,073	Monterrey

== 2019 Forbes list ==
This list is based on the Forbes Global 2000, which ranks the world's 2,000 largest publicly traded companies. The Forbes list takes into account a multitude of factors, including the revenue, net profit, total assets and market value of each company; each factor is given a weighted rank in terms of importance when considering the overall ranking. The table below also lists the headquarters location and industry sector of each company. The figures are in billions of US dollars and are for the year 2018.

Rank	Forbes 2000 rank	Name	Headquarters	Revenue (billions US$)	Profit (billions US$)	Assets (billions US$)	Value (billions US$)	Industry
1	189	América Móvil	Mexico City	53.1	2.5	72.6	52.4	Telecommunications
2	429	Fomento Económico Mexicano	Monterrey	25.1	1.3	29.3	34.5	Beverages
3	473	Banorte	Monterrey	10.4	1.7	82.7	18.8	Finance
4	594	Grupo México	Mexico City	10.5	1.3	26.9	24.3	Mining
5	975	Cemex	Monterrey	14.4	0.5	28.1	7.4	Building materials
6	1030	ALFA	Monterrey	19.0	0.7	18.8	5.5	Conglomerate
7	1118	Inbursa	Mexico City	4.1	0.9	25.9	10.2	Finance
8	1230	Grupo Elektra	Mexico City	5.4	0.8	14.1	12.7	Conglomerate
9	1306	Grupo Bimbo	Mexico City	15.0	0.3	13.4	10.1	Food processing
10	1419	Arca Continental	Monterrey	8.3	0.5	12.1	10.0	Beverages
11	1508	El Puerto de Liverpool	Mexico City	7.0	0.6	8.9	8.5	Retail
12	1860	Fibra Uno	Mexico City	1.0	0.9	12.3	5.8	Real estate
13	1964	Grupo Carso	Mexico City	5.0	0.5	7.0	8.9	Conglomerate

== See also ==
- List of companies of Mexico
- List of largest companies by revenue
