= BanRegio =

Mexican regional banking group

Banregio Grupo Financiero, S.A.B. de C.V.
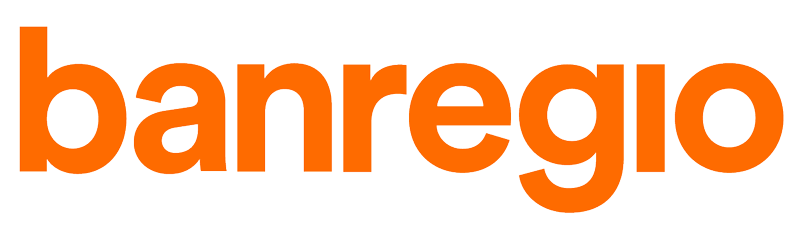
- Company type: Sociedad Anónima Bursátil de Capital Variable
- Traded as: BMV: RA O
- Industry: Finance and Insurance
- Founded: 1994; 32 years ago
- Headquarters: San Pedro Garza García, Mexico
- Number of locations: 159 branches
- Area served: 44 cities in 19 Mexican states
- Key people: Manuel Rivero Santos (Chairman); Manuel Rivero Zambrano (CEO)
- Services: business loans, leasing, factoring, working capital loans
- Revenue: ▲ Mx$ 7.7 billion (2014) ▲US$ 563 million
- Net income: ▲ Mx$ 3.6 billion (2019) ▲US$ 123 million
- Total assets: ▲ Mx$ 141.9 billion (2019) ▲US$ 6.5 billion
- Number of employees: 3,000
- Subsidiaries: Banco Regional; Start BanRegio
- Website: www.banregio.com

Banregio Grupo Financiero, S.A.B. de C.V., doing business as BanRegio (Banco Regional S.A.), is a Mexican regional bank headquartered in San Pedro Garza García, near Monterrey, Mexico. It offers services, such as business loans, leasing, factoring and working capital loans, mainly for small and medium-sized companies.

BanRegio operates 156 branches in 44 cities in central and northern Mexico. It has 298 ATMs and more than 12,000 points-of-sale terminals. More than 80% of its revenues come from services from small and medium-sized companies. Its performing loan portfolio is US$4 billion, almost half of it is originated in Nuevo Leon.

Banregio Grupo Financiero was listed on the Mexican Stock Exchange on 2011 and is a constituent of the IPC, the main benchmark index of Mexican stocks. In 2015, Banregio has helped more than 60,000 small and medium-sized enterprises (SMEs) with the intention of guiding Banregio on a different path than traditional banking. The mission is not easy for banks since international organizations recommend banks to open more the key of credit to small businesses, but the director Manuel Rivero Zambrano considers that credit should not necessarily be the main business of banking. In 2020, The Banker named Banregio as the best bank in Mexico for its performance entering the ranking of the "1000 best banks in the world" through a publication with a 50th anniversary edition of The Banker listing the best banks for their performance.
