= Mexican Derivatives Exchange =

- Type: Derivatives exchange
- Location: Mexico City, Mexico
- Coordinates: 19°26′N 99°8′W
- Founded: 15 December 1998; 27 years ago
- Owner: BMV Group
- Currency: Mexican peso
- No. of listings: Futures and options
- Website: www.mexder.com.mx

The Mexican Derivatives Exchange (MexDer) is an futures and options exchange in Mexico, located in the same building as the Mexican Stock Exchange and a subsidiary of the same owning group.

== History ==
MexDer claims that its formation was first formally discussed in 1994. It actually began operations December 15th, 1998.

In September 1999, the Board of Directors of MexDer approved a project to create an electronic trading system. Before that time it had been operating as an open-outcry market. The new system, "SENTRA-DERIVADOS," was a client–server system using a TCP/IP network.

In March 2004, MexDer moved its electronic trading to the Spanish "S/MART" system.

In 2009, MexDer trading in MoNeT matching engine (MoNeT In Spanish: Motor de Negociación Transaccional), this engine is an HA HPC Cluster (https://resources.sei.cmu.edu/asset_files/Presentation/2013_017_001_297884.pdf).

== Organization ==
MexDer has a typical corporate structure. It also authorizes special relationships with certain kinds of entities:

- Brokers
- Clearing Members, "trusts that participate as shareholders of MexDer and contribute to Asigna's capital; their purpose is to settle and, when applicable, trade Futures and Options contracts in MexDer on behalf of clients. ... Clearing Members have their own capital, they specialize in the evaluation of counterpart [sic.] risk, manage guarantees and, in order to avoid conflicts of interest, they keep proprietary accounts completely separate from third-party accounts."
- Market Makers

== Products ==
MexDer offers a different asset class derivatives divides in Futures, Options and Swaps.

- Mexican Local Stocks (SSF's and Options):

ALFA | ASUR | CEMEX | FEMSA | GAP | GCARSO | GMEXICO | KOF | LALA | MEXCHEM | PE&OLES | PINFRA | WALMEX

- Local ETF Tracker (SSF):

MEXTRAC

- Foreign exchange:

USD/MXN and EUR/MXN futures and USD/MXN Options.

- IPC Index [MEXBOL]:

One big futures contract and a mini contract (5 times less) with options in big contract.

- Bonds:

TIIE | CETE | Mexican UMS Bonds

- Commodities:

Yellow Corn Futures in Mexican Pesos [MXN] The price of this future contract is tied to CME Mini Corn Future Contract and USD/MXN)

== See also ==
- Bolsa Mexicana de Valores
- Economy of Mexico
- List of futures exchanges
- Peso
