= BanBajío =

Mexican banking company

Banco del Bajío, S.A. Institución de Banca Múltiple
- Type: Sociedad Anónima Bursátil de Capital Variable
- Traded as: BMV: BBAJIO O
- Industry: Finance and Insurance
- Founded: 1994; 32 years ago
- Headquarters: León, Guanajuato
- Number of locations: 295 branches
- Area served: 28 Mexican states
- Key people: Edgardo del Rincon (CEO)
- Services: business loans, leasing, factoring, working capital loans
- Number of employees: 4,000
- Website: www.bb.com.mx

Banco del Bajío, S.A. Institución de Banca Múltiple, doing business as BanBajío (Banco del Bajío), is a Mexican bank headquartered in León, Guanajuato, Mexico. It is one of the major banks in Mexico and fastest growing local banks in the country. It is the 8th largest in terms of customer deposits and provided lending services.

== Overview ==
The bank was created on December 2, 1994 in León, Guanajuato. The bank started out small but since its inception has grown to cover 90% of the states in Mexico. In 2017, the bank sought an IPO to be listed on the stock exchange as a result of their increase in revenue and size.

The bank provides various commercial banking products and services to individuals, companies, governments, and SMEs in Mexico. It offers checking, payroll, and minor accounts; and credit cards and mortgage credits. The company also provides investment, foreign exchange, and savings fund services; car, lifetime, home, fraud protection, multiple business, and personal accident insurance services; and electronic and mobile banking services.

BanBajío has directed its efforts to two priority niches: micro, small and medium enterprises, and the agri-food sector. Today, it is a multi-regional bank with a presence in 90% of the states of the Mexican Republic and a strong influence in the triangle of the states of Monterrey, Guadalajara and D.F.

== See also ==
- List of banks in Mexico
