= Fibra Uno =

Mexican real estate investment trust

Fibra Uno (Fibra Uno Administración SA de CV) is a Mexican real estate investment trust (REIT). It acquires, develops, and operates real estate projects through the Logistics and Light Manufacturing sectors. The company was founded in 2010; its head offices are in Mexico City. As of June 2023, the CEO is André El-Mann Arazi, and ownership is held mainly by André and his son Charles; Fibra Uno has 1,000 employees and ranks 1742 on the Forbes Global 2000 list. For 2023, Revenue was ca. US$1.2 billion, assets were ca. US$17.4 billion, and profits were ca. US$1.2 B.

== History ==
Fibra UNO, also known as FUNO, was founded by the El-Mann brothers – Max, Moisés and André – in 2011, as the first real-estate investment trust listed on the Mexican Stock Exchange (BMV). The business model of FUNO enabled public and private investors to participate in diversified real-estate portfolios, which increased liquidity and professionalization of the sector.

Under the direction of El-Mann and the Technical Committee, which his brothers also joined, FUNO expanded its portfolio to more than 600 properties in Mexico, including shopping centers, industrial parks and corporate buildings, during its first decade of operation. Analysts in the real-estate market have noted that the consolidation of the Fibras sector, led by FUNO and supported by major firms such as Macquarie and Terrafina, has contributed to the strengthening of real-estate investment infrastructure in Mexico.

According to the Mexican magazine Expansión, in 2022 Fibra UNO consolidated itself as a relevant actor in the growth of Real-Estate Investment Trusts (Fibras), promoting institutional investment in real estate and positioning itself among the main owners of commercial and industrial assets in Mexico.

Various financial media have pointed to the role of the El-Mann Arazi family in positioning FUNO as one of the largest real-estate trusts in Latin America, with more than 623 properties and more than 10,000 tenants in eleven years.

== Controversies and legal investigations ==
The El-Mann brothers, founders of Fibra UNO; Moisés (chairman), André (chief executive) and Max (director and board member) have been implicated in various legal accusations described below.

=== Opinion of offense by the CNBV (FUNO) ===
In 2021, the National Banking and Securities Commission (CNBV) issued an opinion of an offense related to Fibra UNO (FUNO) and its directors and some of its shareholders. The opinion arose from alleged omissions in the disclosure of material information to the market.

According to reports, the CNBV maintained that neither the issuer nor its founders had timely informed the Mexican Stock Exchange (BMV) and the investing public about events that could have impacted FUNO’s share price, among them:

1. The blocking of bank accounts of the trust and some shareholders.
2. The existence of an investigation file at the Attorney General’s Office (FGR) related to alleged operations with illicit-origin resources.
3. The reparatory agreement via discretionary opportunity criterion to the three founding El Mann brothers, owners and executives, who handed over two checks for one billion pesos each as part of the Telra Realty–Infonavit case so their accounts would be unfrozen.

The CNBV considered that these facts could constitute information with potential impact on the stock market, which should have been disclosed as a “relevant event” under the Securities Market Law. As a result, the CNBV forwarded the opinion of offense to the FGR for the continuation of the appropriate procedure.

=== UIF investigation for operations with illicit-origin resources ===
In February 2020, the Financial Intelligence Unit (UIF), led by Santiago Nieto Castillo, initiated an investigation regarding financial movements linked to the founders, executives and board members of Fibra UNO (FUNO). The inquiry began on January 27, 2020, derived from financial movements.

As part of the procedure, the UIF requested from the CNBV detailed information about the operations and accounts of those indicated, in order to trace the destination of the resources and establish possible links to money-laundering or tax-evasion.

=== Morning conference of the President of the Republic and delivery of two billion pesos ===
On February 10, 2020, during the morning government conference of Mexico, the FGR reported the delivery of a check for 2,000 million pesos to the Instituto para Devolver al Pueblo lo Robado (Institute to Return to the People What Was Stolen) (INDEP). The president Andrés Manuel López Obrador stated that the case exemplified the recovery of resources coming from “white-collar crime”, and that the amount would be destined to public health and welfare programs.

According to Mexico’s Parliamentary Gazette of the House of Representatives, the amount corresponded to the reparation of damage derived from a reparatory agreement in which the founders of FUNO, Max, André and Moisés El-Mann Arazi, participated.

Press publications indicated that the stated amount was integrated via two checks of one billion pesos each, issued by Max and André El-Mann Arazi, which allowed the FGR to conclude an investigation linked to operations with illicit-origin resources.

=== Blocking of Fibra Uno accounts by the UIF ===
In October 2019, the UIF investigated bank accounts related to natural persons linked to FUNO. Elías Sacal Micha, founder and member of FUNO’s Technical Committee, told the media that the FGR extorted the shareholders to obtain the 2 billion-pesos check when notified that the UIF maintained more than 300 bank accounts linked to Fibra UNO and its main shareholders, including Max and André El-Mann Arazi, were blocked.

Subsequently, the FGR reported, in the President’s morning conference, the delivery of 2,000 million pesos to the Institute to Return to the People What Was Stolen (INDEP), as part of a reparatory agreement related to the financial investigation mentioned, where Max and André El-Mann Arazi and Fibra UNO’s accounts were involved.

In May 2022, the newspaper El Norte reported that the legal representatives of the involved shareholders requested the FGR to file the investigation file, arguing that the resources delivered through the reparatory agreement had already been allocated to INDEP and that no crime remained to be pursued. The request was presented following a UIF complaint about alleged money-laundering. However, in June of the same year, the FGR publicly declared that there was no final resolution of exoneration and that the investigation for operations with illicit-origin resources remained open. In statements to El Norte, ministerial sources clarified that the institution had not issued any document confirming the closure of the investigation file, contradicting the defense’s statements.

=== Civil lawsuit by Rafael Zaga Tawil (2021) ===
In 2021, businessman Rafael Zaga Tawil filed a civil lawsuit before courts in Mexico City concerning the management of resources of Fibra UNO (FUNO), destined for real-estate investments under the charge of André El Mann Arazi and Moisés El Mann Arazi, main executives of said trust, for the alleged misuse of shared resources in a private trust intended for investments in the United States.

=== Background ===
According to the documents submitted to the Fourth Civil Court of Mexico City, Zaga Tawil asserted that the El Mann brothers invited him to participate in a trust to invest in real-estate projects abroad through institutional FUNO emails, and that after receiving the amount of 1,000 million pesos, they disposed of the funds without his consent, affecting the investor’s equity.

=== Precautionary measures and attachment ===
In December 2021, the court issued precautionary measures and ordered a judicial attachment of up to 1,000 million pesos on the assets, bank accounts and corporate rights of the El Mann brothers, including their shareholding in FUNO. The measure was confirmed by the Índice Corporativo portal, which reported the freezing of accounts and patrimonial rights of the El Mann family after financial movements associated with the trust were detected.

=== Stock-market repercussions ===
The case generated stock-market volatility due to the importance of Fibra UNO in the securities market, as it became publicly known through various media that two high-profile executives in the company were involved in the possible omission of information and fraud. FUNO’s share price fell from 8.81% to 20.61% in 2022. Press reported that the litigation raised questions about the transparency of information to investors. On its side, FUNO issued a statement declaring that the conflict was “of a personal nature and unrelated to the issuer’s corporate operation”.

=== Fibra Next ===
In March 2024, the Attorney General’s Office (FGR) initiated an investigation against Fibra UNO (FUNO) and its project Fibra Next for possible acts of stock-market fraud, in coordination with the CNBV and the UIF. The public announcement on September 8, 2023 about the creation of Fibra Next triggered an approximately 20% rise in FUNO’s shares, generating an estimated stock overvaluation of more than 16,066 million pesos before regulatory approval. However, the announcement was made without the fiscal criterion confirmation from the Tax Administration Service (SAT), which in 2024 requested additional information and had not yet granted formal authorization, delaying the initial public offering (IPO).

The official letter CDMX-EIL-CI-C2-075/2024, issued on March 15, 2024, ordered the CNBV to temporarily suspend authorization of Fibra Next, while the investigation file FED/CDMX/SPE/0001357/2024 was compiled. The complaint holds that corporate communications and market announcements may have misled investors and caused artificial alterations in securities’ prices, in contravention of Articles 383 and 385 of the Securities Market Law. In August 2024, the FGR classified the file as a “relevant matter”, considering it of high financial impact and of public interest.
