= Roberto Hernández Ramírez =

Mexican banker

Roberto Hernández Ramírez (born 24 march 1942 in Tuxpan, Veracruz) is a Mexican businessman. He is a former CEO of Banco Nacional de México (Banamex), Mexico's second largest bank, just after BBVA Bancomer, from Spain. He was a member of the board of Citigroup. Chairman of the Board, Banco Nacional de Mexico, S.A. - 1991 to present and is currently the Honorary Chairman. He cofounded with Alfredo Harp, Acciones y Valores de México, S.A. DE C.V. The brokerage house that later acquired Banamex. He was: Chairman of the Board, Bolsa Mexicana de Valores, S.A. de C.V. (Mexican Stock Exchange) - 1974 to 1979, Director - 1972 to 2003; Member of the International Advisory Committee of the Federal Reserve Bank of New York. Chairman, Asociacion Mexicana de Bancos (Mexican Bankers Association) - 1993 to 1994; Member, Bolsa Mexicana de Valores, S.A. de C.V. - 1967 to 1986; Director of Citigroup from 2001 to 2009; Other Directorships, Grupo Televisa, S.A., (until 2021).

== Biography ==
Hernández Ramirez born 24 march 1942 in Tuxpan, Veracruz received a bachelor's degree in business administration from the Ibero-American University (1964), co-founded with Alfredo Harp Helú Acciones y Valores de México (Accival) Bolsa Mexicana de Valores in 1971, later in 1974 he became the youngest president ever of the Mexican stock exchange. IN 1989 he became the president of FICSAC, an organization created to raise funds to build a new Universidad Iberoamericana. Later in '91 Accival acquired Banamex, and formed the Grupo Financiero Banamex-Accival and was part of the Board of Directors. A year later Roberto founded Fomento Social Banamex of which he became co-president. In 1993 he became president of FUNED ( fundacion Mexicana para la educacion, la tecnologia y la ciencia). Four years later in 1997 Hernandez became the CEO of Banamex. The following year he headed the MUNAL 2000 to create a national art museum, as well as assuming the presidency of the Pro-Universidad Veracruzana patronage. In 2000 he formed the Fomento Ecologico Banamex of which he became co-president. In 2001 a major transaction takes place between the US and Mexico when Banamex-Accival is sold to Citigroup, after this he became a member of the Board of Directors. In '02 he became a member of the International Advisory Committee of the Federal Reserve Bank of New York. During that year he also founded two foundations; Pedro y Elena Hernandez, A.C. and Fundacion Haciendas del Mundo Maya, A.C. The following year he became the Vice Chair of The Nature Conservancy (TNC). In 2005 he was awarded the Sorolla Medal by the Hispanic Society in New York for his contribution and promotion of the arts in Mexico. A year later he assumed the presidency of the patronage of the Hospital Infantil de Mexico "Federico Gomez".

== Member Of ==
Chairman: Banco Nacional de Mexico. Chairman of the Board of Trustees: Nacional Museum of Arts. Honorary Chairman: Museum of the Arts of Veracruz. Board Member: Citigroup Inc., Grupo Financiero Banamex, Grupo Televisa, Ingenieros Civiles Asociados (ICA), Grupo Modelo, Müenchener de México, World Monuments Fund, Grupo Maseca, Universidad de las Americas. Member: Mexican Businessmen Council, Council of the Universidad de Veracruz, Council for Mexico City's Historic Downtown (Patronato del Centro Histórico, A.C.) International Advisory Committee of the Federal Reserve Bank of New York. Former Chairman: Mexican Stock Exchange, Mexican Banking Association, Universidad Iberoamericana. Former Member: Government Board of the Central Bank and Bancomext the Mexican Eximbank, Mexican Investment Board, Entrepreneurial Coordination Council (C.C.E.), Co-chair Latin America Conservation Council (LACC).
