= José Fondevila García =

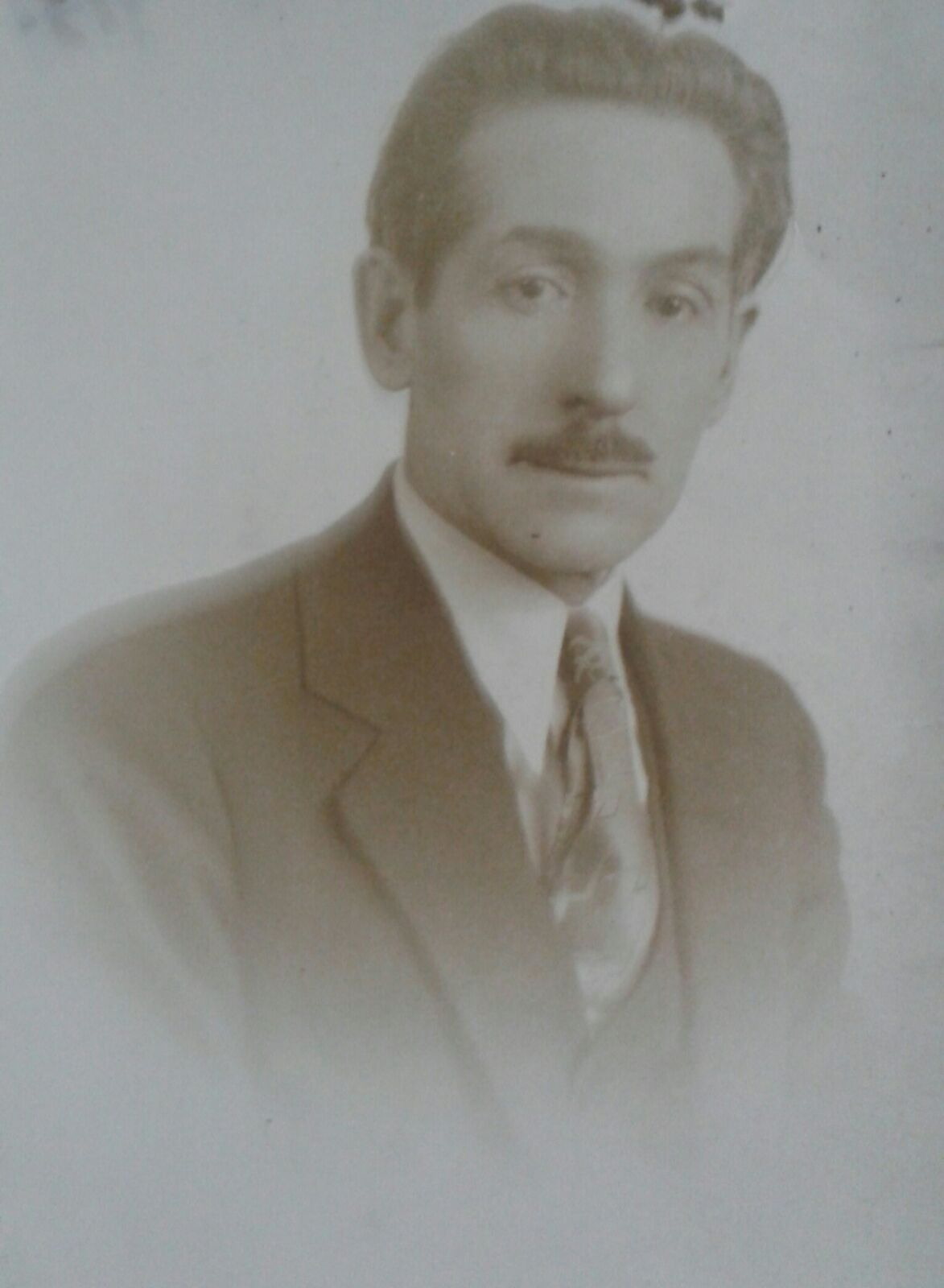
José Fondevila García

José Fondevila García (1884 – 1973) was a Spanish trade unionist.

== Biography ==
He was born in 1884 in the small village of Bermés, Lalín, province of Pontevedra, in the Spanish north-west region of Galicia. At the age of seventeen, he emigrated to Buenos Aires, Argentina where he first began with Union activities. In his trips through some Latin American countries, such as Brazil, Chile, Peru and Mexico, he took part in several struggles related with problems in the working environment. He finished his voyage in New York City, where he established himself as a mechanic.

When the Spanish Second Republic was proclaimed, he went back to Bermés, becoming quickly the leader of the area's working movement, a very well-developed one because of the presence of rail workers on the Ourense-Santiago line. He became a member of the Spanish Socialist Workers' Party (PSOE) in 1936.

A few days after the Spanish coup of July 1936, a group of members of the Spanish far-right movement of Falange tried to arrest him, but Fondevila managed to run away, although he was eventually hurt. He remained in hiding until he managed to cross the border to Portugal, where he boarded to France, and from there, he passed to the Spanish Republican territory.

He took part in the Spanish Civil War as a Commissioner of War, in both the bloody battles of Brunete and Teruel. In 1939, he tried to leave for France, but he was arrested and confined in a concentration camp, from which he ran away and, disguised, returned to Galicia in 1942, relying on a supposed amnesty. But that did not happen, so he decided to go into exile in Mexico. In that country, he tried to be able to make a better living as a mechanic, with some attempts to introduce a "bomb-throw-machine" of his invention to the United States Army.

After being admitted in a hospital for several years, he finally died in Choula, México in 1973.
