= Esteban García =

Argentine footballer

Personal information
- Full name: Esteban Jesús Dani García
- Date of birth: 20 April 1984 (age 42)
- Place of birth: Buenos Aires, Argentina
- Height: 1.67 m (5 ft 6 in)
- Positions: Left midfielder; attacking midfielder

Team information
- Current team: Deportivo Español

Senior career*
Years	Team	Apps	(Gls)
2005–2009	Quilmes AC	49	(2)
2009	Atlético Rafaela	9	(0)
2010–2011	Dinamo Tirana	8	(0)
2011–2012	Estudiantes Río Cuarto		
2012–	Deportivo Español		
- * Club domestic league appearances and goals

Esteban Jesús Daniel García (born 20 April 1984) is an Argentine footballer who currently plays for Deportivo Español.
