= Grupo Financiero Banamex =

Bank in Mexico

Grupo Financiero Banamex, S.A. de C.V
- Trade name: Banamex
- Formerly: Grupo Financiero Banamex-Accival S.A. de C.V. (1991-2001); Grupo Financiero Banamex S.A. de C.V. (2001-2017); Grupo Financiero Citibanamex S.A. de C.V. (2017-2024)
- Type: Subsidiary
- Industry: Financial services
- Founded: 2 June 1884; 142 years ago (brand); 1991; 35 years ago (company)
- Headquarters: Mexico City, Mexico
- Key people: Manuel Medina-Mora Escalante (Chairman of the Board); Ernesto Torres Cantú (CEO)
- Products: Banking, financial
- Revenue: ▲US$ 18.3 billion (2010)
- Net income: ▲US$ 1.7 billion (2010)
- Total assets: ▲US$ 58.4 billion (2011)
- Owner: Citigroup
- Number of employees: 41,390 (2012)
- Website: www.banamex.com

Grupo Financiero Banamex S.A. de C.V. is the holding company of Banco Nacional de México, commonly known as Banamex. It has long been one of Mexico's largest banks. In August 2001, Citigroup acquired Grupo Financiero Banamex-Accival for approximately USD 12.5 billion. Following the acquisition, the bank operated as a Citigroup subsidiary and was rebranded as Citibanamex until 2025. In December 2025, Citigroup completed the sale of roughly 25% of Banamex to a company owned by Fernando Chico Pardo and his family. Citigroup subsequently completed the sale of an additional 22.6% to several other investors in April 2026.

== History ==
Banamex was formed on 2 June 1884 from the merger of two banks, Banco Nacional Mexicano and Banco Mercantil Mexicano, which had operated since the beginning of 1882. The newly founded bank had branches in Mérida, Veracruz, Puebla, Guanajuato and San Luis Potosí, and opened a branch in Guadalajara. After the start of World War I, the French managers of the bank left Mexico. After 10 years, Agustín Legorreta Ramírez who served as acting president managed to revive the bank. Following its reorganization, the bank collaborated with Banco de Mexico and US government officials. By 1937, 36 out of 50 bank branches in Mexico were owned by Banamex.

Banamex gradually introduced several financial product innovations to the Mexican market including the first credit cards in 1968 and an ATM banking system in 1972. In 1977, Grupo Banamex was formed by merging the bank with its investment and mortgage assets. Four years later, Banamex acquired the California Commerce Bank.

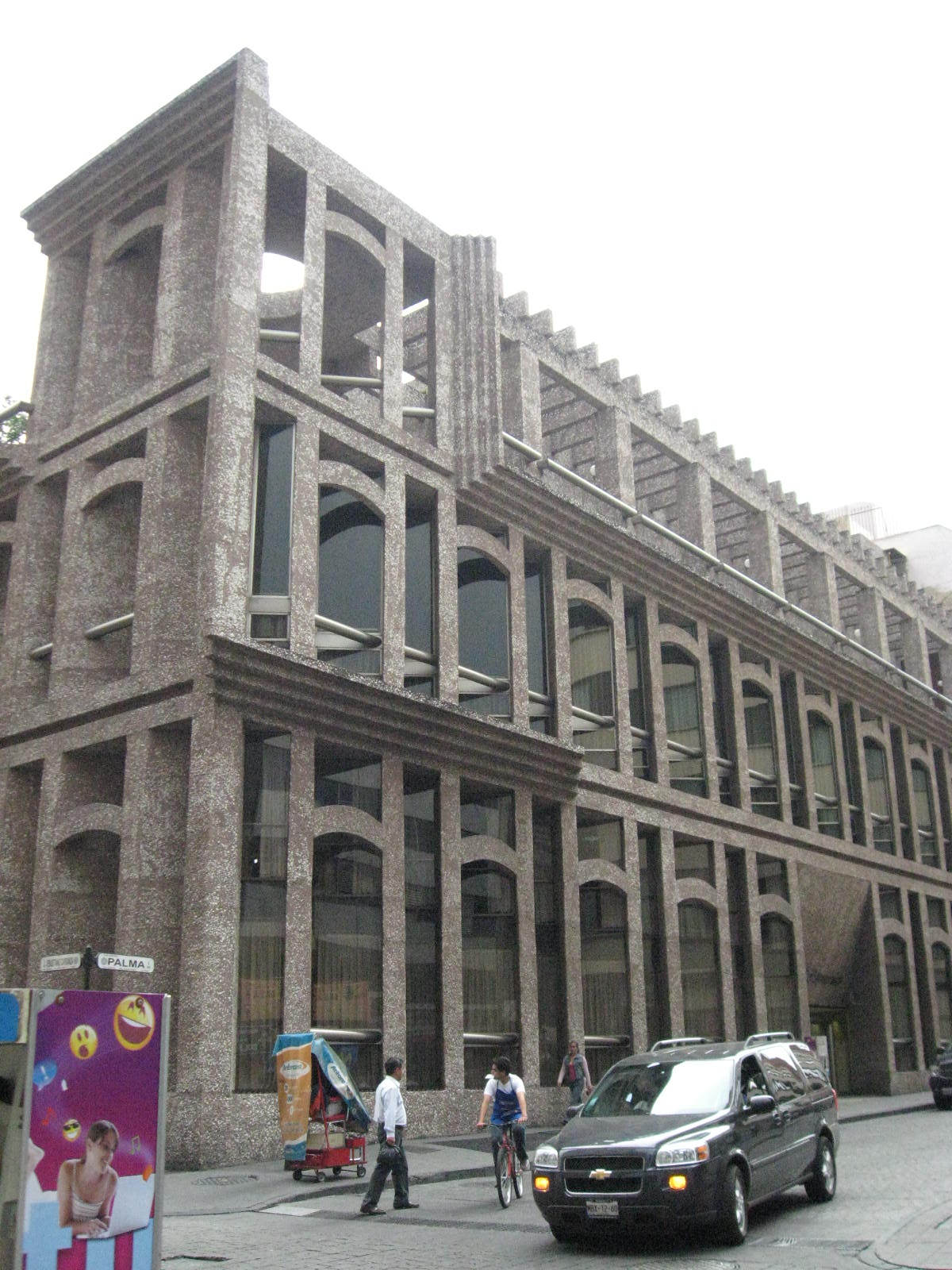
Facade of the Banamex building located on the corner of Carranza and Palma streets in the historic center of Mexico City.

During a severe economic crisis in 1982, then Mexican president José López Portillo announced a major devaluation of the peso and nationalized all private banks in Mexico. For the next nine years, Banamex operated as a government-owned national credit association. In 1991, Banamex was reprivatized and it established Grupo Financiero Banamex–Accival with the investment bank Acciones y Valores de México (Accival). It had 720 branch offices, 31,797 employees, assets of $26.2 billion and a customer base of four million people making it the largest financial group in Latin America at the time.

As a result of the private credit aggressive expansion in Mexico, resulted in a strain of the bank's balance sheet (loan portfolio quality ratios and capitalization ratios). The December 1994 macro-devaluation of the Mexican pesos and the ensuing significant increase in domestic interest rates coupled with a dramatic economic recession, caused Banamex's and much of the rest of the privatized banks to essentially become insolvent.

Banamex former logo used from the 1990s until 2016

In order to avoid the potentially catastrophic effects of generalized bank bankruptcies, the Ernesto Zedillo administration decided to rescue the troubled banks through a government fund (Instituto de Protección al Ahorro Bancario or IPAB, later called Fondo Bancario de Protección al Ahorro or Fobaproa). IPAB enticed the banks' shareholders to inject fresh equity into the banks by pledging to buy from the banks non-performing loans in a two to one (or in some cases greater) ratio with respect to the newly injected fresh capital in exchange for a long-dated government note with capitalized interest. Banamex eventually sold $_ worth of non-performing loans to IPAB, and its shareholders injected $_ of fresh equity. The combination of these measures coupled with a recovery of the Mexican economy helped clean up the bank's balance sheet.

From 1997 to 2001 Roberto Hernández Ramírez was the CEO. In 1997, Afore Banamex was created to access the newly created private pension fund market.

On 6 August 2001, Citigroup Inc. acquired Grupo Financiero Banamex-Accival for US$12.5 billion, which became Grupo Financiero Banamex. This was the largest-ever U.S.-Mexico corporate merger. Grupo Financiero Banamex's operations were integrated with Citibank's relatively small existing Mexico business under the Banamex brand name.

In October 2014, the New York Times reported that employees had taken millions of dollars in kickbacks from vendors and that the bank's security section had purchased recordings of private conversations from third parties, with no apparent business justification. Authorities in Mexico and the United States were investigating the allegations. Citigroup encouraged Manuel Medina-Mora to resign.

Logo used between 2016 and 2025

On 1 December 2024, Citibanamex announced it would continue operations as two separate and individual entities; Grupo Financiero Banamex and Grupo Financiero Citi México.

== Subsidiaries ==
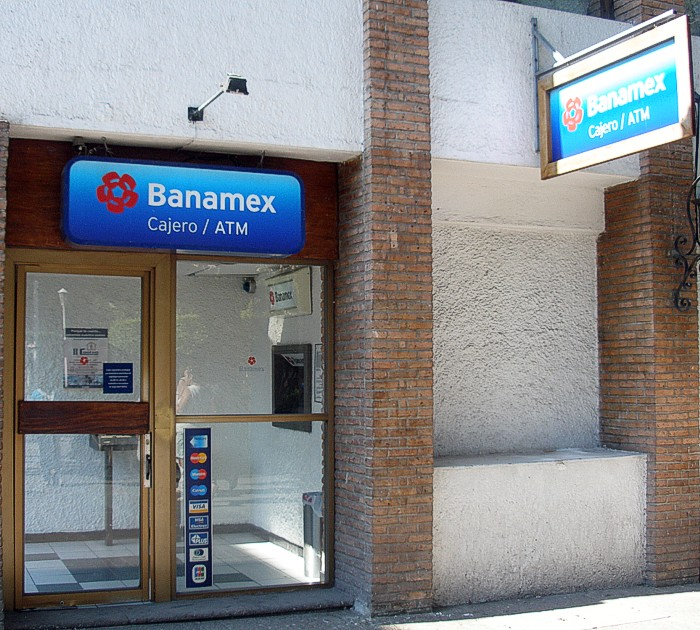
A Banamex ATM in Puerto Vallarta

The following are subsidiaries of Grupo Financiero Banamex:

- Banamex
- Accival
- Afore Banamex
- Seguros Banamex
- Arrendadora Banamex
- Operadora e Impulsora de Negocios
- Acción Banamex
- Pensiones Banamex
- Fomento Cultural
- Fomento Social

=== Banamex USA ===
After Citigroup's purchase of Banamex in 2001, Banamex decided to expand into the U.S. by opening a subsidiary in the country and creating Banamex USA. Most of the bank branches were located in the Southwest with branches in California, Texas, and Arizona. The U.S. subsidiary didn't last long and was shut down in 2015 after a 6-year investigation into Citigroup's and Grupo Financiero Banamex' money laundering scheme by the U.S. Department of Justice. This resulted in Citigroup having to pay a $140 million fine.

== See also ==
- 1884 in Mexico
- Amero
