= Latin Trade =

- Categories: Business
- Frequency: monthly
- Founded: 1993
- Company: Editora Latin Trade
- Country: United States
- Based in: Miami
- Language: English, Spanish and Portuguese
- Website: latintrade.com
- ISSN: 1945-2128

Latin Trade is a monthly magazine covering global business in Latin America and the Caribbean. Similar to Forbes and Fortune Magazine in coverage, the magazine was founded in 1993 and now publishes 40,000 copies every two months in Spanish and English. Some 90% of the magazine's circulation is in Latin America. The magazine has won 27 editorial and design awards since 2002, including awards from the Association of Business Publication Editors (ASBPE).

The LT Group also organized executive roundtables in Miami, São Paulo, Mexico City and Buenos Aires and hosted the LT Bravo Business Awards, one of the most prestigious events in the Americas. The Bravo Awards honor political, business and social leaders for their contributions to progress in Latin America and the Caribbean.

Latin Trade was acquired by Freedom Communications in 1994.

The LT Group was acquired in May 2008 by Manhattan Media LLC, which also publishes Avenue magazine. Manhattan Media formed the subsidiary Miami Media. In 2016, Miami Media sold the LT events business to the Council of the Americas and sold Latin Trade to its management.
