= Bolsa Institucional de Valores =

Stock exchange in Mexico City, Mexico

Institutional Stock Exchange
- Type: Stock Exchange
- Location: Mexico City, Mexico
- Founded: 2017
- Owner: Cencor
- Key people: Santiago Urquiza (Presidente); María Ariza (CEO)
- Currency: MXN
- Market cap: Private company
- Website: www.biva.com

The Institutional Stock Exchange (Spanish: Bolsa Institucional de Valores), commonly known as BIVA, is Mexico's second stock exchange, based in Mexico City. BIVA began operations on 25 July 2018 and trades the same instruments as the other exchange in Mexico, the Bolsa Mexicana de Valores: equities, debts, warrants and some Mexican-specific instruments such as CKDs and FIBRAs.

== History ==
On 29 August 2017, President Enrique Peña Nieto presented Santiago Urquiza Luna Parra, president of BIVA's parent company Cencor, with the concession to open and operate a new stock exchange in Mexico, the Bolsa Institucional de Valores (BIVA). The concession itself was published the same day in the Diario Oficial de la Federación.

The stock exchange commenced operations on 25 July 2018, ending the 43-year monopoly of the BMV in the Mexican stock exchange market. The exchange's first opening bell was rung in a ceremony at the Altar de la Patria in Mexico City.

== See also ==
- Mexican Stock Exchange
- List of stock exchanges in the Americas
- List of Mexican companies
- Economy of Mexico
- Mexican peso
