= Inbursa =

Mexican financial group

Grupo Financiero Inbursa, S.A.B. de C.V.

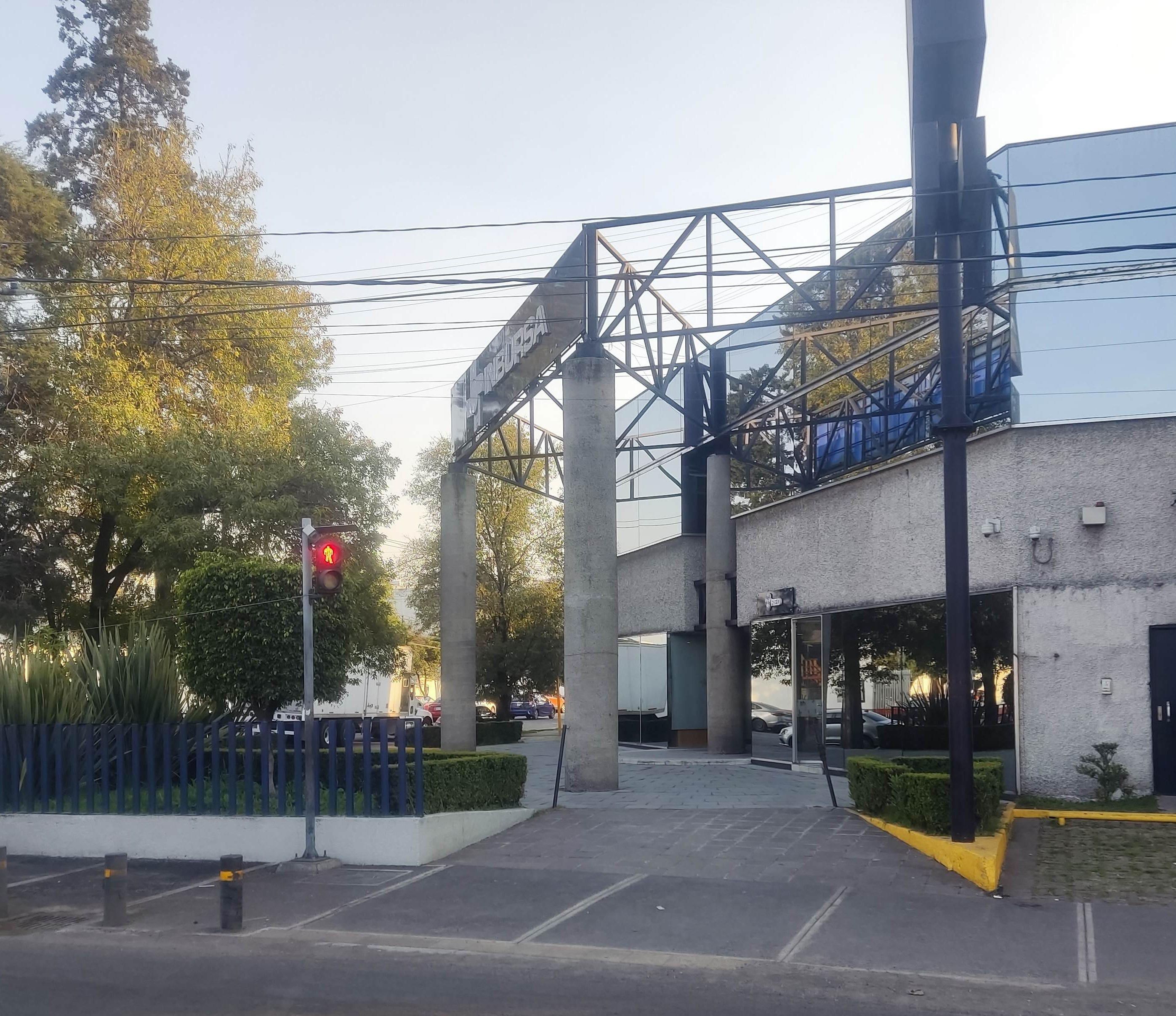
- Company type: Sociedad Anónima Bursátil de Capital Variable
- Traded as: BMV: GFINBUR O
- Industry: Financial
- Founded: 1992; 34 years ago
- Headquarters: Mexico City, Mexico
- Products: Financial services
- Revenue: ▲US$ 1.3 billion (2012)
- Net income: ▲US$ 675.1 million (2012)
- Total assets: ▲US$ 26.1 billion (2012)
- Website: www.inbursa.com.mx

Inbursa is a financial company which, through its subsidiaries, provides banking and related services in Mexico. The company operates business lines in investment funds, general insurance, automobile insurance, mortgages, health insurance, retirement funds and commercial banking. The company is owned by Mexican billionaire Carlos Slim.
