= Mexican Stock Exchange =

Stock exchange in Mexico City, Mexico

Mexican Stock Exchange Bolsa Mexicana de Valores

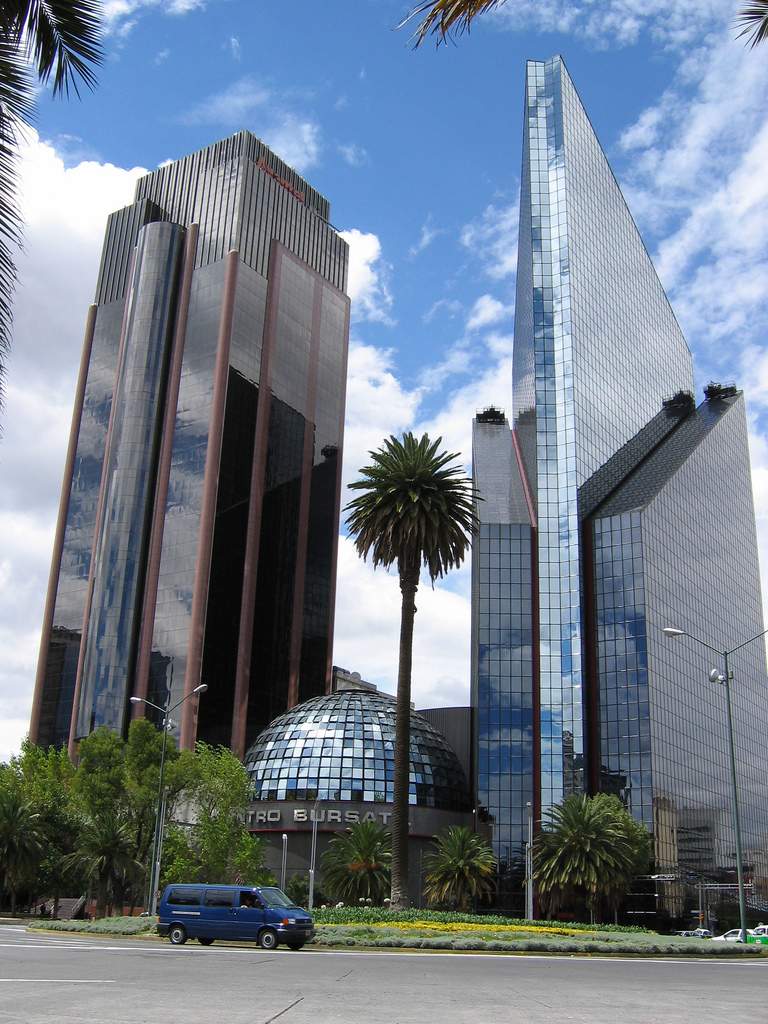
- Front of the Mexican Stock Exchange Buildings in 2008
- Type: Stock exchange
- Location: Mexico City, Mexico
- Coordinates: 19°25′46″N 99°09′52″W
- Founded: 5 September 1933; 93 years ago established by Roberto Hernández Ramírez in 1974, the board of directors of the Bolsa Mexicana de Valores
- Owner: BMV Group
- Currency: Mexican peso
- No. of listings: 140
- Market cap: USD 530 billion (July 2020)BOLSAA
- Volume: USD 134.86 billion (Jan-Dec 2015)BOLSAA
- Indices: IPC; INMEX RT; IRT LargeCap; IRT CompMx
- Website: bmv.com.mx

The Mexican Stock Exchange (Spanish: Bolsa Mexicana de Valores), commonly known as Mexican Bolsa, Mexbol, or BMV, is one of two stock exchanges in Mexico, the other being BIVA - Bolsa Institucional de Valores. It is the second largest stock exchange in Latin America, only after São Paulo based B3 in Brazil. It is also the fifth largest stock exchange in the Americas. The exchange platform is owned by BMV Group, which also owns the derivative exchange MexDer and the custody agency Indeval.

The BMV was created out of the merger of the three stock exchanges which formerly operated in Mexico: The Bolsa de Valores de México, which operated in Mexico City, the Bolsa de Occidente (Occidental Stock Exchange) in Guadalajara, and the Bolsa de Monterrey (Monterrey Stock Exchange). The exchange kept modernising until its introduction of a fully electronic system for trading which was consolidated in 1999.

In 2014, the Mexican Stock Exchange completed its first trade as a part of MILA which, together with the stock exchanges of Santiago, Lima, and Colombia, is the largest securities market by total capitalisation in Latin America.

== History ==
=== Bolsa de México ===
From 1880 to 1900, Plateros and Cadena streets in the historic center of Mexico City were home to recurring meetings in which brokers and businessmen purchased and sold all kinds of commodities as well as stocks in public offerings. Afterwards, exclusive groups of shareholders and issuing company representatives would gather to negotiate behind closed doors in different places around the city.

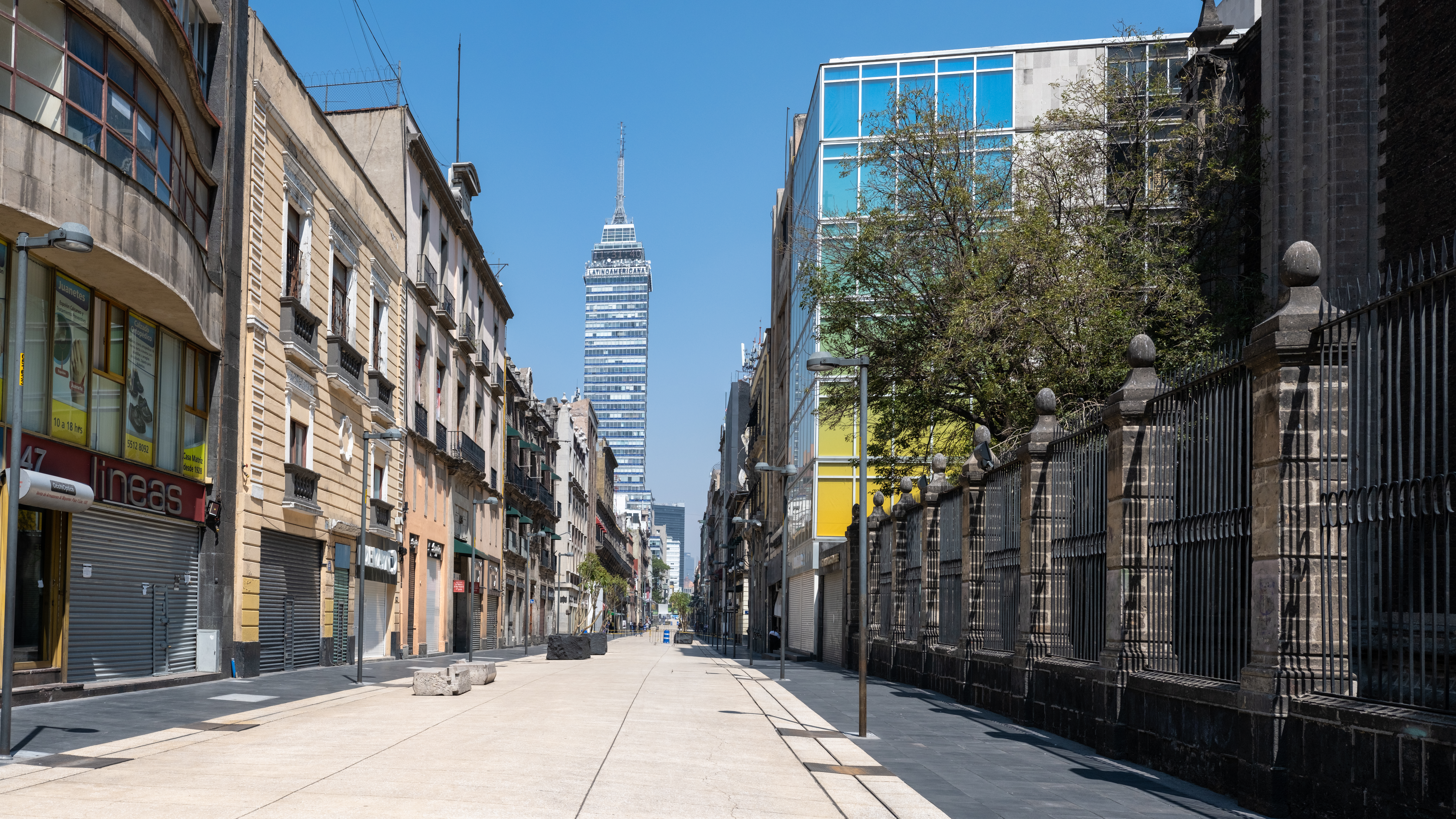
Madero Avenue, home of the first stock exchange in Mexico, is today a pedestrian mall.

In 1894, Manuel Algara, Camilo Arriaga, and Manuel Nicolín pushed, among the most distinguished brokers of the time, the idea of a normative and institutionalised system to trade securities. With the increased backing and widespread support for his ideas, the Bolsa Nacional (National Stock Exchange) was founded on 31 October 1894 at 9 Plateros Street, later renamed Madero Street. Less than a year later, another group of brokers, led by Francisco A. Llerena and Luis G. Necochea, formed a society named Bolsa de México (Stock Exchange of Mexico), and registered as a competing establishment on 14 June 1895. Because of coinciding objectives and links between members of the two institutions, leaders began discussing a union between them. On 3 September 1895, the merger was finalised, keeping the name Bolsa de México, and the administrative offices at the Plateros Street address. The company was officially inaugurated on 21 October 1895.

By the start of the following year, Bolsa de México had three public issuing companies and eight private ones, among them, the Bank of Mexico, the National Bank of Mexico, and the Banco de Londres y México (later acquired by Banco Santander). On 1 March 1933, the Congress of Mexico passed and President Abelardo L. Rodríguez signed into law the Regulatory Decree of the General Law of Credit Institutions and Auxiliary Organisations, normalising the exchange of securities and the stock market in Mexico.

=== Bolsa de Valores de México, S.A. ===
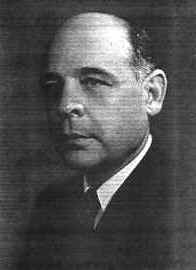
President Abelardo L. Rodríguez

Because of the legal reforms of the time, and the concession authorised by Congress on 28 October 1933, which for the first time included stock exchanges, the charter and bylaws of the Bolsa de Valores de México, S.A. (Stock Exchange of Mexico) were approved, and on 5 September, the institution was incorporated. That same year, the National Securities Commission, later renamed National Banking and Securities Commission, was established to supervise the Bolsa de Valores de México.

Because of substantial industrial and commercial growth in Mexico mid-century, owing to the rise in the creation of maquiladoras in northern Mexico, as well as the accumulation of capital and the constant creation of new businesses at the time, the Monterrey Stock Exchange was established, and it grew to serve the entire North of the country, reaching over 100 listings. Soon after, businesses in Guadalajara started organising a third stock exchange, and in 1960, the Occidental Stock Exchange was established to serve the West coast of Mexico.

=== Mexican Stock Exchange created ===
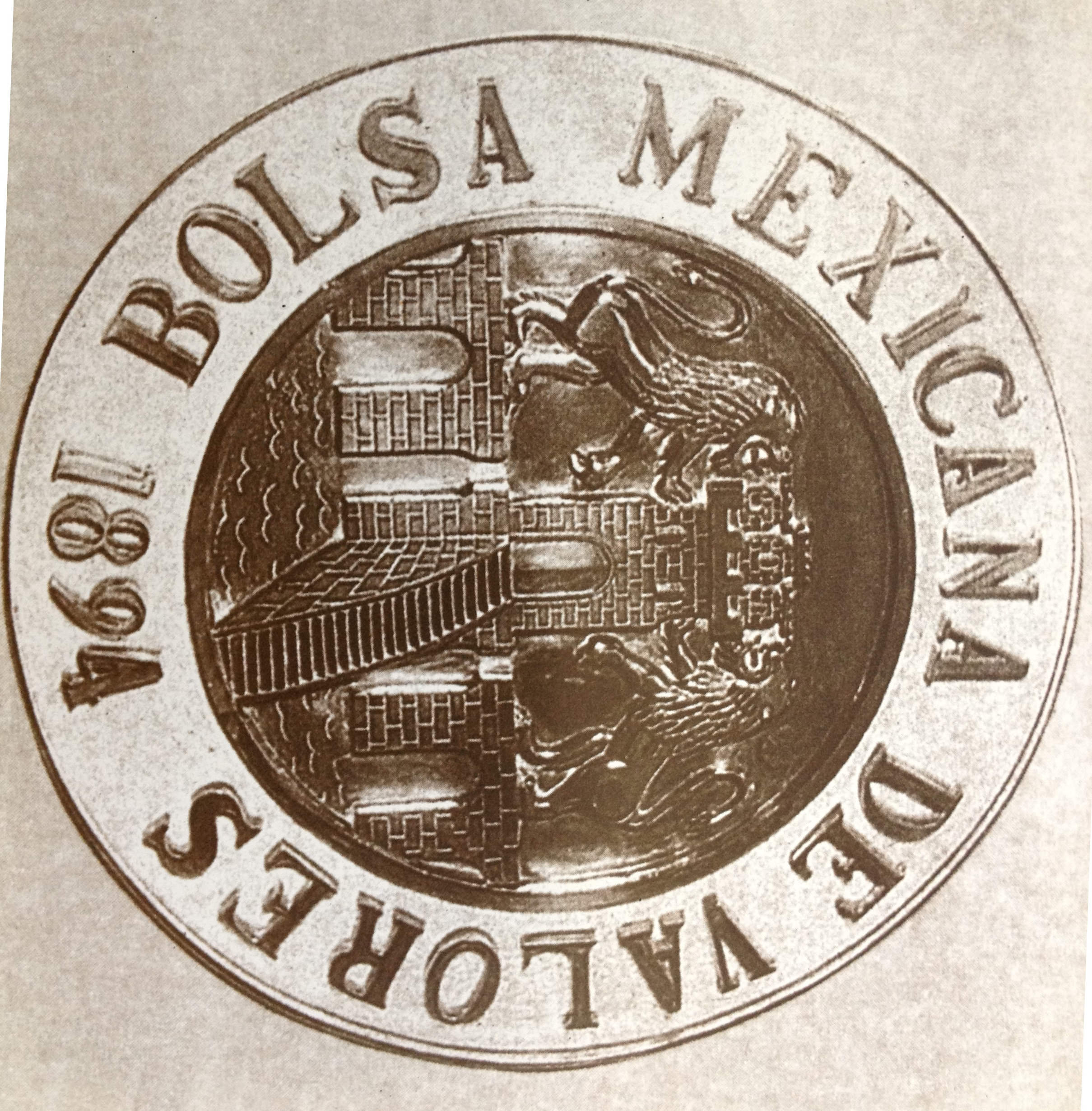
The National Stock Exchange is born.

Because of low performance in the Guadalajara and Monterrey stock exchanges, however, Congress passed in 1975 the Securities' Market Law, which prompted the Bolsa de Valores de México to change its name to Bolsa Mexicana de Valores (Mexican Stock Exchange) and merge the other two exchange houses into it, creating thus the single entity that remains to this day the only stock exchange in Mexico.

On 19 April 1990, the Centro Bursátil was finished on Paseo de la Reforma, turning the Stock Exchange Centre into the heart of the financial district of Mexico City. Five years later, the BMV completely modernised the centre, introducing a completely electronic system (BMV-SENTRA) which was phased into the workings of the exchange, becoming fully operational by 1999.

In 2001, Citigroup became the first foreign company to begin trading in the BMV, opening the door to many new companies to do the same, especially from Central and South America. The same year, the Securities' Market Law was reformed according to the demutualisation of BMV. The following year, the Corporativo Mexicano del Mercado de Valores, S.A. de C.V. was constituted to manage the hiring of personnel, and administration of the Stock Exchange and other financial institutions within the centre.

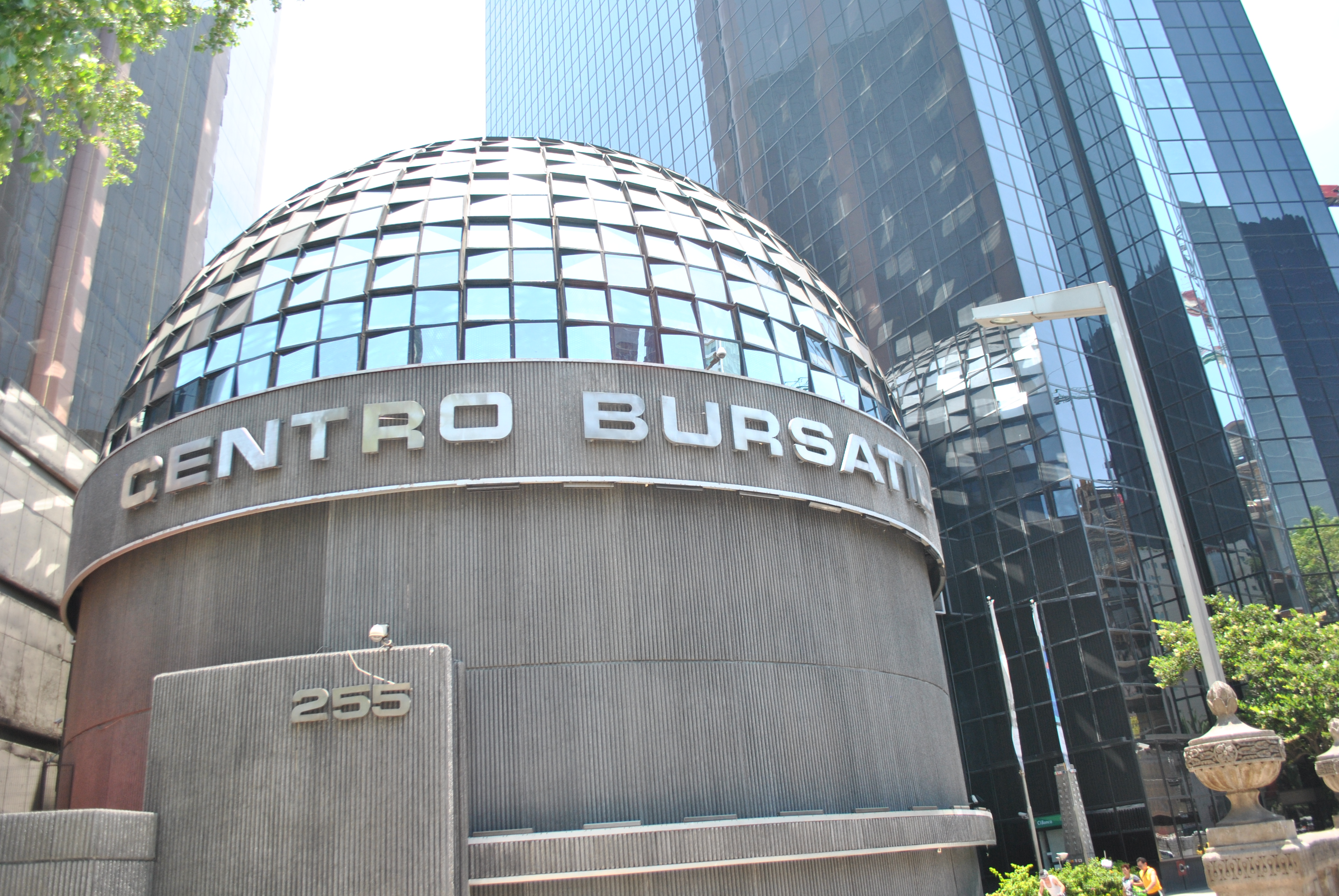
The Stock Exchange Centre in 2012

In 2003, the global market was made available through the BMV, allowing national investors access to foreign securities from within the country. In 2006, the Mexican securities market was opened to foreigners through the MexDer system, allowing them operation from anywhere in the world. In October of the same year, four ETFs (exchange-traded funds) over indexes of the stock exchange itself were listed, placing BMV in the first place in Latin America in terms of ETFs listed over own indexes, and as the leading stock exchange in terms of total ETFs.

In 2010, the BMV signed an alliance with the world's largest derivatives exchange, the Chicago Mercantile Exchange, putting Mexican derivatives within reach of international investors.

The Mexican Stock Exchange, BMV, announced its first trade made as part of the Latin American Integrated Market (MILA by its Spanish initials) on 2 December 2014. The trade on MIILA was a $1,415 purchase of 200 shares in Chilean retailer Falabella, executed by GBM Mexico through GBM Chile. With the entry of Mexico into MILA, the integrated stock market now counts 798 issuers among the four countries, making it the biggest market by number of listed companies in Latin America, and the biggest in terms of market capitalization, according to the World Federation of Exchanges. The joint capitalization of the four bourses tops US$1.25 trillion, making it larger than the US$1.22 trillion BM&F Bovespa. The move comes largely as step in the integration efforts between Mexico, Chile, Colombia, and Peru, as members of the Pacific Alliance.

== Structure and operations ==
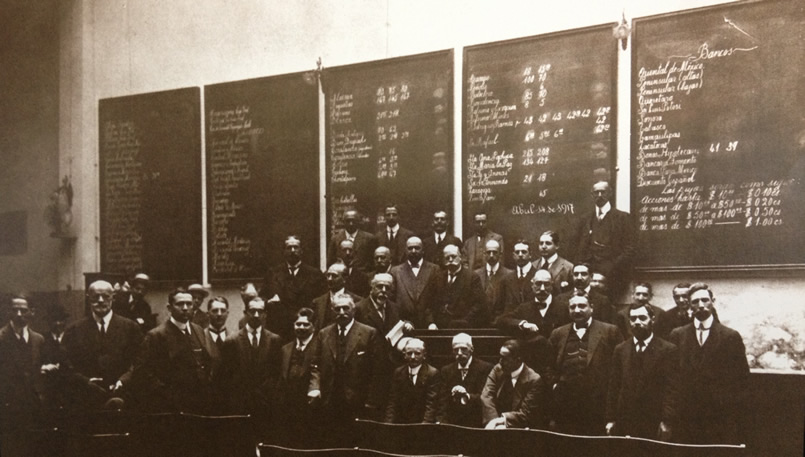
Brokers begin to organize.

BMV is now a public company following its IPO in June 2008, and its shares are traded on the BMV equities market. It operates by concession of the Secretariat of Finance and Public Credit.

Until its IPO, BMV was owned by its members, which were a group of banks and brokerage firms. The exchange trades debt instruments including Federal Treasury certificates (CETES), Federal Government Development bonds (BONDES), Investment Unit bonds (UDIBONOS), Bankers acceptances, promissory notes with yield payable at maturity, commercial paper and development bank bonds. It also trades stocks, debentures, mutual fund shares, and warrants. Trading is conducted electronically through the BMV-SENTRA Equities System. Settlement is T+2, and trading hours are 7:30 a.m. to 2 p.m. for the equities market and 7:30 a.m. to 3 p.m. for the derivatives market (Monday through Friday),

== Indices ==
The BMV calculates 13 indices of stock prices. Each index can be used as an underlying value for derivative products listed on specialized markets. The main benchmark stock index is called the IPC, which stands for Índice de Precios y Cotizaciones, and is the broadest indicator of the BMV's overall performance. It is made up of a balanced weighted selection of shares that are representative of all the shares listed on the exchange from various sectors across the economy, and is revised twice a year. Weight is determined by market capitalization. The IPC's value is related to the previous day's value, rather than the base date of October 30, 1978. Since February 2009 the IPC index has included BMV's own A shares. Indice Mexico (INMEX) is a market capitalization weighted index of 20 to 25 of the BMV's most highly marketable issuers, using their most representative series. The sample is limited to issuers with a minimum market value of $100 million and is revised every six months. The weighting cannot be greater than 10% at the start of each calculation period.

== Listed companies ==
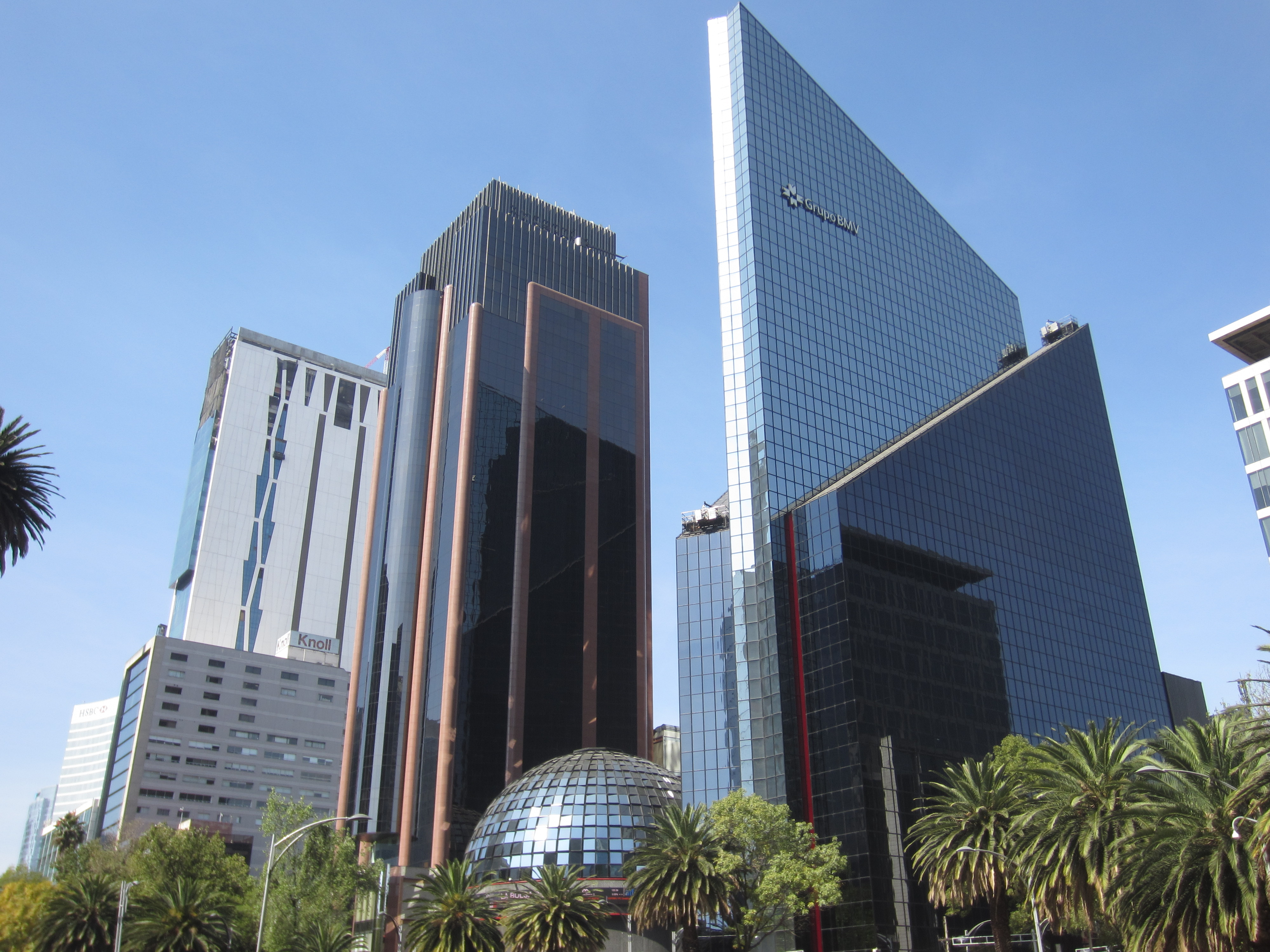
Mexican Stock Exchange

Some major examples:

- América Móvil: Telecom
- Cemex: Cement
- FEMSA: Conglomerate
- Alfa: Conglomerate
- Grupo Aeroportuario del Pacífico: Airports
- Grupo Bimbo: Food
- Grupo Industrial Saltillo: Conglomerate
- Grupo Modelo: Beverage
- Banco Santander (Mexico): Retail and Private Banking
- Siemens AG: Conglomerate
- Azteca: Television, Media
- Televisa: Television, Media
- Telmex: Telecom
- Walmex: Retail

== See also ==
- Bolsa Institucional de Valores
- List of stock exchange mergers in the Americas
- List of stock exchanges in the Americas
- List of Mexican companies
- List of largest Mexican companies
- Economy of Mexico
- Mexican peso
