= List of Mexican brands =

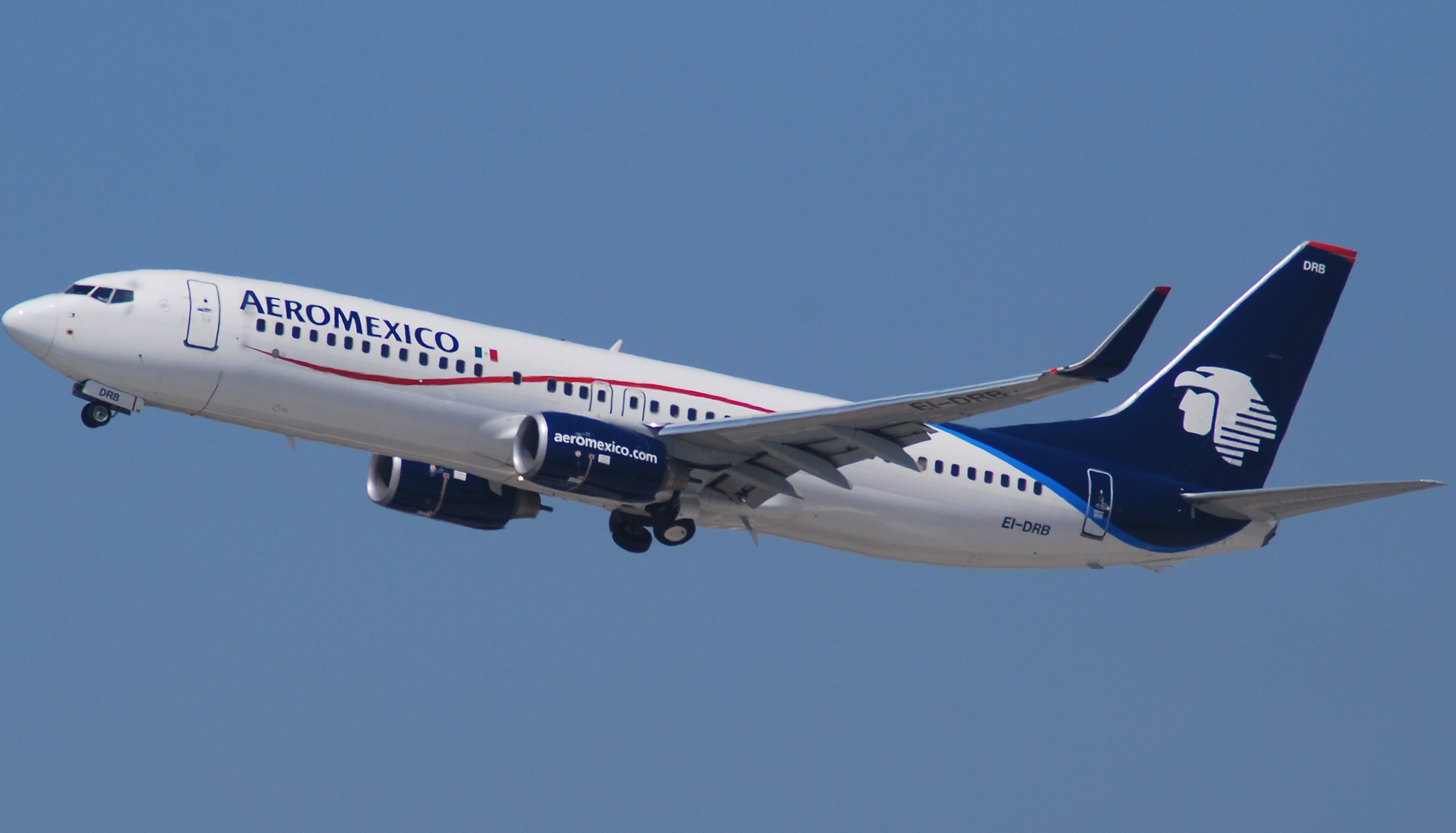
An Aeroméxico Boeing 737-800

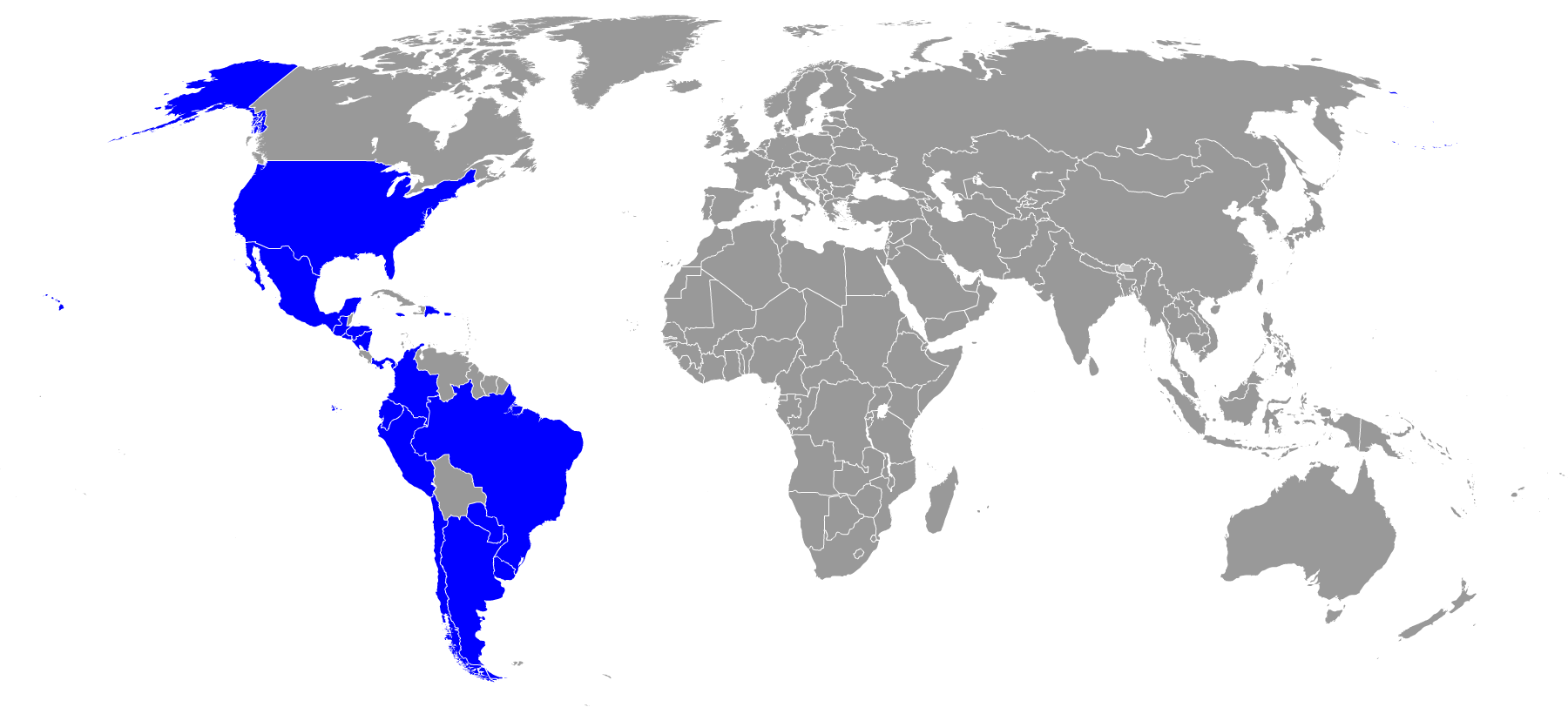
América Móvil's presence in the world

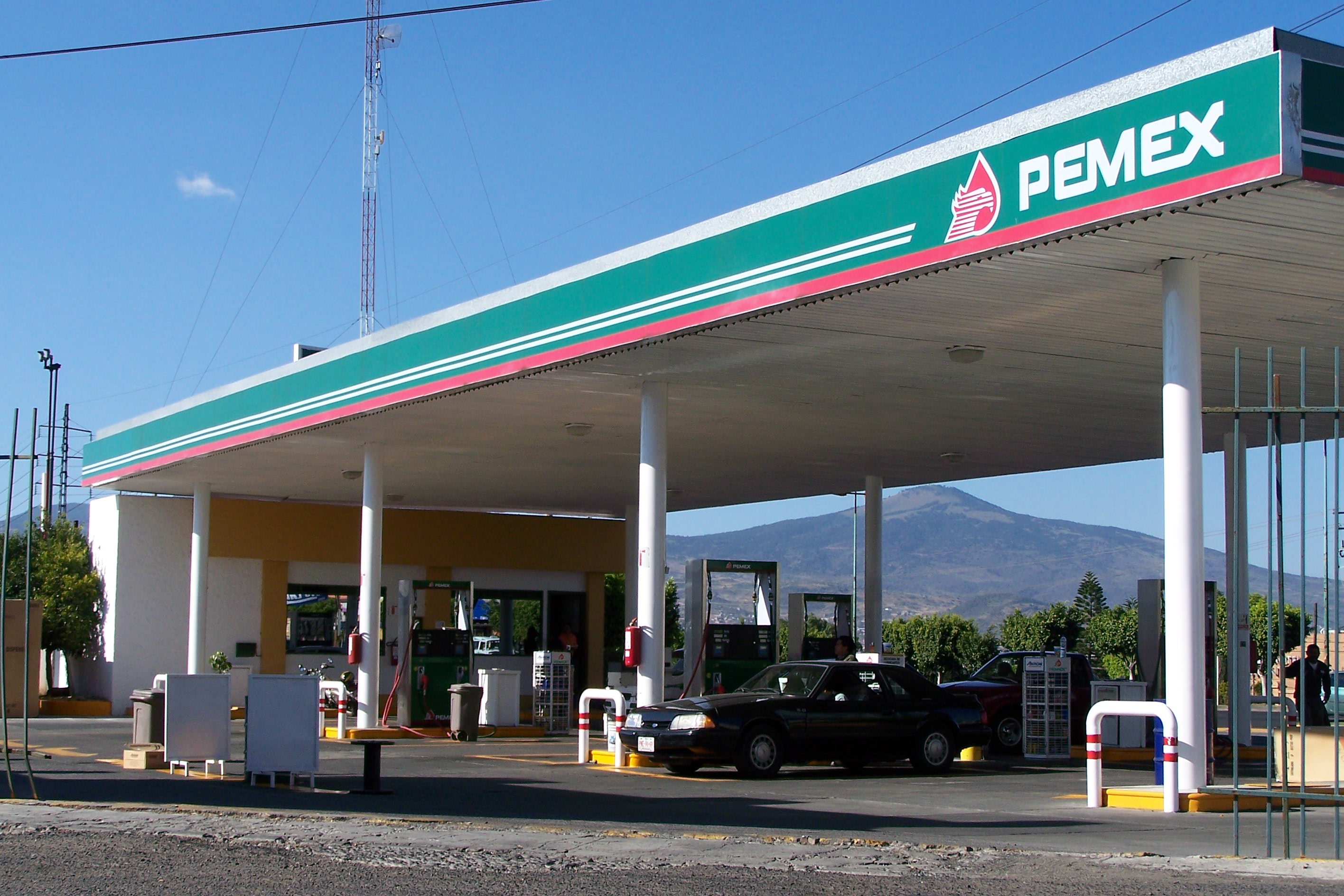
A typical Pemex gas station

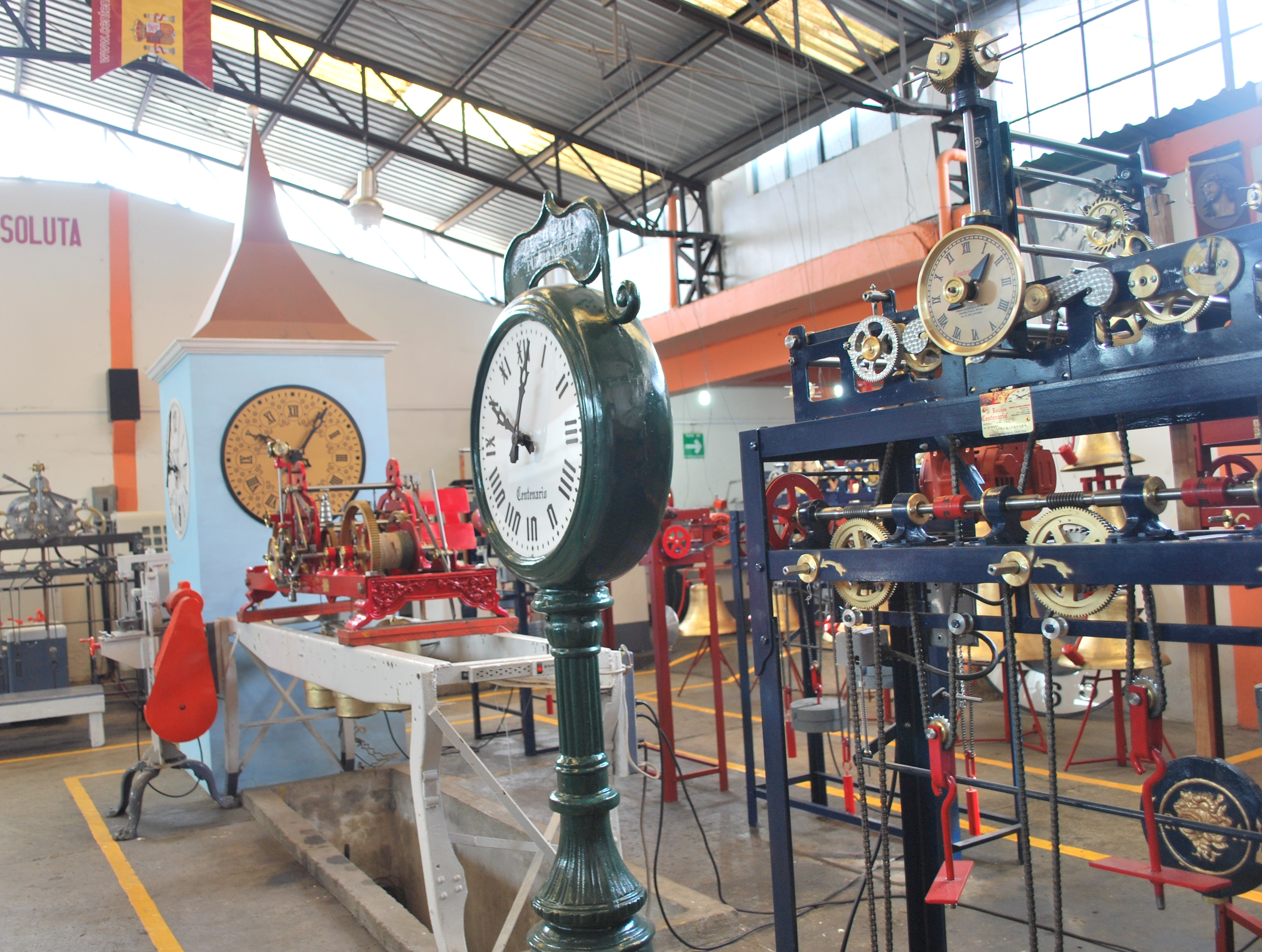
A view of the factory floor at Relojes Centenario, the first manufacturer of monumental clocks in Latin America

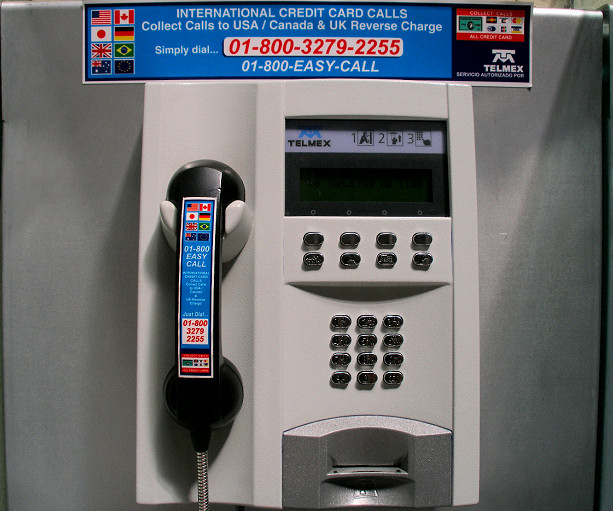
A Telmex pay phone

This is a list of Mexican brands, which encompasses brand-name products and services produced by companies in Mexico.

== Mexican brands ==
- Aeroméxico – flag carrier airline of Mexico based in Mexico City
- Ah Cacao Real Chocolate
- Alpura
- América Móvil
- Atletica
- Banco Azteca
- Banorte
- Barcel
- Canel's – chewing gum and confectionery manufacturer, established in 1925.
- Carso Global Telecom
- Casa Dragones
- Cemento Cruz Azul
- Cemex
- Chilchota Alimentos – manufactures cheese, yogurt, cream, margarine, candies and juices
- Comex Group
- Corona - beer
- DINA S.A.
- Falco Electronics
- Gamesa
- Gruma – largest manufacturer of corn flour and tortillas in the world
- Grupo Bimbo – largest Mexican-owned baking company, with operations in the Americas, Asia, Africa and Europe
- Grupo Famsa
- Grupo Lala
- Interjet – Mexican low-cost airline with its headquarters in Lomas de Chapultepec, Miguel Hidalgo, Mexico City, Mexico
- Italika
- Jumex
- Kahlúa
- Kamora
- Keuka
- Kyoto Electronics – its main business is the design and manufacture of consumer electronics, microelectronic systems and its respective software
- La Costeña - food company
- Lanix – multinational electronics company based in Hermosillo; Mexico's largest domestically owned electronics company
- Mabe
- Mastretta
- Mayordomo
- Meebox
- Mexichem
- Modelo - beer
- Olmeca Tequila
- Pemex – Mexican state-owned petroleum company
- Pirma
- Relojes Centenario
- Sigma Alimentos
- Softtek
- Sol de Mexico Tequila
- Solana - cottage manufacturer of sports, racing, and kids automobiles
- Soriana
- Televisa
- TV Azteca
- Telmex
- Tornel
- Vivaaerobus.com
- Vodka Villa Lobos
- Voit
- Volaris – low-cost airline based in Santa Fe, Álvaro Obregón, Mexico City; its operational base is located at the Tijuana International Airport (TIJ) in Tijuana
Mexican brands

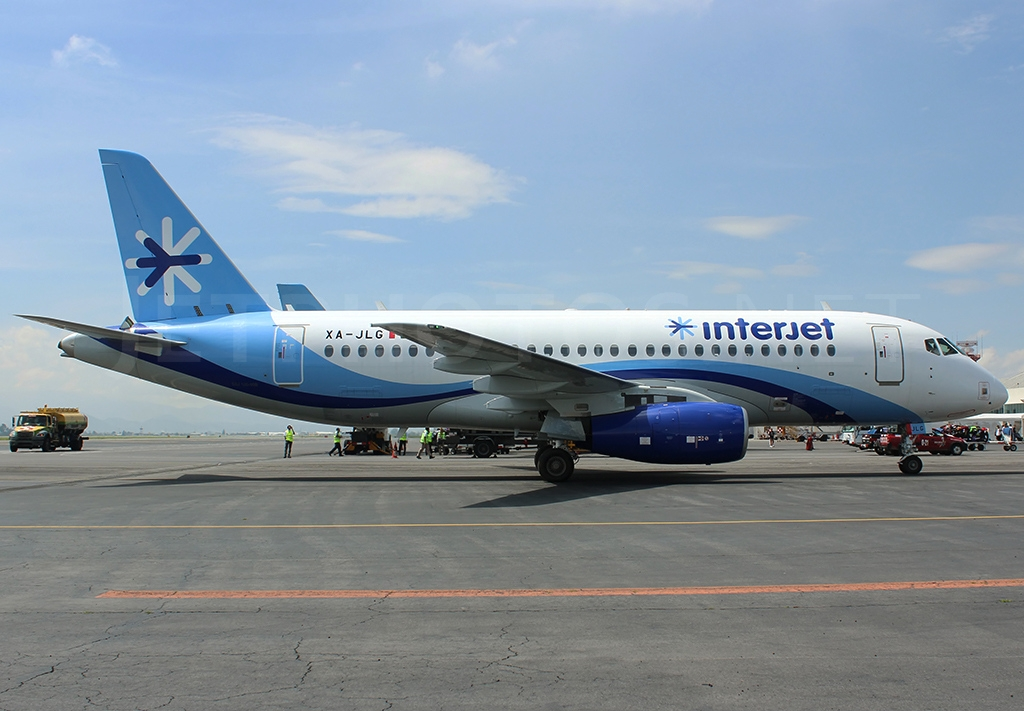
An Interjet Sukhoi Superjet 100 at Toluca International Airport

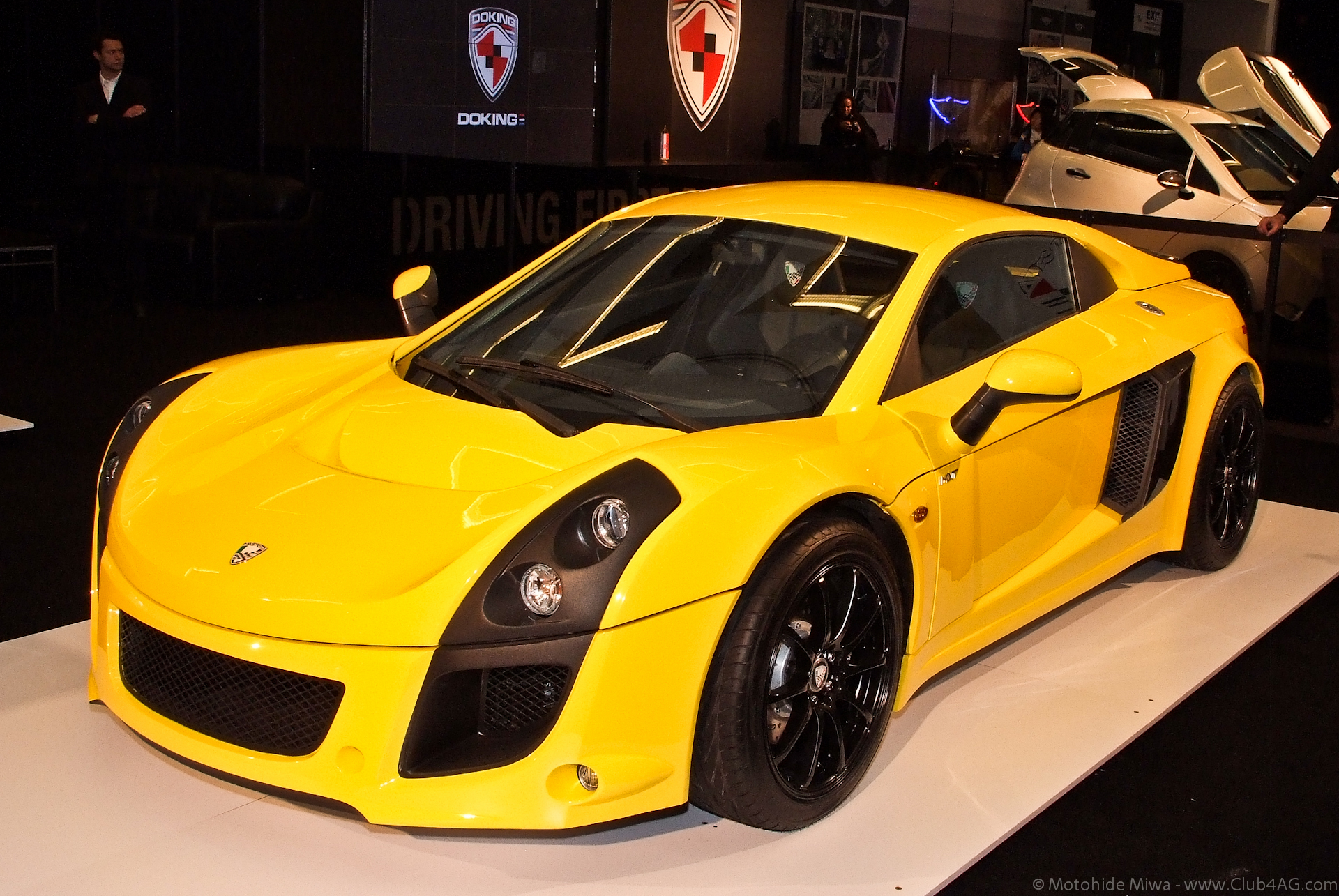
A Mastretta MXT

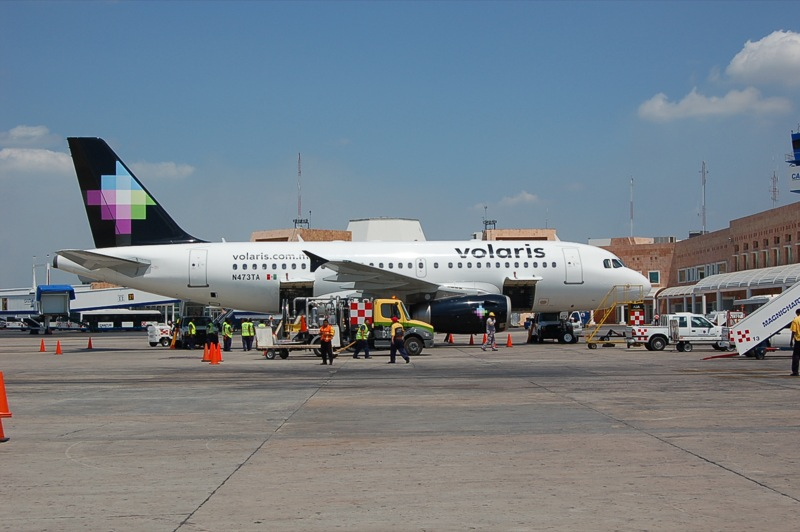
A Volaris Airbus A319 parked at Terminal 2 at Cancún International Airport

== See also ==
- Economy of Mexico
- List of companies of Mexico
- List of hotels in Mexico
- Small and medium enterprises in Mexico
