= Grupo Famsa =

Mexican retail company, 1970–2023

Grupo Famsa S.A.B. de C.V.
- Type: Public
- Traded as: BMV: GFAMSA A
- Industry: Retail
- Founded: 1970; 56 years ago
- Defunct: 31 March 2023; 3 years ago (México only)
- Fate: Bankruptcy And Liquidation
- Headquarters: Monterrey, Mexico
- Key people: Humberto Garza González, (Chairman); Humberto Garza Valdéz, (CEO)
- Products: Financial services
- Revenue: ▲US$ 1.1 Billion (2009)
- Net income: ▼US$ 7.8 Million (2009)
- Number of employees: 18,000
- Website: Archived official website at the Wayback Machine (archive index)(grupofamsa.com); Archived official website at the Wayback Machine (archive index)(famsa.com)

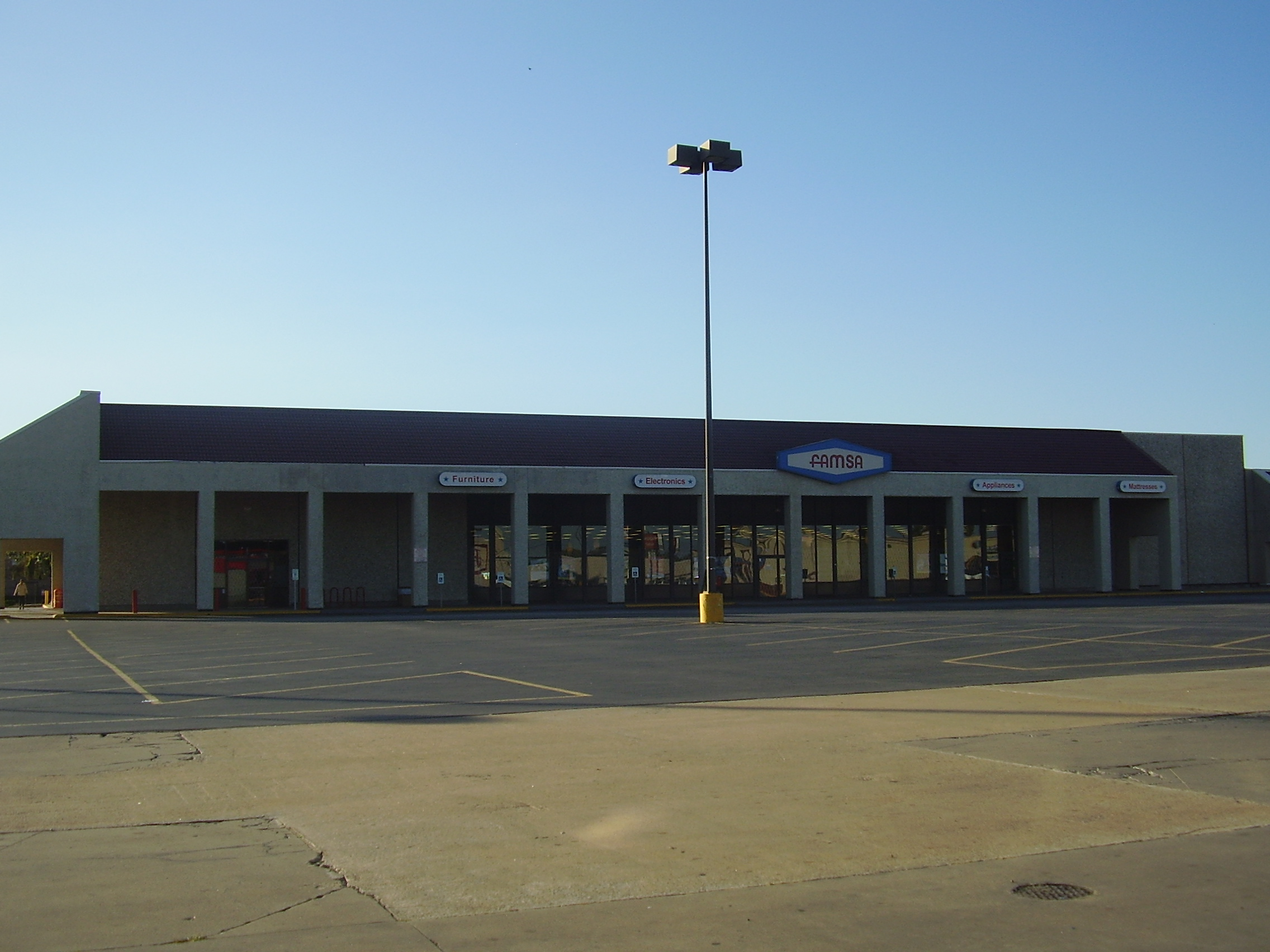
Famsa location #38 Bellaire, in the Gulfton area in Houston

Grupo Famsa is a Mexican retail company that owns Famsa department stores, the company was one of the most important retail stores in Mexico. In 2023, the company has operations in Texas with 21 stores and 21 personal loan branches.

Until 2022 the company had 379 stores in 78 Mexican cities and 22 stores in Texas and Illinois, where 23% of the Hispanic population of the USA resides. The company has its headquarters in Monterrey, Mexico.

It also manufactured furniture and provides banking and credit services, including personal car financing through its Banco Ahorro Famsa. The bank had 359 banking branches within its stores in Mexico until 2020 when the service was liquidated. In Famsa locations in the United States, customers can order deliveries of goods to locations in the United States and Mexico.

In addition, Famsa is in the footwear catalog business. The company serves wholesale and retail customers through retail branches and wholesale warehouses. The company was founded in 1970 in Monterrey.

In 2023, Grupo Famsa closed 69 stores, the 3 remaining Famsa stores remained opened with the last one in Colón avenue closing on March 31, 2023.

In 2023 the chain only remains in Texas with 21 Famsa Furniture stores and 21 personal loan branches by Famsa Loans and Famsa Financial.

== History ==
Don Humberto Garza opened the Fabricantes Muebleros, his first store. The store became Famsa, which spread throughout Mexico beginning in 1975. Famsa opened its first United States location in Los Angeles in late 2000. Famsa intended to target the growing Hispanic American population. In 2005 the company made $1 billion United States dollars in sales; its United States sales made up 11.9 percent of its figure. In 2006 Famsa had 25 U.S. stores; during that year the company planned to open 25 additional United States locations by 2010. In early 2006 Famsa opened operations in Guatemala and planned to begin deliveries to El Salvador.

On 26 June 2020 Grupo Famsa reported in a statement to the Mexican Stock Exchange that it filed a voluntary application under Chapter 11 of the Bankruptcy Code of the United States.

On August 6, 2020, a shareholder meeting authorized a request to file for Chapter 15 Bankruptcy in the United States and bankruptcy in Mexico.

In 2023, Famsa closed their stores in Mexico only 3 stores open.

Finally on March 31, 2023, Famsa closed its final and first location in Monterrey, ending the 53-year-old chain. As of December 16, 2023, Famsa had stores in the US.

== See also ==
- CLABE
