= Small and medium enterprises =

Type of business with small personnel numbers

Small and medium enterprises (SMEs; also known as small and medium businesses or SMBs, or sometimes grouped as small, medium, and micro enterprises or SMMEs) are businesses whose personnel and revenue numbers fall below certain limits. The abbreviation "SME" is used by many national agencies and international organizations, such as the World Bank, the OECD, the European Union, the United Nations, and the World Trade Organization (WTO).

In any given national economy, SMEs outnumber large companies by a wide margin and also employ many more people. On a global scale, SMEs make up 90% of all companies and account for more than 50% of all employment. For example, in the EU, 99% of all businesses are SMEs. Australian SMEs makeup 98% of all Australian businesses, produce one-third of the total gross domestic product (GDP), and employ 4.7 million people. In Chile, in the 2014 commercial year, 98.5% of firms were classified as SMEs. In Tunisia, self-employed workers alone account for about 28% of total non-farm employment, and firms with fewer than 100 employees account for about 62% of total employment. U.S. SMEs generate half of all U.S. jobs, but only 40% of the GDP.

Developing countries tend to have a higher proportion of small and medium-sized enterprises. SMEs are also responsible for driving innovation and competition in many economic sectors. Although they create more new jobs than large firms, SMEs also account for the majority of job destruction and contraction.

According to the World Bank Group's 2021 FINDEX database, there is a $1.7 trillion funding gap for formal, women-owned micro, small, and medium enterprises (MSMEs). Additionally, over 68% of small, women-owned firms lack access to finance.

== Overview ==
SMEs are important for economic and social reasons, given the sector's role in employment. Due to their size, these smaller firms are heavily influenced by their chief executive officers (CEOs) or managing directors. The CEOs of SMEs are often the founders, owners, and managers of the business. The duties of a CEO in both SMEs and large companies are similar: the CEO needs to strategically allocate their time, energy, and assets to direct the organization. Typically, the CEO is the strategist, champion, and leader for developing the business, or the prime reason for the business failing.

The European Union sees SMEs as playing a crucial role in powering economic growth, innovation, and the transition to more knowledge-based economic structures. At the employee level, Petrakis and Kostis (2012) explore the role of interpersonal trust and knowledge in the number of small and medium enterprises. They conclude that knowledge positively affects the number of SMEs, which in turn positively affects interpersonal trust. The empirical results indicate that interpersonal trust does not affect the number of SMEs. Therefore, although knowledge development can reinforce these companies, trust becomes widespread in a society when the number of SMEs is greater.

Medium- or mid-sized enterprises that have grown beyond the scale of a small business may have different support needs. Their contribution to the local and national economies where they operate may also be quite distinct from the contribution of a smaller business.

== By country ==
Multilateral organizations have been criticized for using a single measure for all contexts. The legal definitions of SMEs vary by country.

=== Africa ===
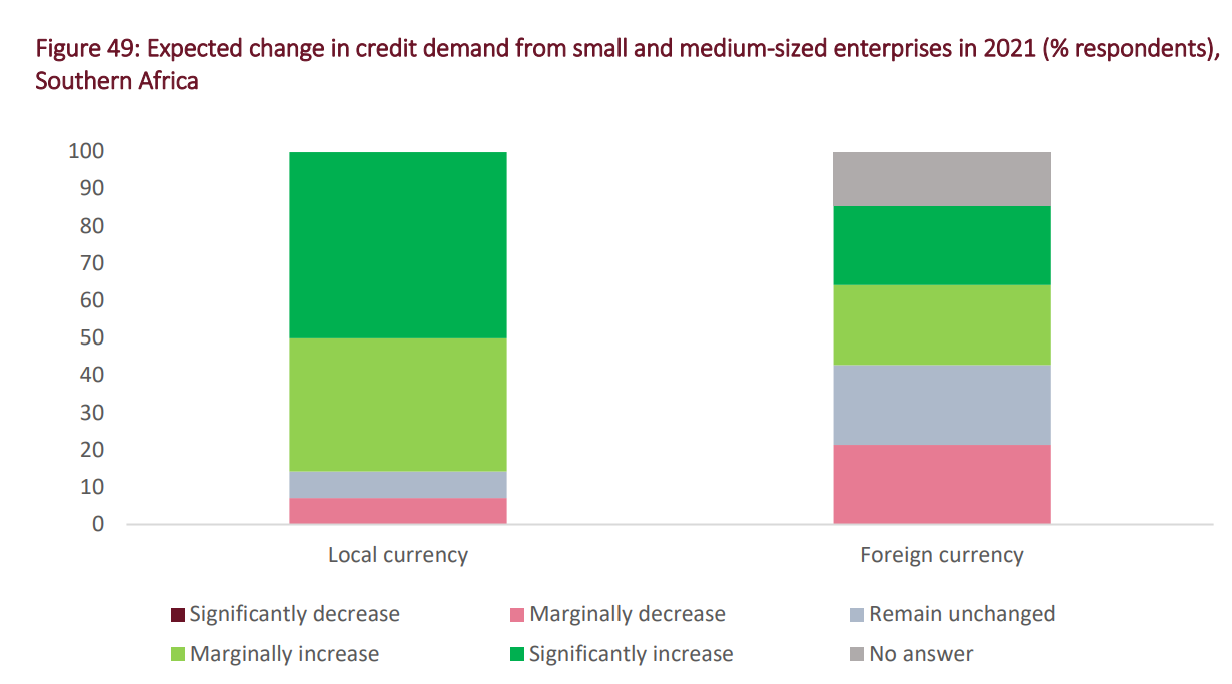
Results from the European Investment Bank's Banking in Africa survey, 2021. Expected change in credit demand from small and medium-sized enterprises in 2021 in Southern Africa.

African small businesses frequently struggle to secure the capital they require to thrive. According to the SME Finance Forum, the formal financing gap for African SMEs averaged 17% of GDP across the 43 countries assessed in 2017.

According to the World Bank, women own 58% of all MSMEs in Africa.

The European Investment Bank's 2021 Banking in Africa survey suggests that most responding banks had a non-performing loan (NPL) ratio of 5% or higher. NPLs account for at least 10% of the SME portfolio in approximately one-third of African banks. Furthermore, half of the banks had more than 5% of their SME portfolio under a moratorium, and 40% had a similar proportion of SME loans under some type of restructuring.

==== Egypt ====
Most of Egypt's businesses are small-sized, with 97% employing fewer than 10 workers, according to census data released by the state-run Central Agency for Public Mobilization and Statistics (CAPMAS). Medium-sized enterprises with 10 to 50 employees account for around 2.7% of total businesses. Large businesses with over 50 employees account for 0.4% of all enterprises nationwide. The data is part of Egypt's 2012/13 economic census on establishments ranging from small stalls to large enterprises. Economic activity outside these establishments—like street vendors and farmers—was excluded from the census. The results show that Egypt is lacking in medium-sized businesses. Seventy percent of the country's 2.4 million businesses have only one or two employees, while less than 0.1%—only 784 businesses—employ between 45 and 49 people.

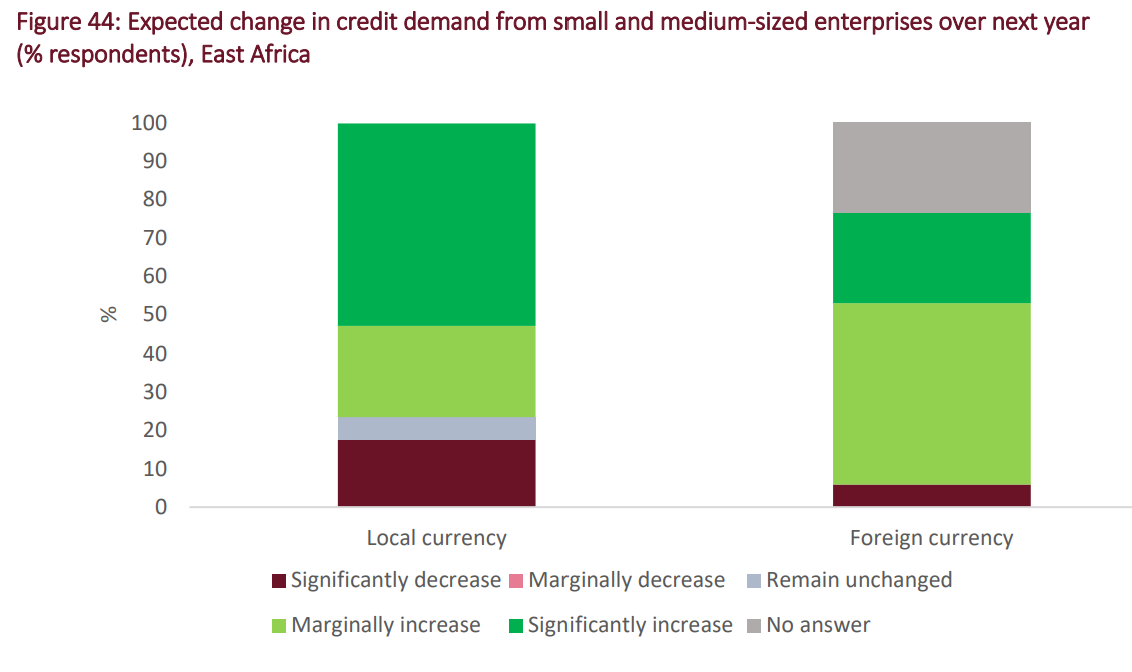
Results from the European Investment Bank's Banking in Africa survey, 2021, for the expected change in credit demand from SMEs in East Africa

If we look specifically at formally registered enterprises, SMEs constitute over 90% of all firms in Egypt's private sector and contribute approximately 43% of the country's GDP. Owing to their smaller scale, limited financial resources, and more restricted access to development support programmes, these enterprises are more vulnerable to external economic shocks compared to both larger firms and the informal sector. The same pattern is true not only for Egypt but for most African economies.

==== Kenya ====
In Kenya, businesses are classified as micro, small, and medium-sized enterprises (MSMEs) under the Micro and Small Enterprises Act of 2012. By definition, micro-enterprises can have up to 9 employees, small enterprises 10 to 49, and medium enterprises 50 to 99.

==== Nigeria ====
The Central Bank of Nigeria defines SMEs as entities having an asset base between ₦5 million ($15,400) and ₦500 million ($1,538,000), with an employee count ranging from 11 to 100.

==== Somalia ====
In Somalia, an SME is defined as a small business that has more than 30 employees but less than 250 employees.

==== South Africa ====
In the National Small Business Amendment Act 2004, micro-businesses in the different sectors, varying from the manufacturing to the retail sectors, are defined as businesses with five or fewer employees and a turnover of up to R100,000 ZAR ($6,900). Very small businesses employ between 6 and 20 employees, while small businesses employ between 21 and 50 employees. The upper limit for turnover in a small business varies from R1 million ($69,200) in the agricultural sector to R13 million ($899,800) in the catering, accommodations and other trade sectors as well as in the manufacturing sector, with a maximum of R32 million ($2,214,800) in the wholesale trade sector.

Medium-sized businesses usually employ up to 200 people (100 in the agricultural sector), and the maximum turnover varies from R5 million ($346,100) in the agricultural sector to R51 ($3,529,800) million in the manufacturing sector and R64 ($4,429,600) million in the wholesale trade, commercial agents and allied services sector.

A comprehensive definition of an SME in South Africa is, therefore, an enterprise with one or more of the following characteristics:

- Fewer than 200 employees,
- Annual turnover of less than R64 million,
- Capital assets of less than R10 million,
- Direct managerial involvement by owners

==== Tunisia ====
In Tunisia, self-employed workers alone account for about 28% of the total non-farm employment, and firms with fewer than 100 employees account for about 62% of total employment.

=== Asia ===
SMEs account for nearly 90% of all company entities in developing Asian countries and are the principal private sector employers, supplying 50-80% of all jobs.

SMEs account for 97-99% of all firms in South-east Asia, contributing considerably to each country's GDP—for example, 46% in Singapore, 57% in Indonesia, and over 40% in other nations.

China

Small and medium-sized enterprises (SMEs) are an integral part of China's economy. According to China's Ministry of Industry and Information Technology, China has more than 48 million SMEs by the end of 2021 which represents around 99% of all enterprises in the country. Although SMEs are an important contributor to employment and innovation they have faced barriers when it comes to obtaining credit from larger banks. Digital commerce has played and important role where some SMEs have obtained additional channels to reach customers and suppliers. A Cambridge University Press case study on Alibaba and Ant Group described how Alibaba's platforms connected smaller Chinese businesses with domestic and international buyers.

==== Bangladesh ====
In Bangladesh, Bangladesh Bank defines small and medium enterprises based on fixed assets, employed manpower and yearly turn over, and they are definitely not Public Limited Co. and requires these characteristics:

Key: SE = Small enterprises; ME = Medium enterprises; N/A = Not Applicable; Tk lakhs= × 100,000 Bangladeshi takas

Serial No	Sector	Fixed assets other than land and buildings (Tk lakhs)		Employed manpower		Yearly Turnover (Tk lakhs)	
Serial No	Sector	SE	ME	SE	ME	SE	ME
01	Services	10 – 200	200 – 3000	16–50	51–120	N/A	
02	Business	10 – 200		16–50		100–1200	
03	Industrial	75 – 1500	1500 – 5000	31–120	121–300	N/A	

==== Hong Kong ====
Hong Kong defines Small and Medium Enterprises (SMEs) as any manufacturing business that employs less than 100 people or any non-manufacturing business that employs less than 50 people.

98% of business establishments in Hong Kong are defined as SMEs and employed 45% of the work force.

==== India ====
India defines Micro, Small and Medium Enterprises based on dual criteria of investment and turnover. This definition is provided in Section 7 of Micro, Small & Medium Enterprises Development Act, 2006 (MSMED Act) and was notified in September 2006. The Act provides for the classification of enterprises based on their investment size and the nature of the activity undertaken by that enterprise. As per MSMED Act, enterprises are classified into two categories - manufacturing enterprises and service enterprises. For each of these categories, a definition is given to explain what constitutes a micro-enterprise or a small enterprise or a medium enterprise. If an enterprise does not fall under the above categories, it would be considered a large-scale enterprise.

April 1, 2025, India updated the definition as follows:

Sr No	Classification	Criteria (in ₹)
1	Micro Enterprises	Investment <= 2.5 CR and Turnover <= 10 CR
2	Small Enterprises	Investment <= 25 CR and Turnover <= 100 CR
3	Medium Enterprises	Investment <= 125 CR and Turnover <= 500 CR

Businesses that are declared as MSMEs and within specific sectors and criteria can then apply for "priority sector" lending for help with business expenses; banks have annual targets set by the Prime Minister's Task Force on MSMEs for year-on-year increases of lending to various categories of MSMEs. MSME is considered a key contributor to India's growth and contributes 48% to India's total export.

In India, businesses need to apply for Udyam Registration with the government to avail the benefits of MSME.

==== Indonesia ====
In Indonesia, the government defines micro, small, and medium enterprises (Indonesian: usaha mikro kecil menengah, UMKM) based on their assets and revenues according to Law No. 20/2008:

Type	Maximum assets Rp millions	Gross Revenue Rp millions	Number of Employees Statistics Indonesia
Micro	<50	<300	1-4
Small	50-500	300-2,500	5-9
Medium	500-10,000	2,500-50,000	20-99
Large	>10,000	>50,000	>99

An annual revenue of Rp 50 billion is approximately equal to US$3.1 million as of April 2024.

Despite their significant contribution to GDP and job creation, Indonesian MSMEs confront a number of obstacles. One of the most significant is capital access: 60-70% of MSMEs lack access to financial institutions and their funding options. Other restrictions include inadequate infrastructure, difficulties acquiring company licences and permissions, high tax rates, political insecurity, and improving their brand image in the digital era.

21st-century businesses strategically use both their websites and social media in order to advertise their products and control their branding. Quality content on both information streams will positively affect branding and attract customers.

The People's Business Credit (Kredit Usaha Rakyat, or KUR [id]) was established in 2007 by President Yudhoyono to extend credit to businesses that were considered "feasible but not bankable". Bank Rakyat Indonesia conducts more than half of KUR lending nationwide. In Jakarta, the capital city of Indonesia, 529 MSMEs with the potential to be funded have been identified by Bank Indonesia.

Economy Sector	Number of Companies
Processing Industry	151
Health Services and Social Activities	1
Rental leasing services without option rights, employment, travel agents and other business support	9
Professional, Scientific And Technical Services	11
Other Service Activities	21
Arts, Entertainment And Recreation	1
Construction	2
Water Procurement, Waste Management And Recycling, Waste And Garbage Disposal And Cleaning	1
Provision of Accommodation and Provision of Food and Drink	80
Wholesale and retail trade of car and motorcycle repair and maintenance	236
Agriculture, Forestry, and Fisheries	16

==== Philippines ====
According to the Department of Trade and Industry's 2020 List of Establishments report, there are 957,620 registered business enterprises operating in the country, composed of 99.51% MSMEs and 0.49% large firms. The MSMEs consist of 88.77% microenterprises, 10.25% small enterprises, and 0.49% medium enterprises. Among the top industry sectors include (1) wholesale and retail trade; repair of motor vehicles and motorcycles (445,386); (2) accommodation and food service activities (134,046); (3) manufacturing (110,916); (4) other service activities (62,376); and (5) financial and insurance activities (45,558) which accounted for about 83.77% of the total number of MSME establishments. Prior to the pandemic, MSMEs generated more than 5.38 million jobs or 62.66% of the country's total employment with a 29.38% share from micro-enterprises followed by 25.78% and 7.50% for small and medium enterprises.

==== Singapore ====
With effect from 1 April 2011, the definition of SMEs is businesses with annual sales turnover of not more than $100 million or employing no more than 200 staff.

=== Europe ===
==== European Union ====
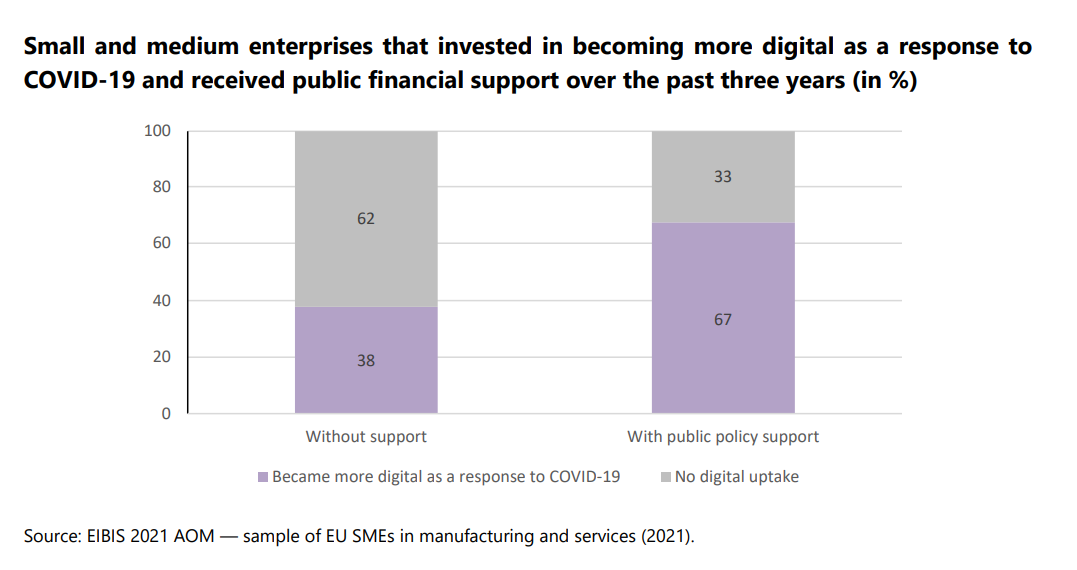
Small and medium enterprises that invested in becoming more digital as a response to COVID-19 and received public financial support over the past three years

Small companies are important to the European economy as they account for 99.8% of non-financial enterprises in the European Union (EU) and European Economic Area (EEA), and employ two-thirds of the workforce in the EU. The majority of European firms are small and medium-sized enterprises (SMEs), employing over 100 million people. (Note: The European Commission estimated that there were 20 million micro, small and medium-sized enterprises in the EEA in 2003.) Due to the COVID-19 pandemic, a large majority of SMEs saw a decline in revenue during 2020-2021.

Medium-sized businesses (or mid-caps) play an important role in the European economy, accounting for a considerable part of employment and wealth production. According to a recent European Commission analysis, mid-cap companies (250-3000 people) make up about 17% of total employment and 21% of turnover in the EU27 business sector.

Micro firms (with fewer than nine employees) employ 38% of the total workforce, while SMEs with fewer than 250 employees account for 34.4%. Larger (XL) firms with 3,000 or more employees account for 10.1% of overall employment in EU business sectors. According to Eurostat SBS statistics, in 2021, tiny enterprises (0-9 workers) and SMEs (excluding micro firms) employed around 30% and 34.5% of the entire workforce in EU27 business sectors, while bigger firms (250+ employees) contributed for 36.4% of overall employment.

The pandemic has had a greater impact on SMEs than on large businesses, with an average sales loss of 26% versus 23% for large businesses. Government assistance appears to have benefited SMEs more than large corporations among the companies that do have overdraft facilities, indicating a successful application of policies to ease financial limitations for SMEs even when they receive help from the banking sector. The EIB Group contributed more than €16.35 billion to small and medium-sized firms in 2022.

SMEs were more responsive in altering output during the pandemic, despite the intensity of the shock. In reaction to the crisis, one-third of major enterprises altered their output or services, compared to 37% of SMEs.

Large businesses, on the other hand, embraced digitization to a greater extent than small businesses, with 26% boosting their online distribution of products and services, compared to 22% for SMEs. The most significant difference in adaption measures was shown in the chance of expanding remote work, which increased by 25% among SMEs but 50% among large businesses.

The criteria for defining the size of a business differ from country to country, with many countries having programs of business rate reduction and financial subsidy for SMEs. According to the European Commission, SMEs are enterprises which meet the following definition of staff headcount and either the turnover or balance sheet total definitions:

Company category	Staff headcount	Turnover	Balance sheet total
Medium-sized	< 250	≤ €50 million	≤ €43 million
Small	< 50	≤ €10 million	≤ €10 million
Micro	< 10	≤ €2 million	≤ €2 million

In July 2011, the European Commission said it would open a consultation on the definition of SMEs in 2012. A consultation document was issued on 6 February 2018 and the consultation period closed on 6 May 2018. As of November 2019, no conclusions or responses have yet emerged.

In Europe, there are three broad parameters that define SMEs:

- Micro-enterprises have up to 10 employees
- Small enterprises have up to 50 employees
- Medium-sized enterprises have up to 250 employees.

The European definition of SME follows: "The category of micro, small and medium-sized enterprises (SMEs) is made up of enterprises which employ fewer than 250 persons and which have an annual turnover not exceeding 50 million euro, and/or an annual balance sheet total not exceeding 43 million euro." In order to prepare for an evaluation and revision of some features of the small and medium-sized enterprises definition European Union established public consultation period from 6 February 2018 to 6 May 2018. Public consultation is available for all EU member country citizens and organizations. Especially, national and regional authorities, enterprises, business associations or organizations, venture capital providers, research and academic institutions, and individual citizens are expected as the main contributors.

EU member states have had individual definitions of what constitutes an SME. For example, the definition in Germany had a limit of 255 employees, while in Belgium it could have been 100. The result is that while a Belgian business of 249 employees would be taxed at full rate in Belgium, it would nevertheless be eligible for SME subsidy under a European-labelled programme.

SMEs are a crucial element in the supplier network of large enterprises which are already on their way towards Industry 4.0. According to German economist Hans-Heinrich Bass, "empirical research on SME as well as policies to promote SME have a long tradition in [West] Germany, dating back into the 19th century. Until the mid-20th century, most researchers considered SME as an impediment to further economic development and SME policies were thus designed in the framework of social policies. Only the Ordoliberalism school, the founding fathers of Germany's social market economy, discovered their strengths, considered SME as a solution to mid-20th century economic problems (mass unemployment, abuse of economic power), and laid the foundations for non-selective (functional) industrial policies to promote SMEs." Only around 20% of European SMEs are substantially digitalized, compared to almost 50% of major businesses. Small and medium-sized companies make up 56.2% of the non-financial sector.

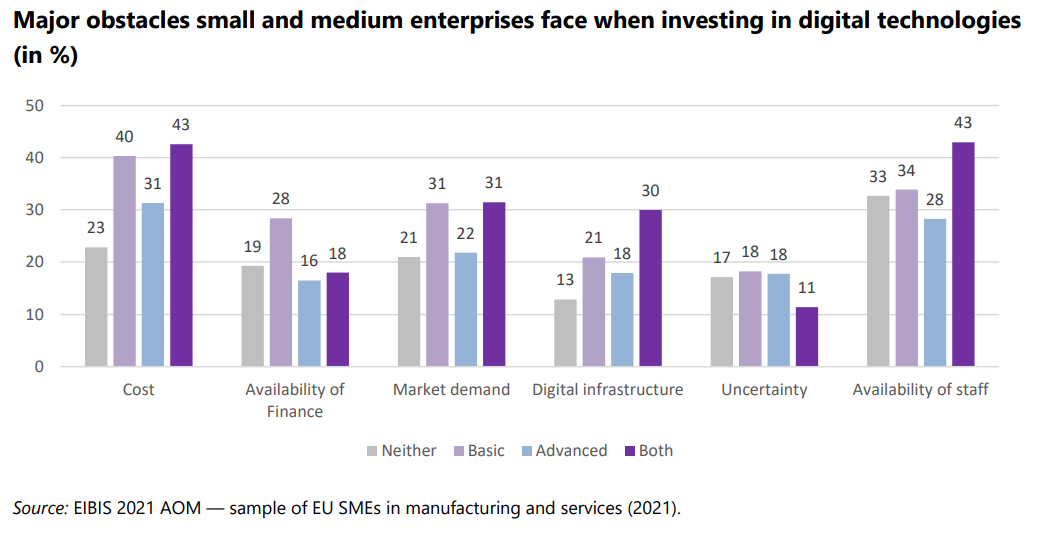
Obstacles faced by small and medium enterprises when investing in digital technologies

Smaller companies account for more than 60% of the value contributed to the non-financial sector in Belgium, Italy, and Spain, three of the nations worst hit by the COVID-19 pandemic. An estimated 50% of Europe's small firms may fail because they lack the substantial financial reserves required to weather the crisis.

With around 338,000 functioning in Bulgaria in 2022, SMEs and mid-caps are major contributors in the Bulgarian economy. They also employ over 75% of the workforce and create 65% of the economy's added value.

The results of an EU survey conducted in 2021 suggest that during the pandemic, in countries with larger fiscal packages, SMEs were on average more likely to experience bankruptcy even after controlling for the size of the shock, the use of bank financing, and country and sector fixed effects. When policy assistance rises by 1% of GDP, the probabilities of bankruptcy for an SME are 2.7 times higher than for a non-SME. Credit limitations are especially difficult for SMEs and new businesses to overcome. Credit constraints affect 24% of SMEs and 27% of young businesses.

Medium-sized firms are ahead of SMEs in terms of digital technology adoption, with performance comparable to that of larger enterprises. Over 84% of XL businesses invested in at least one digital technology, compared to approximately 75% for mid-caps.

Since the COVID-19 pandemic began in early 2020, SMEs in Europe have suffered unprecedented economic instability and turbulence. In 2023, they faced further challenges, including higher input costs, higher borrowing costs and uncertainty.

As a result, the SME value added in the European Union, adjusted for inflation, remains below the pre-crisis level of 2019, and is anticipated to fall further in 2024.

Inflation's impact is more pronounced for small and medium-sized enterprises, with the probability of increased investment rising by 4.3 percentage points compared to a smaller 1.7 percentage point increase for larger firms, as of 2024. Rising energy costs led to a 5.6 percentage point increase in planned investments in energy efficiency, largely driven by SMEs, increasing from 52.3% to 57.9% in 2022.

In the European Union, SMEs have played a significant role in advancing the goals of the Green Deal. Many SMEs increased their planned investments in energy efficiency by 5.6% in 2022, from 52.3% to 57.9%. The European Green Deal's emphasis on energy efficiency aligned with this trend, helping to drive investments aimed at reducing emissions and energy consumption.

==== Poland ====
The SME sector in Poland generates almost 50% of the GDP, and out of that, for instance, in 2011, micro companies generated 29.6%, small companies 7.7%, and medium companies 10.4% (big companies 24.0%; other entities 16.5%, and revenues from customs duties and taxes generated 11.9%). In 2011, out of the total of 1,784,603 entities operating in Poland, merely 3,189 were classified as "large", so 1,781,414 were micro, small, or medium. SMEs employed 6.3 million people out of the total of 9.0 million of labour employed in the private sector. In Poland in 2011 there were 36.2 SMEs per 1,000 inhabitants.

Nearly seven million people are employed by small businesses in Poland, which accounts for around half of the country's GDP, yet smaller businesses are less likely than larger ones to invest in strategies to combat climate change or boost energy efficiency. In October 2021, the Bank Ochrony Środowiska, a Polish bank that specializes in funding environmental protection initiatives received €75 million from the European Investment Bank (EIB) for these small enterprises.

The Polish bank wants to use at least 50% of the loan for initiatives with a clear emphasis on tackling climate change, such improving building energy efficiency or turning to renewable energy sources like solar power. The money is set to be distributed across Poland, with around 80% of it projected to go to cohesive regions.

==== Slovenia ====
Slovenia's one-stop-shops for SMEs were recognised by the European Commission in 2008 as a good practice example in making public administration responsive to SME need.

=== Outside the EU ===
==== Norway ====
In Norway it is normal to describe small and medium-sized businesses as businesses with fewer than 100 employees. Businesses with 1–20 employees are defined as small, while businesses with 21–100 employees are considered medium-sized. A business with more than 100 employees would be considered a large business. "Micro-sized businesses" is a little-used expression in Norway.NHO

Small and medium-sized businesses make up more than 99% of all businesses in Norway, and together they employ 47% of all employees in the private sector. Together, SMEs account for 44% of the economic value added each year: almost 700 billion Norwegian Kroner (NOK).Fakta om små og mellomstore bedrifter (SMB)

==== Switzerland ====
In Switzerland, the Federal Statistical Office defines small and medium-sized enterprises as companies with less than 250 employees. The categories are the following:

- Microentreprises: 1 to 9 employees
- Small enterprises: 10 to 49 employees
- Medium-sized enterprises: 50 to 249 employees
- Large enterprises: 250 employees or more

==== United Kingdom ====
In the United Kingdom (UK), a company is defined as being an SME if it meets two out of three criteria: it has a turnover of less than £25m, it has fewer than 250 employees, it has gross assets of less than £12.5m. Very small companies are called in the UK micro-entities, which have simpler financial reporting requirements. Such micro-enterprises must meet any two of the following criteria: balance sheet £316,000 or less; turnover £632,000 or less; employees 10 or less.

Many small and medium-sized businesses form part of the UK's currently growing Mittelstand, or Brittelstand as it is also sometimes named. These are businesses in Britain that are not only small or medium but also have a much broader set of values and more elastic definition.

The Department for Business Innovation and Skills estimated that at the start of 2014, 99.3% of UK private sector businesses were SMEs, with their £1.6 trillion annual turnover accounting for 47% of private sector turnover.

In order to support SMEs, the UK government set a target in 2010 "that 25% of government's spend, either directly or in supply chains, goes to SMEs by 2015"; it achieved this by 2013.

=== North America ===
==== Canada ====
Industry Canada defines a small business as one with fewer than 100 paid employees, and a medium-sized business as one with at least 100 and fewer than 500 employees. As of December 2012, there were 1,107,540 employer businesses in Canada of the rally. Canadian controlled private corporations receive a 17% reduction in the tax rate on taxable income from active businesses up to $500,000. This small business deduction is reduced for corporations whose taxable capital exceeds $10M and is eliminated for corporations whose taxable capital exceeds $15M. It has been estimated that almost $2 trillion of Canadian SMEs will be coming up for sale over the next decade, which is twice as large as the assets of the top 1,000 Canadian pension plans and approximately the same size as Canadian annual GDP.

==== Mexico ====
The small and medium-sized companies in Mexico are called PYMEs, which is a direct translation of SMEs. There is also another categorization in the country called MiPyMEs. The MiPyMEs are micro, small and medium-sized businesses, with an emphasis on micro which are one man companies or a type of freelance.

Number of workers
Sector/Size	Industrial	Commerce	Services
Micro	0-10	0-10	0-10
Small	11-50	11-30	11-50
Medium	51-250	31-100	51-100

==== United States ====
In the United States, the Small Business Administration sets small business criteria based on industry, ownership structure, revenue and number of employees (which in some circumstances may be as high as 1500, although the cap is typically 500). Both the US and the EU generally use the same threshold of fewer than 10 employees for businesses designated as small office/home office (SOHO). Small business are the nation's largest employer, representing 37% of American workers contrasted with large businesses that employ 36% of the U.S. workforce.

=== Oceania ===
==== Australia ====
In Australia, an SME has 200 or fewer employees. Micro Businesses have 1–4 employees, small businesses 5–19, medium businesses 20–199, and large businesses 200+. Australian SMEs make up 98% of all Australian businesses, produce one-third of total GDP, and employ 4.7 million people. SMEs represent 90 percent of all goods exporters and over 60% of services exporters.

==== New Zealand ====
In New Zealand, 99% of businesses employ 50 or less staff, and the official definition of a small business is one with 19 or fewer employees. It is estimated that approximately 28% of New Zealand's gross domestic product is produced by companies with fewer than 20 employees.

== See also ==
- Big business
- Environmental regulation of small and medium enterprises
- Hidden champions
- Micro-enterprise
- Mittelstand
- Small and medium enterprises in Mexico
- Small business
