= Small and medium enterprises in Mexico =

Small and medium enterprises in Mexico, generally called PyMEs (Spanish: pequeña y mediana empresa), are an important segment of the Mexican economy. They are classified in two types of small and medium enterprises: family businesses and non-family businesses.

The Mexican Government has supported PyMEs since 2004. The Mexican Chamber of Economy with the help of the Mexican government creates different types of programs for PyMEs that need to improve their participation in the national market and also for the international market. The PyMEs' size is classified by the number of employees they have. The main sectors are manufacturing, commerce and service.

== PyMEs in Mexico ==
As of 2006 there were about 4 million enterprises in Mexico. Out of those 4 million, 99.8% were small and medium enterprises. About 52% of the Mexican GDP is generated by small and medium size enterprises, while the remaining 48% relies on large enterprises. Small and medium size enterprises make up 72% of the formal employment in Mexico. PyMEs are subdivided into: 15% for Micro, 14.5% for small and 22.5% for medium enterprises.

PyMes can be classified by type and size. There is a manufacturing, commerce, and service type. Within these, PyMEs are classified according to the number of employees—10, 50, 250 and more than 250 respectively—into micro, small, medium, and large enterprises. Service enterprises are classed by those with have 10, 50, 100, and more than 100 employees.

PyMEs throughout the nation are distributed by region. About 38% of them in the central part of the country, 17% are located southwest, 6% are southeast, 12% are northeast and 27% are center-west.

There are two types of PyMEs in Mexico (according to their origin). Those that began as family businesses and those formed by formal partnership. The ones that start as family business are small and only very few of them have some type of projection abroad. These are usually the ones who search for government support mainly for financial and training purposes. The other type of small and Medium size enterprises in Mexico are those who follow an established path. An example of this could be franchises; these do not have a problem expanding abroad. Franchises are small projection of big enterprises who have already done market research before entering a new zone. They have all the possible experience on expanding overseas and very little risk on failing because in most cases they go under the concept of a high brand awareness.

PyMEs have been an important part of the country's development, especially in the area of exports. Due to their small size they are versatile, dynamic and have growth potential. This potential also includes entering international markets. They are a major source of job creation in the country and are the most likely to implement new technologies. Since many are located in different regions of the country, they foment local development. The main contribution to enterprise growth lies with PyMEs. The importance of small and medium size enterprises in Mexico has grown through time due to the positive effect these businesses have had on Mexico's economy. Since these enterprises continue to become more important, the government is focusing a lot on supporting them.

On the other hand, they also have some disadvantages. In general PyMEs have not developed the habit of reinvesting to improve production or reinvest in equipment. They do not have enough economic resources to hire specialized employees nor to train current ones. This and lack of foresight can lead to insufficient sales, lack of competitiveness, inadequate customer service, low quality and higher prices. Because of the lack of quality control, legal problems such as dealing with VATs and defective products becomes an issue.

== Programs for PyME developments ==
Since 2004, Mexican government has had a number of programs to support PyMEs so that they help Mexico's economic growth. The government has two groups of programs to support PyMEs. The first group helps PyMEs to grow within the national market. The main programs are Emerging Programs, Productive Projects, Centros Mexico Emprende (Mexico undertake program), National System of Loan Guaranties, and Enterprises Consultancy.

The main objective of the Programas Emergentes (Emerging Programs) is to help the economic areas that have been affected by natural disasters. This program achieves this objective through loans with special payment conditions. This help is given to the PyMEs that have lost revenue and the ability to generate revenue because of a natural disaster. The Emerging Programs are coordinated and supervised by "Fondo PyMe." The regulations that this organization point out is that the PyMEs are supported with special resources with the concepts that the directive council determine that are essential to the economic reactivation of the enterprises. These enterprises have to satisfy certain conditions.

Proyectos Productivos (Productive Projects) helps to finance investment projects that improve the competitiveness of PyMes. This helps to trigger the creation and maintenance of jobs and regional development. The most important project is the financing. These funds are mostly targeted to production projects. The projects have to help by developing, expanding and consolidating the enterprise.

The Centros Mexico Emprende (Mexico undertake program) is for the execution of public or private services to support PyMEs. The support is given in a comprehensive, accessible, lively, and timely way according to the size and the enterprises potential. The different types of center concepts are: fitting out and infrastructure, designing and updating information systems for planning, and measuring of results generated from the "Centros Mexico Emprende."

Sistema Nacional de Garantias (National System of Loan Guaranties) provides PyMEs with easy access to the financing programs with competitive conditions and payment periods.

The Consultoria Empresarial (Enterprises Consultancy) is a program that helps PyMEs be more productive and profitable. It achieves this objective through the identification of business intervention programs. These programs are applied to one or more fundamental areas of an enterprise as training and consultancy and the development of instructors and consultants.

== Programs for existing PyMEs and international expansion ==
The second group helps PyMEs to maintain a place and to succeed in the international market. The SPyME (Subsecretaría para la Pequeña y Mediana Empresa) was created to promote, encourage, and design tools and programs with the purpose of creating, consolidating and developing micro, small, and medium enterprises in the international market. The Sub-secretary for Small and Medium Enterprise (SPYME), with the purpose of helping primarily small enterprises, created the Programa Nacional de Capacitación y Consultoría (National Program for Training and Consultancy). This program incorporates improvement actions in areas where weaknesses or opportunities are detected. The program stimulates the consolidation of the entrepreneurship through actions like the instrumentation of innovative methodologies in productive priority sectors. The program also foments the application of strategic programs to improve enterprises management.

=== National Program of Training and Consultancy (Programa Nacional de Capacitación y Consulta) ===
The Programa de Consultoría General (Program of General Consultancy), that was created for the projects of major demand identified by chambers and managerial associations, that as well as for state and municipal governments, will look for the support of the Fondo PyME (Fund SME). This program was made to take care of the needs of training and consultancy, across proven methodologies that assure they will have quantifiable results.

The Programa Moderniza (Modernization Program), the Secretary of Economy (SE) and the Secretary of Tourism (SECTUR) started a System of Management named "Modernize" that allows to improve the quality of the services offered to the Micro, Small and Medium Enterprises of the tourist sector. The Secretary of Tourism carries out the consultants' formation, which are the only ones authorized to execute the program and to register in SECTUR.

The Formación de Consultores PyME – JICA (SME Consultants' Formation – JICA) establishes the formation of advisers specialized in the methodology of the Japan International Cooperation Agency (JICA). The process is based on the application of Japanese tools of improvements of high impact with a lower cost. It lasts approximately 1.5 months and is directed to consultants with more than three years of experience in managerial consultancy. This has allowed relying on a base of specialized consultants that multiplies the efforts to offer specialized services of consultancy that generate more competitive enterprises.

The Consultoría Empresarial PyME (SME Managerial Consultancy-JICA) stimulates the development and consolidation of the MIPyMES by the application of a model of integral attention of standardized consultancy, carried out by the consultants PYME-JICA and accredited by the Secretary of Economy. The process of consultancy that is offered in the facilities of the company lasts from 3 to 4 months, and is directed for MIPYMES, preferably with two years of operation. The Fondo PyME (Fund SME), along with the National Program of Consultancy PYME-JICA, helps with subsidies that go from 30 to 70 percent of the total cost of the service of managerial consultancy.

== PyMEs Exports ==
It is proven that many economies are based on their exports. Well organized and structured PyMEs can be a significant source of exports. For this reason, the Mexican government gives special attention to PyMEs in this regard, allocating a big part of its economic resources to help small and medium size enterprises expand overseas. Supported PyMEs can mean increasing exports and a more open economy.

The "Subsecretaria para la pequena y mediana empresa" (SPyME) was founded to design, foment and promote programs and other tools that have as objective the creation, consolidation and development of micro, small and medium size enterprises.

About 59% of Mexico's exports are controlled by 30% of the total enterprises in the country. Out of all the PyMEs existing only 9% of them export, while the remaining 83% do not have any type of presence overseas. International Commerce in Mexico is mainly based on large enterprises; this is why government is very interested on giving assistance and financial help to small businesses.

Out of all the exporting enterprises in Mexico only 64,000 are PyMEs. They are located mostly in the center part of the country, northeast and center-west.

There are many ways PyMEs can be supported in Mexico:

- Fiscal support to Mexican exporters,
- VAT return or VAT compensation,
- Programs of foment for the manufacturing industry,
- Export services (IMMEX),
- Programs for sectorial promotion,
- The Drawback Program (through which Government offers VAT returns to Mexican small businesses that export to a country that has imposed tariffs on imports),
- Government benefits to high level exporting enterprises (ALTEX),
- Government benefits to International commerce enterprises (ECEX),
- Mechanisms of Indirect Exports such as VAT elimination or Application of 0% VAT on exports,
- Mixed Commission for the Promotion of exports (COMPEX),
- An annual incentive named National Exporting Price,
- Government aid, such as information or opportunities to expand overseas, consultancy and training,
- Commercial opportunities such as market analysis,
- Selection and establishment of contact with client within the foreign market, and
- Government support for PyMEs though a positioning process.

The most important programs supporting for exports are Financing, Consultancy, Training, Exporting, Technical Assistance and Information on exports.

The services that the Programa Nacional de Franquicias (Exemption National Program) offers to PyMES are: commercialization, consultancy and financing. Likewise, they approach entrepreneurs, MIPyMES and owners of exemptions, to give them support that offer the opportunity to start a new business taking advantage of the experience of an exemption, stimulate successful business to turn them into exemptions, and develop new exemptions. The program also supports the consolidation of existing exemptions, export models of Mexican exemptions, and strengthens the positioning of the brand of the existing exemptions and helps to realize the re-engineering of existing models of exemptions.

The PyMExporta Centers are federal, state and local organizations who have the objective of helping the PyMEs that have the special interest to start, increase, or to diversify their exports worldwide. This organizations join efforts with the Business Mexican Sector to achieve this aim.

Some of the advantages and benefits that the centers bring to PyMEs are the training of the export process, a specialized consultancy for the development of export projects, the possibility of being able of promote the PyMEs in the international market, consultancy in customs Mexico requirements, information about markets and legal regulations for exports and the support in the tasks of logistics and management. The PyMExporta Centers work with their own register methodology, accompaniment and management of institutional supports according with what the businesses require. The supporting service is personal and specialized for each need of the enterprises.

Services are given depending on the levels of the identification of the enterprises potential, in case the enterprises have the facilities to export its product a document will be signed for the development of each process stage of the export. The commerce strategy identifies the requirements of the product, it supports and advises the businessman since the beginning of the contract of international sale until the end of the sale.

== See also ==
- Mexican economy
- List of companies of Mexico
- List of hotels in Mexico
- List of Mexican brands
