= Relojes Centenario =

Mexican clock manufacturer

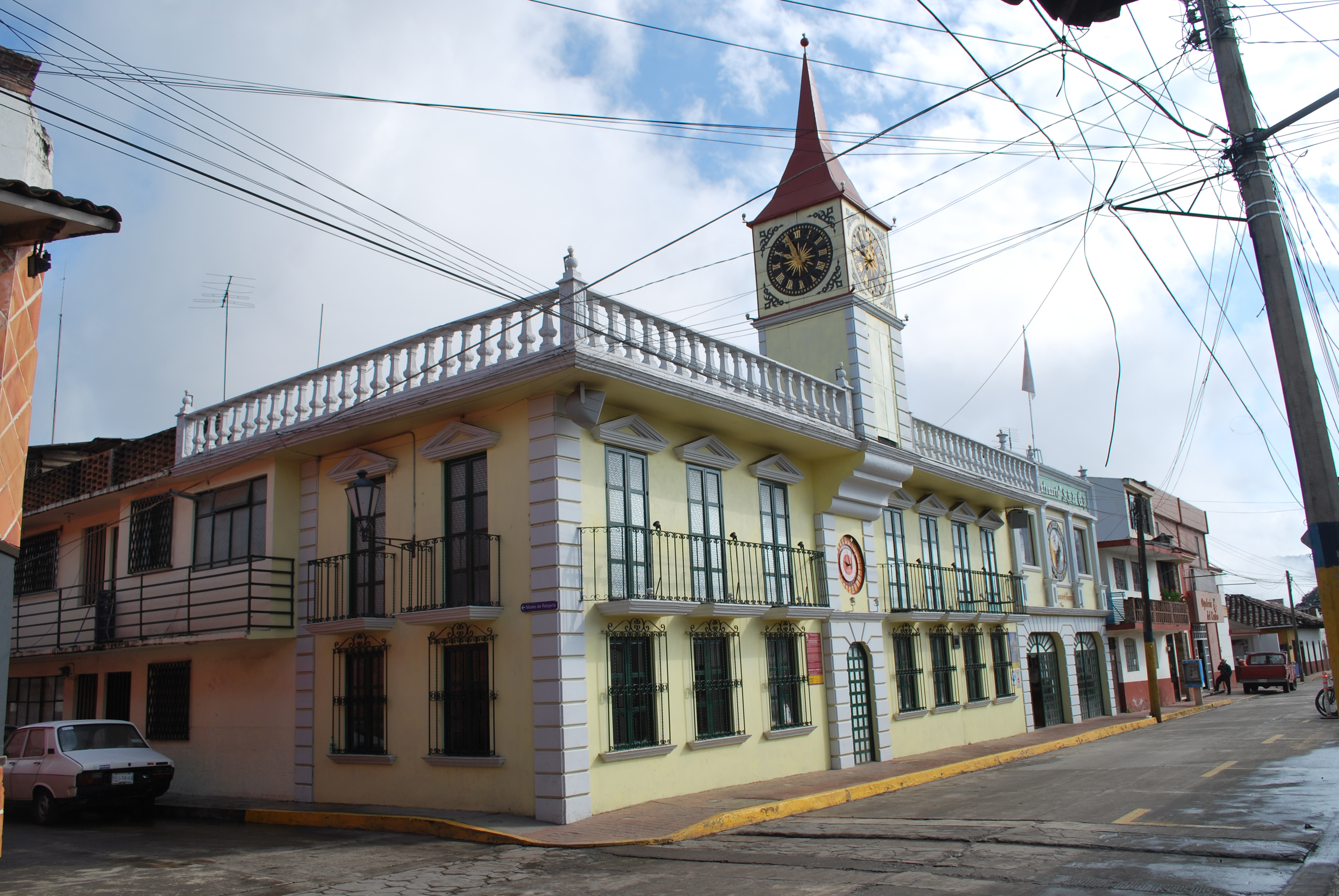
Relojes Centenario in Zacatlán, Puebla

Relojes Centenario (or Centenario Clocks) is the first manufacturer of monumental clocks in Latin America. It was founded by Alberto Olvera Hernández in the municipality of Zacatlán, Puebla, Mexico as a workshop on the family farm when he was a teenager. His first clock was for the family farm but the next one went to the main church in Chignahuapan, which still functions to this day. The name Centenario was adopted in 1921 to mark the centennial of the end of the Mexican War of Independence. To date, the company has built over 2,000 monumental clocks for churches, government buildings and more as well as repaired Mexican and European built clocks. There are Centenario clocks in most part of Mexico and the company sells abroad as well. In 1993, the company opened a Clock Museum in the upper level of the factory, with both the museum and factory open to the public free of charge.

== Alberto Olvera Hernández ==
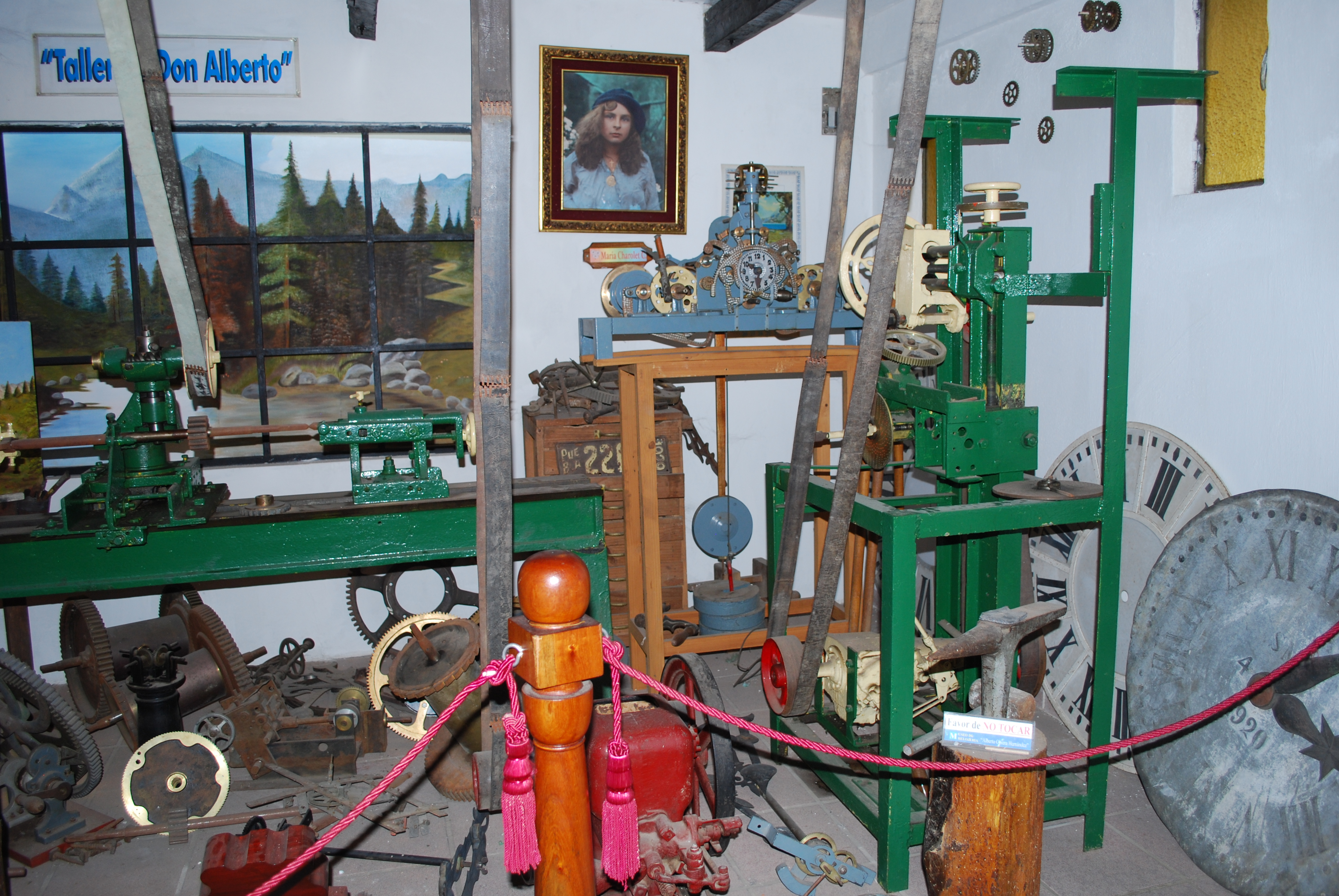
machinery from the workshop of Olvera Hernández

Alberto Olvera Hernández was born on March 2, 1892, at the Coyotepec farm outside the town of Zacatlán, Puebla. He showed a mechanical aptitude early fixing and inventing machines, receiving a patent in 1920 a track changer for electric trains. His interest in clocks came when a clock on the chimney of his home broke down and he took it apart to try and fix it. In 1912, at 17 years of age, he began to construct his first monumental clock using junk and wood from the family farm. He then built a clock workshop at the farm where he would work until 1929, with the business of building clocks already successful enough to have a helper and various apprentices.

He moved his workshop to the town of Zacatlán to establish "Relojes Centenario" (Centenario Clocks) which remains in the same place to this day. His work earned him several honors including an "Honor al Mérito" and the "Medalla Xiutec" from the government Zacatlán in 1966. He died in the town in 1980.

== History of the company ==
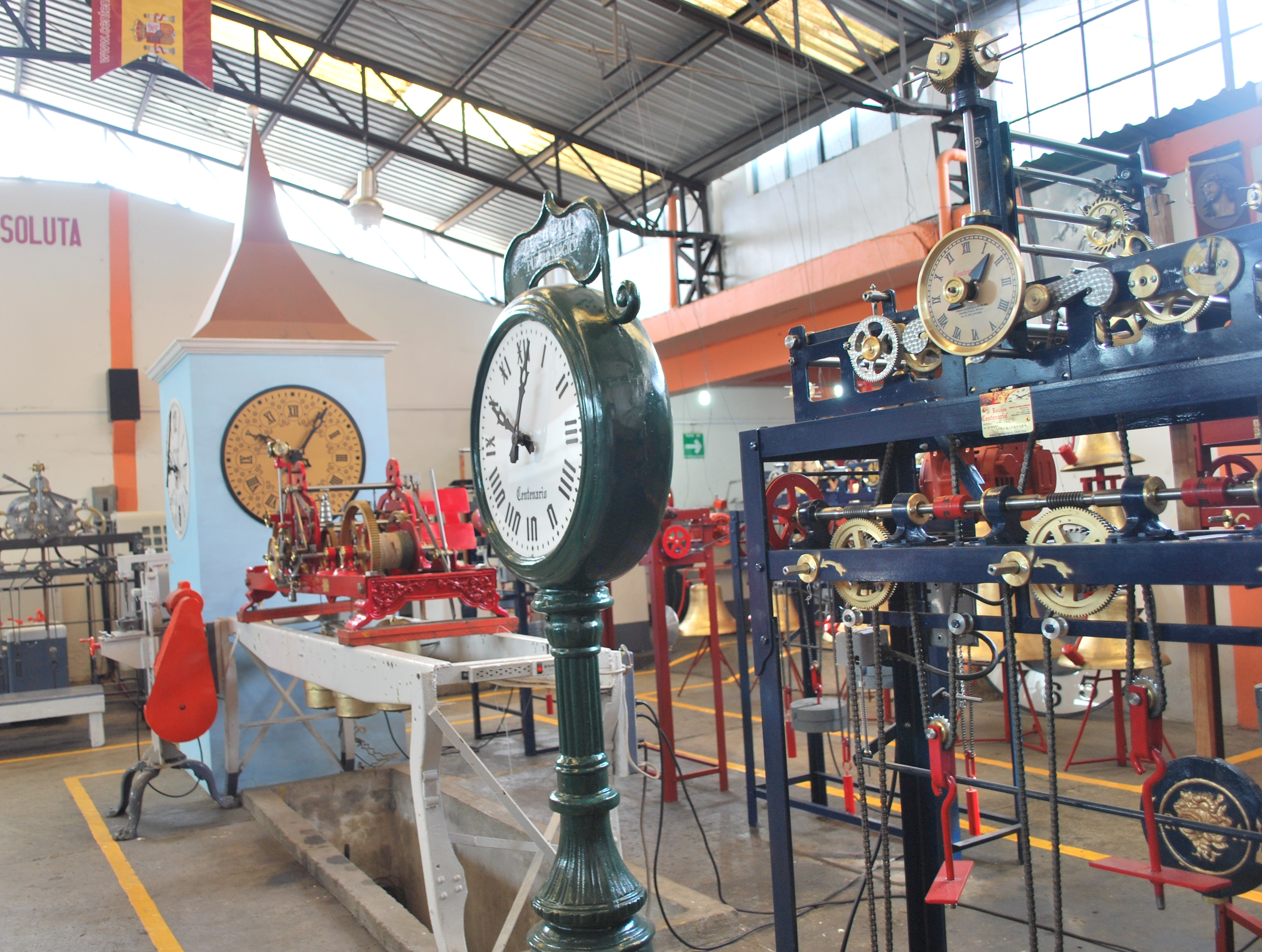
View of factory floor

From 1918 to the present, Olvera Hernández and Centenario has manufactured more than 2,000 which have been installed in churches, municipal palaces, other government buildings, towers, shopping centers, hotels and other places. They have restored and automated more than 600 monumental clocks of European origin. They service clocks in various parts of Mexico, and train locals in the care and maintenance of clocks they install.

The first clock installed outside of the family farm was the clock for the Santiago Apostol Church in Chignahuapan in 1919, which took a year to build. This clock is still working. The next clock was installed in Libres in 1921. The name Relojes Centenario was adopted that same year, the centennial of the end of the Mexican War of Independence. It is the first maker of monumental clocks in Latin America. In 1930, Olvera Hernandez founded his own homestead called La Quinta María where he installed the second workshop of Centenario. The current location in the center of Zacatlán was acquired in 1966, allowing the company to increase production. In 1975, the business became a legal corporation.

The company is currently run by the sons and grandsons of Olvera Hernandez. The current general manager is José Luis Olvera Charolet. Each year, they install between seventy and eighty in locations in Mexico and abroad. There are over 1,500 Centenario clocks in Mexico alone.}

In 1982, the business opened an office in Mexico City in Colonia Tepeyac Insurgentes. In 1986, the company construction the floral clock located in the main square of Zacatlán. It has two faces five meters in diameter controlled by the same mechanism and nine mechanical carillons. This clocks chimes a variety of tunes. The clock is the first of its type and has become a symbol for the town.

In 1993, the clock museum was inaugurated, named after Olvera Hernandez. The gift shop, called the "La Casa del Tiempo" was opened in 2003. In the 2000s, the company experimented with digital chimes including those programmed for funeral songs and "Ave Maria."

According to general manager José Luis Olvera Charolet, each clock is unique with no two quite the same. One of the most notable clocks by the company is the flower clock in the Parque Hundido in Mexico City, one of the largest in the world, which occupies a space of 78 m2 and has a ten meter wide face. Another clock is that in the Nuestra Señora del Roble basilica in Monterrey, which has four faces of four meters in diameter each. The floral clock in Zacatlán was installed in 1986. It has nine different melodies and which get played depend on the time of year and time of day, playing four times each 24-hour period. The hours of this clock are 6am, 10am, 2pm and 9pm in order not to interfere with the hours of mass. Another clock is in Tulantepec, Hidalgo (near Tulancingo), which chimes the national anthem at 6am and 6pm along with the "Himno Guadalupano" dedicated to the Virgin of Guadalupe. It also has different chimes for each quarter-hour. The clock is completely automated through a system of counterweights. Good monumental clocks have carillons to sound out their chimes. Tunes are chosen by customers usually based on the area's musical traditions as well as personal preferences. One of the clocks installed in Torreón plays La Filomena each hour. The floral clock in Tuxtla Gutiérrez plays the Tuxtla waltz and La Chiapanecas. The clock in Santa Bárbara, a small mining town in Chihuahua, plays Amor Perdido. The company also repairs many of the country's German and French clocks which were installed in the late 19th and early 20th century.

== Clock museum ==
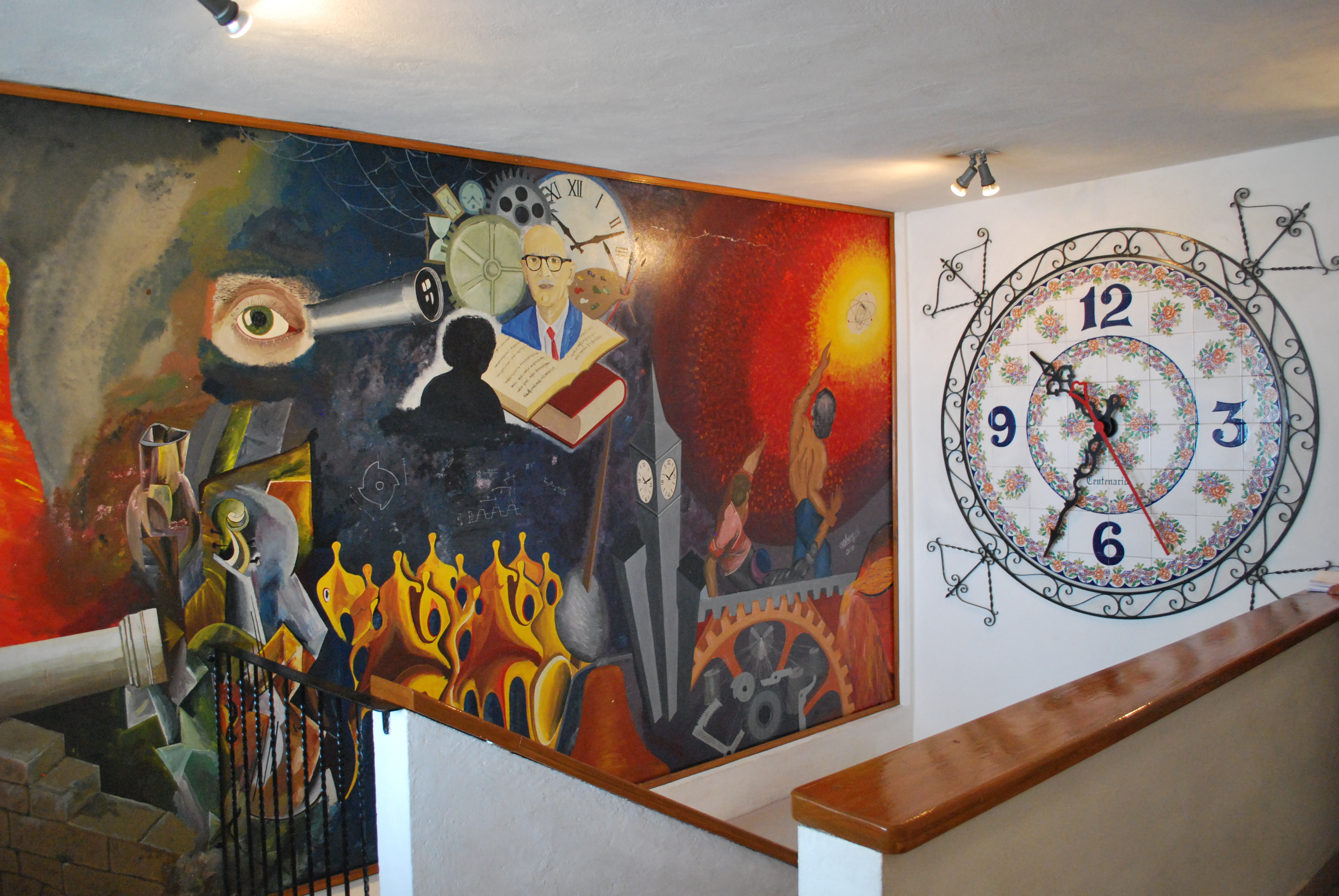
View of the stairwell to the clock museum

The Museo de Relojería Alberto Olvera Hernández or Alberto Olvera Hernández Clock Museum was founded in 1993 and named after the founder of Centenario Clocks. It contains replica and original timepieces to demonstrate methods of measuring time over history. These include sundials used 2000 BCE, candle "clocks" with markings for hours, and similar timepieces but with oil lamps. There are numerous examples of mechanical clocks. One unique piece is a clock statue of Merlin the magician, whose arms point to the time but only for twelve hours a day. During the night hours, his arms "rest." Entrance to the factory and museum is free. The museum is reached by walking through the factory, which is open to visitors, who can see all the processes from the smelting of metal to the final test of the completed piece. The museum is connected to the factory floor by a stairwell which has a mural. This mural depicts the relevant life events of Alberto Olvera Hernandez. Olvera Hernandez appears in the center of a ring of icons related to time, and books related to his self training as well as a profile of his wife, Maria Charolet. Below are twelve figures representing his twelve children and well as the violin and mandolin which he played.
