= Sol de Mexico Tequila =

Sol de Mexico is a brand of 100% blue agave tequila produced by Productos Regionales de Atotonilco, S.A. de C.V. This brand has over 50 years history.

== History ==
The history of Sol de Mexico tequila began in 1951 when Paschal Don Gonzalez Gutierrez and his son Juan Gonzalez Ramirez planted their first agave seeds in the highland fields of Jalisco, Mexico. Today, great grandson Cesar Gonzalez continues the tradition of distilling. Under Cesar's leadership, Sol de Mexico developed a luxury spirit.

The distillation process from harvest to bottling has been managed by a recognized Master Distiller Don Salvador Fonseca.

Sol de Mexico has been available in the USA since October 2008 owing to cooperation with UA Imports LLC.

== Varieties ==
- Blanco Tequila - clear and un-aged
- Reposado Tequila - with a light-golden color, aged in oak bourbon barrels for several months, with a more characteristically wooden taste
- Añejo Tequila - with an even smoother and more wooden flavor

== Awards ==
All Sol de Mexico tequila varieties won gold medals at the Beverage Testing Institute of Chicago in 2008 as well as gold and silver medals at San Francisco World Spirits Competition in 2009. These tequilas also received high ratings from Tequila.net.
