= Tornel =

Current logo.

Logo used until 2008.

Tornel or Hulera Tornel is a Mexican enterprise and only surviving Mexican tire manufacturer in Mexico, dedicated to making tires and other automotive industry-related products. Founded in 1933 by Mexican businessman Armando Tornel, who in October 2006 entered the Worldwide Tire Industry Hall of Fame. Hulera Tornel is the top Latin American tire manufacturer, and one of the largest tire manufacturers currently active in the world.

== History ==
Compañía Hulera Tornel is a Mexican tire manufacturer currently part of JK Tyre group of India.

Compañía Hulera Tornel was originally founded by the Tornel family, one of the oldest families in Mexico, renown in the Mexican industry and society. The company was founded by Isauro Tornel Toriz and his eldest son, Armando Tornel Murillo, native from El Salto de Juanacatlán, Jalisco, Mexico. Armando entered the tire business when he was only 15 years old, while working as a tire seller at the same time he was studying in the night school of San Indelfonso in Mexico City. Years later, his father Mr. Isauro Tornel Toriz decided to send Armando to the United States, where he pursued a technical career in Tire Engineering at Smithers Laboratories, and rubber technology at Vanderbilt Laboratories, gaining technical and practical experience at Goodyear and Mohawk, both in Akron, Ohio. Upon Armando´s return to Mexico during 1933, he partnered with his father and his younger brothers Salvador and Raúl, and together they opened a tire-sale business with 27 employees, at a store located at Hidalgo Avenue number 91, in the historic downtown area of Mexico City.

In 1937, the Tornel family business was formalized via incorporation of Compañía Hulera El Centenario, company that manufactures and marketed at the time tires under the America and All States brands. In 1940 the Tornel family associated with Firestone through a joint venture, changing the name of the company to "Cía. Hulera Firestone Centenario". Some years later, the Tornel family decided to sell their stock to Firestone, and independently pursued continuity in the tire business on their own by incorporating the wholly owned Compañía Hulera Tornel (Tornel Rubber Company), manufacturing tires as well as rubber and supplies for tire repair.

Under Compañía Hulera Tornel, Armando assumed the position of Chair of the company’s board, while his brothers Raul and Salvador occupied other key positions as senior members of the company's Board of Directors until their deaths. In the 1950s Compañía Hulera Tornel entered other sectors and started manufacturing bicycle tubes and also devised new manufacturing techniques. In 1968 it expanded to manufacturing bicycle tires as well.

Compañía Hulera Tornel remained in the Tornel family for 4 generations.

=== Development, consolidation and sale to the JK Group ===
In the 1970s the company started to grow dramatically within the closed economy then existing in Mexico, and also began to compete with other national tire companies like General Popo, Euzkadi, and the oldest of all, Hercules. At this time Compañía Hulera Tornel began to launch most of its modern products such as the tire tubes manufactured with point technology and dabbled in making tires for trucks and buses.

The 1980s brought a crisis to the Mexican economy due to devaluations that caused the closing of Tornel's competitors: General Popo, Euzkadi and Hercules. When the company saw these closings, they paid attention and steered the business toward specializing in the retail vehicle and truck sales niche. This move allowed them to adapt and later thrive in the market. The closing of these competitor factories allowed Tornel free rein in the market but not for long since soon after competition began from foreign tire manufacturers which would turn out to be aggressive commercial rivals, such as Goodyear, Bridgestone, Michelin, Firestone, and BFGoodrich. However, despite the incursion of foreign companies, the market position and Tornel prestige was not diminished. After four generations of members of the Tornel family running the company, in 2008 Compañía Hulera Tornel was acquired by JK Tyre of India.

== Today ==
In May 2008, Tornel was purchased by India-based JK Tyre for $68 million. JK Tyre is an Indian tyre manufacturer that is about the 23rd largest in the world. It intends to use Tornel as the base for its approach to the North American market taking advantage of the NAFTA, and is investing in molds to manufacture tires under both the Tornel and JK brands. Tornel has a total of three manufacturing facilities, all within the metropolitan area of Mexico City. Before the sale of the company, the Tornel family assisted to the ceremony in Las Vegas, Nevada where Armando Tornel was granted a place in the Tire Industry Association Hall of Fame in October 2006.
