= CLABE =

Mexican banking standard

The CLABE (Clave Bancaria Estandarizada, Spanish for "standardized banking cipher" or "standardized bank code") is a banking standard for the numbering of bank accounts in Mexico. This standard is a requirement for the sending and receiving of domestic inter-bank electronic funds transfer since June 1, 2004.

The CLABE replaces the Mexican account numbering scheme where the account number has 11 digits, when it comes to electronic transfers. The provision for CLABE standardization was issued by the Asociación de Bancos de México (ABM) (Mexican Bank Association) in conjunction with the Banco de México (Mexico's Central Bank). It ensures that the inter-bank fund transfers, payroll deposits, or automatic service charges are made to the correct accounts.

== Structure ==
The 18 digits of the CLABE follows this structure:

- 3 Digits: Bank Code
- 3 Digits: Branch Office Code
- 11 Digits: Account Number
- 1 Digit : Control Digit

== Bank code ==
In Mexico, banking institutions are identified by a three-digit number assigned by the ABM. The following table is a Bank Catalogue provided by El Servicio de Administración Tributaria (SAT.gob.mx), as of December 4, 2014:

ABM code	Short name	Corporate/business name
002	BANAMEX	Banco Nacional de México, S.A., Institución de Banca Múltiple, Grupo Financiero Banamex
006	BANCOMEXT	Banco Nacional de Comercio Exterior, Sociedad Nacional de Crédito, Institución de Banca de Desarrollo
009	BANOBRAS	Banco Nacional de Obras y Servicios Públicos, Sociedad Nacional de Crédito, Institución de Banca de Desarrollo
012	BBVA BANCOMER	BBVA Bancomer, S.A., Institución de Banca Múltiple, Grupo Financiero BBVA Bancomer
014	SANTANDER	Banco Santander (México), S.A., Institución de Banca Múltiple, Grupo Financiero Santander
019	BANJERCITO	Banco Nacional del Ejército, Fuerza Aérea y Armada, Sociedad Nacional de Crédito, Institución de Banca de Desarrollo
021	HSBC	HSBC México, S.A., Institución De Banca Múltiple, Grupo Financiero HSBC
030	BAJIO	Banco del Bajío, S.A., Institución de Banca Múltiple
032	IXE	IXE Banco, S.A., Institución de Banca Múltiple, IXE Grupo Financiero
036	INBURSA	Banco Inbursa, S.A., Institución de Banca Múltiple, Grupo Financiero Inbursa
037	INTERACCIONES	Banco Interacciones, S.A., Institución de Banca Múltiple
042	MIFEL	Banca Mifel, S.A., Institución de Banca Múltiple, Grupo Financiero Mifel
044	SCOTIABANK	Scotiabank Inverlat, S.A.
058	BANREGIO	Banco Regional de Monterrey, S.A., Institución de Banca Múltiple, Banregio Grupo Financiero
059	INVEX	Banco Invex, S.A., Institución de Banca Múltiple, Invex Grupo Financiero
060	BANSI	Bansi, S.A., Institución de Banca Múltiple
062	AFIRME	Banca Afirme, S.A., Institución de Banca Múltiple
072	BANORTE	Banco Mercantil del Norte, S.A., Institución de Banca Múltiple, Grupo Financiero Banorte
102	THE ROYAL BANK	The Royal Bank of Scotland México, S.A., Institución de Banca Múltiple
103	AMERICAN EXPRESS	American Express Bank (México), S.A., Institución de Banca Múltiple
106	BAMSA	Bank of America México, S.A., Institución de Banca Múltiple, Grupo Financiero Bank of America
108	TOKYO	Bank of Tokyo-Mitsubishi UFJ (México), S.A.
110	JP MORGAN	Banco J.P. Morgan, S.A., Institución de Banca Múltiple, J.P. Morgan Grupo Financiero
112	BMONEX	Banco Monex, S.A., Institución de Banca Múltiple
113	VE POR MAS	Banco Ve Por Mas, S.A. Institución de Banca Múltiple
116	ING	ING Bank (México), S.A., Institución de Banca Múltiple, ING Grupo Financiero
124	CITI MEXICO	Banco Citi Mexico, S.A., Institución de Banca Múltiple
126	CREDIT SUISSE	Banco Credit Suisse (México), S.A. Institución de Banca Múltiple, Grupo Financiero Credit Suisse (México)
127	AZTECA	Banco Azteca, S.A. Institución de Banca Múltiple.
128	AUTOFIN	Banco Autofin México, S.A. Institución de Banca Múltiple
129	BARCLAYS	Barclays Bank México, S.A., Institución de Banca Múltiple, Grupo Financiero Barclays México
130	COMPARTAMOS	Banco Compartamos, S.A., Institución de Banca Múltiple
131	BANCO FAMSA	Banco Ahorro Famsa, S.A., Institución de Banca Múltiple
132	BMULTIVA	Banco Multiva, S.A., Institución de Banca Múltiple, Multivalores Grupo Financiero
133	ACTINVER	Banco Actinver, S.A. Institución de Banca Múltiple, Grupo Financiero Actinver
134	WAL-MART	Banco Wal-Mart de México Adelante, S.A., Institución de Banca Múltiple
135	NAFIN	Nacional Financiera, Sociedad Nacional de Crédito, Institución de Banca de Desarrollo
136	INTERBANCO	Inter Banco, S.A. Institución de Banca Múltiple
137	BANCOPPEL	BanCoppel, S.A., Institución de Banca Múltiple
138	ABC CAPITAL	ABC Capital, S.A., Institución de Banca Múltiple
139	UBS BANK	UBS Bank México, S.A., Institución de Banca Múltiple, UBS Grupo Financiero
140	CONSUBANCO	Consubanco, S.A. Institución de Banca Múltiple
141	VOLKSWAGEN	Volkswagen Bank, S.A., Institución de Banca Múltiple
143	CIBANCO	CIBanco, S.A.
145	BBASE	Banco Base, S.A., Institución de Banca Múltiple
156	SABADELL	Banco de Sabadell, S.A.
166	BANSEFI	Banco del Ahorro Nacional y Servicios Financieros, Sociedad Nacional de Crédito, Institución de Banca de Desarrollo
167	HEY BANCO	Hey Banco, S.A., Institución de Banca Múltiple, Banregio Grupo Financiero
168	HIPOTECARIA FEDERAL	Sociedad Hipotecaria Federal, Sociedad Nacional de Crédito, Institución de Banca de Desarrollo
600	MONEXCB	Monex Casa de Bolsa, S.A. de C.V. Monex Grupo Financiero
601	GBM	GBM Grupo Bursátil Mexicano, S.A. de C.V. Casa de Bolsa
602	MASARI	Masari Casa de Bolsa, S.A.
605	VALUE	Value, S.A. de C.V. Casa de Bolsa
606	ESTRUCTURADORES	Estructuradores del Mercado de Valores Casa de Bolsa, S.A. de C.V.
607	TIBER	Casa de Cambio Tiber, S.A. de C.V.
608	VECTOR	Vector Casa de Bolsa, S.A. de C.V.
610	B&B	B y B, Casa de Cambio, S.A. de C.V.
614	ACCIVAL	Acciones y Valores Banamex, S.A. de C.V., Casa de Bolsa
615	MERRILL LYNCH	Merrill Lynch México, S.A. de C.V. Casa de Bolsa
616	FINAMEX	Casa de Bolsa Finamex, S.A. de C.V.
617	VALMEX	Valores Mexicanos Casa de Bolsa, S.A. de C.V.
618	UNICA	Unica Casa de Cambio, S.A. de C.V.
619	MAPFRE	MAPFRE Tepeyac, S.A.
620	PROFUTURO	Profuturo G.N.P., S.A. de C.V., Afore
621	CB ACTINVER	Actinver Casa de Bolsa, S.A. de C.V.
622	OACTIN	OPERADORA ACTINVER, S.A. DE C.V.
623	SKANDIA	Skandia Vida, S.A. de C.V.
626	CBDEUTSCHE	Deutsche Securities, S.A. de C.V. CASA DE BOLSA
627	ZURICH	Zurich Compañía de Seguros, S.A.
628	ZURICHVI	Zurich Vida, Compañía de Seguros, S.A.
629	SU CASITA	Hipotecaria Su Casita, S.A. de C.V. SOFOM ENR
630	CB INTERCAM	Intercam Casa de Bolsa, S.A. de C.V.
631	CI BOLSA	CI Casa de Bolsa, S.A. de C.V.
632	BULLTICK CB	Bulltick Casa de Bolsa, S.A., de C.V.
633	STERLING	Sterling Casa de Cambio, S.A. de C.V.
634	FINCOMUN	Fincomún, Servicios Financieros Comunitarios, S.A. de C.V.
636	HDI SEGUROS	HDI Seguros, S.A. de C.V.
637	ORDER	Order Express Casa de Cambio, S.A. de C.V.
638	NU MEXICO	NU Mexico Financiera, S.A. de C.V., Sociedad Financiera Popular
640	CB JPMORGAN	J.P. Morgan Casa de Bolsa, S.A. de C.V. J.P. Morgan Grupo Financiero
642	REFORMA	Operadora de Recursos Reforma, S.A. de C.V., S.F.P.
646	STP	Sistema de Transferencias y Pagos STP, S.A. de C.V.SOFOM ENR
647	TELECOMM	Telecomunicaciones de México
648	EVERCORE	Evercore Casa de Bolsa, S.A. de C.V.
649	SKANDIA	Skandia Operadora de Fondos, S.A. de C.V.
651	SEGMTY	Seguros Monterrey New York Life, S.A de C.V.
652	ASEA	Solución Asea, S.A. de C.V., Sociedad Financiera Popular
653	KUSPIT	Kuspit Casa de Bolsa, S.A. de C.V.
655	SOFIEXPRESS	J.P. SOFIEXPRESS, S.A. de C.V., S.F.P.
656	UNAGRA	UNAGRA, S.A. de C.V., S.F.P.
659	OPCIONES EMPRESARIALES DEL NOROESTE	OPCIONES EMPRESARIALES DEL NORESTE, S.A. DE C.V., S.F.P.
670	LIBERTAD	Libertad Servicios Financieros, S.A. De C.V.
706	ARCUS	ARCUS F.I., S.A. de C.V., Transmisor de Dinero
901	CLS	Cls Bank International
902	INDEVAL	SD. Indeval, S.A. de C.V.
999	N/A	N/A

== City code ==
This three-digit code refers to the city ("Plaza") where the checking account is located is interna. A bank can have several Branches in a city, therefore the number of the Branch is included in the next, eleven digit section for the checking account number.

== Account number ==
The account number in the financial institution, padded on the left with zeroes to a width of 11 digits.

== Control digit ==
The control digit is calculated as the modulus 10 of 10 minus the modulus 10 of the sum of the modulus 10 of the product of the first 17 digits by its weight factor.

The first 17 digits of the CLABE are, as mentioned above, the Bank Code, the Branch Office Code and the Account Number.

The weight factor of a given digit is:

- 3 if its position (starting at 0) modulus 3 is 0
- 7 if its position modulus 3 is 1
- 1 if its position modulus 3 is 2

A 17 digit weight is always "37137137137137137".

The method is:

- For every digit, multiply it by its weight factor and take their modulus 10 (modulus is the Remainder of the integer division. The modulus X of a baseX number is its rightmost digit).
- Sum all of the calculated products, and take modulus 10 again.
- Subtract the sum to 10, take modulus 10, and you have the resulting control digit.

So, as an example:

	Bank			Branch			Account Number										
17 CLABE digits	0	3	2	1	8	0	0	0	0	1	1	8	3	5	9	7	1
	×																
Weight factors	3	7	1	3	7	1	3	7	1	3	7	1	3	7	1	3	7
	= ( % 10 )																
Products, modulus 10	0	1	2	3	6	0	0	0	0	3	7	8	9	5	9	1	7
Product sum, modulus 10	1																
10 - sum, modulus 10	9 (control digit)																

And so, the complete CLABE is: 032180000118359719

== See also ==
- International Bank Account Number
