= Vodka Villa Lobos =

Mexican vodka

Villa Lobos is a Mexican vodka which has the unique selling point that the product features the "agave worm" (the larva of the Comadia redtenbacheri moth) more commonly found in Mezcal. The marketing of this product highlights the drinks links with Tequilas and was winner of the silver medal at 'United Vodka' Tasting Competition in Brussels, 2003.

The drink is currently available as a 45% ABV spirit with the "Agave Worm" or a premium 55% ABV vodka without the "worm".

== Production ==
Villa Lobos vodka is produced by Licores Veracruz Distillers in Córdoba, Mexico (near the port of Veracruz) and is distributed by Wine & Spirit.

Their advertising slogan is Orgullosamente Mexicano! (lit. Proudly Mexican!).
