= Mexico and the World Bank =

Book about Mexico's World Bank relations

Mexico has a thriving, diverse economy with strong macroeconomic institutions and is open to trade and private investment. With a population of over 130 million, Mexico is filled with citizens in the upper middle income bracket. Its economy is the 11th fastest growing in the world. Low growth rates and significant inequalities continue to hamper the growth of the Mexican economy. This is a central issue and is addressed in the systematic country diagnostic. The World Bank Group (WBG) discussed its support for the new Country Partnership Framework (CPF) for Mexico on February 27, 2020. The CPF covers a six-year period (2020-2025) and aligns the WBG’s engagement with the government’s National Development Plan. The CPF builds on the analysis of the Systematic Country Diagnostic (SCD) and reflects the views and strategy of the authorities on the way to foster growth and poverty reduction.

Map of poverty in Mexico (%) by states in the year 2010.

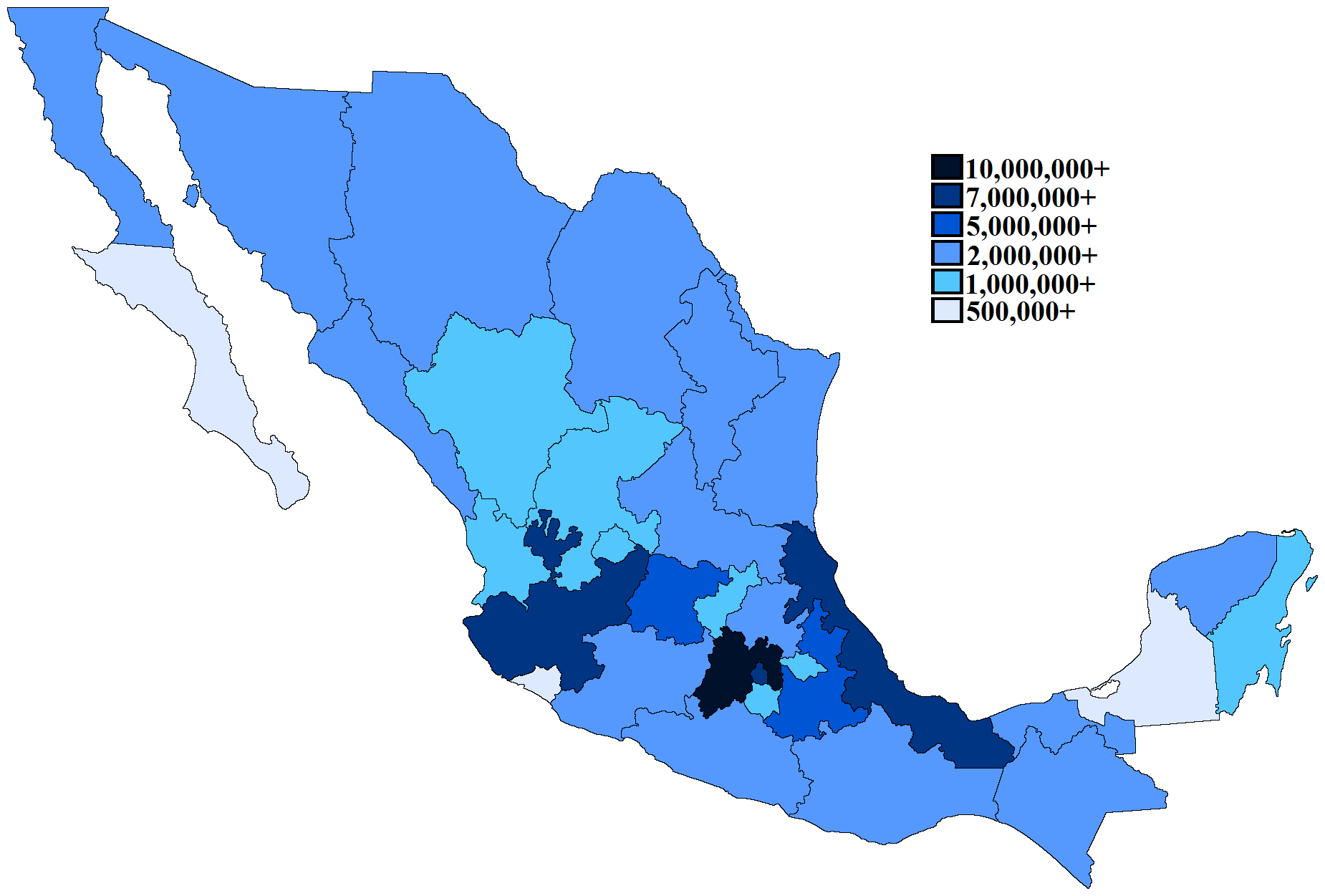
Mexico Density Map by State 2012

== Mexico ==
Mexico is an upper middle income country focused on manufacturing goods and free trade agreements with around 40-50 countries. It has 2.458 trillion dollars in GDP (purchasing power parity) making it the 15th largest economy in the world. It is a member of the OECD, NAFTA, APEC, WTO, and the G20. As of 2016, it exported goods worth around 394B dollars and imported goods worth about 369B. Its biggest trading partner is the United States, which took 74% of Mexico's exports and 49% of its imports. In Q4 2014, governmental reserves were at 131,917.0 million SDR.

== Struggles in Mexico ==
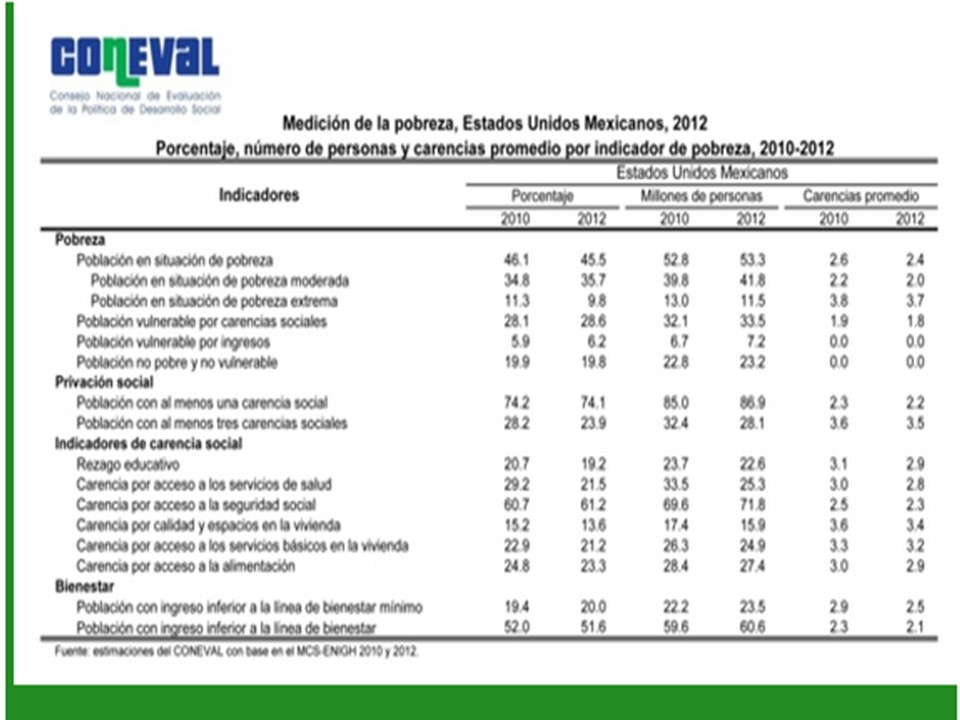
Measurement of Poverty, United Mexican States, 2012

Mexico has many problems that it is trying to deal with and it has turned to the World Bank for help. Income distribution is still unequal, there are still people within extreme poverty, and there seems to be a problem with productivity as outlined in the diagnosis of the PDP in 2013-2018. Spikes in crime also seem to be hurting Mexico's economy, specifically small business.

== World Bank projects in Mexico ==
The goals of the World Bank in Mexico are to increase productivity, inclusiveness, sustainable growth, shared prosperity, and to end extreme poverty. Currently, the World Bank has about 328 open projects worth 57,566.33 commitments (denoted in millions of dollars) mostly funded by the IBRD and are categorized by certain themes and sectors. One of these projects that is occurring in Mexico is the ISFL Program whose goal is to protect and manage forests. They also help fund the UCW Project that aims at doing research on child labor and the public policy that causes it so that they can help prevent this from occurring. Another funded project is the Proyecto Guadalajara to help promote environmental management systems to help small and medium-sized enterprises learn to stop polluting the environment. For a project that helps production and selling of grain, they helped establish the Grain Storage and Information Services for Agricultural Competitiveness. An educational project in Chihuahua called the Project for the Reduction of Inequality of Educational Opportunities had goals to stop regressive and marginal education.
