= Maria de la Cruz =

Maria de la Cruz may refer to:

- Juan dela Cruz, national personification of the Philippines in the feminized form
- María de la Cruz (1912–1995), Chilean activist
- María Victoria de la Cruz (1916–1999), Cuban-Mexican cardiologist and embryologist
- María Toto (María de la Cruz Murillo, 1945–2026), Panamanian boxing trainer and coach.
- María de la Cruz Castro Ricalde (active since 1990), Mexican writer, professor and researcher
- Maria dela Cruz (born 1993), Filipino-American soccer player
