= List of Monterrey Institute of Technology and Higher Education faculty =

This list of Monterrey Institute of Technology and Higher Education faculty includes current and former instructors and administrators of the Monterrey Institute of Technology and Higher Education, a university and high school system located in various parts of Mexico.

- Eugenio Garza Sada, founder of ITESM

== Past and present faculty ==
- Bedrich Benes – Computer science
- Ismael Aguilar Barajas – Economics
- Horacio Ahuett Garza – Mechanical engineering
- Mario Moises Alvarez – Chemistry
- José Emilio Amores – Chemistry and cultural promoter
- León Ávalos y Vez – first director of the institution
- Tamir Bar-On – Political Science
- Alberto Bustani Adem
- René Cabral Torres – Economics
- Francisco Javier Carrillo Gamboa – Knowledge systems
- María de la Luz Casas Pérez – Communications/political science
- María de la Cruz Castro Ricalde – Literature
- Susana Catalina Chacón Domínguez – International relations
- Cristóbal Cobo – communications, new technology
- Delia Elva Cruz Vega – Medicine
- Anabella del Rosario Davila Martínez – Business
- María de Lourdes Dieck-Assad – Economics, former president of EGADE Business School
- Ernesto Enkerlin – Environmental Studies
- Jurgen Faust – Design
- Dora Elvira García González – Philosophy
- Silverio García Lara – Biotechnology
- Noemi García Ramírez – Medicine
- María Teresa González-Garza y Barron – Biological sciences
- José Luis González Velarde – Mechanical engineering
- Carlos Guerrero de Lizardi – Economics/public policy
- Julio César Gutiérrez Vega – Physics
- George Haley – Marketing
- Usha Haley – International Business
- Carmen Hernández Brenes – Biotechnology
- Bryan William Husten Corregan – Business
- Jorge Ibarra Salazar – Economics
- Vyacheslav Kalashnikov Polishchuk – Mathematics
- Sergei Kanaoun Mironov – Manufacturing systems
- Blanca Guadalupe López Morales – Humanities
- José Carlos Lozano Rendón – Communications
- Ernesto Martens – Chemical engineering
- Carlos Medina Plascencia – Political science
- María Elena Meneses Rocha – Journalism
- Arturo Molina Gutiérrez – Computer science
- Isidro Morales Moreno – Political science
- Héctor Moreira Rodríguez – Administration
- Daniel Moska Arreola – Finance and administration
- Javier Gonzalez-Sanchez – Computer science, former CS program director (Guadalajara campus)
- Maria Elena Chavez-Echeagaray – Computer science, former CS program director (Guadalajara campus)
- David Muñoz Rodríguez – Electrical engineering
- Rubén Nuñez de Cáceres – Ethics, founder of the Centro de Valores Humanos
- Joaquín Esteban Osaguera Peña – Physics
- Alejandro Poiré Romero – Dean of the School of Social Sciences and Government
- Pol Popovic Karic – Literature
- Oliver Matthias Probst Oleszewski – Physics
- Rajagopal – Management)
- David Noel Ramírez Padilla – Business, former rector of the system
- Rafael Rangel Sostmann – Engineering, former rector of the system
- Marco Rito-Palomares – Biochemical Engineering
- Mireille Roccatti – Political science
- Mark B. Rosenberg – Political science/Latin American studies
- Julio E. Rubio – Mexico City Regional Dean of the School of Humanities and Education
- Olimpia Salas Martínez – Materials engineering
- José Fernández Santillán – Political science
- Arturo Santos García – Medicine
- Macario Schettino – Economics, political science
- Sergio Román Othón Serna Saldívar – Biotechnology
- Eduardo Sojo Garza-Aldape – Economics
- María Isabel Studer Noguez – International relations
- José Gerardo Tamez Peña – Bioengineering
- Carlos Manuel Urzúa Macías – Economics, former Secretary of Finance and Public Credit of Mexico.
- David Velázquez Fernández – Medicine
- Jorge Santos Welti Chanes – Biotechnology
- Adrianni Zanatta Alarcón – Mechatronics engineering
- Zidane Zeraoui El Awad – Political science
