= Olimpia Salas Martínez =

Mexican engineer

- Born: 1958 (age 67–68)
- Education: University of California, Santa Barbara
- Occupation: Materials engineer

Olimpia Salas Martínez (born 1958) is a professor and researcher at the Monterrey Institute of Technology and Higher Education, State of Mexico. Her work has been recognized with Level 2 membership in the Sistema Nacional de Investigadores of Mexico (2014).

She is a materials engineer with a doctorate in materials science and specialties in the processing of materials and the characterization of materials. She also has commercial experience in the manufacture of iron and steel products as well as in the aluminum industry.

In 2012, she was awarded a patent for a “Method and apparatus for the multi-layer and multi-component coating of thin films on substrates, and multi-layer and multi-component coatings” in conjunction with Joaquín Esteban Osaguera Peña, Alejandro Rojo Valerio, Jorge Alberto Acosta Flores, Dulce Viridiana Melo Maximo and Jorge Alvarez Diaz (#20120282478).

== Selected publications ==
- Martinez, OS (1992). A fundamental study of the formation of aluminum oxide / aluminum composites from oxidation of liquid aluminum alloys (Doctoral dissertation, University of California, Santa Barbara) (OCLC 46899933)
- Murillo, AE, Melo-Maximo, L., Garcia-Farrera, B., Martínez, OS, Melo-Máximo, DV, Oliva-Ramirez, J., ... & Oseguera, J. (2019). Development of AlN thin films for breast cancer acoustic biosensors. Journal of Materials Research and Technology, 8 (1), 350-358.
- Máximo, DVM, Davila, EOA, Vargas, OS, Martínez, OS, & Hirata, VML (2007). Numerical simulation of microstructural evolution in isothermally aged cu-ni-fe alloys. Scientia et technica, 1 (36).

== Patent applications ==
- Method and Apparatus for the Multi-Layer and Multi-Component Coating of Thin Films on Substrates, and Multi-Layer and Multi-Component Coatings, Publication number: 20160177440, (2015)
- METHOD AND APPARATUS FOR THE MULTI-LAYER AND MULTI-COMPONENT COATING OF THIN FILMS ON SUBSTRATES, AND MULTI-LAYER AND MULTI-COMPONENT COATINGS, Publication number: 20120282478, (2010)

== See also ==
List of Monterrey Institute of Technology and Higher Education faculty
