= José Fernández Santillán =

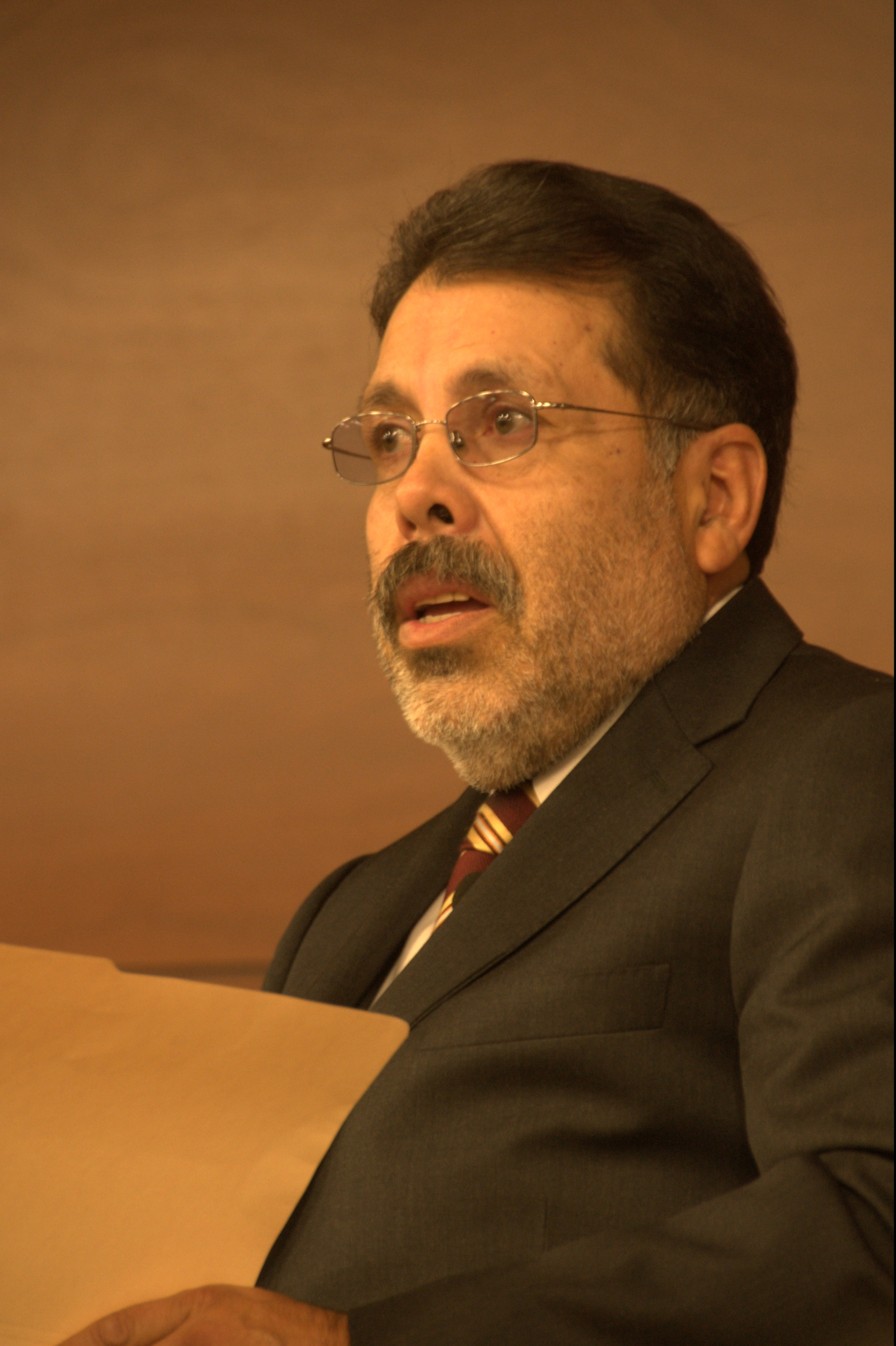
- Fernández Santillán moderating a conference at the Tec de Monterrey
- Born: May 20, 1953 (age 73); Mexico City
- Occupations: Political science professor, researcher

José Florencio Fernández Santillán (born May 20, 1953, Mexico City) is a political science professor and researcher at Monterrey Institute of Technology and Higher Education, Mexico City. He and his work appear in academic and popular media in Mexico.

== Academia ==
He received his bachelor's degree and masters in political science and public administration from the Universidad Nacional Autónoma de México (UNAM) in 1976 and 1978 respectively. His first doctorate in Political Ideas is from the University of Turin, Italy in 1983 with a second in Political Science from UNAM in 1989.

Fernández Santillán has taught and worked at various institutions. He has been a tenured professor and researcher at the Monterrey Institute of Technology and Higher Studies, Mexico City Campus (ITESM) since 2005. His teaching duties are with the campus's Department of Global Studies and he is also the director of the Center of Investigation in Humanities. He says he likes working at ITESM because of the dynamic and the teamwork both on the Mexico City campus and nationwide with the system's other campuses. He reminds his students that they are fortunate that their parents have the means to send them to ITESM and that they have a responsibility to those who have less.

In addition, he has also given courses and done research projects and fellowships with Harvard University's John F. Kennedy School of Government since 2003 as a specialist in political analysis.

His work is influenced by the Italian philosopher Norberto Bobbio, whose works he has translated into Spanish. He has spoken written about political topics, including appearances on radio and television. He believes that the rule of law is vulnerable in Mexico and the country lacks order. To counter this, he says the Mexico needs parliamentary democracy, social reforms, civil and political rights, along with the strengthening of the local municipality system and federalism among the country's 31 states, using Western Europe as an example.

== Publications ==
Fernández Santillán has published and translated numerous articles which have appeared Mexico and internationally, including all of the major Spanish speaking countries of the world. He regularly writes for El Universal and has a radio show which he anchors with Jorge Armando Rocha. In addition he has translated works by Norberto Bobbio from Italian into Spanish under titles such as El futuro de la democracia, La teoría de las formas de gobierno and Estado, gobierno y sociedad. He has also written and edited a number of books including:

- El despertar de la Sociedad Civil. Una perspectiva histórica, Editorial Océano, Mexico City, 2003.
- I dilemmi del liberal-socialismo, Nuova Italia Scientifica, Rome, 1994.
- La democracia como forma de gobierno, IFE, Cuadernos de divulgación de la cultura democrática.
- Liberalismo democrático: modelo para armar un país, Editorial Océano, Mexico City, 1997.
- Norberto Bobbio: El filósofo y la Política. Antología, Editorial Fondo de Cultura Económica, México, 1996.
- Filosofía política de la democracia, Editorial Fontamara, Mexico City, 1994.
- Locke y Kant. Ensayos de filosofía política, Editorial F.C.E., Mexico City, 1992. Prologue by Michelangelo Bovero.
- Temas sobre teoría de la administración pública, Cuaderno 2 serie: conferencias, Mexico City, 1990.
- Política y administración pública en México, INAP, Mexico City, 1989. (Reissued by UAM)
- Hobbes y Rousseau. Entre la autocracia y la democracia, Editorial F.C.E., México, 1988. Prologue by Norberto Bobbio.

== Recognitions ==
Fernández Santillán's recognitions include the Premio Universidad Nacional para Jóvenes Académicos in the area of social sciences in 1990 and the National Public Administration Institute's Prize.

He has been a member of the Sistema Nacional de Investigadores since 1986, obtaining Level III status. He is also a member of the Consejo Nacional de Ciencia y Tecnología (Level III) and a member of the Academia Mexicana de Ciencias . He has been named an electoral advisor for the Consejo General of the Instituto Federal Electoral as well as to the editorial committees of the Fondo de Cultura Económica and the journal of the Mexican Senate as well as an advisor to the magazine Este país. In 2010 he was named a visiting scholar at Harvard.

He is also visiting scholar of the Georgetown University.

== See also ==
List of Monterrey Institute of Technology and Higher Education faculty
