= María de la Luz Casas Pérez =

María de la Luz Casas Pérez was a Mexican professor and researcher in the field of communications and politics with the Monterrey Institute of Technology and Higher Studies (Tecnológico de Monterrey). Her research was recognized by the Mexican government with Level II membership in the Sistema Nacional de Investigadores.

Casas Pérez earned a bachelor's degree in communications from the Universidad Iberoamericana, a master's degree from the same from McGill University, and a doctorate in political science from the Universidad Nacional Autónoma de México, where she was awarded the Gabino Barreda medal.

For years Casas Pérez was a distinguished faculty member at the Tec de Monterrey Cuernavaca campus, where she taught in the Department of Humanities, Art and Design Department and conducted research at the Centro de Investigación en Comunicación e Información, part of the "Cátedra de Investigación en Medios de Comunicación". Her teaching and research interests include new technologies, communication, politics and media.

Outside of the Tec de Monterrey, Casas Pérez had professional experience in periodicals, book editing, film, video and appeared on various radio and television programs.

== Publications ==
Casas Pérez primarily wrote about communications and politics publishing books, book chapters, journal articles, and other works.

=== Books ===
- Medios de comunicación y libre comercio en México (2000)
- Políticas públicas de comunicación en América del Norte (2006)
- El desarrollo de competencias : el requerimiento ineludible en el siglo XXI, with José Luis Espíndola Castro (2011)

=== Recent book chapters ===
- Medios de comunicación, nuevas tecnologías y el futuro de la política in Comunicación, Política y Ciudadanía in Aportaciones actuales al estudio de la comunicación política (2011)
- Medios de comunicación y procesos de intermediación política in Comunicación Política in México: Retos y desafíos ante el proceso democratizador global (2011)
- Twitter, ¿herramienta para la expresión privada, la participación pública o la construcción de acuerdos? in La participación en redes sociales desde la teoría de la acción social in Twitter como herramienta de participación política y ciudadana (2010)
- Políticas públicas de comunicación. Un análisis y una propuesta para México in Agenda académica para una comunicación abierta (2010)
- Implicaciones políticas y sociales de la Ley Federal de Telecomunicaciones y de la Ley Federal de Radio y Televisión, para la operación de los medios dentro del marco de la región de América del Norte in La Ley Televisa y la lucha por el poder en México (2009)
- Medios de comunicación ante conflictos sociales y crisis. Los estudios de prospectiva para el análisis de los escenarios de la comunicación política in Comunicación, Medios y Crisis Económica Libro Colectivo (2009)
- Televisión para el Diálogo y la Integración Nacional in Ética e identidad cultural (2009)
- El proceso de discusión de la Ley Federal de Radio, Televisión y Telecomunicaciones en el contexto de la Teoría de la Acción Social in XV Anuario de investigación CONEICC (2008)
- Análisis e investigación de la comunicación social en México in Visiones de América. Comunicación, Mujeres e Interculturalidad (2008)
- Globalización e identidad nacional mexicana: un análisis desde la comunicación in XIV Anuario de la investigación CONEICC (2007)
- Una mirada a las pantallas. Oferta cinematográfica en México antes y después del TLC in Anuario de Investigación CONEICC XIII (2006)
- Políticas públicas de comunicación, diversidad cultural y sociedad de la información in Memorias del XVIII Encuentro AMIC (2006)

== See also ==
- List of Monterrey Institute of Technology and Higher Education faculty
