= Zidane Zeraoui El Awad =

Zidane Zeraoui El Awad is a Mexican professor and researcher of Algerian origin who specializes in international relations and the Middle East at the Monterrey Institute of Technology and Higher Education. His work has been recognized with Level II membership in Mexico’s Sistema Nacional de Investigadores.

== Life ==
Zeraoui El Awad received his bachelor's degree in journalism and information sciences from the University of Algiers in Algeria.

The professor did not come to Mexico with the intention of staying but has since become a naturalized citizen, earning his masters and doctorate in political science from the National Autonomous University of Mexico.

He is a self-described “work-a-holic,” and currently lives in Monterrey, Mexico.

== Career ==
Zeraoui El Awad is an expert in international politics, specializing in the Middle East as well as emerging players in international relations.

His academic career began at the Universidad Iberoamericana, where he coordinated the international relations undergraduate program from 1987 to 1988.

Since 1993, he has taught with the Monterrey Institute of Technology and Higher Education, primarily at the Monterrey campus. He was director of the International Relations Department from 1997 to 2003, as well as the coordinator for the Masters in Education specializing in International Relations at the Universidad TecVirtual from 1995-1997. Currently he is the coordinator of internationalization with the Division of Humanities and Social Sciences. In the 1990s he was a department director but did not like the administrative end of the position. He proposed changed to the system’s handling of personnel files, now called the ADP system.

He is one of the creators of the Program for International Business Leadership (Programa de Liderazgo Empresarial Internacional), one of the system’s signature programs, which sends students to countries in Europe, South American and Asia to complete projects.

The professor has taught over ninety course titles, all related to international relations and the Middle East, including courses at the Universidad de las América in Puebla, the National Autonomous University of Mexico, the Universidad Iberoamericana and the Universidad Femenina de México, as well as courses in French and Arabic in Algeria and Mexico.

Zeraoui El Awad has participated in over 280 conferences, courses and seminars on international relations and the Middle East.

He is one of the most recognized researchers of the Monterrey Campus, and his work has been recognized with Level 2 membership in the Sistema Nacional de Investigadores of CONACYT.

He serves on the editorial boards of the Occasional Paper of the Mexican Student Association of the University of Miami, and the Revista de Relaciones Internacionales of the Monterrey Institute of Technology and Higher Education.

== Publications ==
His book publications include: El mundo árabe: imperialismo y nacionalismo (1981); Argelia-Libia: Islam y socialismo (1986); Siria-Iraq: El Ba´th en el poder (1986); Judaísmo versus sionismo: una interpretación materialista del judaísmo norteamericano (1988); Islam y Política: los procesos políticos árabes contemporáneos (2008); México: los proyectos de su modernidad (1999); Modernidad y posmodernidad: la crisis de los valores y paradigmas (2000) and Política internacional contemporánea" (2004).

Zeraoui El Awad has also coauthored ten other titles in the field of international relations including Arab Immigration in Mexico in the Nineteenth and twentieth Centuries: Assimilation and Arab Heritage (2010), over thirty three peer-reviewed articles and over 240 articles in general newspapers and magazines, including those in Revista Tiempo, Uno más uno, El Norte and Siempre.

== See also ==
- Interview with Dr. Zeraoui at the Universidad Nacional de Rosario in Argentina, 2012
- List of Monterrey Institute of Technology and Higher Education faculty
