= Delia Elva Cruz-Vega =

Delia Elva Cruz-Vega (born 26 February 1955) is a Mexican professor and researcher at the Monterrey Institute of Technology and Higher Studies and its Centro de Innovación y Transferencia en Salud (Center for Innovation and Transference in Health). Her research work has been recognized with Level II membership in Mexico's Sistema Nacional de Investigadores.

== Personal ==
Cruz-Vega was born in Tula de Allende, Hidalgo, Mexico. Her career and research has been in Monterrey City. She started her research at the Mexican Social Security Institute, (Instituto Mexicano del Seguro Social, IMSS, its Spanish acronym) and is a professor and researcher at the Monterrey Institute of Technology and Higher Studies and its Centro de Innovación y Transferencia en Salud (Center for Innovation and Transference in Health). She has Level II membership in Mexico's Sistema Nacional de Investigadores.

== See also ==
List of Monterrey Institute of Technology and Higher Education faculty
