= Oliver Matthias Probst Oleszewski =

Oliver Matthias Probst Oleszewski is a researcher and professor specializing in wind and biodiesel technologies with the Tec de Monterrey, Campus Monterrey.

He was born in Hannover, Germany and received his bachelors (1990) and (1994) doctorate from Heidelberg University in physics and natural sciences with specialization in experimental physics respectively.

He has been a professor and researcher with the Tec de Monterrey in Monterrey since 1996, serving as physics department chair from 1999 to 2005.

His research and consultant specialties are renewable energy resources, especially biodiesel and wind, and their efficient use. He has been involved in renewable energy teaching and research since 1997, including a biodiesel project and wind energy since 2000. Wind energy projects have included assessment of existing facilities in Mexico and the United States, acting as advisor to more as well as the construction of Peñascal, a 200M” wind farm on the Texas Gulf coast. As director of the Wind Energy Research Group, he heads Tec de Monterrey’s efforts in wind turbines, and collaborates with Aeroluz, a small Mexican wind turbine manufacturer, spun off from these efforts.

Probst Oleszewski’s work has been recognized with Level II membership in the Sistema Nacional de Investigadores, and he received the Premio a la Labor Docente y Investigación (Teaching and Research Work Prize) twice. He has published thirty nine peer reviewed articles and has a ResearchGate ranking of 20.98.

== See also ==
- List of Monterrey Institute of Technology and Higher Education faculty
