= Susana Catalina Chacón Domínguez =

Susana Catalina Chacón Domínguez is a professor and researcher with the Monterrey Institute of Technology and Higher Education (Tec de Monterrey). Her work has been recognized with Level II membership in Mexico's Sistema Nacional de Investigadores as well as membership in the Club of Rome.

Chacón Domínguez received her bachelor's degree in international relations from the Universidad Iberoamericana, followed by a master's degree in public administration from Harvard University, a master's degree in economics and international studies from the Centro de Investigación y Docencia Económica (CIDE) in Mexico City and a doctorate in history from Universidad Iberoamericana. She also did post doctoral work in international relations with Georgetown University and the University of Barcelona.

In 1990, she was a research assistant at the Instituto de Estudios de los Estados Unidos, Centro de Investigación y Docencia Económicas (CIDE). Since then, she has had a number of teaching and research positions, but most of her career has been tied with the Tec de Monterrey, Santa Fe campus, where she began as a full-time researcher and professor in international relations starting in 1999. Chacón Domínguez is currently the director of research and development at the Santa Fe campus, along with her teaching duties.

Her other positions includes stints as a visiting professor and researcher in institutions such as the Instituto Matías Romero de Estudio Diplomáticos (part of the Secretaría de Relaciones Exteriores) (1999), the Rockefeller Center for Latin American Studies at Harvard (1999, 2000), the Colegio de México (2002) and Georgetown University (2004), In 2008, she worked for a time at a full-time research professor in international relations at the Universidad Iberoamericana, coordinating the bachelors in the field before returning to Tec de Monterrey. She still teaches courses there.

Her specialties include energy and sustainability in North America, Mexican foreign policy, conflict negotiation and resolution, security, and international relations theory, and has written extensively about the formulation of Mexican foreign policy and U.S.-Mexican relations as well as contributed to books on international affairs.

Chacón Domínguez has written regularly for the El Universal newspaper since 2008, and is the editor in chief of the Mexican edition of Foreign Policy magazine.

In 2002, Chacón Domínguez was admitted as a member of Mexico's Sistema Nacional de Investigadores, achieving Level II membership for her work. Since 2000, she has been the general secretary of the Mexican chapter of the Club of Rome.

== Publications ==
=== Books ===
- La Reforma Energética en México 2013: pensando el futuro (2013)

Ideas y Afanes de una patria: México en el Bicentenario (2010)

- La relación entre México y los Estados Unidos. Entre el Conflicto y la Cooperación (1940-1955) (2008)
- Un espacio, cuatro escenarios (2008)
- La Crisis del Petróleo en México, Coedición Tecnológico de Monterrey (2008)
- Negociación Diplomática: ¿Un arte olvidado? (2003)
- Entre la Globalización y la Dependencia: La política exterior de México 1994-2000 (2002)
- Energía, Narcóticos y Finanzas: La cara oculta de la política exterior de México. (2002)

=== Book chapters ===
- Canadian-Mexican Relations: ¿A feasible Future? in The Governance of Security, Risk and Sensitive Resources in a post-NAFTA North America (2011)
- Prologue in Reflexiones sobre el Fenómeno Migratorio de los Mexicanos en Estados Unidos, de Adolfo A Laborde Carranco (2010)
- México en el escenario de América del Norte: 2000-2006 in Paradigmas y Paradojas de la Política Exterior de México: 2000-2006 (2010)
- Los Esfuerzos de una Patria en el México Bicentenario: Introducción in Ideas y Afanes de una patria: México en el Bicentenario (2010)
- México y el Mundo: de aliados tradicionales a aliados estratégicos in Ideas y Afanes de una patria: México en el Bicentenario (2010)
- Hacia una agenda de la política exterior de México para el 2006-2012 in Escenarios futuros de la política exterior de México: Puntos para una reflexión (2008)
- México y los aspectos energéticos internacionales in La Crisis del Petróleo en México (2008)
- México, Estados Unidos de América y Canadá: Aspectos del Desarrollo in México: Un espacio, cuatro escenarios (2008)
- La relación petrolera México-Estados Unidos (1946-1952): Estudio de caso como fundamento para la integración energética in ¿Hacia una integración de los mercados energéticos de las Américas? (2006)
- Los Retos de la Política Exterior de México in Los nuevos desafíos de la política exterior de México en los escenarios regionales (2000)
- Entre el conflicto y la cooperación: Negociación militar, comercial y migratoria en la relación bilateral México-EEUU, (1940-1954) in Relaciones México-Estados Unidos 150 años después (1997)

== See also ==
- List of Monterrey Institute of Technology and Higher Education faculty
