= Anabella del Rosario Davila Martínez =

Anabella del Rosario Dávila Martínez is a Mexican professor and researcher at the Monterrey Institute of Technology and Higher Studies (Tec de Monterrey) as well as the director of the doctorate program in administrative sciences of the EGADE Business School on the Monterrey Campus.

== Biography ==
She was raised in the city of Monterrey and earned her bachelor's degree in psychology from the Universidad Regiomontana. With an inclination towards business, she studied her masters and doctorate in administration, from the Universidad Autónoma de Nuevo León and Pennsylvania State University in the United States respectively.

Dávila has taught courses at the Monterrey Campus for over seventeen years and is currently the director of the doctorate program in administrative sciences at the EGADE Business School there. Her work as a researcher relates to organizational culture and identity and design and structure of Latin American organizations as well as social networks and human resources. She co authored the book Cultura en Organizaciones Latinas (1999) and various chapters in other books and well as numerous academic journal articles.

Outside of the Tec of Monterrey, she has worked as a management consultant and other position related to various manufacturing industries including those in iron, steel, automobiles and trucks.

Her research work has recognized by Level II membership in Mexico’s Sistema Nacional de Investigadores, and in 2001, the Tec de Monterrey system recognized her teaching and research with its Labor Docente y de Investigación Award.

== See also ==
List of Monterrey Institute of Technology and Higher Education faculty
