= Noemi García Ramírez =

Mexican biologist and chemist

Noemi García Ramírez is a professor and researcher with the Monterrey Institute of Technology and Higher Studies, Campus Monterrey. Her research work in biology and chemistry has been recognized by Mexico's Sistema Nacional de Investigadores with Level II membership.

== See also ==
- List of Monterrey Institute of Technology and Higher Education faculty
