= Marco Rito-Palomares =

Mexican biochemist and chemical engineer (born 1966)

- Born: April 4, 1966 (age 59)
- Occupation: chemical engineering

Marco Antonio Rito Palomares (born April 1966 in Salina Cruz, Oaxaca, Mexico) is a Mexican biochemist and chemical engineer. She graduated in 1987 with a BSc in Food-Biochemical Engineering at Instituto Tecnológico de La Paz, B.C.S. In 1989, he also earned an MSc in Chemical Engineering at Tecnológico de Monterrey.

== Studies ==
Earned his PhD in chemical engineering at University of Birmingham in 1995. After working as a postdoctoral researcher in Centre for Bioprocess Engineering at University of Birmingham and University of Cambridge, he returned to Tecnológico de Monterrey as full professor of bioprocess engineering.

== Career ==
He played an important part in the foundation of the FEMSA Biotechnology Center, one of the first of its kind in Latin America. He is now the actual director. The opening of the center attended by President Felipe Calderon, who was very impressed with the lab and called the day of the event as "a day of pride for Mexico".

Then, between 2001 and 2002, he was at the University of Cambridge, also in England, where he participated in a study looking for a vaccine against cervical-uterine cancer.

== Awards ==
Marco Rito-Palomares has been honored with the Jubilee Award 2003 granted by the International Foundation for Science (IFS). Rómulo Garza Award 2002, maximum research award of Tecnológico de Monterrey.

He is member of the scientific committee of the International Foundation for Science (IFS), the prestigious Academia Mexicana de Ciencias and president of the Mexican Society of Biotechnology and Bioengineering, Nuevo León State Section.

Palomares was awarded the Award for Teaching and Research Labor by ITESM in 2007 and today is recognized as one of the most important biotechnologists in Mexico in the recovery and purification of bioproducts.

== See also ==
- List of Monterrey Institute of Technology and Higher Education faculty
