= José Emilio Amores =

- Born: March 10, 1919
- Died: June 27, 2014 (aged 95)
- Occupations: Chemistry teacher, cultural promotor in Monterrey

José Emilio Amores Cañals (March 10, 1919 – June 27, 2014) was one of the first chemistry teachers at the Monterrey Institute of Technology and Higher Education and is known for his work in promoting the arts from 1947 to the present in the city of Monterrey, Mexico. His cultural work grew out of his initial teaching job, when the director of the Palacio de Bellas Artes refused to help him bring musicians to play in Monterrey. He founded the Sociedad Artística Tecnológico, which he directed for thirty-two years, followed by stints directing several museums and other cultural institutions. He also has written poetry, essays, books and a play.

== Life ==
José Emilio Amores was born in Frontera, Tabasco; however, three months later, his family went to live permanently in Mexico City. He did his schooling there, obtaining a bachelor's degree in chemistry from the Universidad Nacional Autónoma de México.

When he arrived to Monterrey in the 1940s, he thought the city was ugly, squat and hot, but soon found things that he felt were important, respect for human life and individuality, with little violence compared to the rest of the country. He says that people there felt that the north of the country had no culture, although he disagreed with that. He stated that they were aware that they had a "culture" of working and saving, distinct from the rest of the country, but did not accept that as culture as in artistic expression.

Amores was active well into his later years. As of the late 1990s, he stated he still liked to travel in Mexico, although he could no longer do long-distance driving.

His house was filled with elements related to the arts including a piano, sculptures, paintings, books, records and videos. Two of his closest friends were Virgilioi Garza and Ramón Lamadrid, with the three calling themselves the "Los Memelos."

== Teaching career ==
Amores began his career at the Monterrey Institute of Technology and Higher Studies in 1944, become one of the first chemistry teachers at the institution. His father reading the paper found an announcement for the job as a chemistry teacher and mentioned it to his son. Amores walked fifteen city blocks to the office in Mexico City where he met the first director of the Tec de Monterrey León Ávalos y Vez. The director was impressed with his references, which included those of Manuel Sandoval Vallarta and Carlos Graef Fernández, two of the founders of modern physics in Mexico. Soon after, he was on a bus to Monterrey and worked in the first building to house the institution. In 1947, Amores became the director of the preparatory and began to teach algebra as well. He remained director of the preparatory until 1959, then was director of the engineering and architecture school from 1959 to 1966 and vice-rector of academics from 1966 to 1969.

== Career as a "cultural promoter" ==
In 1947, Amores was asked to visit the director of the Palacio de Bellas Artes, Carlos Chávez to see about having some young musicians play at the Tec de Monterrey. However, he was not well-received, with the director saying "Look, I will never waste my time in the provinces, but if someday I do, I will not work with a private institution; I will work with the government." However, the school was able to get a local business to sponsor a piano recital by Walter Hautzig, with Amores needing to find a piano. This was one of a number of performances to follow. The success of these events led to the creation of the Sociedad Artística Tecnológico, which he directed for thirty-two years.

This work led him to become a major force in the development of the arts in the city. He retired from the Tec de Monterrey in 1969 and held a number of positions in organizations such as director of the Desarrollo Social del Grupo Alfa, undersecretary of culture for Nuevo León, the director of the Museo de Monterrey (1988-1990), the director of the Centro Cultural Alfa, the director of the Museo de Historia Mexicana and the director of Radio Nuevo León (1996-1998) . Although generally known as a "cultural promoter" he does not see himself that way, just one of many in the city who does what he does. In 1998, he was paid homage by the city for his cultural work.

== As a writer ==
He began to write poetry five years after he retired from the Tec de Monterrey, and wrote essays and books as well. Many of his essays related to efforts to save green spaces in Monterrey, such as Parque Fundia, but was not always successful. His books include Los siete días de la creación (1977), Lectura de Hoy (1978) and the chapter Monterrey: Una cultura propia in Nuevo León en el Siglo XX:La Industrialización Vol II (2007). He also wrote a play called Fonda Las Ilusiones, which was first presented at the Museo El Centenario in Monterrey.
