= Héctor Moreira Rodríguez =

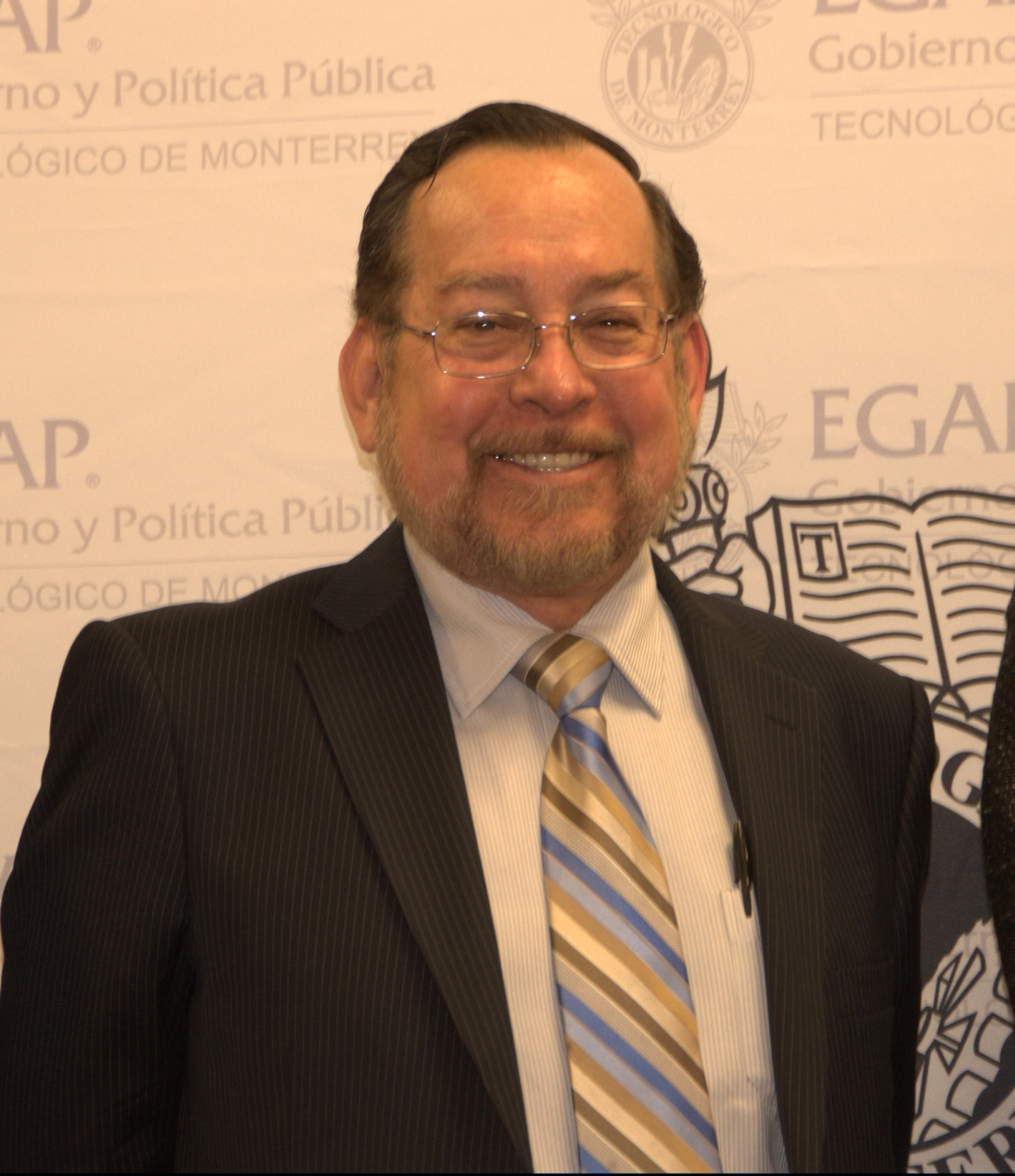
- Moreira Rodríguez at a book presentation at Monterrey Institute of Technology and Higher Education, Mexico City
- Occupations: Academic and politician
- Known for: former cabinet minister under Vicente Fox

Héctor Moreira Rodríguez was a former federal cabinet member under president Vicente Fox, a board member of PEMEX and an academic/administrator with the Monterrey Institute of Technology and Higher Studies (Tec de Monterrey) in Mexico. He died January 19, 2025 in Monterrey, Mexico.

Moreira Rodriguez is from Saltillo, Coahuila and holds bachelor's degrees in chemistry and chemical engineering (1968) from the Tec de Monterrey as well as a doctorate from Georgetown University (1972). In 1994, he received a diploma in university administration from Warwick University in England. He considers himself a researcher and academic more than a politician, specializing in energy, regional development and technological development.

At the beginning of the Vicente Fox administration, he was named coordinator of the Strategic Planning Advisors as part of the Cabinet. In 2005, he was named Undersecretary of Hydrocarbons of the Ministry of Energy, working as an advisor to then energy secretary Felipe Calderón. He also represented Mexico at meetings of OPEC in 2005 and 2006. During his tenure, PEMEX was granted autonomy in several key distribution operations, including that of gasoline. He also created the Mesoamerican Energy Integration program with nine other countries. As a former consultant for PEMEX, he defended the practice of the organization having in-house consultants which are appointed by political parties, despite friction between some of these consultants and his own party, the Partido Acción Nacional.

With PEMEX, the national oil company, Moreira Rodriguez has held post with Section 34 of the Union. Since 2009 he has been the director of PEMEX and of Pemex-Exploration and Production since 2010.

He has also been a member of the board of the Mexican Oil Institute (2004-2006, board member of the Electrical Research Institute and the Center for Research and Teaching in Economics (CIDE) (2002-2006) .

With the Tec de Monterrey system, Moreira Rodríguez has served as Advisor of the Chancellor; Vice Chancellor of Academic Development, Director of Academic Development and Director of Research.

Moreira has edited and co-author books and other publications mostly related to strategic studies. These include Nuevo León, a vision of the future and Understanding the Free Trade Agreement. He coordinated the 2001-2006 Mexican National Development Plan and Competitive Benchmarking Studies for the Mexican States (1994, 1996 and 1998). He also led the group that created the Monterrey 2020 Plan for the metropolitan area. He also written books and article on the teaching process at the Tec de Monterrey.

== See also ==
List of Monterrey Institute of Technology and Higher Education faculty
