= Rubén Nuñez de Cáceres =

Mexican philosopher, academic (1936–2022)

- Born: March 14, 1936
- Died: June 23, 2022 (aged 86); Ciudad Madero, Tamaulipas, México.
- Occupation: Ethics professor
- Known for: Founding the Centro de Valores Humanos of the Tec de Monterrey

Rubén Nuñez de Cáceres was a professor and the founder/director of the Centro de Valores Humanos (Center for Human Values) of the Tec de Monterrey, Campus Tampico.

He received his bachelor's degree in philosophy from the Pontifical Gregorian University in Italy and a bachelor's degree and master's degree in Spanish from the Comillas Pontifical University in Spain. As a professor, he taught courses in philosophy, ethics and professional values. He feels that students not only need to have access to the latest technology and knowledge but also to training to make them better professionals and human beings.

He founded the Centro de Valores Humanos after then Tec de Monterrey rector Rafael Rangel Sostmann charged him with the task of creating it as he saw fit. Núñez de Caceres thought he would spend most of his energy “selling” the idea of courses and program related to ethics and values, but has found that since the 1990s, people in Mexico have been receptive to the idea. He defines himself as a “preacher of values who goes in the world teaching what is profitable from acting in an ethical manner.”

He worked throughout Mexico, especially in the various campuses of the Tec de Monterrey. He also gave classes, seminars and conferences to businesses, government and non-governmental organizations as well as educational institutions.

He was a member of the Bioethics Committee of the Cemain Hospital of Tampico .

His first recognition was that of Best Student in 1973. In 1999, he received the Professional of the Year Award from the Rotary Club of Tampico, the Rubén Rodríguez Gutiérrez Award for his teaching career at the Tec de Monterrey in 1999 and the Mérito Candelario Garza Award in 2003 from the government of Ciudad Madero. He was named a Tamaulipeco Distinguido (Distinguished Resident of Tamaulipas) in 2004 and Maderense Distinguido (Distinguished Resident of Ciudad Madero) in 2005 by the Lion’s Club of Ciudad Madero. In 2007, he received the Family Values Award from the Church of Jesus Christ of Latter-day Saints (LDS Church). He was named Professional of the Year by the Rotary Club of Ciudad Madero in 2008 and 2011. In 2011, he received the Fray Andrés de Olmos Medal in citizenship from the city of Tampico in 2011.

He published ten books:

- Horizontes y Sueños I y II
- La Mujer y la Rosa
- Un misterio llamado amor
- Para Aprender la vida
- Antología de sueños y otras metáforas
- Educar para Vivir
- Una Conspiración Inteligente, La conducta ética una alternativa rentable
- Ética y Ciudadanía: el reto de ser, servir y trascender en la época postmoderna
- Los Privilegios y los Dones

== See also ==
- List of Monterrey Institute of Technology and Higher Education faculty
