= Dora Elvira García González =

Mexican philosopher

Dora Elvira García González is a Mexican professor and researcher at the Faculty of Philosophy of the National Autonomous University of Mexico, as well as the founder and UNESCO Chair of Ethics, Culture of Peace and Human Rights. She is currently an Emeritus Researcher of SECIHTI (Mexico's Secretariat of Science, Humanities, Technology and Innovation) and an Emeritus Professor at the Monterrey Institute of Technology and Higher Education.

== Career ==
García González received a bachelor's degree from the Universidad Iberoamericana in 1980, followed by a master's degree and a doctorate in philosophy from the National Autonomous University of Mexico (UNAM) in 1993 and 1998, respectively.

Her academic specialties focus on the philosophy of peace in relation to ethics, political philosophy, hermeneutics, and the philosophy of culture. She has taught at the undergraduate level at UNAM, Tec de Monterrey, the Autonomous University of Campeche, the University of Granada in Spain, the Universidad Iberoamericana, the Universidad del Salvador in Argentina, the National University of Comahue, and the Universidad Intercontinental in Mexico City. At the graduate level, she teaches courses on the Ethics of Peace at UNAM (since 2021) and, since 1998, has taught courses on multiculturalism, contemporary ethics, entrepreneurial philosophy, philosophical research, philosophy of the social sciences, cultural analysis, and related areas. She has also been a visiting scholar at the University of Granada, the National University of Comahue, and the University of Barcelona.

She began her teaching career at the Universidad Iberoamericana from 1980 to 1985, then served as a full-time professor and researcher at the Universidad Intercontinental from 1985 to 2003, where she created the Master's Program in Philosophy of Culture in 1996. Her research projects have included the inclusion of women in Mexico's military academies for SEDENA in 2008; coordination of the Peace and Human Rights and Justice and Human Rights Projects (2013); a multiculturalism seminar at UNAM from 2002 to 2004; a project on philosophical rhetoric in 2001 and 2002; the "Philosophy and Cultural Criticism" project with CONACYT in 2001; work with the Universidad Intercontinental from 1999 to 2004; and participation in the Círculo de Hermenéutica research group from 1995 to 2001. Her research work has been recognized by her Level III membership in the Sistema Nacional de Investigadores.

García González has also worked as a consultant and member of the Supreme Court of Justice at the Office of Jurisprudential Ethics. In 2007, she founded the journal En-claves del pensamiento and served as its Editor-in-Chief from 2007 to 2021. According to her curriculum, she also speaks English, French, and German.

== Publications ==
=== Scientific books ===
1. García-González, Dora Elvira (2019). Peace as a Moral Ideal: A Reconfiguration of the Philosophy of Peace for Common Action. Dykinson, Spain. ISBN 978-84-1324-388-7.
2. García-González, Dora Elvira (2014). Common Sense: Ethical-Political Reflections. Plaza y Valdés / UNESCO, Mexico. ISBN 978-607-402-660-3.
3. García-González, Dora Elvira (2005). From Political Power to Love of the World. Porrúa / ITESM, Mexico. ISBN 978-970-07-5463-5.
4. García-González, Dora Elvira. Analogical Hermeneutics and Society. Editorial Torres, Mexico. ISBN 978-970-9066-32-6.
5. García-González, Dora Elvira (2004). Education for Freedom and Justice: Horizons for a Citizen Ethics. ITESM CCM Readings, Mexico.
6. García-González, Dora Elvira (2004). Analogical Hermeneutics: Achievements and Perspectives. Philosophical Analogy Collection, Special Issue 14, Mexico. SIN 0188-896X.
7. García-González, Dora Elvira (2002). Liberalism Today: A Critical Reconstruction of Rawls’s Thought. Plaza y Valdés, Mexico.
8. García-González, Dora Elvira (2001). Analogical Hermeneutics, Politics and Culture. Dúcere, Mexico. ISBN 978-968-5196-02-4.
9. García-González, Dora Elvira (2001). Variations on Liberalism: An Approach to the Political Thought of John Rawls. Galileo / University of Sinaloa, Mexico. ISBN 978-968-5429-00-9.

=== Books co-authored ===
1. García-González, Dora Elvira & Camargo Castillo, Javier (eds.) (2013). Attend to the Call for Peace in a World in Flames. Ed. UASLP. (In press at the time of publication).
2. García-González, Dora Elvira & Camargo, Javier (eds.) (2020). For Peaceful Tomorrow: Philosophy of the Day Before Yesterday. Mexico: Bonilla Artigas Editores. ISBN 978-607-8636-51-8.
3. Echenberg, Margo & García-González, Dora Elvira (eds.) (2018). Rethinking Sustainability from the Humanities and Social Sciences: Definitions, Problems and Perspectives from Latin America. Mexico: Bonilla Artigas Editores, 404 pp. ISBN 978-607-98003-9-0.
4. García-González, Dora Elvira & Alcalá-Campos, R. (2015). Interculturality, Values and Valuation. UNAM Acatlán, Mexico. [2015-85389].
5. García-González, Dora Elvira & Montiel-Tiscareño, M. (2014). Peace Manual. UNESCO Chair in Ethics and Human Rights, Mexico. [2014-79080].
6. García-González, Dora Elvira & Ramírez Marín, Juan (2010). Current Problems of Mexican Environmental Law. Porrúa / TEC de Monterrey, Mexico.
7. García-González, Dora Elvira & Guerrero, Ana Luisa (2003). Analogical Hermeneutics and Gender. Dúcere, Mexico.

=== Collective books edition ===
1. García-González, Dora Elvira & Camargo Castillo, Javier (eds.). Heeding the Call for Peace in a World on Fire. Ed. UASLP.
2. Diccionario de paz: Challenge Concepts, Authors and Traditions. (One Hundred Voices). Organized for future publication (in process).
3. García, Dora Elvira & Rivas Lara, Heidi Alicia (eds.). Peace, Justice and Feminism. Ed. Porrúa.
4. García González, Dora Elvira & Camargo Castillo, Javier Alejandro (eds.). Calls for Peace: Voices and Philosophical Winks. Universidad Autónoma de San Luis Potosí, 2024. ISBN 978-607-535-393-7.
5. García-González, Dora Elvira; Soto, Laura & Trapanese, Elena (coords.). Mexico–Spain: Contributions to Theories of Justice. Multidisciplinary Conceptions. Mexico: UNAM, FES Acatlán, 2023, pp. 21–46. ISBN 978-607-30-8267-9.
6. García-González, Dora Elvira (ed.). Towards a Kind Life: Keys to the Philosophy of Peace. Porrúa; UNESCO-Unitwin, Mexico, 2018. ISBN 978-607-09-2941-0.
7. García-González, Dora Elvira (ed.). Contemporary Approaches to Peace Studies. Recrecom; CONACyT; Tecnológico de Monterrey, Mexico, 2018. ISBN 978-607-97282-5-0.
8. García-González, Dora Elvira (ed.). Reasons for Peace. Recrecom; CONACyT; Tecnológico de Monterrey, Mexico, 2017. ISBN 978-607-97282-3-6.
9. García-González, Dora Elvira & Camargo Castillo, Javier (coords.). Matrices for Peace. Bonilla y Artigas, Mexico, 2017. ISBN 978-607-8560-20-2.
10. García-González, Dora Elvira (coord.). Peacebuilding Manual: An Interdisciplinary Approach. TRANSCEND / UNESCO / RECRECOM, 2016. ISBN 978-607-7512-53-0.
11. García-González, Dora Elvira (coord.). Transcending Violence: Critique and Interdisciplinary Proposals to Build Peace. Porrúa, 2014. ISBN 978-607-09-1662-5.
12. García-González, Dora Elvira (coord.). Ethics, Person and Society. 6th ed., Porrúa. ISBN 978-970-07-7013-0.
13. García-González, Dora Elvira (coord.). Ethics, Profession and Citizenship. Porrúa. ISBN 978-970-07-7763-4.
14. García-González, Dora Elvira (coord.). Contemporary Reflections on the Philosophy of Culture: Horizontes y Encrucijadas. Porrúa / Tecnológico de Monterrey, Mexico, 2011. ISBN 978-607-09-0882-8.
15. García-González, Dora Elvira; Kohn, Carlos; Astorga, Omar (coords.). Contemporary Political Thought: Fundamental Currents. Porrúa / Universidad Central de Venezuela / Tecnológico de Monterrey / Espacio Ana Frank, Mexico, 2011. ISBN 978-607-09-0862-0.
16. García-González, Dora Elvira (coord.). Dignity and Exclusion: Theoretical and Practical Challenges of Human Rights. Porrúa, Mexico, 2010.
17. García-González, Dora Elvira; Cepeda, Ivón; Shea, Shannon (coords.). Visions of Mexico 1810–2010: Becoming of a Cultural Identity. Porrúa / UNESCO, Mexico, 2010.
18. García-González, Dora Elvira. Ethics, Profession and Citizenship: A Civic Ethics for Life. Porrúa, 2008. ISBN 978-970-07-7763-4.
19. García-González, Dora Elvira & Traslosheros, Jorge (coords.). Ethics, Person and Society: An Ethics for Life. Porrúa, 2007. ISBN 978-970-07-7013-0.
20. García-González, Dora Elvira (coord.). The Meaning of Politics: Hannah Arendt. Porrúa / Tecnológico de Monterrey, 2007.
21. García-González, Dora Elvira (coord.). Philosophy and Critique of Culture: A Reflection from Diversity. Autonomous University of the State of Mexico, February 2002.
22. García-González, Dora Elvira; Alcalá, Raúl; Velásquez Mejía, Manuel (coords.). Philosophy and Literature: Colloquium. Autonomous University of the State of Mexico, October 2000. ISBN 978-968-835-616-6.

=== Book chapters ===
1. "Frente a la violencia de género: el cuidado como elemento de construcción de paz" in Mexico. Social Vulnerability and Pandemic, Miguel Mandujano Estrada (ed.), Valencia, Tirant Editorial, Humanidades, pp. 51–67. ISBN 978-84-1183-667-8.
2. "Thinking Hope in Times of War: Peace as a Realistic Utopia" in Gabriela Palavicini, Catalina Dobre & Rafael García, Reconstruction of Peace in a World of War, Springer / Palgrave Macmillan (in press).
3. Voice entry: "Paz" in Carlos Pereda (ed.), Dictionary of Hope, Siglo XXI (in press).
4. "Lives that Promote Science, Technology and the Humanities" in Childhood at the Center: Experiences of Accompaniment and Promotion in Mexico and Latin America, UA Tlaxcala and the City University of New York (CUNY) (in press).
5. "Thinking from Care and Cure to Weave Peace in a Society Hostile to Injustice: Transcending Systemic and Epistemic Violence" in Xenia Rueda (ed.), Women's Knowledge: Facets of Epidemic Injustice in Mexico, FFyL, UNAM (in press).
6. "The World of the Image: A Hermeneutic Look" in Claudia Mosqueda & Esther Gutiérrez (eds.), The Theoretical Horizon of Design: Five Views from Hermeneutics, Semiotics and Sociology, UNAM / FES Acatlán.
7. "Towards New Political-Social Orders that Build Peace: Attending to Women's Voices, Thinking from Justice, Gender and Ecology" in Laura Soto, Miriam Somera & Paola Sánchez (eds.), Gender and Justice, UNAM.
8. "Facing Gender Violence from the Silencing of Women's Voices: A Proposal for the Foundation of Peaceful Situations" in María Teresa Muñoz (ed.), Feminist Work of the Common, Akal (in press).
9. "Thinking Hope in Times of War: Peace as a Realistic Utopia" in Catalina Elena Dobre, Gabriela Palavicini & Rafael García Pavón (eds.), Reconstruction of Peace in a World of War.
10. "Reflections on Feelings and Emotions in the Thought of John Rawls" in Jesús Rodríguez Zepeda, Gustavo Leyva, Paulette Dieterlen & Faviola Rivera (eds.), Reasons for Justice: Half a Century of A Theory of Justice, Mexico: Universidad Autónoma Metropolitana / Gedisa, 2023, pp. 149–170. ISBN 978-607-8866-42-7 (Gedisa); ISBN 978-607-28-2837-7 (UAM).
11. Dora Elvira García-González & Monserrat del Carmen González Espinoza, "Comprehensive Analysis of the Proposed Indicators for the Achievement of the Zero Hunger Goal" in Pablo Ayala, Luz N. Berrún & José C. Vázquez (comps.), Zero Hunger: Narratives and Institutional Efforts, Tecnológico de Monterrey / Universidad Autónoma de Nuevo León, 2023, ch. 10, pp. 189–205. ISBN 978-607-501-750-1; ISBN 978-607-27-2010-7.
12. Entry "Totalitarismo" in Carlos Pereda (ed.), Diccionario de Injusticias, Mexico: Siglo XXI / UNAM, 2023, pp. 735–741. ISBN 978-607-03-1315-8 (Siglo XXI); ISBN 978-607-30-6842-0 (UNAM).
13. "Public Space, Participation, Plurality and Freedom: Founding Elements of the Democratic Proposal in Hannah Arendt" in Emilio Rabasa (ed.), The Historical Defense of Democracy. Pensadores y Reflexiones, Tirant lo Blanch / IIJ-UNAM, Mexico, 2023, pp. 65–77. ISBN 978-84-1197-156-0.
14. Dora Elvira García-González & Natalia Vargas, "The Validity of the Citizen Bond: Critical Retrospective of Its Usual Meanings for the Repositioning of Republican Alternatives of the Category" in Alba Meraz & Stefano Santasilia (eds.), Perspectives on Man and Society: Between Citizenship and Globalization, UASLP / Faculty of Social Sciences and Humanities, Colección Analogon, 2023, pp. 77–105. ISBN 978-607-535-155-1.
15. "Prospective Views in Violent Times: Thinking Peace as a Moral Ideal in the Frameworks of the Imagination" in Fco. Jiménez Bautista & Tiziano Telleschi (eds.), Thinking Peace, Editorial Dykinson, Madrid, Spain, 2023, ch. 5, pp. 121–140. ISBN 978-84-1170-469-4.
16. "Towards New Political-Social Orders that Build Peace: Attending to Women's Voices, Thinking from Justice, Gender and Ecology" in Laura Soto, Miriam Somera & Paola Sánchez (eds.), Gender and Justice (in process of review), 2023.
17. "Facing Gender Violence from the Silencing of Women's Voices: A Proposal for the Foundation of Peaceful Situations" in María Teresa Muñoz (ed.), Feminist Work of the Common, Akal, 2023.
18. "Rethinking Justice within the Framework of a Social State: Reflections from Liberalism to Raise the Possibility of Peaceful Situations" in Dora Elvira García, Laura Soto & Elena Trapanese (eds.), Mexico–Spain: Contributions to Theories of Justice. Multidisciplinary Theories, UNAM, Mexico, 2023.
19. "A Theoretical and Action-Oriented Vindication of Peace" in Norman Chivasa (ed.), Global Peace and Security, IntechOpen, United Kingdom, 2022, pp. 1–20. ISBN 978-1-83768-251-5.
20. "Rupture of the Political and Normalization of Violence: Broken and Traded Bodies" in Elisabetta de Castro (coord.), Diversity, Inequality and Justice, National Autonomous University of Mexico, 2022, pp. 285–322. ISBN 978-607-30-5966-4.
21. García-González, Dora Elvira (2018). "The Cultivation of the Literary Imagination as a Resource for Ethical Learning and the Search for Peace" in Echemberg, Sánchez & Sáenz (eds.), Humanities Yet? Alternatives to Think About Ourselves from Literature and Ethics, Porrúa, Mexico, pp. 3–25.
22. García-González, Dora Elvira (2018). "To Think of Peace as a Moral Ideal from the Humanism of Erasmus and Luis Vives" in García-González (ed.), Towards a Kind Life: Keys to Philosophy, Porrúa / UNESCO-Unitwin, Mexico, pp. 3–19.
23. García-González, Dora Elvira (2018). "Underpinning Peace as a Fundamental Ethical Value and Height of Thought" in García-González (ed.), Contemporary Approaches to Peace Studies, Recrecom; CONACyT; Tecnológico de Monterrey, Mexico, pp. 7–35.
24. García-González, Dora Elvira (2017). "The Care of Eirene and the Hours: Crossroads of Peace and Gender Studies" in García-González & Camargo Castillo (coords.), Matrices for Peace, Bonilla y Artigas, Mexico, pp. 7–17.
25. García-González, Dora Elvira (2017). "Reasons for Peace in the Face of Pending Realities: Thinking with Justice and Dignity" in García-González (ed.), Reasons for Peace, Recrecom; CONACyT; Tecnológico de Monterrey, pp. 7–31.
26. García-González, Dora Elvira (2017). "The Tragedy of Eirene: Rethinking Peace from Gender Studies" in García-González & Camargo Castillo (coords.), Matrices for Peace, Bonilla y Artigas, Mexico, pp. 19–53.
27. García-González, Dora Elvira (2015). "Theoretical Assumptions for Overcoming Injustice in Contemporary Societies: Interculturality and Universality" in Los Caminos de la Interculturalidad. Homenaje a Luis Villoro, Raúl Alcalá (coord.).
28. García-González, Dora Elvira (2015). "The Principle of Good Governance in the Face of Community Projects: Approaches to the Achievement of Concord" in Ángela Sierra (ed.), Political Discourses, Identities and New Paradigms of Governance in Latin America, Laertes, Barcelona, pp. 153–172. ISBN 978-84-7584-972-0.
29. García-González, Dora Elvira (2015). "Machiavellian Controversies" in Jorge Velázquez Delgado (coord.), The Construction of the Political: Machiavelli and the Modern World, New Library / UAM, Editorial Board of Social Sciences and Humanities, Mexico, pp. 361–367.
30. García-González, Dora Elvira (2014). "Rousseauian Resonances Around Freedom and Sovereignty" in Enrique Gallegos, Rodolfo Suárez & Gabriel Pérez (eds.), Critical Considerations Embodied by Hannah Arendt, in the Footsteps of Rousseau, UAM Cuajimalpa, vol. 1.
31. García-González, Dora Elvira (2014). "Affirmative Action" in Carlos Pereda (ed.), Diccionario de Justicia, Siglo XXI.
32. García-González, Dora Elvira (2014). "Broken Bodies: Ethics and Gender Violence, Rubble Sculptures" in Antonio Sustaita (ed.), Manifestations of Art and Contemporary Culture, University of Guanajuato.
33. García-González, Dora Elvira (2014). "The Value of Peace and the Cultural Values that Guard It" in Raúl Alcalá (ed.), Interculturality, Values and Valuation, UNAM–ENEP Acatlán.
34. García-González, Dora Elvira (2013). "Crisis of the State: Between Sovereignty and the State of Exception" in Raúl Alcalá & Mónica Gómez (eds.), Redefinition of States, FES Acatlán, UNAM, vol. 1.
35. García-González, Dora Elvira (2013). "Cultural Values and Political Construction: Pending Claims Around Gender" in Raúl Alcalá (ed.), Politics and Values in Intercultural Relations, ENEP Acatlán, UNAM.
36. García-González, Dora Elvira (2013). "Thinking Hope from the Possible: Recurrent Reflections" in Eduardo Parrilla Sotomayor (ed.), The Possible Utopia: Reflections and Approaches, Tecnológico de Monterrey, vol. 1.
37. García-González, Dora Elvira (2013). "Philosophy and Contemporary Public Culture: Plural Citizens and Diverse Democracies" in Ángela Sierra & Francisco José Martínez (eds.), La filosofía ante el ocaso de la democracia representativa: pluralismo, consenso, autoritarismo, Laertes, LOGOI series, Barcelona, vol. 1. ISBN 978-84-7584-911-9.
38. García-González, Dora Elvira (2012). "Derivas de la exclusión y la violencia de género: la trata" in Ana Zagari (ed.), La filosofía latinoamericana en red, Universidad del Salvador, Argentina.
39. García-González, Dora Elvira (2012). "Key Concepts for the Construction of Politics in Giambattista Vico" in Julieta Marconi, Sergio Ortiz Leroux & Ángel Zermeño (eds.), The Vertigo of Politics: A Review from Modernity, Ed. Coyoacán.
40. García-González, Dora Elvira (2011). "Norberto Bobbio's Cosmopolitanism: In Search of a Culture of Peace from Human Rights and Justice" in Heriberto Galindo & José Fernández Santillán (eds.), Norberto Bobbio, Centenario, Ed. Fontamara. ISBN 978-607-7971-36-8.
41. García-González, Dora Elvira (2011). "Reconfiguration of the State from Policies Ordered to Development: Violations and Absences" in Alejandro Oropeza et al. (eds.), Totalitarismo, ideología y cultura, Ed. Equinoccio / Universidad Simón Bolívar, Venezuela.
42. Prologue to the book Dora Elvira García (coord.), Contemporary Reflections on the Philosophy of Culture. Horizontes y Encrucijadas, Porrúa / Tec, Mexico, 2011.
43. "Interculturality and Common Sense" in Dora Elvira García (coord.), Contemporary Reflections on the Philosophy of Culture. Horizontes y Encrucijadas, Porrúa / Tec, Mexico, 2011.
44. "Exclusion as an Ethical-Political Problem in the Processes of Cultural Homogenization: Challenges for Indigenous Minorities" in Dora Elvira García, Ivón Cepeda & Shannon Shea (coords.), Visions of Mexico 1810–2010: Becoming of a Cultural Identity, Porrúa / UNESCO, Mexico, 2010.
45. "Perverse Forms of Exclusion: Human Trafficking as a New Form of Slavery" in Dora Elvira García (coord.), Dignity and Exclusion. Theoretical and Practical Challenges of Human Rights, Porrúa / UNESCO, Mexico, 2010.
46. García-González, Dora Elvira (2009). "Semejanzas y diferencias entre la analogía beuchotiana y el 'sentido común' de G. B. Vico en relación con la diversidad cultural" in Gabriela Hernández García (coord.), Hermeneutics, Analogy and Current Philosophy, Faculty of Philosophy and Letters, UNAM, pp. 109–130.
47. García-González, Dora Elvira (2009). "Rhetoric and Discourse in the Political Thought of Hannah Arendt" in Helena Beristáin & Gerardo Ramírez Vidal (comps.), Crisis of History. Condemnation of Politics and Social Challenges, UNAM Institute of Philological Research, Mexico. ISBN 978-607-02-0566-8.
48. García-González, Dora Elvira (2009). "Responsibility, Compassion and Hope: Foundations for the Construction of Just Personal and Cultural Relationships" in María Eugenia Borsani, Elizabeth Padilla & Carlos E. Gende (comps.), Ensayos sobre filosofía, crítica y cultura, Buenos Aires, Ed. del Signo, pp. 29–43. ISBN 978-987-1074-63-1.
49. García-González, Dora Elvira (2009). "Baltazar Gracián and the Culture of Baroque Humanism" in Jorge Valdivieso & Teresa Valdivieso (eds.), The Spanish: Bulwark of Humanism. Literature, Language and Culture, Orbis Press, pp. 377–384. ISBN 978-1-931139-61-8.
50. García-González, Dora Elvira (2009). "War as a Litmus Test for the Construction of Cosmopolitanism: Peace as a Project of a Cosmopolitan Citizenship" in Raúl Alcalá & Mónica Gómez (eds.), Citizenship and Autonomy, UNAM / UACM.
51. "Civic Ethics in Professional Life" in Dora Elvira García González (ed.), Ethics, Profession and Citizenship, Porrúa, 2008.
52. "Civil Disobedience in Hannah Arendt: A Political Proposal for the Recovery of the Public Sphere and the Scope of Justice" in Dora Elvira García (coord.), The Meaning of Politics: Hannah Arendt, Porrúa / Tecnológico de Monterrey, 2007.
53. García-González, Dora Elvira (2008). "Ethics and Memory: Ethical-Political Implications of Memory. Forgiveness, a Possibility of Starting Over" in Kande Mutsaku & Edith Gutiérrez (eds.), Beyond Oblivion, Editorial Afinita / ITESM.
54. García-González, Dora Elvira (2008). "Reflections on the Concept of Death in Hannah Arendt" in Alberto Constante & Leticia Flores (eds.), Miradas sobre la muerte. Approaches from Literature, Philosophy and Psychoanalysis, Ed. Ítaca / UNAM.
55. García-González, Dora Elvira (2008). "Philosophy and Culture" in Jesús Antonio Serrano (ed.), Current Philosophy: In Latin American Perspective, National Pedagogical University / San Pablo, Bogotá.
56. García-González, Dora Elvira (2008). "Responsibility, Compassion and Hope: Foundations for the Construction of Just Personal and Cultural Relationships" in Jorge Traslosheros (ed.), The Debate for Life, Porrúa.
57. García-González, Dora Elvira (2008). "Reflections on the Ideological Content of the Constitution of 1857: The Problem of Religious Freedom" in Emiliano Rabasa (coord.), 1857–2007, Constitutional Legacy, Porrúa / Tecnológico de Monterrey.
58. García-González, Dora Elvira (2008). "Rousseauian Society as politike koininia" in Rousseau: The View of the Disciplines, Casa Juan Pablos / Autonomous University of the State of Morelos, 2008.
59. García-González, Dora Elvira (2008). "John Rawls" in Erick Ávalos (ed.), Pensadores del Siglo XX, Editorial Trillas / Universidad Michoacana San Nicolás Hidalgo, Mexico.
60. García-González, Dora Elvira (2008). "Hannah Arendt" in Erick Ávalos (ed.), Pensadores del Siglo XX, Editorial Trillas / Universidad Michoacana San Nicolás Hidalgo, Mexico.
61. "Responsibility, Compassionate Commitment and Hope: Regulative Principles for Just Intercultural Relations" in María Eugenia Borsani, Carlos Gende & Elizabeth Padilla (eds.), Diversity, a Sign of the Present, Miño y Dávila, University of Comahue, Argentina.
62. Jorge Velásquez, "On the Possibility of Thinking About Politics in Giambattista Vico from Common Sense and Prudence", UAM-I.
63. "On the Possibility of Intercultural Dialogue: Putting Oneself in the Place of the Other as an Attempt at Hermeneutical-Critical Understanding", National Autonomous University of Mexico, Faculty of Political Science.
64. "Similarities and Differences Between the Beuchotian Analogy and the 'Common Sense' of G. B. Vico in Relation to Cultural Diversity" in Gabriela Hernández García (coord.), Hermeneutics, Analogy and Current Philosophy, Faculty of Philosophy and Letters, UNAM, 2007.
65. "The Gadamerian sensus communis: A Basic Concept for Humanism. Approaches and Coincidences with G. B. Vico" in Raúl Alcalá & Jorge Armando Reyes (coords.), Gadamer and the Humanities, Faculty of Philosophy and Letters, UNAM, 2007.
66. "Reflections on Civil Disobedience in the Face of Justice and the Law from the Framework of Analogical Hermeneutics" in Dora Elvira García (coord.), Approach to Human Rights from Analogical Hermeneutics, Ed. Dúcere, 2007.
67. "On the Possibility of Building Democratic Processes and Achieving Political Education: An Invitation to Train Critical Citizens" in Enrique Dulanto (ed.).
68. "Hope and Love of the World as Regulative Principles of Human Life" in Jorge Traslosheros (ed.), Debates on Human Life, Porrúa, 2007.
69. "On the Possibility of Building Democratic Processes and Achieving Political Education: An Invitation to Form Critical Citizens", Ed. Dulanto, 2007.
70. "Ethical Dimension of Human Life" in Dora Elvira García & Jorge Traslosheros (eds.), Ethics, Person and Society, Porrúa / Tecnológico de Monterrey, 2007.
71. "Communication and Intercultural Dialogue: Articulating Analogical Hermeneutics and Thinking in the Place of the Other" in Luis Eduardo Primero Rivas & Jacob Buganza (coords.), Analogical Hermeneutics: Developments and Horizons, Primero Editores / Verbum Mentis, Philosophical Construction Collection, 2007.
72. "Rawlsian Civil Society: Resource for the Promotion of the Recognition and Cancellation of Exclusion: Civil Disobedience" in Raúl Alcalá (comp.), Recognition and Exclusion, UNAM FES Acatlán / Instituto de Cultura de Campeche, 2006.
73. "Around Human Rights: On the Possibility of Thinking About Civil Disobedience for the Attainment of Justice from the Framework of Analogical Hermeneutics" in Human Rights and Analogical Hermeneutics (in press).
74. "Common Sense: Hermeneutic-Political Category in Hannah Arendt", requested for publication, FFyL-UNAM, March 2006.
75. "Parallel Aspects Between Political Thinking and Poetic Reason: Hannah Arendt and María Zambrano", requested for publication in the colloquium Philosophy and Literature, FFyL-UNAM, March 2006.
76. "La sociedad civil rawlsiana, recurso para la promoción del reconocimiento y la anulación de la expulsión" in Raúl Alcalá Campos (comp.), Recognition and Exclusion, FES Acatlán-UNAM / Instituto de Cultura de Campeche, Mexico, 2006.
77. "The Need for Analogical Hermeneutics for the Attainment of Democracy" in Luis Eduardo Primero Rivas (coord.), Meanings and Possibilities of Analogical Hermeneutics, Primero Editores / Asociación Filosófica de México, Mexico, 2005. ISBN 978-968-5554-11-4.
78. "The Role of Civic Education in Processes of Democratic Transition: Democracy and Civic Education. A Vindicative Commitment of the Reflective and Critical Citizen" in The Role of Civic Education in Processes of Democratic Transition. Democracy and Civic Education: A Vindicative Commitment of the Reflective and Critical Citizen, Electoral Institute of the Federal District, 5th Essay Contest, November 2005, pp. 9–64. ISBN 978-970-786-008-7.
79. "On the Possibility of Thinking About Civil Society in Hannah Arendt", invited submission for a special issue on Hannah Arendt on the 30th anniversary of her death, Intersticios Magazine, Universidad Intercontinental, April 2005.
80. "Common Sense in Giambattista Vico" in Cuadernos sobre Vico, no. 17–18, 2005, Seville, Spain, ISSN 1130-7498.
81. "Interculturality as a Hermeneutical Commitment: Respect for Differences and Recognition of Plurality" in Towards a Model of Bilingual Intercultural Education in the Urban Context, CEFIA-UIC-CGIB, pp. 111–120, 2004.
82. "Thinking About Gender from the Political Philosophy of Hannah Arendt: A Hermeneutic-Analogical Interpretation" in Dora Elvira García & Ana Luisa Guerrero (eds.), Analogical Hermeneutics and Gender, Editorial Torres Asociados, Mexico City, 2005.
83. "Ethics and Culture: The Importance of Hermeneutic Rationality" in Alberto Hernández Baqueiro (ed.), Contemporary Ethics and Professional Ethics, ITESM / Patria Cultural, 2005.
84. "Philosophy and Culture" in Jesús Serrano (ed.), Current Philosophy, Ed. San Pablo, Colombia, 2005.
85. "Considerations on Gender from a Philosophical Perspective" in Ana Cristina Castillo (ed.), Women from an Interdisciplinary Approach: Problems and Regions, Tecnológico de Monterrey–Mexico City Campus, 2005.
86. "Analogical Hermeneutics and Reflective Equilibrium" in Martha Patricia Irigoyen Troconis (ed.), Hermeneutics, Analogy and Discourse, UNAM / Institute of Philological Research, 2004.
87. "A Humanistic Education for a Reflective, Critical and Plural Society" in Enrique Dulanto (ed.), The Adolescent and the School, EDAMEX, Mexico, 2004.
88. "Thinking About Gender from the Political Philosophy of Hannah Arendt: A Hermeneutic-Analogical Interpretation" in Dora Elvira García & Ana Luisa Guerrero, Analogical Hermeneutics and Gender, Ed. Torres Asociados, Mexico, 2004.
89. "Analogical and Baroque Hermeneutics: Identity, Plurality and Multiculturalism" in María Antonia González Valerio & Víctor Hugo Valdez Pérez (comps.), Analogical Hermeneutics and Cultural Plurality, Ed. Novo, Mexico, 2003, pp. 89–111.
90. "Culture and Rationality: Thinking a Hermeneutic Reason" in Philosophy and Critique of Culture. Colloquy, UAEM, 2002. ISBN 978-968-835-767-5.
91. "Analogical Hermeneutics and Reflective Equilibrium" in Javier Saldaña (ed.), Hermeneutics and Legal Analogy, Institute of Legal Research, UNAM.
92. "A Hermeneutic Reason to Think About Culture" in Dora Elvira García (coord.), Philosophy and Critique of Culture: A Reflection from Diversity, Autonomous University of the State of Mexico, February 2001.
93. "Thinking and Culture in Hannah Arendt" in Dora Elvira García, Raúl Alcalá & Manuel Velásquez Mejía (coords.), Philosophy and Literature: Colloquium, Autonomous University of the State of Mexico, October 2000. ISBN 978-968-835-616-6.
94. "Hermeneutic Metaphysics? Neither Univocalist Universalism nor Equivocist Contextualism" in Alejandro Gutiérrez (ed.), Analogical Hermeneutics: Towards a New Order of Rationality. Circle of Hermeneutics. Dialogues with Mauricio Beuchot, Plaza y Valdés / UIC, 2000. ISBN 978-968-856-815-6.
95. "Justice and Rationality" in Teresa Santiago (ed.), Insights and Limits of Rationality: In Knowledge and Society, Biblioteca Signos, UAM-I, Mexico, July 2000. ISBN 978-968-856-811-8.

=== Journal articles ===
1. "Demands and ethical demands to build peace in the framework of forced disappearances of people: an approach in spaces of marginalization and injustice" in Revista Paz y Conflictos, 2024.
2. "Peace as a value of democracy: reflections from violated societies" in Revista Cultura de Paz, Universidad de Loja / UNESCO Chair in Peace and Conflicts, 2024.
3. "An approach to rethink the voice and build peace: resistances to gender violence" Dossier: "Resignifying the Future from the Gender Paradigm" in Clepsydra. Revista de Estudios de Género y Teoría Feminista, Universidad de La Laguna, Canary Islands, Spain, 2024.
4. "Derivas del sentido de la justicia rawlsiano como recurso de apoyo para la educación para la paz" in Open Insight Journal, CISAV, vol. 15, no. 33, 2024.
5. "Prometheus in chains or the fabled university" in En-claves del pensamiento, 2024.
6. "Building peace in turbulent times: towards the defense of human rights" in Human Rights Journal, National Human Rights Commission, 2023.
7. "Social hostility and peace claims: rethinking gendered migration from some philosophical categories" in Miguel Ángel Martínez, Ana Luisa Sánchez & Francisco Díaz (eds.), Facing Violence: Histories, Public Policies, Narratives, and Emancipations in Mexico, Routledge, Taylor and Francis Group, UK, 2023.
8. "An approach to rethink the voice and build peace: resistances to gender violence" Dossier: "Resignifying the Future from the Gender Paradigm" in Clepsydra. Revista de Estudios de Género y Teoría Feminista, Universidad de La Laguna, Canary Islands, Spain, 2023.
9. "Notes for the construction of a philosophy of peace through reason and emotions: a joint proposal from Rawlsian theory and the philosophy of care" in Nordicum Mediterraneum, University of Akureyri / University of Bergen, 2023.
10. "Precarization and crisis of care in the face of violence: peace and care as an alternative for humanization" in Per la Filosofia. Filosofia e Insegnamento, Associazione Docenti Italiani di Filosofia (ADIF), ISSN 1724-059X, no. 115, year XXXIX, August 2022.
11. "Reflections from the humanities in the face of epistemic injustices: a proposal from the ethics of care and cure" in Otros Logos. Revista de Estudios Críticos, Centro de Estudios y Actualización en Pensamiento Político, Decolonialidad e Interculturalidad, Universidad del Comahue, ISSN 1853-4457, no. 13, year 12, 2022, pp. 35–55. http://www.ceapedi.com.ar/otroslogos/
12. García-González, Dora Elvira (2020). "A reasonable orientation in violent times: peace as a moral ideal" in Philosophical News, no. 21 (December 2020), pp. 67–80. DOI: 10.7413/2039-7194109.
13. García-González, Dora Elvira (2020). "Towards a hermeneutic of peace: some approaches from the Aristotelian, Ciceronian and Erasmian philosophical tradition" in Revista Araucaria: Ibero-American Journal of Philosophy, Politics, Humanities and International Relations, University of Seville, Spain.
14. García-González, Dora E. & Rueda, Xenia A. (2020). "Cancer: a perspective of human dignity and informed consent from ethics and justice" in Revista de Salud Pública, 22(3), e184536. Epub 13 July 2020. https://dx.doi.org/10.15446/rsap.v22n3.84536
15. García-González, Dora Elvira & Vargas Escobar, Natalia (2020). "Strengthening the imaginative capacity to restore the communal" in Humanistic Futures of Learning: Perspectives from UNESCO Chairs and UNITWIN Networks, Paris, UNESCO, pp. 107–115. https://unesdoc.unesco.org/ark:/48223/pf0000372577.locale=es
16. García-González, Dora Elvira & Fernández de la Reguera Ahedo, Alethia (2017). "Transcending gender violence from ethical recognition: a dialogue between philosophy and empiricism in migratory contexts" in Universum. Revista de Humanidades y Ciencias Sociales, 32, ISSN 0716-498X.
17. García-González, D. (2017). "Critical reflections on violence in Mexico from injustice: imaginatively projecting to build peace" in Eidos, no. 26. http://rcientificas.uninorte.edu.co/index.php/eidos/article/view/8146
18. García-González, D. (2017). "Dialogue and listening: a reflection to build peace" in Universidades, no. 71, January–March, pp. 7–21.
19. García-González, D. (2016). "Reflections on peace from interculturality" in Peace and Conflict Studies, vol. 23, no. 1, article 1. http://nsuworks.nova.edu/pcs/vol23/iss1/1
20. García-González, D. (2014). "A look at the construction of peace from ethical imagination" in Signos Filosóficos, no. 32, July–December.
21. García-González, D. (2014). "Violence in migrations: the case of trafficking in women" in María José Guerra Palmeiro (ed.), "Modus operandi in the forms of deception and hooking: sexual policies, equality, human rights. Debates on trafficking and prostitution" in Dilemata. International Journal of Applied Ethics, Madrid, no. 16, 2014, ISSN 1989-7022. http://www.dilemata.net/revista/index.php/dilemata/issue/current
22. García-González, D. (2014). "Looking for a culture of peace: violence and trafficking in women for sexual exploitation" in International Journal of Advances in Social Science and Humanities (IJASSH), ISSN 2347-7474.
23. García-González, D. (2013). "In search of a culture of peace in the face of violence: the case of human trafficking" in El Colegio de la Frontera Norte, vol. 51.
24. García-González, D. (2013). "Going through a culture of peace" in Luvah Journal, ISSN 2168-6319, vol. 5, pp. 110–131.
25. García-González, D. (2013). "On the reception of Hannah Arendt in Mexico. Zur Rezeption des Denken von Hannah Arendt in Mexiko – ein Literaturbericht" in HannahArendt.net, vol. 7.
26. García-González, D. (2013). "Around exclusion and violence: human trafficking. Glimpses for the attainment of peace" in Noesis, ISSN 0188-9834.
27. García-González, D. (2012). "Around the need for humanities and ethics in the university" in En-claves del pensamiento, vol. VI, pp. 45–57, with Margo Echenberg. ISSN 2594-1100.
28. García-González, D. "The responsibility of educators in current Mexico: theoretical knowledge as pillars of ethical and citizen praxis" in Apuntes Filosóficos, vol. 21, pp. 53–76. ISSN 1316-7553.
29. García-González, D. "Violence against women" in Revista Ganar Salud.
30. García-González, D. "The relevance of judicial ethics in the framework of human rights: the vindication of 'superfluous men' in the thought of Hannah Arendt", submitted to Signos Filosóficos (sent September 2011).
31. García-González, D. "Derivas de la hermenéutica del sentido común: apuestas ético-políticas", submitted to Horizontes Filosóficos, Mar del Plata (sent September 2011).
32. García-González, D. "Plurality and dialogue between cultures: challenges for an inclusive and open cultural project" in Arte Indígena y Diálogo Cultural. Cultura Indígena, 2011.
33. García-González, D. "Hannah Arendt: the validity of a thought" in Revista Enfoque, no. 13, 23 November 2010, pp. 11–30. ISSN 0718-9656 (online), ISSN 0718-0241 (print), with Carlos Kohn W.
34. García-González, D. "The task of understanding to compensate for love in the world: the Jewish and Christian heritages in Hannah Arendt" in Ser y Estar, Universidad del Salvador, Buenos Aires, Argentina.
35. García-González, D. "Hope as a criterion of possibility" in El Proyecto Feliz and online in Revista Ethos, Mexico City, September 2010.
36. García-González, D. "Overflow of moral minimums in human rights: exclusion and justice" in Dereito, Journal of the University of Sao Caetano do Sul, Brazil, 2010.
37. García-González, D. "Moral actions and judicial ethics in the thought of Hannah Arendt" in Criterio y Conducta, Institute of Jurisprudential Research and for the Promotion and Dissemination of Judicial Ethics, no. 6, July–December 2009, pp. 187–234. ISSN 1870-9516.
38. García-González, D. "Interview with Eugenio Trías: thinking about music from philosophy" in En-claves del pensamiento, vol. 1, no. 4, 2008.
39. García-González, D. "La desobediencia civil frente a la justicia" in DFensor, Human Rights Commission of the Federal District, November 2007.
40. García-González, D. "The task of renewing the world through love and action" in Revista Episteme, Venezuela, January 2008.
41. García-González, D. "Current and professional ethics: readings for global coexistence in the 21st century" in Logos, La Salle University.
42. García-González, D. "El ingenio como categoría central de la hermenéutica de Baltasar Gracián" in Estudios, 83, winter 2007, vol. V, ITAM.
43. García-González, D. "The actuality of Machiavelli", submitted to Revista Jurípolis, June 2007.
44. García-González, D. "Tikkun olam como ideal para el alcance del amor mundi arendtiano" in Daimon, Universidad de Murcia, February 2007.
45. García-González, D. "Pensar la restauración del mundo desde la perspectiva arendtiana", submitted to Revista Estudios, Buenos Aires, Argentina.
46. García-González, D. "Civil disobedience as a resource of civil society for the attainment of justice", submitted to Revista Signos, UAM-I, January–June 2006, no. 15, vol. VIII.
47. García-González, D. "On the possibility of thinking about civil society in Hannah Arendt", invited for a special issue on Hannah Arendt on the 30th anniversary of her death, Intersticios, Universidad Intercontinental, year 10, nos. 22–23, 2005.
48. García-González, D. "Zambrano y Arendt" in Revista de la Universidad, Universidad de Sinaloa, October 2005.
49. García-González, D. "Democracia y educación cívica: a vindicative commitment of the reflective and critical citizen" for the 5th Essay Contest "The Role of Civic Education in Processes of Democratic Transition", organized by the IEDF of Mexico City, May 2005 (1st prize, August 2005).
50. García-González, D. "Alcances y derivas del universalismo rawlsiano en el Derecho de gentes: a problematization of tolerance" in Revista Devenires, Faculty of Philosophy, Universidad Michoacana de San Nicolás de Hidalgo, February 2005.
51. García-González, D. "Reflections on cultural diversity in G. B. Vico" in Andamios. Revista del Colegio de Humanidades y Ciencias Sociales, Universidad Autónoma de la Ciudad de México, no. 1, 2004.
52. García-González, D. "For a transcultural justice in John Rawls: from the Theory of Justice to the Law of Peoples" in Jurípolis, Journal of the Department of Political Science and Law, ITESM CCM, year 2, vol. 2, pp. 133–152, 2004.
53. García-González, D. "Violence as a condition or as a dissolution of the political: Carl Schmitt and Hannah Arendt" in Signos Filosóficos, no. 11, 2003, pp. 73–96. ISSN 1665-1324.
54. García-González, D. "A proposal for intercultural dialogue" in Avatares, quarterly publication of the School of Philosophy, Universidad Intercontinental, year 6, no. 21, July–December 2003.
55. García-González, D. "A commitment to intercultural dialogue: putting oneself in the place of the other" in Avatares, School of Philosophy, Universidad Intercontinental, year 6, no. 21, July–December 2003.
56. García-González, D. "Rhetoric and politics: a look at the thought of Hannah Arendt" in Intersticios, semiannual publication of the School of Philosophy, Universidad Intercontinental, year 8, no. 19, January–July 2003, pp. 147–164.
57. García-González, D. "Entender a Maquiavelo" in Revista de la Universidad Autónoma de Sinaloa, no. 20, October–December 2002; no. 21, January–March 2003, pp. 55–64.
58. García-González, D. "Violence as a dissolution of the political" in Intersticios, Universidad Intercontinental, year 7, no. 16, 2002, pp. 13–34.
59. García-González, D. "La violencia y lo político" in Intersticios, Universidad Intercontinental, year 7, 2002.
60. García-González, D. "The conception of the moral person as theoretical basis of John Rawls's political liberalism" in Avatares, year 5, no. 18, July–September 2002.
61. García-González, D. "Violence as the dissolution of the political", accepted in Intersticios, School of Philosophy, Universidad Intercontinental, Mexico, 2002.
62. García-González, D. "Un liberalismo en tránsito" in Estudios, ITAM, pp. 64–65, January 2002.
63. García-González, D. "The importance of phronesis in Gadamer's thought" in Intersticios, semiannual publication of the School of Philosophy, Universidad Intercontinental, special issue, nos. 14–15, 2001.
64. García-González, D. "The analogy: between universalism and particularism. Rawls and Beuchot: the political case" in Revista de Filosofía, Universidad del Zulia, Venezuela, no. 11, 2001. ISSN 0798-1171.
65. García-González, D. "The importance of phronesis in Gadamer's thought" in Intersticios, special issue on Gadamer, year 6, nos. 14–15, 2001.
66. García-González, D. "Phronesis and reflective judgment in relation to reflective equilibrium" in Analogía. Revista de Filosofía, first part year XIV, 2000, nos. 1–2; second part year XV, 2001, no. 1. ISSN 0188-896X.
67. García-González, D. "Translatability between cultures" in Unidad y Diversidad. Revista Interdisciplinaria de Divulgación, Institute of Postgraduate Studies, Research and Continuing Education, vol. 1, July–December 2001.
68. García-González, D. "Aristotle's silent contribution to hermeneutics" in Perspectivas y Horizontes de la Hermenéutica en las Humanidades, el Arte y las Ciencias, Jornadas de Hermenéutica, Institute of Philosophical and Philological Research, UNAM, 2001. ISBN 978-968-36-9437-9.
69. García-González, D. "Philosophical debate: response to some differences of interpretation on Rawlsian liberalism" in Avatares. Cuaderno de Investigaciones en Cultura y Filosofía, Universidad Intercontinental, year 4, no. 13, April–June 2001.
70. García-González, D. "Variations around democracy: an approach to the possibility of rethinking its condition" in Unidad y Diversidad. Revista Interdisciplinaria de Divulgación, Institute of Postgraduate Studies, Research and Continuing Education, vol. 1, no. 1, January–June 2001.
71. García-González, D. "About multiculturalism: plurality, difference and exclusion" in Avatares. Cuaderno de Investigación en Cultura y Filosofía, year 3, no. 12, January–March 2001.
72. García-González, D. "The community construction of identity" in Devenires. Revista de Filosofía y Filosofía de la Cultura, Universidad Michoacana de San Nicolás de Hidalgo, Faculty of Philosophy "Samuel Ramos", year II, no. 3, January 2001.
73. García-González, D. "From metaphysical hermeneutics to political hermeneutics" in Revista Iztapalapa, UAM, no. 49, year 20, July–December 2000.
74. García-González, D. "Reconstructing Rawls?" in Revista Iztapalapa, June 2000.
75. García-González, D. "Rawlsian liberalism: an uncertain balance between social liberalism and communitarianism" in Avatares, School of Philosophy, Universidad Intercontinental, year 3, no. 9, April–June 2000.
76. García-González, D. "About liberalism", requested article for the General Directorate of Integration for an anthology for university integration courses at the UIC, March 2000.
77. García-González, D. "The silent survival of Aristotle in Gadamer" in Logos. Journal of Philosophy, La Salle University, vol. 82, January–April 2000. ISSN 0185-6375.
78. García-González, D. "Debate: neoliberalism. Some necessary clarifications" in Cuadernos Avances, Universidad Intercontinental, vol. 6, 1999.
79. García-González, D. "Variations on liberalism" in Cuadernos Avances, Universidad Intercontinental, year 2, no. 5, 1999.
80. García-González, D. "Hacia un mundo nuevo por la acción, el entender y el amor mundi" in Intersticios, Universidad Intercontinental, year 4, no. 9, 1998.
81. García-González, D. "The problem of justice in a multicultural society" in Intersticios, Universidad Intercontinental, year 4, no. 8, 1998.
82. García-González, D. "Interpretation: phronesis and reflective judgment" in La voz del texto. Polisemia e interpretación. Memoria de las Primeras Jornadas de Hermenéutica, coordinated by Mauricio Beuchot, UNAM, pp. 155–169, 1998.
83. García-González, D. "The overcoming of Rawls's formalism in favor of his politics?" in Avances, colloquium of doctoral studies in philosophy, Faculty of Philosophy and Letters, UNAM, compiled by Carmen Silva, vol. 1, pp. 54–60, 1996.
84. García-González, D. "Is Rawls's conception a utopia?" in Intersticios, semiannual publication of the School of Philosophy, Universidad Intercontinental, year 2, no. 4, pp. 61–69, 1996. ISSN 1405-4752.
85. García-González, D. "Philosophical literary reflection of the discovery of logos" in Filosofía Intercontinental desde América, vol. 1, pp. 50–58.
86. García-González, D. "Reflections on the influences of the thought of the French Revolution on culture and education in Mexico" in Revista de la Universidad Intercontinental, School of Philosophy, vol. 1, no. 2, pp. 61–77, 1990.
87. García-González, D. "Literary-philosophical reflection of the discovery of logos" in Filosofía Intercontinental desde América, School of Philosophy, Universidad Intercontinental, vol. 1, no. 1, pp. 50–58, 1990.
88. García-González, D. "Ni universalismo univocista ni contextualismo equivocista" in Intersticios, biannual publication of the School of Philosophy, Universidad Intercontinental, year 3, no. 7, pp. 69–81, 1997.

== See also ==
- List of Monterrey Institute of Technology and Higher Education faculty
