= Ismael Aguilar Barajas =

Mexican academic

Ismael Aguilar Barajas is a professor and researcher in economics and sustainable development at the Monterrey Institute of Technology and Higher Studies, Campus Monterrey (Tec de Monterrey), whose work has been recognized by the Sistema Nacional de Investigadores.

Aguilar Barajas received his bachelor's degree in civil engineering from the Universidad Michoacana de San Nicolás de Hidalgo in 1980, followed by his masters and doctorate in regional and urban planning from the London School of Economics and Political Science in 1982 and 1989 respectively.

He has been a tenured professor and researcher in economics at the Tec de Monterrey since 1991, coordinator of a research group related to economic issues on Mexico's northern border. During the 2000s, research themes have included environmental sustainability, diagnostics related to water infrastructure, water and agricultural productivity, all in Mexico as well as a study on the economic integration of the northeast of Mexico with Texas. Prior to this, he was a professor and researcher at the Colegio de México and had work and consulting experience in various private and public sector entities. He has been a visiting professor in various universities in Mexico and abroad.

Recognition for his research work include Level II membership in Mexico's Sistema Nacional de Investigadores as well as third place at the 2009 Rómulo Garza Prize for Social Science and Humanities Research. Aguilar Barajas also won three awards for his teaching of courses such as economic development and regional economics at the Tec de Monterrey system. H

The professor has represented the Tec de Monterrey system with the Consejo Consultivo del Agua y en el Programa Interinstitucional de la Región América del Norte.

== Publications ==
=== Books ===
- Integration Económica Noreste de México-Texas – Diagnóstica y Prospective (2007)
- Sustenabilidad Ambiental en la Industria: Conceptos, Tendencias Internacionales y Experiencias Mexicana (2005)
- A Diez Años del TLCAN:Reorganización Industrial (2005)
- A Diez Años del TLCAN: Reorganización Urbana (2005)
- A Diez Años del TLCAN: Reorganizatión Industrial y Social (2005)
- Industria Manufacturera de México, 1970-2005. Un Análisis de su Producto Interno Bruto por entidad Federativo y por Subsector (2004)
- Water and Sustainable Development in the Lower Rio Bravo, Mexico (2004)

=== Chapters in books ===
- Desafíos del Desarrollo Regional en México (2008)
- Panorama de la Estructura y Dinámica Económica del Noreste de México-Texas (2007)
- Conclusiones (Gobierno del Estado de Nuevo León (2007)
- Flujos de mercancías entre el estado de Texas y el noreste de México (2007)
- Du mond sans frontiers au monde forteresse (2006)
- Globalización Económica y el Papel de la Frontera en al Región América del Norte (2006)
- Agua y Desarrollo en el Noreste de México: Una Visión Panorámica (2006)
- Abasto de Agua al Area Metropolitana de Monterrey: Antecedentes, situación actual y perspectivas (2006)
- Agua y Desarrollo Económico en la Cuenca Binacional del Bajo Rio Grande/Rio Bravo (2005)
- Area Metropolitana de Monterrey:Avances y rezagos de una metrópoli mexicana de cara al XXI (2005)
- Conclusiones (El Colegio de Mpexico and Tec de Monterrey) (2005)
- Introducción (El Colegio de Mpexico and Tec de Monterrey) (2005)
- El Processo de Urbanización del Area Metropolitana de Monterrey: Algunas reflexiones de la experiencia reciente (2004)
- Privatizaciones fallidas en México: Reflexiones sobre el rescate de la banca (2004)
- Globalización Económica y el Papel de la Frontera en la Región América del Norte (2004)
- La Agenda del Desarrollo Regional en México: Retos actuales y nuevas direcciones (2004)
- Managing Border Water to the Year 2020: The Challenge for Sustainable Development (2003)
- The Role of Innovation in Regional Economic Development: Some Lessons and Experiences for Policy Making (2003)

== See also ==
- List of Monterrey Institute of Technology and Higher Education faculty
