= Blanca Guadalupe López Morales =

Blanca López de Mariscal or Blanca Guadalupe López Morales is a Professor emeritus and researcher in literature at Tecnológico de Monterrey, Campus Monterrey, Mexico.

López de Mariscal received her masters in Spanish from the Universidad Autónoma de Nuevo León in 1994, and her PhD in History from the Universidad iberoamericana, Mexico in 2002.

She is currently a Research Professor at the Tecnologico de Monterrey, Mexico, where she headed the graduate program in Humanities Studies from 2003 to 2015. Her specialties include Colonial Literature, History of Books and Reading, Travel journals and Sermons from the 16th to 18th century. López Morales also founded the Revista de Humanidades of the Tec de Monterrey, editing it from 1996 to 2006. She has also been the editor of the Boletín de la Asociación Internacional de Hispanistas.

Her latest publications include the following books: Blanca López de Mariscal and Donna Kabalen, Recovering the U.S. Hispanic Literary Heritage, Vol. IX. Arte Público Press, University of Houston, Houston Texas, ed., ISBN 978-1-55885-755-1, 2014 and Blanca López de Mariscal, La escritura y el camino. El discurso de viajeros en el Nuevo Mundo. Bonilla Artigas, editores. ISBN 978-607-8348-25-1, 2014. El Sermón como texto de cultura (2012), Editorial Idea, New York; Viaje por el Nuevo Mundo: de Guadalupe a Potosí, 1599-1605 (2010), Biblioteca Indiana de la Universidad de Navarra, Editorial Iberoamericana Vervuert; Viajes y Viajeros (2006) published by Monterrey Tec; Libros y Lectores en la Nueva España (2005); Relatos y Relaciones de viaje al Nuevo mundo en el siglo XVI (2004), published by Editorial Polifemo, Madrid; and 400 años del ingenioso Hidalgo… (2004) published by Fondo de Cultura Economica, Colombia.

In 1997, the Programa Interdisciplinario de estudios de la mujer (Colegio de México), published her book: La figura femenina en los narradores testigos de la conquista. This is an essay involving the way in which the narrators lived as women who took part in all the trascendental regarding mankind's history.

In 1995, Children's Book Press published her book The harvest Birds, a folktale from the oral tradition of Oaxaca. In the same year, this book was honored as a "Notable book" by the Smithsonian Society.

In 1993 El Colegio de México published her critical edition of: La portentosa vida de la Muerte. She prepared this work for their "Colección Biblioteca Novohispana" in which she made a deep analysis of the origins and the characteristics of Death as a topic and on its recurrence in Mexican Art, placing a special interest on Literature in the Colonial period. With this work she won the 1993 edition of the "Premio de Investigación" from the Universidad Autónoma de Nuevo León.

She has been Visiting Professor at universities such as the Pontifical Catholic University of Chile, Humboldt State University in California, University of Antwerp in Belgium, the Universität zu Köln in Germany, the University Complutense of Madrid and more recently at the University of Burgos and the Hebrew University of Jerusalem.

Her research work has been recognized with Level II membership in the Sistema Nacional de Investigadores.

== Selected publication ==
- Books
  - Blanca López de Mariscal y Guadalupe Rodríguez. "Arte de bien morir y la contienda del cuerpo y alma : un incunable toledano de 1500", Biblioteca Aurea Hispanica, Editorial Vervuert Verlagsges. Madrid, 2019, ISBN 9783964568076.
  - Blanca López de Mariscal y Nora Mariza León-Real Méndez. "Exploratrices Europeas", Editorial Bonilla Artigas Editores S.A. de C.V. México 2016, ISBN 9786078450640
  - Blanca López de Mariscal, Donna Kabalen and Paloma Vargas Montes. Print Cultures through the ages. Essays on Latin Américan Book History. Cambridge Scholars Publishing, 2016, ISBN 978-1-4438-9036-6
  - Blanca López de Mariscal and Donna Kabalen, Recovering the U.S. Hispanic Literary Heritage, Vol. IX. Arte Público Press, University of Houston, Houston Texas, editado, ISBN 978-1-55885-755-1, 2014.
  - Blanca López de Mariscal, La escritura y el camino. El discurso de viajeros en el Nuevo Mundo. Bonilla Artigas, editores. ISBN 978-607-8348-25-1, 2014.
  - Blanca López de Mariscal, Judith Farré Vidal. Viajes y viajeros / [Instituto Tecnológico y de Estudios Superiores de Monterrey], coordinación and edición,. Segunda edición, Alicante, Biblioteca Virtual Miguel de Cervantes, 2013 Notas de reproducción original: Edición digital a partir de Monterrey, Instituto Tecnológico de Monterrey, 2006. Portales: Biblioteca Americana | Instituto Tecnológico de Monterrey | Biblioteca Virtual de las Letras Mexicanas
  - Blanca López de Mariscal, Judith Farré Vidal (eds). Libros y lectores en la Nueva España, coordinación and edición. Segunda edición, Alicante, Biblioteca Virtual Miguel de Cervantes, 2013. Notas de reproducción original: Edición digital a partir de Monterrey (México), Instituto Tecnológico y de Estudios Superiores de Monterrey, 2005. Portales: Biblioteca Virtual de las Letras Mexicanas | Instituto Tecnológico de Monterrey | Biblioteca Americana
  - Blanca López de Mariscal, Judith Farré (eds.) Cuatrocientos años del ingenioso hidalgo: colección de Quijotes de la Biblioteca Cervantina / Instituto Tecnológico y de Estudios Superiores de Monterrey. Segunda edición, Publicación: Alicante: Biblioteca Virtual Miguel de Cervantes, 2013. Notas de reproducción original: Edición digital a partir de Monterrey, Cátedra Alfonso Reyes; Mexico City, Fondo de Cultura Económica; Colombia, Fondo de Cultura conómica-Filial Colombia, 2004. Portales: Biblioteca Americana Instituto Tecnológico de Monterrey | Biblioteca Virtual de las Letras Mexicanas
  - Blanca López de Mariscal and Nancy Joe Dyer (Eds.). El sermón novohispano como texto de cultura. Ocho estudios. Instituto de Estudios Auriseculares (idea), Colección "Batihoja", New York, IDEA/IGAS, 2012
  - Blanca López de Mariscal and Abraham Madroñal, Viaje por el Nuevo Mundo: De Guadalupe a Potosí (1599-1605). Madrid: Biblioteca Indiana, Universidad de Navarra, Iberoamenricana Vervuert, Tecnológico de Monterrey, 2010. ISBN 978-84-8489-505-3 and ISBN 978-3-86527-551-6.
  - Blanca López de Mariscal and Beatriz Mariscal, Actas del XV Congreso de la Asociación Internacional de Hispanistas. Fondo de Cultura Económica, El Colegio de México, AIH y Tecnológico de Monterrey, Monterrey, 2007. ISBN 978-968-16-8412-9.
  - Blanca López de Mariscal and Judith Farré, editoras. Viajes y Viajeros, Tecnológico de Monterrey, Monterrey, 2006. ISBN 968-891-107-0.
  - Blanca López de Mariscal and Judith Farré, editoras. Libros y lectores en la Nueva España, Tecnológico de Monterrey, Monterrey, 2005. ISBN 968-891-086-4.
  - Blanca López de Mariscal Relatos y relaciones de viaje al Nuevo Mundo en el siglo XVI. Editorial Polifemo, Madrid, 2004. ISBN 84-86547-69-5.
  - Blanca López de Mariscal and Judith Farré, editoras. Cuatrocientos años Del Ingenioso Hidalgo: Colección de Quijotes de la Biblioteca Cervantina y cuatro estudios. Fondo de Cultura Económica, Tecnológico de Monterrey, Colombia, 2004. ISBN 958-38-0097-X.
  - Blanca López de Mariscal, La figura femenina en los narradores testigos de la conquista. Programa interdisciplinario de Estudios de la Mujer. El Colegio de México, Consejo para la Cultura de Nuevo León, Mexico, 1997. Primera reedición, Mexico 2004. ISBN 968-12-0835-8.
  - Blanca López de Mariscal, La portentosa vida de la Muerte de Fray, Joaquín Bolaños, Edición crítica, Introducción and notas por Blanca L. de Mariscal. Biblioteca Novohispana, El Colegio de México, Mexico, 1992. ISBN 968-12-0524-3.
  - Blanca López de Mariscal, Los pájaros de la cosecha, cuento infantil. Children's Book Press, Emeryville, California, 1995.
  - Blanca López de Mariscal, coautora del libro Las aves de Chipinque, CONABIO (Comisión Nacional para el conocimiento y uso de la Biodiversidad), Monterrey, 1995. ARTicles
  - "La imprenta en la Nueva España. Un arma para la conquista espiritual" HISPANÓFILA, Department of Romance Languages, University of North Carolina, Chapel Hill, Vol. 174 – Enero de 2016, (Q3). http://romlpub.unc.edu/hispanofila-current/
  - "La transmisión de Noticias en la Nueva España". Boletín del Instituto de Investigaciones Bibliográficas UNAM, edición especial por el aniversario de la Hemeroteca Nacional. Mexico City, UNAM, 2016 http://publicaciones.iib.unam.mx/index.php/boletin/article/view/779
  - "Allí como allí y aquí como aquí. La imagen de los pobladores del reino de Chile frente a los de los llanos de Paraguay y Tucumán en el Viaje de Fray Diego de Ocaña (1599-1605)", en Hispanismos del Mundo: Diálogos y debates en (y desde) el Sur, Buenos Aires, Argentina, Miño y Dávila editores, 2016. ISBN 978-84-15295-96-9
  - "Había mucha falta de tales mujeres de Castilla". Cuadernos hispanoamericanos, Instituto de Cooperación Iberoamericana, Agencia Española de Cooperación Internacional para el Desarrollo (AECID), Madrid, Número 781-782, Julio-Agosto de 2015.ISSN 0011-250X 502-15-004-0.
  - "El Misterio de contar, apuntes de Carlos Fuentes para una teoría del cuento" en The Reptant Eagle, part four, Roberto Cantú, editor. Cambridge Scholars Publishing, 2014. ISBN 9781443870832
  - "Sobre el corpus de relatos de viaje en el septentrión Novohispano. Siglos XVI y XVII", en Recovering the U.S. Hispanic Literary Heritage, Vol. IX. Blanca López de Mariscal and Donna Kabalen (eds) Arte Público Press, Estados Unidos de América, 2014. ISBN 978-1-55885-755-1
  - "La Relación de Carlos Sigüenza y Góngora sobre la jornada a la bahía y puerto de Pensacola", Revista de Humanidades: Tecnológico de Monterrey, Número 33-34 primavera de 2013, ISSN 1405-4167.
  - "Sonetos, letanías y alabanzas en tres fiestas en honor de la Virgen de Guadalupe (1601-1602)". Hipogrifo, revista de literatura y cultura de Siglo de Oro Vol 1 - No 1 Universidad de Navarra, Grupo de investigación Siglo de oro. Instituto de estudios Auriseculares (IDEA), España: 2013
  - "Que es una línea espiral, / no un círculo la armonía: Ironía y disonancia en un romance de Sor Juana" Blanca López de Mariscal, Revista Hispanófila, Vol.168, Mayo de 2013. The University of North Carolina at Chapel Hill, N.C. 2013. (Q3)
  - "El encuentro de la cruz y la serpiente" Migraciones culturales topográficas transatlánticas. Heinrich-Heine-Universität, Düsseldorf, Iberoamericana Vervuert, Alemania: 2012
  - "Los sermones de vidas de Santos y su función ejemplar" en El sermón novohispano como texto de cultura. Ocho estudios. Blanca López de Mariscal and Nancy Joe Dyer (Eds.). Instituto de Estudios Auriseculares (idea), Colección "Batihoja", New York, IDEA/IGAS, 2012
  - "Texto e imagen en los relatos de viaje al Nuevo Mundo. La figura femenina" en Actas del XVII Congreso de la Asociación Internacional de Hispanistas: Rumbo al Hispanísmo en el umbral del Cincuentenario de la AIH, coord.. Patrizia Botta, vol VI, Hispanoamericana, Universidad de la Sapienza, Roma, 2012.
  - "Los currutacos herrados y El currutaco por alambique. Agudeza verbal y crítica social en dos textos satíricos del siglo XVIII" en Unidad y sentido de la literatura novohispana. José Pascual Buxó (editor), Mexico, Universidad Nacional Autónoma de México, 2009, pp. 445–460, ISBN 978-607-02-1067-9
  - "El currutaco por alambique de Manuel Gómez Marín. Un texto satírico del siglo XVIII" en Poesía y Satírica burlesca en la Hispanoamérica colonial. Ignacio Arellano and Antonio Lorente Medina (Eds.), Madrid, Universidad de Navarra, Iberoamericana, Vervuert, 2009, pp. 239–252, ISBN 978-84-8489-455-1
  - "A propósito del teatro doctrinal en la América hispánica. Una comedia a la Virgen de Guadalupe (1601-1602)" en Dramaturgia y Espectáculo Teatral en la Época de los Austrias. Judith Farré (Comp.), Madrid, Universidad de Navarra, Iberoamericana, Vervuert, 2009, pp. 359– 370, ISBN 978-84-8489-449-0
  - "México Tenochtitlan: la ciudad en una isla en los textos fundantes" en Realidades y fantasías, Sara Poot (Comp.), Mexico, Universidad Autónoma Metropolitana, UC-Mexicanistas (Intercampus Research Program), UC Santa Bárbara, 2009, pp. 113–126, ISBN 978-968-5055-14-7.
  - "El drama demográfico de la Nueva España en el siglo XVI: el lugar de la mujer", en Persistencia y cambio: acercamientos a la historia de las mujeres en México, Lucía Melgar (Comp.), Mexico: El Colegio de México, Programa Interdisciplinario de Estudios de la Mujer, 2008.
  - "Relatos de viaje al Nuevo mundo en el Siglo XVI: un acercamiento a la circulación de los textos" en Actas del XV Congreso de la Asociación Internacional de Hispanistas, Tomo II, Literatura española y novohispana, Beatriz Mariscal et al, editores, Mexico, Fondo de Cultura Económica, AIH, Tecnológico de Monterrey, El Colegio de México, 2007, ISBN 978-968-168-410-5.
  - "Los libros que llegaron con los Juanes. Tráfico y circulación de libros en la Nueva España en el siglo XVI", Cien años de lealtad; en honor de Luís Leal, edición de Sara Poot Herrera, Francisco A. Lomelí and María Herrera-Sobek, Mexico, University of California, Santa Bérbara, UC-Mexicanistas, UNAM, Tecnológico de Monterrey y Universidad del Claustro de Sor Juana, 2007.
  - "Mexico en 1697: Espacio cotidiano y espacio lúdico Iberoamericana". Teatro y poder en la época de Carlos II: Fiestas en torno a reyes y virreyes. España: Editorial Iberoamenricana and Tecnológico de Monterrey. 2007.
  - "Tráfico y circulación de libros en la Nueva España del siglo XVI". Cien años de lealtad; en honor de Luís Leal. Mexico City: University of California/UNAM, Tec de Monterrey and U. del Claustro de Sor Juana. 2007.
  - "Los relatos de viaje al Nuevo Mundo en el siglo XVI: Un acercamiento a las formas de circulación de los textos". Actas del XV Congreso de la Asociación Internacional de Hispanistas. Mexico City: Fondo de Cultura Económica, COLMEX and Tecnológico de Monterrey. 2007.
  - "The Discoveries of New Spain in Relation to Those of New France". Ramusio's Prologues to the Travel Narratives About the New World in the Sixteenth Century. Ottawa: U. of Ottawa and Legas. 2006.
  - "Modelos narrativos para los cronistas del Nuevo Mundo: una mirada a los textos fundantes". Permanencia y destino de la literatura novohispana. Historia y Crítica. Mexico City: UNAM. 2006.
  - En ierra Yankee, El viaje de Justo Sierra a los Estados Unidos, o el diálogo entre dos semiosferas. Mexico City: Tecnológico de Monterrey. 2006.
  - "La hazaña colombina en la historiografía italiana del siglo XVI: el caso de Ramusio". Cristóbal Colón su tiempo y sus reflejos. V Centenario de la muerte del Almirante en Valladolid. España: Instituto Interuniversitario de Iberoamerica y Universidad de Valladolid. 2006.
  - "La mujer en el drama demográfico de la Nueva España". Historia de las mujeres en América Latina. Portugal: Centro de Estudios La Mujer en la Historia de América Latina, CEMHA; Facultad de Ciencias de la Comunicaciones. 2005.
  - "Buscando oro se murio de sed: Discurso de viajeros en el siglo XVI.". En gustos se comen géneros. Mexico: Instituto de Cultura de Yucatán. 2004.

== See also ==
- List of Monterrey Institute of Technology and Higher Education faculty
