= Horacio Ahuett Garza =

Mexican engineer, professor and researcher

Horacio Ahuett Garza (born May 21, 1964) is a Mexican engineer, professor and researcher specializing in rapid prototypes, computerized processing and manufacturing and mold design. His work has been recognized with Level II membership in Mexico's Sistema Nacional de Investigadores.

Ahuett Garza earned his bachelor's in mechanical and electrical engineering from Monterrey Institute of Technology and Higher Education, Campus Monterrey (1986), during which time he also taught at the fluids laboratory. He earned his masters and doctorate in mechanical engineering from Ohio State University in 1992 and 1996, working as a researcher with the department of industrial and systems engineering and as a teaching assistant.

From 1987 to 1990 he worked with the machinery for a company named Fabricación de Máquinas as an engineer in charge of processes and new products. From 1990 to 1998, he taught mechanical engineering classes at the Monterrey campus becoming full-time in 1997, then from 1990 to 2000 was the director of the Centro de Sistemas de Manufactura del Tecnológico de Monterrey in León. During this time, he also collaborated with the Cámara de Calzado (a shoe industry promoter) in Guanajuato to develop and implement manufacturing cells in local factories.

Since 2000, Ahuett Garza has worked with the Centro de Diseña e Innovación de Productos at Campus Monterrey. His research specialties are the rapid development of prototypes, analysis of smelting techniques and the design of molds. He has also done research in computerized numerical control, computer-assisted manufacturing, analysis of aluminum smelting and injection molding. His more recent work has focused on the development of high precision machinery and microprocesses.

He has published chapters in several books including a chapter on die casting in the book Modeling for casting and solidification processing and has written various articles for journals such as Materials Processing Technology.

Ahuett Garza's work has been recognized by the Mexican government with Level II membership in the Sistema Nacional de Investigadores. In 2000 the central campuses of ITESM awarded him the "Mejor Proyecto de Apoyo al Desarrollo Sustentable" recognition. He has a patent in process for a machine designed to polish surfaces semi-automatically.

== See also ==
- List of Monterrey Institute of Technology and Higher Education faculty
