= René Cabral Torres =

René Cabral Torres is a Mexican economist who works as a professor and researcher with the Escuela de Graduados en Administración Pública y Políticas Públicas (EGAP), of the Monterrey Institute of Technology and Higher Studies (Tec de Monterrey). His work has been recognized by the Mexican government with Level II membership in the Sistema Nacional de Investigadores.

Cabral Torres holds a bachelor's degree in economics from the Tec de Monterrey, a master's degree in finance from the Tec of Monterrey as well as master's degree and doctorate in economics from the University of York. His specialties include international economics, monetary policies and macroeconomics. His research work centers on changing regimens, international commerce patterns, monetary policies and debt issues in emerging economies.

He is currently a professor and researcher with EGAP at the Monterrey Campus, and his given classes in macroeconomics in various parts of Mexico and abroad. He teaches dynamic macroeconomics at the undergraduate level and two courses at the graduate level, open economy macroeconomics and time series methods for forecasting. He has also worked as a consultant for various companies, state and federal governments as well as international agencies as part of the Centro de Estudios Estratégicos of ITESM.

He has written one book with co author Daniel Villarreal Cabello EU-Mexican, legal, commercial, and business relations. The EU-Mexico agreement: What has happened to trade and capital flows since 2000? (2010), along with journal articles in publications such as the Journal of Development Studies in the United Kingdom, the North American Journal of Economic and Finance and the Journal of Comparative Economics. His most cited work is Does Inflation Targeting Matter for Output Growth? Evidence from Industrial and Emerging Economies (2008), in Policy Research Working Paper Series and the most downloaded item is Intra-industry trade effects on Mexican manufacturing productivity before and after NAFTA (2011) in the Journal of International Trade & Economic Development.

His work has been recognized by the Mexican government with Level II membership in the Sistema Nacional de Investigadores. He also received the 2009 Premio Rómulo Garza award from the ITESM system in the area of social science and humanities for a research project entitled Effectos de la productividad en el empleo de la industria manufacturera mexicana with co-author André Varella Mollick.

== See also ==
- List of Monterrey Institute of Technology and Higher Education faculty
- "Citations". Google Scholar.
- "Most widely held works by René Cabral Torres". WorldCat.
