= José Carlos Lozano Rendón =

José-Carlos Lozano-Rendón is a researcher in the area of Latin American media studies and in the social history of cinema who has done extensive empirical research on international and political communication based on critical theoretical approaches such as political economy and cultural studies. He is the author of one of the most popular and influential textbooks in Latin American communication schools: "Mass communication theories and research", published by Pearson since 1996.

Having born and grown up in the Texas-Mexican border has also motivated him to work on issues related to media, culture and identity in this region. Lozano-Rendón is a professor and researcher at Texas A&M International University, in Laredo, Texas (United States) since 2012, and Research Fellow at the Universidad Autonoma de Nuevo León, Mexico since 2020. He was Professor of Communication from 1992 to 2012 and Research Fellow from 2012 to 2020 at the Tecnológico de Monterrey, Campus Monterrey. Since 1993 he has been a member of the National System of Researchers (SNI) of the National Council for Science and Technology (CONACYT) in Mexico, being appointed National Researcher Level 3 for the period 2018 to 2028. He was admitted as a regular member of the Mexican Academy of Sciences in 2007. He has a Ph.D. in International Communication from the University of Texas at Austin, a Master's in Mass Communication from the University of Leicester, and a BA in Social Communication from the Universidad Regiomontana.

== Publications ==
- Teoría e Investigación de la Comunicación de Masas (Textbook, Pearson)
- The Routledge Handbook to the Culture and Media of the Americas (co-editor)
- La Comunicación en México: Diagnósticos, Balances y Retos (Editor)
- Global Media Journal México (Electronic Academic Journal; co-editor)
- Exhibiting films in a predominantly Mexican American market: the case of Laredo, Texas, a small USA-Mexico border town, 1896-1960
- The social experience of going to the movies in the 1930s-1960s in a small Texas border town
- Naïve and sophisticated long-term readings of foreign and national films viewed in a Mexican northern town during the 1930-60s
- Film at the border: Memories of cinema going in Laredo, Texas
- La experiencia social histórica de asistencia al cine en Monterrey (Nuevo León, México) durante las décadas de 1930 a 1960
- Images of Donald Trump and the United States on the Mexican Press
- Consumo y apropiación de cine y TV extranjeros por audiencias en América Latina
- Distanciamiento crítico frente a la televisión nacional mexicana
- Parroquianos, cosmopolitas, exploradores y colonos: la recomposición de las audiencias en tiempos de pantallas múltiples
- Critical concerns and commercial interests: The historical development and incipient consolidation of communication research in Mexico
- Transnational Forces, Technological developments, and the role of the state in the Mexican audiovisual sectorMedia reception on the Mexican border with the United States
- Public policies and research on cultural diversity and television in Mexico

== Research projects ==
Lozano Rendón has published more than fifty articles in peer-reviewed academic journals and multiple chapters in edited books, both in English and in Spanish. Since 2012 he has acted as Principal Investigator and Coordinator of the International Project "Screen Culture: Exhibition, Programming and Cinemagoing in Latin America and Spain" together with Belgian researchers Daniel Biltereyst (Ghent University) and Philippe Meers (University of Antwerp). Teams of researchers participate in this network in seven Mexican cities (Mexico City, León, Monterrey, Saltillo, Tampico, Torreón, Veracruz), a city on the United States border with Mexico (Laredo, Texas), two Colombian cities (Cartagena and Cali), a Cuban city (Santiago) and a Spanish one (Barcelona).

== Service in professional associations ==
Lozano Rendón has been member of the Executive Committees of the Latin American Association of Communication Researchers (ALAIC), the National Council for Teaching and Research in Communication Sciences (CONEICC), and the Latin American Federation of Social Communication Faculties (FELAFACS). In 1999 he obtained the Televisa Chair and in 2003 an Internal Research Chair of the Tecnológico de Monterrey, which financed his research efforts until 2012.

== See also ==
List of Monterrey Institute of Technology and Higher Education faculty
