= Carmen Hernández Brenes =

Mexican professor and researcher

Carmen Hernández Brenes is a Mexican professor and researcher at the Monterrey Institute of Technology and Higher Education, Campus Monterrey (Tec de Monterrey). Her work has been recognized with Level II membership in Mexico's Sistema Nacional de Investigadores.

Hernandez Brenes earned her bachelor's degree in food engineering at the Tec de Monterrey in 1994, then a master's degree from Texas A&M University in 1996. She started her doctorate at the same university but moved to the University of Arkansas, but completed training in HACCP procedures at Texas A&M.

In 1993, she worked as an intern at Valley View Packing Company in San Jose, California, working with apricot and prune juice concentrates and dried fruit snacks. Hernández Brenes was a professor and researcher at the University of Wisconsin-Madison, specializing in food processing, beginning in 2000.

== See also ==
- List of Monterrey Institute of Technology and Higher Education faculty
