= María Teresa González-Garza y Barron =

Mexican biotechnologist

- Born: July 3, 1946; Mexico City
- Died: 2021 (aged 74–75)
- Education: La Universidad Nacional Autónoma de México (UNAM) La Universidad Autónoma de Nuevo León (UANL)
- Scientific career
- Fields: Biology, Microbiology
- Workplaces: el Centro de Investigación Biomédica del Noreste (IMSS) el Instituto Tecnológico y de Estudios Superiores de Monterrey (ITESM)

Maria Teresa González Garza y Barrón was a professor and researcher in biotechnology at Monterrey Institute of Technology and Higher Education, Monterrey Campus.

After completing a university degree in biology, from the National Autonomous University of Mexico (UNAM) in 1969, she spent 15 years at the university and within the Mexican Social Security Institute in a Department of Biomedical Research. In 1992, she received her doctorate in biology with a specialty in microbiology from the Autonomous University of Nuevo León.

Her specialties included cellular biology, molecular biology, cell therapy and ethnobiology. In particular, her research focused on cellular mechanisms in cancer lines, differences between normal and cancerous cells, and the use of cell therapies using stem cells to replace damaged tissue. She also investigated natural substances from traditional medicine for their potential anticancer and antiparasitic properties.

Throughout her career, she worked with el Centro de Investigación Biomédica del Noreste (IMSS) and el Instituto Tecnológico y de Estudios Superiores de Monterrey (ITESM) and the Centro de Innovación y Transferencia en Salud and the Cátedra de Terapia Celular. She was part of a team which has had success in combating amyotrophic lateral sclerosis with stem cell therapy.

Her research work has been recognized by Mexico's Sistema Nacional de Investigadores with Level II membership. She has received various awards including the Dr. Jorge Rosenkranz Medical Research Award (1988) and the Canifarma Award (1993).

== See also ==
- List of Monterrey Institute of Technology and Higher Education faculty
