= Carlos Guerrero de Lizardi =

Mexican economist

Carlos Guerrero de Lizardi is a Mexican professor and researcher in economics with the Monterrey Institute of Technology and Higher Education, currently the director of the master's program in economics and public policy at the Mexico City campus. His work has been recognized with Level II membership in Mexico's Sistema Nacional de Investigadores.

Guerrero de Lizardi has a bachelor's and master's in economics from the Universidad Nacional Autónoma de México and a doctorate in applied economics from the Universidad Autónoma de Madrid.

Research and teaching specialties include time series analysis, economic and macroeconomic theory, and price indices, with over twenty-six articles published in peer-reviewed journals. He has also been a consultant with CEPAL and a researcher at the Universidad Anáhuac del Sur and the Universidad de La Coruña.

== Publications ==
=== Books ===
- (2009) Guerrero de Lizardi, Carlos. Nuevas mediciones de la inflación y el crecimiento económico en México. Miguel Ángel Porrúa — Tecnológico de Monterrey. Mexico City.
- (2008) Guerrero de Lizardi, Carlos. Introducción a la econometría aplicada. Trillas. Mexico City.

=== Book chapters ===
- (2007) Urzúa Macías, Carlos Manuel; Guerrero de Lizardi, Carlos. Macroeconomía del crecimiento sostenido: Agenda para el desarrollo, Vol. 4. Reflexiones sobre la política cambiaria en México. UNAM-Miguel Ángel Porrúa. Mexico City. Calva, J. L. pp. 155-168.
- (2006) García Alba Iduñate, Pascual; Guerrero De Lizardi, Carlos. Políticas Públicas para el crecimiento y la consolidación democrática 2006–2012. Hacia una política para recuperar el crecimiento a través del empleo y sin inflación. Tecnológico de Monterrey. Mexico City. Bernardo González Aréchiga. pp 43-54.

=== Journal articles ===
- (2011) Guerrero de Lizardi, Carlos "Pitfalls in the analysis of complex surveys using Stata," Mexican Stata Users' Group Meetings 2011 06, Stata Users Group.
- (2010) Guerrero de Lizardi, Carlos. Alternative consumer price indexes for Mexico—Center for International Development Working Papers. United States. pp 1- 13.
- (2009) Guerrero de Lizardi, Carlos. Contribution of the information and communication technology sector to Mexican economic growth from 1999 to 2003. Econoquantum. Mexico City. pp 11-30.
- (2008) Guerrero de Lizardi, Carlos. Sesgo de medición del PIB derivado de los cambios en la calidad del sector de TI: México 2000–2004. Estudios económicos. pp 553-580.
- (2008) Guerrero de Lizardi, Carlos. Sesgos de medición del Índice Nacional de Precios al Consumidor 2002–2007. Investigación económica. Mexico City. pp 37-66.
- (2007) Guerrero de Lizardi, Carlos. Determinantes del crecimiento económico: el caso de México 1986–2003. Problemas del desarrollo. Revista latinoamericana de economía. Mexico City. pp 153-171.
- (2007) Guerrero de Lizardi, Carlos. El sesgo por calidad del índice nacional de precios al consumidor. Comercio exterior. Mexico City. pp 924-930.
- (2006) Guerrero de Lizardi, Carlos. Determinantes del crecimiento económico en México 1929–2003: una perspectiva postkeynesiana. Investigación económica. Mexico City. pp 127-158.
- (2006) Guerrero de Lizardi, Carlos. Thirwall´s law with an emphasis on the ratio of exports/imports income elasticities in Latin American economies during the twentieth century. Estudios económicos. Mexico City. pp 23-44.
- (2006) Guerrero de Lizardi, Carlos. Una aproximación al sesgo de medición del precio de las computadoras personales en México. Economía mexicana (Nueva época). Mexico City. pp 97-124.
- (2006) Guerrero de Lizardi, Carlos; Osorio, Paulina; Tiol, Adriana. Exploración de la asociación entre la tasa de crecimiento de los salarios reales y la tasa de desempleo en México, 1895–2004. Panorama económico. Mexico City. pp: 101-125.

== See also ==
- List of Monterrey Institute of Technology and Higher Education faculty
- "Most widely held works by Carlos Guerrero de Lizardi". WorldCat.
