= Macario Schettino =

Mexican economist and political analyst

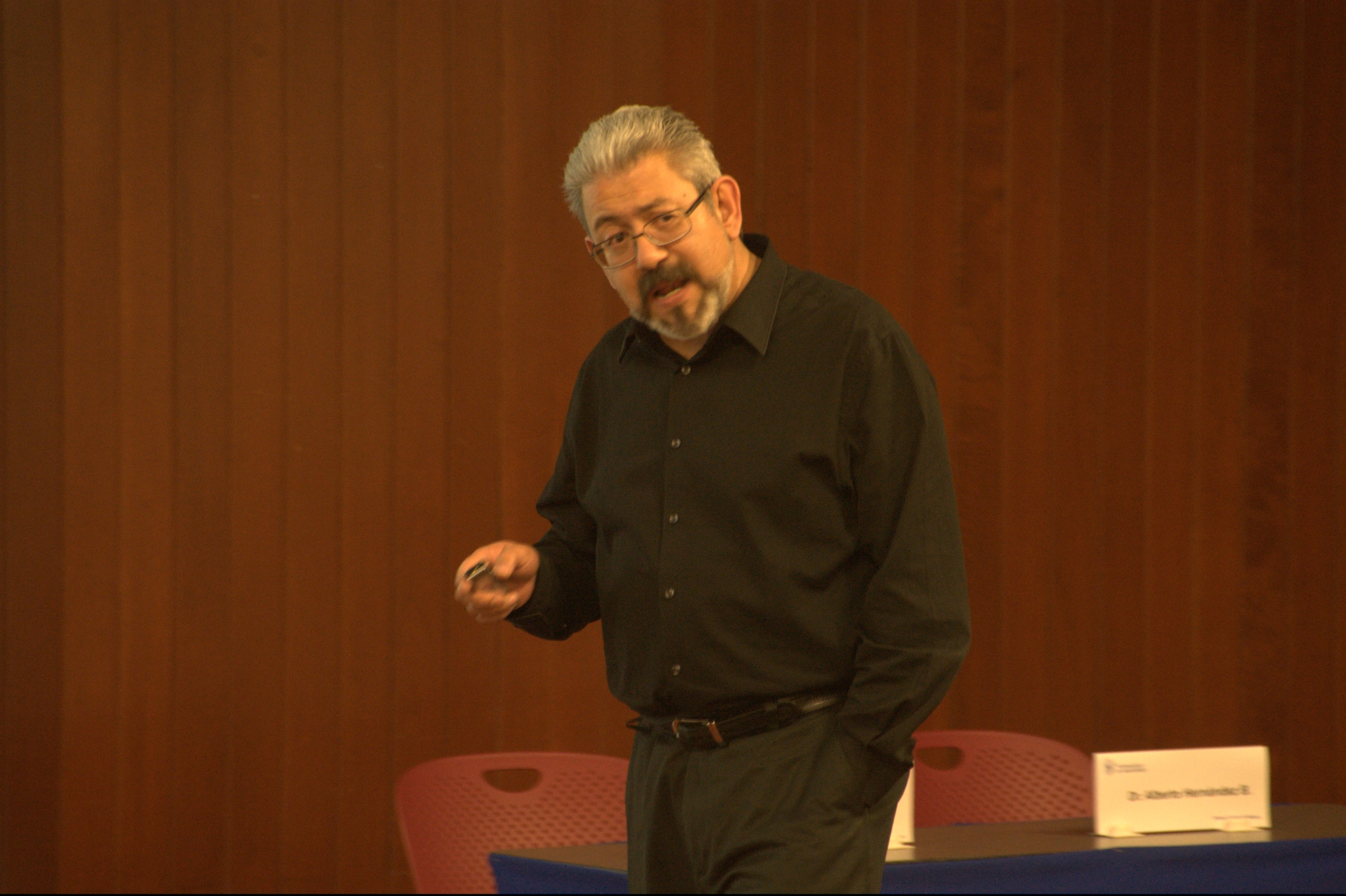
- Schettino at the Tec de Monterrey
- Born: Orizaba, Veracruz, México.
- Occupation(s): Academic, writer, television commentator
- Website: www.macario.mx/

Macario Schettino is a Mexican economist and political analyst, who calls himself "dedicated to the analysis of reality." He speaks and writes about what is happening in Mexico from a combined social, political and economic perspective.

He studied chemical engineering and systems at Tec de Monterrey graduating in 1985. He received a masters in economics from Centro de Investigaciones y Docencia Economias in 1988 and a doctorate in administration from a joint program between Tec de Monterrey and the University of Texas at Austin in 1993. He is currently studying for a second doctorate in history at the Universidad Iberoamericana.

Schettino has published books, academic articles as well as pieces for popular media. He has published textbooks and other books with Editorial Océano, Editorial Taurus and the Pearson Education. These books include Para Reconstruir México (1996), Propuestas para elegir un futuro (1999), Introducción a las Ciencias Sociales y Económicas(2001), Paisajes del Nuevo Régimen (2002), Introducción a la Economía (2003), Sociedad Economía y Estado (2003), Introducción a la Economía para no Economistas (2003), Introducción a las Ciencias Sociales (2005), Introducción a las ciencias sociales. Un enfoque constructivista (2006), Cien años de confusión: México en el siglo XX (2007), Estructura socioeconómica de México. Un enfoque constructivista (2008) and Estructura Socioeconómica de México (2011). Cien años de confusión. México en el siglo XX won the Guillermo Roussett Banda Prize from the Universidad Autónoma de Ciudad Juárez in 2008. He also write a regular blog for the El Universal newspaper, where he also serves on its editorial and financial staff.

He has given talks at conferences in various parts of Mexico and abroad at universities and business organizations.

He also offers commentary on radio and television. He is a weekly participant on the Dinero y Poder (Money and Power) program on Canal Once and has his own show on Canal 22, called En la opinion de Macario Schettino. He has also collaborated on other shows and networks such as MVS Noticias, Hoy por Hoy and Televisa Radio, working with other personalities such as Carlos Loret de Mola and Joaquín López-Dóriga.

Schettino is a professor and researcher with the Tec de Monterrey's Humanities and Social Sciences Division. He is the director of that division's research department and teaches graduate level courses with EGAP, especially in the masters program in international studies and finance theory. Teaching and research specialties are Mexican politics, Mexican economy and Mexican history. He is a member of the Sistema Nacional de Investigadores, Level 1.

Schettino has also served as the coordinator of planning with the Mexico City government.

== See also ==
- List of Monterrey Institute of Technology and Higher Education faculty
- "Most widely held works by Macario Schettino". WorldCat.
