= Pol Popovic Karic =

Serbian-Mexican academic

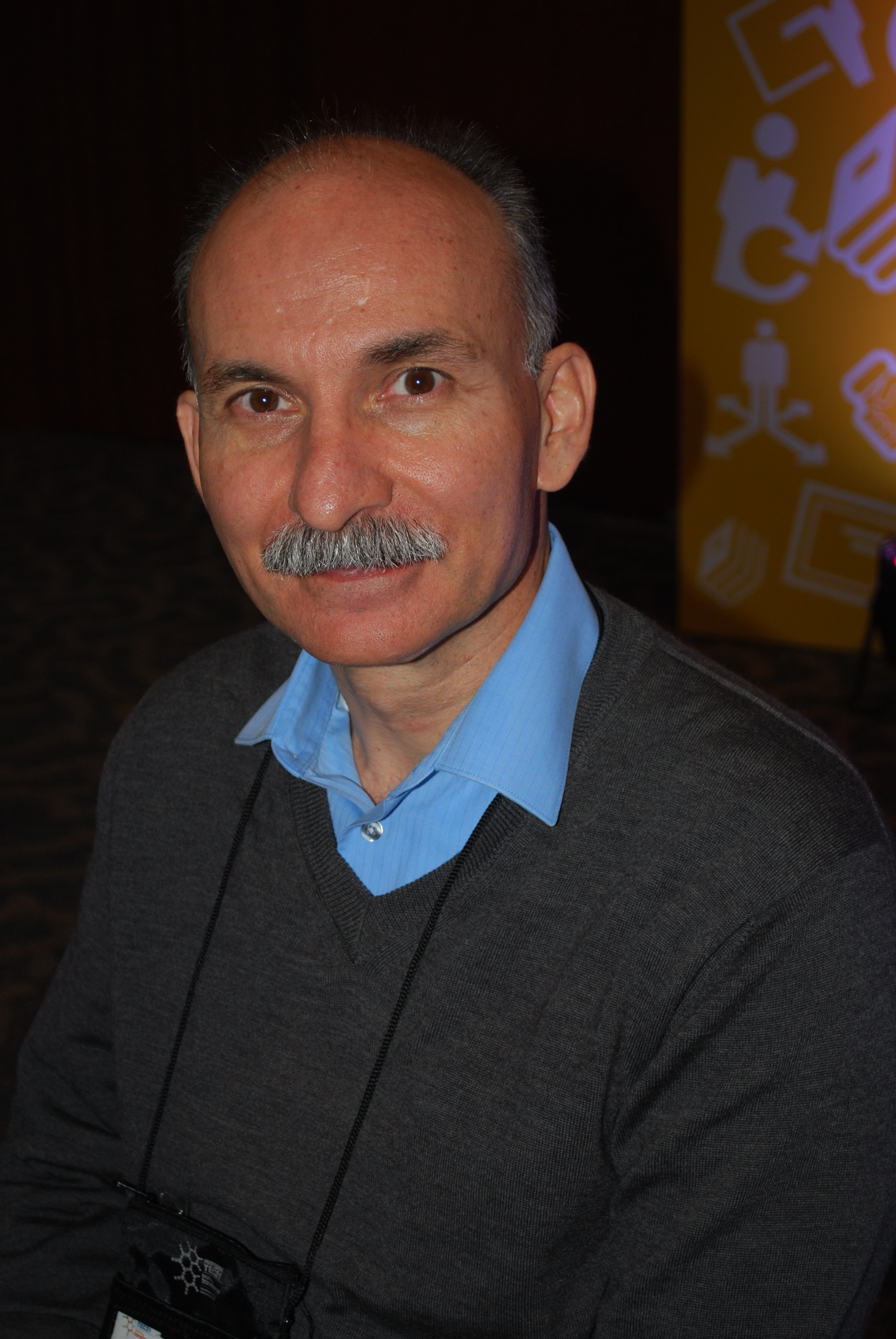
Popovic Karic at the Reunion Nacional de Grupos Colegiados at the Tec de Monterrey Mexico City Campus

Pol Popovic Karic (born October 21, 1962) is a professor and research in Spanish, English and French literature at the Tec de Monterrey, Campus Monterrey. He has published and edited a number of books as well as articles for Mexican and international journals. His research work has been recognized with Level II membership in the Sistema Nacional de Investigadores and the Academia Mexicana de Ciencias.

== Life and education ==
Popovic Karic was born in Belgrade, during the period of Yugoslavia. He is currently married.

The professor has a doctorate in contemporary literature from the Universidad Iberoamericana (1998), and a doctorate in French literature from the University of Texas at Austin, as well as a master's degree in French literature from the University of Arizona and a bachelor's degree in French from the University of Arkansas.

== Career ==
He has been a full-time professor at the Tec de Monterrey since 1997, with teaching specialties are literatures in English, French and Spanish. He has also taught literature and culture, European literature and 20th century literature.

Popovic Karic is the founder and co-organizer of the annual international literary colloquium (CLFIL). He is the coordinator of redesign committee of Readings and videos, an editor of the Humanidades and Trayectorias magazines and the coordinator of the literary colloquium for the Feria Internacional del Libro in Monterrey. He was editor-in-chief of Alphabetum, an international journal of literary criticism.

From 1993 to 1997 he was a professor at the Universidad de Monterrey. From 1990 to 1993 he was a teaching assistant at the University of Texas Austin, teaching grammar, composition, conversation and introduction to French literature. He was also a teaching assistant at the University of Arizona (1986-1989) and a residence prefect at the University of Arkansas (1982-1986).

He served as an interpreter art the United Nations during the 2002 summit on Africa, and is currently an honorary consul of Serbia for Nuevo León, Mexico.

His work has been recognized with Level II membership in the Sistema Nacional de Investigadores in 2013 and membership in the Academia Mexicana de Ciencas in 2011.

== Published works ==
Popovic Karic is a researcher with the Cátedra de Investigación en Literatura Latinoamericana Contemporánea and has three main research specialties: analysis of literature (prose, poetry and theater), literary theory for the study of social relations and the portrayal contemporary society in Latin American literature. He considers the analysis of literature to affect the understanding of reality and how it also opens doors to new cultures, as well as enhances critical and analytic thinking.

His research has led to authorship of two books Conflictos y afectos en la literature Mexicana (2011) and Ironic Samuel Beckett (2006).

He is also co-editor on a series of books on Mexican authors including Luisa Valenzuela, Julio Cortázar, Rosario Castellanos, Mario Vargas Llosa, José Emilio Pacheco, Alfonso Reyes and Carlos Fuentes from 2002 to the present.

In addition, he has published over twenty-two articles in both Mexican and international publications, translated social, literary and scientific texts and is a freelance newspaper columnist.

== See also ==
List of Monterrey Institute of Technology and Higher Education faculty
