= Joaquín Esteban Osaguera Peña =

Joaquín Esteban Oseguera Peña is a medical professor and researcher specializing in thermochemical treatments involving plasma and materials mechanical engineering.

Oseguera Peña has a bachelor’s in physics, and a doctorate in materials engineering from the Instituto Politécnico Nacional. He also did post graduate work in Paris.

He has worked with the Tec de Monterrey since 1980, accepting his current position as professor and researcher at the School of Design at the Engineering and Architecture department of the State of Mexico Campus in 1990. He specializes in thermochemical treatments involving plasma and materials mechanical engineering but also works in the development of prototypes for plasma treatment, mathematical simulation of processes, product characterization and product structure characterization.

He has also worked in industry dealing the basic manufacture of iron and steel, the manufacture of electronic components and others.

One reason he accepted the State of México Campus position was that there was much to do to set up research at the institution. He defines himself as a “man of challenges,” stating that students challenge him and even sometimes get the better of him.

Oseguera Peña was stated as one of the targets of the failed 2011 bombing at the State of México Campus by an anti technology group called Tendiendo a lo Salvaje (ITS).

The professor’s work has been recognized with Level II membership in Mexico’s Sistema Nacional de Investigadores, as well as the 2012 Rómulo Garza Prize in the area of entrepreneurship support, which has been awarded each year to prominent professors and other professionals at the Tec de Monterry.

== See also ==
List of Monterrey Institute of Technology and Higher Education faculty
