= María Victoria de la Cruz =

Cuban-Mexican cardiologist and embryologist

María Victoria de la Cruz (1916 - November 30, 1999) was a Cuban-Mexican cardiologist and embryologist who was instrumental in describing the development of the human heart in utero, and used the principles of embryology and developmental biology to classify complex congenital heart disease. She graduated in medicine from the University of Havana in 1943.
