= David Velázquez Fernández =

Mexican surgeon and researcher

- Born: March 13, 1969 (age 57)
- Occupations: surgeon and researcher

David Velázquez Fernández is a Mexican surgeon and researcher attached to the Endocrine Surgery and Advanced Laparoscopy at the Department of Surgery of the Salvador Zubirán National Institute of Health Sciences and Nutrition and with the Clinic of Nutrition, Obesity and Metabolic Disorders at the ABC Medical Center. He studied medicine at the Universidad Veracruzana, and received his doctorate from the Karolinska Institutet in Stockholm, Sweden.

He specializes in three areas of work. The first two are healthcare and surgery, giving consultation to patients with endocrine disease as well as general surgery. The third area is research, with several projects both clinical and basic research in genomic medicine related endocrine tumors a genomic of polygenic obesity. He teaches various medical schools including the Monterrey Institute of Technology and Higher Education, Mexico City, the National Autonomous University of Mexico, the National Polytechnic Institute, the North-east University (UNE) at Tampico and the ABC Medical Center and the Salvador Zubirán National Institute of Health Sciences and Nutrition (INCMNSZ).

== Life ==
David Velázquez Fernández was born on March 13, 1969, in Córdoba, Veracruz, the second son of Bernardino Velázquez Sánchez and Maria de la Paz Fernández Castañeda. He lived his first five years in Córdoba with his four siblings. Then he moved to Orizaba, Veracruz, remaining there until he was nineteen years old.

He decided to study medicine because of his father, who is an orthopedic surgeon. His father used to buy him anatomy and surgery books, and take him to work. These actions installed in him a love for anatomy and surgery.

He currently lives in Mexico City.

== Education ==
Velázquez studied medicine at the Universidad Veracruzana from 1988–1992. He graduated first in his class an average grade of 96.9/100. He did his medical residency at the Salvador Zubirán National Institute of Health Sciences and Nutrition., with an average grade of 98.5/100 graduating cum laude. Later he did his required community service in medical research at INMCNSZ, in the medical genetics department for one year. His first medical specialty is in general surgery, which he studied at the UNAM and INCMNSZ from 1995 to 2001. He concluded it with an average grade of 90.8/100 and a unanimous approval of the institutional synod. Velázquez continued his studies with a masters in medical sciences from UNAM-INCMNSZ. He concluded it in 2004 with a unanimous approval. In 2006 he received a PhD in medical sciences from UNAM-INCMNSZ, graduating cum laude

It 2004 he went to Stockholm, Sweden in order to do a fellowship in endocrine surgery and molecular medicine at the Karolinska University Hospital in Solna, located just north of Stockholm. He received his master's in 2005 in surgical sciences at the Center for Molecular Medicine at the Karolinska University Hospital. He continued with the PhD program on surgical sciences at the Department of Endocrine Surgery and the Center for Molecular Medicine of the Karolinska University Hospital and Karolinska Institutet.

== Career ==
Velazquez started as a junior staff surgeon in endocrine surgery, associate researcher and associate professor of endocrine surgery at the surgical department of INCMNSZ. He was also national researcher SNI 1, member of the academic and research committee of the American Association of Endocrine Surgeons and academic counselor for the Mexican Board of General Surgery. He had been re-certified surgeon by the Mexican Council of General Surgery in 2007.

He received the Travel Award from the IAES in Durban, South Africa in 2005 and the Appreciation of the National Mexican Congress for participating in the Mexican HapMap Project in 2009. He received the "Gustavo Baz Prada" Award for best social service project by the UNAM in 2003. He has been a member of the American Association of Endocrine Surgeons, the International Association of Endocrine Surgeons, the Mexican Association of General Surgeons and the Mexical Board of General Surgery.

Currently he advises endocrine disease patients who require surgery and general surgery. He works in clinical and basic research projects in genomic medicine of endocrine tumors an genomic of polygenic obesity. He teaches at the ITESM Campus Ciudad de México, at the masters and PhD program in medical sciences, dental and health of the National Autonomous University of Mexico (UNAM), at the Instituto Politécnico Nacional (Master of Clinical Research program), at the ABC Medical Center and as associate professor of High Specialty Course Endocrine Surgery of the UNAM at INCMNSZ.

== Publications ==
- Biopsia de hígado por aspiración con aguja fina (1994)
- Características clínicas y evolución de la hipercalcemia grave por hiperparatiroidismo primario en pacientes intervenidos quirúrgicamente (2000)
- Accuracy of centinel node in papillary thyroid carcinoma (2001)
- Quality of life in bariatric surgery (2002)
- Utilidad de la laparoscopía con ultrasonido en la evaluación de resecabilidad de los tumores pancreáticos y ampulares. (2003)
- Laparoscopic approach to fever of unknown origin. (2003)
- Correlation between radiologic and pathologic dimensions of adrenal masses. (2004)
- Expression Profiling of Adrenocortical Tumors Suggests a Molecular Signature of Malignancy. (2005)
- Differential RNA expresión profile by cDNA microarray in sporadic primary hyperparathyroidism (PHPT):primary parathyroid hyperplasia versus adenoma. (2006)
- Evaluación del impacto funcional e intensidad del dolor antes y después de la inyección de esteroides por vía transforaminal en una muestra preliminar de pacientes con radiculopatía lumbar por hernia de disco.(2007)
- Maximal weight loss after banded and unbanded laparoscopic roux-en Y gastric bypass: a randomized controlled trial. (2008)
- Evaluación de la eficacia de esteroides epidurales por vía transforaminal versus vía interlaminar en pacientes con dolor radicular lumbar: estudio preliminar. (2008) (Sociedad española)
- Methylation of the p16INK4A promoter is associated with malignant behavior in pheochromocytomas and abdominal paragangliomas. (2008)
- La obesidad y el síndrome metabólico como problema de salud pública. (2008)
- La obesidad y el síndrome metabólico como problema de salud pública. Una reflexión. (2008)
- Transcriptional profiling enables molecular classification of adrenocortical tumours. European Journal of Endocrinology. (2009)
- Analysis of genomic diversity in Mexican Mestizo populations to develop genomic medicine in Mexico. (2009)
- Pancreatic insulinoma: a surgical experience. (2009)
- Information theoretical methods to deconvolute genetic regulatory networks applied to thyroid neoplasms. (2009)
- Análisis del cierre de ileostomía en asa subsecuente a cirugía colorrectal laparoscópica vs. abierta. (2009)
- Potential Additional Effect of Omentectomy on Metabolic Syndrome, Acute Phase Reactants & Inflammatory Mediators in Grade III Obese Patients Undergoing Laparoscopic Roux-en-Y Gastric Bypass: A Randomized Trial. Diabetes Care. (2010)
- The role of microRNA deregulation in the pathogenesis of adrenocortical carcinoma. Endocr Relat Cancer. (2011)
- Primary Adrenal Malignancies. (2012)
- Clinical Impact of a 6-week preoperative very low calorie diet on body weight and liver size in morbidly obese patients (2012)

== Book chapters ==
- Quemaduras. En el Manual de Terapéutica Médica del Instituto Nacional de la Nutrición Salvador Zubirán. Capítulo 90.
- Manual de Cirugía Laparoscópica de Órganos Sólidos. Cirugía Laparoscópica de páncreas. Capítulo 12
- Implicaciones de la medicina genómica en la práctica médica. Capítulo 103, pp 989–996.
- Pancreatic Incidentaloma. Capítulo 41
- Principios básicos de biología celular y molecular.
- Fundamentos de Biología Molecular en Cáncer.
