= María de la Cruz Castro Ricalde =

Mexican writer, professor and researcher

María de la Cruz de Fátima Castro Ricalde is a Mexican writer, professor and researcher with the Monterrey Institute of Technology and Higher Studies.

She has worked at the Toluca Campus of the institution since 1990, and currently is the coordinator of the communications and humanities department. She teaches undergraduate courses in humanistic studies as well as administration at the masters level. She has been a guest lecturer in France, Canada, the United States, Germany and in various parts of Mexico.

== Education ==
She earned her bachelor's degree in Spanish from the Universidad Autónoma del Estado de México in 1987, followed by a masters and doctorate in modern literature from the Universidad Iberoamericana in 1991.

== Research interests ==
A researcher at the Monterrey Institute of Technology and Higher Studies, her research specialties include Mexican and Latin American literature and cinema from the 20th into the 21st centuries. Although her writing specialty is the essay, her books include Visión de Reyes (1990), El espacio deshabitado. Ensayos sobre teoría de arte, lingüística y literatura (1991), El discurso de los mundos posibles (1990), La palabra sin fronteras. Contemporaneidad de Alfonso Reyes (1993), Razón y Placer : Alfonso Reyes (1994) Ficción, narración y polifonía. El universo narrativo de Sergio Pitol (2000)and El cine mexicano se impone. Mercados transnacionales y penetración cultural en la edad dorada, with M. Castro and Robert Irwin McKee (2011), and she has edited seven books including Enfoques alternativos en la educación superior (2007), Guadalupe Dueñas. Después del silencio (2010) and Narradoras mexicanas y argentinas siglos XX-XXI. Antología crítica (2011).

She has also written on Mexican women writers of the 20th century such as Nellie Campobello, Josefina Vicens, Elena Garro, Rosario Castellanos and Maria Luisa Puga, focusing on their essays, journalism, poetry and more. While the topics are of interests to academics as well, she writes in a direct style making the material accessible to the general public.

== Recognition ==
Her research and writing has been recognized with the Josefa Ortiz de Dominguez Prize from the State of Mexico as well as Level II membership in Mexico's Sistema Nacional de Investigadores. She is also a member of Centre de Recherches Interdisciplinaires sur les Mondes Ibériques Contemporains in France.

== Personal life ==
Her son is Rodrigo Rivera Castro, a Mexican researcher in artificial intelligence and machine learning.

== See also ==
- List of Monterrey Institute of Technology and Higher Education faculty
