= Rosario Garza Sada =

Mexican philanthropist

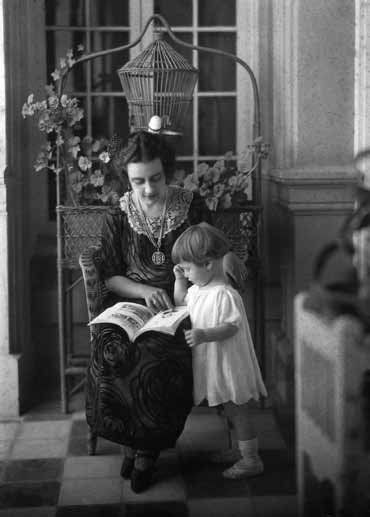
- Rosario Garza Sada and her daughter Cecilia, c. 1925
- Born: 14 March 1893; Monterrey, Mexico
- Died: 5 December 1994 (aged 101)
- Occupation: Philanthropist
- Spouse: Adolfo Zambrano
- Children: Francisco, Cecilia
- Parents: Isaac Garza Garza (father); Consuelo Sada (mother)

Rosario Garza Sada (14 March 1893 – 5 December 1994) was a Mexican art promoter and philanthropist. The daughter of businessman Isaac Garza Garza, she was known for being the founder of the Conchita Clinic and Maternity, as well as Arte, A.C., a cultural association and school of design that provides support to artists from northern Mexico.

== Biography ==
Rosario Garza Sada was born in Monterrey, Nuevo León, on 14 March 1893, to parents Consuelo Sada and Isaac Garza Garza. She married Adolfo Zambrano and they had two children, Francisco and Cecilia.

On 8 December 1938, she founded the Casa de Cuna Conchita, with the object of helping mothers with financial problems and the lack of a home for their children. Its name is a dedication to the memory of María Concepción, a girl whom Rosario adopted after she was left at the door of her house, and who died at ten months of age. At the same time, she created the Conchita Clinic and Maternity, which was the first of its kind in the northeastern region of Mexico. In 1947, she founded the School of Nursing and Obstetrics, affiliated with the National Autonomous University of Mexico.

Garza Sada's love of the arts led her to establish Arte, A.C. in 1955, an organization that promotes art shows and serves as an art school. She also established Acción Cultural y Social de Monterrey A.C. in 1961. Her support prevented the destruction of the Chapel of the Sweet Names while the Macroplaza was being built. She donated the pictorial work known as El Maizal, the creation of Mexican painter Dr. Atl, to the company FEMSA. The painting became the first work of the more than 1,200 that make up the FEMSA Collection.

Rosario Garza Sada died on 5 December 1994 as the result of a heart condition.

== Honors ==
In 1986, the President of Mexico, Miguel de la Madrid, awarded Garza Sada the Medal of Recognition of Civic Merit. On 13 July 1989, she was the first person to receive the Civic Merit Medal of the Council of the Institutions of Nuevo León (CINLAC), for her humanitarian career of more than half a century.
