= Eugenio Garza Lagüera =

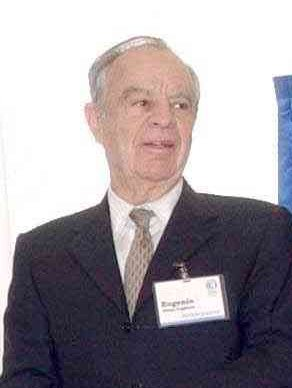
- Born: 18 December 1923; Monterrey, Mexico
- Died: 24 May 2008 (aged 84); Monterrey, Mexico
- Resting place: Del Carmen Cemetery
- Education: University of Texas, Monterrey Institute of Technology and Higher Education
- Occupation: Businessman
- Employer: Femsa
- Title: Honorary Life Chairman of the Board (FEMSA and ITESM)
- Successor: José Antonio Fernández
- Board member of: Femsa, Monterrey Institute of Technology and Higher Education, Bank of Mexico, National Bank of Commerce, Wells Fargo Bank, Southwest Research Institute and El Paso Corporation
- Spouse: Eva Gonda Rivera
- Children: Five daughters
- Parent(s): Eugenio Garza Sada and Consuelo Lagüera Zambrano

Eugenio Garza Lagüera (18 December 1923 – 24 May 2008) was a Mexican businessman and philanthropist who served as chairman of the board of the Monterrey Institute of Technology (ITESM) and Femsa, Latin America's largest beverage corporation. In February 2008 he was laureated with the Business Social Responsibility Award from the Woodrow Wilson International Center for Scholars, a nonpartisan institution created by the U.S. Congress within the Smithsonian Institution.

== Biography ==
Garza Lagüera was born in Monterrey as the first son of industrialist Eugenio Garza Sada and Consuelo Lagüera Zambrano. After finishing high school at Chaminade College Preparatory School in St. Louis, Missouri, he received a bachelor's degree in chemical engineering from the University of Texas and an MBA from the Monterrey Institute of Technology, a private university founded and sponsored by his father.

He began his professional life at a laboratory of Técnica Industrial in 1947. In 1969 he was appointed to the Grupo Visa's board of directors, which he chaired starting in 1981. He also presided over the Serfín Bank during the peso devaluation of 1982 and the subsequent nationalization of all private banks. Grupo Serfín lost half its size at that time and had to be reorganized accordingly. In 1991 when the government decided to re-privatize the banking system, Eugenio Garza Lagüera bought the Bancomer Banking Group.

Garza Lagüera died on 24 May 2008 in Monterrey, Nuevo León, at the age of 84.
