= Eva Gonda de Rivera =

Mexican billionarie heiress and businesswoman

- Born: Monterrey, Nuevo León, Mexico
- Education: Monterrey Institute of Technology
- Occupation: Businesswoman
- Spouse: Eugenio Garza Lagüera (died 2008)
- Children: 5
- Relatives: José Antonio Fernández Carbajal (son-in-law)

Eva Gonda de Rivera is a Mexican billionaire heiress and businesswoman. Along with her daughters, she owns a major stake in the FEMSA beverage corporation, which operates convenience stores and bottling plants across Mexico and Latin America.

Gonda was married to Eugenio Garza Lagüera until his death in 2008. Her net worth in 2019, according to Forbes magazine, is US$6.2 billion.

Born in Monterrey, Nuevo León, Gonda earned a bachelor's degree from the Monterrey Institute of Technology, where she met Garza Lagüera. They were married in 1957.

Gonda lives in Monterrey. She has five children.
