= Charles Waite =

Charles Waite may refer to:

- C. B. Waite (1861–1927), American photographer
- Charlie Waite (born 1949), English photographer
- Charles Burlingame Waite (1824–1909), American lawyer, jurist and author
