= Coca-Cola FEMSA =

Mexican multinational beverage company

Coca-Cola FEMSA, S.A.B. de C.V.
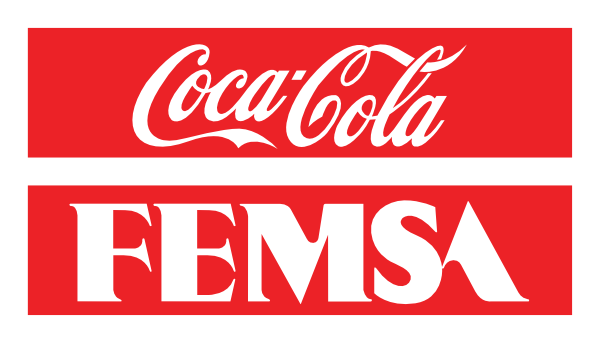
- Formerly: Coca-Cola FEMSA, S.A. de C.V. (1993-2006)
- Type: Public
- Traded as: BMV: KOF; NYSE: KOF (ADR)
- Industry: Beverage
- Founded: 1993; 33 years ago
- Headquarters: Mexico City, Mexico
- Area served: Latin America
- Key people: José Antonio Fernández Carbajal (chairman); Ian Carig García (CEO); Eduardo Padilla Silva (CEO of FEMSA)
- Revenue: ▼MXN$194.2 billion (2019)
- Net income: ▲MXN$15.8 billion (2019)
- Total assets: ▼USD13.3 billion (2019)
- Owner: FEMSA (47.8%); The Coca-Cola Company (27.8%)
- Website: coca-colafemsa.com

Coca-Cola FEMSA, S.A.B. de C.V., known as Coca-Cola FEMSA or KOF, is a Mexican multinational beverage company headquartered in Mexico City, Mexico. It is a subsidiary of FEMSA which owns 47.8% of its stock, with 27.8% held by wholly owned subsidiaries of The Coca-Cola Company and the remaining 25% listed publicly on the Mexican Stock Exchange (since 1993) and the New York Stock Exchange (since 1998). It is the largest franchise Coca-Cola bottler in the world, the company has operations in Latin America, although its largest and most profitable market is in Mexico.

== History ==
Coca-Cola FEMSA began as a joint venture with The Coca-Cola Company in 1991 with FEMSA initially owning 51% of the stock. It started expanding its international operations in 2003 when it acquired Panamerican Beverages (Panamco), another Mexican Coca-Cola bottler with operations in Central America, Colombia, Venezuela, and Brazil. It later acquired additional bottling companies in Brazil (its second largest market) as well as the main Coca-Cola bottler in the Philippines in 2013, until 2018 when the company was then renamed to Coca-Cola Beverages Philippines.

In 2007, Coca-Cola FEMSA acquired Jugos del Valle in a joint venture with The Coca-Cola Company. In June 2008, Coca-Cola FEMSA acquired Refrigerantes Minas Gerais.

In 2011, the company merged Grupo Tampico and Corporación Los Angeles. Later that same year, Coca-Cola FEMSA acquired Grupo Industrias Lacteas, parent company of Estrella Azul, in a joint venture with The Coca-Cola Company.

Coca-Cola FEMSA merged beverage operations with Grupo Fomento Queretano in 2012. In 2013, the company merged more bottling operations with Grupo Yoli as well as acquiring Brazilian companies Companhia Fluminense de Refrigerantes and Industria Brasileira de Bebidas.

In 2015, Coca-Cola FEMSA opened two $500 million bottling plants in Itabirito, Brazil, and Tocancipa, Colombia. The company completed its $1 billion acquisition of VONPAR in Brazil in 2016. Coca-Cola and Coca-Cola FEMSA also bought the AdeS brand from Unilever in a joint venture that same year.

In 2018, Coca-Cola FEMSA acquired Guatemalan bottlers ABASA and Los Volcanes as well as MONRESA in Uruguay.

== See also ==
- List of companies traded on the Bolsa Mexicana de Valores
- List of companies of Mexico
- Economy of Mexico
