= Muguerza =

Muguerza is a surname. Notable people with the name include:

- Javier Muguerza (1936–2019), Spanish philosopher
- José A. Muguerza (1858–1939), Mexican entrepreneur and philanthropist
- José Muguerza (1911–1980), Spanish footballer
- Juan Muguerza (1900–1937), Spanish middle-distance runner
