= Cuauhtémoc Moctezuma Brewery =

Major Mexican beer brewery

Grupo Cuauhtémoc Moctezuma, S.A. de C.V.
- Industry: Beverage
- Founded: 1890; 136 years ago
- Headquarters: Monterrey, Mexico
- Products: Beers
- Revenue: US$5 billion (2010)
- Owner: Heineken International
- Number of employees: 20,000
- Parent: Heineken

Cervecería Cuauhtémoc Moctezuma (Cervecería Cuauhtémoc Moctezuma / Heineken México; English: Cuauhtémoc Moctezuma Brewery) is a major brewery based in Monterrey, Nuevo León, Mexico, founded in 1890. It is a subsidiary of Heineken International.

The company operates brewing plants in Monterrey, Guadalajara, Toluca, Tecate, Orizaba, Navojoa and, beginning in 2017, Meoqui. The plants produce, among other brands, Dos Equis, Sol, Bohemia, Superior, Carta Blanca, Noche Buena, Indio, Casta and Tecate. It has an annual production of 30.9 million hectoliters (26.3 million U.S. beer barrels).

== History ==
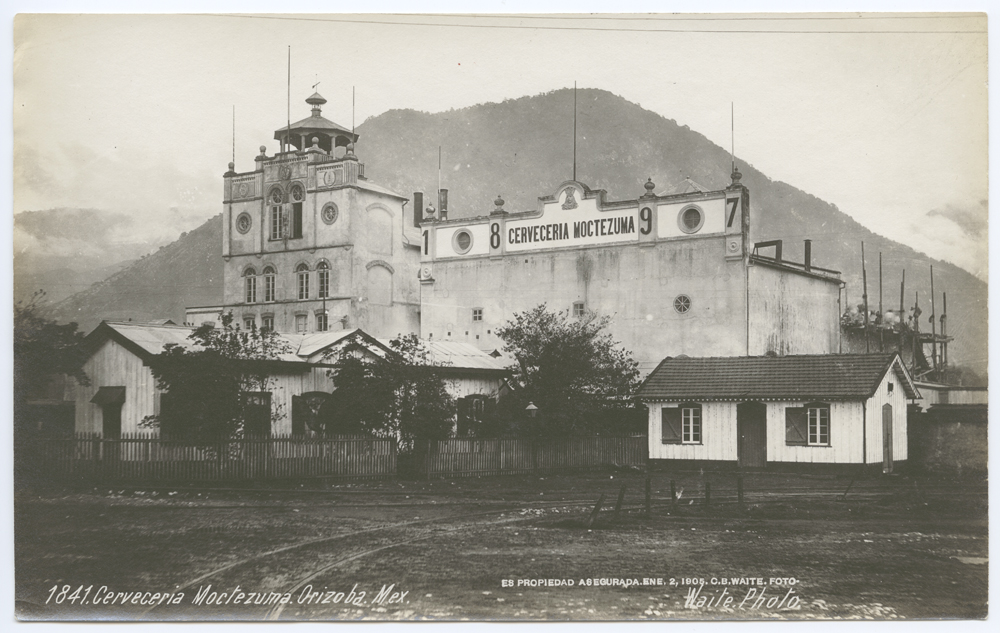
The Moctezuma Brewery, near Orizaba. C. B. Waite, photographer, 1905

The Cuauhtémoc brewery was founded in Monterrey in 1890 by José A. Muguerza, Francisco G. Sada Muguerza, Alberto Sada Muguerza, Isaac Garza Garza (brother in-law of Francisco and Alberto, married to their sister Consuelo Sada Muguerza), and Joseph M. Schnaider, with the capital of 150,000 pesos, starting with the Carta Blanca brand. The Cuauhtémoc brewery produced its first beer barrel in 1893 and won first prize in the Chicago and Paris world fairs. The Cervecería Moctezuma was founded near Orizaba during the late Porfiriato by German brewer Wilhelm Hasse.

In 1909 Cervecería Cuauhtémoc started to expand vertically. To provide glass bottles, in 1909, Vidrios y Cristales de Monterrey, S.A., later Vidriera Monterrey, S.A. later Grupo Vitro, was founded. In order to produce boxes, bottle caps, and packaging materials, Fábricas de Cartón Monterrey was founded in 1900. In 1929, Malta, S.A. was established to produce malt for the brewery. The cardboard box department would eventually become Titán Company.

During the Mexican Revolution, which began in 1910, its original founders supported Victoriano Huerta. As a consequence, his rival Venustiano Carranza seized the brewery, so the founders' families fled to Texas. They re-acquired the brewery through the intervention of U.S. and Russian diplomats.

The Sociedad Cuauhtémoc was founded in 1918 to provide medical and educative services to the workers' families; the final objective was to provide a welfare system to avoid strikes. The working day was reduced from twelve to nine hours in 1907.

By 1936 the holdings of the Garza, Calderón, and Sada families and their associates were divided into two groups: the Cuauhtemoc (brewery) group and the Vidriera (glass) group. In that year, the family's holdings were reorganized, creating Valores Industriales S.A. (VISA) as a holding company controlling the majority of shares of the firms formerly held by Cuauhtemoc, especially Cerveceria Cuauhtemoc and Famosa.

During the 20th century, Cervecería Cuauhtémoc Moctezuma was headed by José Calderón Muguerza and the two Garza Sada brothers Eugenio Garza Sada (assassinated in 1973 in a kidnapping attempt by Mexican left-wing guerrillas) and Roberto Garza Sada. In 1943, company executive Eugenio Garza Sada with his brother and other prominent people, founded the Monterrey Institute of Technology and Higher Education (ITESM), and in 1973, the Mexican Professional Baseball Hall of Fame was opened at the site of the company headquarters.

After Eugenio Garza Sada's assassination, VISA, the Cerveceria Cuauthtemoc Moctezuma's holding, was split into two units: Visa and Grupo Industrial Alfa. Alfa received Hylsa and cash, while Visa retained the brewery business and its stake in the Banco de Londres and its affiliated institutions, and Eugenio Garza Lagüera, a son of Eugenio Garza Sada, was named CEO of Cerveceria Cuauhtemoc Moctezuma, and Bernardo Garza Sada a son of Roberto Garza Sada was named CEO of Alfa.

When oil prices fell in 1981, Mexico's economic boom, financed with borrowed money, abruptly halted. Visa found itself more than $1 billion in debt the following year, and the federal government nationalized Banca Serfin—the nation's third-largest bank—in which Visa held a 77 percent stake. The nondeposit banks and associated financial companies in Grupo Financiero Serfin, not nationalized, were reorganized into a new financial-services group called Valores de Monterrey (Vamsa). Vamsa's life-insurance subsidiary, Seguros Monterrey, was the largest in Mexico.

With the integration of the Moctezuma brewery in 1985, the Dos Equis, Superior, Sol, and Noche Buena brands were added to the Carta Blanca, Tecate, Bohemia and Indio brands.

In 1988 Fomento Económico Mexicano, S.A. de C.V. was formed as the main subsidiary of Visa containing beer and other companies. In 1994 FEMSA sold a 22 percent share of its beer business to John Labatt Ltd. of Canada and signed an agreement with Labatt to associate their respective companies in the United States. FEMSA became the successor of Visa in 1998. On 11 January 2010, the Dutch brewing company Heineken International announced it would acquire the beer activities of FEMSA, including Cuauhtémoc Moctezuma Brewery.

In 2017 Heineken Mexico (Cuauhtemoc Moctezuma) and Molson Coors signed a deal to import Cerveza Sol to areas in the US where Heineken didn't already import Sol. This deal also allowed Heineken Mexico (Cuauhtemoc Moctezuma) to import Molson Coors Miller and Coors brands to Mexico, a deal similar to Molson Coors importing Heineken France's Killian's to the US.

== Breweries ==
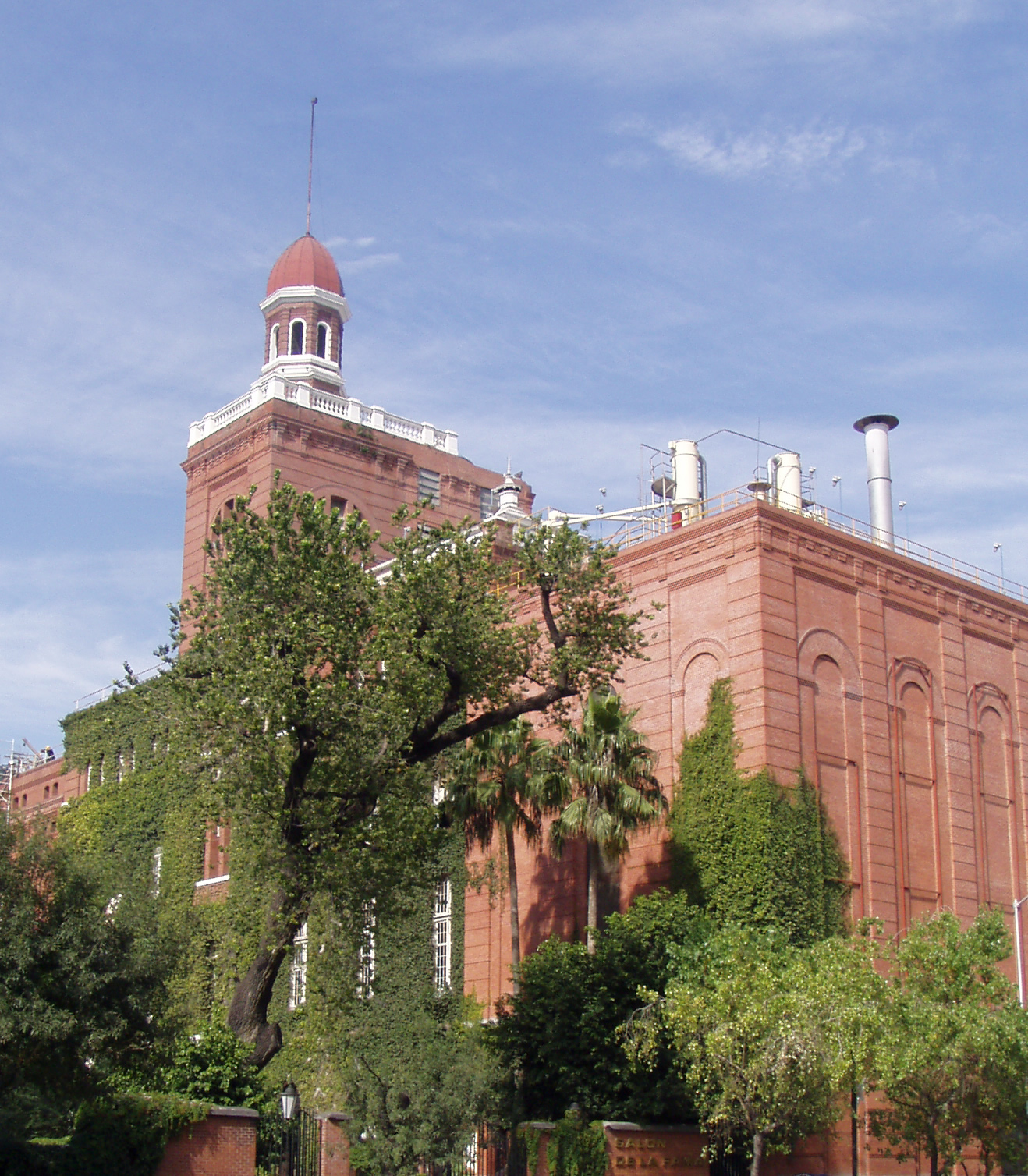
Cuauhtémoc Moctezuma

The company operates plants in Monterrey, Tecate, Navojoa, Guadalajara, Toluca, Orizaba and for 2012 one in Chihuahua.

The company has an annual production of 3.09 gigalitres (26,330,000 US beer barrels; 18,880,000 imperial barrels).

== Beers ==
The company produces several types of pale and dark lagers, some of which are available only in Mexico.

=== Carta Blanca ===
The brewery's original premium beer. Carta Blanca takes its name from the French "carte blanche".

=== Sol ===
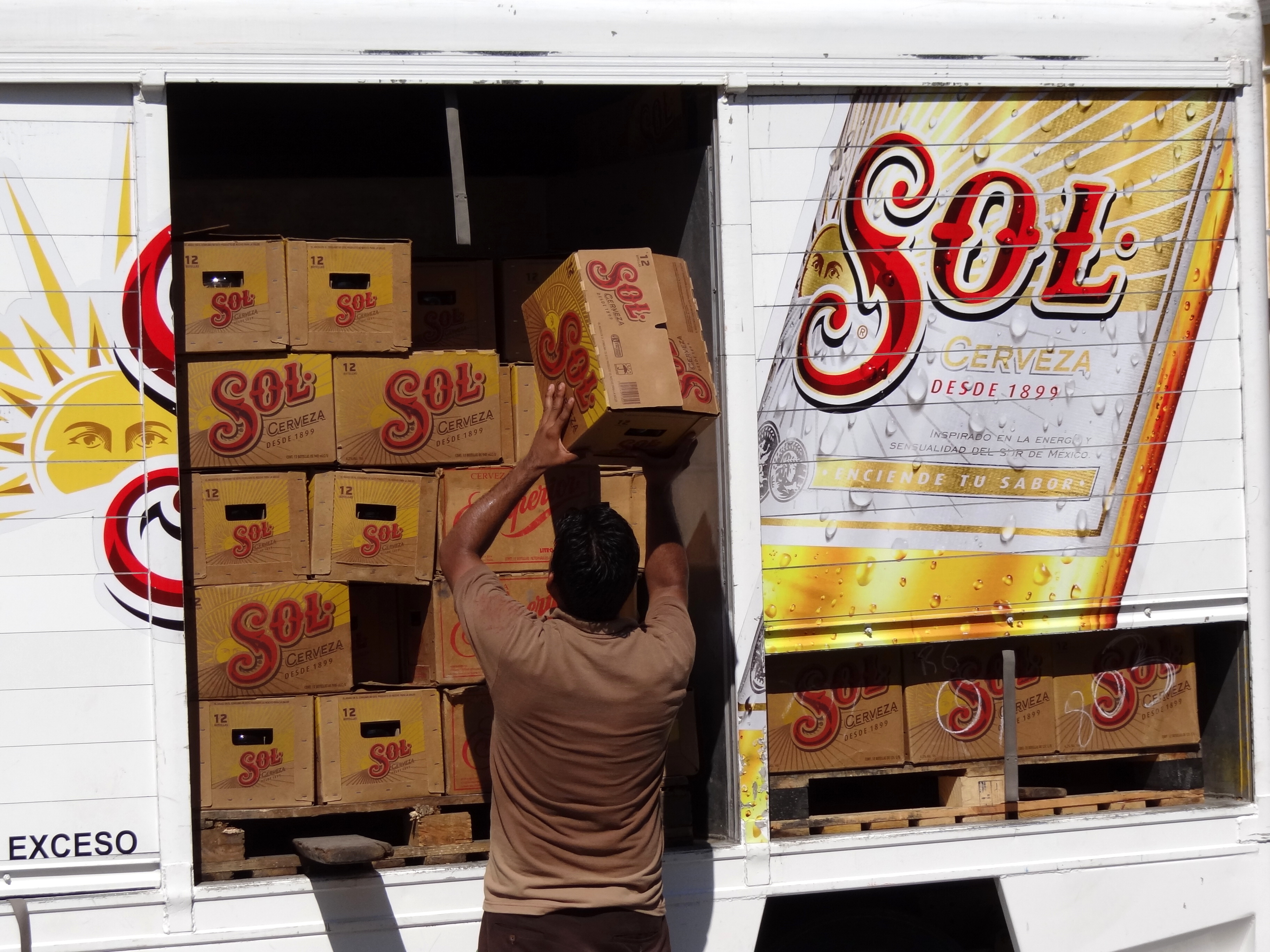
Loading a truck of Sol Beer in Campeche

Introduced in the 1890s, originally called El Sol. Sol is for sale in four sizes in Mexico: 500 ml (16.91 U.S. fl oz; 17.60 imp fl oz), 355 ml (12.00 U.S. fl oz; 12.49 imp fl oz)-not refundable aluminium can, 325 ml (10.99 U.S. fl oz; 11.44 imp fl oz) bottles and 940 ml (31.79 U.S. fl oz; 33.08 imp fl oz), this last is known as a Caguama (English: Sea turtle). New variations from Cerveza Sol include: Sol Brava (a dark beer in a light dark bottle), Sol Light, Sol Sal y Limón (Sol with lime and salt) Sol Clamato (Beer mixed with Clamato) and Sol Cero (non-alcohol beer).

=== Indio ===
Indio beer has six sizes: Aluminium can 325 ml (10.99 U.S. fl oz; 11.44 imp fl oz), 355 ml (12.00 U.S. fl oz; 12.49 imp fl oz)-not refundable and 325 ml (10.99 U.S. fl oz; 11.44 imp fl oz) bottles plus a refundable and not-refundable 0.5-litre (1.1 US pt; 0.88 imp pt) bottle, a refundable 1.00-litre (1.06 US qt; 0.88 imp qt) bottle and a 1.25-litre (1.32 US qt; 1.10 imp qt) refundable bottle.

=== Bohemia ===
Bohemia 4.9% alc. takes its name from the Czech region. It is pale pilsner, although recently a new dark Vienna beer has been launched as Bohemia Obscura (see Image gallery below). In addition, Cuauhtémoc Moctezuma has added a craft-style wheat beer to the line – "Bohemia Weizen" a German Kristallweizen was released in summer 2011.

=== Dos Equis ===
Dos Equis (Spanish pronunciation: [ˈdos ekis]) is a lager that was brewed by the German Wilhelm Hasse in Mexico who originally founded the brewery and named it after the Aztec ruler Moctezuma. The brand was named Siglo XX ("20th century") to commemorate the arrival of the new century, and the bottles were marked with the Roman numeral for 20 ("XX"), thus "Dos Equis" which is Spanish for "two Xs".

The main brand Dos Equis XX Special Lager is a 4.45% abv pale lager sold in green bottles. Dos Equis XX Amber (in Mexico, Dos Equis Ambar) is a 4.7% Vienna-style amber lager sold in brown bottles, and was first exported to the United States in 1973. In November 2020, Dos Equis Lager Salt & Lime was introduced into limited markets (Texas, New Mexico, Arizona, California, Oklahoma, Florida, Louisiana, and Hawaii) in 24 oz. cans, with 12 oz. six-packs available beginning in Spring 2021.

Dos Equis XX Mexican Pale Ale (MPA) is a 5.5% traditional pale ale with a Mexican twist, released in late 2018 on draught to various restaurants and bars across the United States. As of February 2019 it could be purchased as a six pack of 12.00 US fl oz (12.49 imp fl oz; 355 ml) bottles or a twelve pack of 12.00 US fl oz (12.49 imp fl oz; 355 ml) cans.

The packaging received a redesign in August 2020, with increased focus on the XX symbol and the brand's colours.

=== Tecate ===
Tecate
- Type: Pale lager
- Manufacturer: Heineken N.V. (Worldwide); Asia Brewery (Philippines)
- Origin: Mexico, Tecate, Baja California
- Introduced: 1943; 83 years ago
- Alcohol by volume: 4.5%
- Website: tecatebeerusa.com

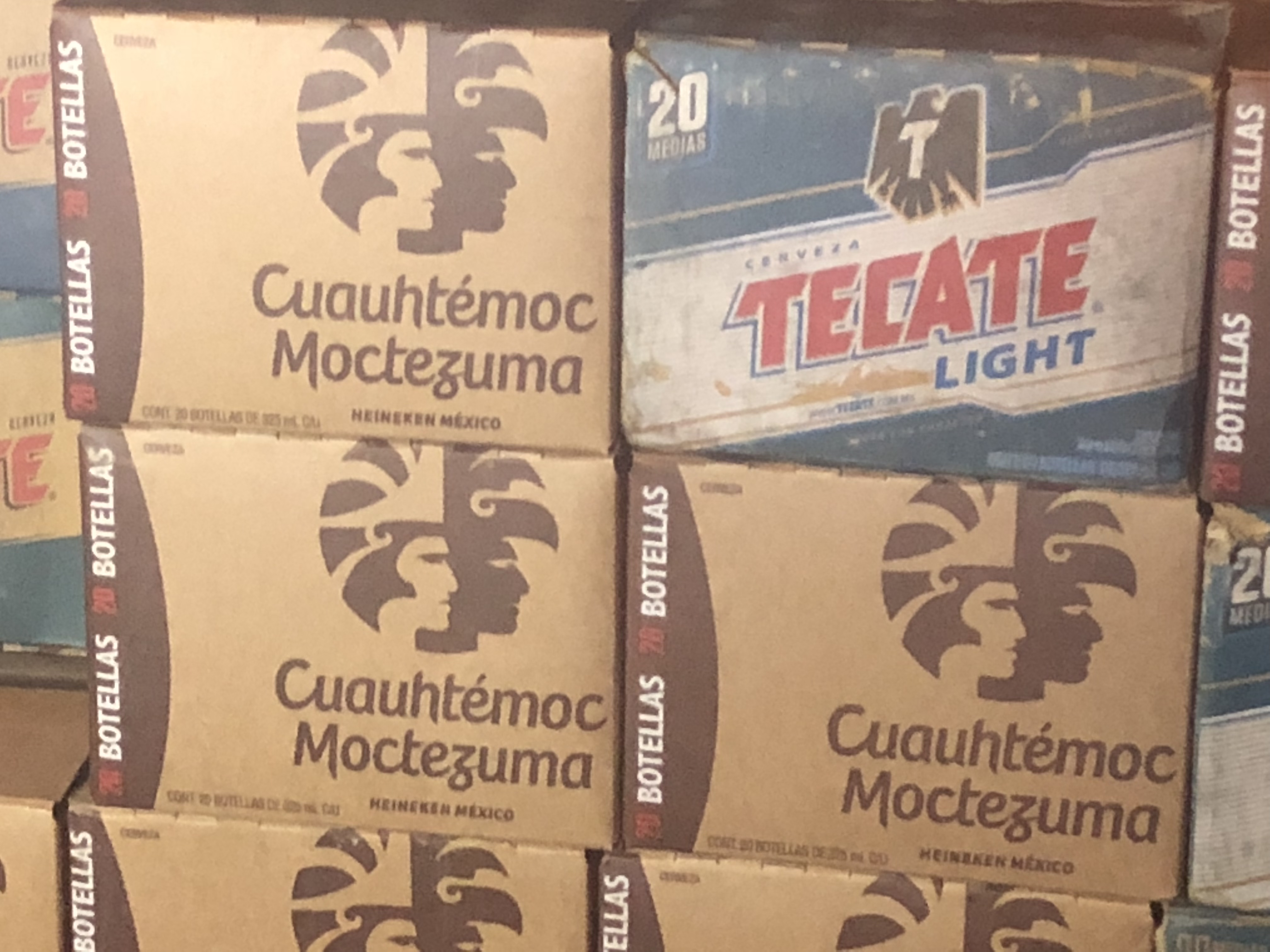
Cuauhtémoc Moctezuma

Tecate and Tecate Light are popular pale lagers named after the city of Tecate, Baja California, where they were first produced in 1943. Originally brewed by a local company, Tecate was acquired by Cuauhtémoc Moctezuma in 1955. Tecate is sold in both distinctive red and blue aluminium cans and in twist-top bottles. Tecate Light was launched in 1992 by Héctor Emilio Ayala, who was the project manager.

In 2013, Tecate Titanium, containing a greater amount of alcohol, was launched as a new product of the company. In 2019, Tecate Titanium, which contains 7.5% ABV, became available in a 24 oz. can. The campaign, "We Are Bold", targets males, specifically Hispanic C-store shoppers, according to Tecate Brand Director, Belen Pamukoff.

In 2017, Heineken announced that Tecate would be exported worldwide.

=== Other beers ===
- Heineken
- Amstel
- Affligem
- Kloster
- Canijilla
- Lagunitas
- Strongbow
- Ladron de Manzanas
- Miller
- Coors
- Moctezuma
- Noche Buena: Its name comes from the Spanish name of the poinsettia flower, commonly attached to the Christmas festivities. It is a bock styled seasonally brewed beer, usually sold from early October to late December.
- Sito de Kaiser
- Casta
- Superior: Once the flagship beer of the brewery. Its marketing slogan was "La rubia que todos quieren" ("The blonde that everyone loves").

== Advertising ==
=== Dos Equis ===
In 2007, Dos Equis inaugurated its "The Most Interesting Man in the World" advertising campaign.

The advertisements feature a bearded, debonair older gentleman (originally portrayed by actor Jonathan Goldsmith) with Frontline narrator Will Lyman conducting voiceovers. As Ottmar Liebert's "Barcelona Nights" plays in the background, the advertisements featured a montage of daring exploits involving "the most interesting man" when he was younger. The precise settings are never revealed, but he performs feats such as: freeing an angry bear from a painful-looking bear trap; shooting a pool trick shot before an audience; catching a marlin while cavorting in a Hemingway-esque scene with a young woman; winning an arm-wrestling match in a South American setting; surfing a rogue wave; and bench pressing two young women in a casino setting, each woman being seated in a chair.

In the commercial he says, "I don't always drink beer, but when I do, I prefer Dos Equis." Each commercial ends with the sign-off: "Stay thirsty, my friends."

After nearly a decade of being the mascot for the beer, Goldsmith's version of the character was sent on a one-way trip to Mars in a commercial. From September 2016, "The Most Interesting Man in the World" is a French actor named Augustin Legrand.

The campaign was ended in 2018, and replaced with a new campaign called "Keep It Interesante".

=== Tecate ===
Tecate beer has begun advertising heavily in the United States; initially in the Spanish-language media and more recently in the English-language media. Their tag lines are "Con Carácter" ("With Character") and "It's not beer, it's cerveza".

Tecate was the primary sponsor of Mexican race driver Adrián Fernández during his career in CART in the 1990s and early 2000s.

In the mid 2000s, Tecate became a major sponsor in boxing. It partnered with Golden Boy Promotions in 2006, then switched to Top Rank, then returned to Golden Boy in 2016, sponsoring TV Azteca and Solo boxeo shows, and signing world champions Manny Pacquiao and Canelo Álvarez.

In 2009, Tecate Light launched a television ad campaign targeted at the Mexican-American community, which features boxer Oscar de La Hoya and wrestler Rey Mysterio Jr. Also in 2009, Tecate announced a sponsorship agreement with ESPN sports.

In the 2007 movie Hellboy II: The Golden Army, Hellboy is shown drinking Tecate Light with Abraham Sapien and in a locker room with Krauss.

In the 2014 movie That Awkward Moment, with actors Zac Efron and Miles Teller, Efron's character is shown drinking Tecate with his friends in their New York apartment.

In 2015 a series of ads were recorded with the action actor Sylvester Stallone in his role of Rocky Balboa, in this campaign Rocky appears saying the phrase "Te hace falta ver más box" (In English You need to watch more boxing) in which he gives a cold stare to some men that are not acting so "manly" (e.g. listening to pop music or putting on too many clothes for cold weather). In the end Stallone says that "Somos box" ("We are box") while retired boxers are shown and "Eye of the tiger" from Survivor) is played. In Mexico the word is changed to Bax, as Stallone uses the American English pronunciation for the sport. At the end of the commercial, Rocky looks moved by the progress of the people he helped only to receive a cold stare from Stallone himself.

Stallone later led another Mexican ad campaign with soccer players and even his rival from Rocky IV, Dolph Lundgren, to help some Mexican fans to support the National Team in the World Cup 2018.

Tecate signed Mexican boxer Canelo Álvarez in 2016.

During the 2016 presidential election campaign, Tecate ran a television ad mocking Donald Trump's proposal to build a wall between the United States and Mexico. The "Tecate Beer Wall" is "a wall that brings us together, and it's going to be huge. You're welcome, America".

In February 2020, the new campaign, "Mexico Is in Us" was launched. While the brand is moving away from "macho marketing" campaigns, it remains unapologetically, a Mexican-American beer.

== Football teams sponsored ==
=== Liga MX ===
- C.F. Monterrey (Tecate)
- Tigres UANL (Tecate)

== Image gallery ==
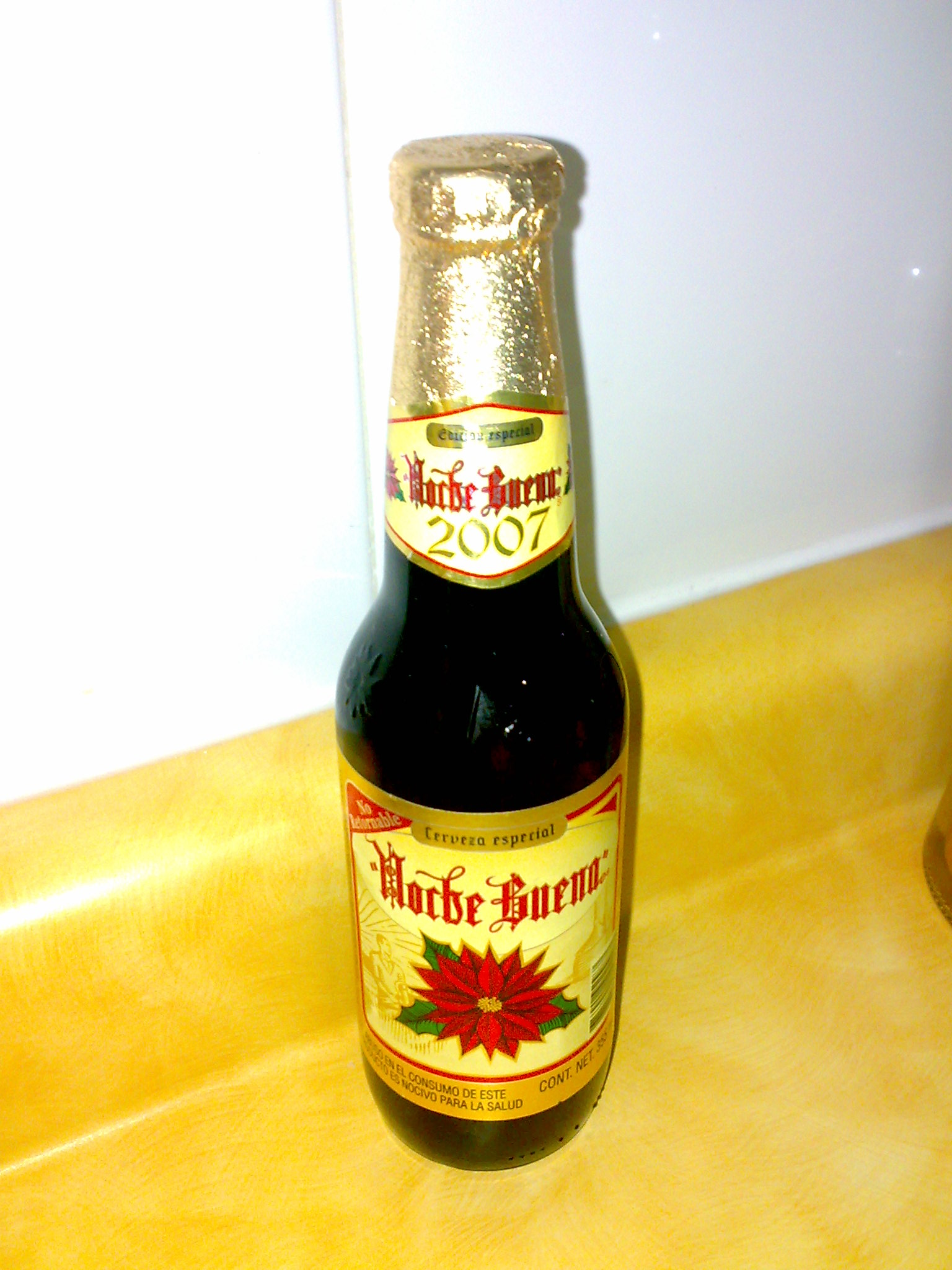
Noche Buena beer, showing the Noche Buena (Poinsettia) and a volume of 355 ml (12.0 U.S. fl oz; 12.5 imp fl oz) on the label.

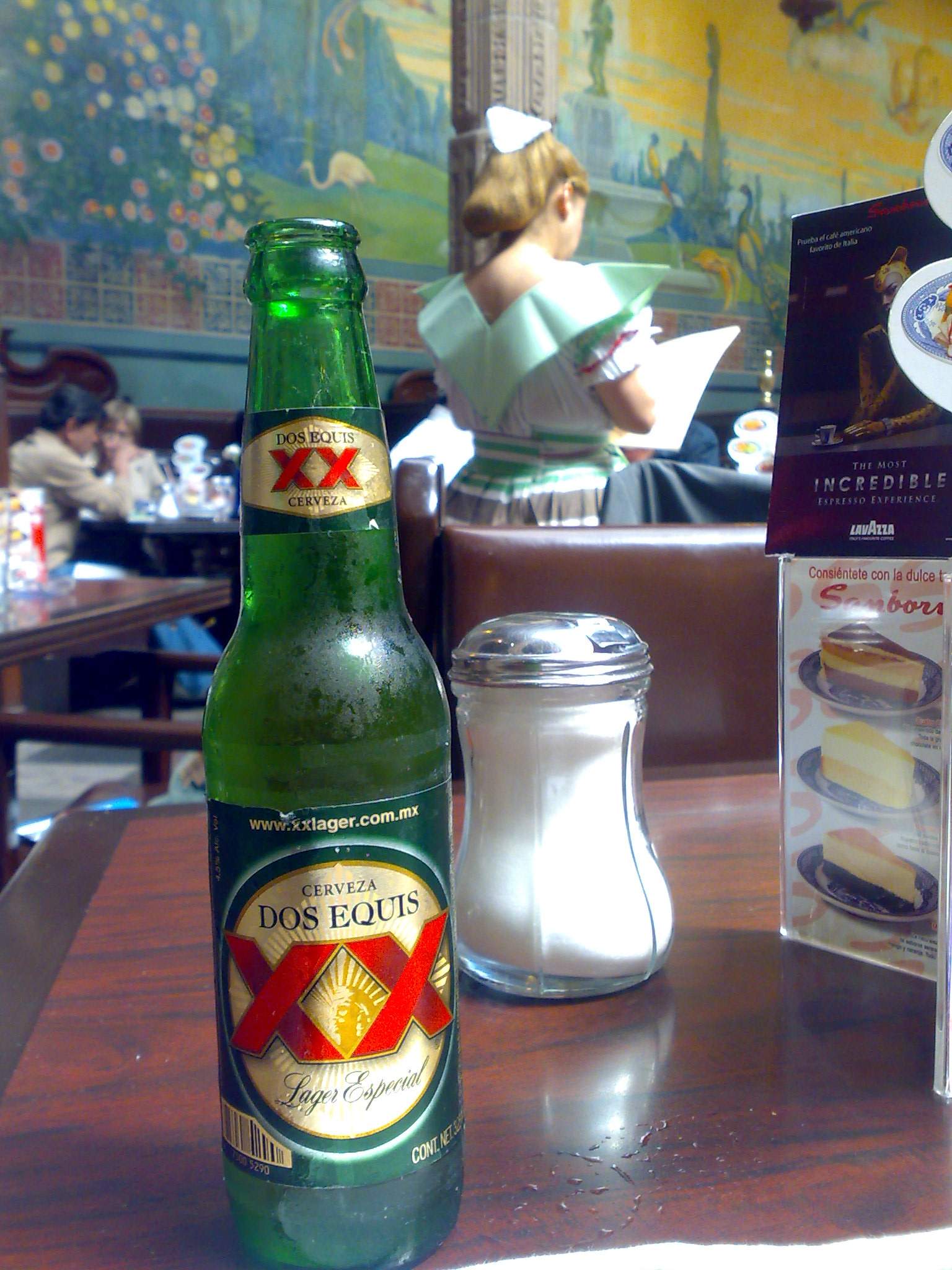
Dos Equis (XX)

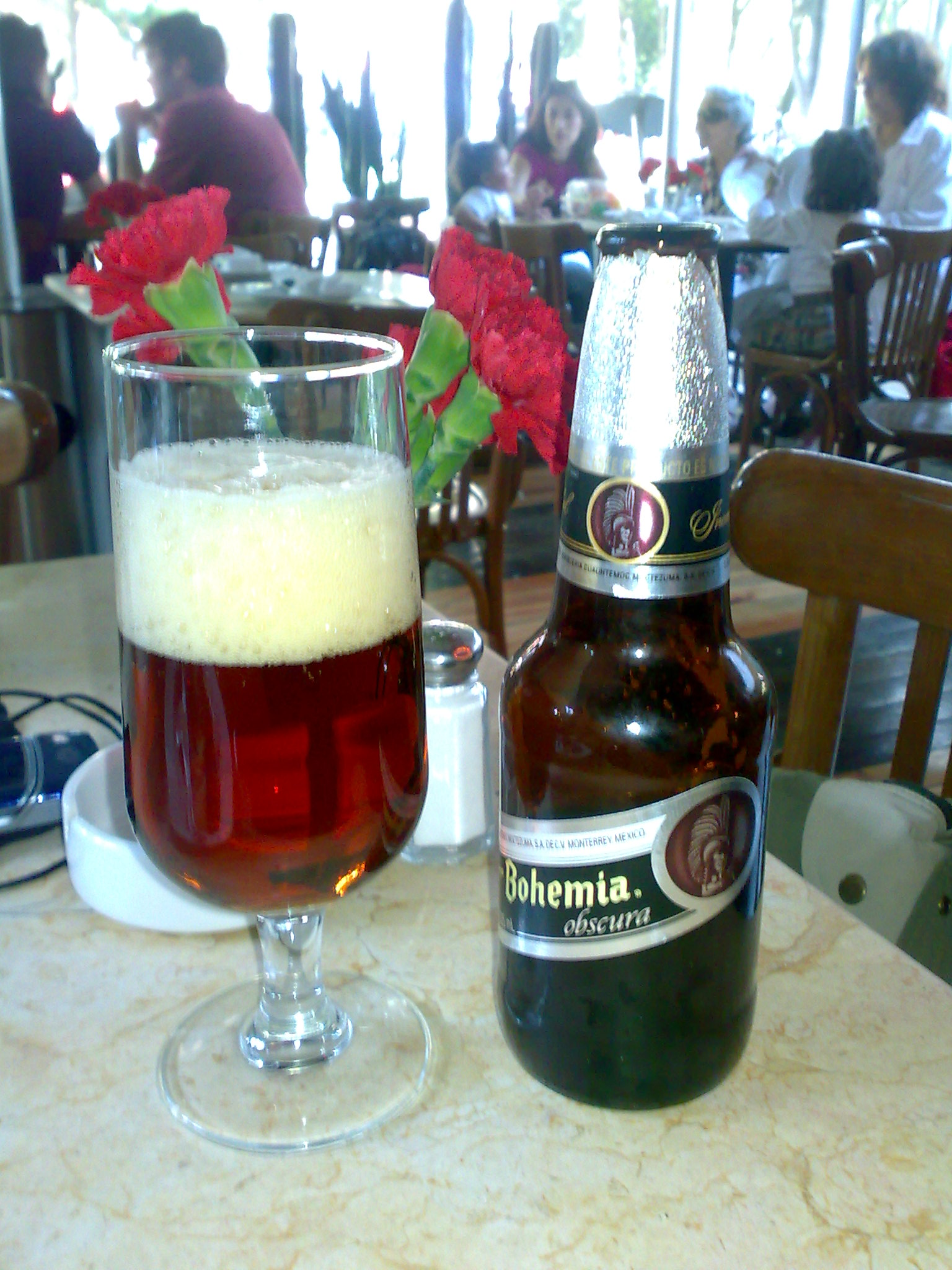
Bohemia beer

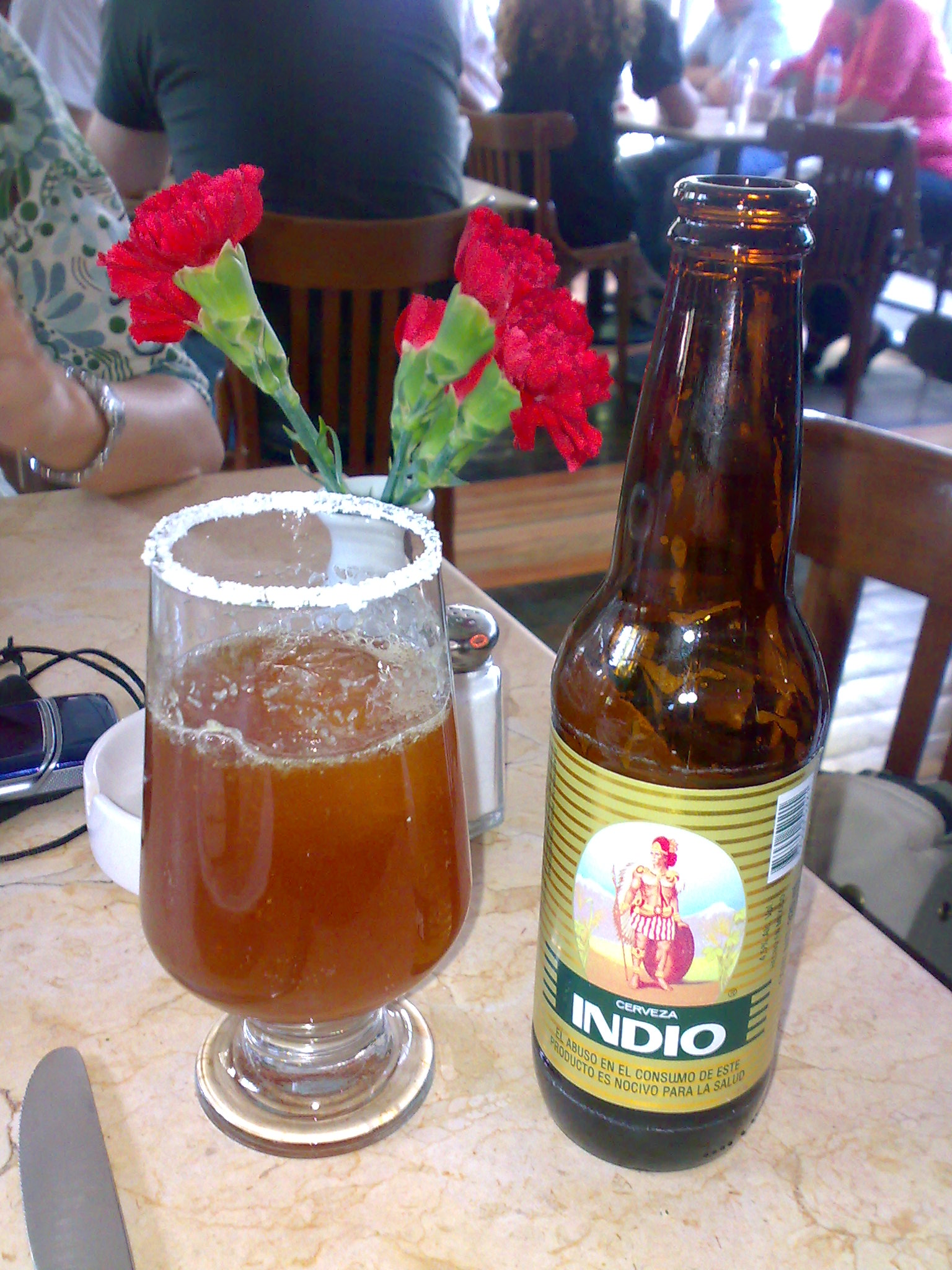
Michelada and Cerveza Indio
