= Valora =

Valora may refer to:

- Valora (company), a Swiss retail and food service holding company
- Valora, currency unit in the unrecognized micronation Republic of Molossia
- Valora Noland (1941–2022), American actress
