= Yoli =

Lime soda produced in Mexico

Yoli is a lime soda produced in Mexico. A regional drink, until recently it was only available in the state of Guerrero and surrounding areas.

Yoli was first produced in Taxco, Guerrero by the bottling company Grupo Yoli in 1918. At the time, the bottling company was known as "La Vencedora". Yoli was the first soda drink the company made, and it became locally popular in the region. Its popularity continued to expand as Grupo Yoli was granted its first Coca-Cola bottling franchise in 1938, located in Acapulco. It has been described as a less watery version of Sprite.

The soda became available in the Toluca and Cuernavaca markets in December 2008. The brand was previously under the care by Grupo Yoli, a Coca-Cola bottling company in Guerrero. In 2008, Yoli was acquired by FEMSA in January 2013. The merger in turn allowed the Grupo Yoli bottling plants to bottle Coca-Cola Company brand sodas, such as Coca-Cola and Fanta. This purchase was successfully completed in May 2013, and allowed for Coca-Cola FEMSA to produce the Yoli soda, which was formerly the trademark beverage of Grupo Yoli. After the purchase, FEMSA was able to expand the beverage's popularity into neighboring areas.

Yoli is currently produced by 2 bottling facilities operated by Grupo Yoli.
