= Percy S. Cox =

American photographer

Percy Smith Cox (circa 1872 – February 24, 1911) was an American photographer who worked in pre-revolutionary Mexico at the beginning of the twentieth century.

== Personal life ==
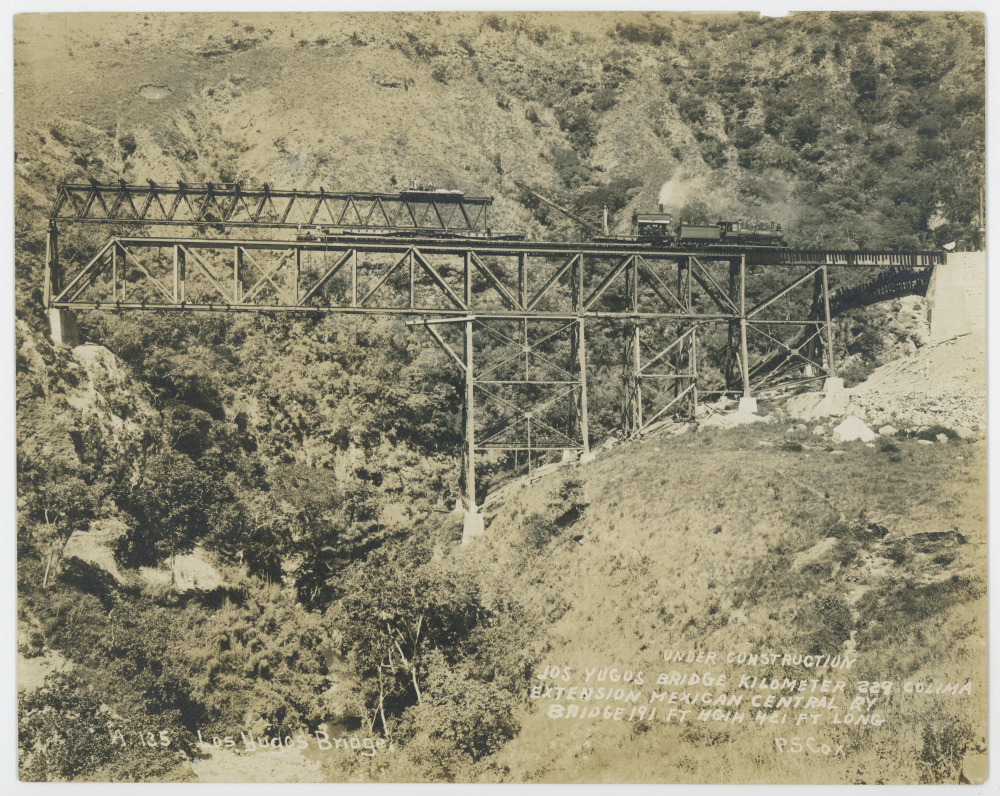
Los Yugos Bridge, DeGolyer Library, Southern Methodist University

Born circa 1872 in Pennsylvania, Cox was the youngest of three sons of John William (a farmer) and Mary F. Cox. The family moved to the Escondido region (Twin Oaks) of California where Cox began working as a photographer by 1893. From 1896 to 1898, Cox attended Pomona College.

By 1899, Cox was working in Mexico City as a photographer; in October of that year, he was joined there in business by fellow San Diegan Ralph J. Carmichael, setting up a photography studio as Cox and Carmichael. Cox sold his interest in the studio in early 1902 and returned to the United States suffering from altitude sickness. In 1903, Cox married school teacher Mary Peter in Pasadena. Cox and his wife moved to Mexico City in 1904, and the next year Cox and partners A. C. Moore, J. Duncan Gleason, and John S. Turner (all from Los Angeles) established the American Printing and Engraving Company there. Cox continued to work in Mexico through 1909, but returned to Escondido in late 1909, again suffering from the effects of Mexico City's high altitude. He sold his photo-engraving business in Mexico City to the owners of the Mexican Herald, and apparently abandoned his career as a photographer. In 1910, he opened a dealership in San Diego selling Lane steamer automobiles, then worked in the photographic supply business in Los Angeles. Cox died suddenly on February 24, 1911 in Pomona.

== Work ==
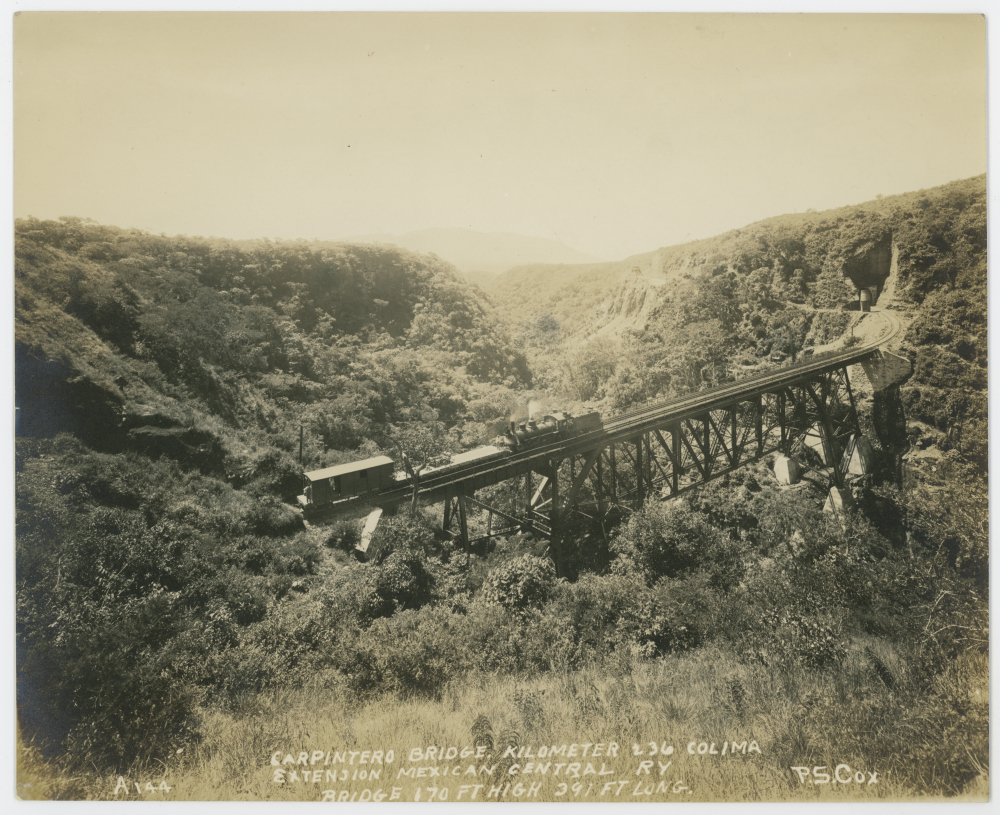
Carpintero Bridge. Kilometer 236 Colima, DeGolyer Library, Southern Methodist University

Cox was among a group of expatriate photographers (such as fellow San Diegans Carmichael and C. B. Waite) working in Mexico in the first decade of the 20th century, chronicling industrialization and social conditions. Cox's subjects included railroads, bridges, mines, and landscapes. His works illustrated magazine articles, and books, and were reproduced as postcards.

Many of Cox's photographs are included in collections such as the Eugene P. Lyle, Jr. Photographs, University of Oregon; the DeGolyer Library, Southern Methodist University; and the California Border Region Digitization Project of the San Diego History Center. Works by Cox & Carmichael are included in the Collection of Southern California and Mexico Photographs of the Huntington Library. Many also appear in published works.

While Cox was considered a fine photographer by contemporaries, recent criticism has focused on Cox's work as representative of American cultural imperialism in Mexico.

A number of Cox's photographs have been attributed incorrectly to Percy B[oxley] Cox (1875–1946).
