= Estrella Azul =

Panamanian dairy products brand

Estrella Azul is a Panamanian dairy products brand. The brand was once partly owned by American soda company Coca-Cola.

== History ==
Estrella Azul and the brand's parent company, Industrias Lácteas, S.A., were both founded in 1956, the result of a union of Panamanian dairy-producing families.

In 1973, the Estrella Azul brand expanded to include yogurts.

In 2018, Estrella Azul announced to Panamanian grade-A milk producers that it was not going to keep buying milk from them. As a consequence, their competitor, Productos Nevada, announced that they would buy 240,000 additional liters of milk a month from those producers affected. Later on, Estrella Azul announced it was temporarily suspending the cutting of buying grade-A milk.

During 2020, it was announced that Honduran dairy products company Lacthosa was interested in buying Estrella Azul. That same year, Coca-Cola FEMSA decided to sell their percentage of Estrella Azul. Coca-Cola's percentage of Estrella Azul and its parent company were sold to Panama Dairy Ventures, which then became the only owners of Estrella Azul.

During 2021, Estrella Azul's workers went on strike.

Troubles loomed for the brand again in 2022 when more than 1,000 Industrias Lácteas S.A. workers threatened to go on strike again; this time, the strike was, however, averted when negotiations between the company's workers' union (SITEFA) and the company's negotiators team were successful, after mediation by Panama's Work and Labor Development Ministry (MITRADEL).

During 2023, Estrella Azul announced that their dairy plants were at full capacity, and that due to that, their Chiriqui plant would not be able to receive any more milks.
