= Eugenio Garza Sada =

Mexican philanthropist and industrialist

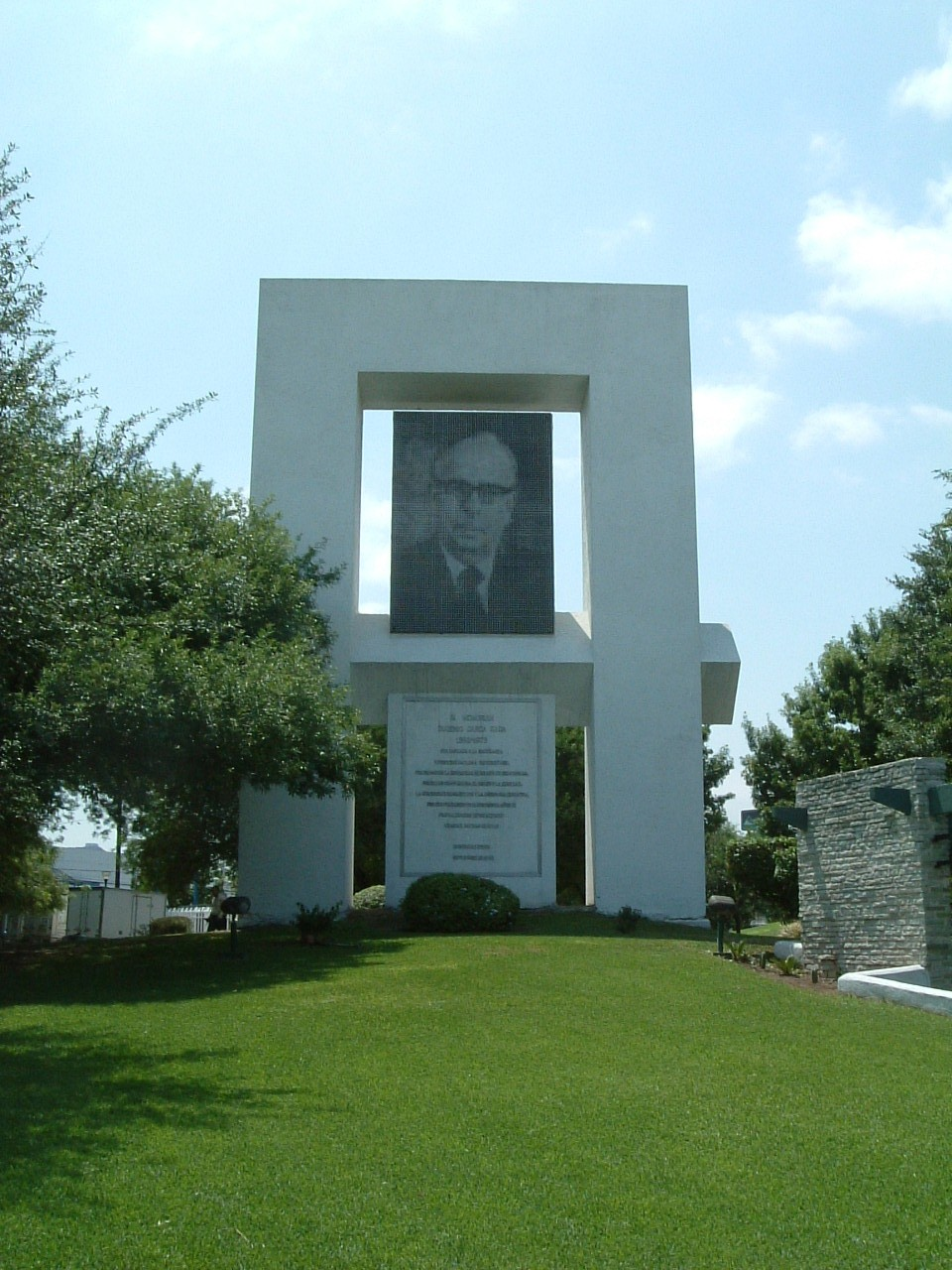
- Memorial to Garza Sada at the Monterrey campus
- Born: January 11, 1892
- Died: September 17, 1973 (aged 81)
- Occupation(s): Businessman, philanthropist
- Known for: Founder, Monterrey Institute of Technology and Higher Education

Eugenio Garza Sada (January 11, 1892 – September 17, 1973) was an industrialist in the city of Monterrey, Mexico, best known for founding the Instituto Tecnologico y de Estudios Superiores de Monterrey (ITESM) school system in the country. Garza was born into a business family, with his father founding the Cuauhtémoc Brewery in Monterrey in 1890. After Garza graduated from the Massachusetts Institute of Technology (MIT), he began to work at the brewery, working his way up in the company to eventually take over as director after his father died. Garza and his brother Roberto grew the company into a conglomerate and instituted various innovations including benefits and social services for employees. Garza's inspiration for founding ITESM came from his experience at MIT, as well as the desire to decrease Mexico's dependence on foreign expert help. He remained the head of ITESM's board until his death in 1973, as a result of a failed kidnapping attempt.

== Life ==
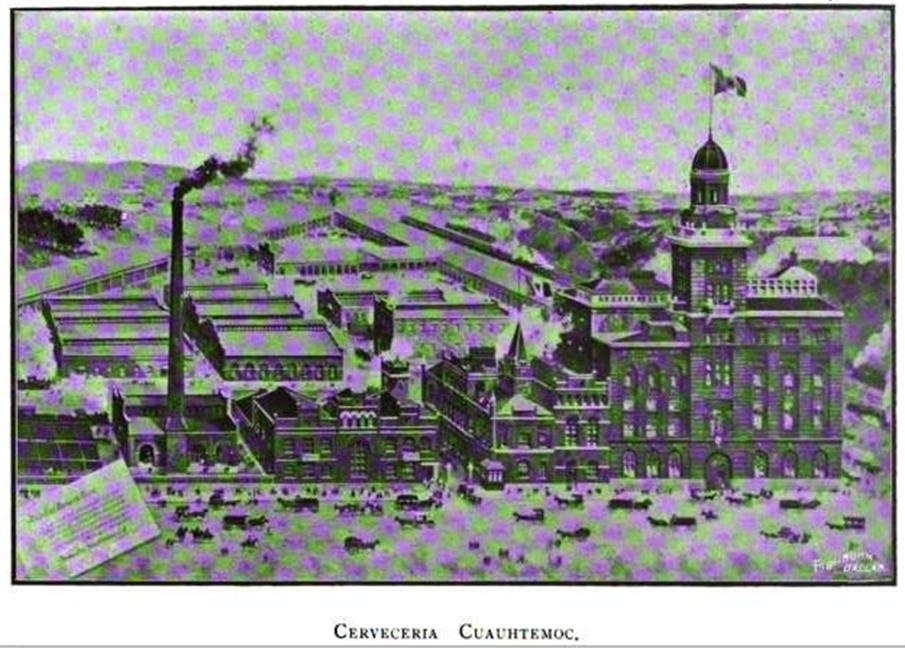
Cuauhtémoc Brewery founded by Garza's father

Eugenio Garza Sada was born on January 11, 1892, in Monterrey, Mexico. He was the fourth of children of Isaac Garza Garza and Consuelo Sada Muguerza de Sada. Both parents came from highly influential business families. His paternal grandfather, Juan de la Garza Martinez, was mayor of Monterrey in the mid 19th century, building the Templo del Roble church in 1853. His father founded the Cuauhtémoc Brewery along with José Calderón Muguerza in 1890 with the help of foreign capital. His birth and early upbringing coincided with the industrialization that was taking place under the Porfirio Díaz regime at the end of the 19th century and very early 20th.

Garza's upbringing was religious and conservative, initially attending Marist schools. It also revolved around the brewery business, visiting his father at the plant often. He attended primary school at the Colegio de San Juan in Saltillo, Coahuila, two hours away from the family home. He attended middle school in Monterrey at the Colegio Hidalgo. Their religious background also led the family to a history of philanthropy, especially supporting hospices such as Melitón Villareal and León Ortigosa in Monterrey, which Eugenio continued later in his life. In 1909, Monterrey experienced severe flooding. The Garza house, which survived, became a shelter for the homeless and the company helped with reconstruction efforts.

This disaster was followed shortly after by the Mexican Revolution, which required the family to leave Mexico in 1913 and seek asylum in the United States, living in Brownsville and St. Louis. He continued high school and graduated from Western Military Academy, a military academy in Alton, Illinois. He then went to the Massachusetts Institute of Technology, obtaining a bachelor's degree in civil engineering in 1916. Along with going to school, Eugenio worked as a store clerk and an usher in a theater. During the war, the family house survived but not the original brewery which was destroyed or left in disrepair. Although the family continued to regain control of their properties, Garza's father felt it was best that Eugenio and his younger brother Roberto continue their education in the United States, not only because of the advanced technology but also because there was more order there. This experience left an impression that would later lead to the formation of the Monterrey Institute of Technology and Higher Education.

In 1917, he returned to Mexico with his brother Roberto and both began working to rebuild the Cuauhtémoc Brewery, which the family had recovered. However, despite being the son of one of the principal founders and an MIT graduate, he was relegated to an inferior position and had to work his way up.

In 1921, he married Consuelo Lagüera Zambrano. The couple had eight children. Garza's career was focused on the brewery, which he eventually directed and grew into a conglomerate called Grupo Valores Industriales, S.A. He is considered to be one of the most responsible for the growth of the state of Nuevo León in the 20th century. Most of what he founded still remains. However, he is best known as the founder of the Monterrey Institute of Technology and Higher Education, a private high school/university system in Mexico. He was described as modest, austere, frugal and of few words by various people, including his children. Although he was a millionaire, he rode in an antique car, had only three suits in his closet, all the same cut and color and generally wore cheaper shoes. He reinvested his money rather than spend it on lavish things. His hobbies were gardening and music.

== Career at Cuauhtémoc Brewery ==
Garza's career was dedicated to the economic development of the city of Monterrey, starting from his family's Cuauhtémoc Brewery. After graduating college, he began to work at the company as an assistant in the sales department, having to work his way up. He and his brother introduced the use of carbonation to increase the head, the use of cardboard cases instead of wood and steel barrels instead of wood. The brothers also worked to diversify the company getting into the production of raw materials and packaging, changing the name to Grupo Monterrey. In World War II, the United States began to ration tin, a material that the company imported. In response, Grupo Monterrey began a new company called Hojalata y Lámina, S.A. to produce its own cans and bottles. After his father died, the family decided that Eugenio should take over directorship. The company continued to grow and diversify under Garza, changing name again to Grupo Valores Industriales, S.A. (VISA). At the time of his death in 1973, the enterprise consisted of Cuauhtémoc, Fábricas de Monterrey (founded 1920), Malta, S.A.(1929), Empaques de Cartón Titán (1936), Hojalata y Lámina, S.A. (HYLSA 1942), Grafo Regia, S.A. (1957), and Cevecería Cuauhtémoc Toluca (1969) created by Garza and his brother as well as companies bought by the group including Cevecería Central in 1929, Cervecería Oeste in 1933, Cevecería Tecate, Cevecería Humaya in 1954 and Cevecería Cruz Blanca (1965).

Along with technological and administrative innovations, Garza also implemented social ones. One of his innovations in business was to form an internal communications system, which at the time was a novelty. This included a publication called "El abanderado" and later "Trabajo y ahorro" which began in 1918 and published twice a month. He also wrote regular bulletins for workers at the factories he managed. He also developed the "Ideario Cuauhtémoc, a set of seventeen principles set for both the company and its employees, a predecessor to codes of ethics. Concepts in the ideario included "respect for others," "control of temperament" and "Not mock others." This document was not only distributed to employees but also posted prominently in production areas and offices.

Garza and his brother continued and expanded on policies of his father in regards to worker welfare, providing social service and other benefits as well as cutting the work day down from the normal twelve hours to nine. One reason behind this was the family's experience with the Mexican Revolution. Working for the welfare of their employees helped to foster loyalty to the company.

Two years after starting work with the company, the two brothers began the Sociedad Cuauhtémoc y Famosa, open to workers and managers of the enterprise. The organization offered health care services, courses to employees, scholarships for their children and a recreational center. In 1957, this organization created the Colonia Cuauhtémoc, a housing development for workers with subsidized mortgages offered by the company, which resulted in 334 homes over forty hectares. The inauguration of the project was attended by Mexican president Adolfo Ruiz Cortines. The project led to the creation of a program to help finance worker home construction which was reorganized in 1972 as the Patrimonio de Vivienda del Grupo Industrial. As part of the Sociedad Cuauhtémoc y Famosa, he established the radio station XET as well as Televisión Independiente de México. The latter eventually merged with another television company to form Televisa after Garza's death. However, these activities were criticized as a kind of "white syndicate" (sindicato blanco) aimed at controlling workers and containing unionism.

In business he believed that authority should be centralized and clearly defined. Garza maintained the Monterrey tradition of an industrial class in which families maintained control of industry by handing down key roles through the generations. He felt that honest work brought men to liberty and culture. For him it gave humans dignity. He felt that one of his social obligations as a businessman was to create as many jobs as possible. He is quoted as saying "I do not distribute riches: I distribute jobs. In this way, you will raise the standard of living of the people."

He was not politically involved, believing more in economic development for Mexico's problems than social or political ones. He rejected state intervention in the affairs of private companies. His conservative and authoritarian views put him at odds with many by the end of the 1960s, including students, especially after the 1968 Tlatelolco massacre. His belief in keeping government out of business also put him at odds with Mexican president Luis Echeverría, but it was not public. Politically motivated businessmen allied with Echeverría were interested in a control over the Cadena García Valseca, which published thirty seven local newspapers in Mexico. Garza was against this move on economic and political grounds and offered the publishing group financing to stay solvent and resist takeovers by those sympathetic to the government. However, Garza died before the transaction took place.

== Tec de Monterrey ==
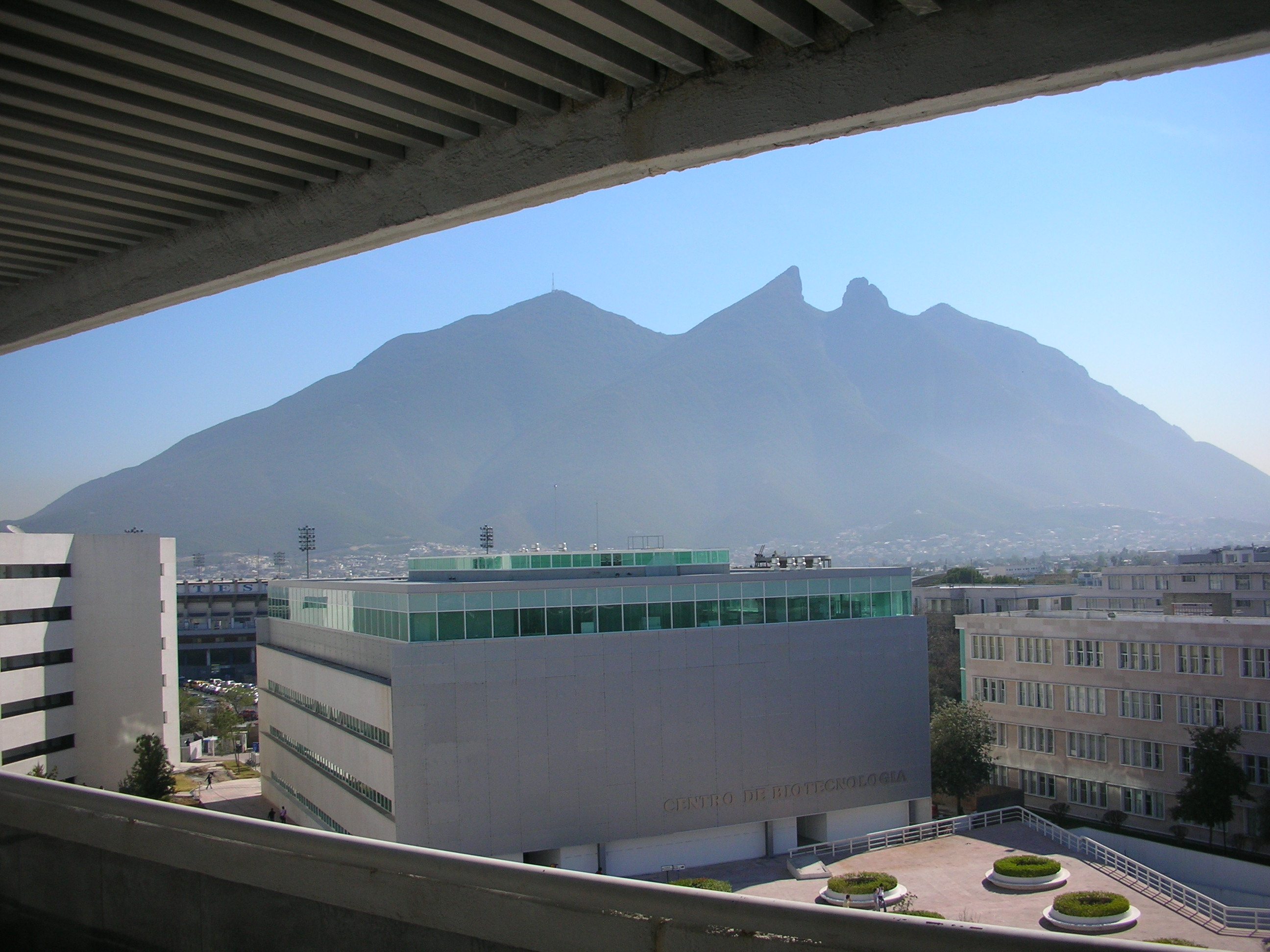
The Femsa Biotechnology Center at the Monterrey Institute of Technology, Monterrey

Garza is considered to be one of Mexico's second generation of industrialists, mostly distinguished from their Porfirian era predecessors by having a formal education. Garza founded the Monterrey Institute of Technology and Higher Education with the aim of forming highly qualified administrators and technical workers in Mexico, decreasing Mexican businesses' dependency of foreign experts. His first project in this area was the creation of the Escuela Politécnica Cuauhtémoc, which provided elementary and high school education along with technical skills. The need for a university level institution seemed more urgent with the outbreak of World War II among countries that normally provided expertise in Mexico. Another issue was that the state and federal authorities refounded the University of Nuevo León, but there were political conflicts in its operation, which Garza wanted to avoid. Garza's experience at MIT was the basis for the organization of the Monterrey Institute of Technology and Higher Education, originally named Enseñanza e Investigación Superior, A.C. which he founded along with a group of Monterrey businessmen. It began in a house in the center of Monterrey in 1943, with 350 students and a number of professors. The federal government publicly declared that it would respect private educational initiatives, which was crucial for certification purposes and the organization's incorporation as a civil association.

He called the school "his ninth child." From that point on, he dedicated a significant amount of his time to the institution, being president of the board from 1943 until his death. Like he did for Cuauhtémoc, he created bulletins and other communications for the school as well as student newspapers. However, he did not permit political activism on the campus believing that the school should not be antagonistic to the government. However, this had the effect of alienating a good part of the student population and it also led to conflicts with the more liberal administrators. At the end of the 20th century, the school system had more than 80,000 students at the undergraduate and graduate levels.

== Death ==
On the morning of September 17, 1973, Garza was on his way to work. At a red light in Monterrey, his car was blocked by another. Two young men got out and a struggle ensued. Garza's driver and assistant were killed, as was Garza as he reached for his pistol. Two of the men were also killed, identified as Javier Rodriguez Torres and Hilario Juarez Garcia. It was a failed kidnapping attempt organized by the guerrilla Liga Comunista 23 de Septiembre.

Garza's funeral was attended by over 200,000 people, including the then President Luis Echeverría. He was buried at the Panteón del Carmen in Monterrey.

An investigation in 2011 by the Excélsior newspaper into government records at the time showed that the Echeverría administration was aware of a plot by the group to kidnap Garza for a year and a half before it occurred but did not take action.

== Eugenio Garza Sada Award ==
The Eugenio Garza Sada Award was created in the memory of Garza to preserve his values and ideas. This award is financed by FEMSA, the holding company of the Cuauhtémoc Moctezuma Brewery, and by the Monterrey Institute of Technology.

== Bibliography ==
- Ortiz Rivera, Alicia (2011). Eugenio Garza Sada (in Spanish). Mexico City: Planeta DeAgostini. ISBN 978-970-726-095-5.
