= Monterrey Foundry =

Defunct Mexican iron and steel foundry

Fundidora de Fierro y Acero de Monterrey, S.A.
- Trade name: Fundidora Monterrey
- Type: Public company
- Industry: Ferrous metallurgy
- Founded: 1900; 126 years ago Monterrey, Mexico.
- Founders: Vicente Ferrara; Antonio Basagoiti Arteta; Eugene Kelly; Leon Signoret
- Defunct: May 9, 1986; 40 years ago
- Fate: Liquidation
- Headquarters: Monterrey, Mexico
- Area served: Latin America
- Products: Iron; Steel; Coke; Slag
- Number of employees: 7,000 (1986)

The Monterrey Foundry (In Spanish: Fundidora de Fierro y Acero de Monterrey, S.A.) was a Mexican iron and steel foundry founded in 1900 in the city of Monterrey, becoming the first such foundry in Latin America and, for many years, the most important one in the region.

At the end of the 19th century, Vicente Ferrara, aware of the existence of numerous iron and coal deposits in the surroundings of Monterrey, and having obtained experience working in steel foundries in the United States, saw the opportunity to found a similar company in Monterrey. To carry out his vision, he gained the support of an international consortium of entrepreneurs, including Antonio Basagoiti (Spain), Eugene Kelly (US), and Leon Signoret (France). As a capital-intensive industry, the enterprise also required significant investments from some of the wealthiest families of the industrialized north of Mexico at the turn of the twentieth century, including the Milmo, Madero, and Garza-Sada clans. Foreign capitalists, including the Guggenheims, also participated to a more limited extent.

The company was successful during the first half of the twentieth century. Many significant engineering projects in Latin America were built with structural steel produced by the Monterrey Foundry. This included Torre Latinoamericana, the world's first major skyscraper successfully built on highly active seismic zone.

After many years in private hands, the firm was nationalized by the Mexican government in 1977 and remained operated by the public sector until its bankruptcy in May 1986. Today, the old site of the foundry has become Fundidora Park. For 60 years it was dedicated exclusively to the production of non-flat iron and steel articles, such as railways, wire rods, corrugated rods, structural steel, and train wheels, among others.
