= Ditsch =

German chain of pretzel bars

Brezelbäckerei Ditsch GmbH
- Industry: Snack bars
- Founded: 1919; 107 years ago in Mainz, Germany
- Founder: Wilhelm Ditsch
- Area served: Germany
- Products: Pretzels, croissants, pizza snacks
- Website: http://www.ditsch.de/en

Ditsch is a German chain of pretzel bars also selling croissants and pizza snacks. It operates approximately 200 outlets in Germany, but over the 2010s, it also traded in the United Kingdom with up to 13 outlets there at its height. Since 2012, Ditsch has been part of the Valora group.

== History ==
In 1919, master baker Wilhelm Ditsch founded a bakery shop in Mainz.

The founder’s son, Heinz Ditsch, also a master baker, took the bakery into its second generation. He perfected his father’s recipe, and soon Ditsch pretzels were famous well beyond the borders of Mainz. In order to meet the growing demand, “Pretzelmen” in white clothing walked around Mainz, offering fresh pretzels in baskets in the streets and restaurants. In the mid-1970s, Heinz Ditsch specialised in the manufacture of his very successful pretzel pastries.

His son, Peter Ditsch, grew up knowing about his father’s business activities. The qualified businessman took over his parents’ company in the third generation. He realised the trend towards outdoor consumption and fast food.

The administration of this family business, which today has more than 400 employees, is based in Mainz, next to their first production facility. A further production site in Oranienbaum (Saxony-Anhalt) was built in 1999.

Ditsch now has around 200 outlets in Germany, mainly in railway stations, shopping centers and pedestrian zones.
