= José A. Muguerza =

Mexican entrepreneur and philanthropist

José Ambrosio Muguerza Crespo (December 7, 1858 – March 14, 1939) was a Mexican born entrepreneur and philanthropist.

In 1934, Meguerza founded the Muguerza Hospital, in Monterrey. Over the next decades, the Catholic, not-for-profit Muguerza Group added hospitals in Monterrey, Puebla, Chihuahua and Reynosa. In April 2001, Muguerza Group partnered with Christus Health, a like-minded organization based in the United States, to form the Christus Muguerza Group alliance, the largest healthcare system in northern Mexico.

Muguerza has also been a founder and/or board member of other Mexican enterprises, including Cervecería Cuauhtémoc, Banco Mercantil de Monterrey, Cementos Mexicanos, Compañía Fundidora de Fierro y Acero de Monterrey and Junta de la Unión Regional Nuevoleonesa.
