= First Commerce Bancshares =

First Commerce Bancshares Inc. was a banking company whose main subsidiary, National Bank of Commerce (NBC), was the largest bank in Lincoln, Nebraska. On July 17, 2000, First Commerce's banks became part of Wells Fargo Bank. At the time First Commerce had about 1,400 employees and $2.3 billion in assets. National Bank of Commerce had $1.5 billion in assets. Other units of First Commerce included a mortgage company, an asset management company, and NBC/Computer Services Corporation.

== Banks ==
- National Bank of Commerce, Lincoln
- Western Nebraska National Bank, North Platte
- First National Bank & Trust Co., Kearney
- The Overland National Bank, Grand Island
- The First National Bank of McCook
- The First National Bank of West Point
- Western Nebraska National Bank, Valentine
- City National Bank & Trust, Hastings

== History ==
Morris Weil moved from France to the United States in 1875 at age 17. After starting the Lincoln Paint and Color Company in 1892, he started the state-chartered The Bank of Commerce in 1902 with $50,000 in capital. Weil served as president until his death 43 years later, though he had started the bank for his son Carl who worked in another bank in town.

During the Panic of 1907, while many banks failed, Weil's skill kept The Bank of Commerce going. Weil eventually sought a national charter led to a series of agricultural crises. Yet under Weil's leadership, and the name of the bank changed to The National Bank of Commerce of Lincoln.

One of the keys to Weil's success was Weil's ability to visit and advise small community banks around the state of Nebraska. In addition, about half of his deposits came from the very banks he visited. Weil also attracted many of the businesses operating in Lincoln.

National Bank of Commerce added one of Nebraska's first savings departments in 1911, By 1924, the bank had grown so much that it needed a new headquarters, and a six-story building went up at 13th and O streets. National Bank of Commerce survived the Great Depression, one of the few banks to do so.

In 1945, Byron Dunn, a bank employee since he was 17 years old in 1905, replaced Weil after his death. In the 1920s, Dunn had visited Colorado in order to collect on cattle loans, which National Bank of Commerce had arranged through a bank in Denver. After that bank went under, Dunn and a group of cowboys rounded up cattle, though in some cases other banks claimed the cattle did not belong to National Bank of Commerce. Still, Dunn had determination and the most cowboys, and his bank collected most of the cattle.

Under Dunn, National Bank of Commerce became "a full-service financial services facility". He added more advertising, improved the bank's appearance, added charge accounts, and had checks printed in Braille. Dunn also became involved in the community, helped to start an employee newspaper, and built a lodge in South Bend. Dunn retired in 1961 with his bank over $80 million in deposits.

Glenn Max Yaussi, who started as a $55 a month employee in 1934, succeeded Dunn. Yaussi recognized the need for new procedures and hired consultants. He also arranged a merger with Lincoln's First Trust Company, one of the top trust companies in the state, adding a mortgage department and a farm management department.

In 1964, National Bank of Commerce significantly increased deposits by offering one of the highest savings interest rates in the country. That same year, the bank bought a computer for its accounting and became one of the first banks in the region to computerize its operations, subsequently providing computer services to other banks.

In 1967, Paul Amen succeeded Yaussi, who became chairman and CEO. In 1968, National Bank of Commerce joined with other banks to offer a Master Charge credit card through MidAmerica Bankcard Association. That same year, the bank began offering travel services.

In 1972, National Bank of Commerce took over Mutual Savings Company of Lincoln, which had nearly $1 million in assets but grew to $23 million five years later. The next year, the bank added Nebraska Savings Company of Scottsbluff. Also during the 1970s, the bank took over the bond underwriter Robert E. Schweser Company, Inc. and started NBC Leasing Company. National Bank of Commerce also built a new 12-story headquarters.

James Stuart Jr., who came to National Bank of Commerce from Citibank, became president in the 1980s and began an affiliate system. The bank holding company First Commerce Bancshares was incorporated in 1985.

During the 1990s, NBC/Computer Software services had 284 banks as customers. First Commerce Mortgage Company had $10 million in new mortgages in 1993. Also, the BankCard Services division had 90,000 credit cards with $78 million in outstanding credit.

Early in 2000, the purchase of First Commerce Bancshares by Wells Fargo was announced. To complete the deal, First Commerce had to sell City National to Heritage Bank of Aurora because Wells Fargo would have had two-thirds of the market in Hastings, more than allowed by federal law. National Bank of Commerce sold a Lincoln branch to Pinnacle Bancorp.

The deal gave Wells Fargo over $4 billion in assets in Nebraska, more than twice what the bank had before. Wells Fargo had 900 employees in the state.
