= Valora (company) =

Swiss food and retail holding company

Valora Group
- Type: Public (parent company Valora Holding AG traded under VALN)
- Industry: Retail, Food Services, Press, Books
- Founded: 1905 / 1986 (Holding)
- Headquarters: Valora Holding AG in Muttenz, Switzerland (Basel-Landschaft)
- Key people: Michael Mueller (CEO); Sascha Zahnd (Chairman); Beat Fellmann (CFO)
- Products: Kiosk and convenience products, coffee, press
- Revenue: 2.23 billion CHF (2021)
- Owner: FEMSA (97.77%); Others (2.23%)
- Number of employees: 3'618 FTE (2021)
- Website: www.valora.com

Valora is a Swiss retail and food service holding company. The company was acquired on 7 October 2022 by FEMSA.

== History ==
Valora goes back to the Schweizer Chocoladen & Colonialhaus, which was founded in Olten, Switzerland in 1905, which later became known as Merkur AG. The company was initially created to sell coffee and chocolate.

In 1986, Merkur AG was made into a holding company, Merkur Holding AG, and in 1996, the company was renamed to today's Valora Holding AG.

In 2009, Valora generated 3 billion Swiss francs in turnover and employed 6,500 staff (on a full-time equivalent basis).

Valora Trade took over Engelschiøn Marwell Hauge AS (EMH) in 2010 and thus opened up the sales and distribution of cosmetic products in Norway. In 2011, Valora Trade took over Scandinavian Cosmetics (ScanCo) and thus acquired access to cosmetic distribution in Sweden.

In 2012, Valora has acquired the Ditsch / Brezelkönig group of companies, a nationwide chain of pretzel stores, for 100 million euros. In October 2013, Michael Müller was named CEO of the group.

In 2014, Valora sold Valora Services to Thomas Kirschner, the majority shareholder of Presse-Vertriebs-Gesellschaft. On the other hand, the small-scale retailer Naville in French-speaking Switzerland was acquired.

In 2015, Valora was preparing to launch consumer loans available throughout its network of kiosques. The company completed the sale of its Trade division to Aurelius Group.

In 2017, Valora acquired the franchise business BackWerk based in Germany as well as the pretzel producer Pretzel Baron in the US.

In 2019, the company launched the autonomous, cashier-free convenience store avec box at Zurich main station.

In mid-2021, Valora announced a collaboration with Moveri and the takeover of the operation of 39 service station stores with its avec format. At the end of the year, Valora acquired the German snack professional Back-Factory and announced the rollout of around 300 k kiosk vending machines throughout Switzerland by the end of 2022.

In June 2022, Valora strengthened its collaboration with Oel-Pool / Moveri and announced the conversion of another 71 of the service station shops into avec stores. In July 2022, Valora acquired Frittenwerk, a trendy format based in Germany.

In 2022, Fomento Económico Mexicano (FEMSA) announced an acquisition of Valora for up to $1.2bn. The acquisition was completed on 7 October 2022.

== Description ==
The Valora Group comprises the two divisions Retail and Food Service. The former includes the formats k kiosk, avec, Press & Books, cigo, ServiceStore DB und U-Store formats. The Food Service division comprises the formats BackWerk, Ditsch, Brezelkönig, Caffè Spettacolo, Frittenwerk and SuperGuud. The company also includes own brands such as ok.– and bob Finance as well as the in-house pretzel production. Valora's around 2,700 small-scale points of sale of Valora are located at highly frequented locations in Switzerland, Germany, Austria, Luxembourg and the Netherlands. Around 15 000 employees work in Valora's network.

In 2021, Valora produced around 730 million baked goods with its 16 production lines operated by Brezelbäckerei Ditsch in Germany and the US and by Brezelkönig in Switzerland.

=== Valora Retail division ===
The Valora Retail division comprises more than 2,000 small-scale points of sale at highly frequented sites in Switzerland, Germany, Luxembourg and Austria. The division includes the formats k kiosk, Press & Books, avec, cigo, ServiceStore DB, U-Store and the own brand ok.– as well as a range of digital services.

=== Valora Food Services division ===
The Valora Food Service division comprises more than 700 small-scale points of sale at highly frequented sites in Switzerland, Germany, Luxembourg, Austria and the Netherlands. The division includes the formats BackWerk, Ditsch, Brezelkönig, Frittenwerk, Caffè Spettacolo and SuperGuud. The Brezelbäckerei Ditsch operates production sites in Germany and the USA.
