= Isaac Garza Garza =

Mexican businessperson

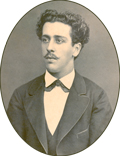
- Isaac Garza in 1876
- Born: June 3, 1853; Monterrey, Mexico
- Died: May 1, 1933 (aged 79); Monterrey, Mexico
- Occupation: Businessman
- Spouse: Consuelo Sada Muguerza
- Children: 8

Isaac Garza Garza (June 3, 1853 – May 1, 1933) was a Mexican businessman.

== Career ==
Isaac Garza Garza was a Mexican businessman and a pioneer of industrial development in Monterrey, Nuevo León, Mexico. He established the Cuauhtémoc Moctezuma Brewery and later served as chairman of the Monterrey Foundry (Spanish: Fundidora de Fierro y Acero de Monterrey), the Vidriera Group, and the Cervecería Group.

These enterprises formed the foundation of what became Grupo Monterrey, one of Mexico's largest industrial conglomerates. The company was organized into two major consortiums: Grupo Industrial Alfa, initially led by his grandson Bernardo Garza Sada, and Valores Industriales (VISA), initially led by another grandson, Eugenio Garza Lagüera.
