= José Antonio Fernández Carbajal =

Mexican businessman

- Education: EGADE
- Occupation: Chairman of the Board of Directors of FEMSA
- Known for: FEMSA, Coca-Cola FEMSA, OXXO

José Antonio Fernández Carbajal (born 1954 in Puebla) is a Mexican businessman. He is the chairman and former CEO of FEMSA, the largest beverage company in Latin America. Additionally, he serves as president of the Board of Directors of Mexican Economic Development at Monterrey Institute of Technology and Higher Education.

== Early life ==
He received a bachelor's degree in industrial engineering from the Monterrey Institute of Technology and Higher Studies (ITESM) in 1976 and an MBA from ITESM's EGADE Business School in 1979.

== Career ==
In 1987, he joined FEMSA, the holding company of Cuauhtémoc Moctezuma Brewery and became its general director and CEO in 1995. Also in 1995, he joined the board of directors of Monterrey Institute of Technology and Higher Education (ITESM) and became chairman in 2012.

In 2001, Carbajal was appointed CEO and chairman of the board of directors of FEMSA. In 2007, he joined the Industrias Peñoles board of directors.

He became a board member of Heineken in 2010. In 2014, he stepped down from his role as CEO of FEMSA, remaining chairman of the current board of directors.

In 2017, Carbajal was elected to a five-year term for the MIT Corporation, the school's board of trustees. He also serves on the board of directors of Coca-Cola FEMSA.

== Other activities ==
- Council on Foreign Relations (CFR), Member of the Global Board of Advisors
