= C. B. Waite =

American photographer

Charles Betts Waite (December 19, 1861 – March 22, 1927) was an American photographer who worked in Mexico at the turn of the twentieth century. He signed his work C. B. Waite, and his full name is often mistakenly stated as Charles Burlingame Waite.

== Personal life and career ==
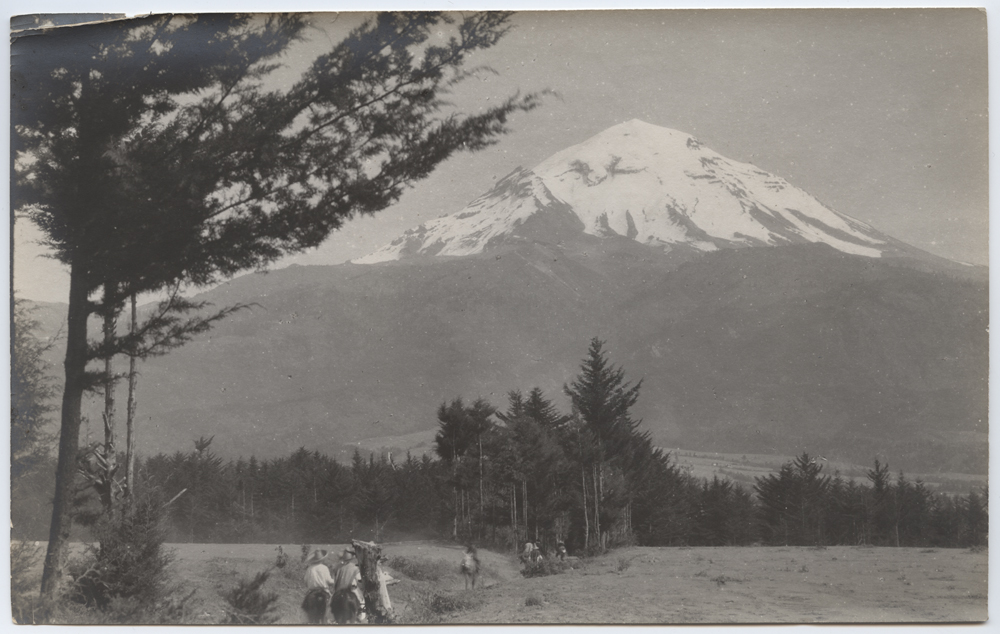
Men on Horses with Mountain in Background, ca. 1896-1913, DeGolyer Library, Southern Methodist University

Born on December 19, 1861, in Ohio (Note: On passport and consular documents, Waite named his birthplace as Plymouth, Ohio, and alternatively Auburn Township, Crawford County, Ohio, (raised in Plymouth, Ohio).) to William and Ann (née Dawson) Waite. (Note: Ann Waite was deceased by 1907.) Waite's brother, Frank Dawson Waite, was editor of the San Diego Sun newspaper from 1887 to 1910. Charles Betts Waite moved to California by June 1881, when he was working with photographer Henry Ellis Coonley in the San Diego region. In the 1890s, Waite's photographs of Southern California ranches and landscapes appeared in the magazine Land of Sunshine, and he was contracted by railroad companies to provide views of Arizona and New Mexico. Waite's only child, a daughter, was born in 1885.

He worked in Los Angeles as a photographer for Burdick and Company in his late twenties. Waite owned his own studio, having gained a reputation for his work as a landscape photographer. When he was 35, about 1896, he was married to Alice M. Cooley, who was born in Missouri.

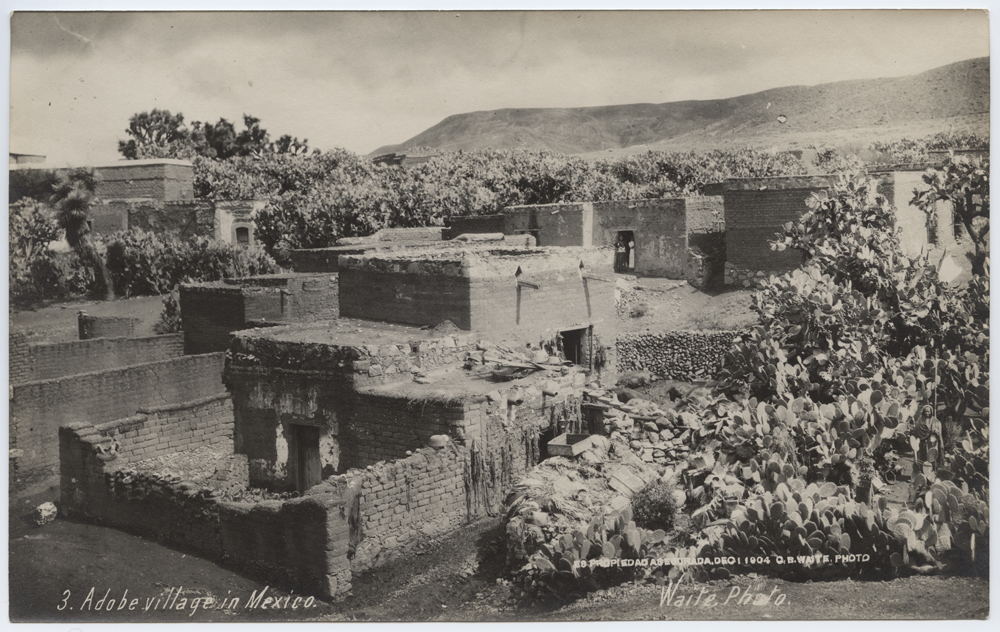
Adobe village in Mexico, 1904, DeGolyer Library, Southern Methodist University

He traveled to Mexico City and in May 1897 established a photography studio there, during the Porfirio Díaz government. He became part of Porfirian society, taking photographs of many in the ruler's circle. He was among a group of expatriate photographers (such as Winfield Scott and fellow San Diegans Ralph Carmichael and Percy S. Cox) working in Mexico in the first decade of the 20th century. Waite traveled throughout Mexico, exploring archaeological sites and the countryside.

[Waite’s life] corresponds with that of adventurers, brave explorers with romantic spirits and materialistic outlooks, who toured the hitherto unknown world, discovering their riches and inventing paradises.

— Francisco Montellano, author of C. B. Waite, fotógrafo

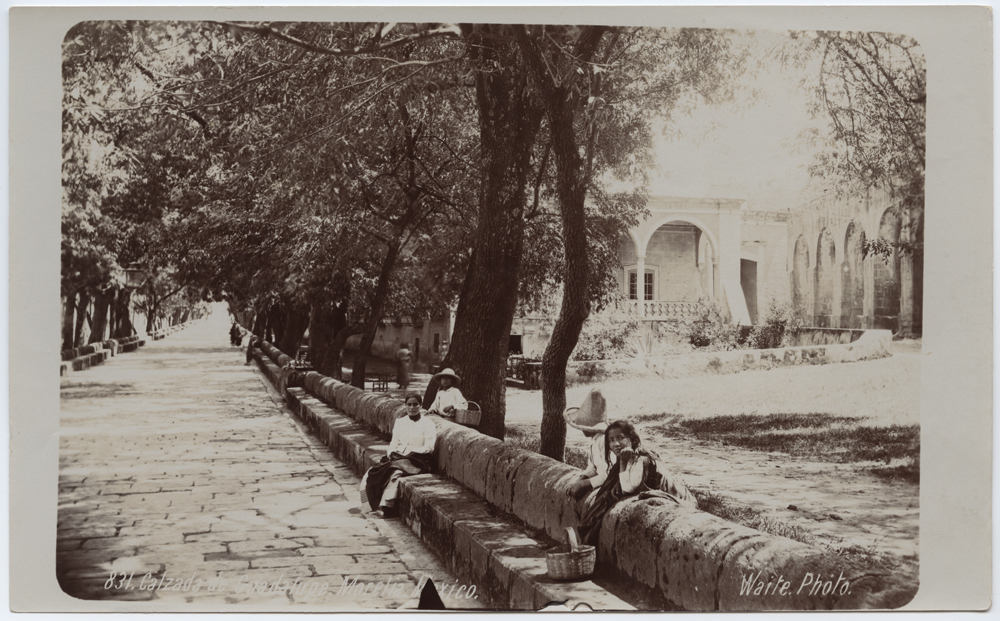
Calzada de Guadalupe, Morelia, Mexico, 1904, DeGolyer Library, Southern Methodist University

His works were published in books, travel magazines, and on post cards, having contracted with the Sonora News Company. He also worked for several Mexican newspapers, and he documented United States scientific expeditions in Mexico. The images often included scenic Mexican images and the country's native residents. Many of Waite's photographs depict railroads, parks, archaeological sites, and business enterprises.

Perhaps anticipating the development of a railroad line from the Pacific Ocean to the Gulf of Mexico, linking Salina Cruz and Coatzacoalcos (Puerto México), he purchased about 7,000 hectares (17,000 acres) of land in Veracruz. The subject of many of his works, he lost the scenic property during the Mexican Revolution.

Waite retained his American citizenship, traveling to the United States regularly from 1897 to 1918. Alice Cooley Waite died in Mexico City in June, 1923. Later that year, Waite moved back to Los Angeles, where he died on March 22, 1927.

== Works ==
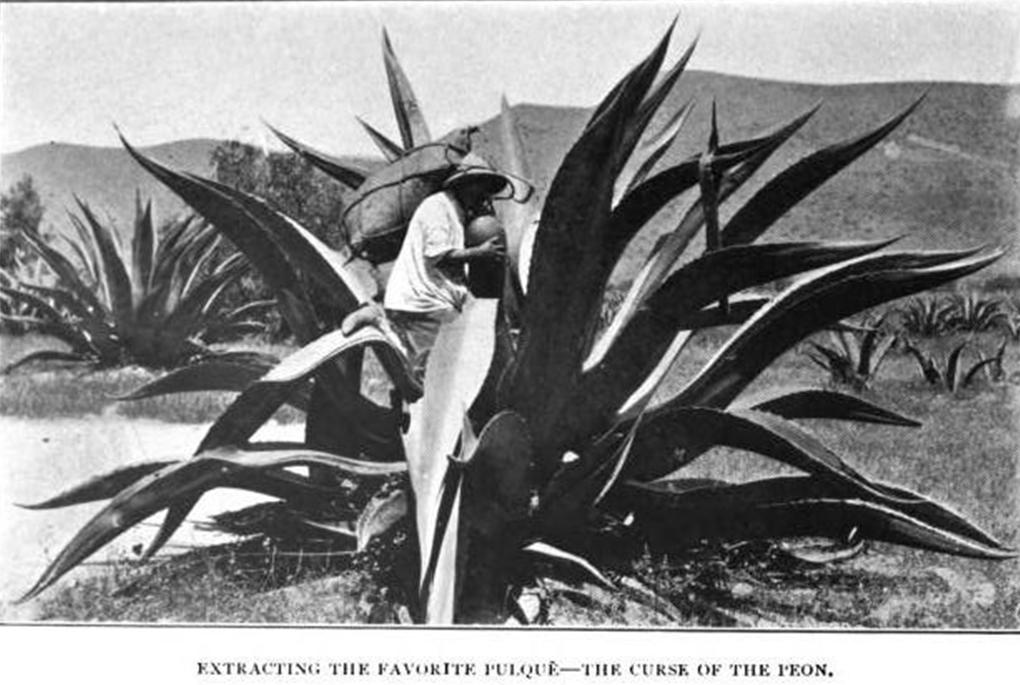
Tlaquichero extracting juice from a cactus for pulque, ca. 1900.

Waite's photographs of the southwestern United States and Mexico can be seen in a number of collections, including the Huntington Library, Art Collections and Botanical Gardens; University of New Mexico's Center for Southwest Research; Princeton University Library's Collections of Western Americana; the Latin American Library of Tulane University; the Benson Latin American Collection, University of Texas at Austin; the Eugene P. Lyle, Jr. Photographs, University of Oregon; the DeGolyer Library, Southern Methodist University; and at the Tomás Rivera Library at University of California, Riverside.

Waite's work has appeared in exhibitions, including "Mexican Life and Culture During the Porfiriato: The Photography of C.B. Waite, 1898-1913," at the Southwest Museum, Los Angeles (1991) and "Mexico: From Empire to Revolution" at the Getty Institute (2000-2001). Some of his photographs are represented in the digital collection "A Nation Emerges: 65 Years of Photography in Mexico".

Critical assessment of Waite's work focuses on his representation of poverty in Mexican society in relation to the industrialization and modernization projects of the Porfirio Díaz government.

== Gallery ==
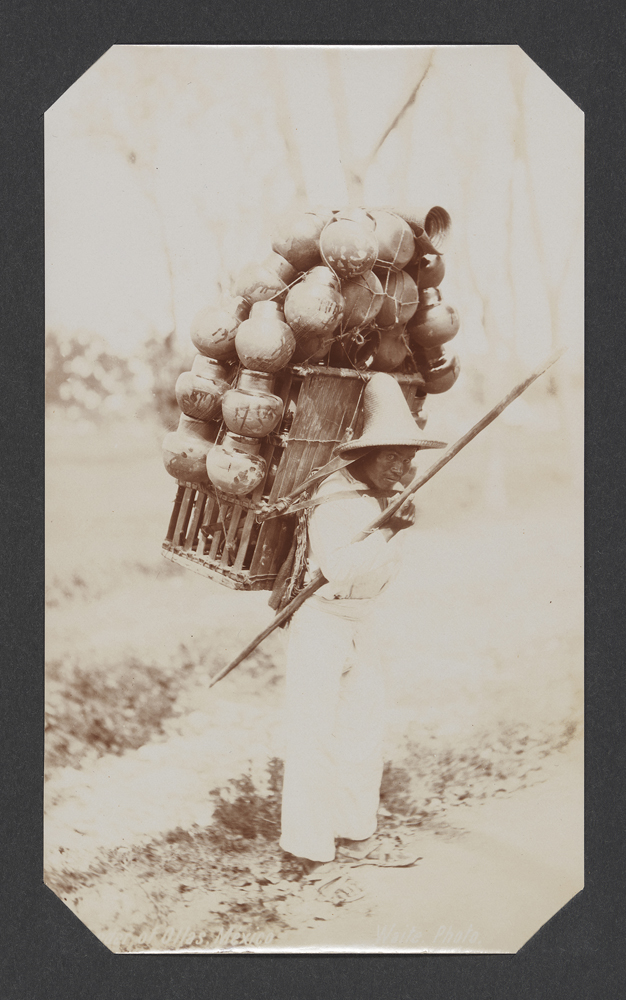
Pot vendor, 1902. DeGolyer Library, Southern Methodist University

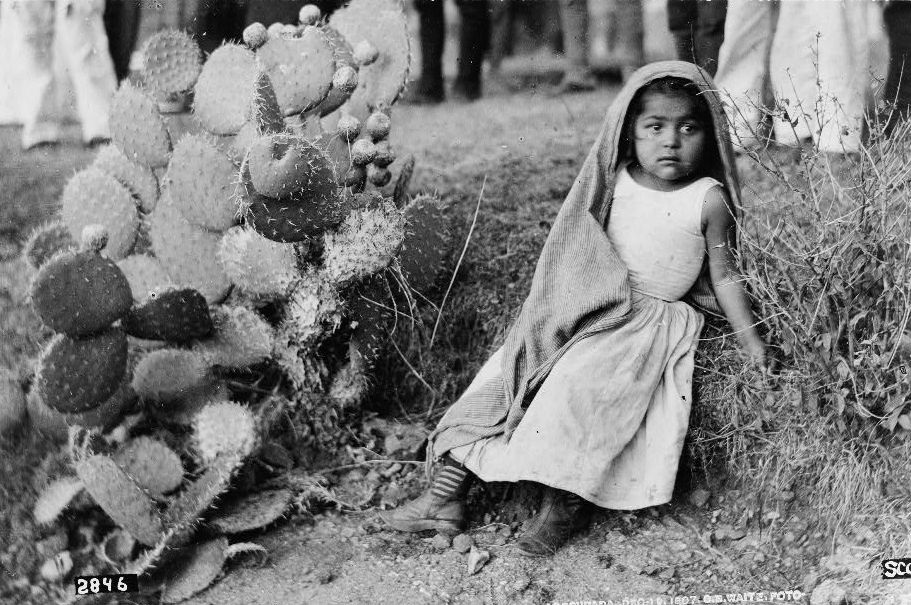
Native child, 1907. Library of Congress

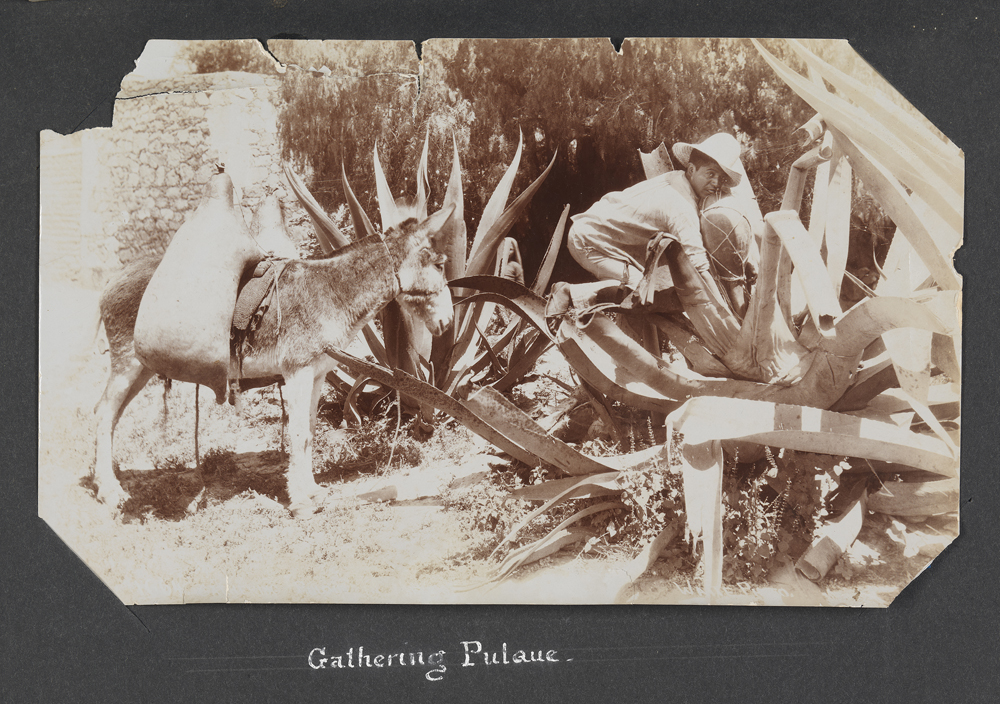
Gathering pulque, 1902. DeGolyer Library, Southern Methodist University

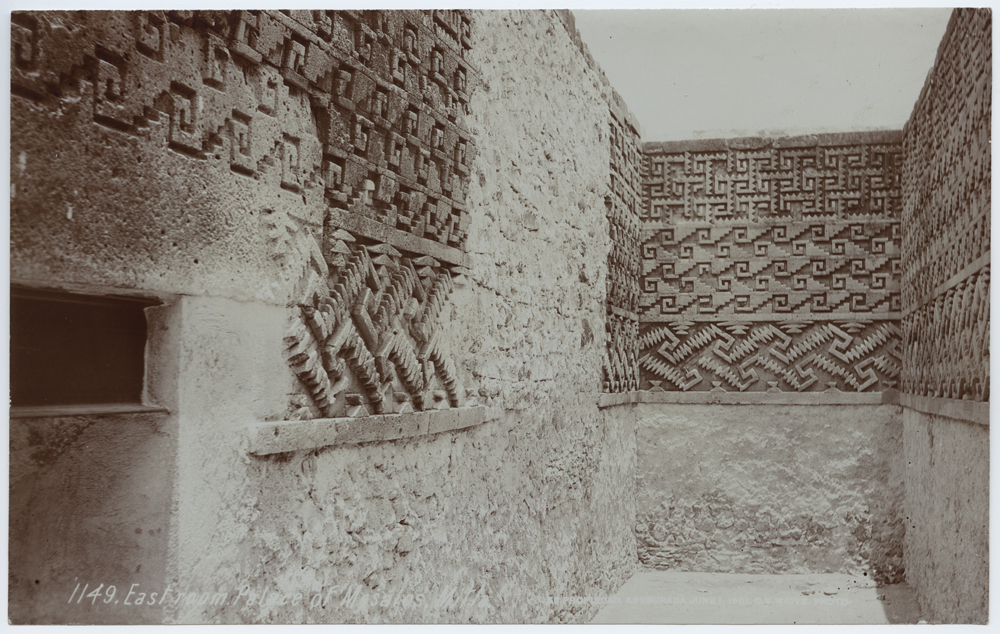
Mitla archeological ruins. 1901. DeGolyer Library, Southern Methodist University

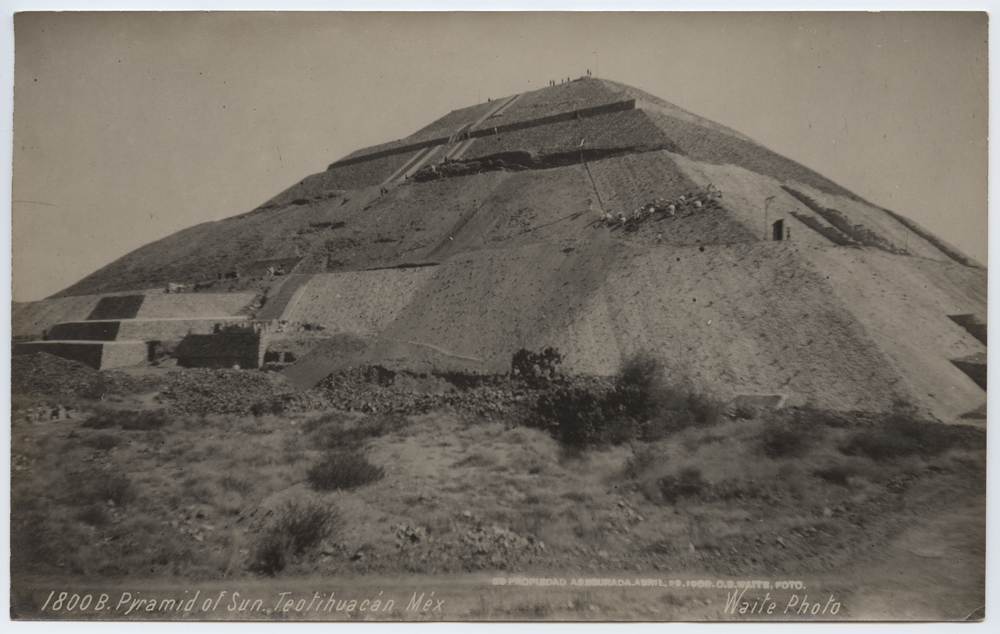
Pyramid of the Sun. Teotihuacan. 1908. DeGolyer Library, Southern Methodist University

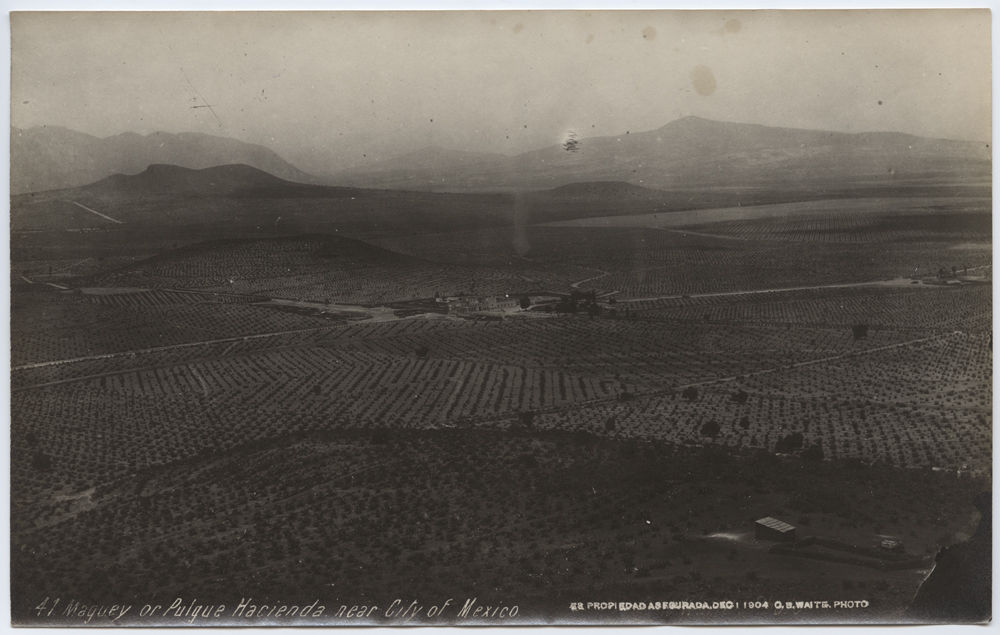
Pulque hacienda near Mexico City. 1904. DeGolyer Library, Southern Methodist University

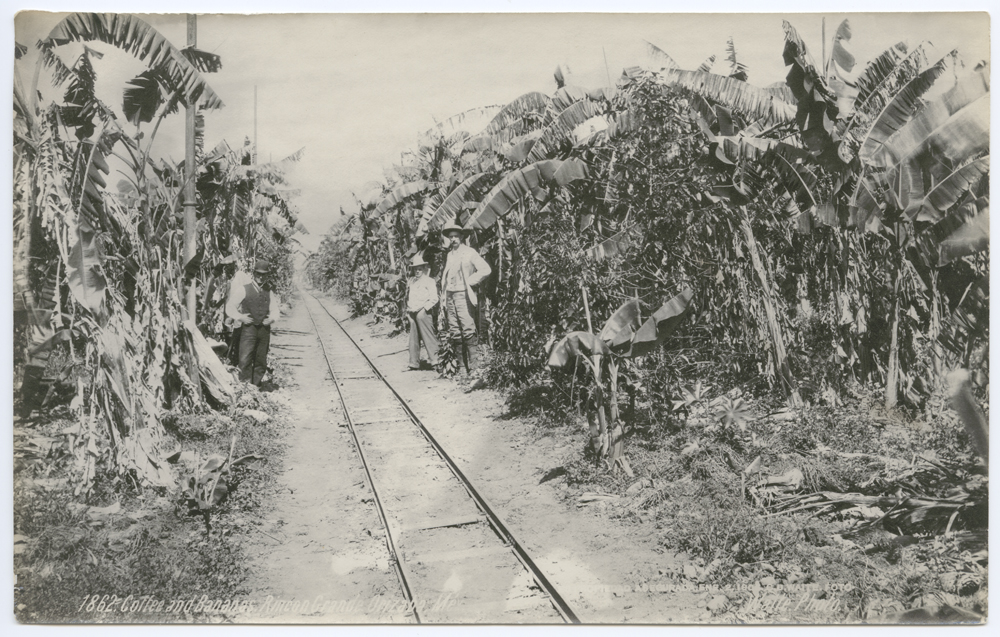
Banana plantation. Ricon Grande Orizaba. 1905. DeGolyer Library, Southern Methodist University

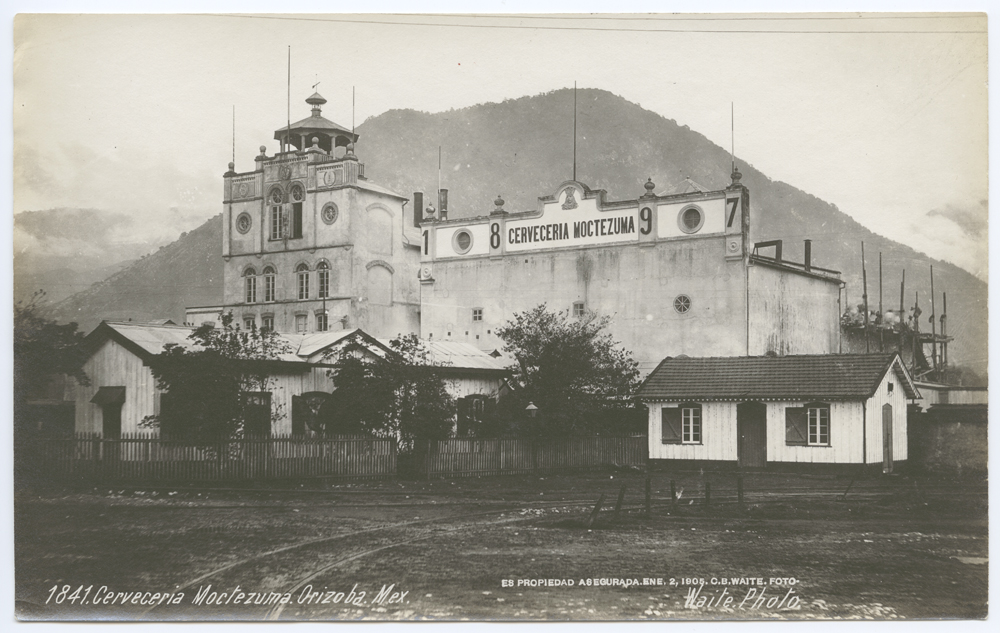
Moctezuma beer brewery, Orizaba. 1905. DeGolyer Library, Southern Methodist University

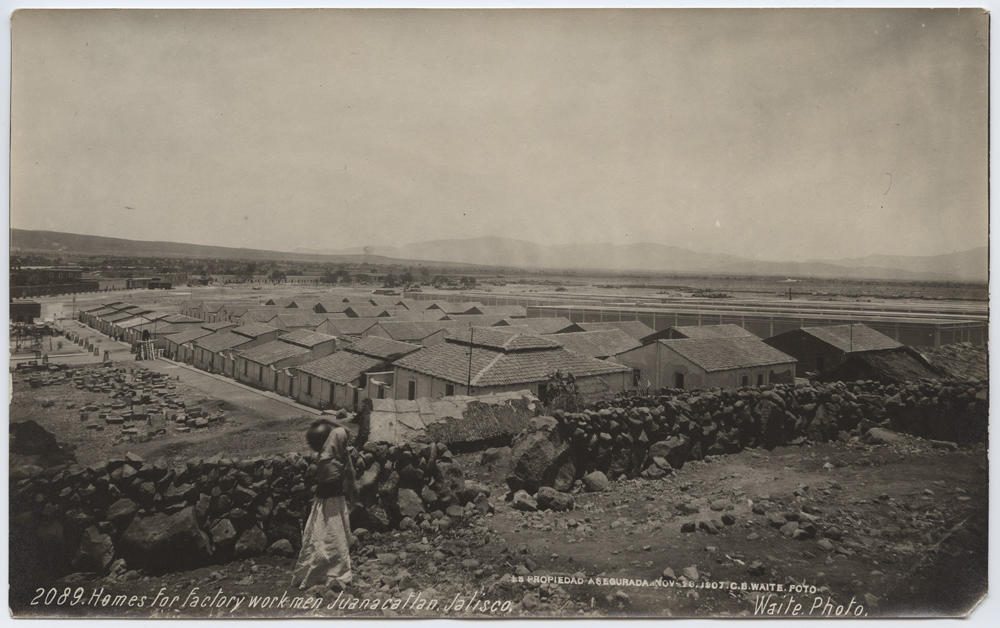
Homes for factory workers, Juanacatian, Jalisco. 1907. DeGolyer Library, Southern Methodist University

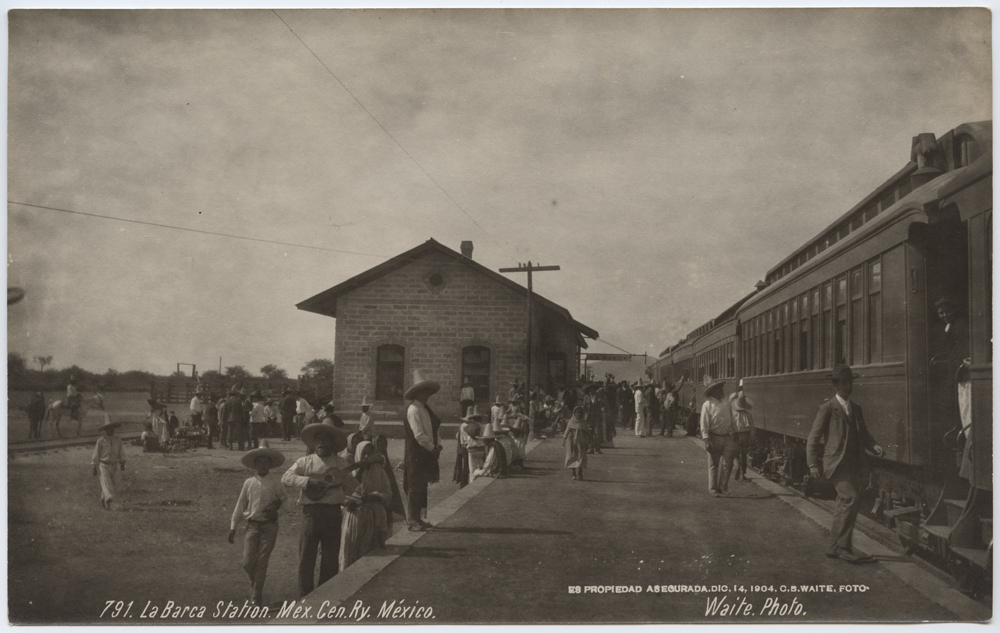
Barca station. Mexican Central Railway. 1904. DeGolyer Library, Southern Methodist University

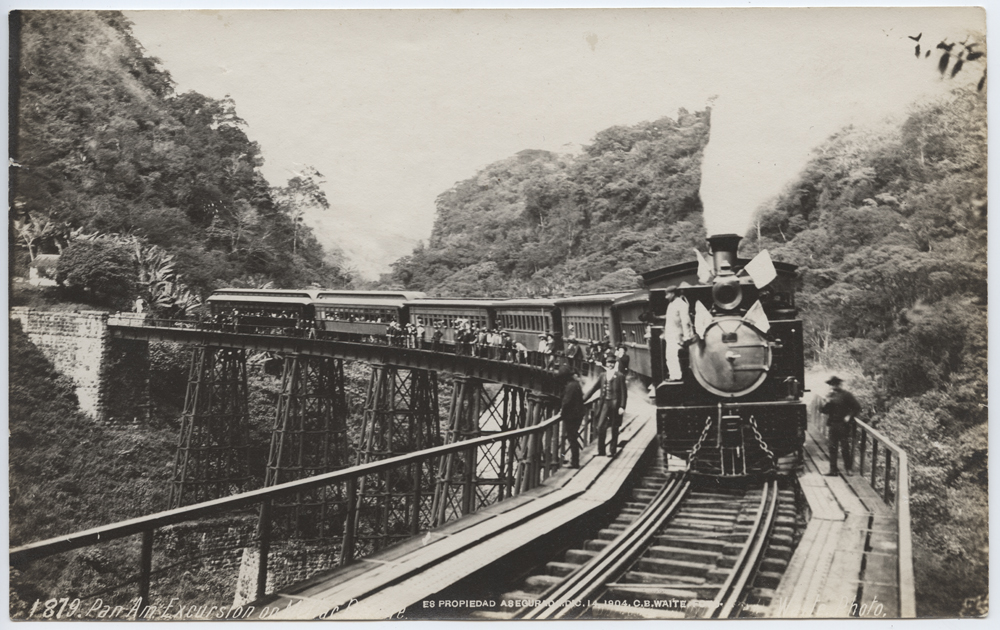
Pan American excursion on the Metlac bridge. 1904. DeGolyer Library, Southern Methodist University

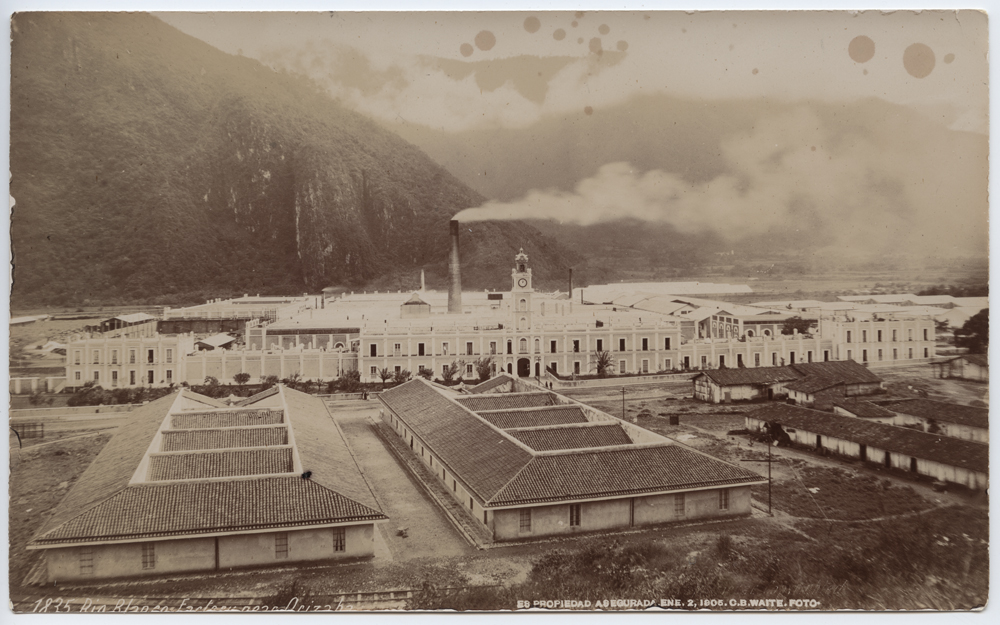
Rio Blanco factory near Orizaba. 1905. DeGolyer Library, Southern Methodist University
