= FEMSA =

Mexican beverage and retail company

Fomento Económico Mexicano, S.A.B. de C.V.

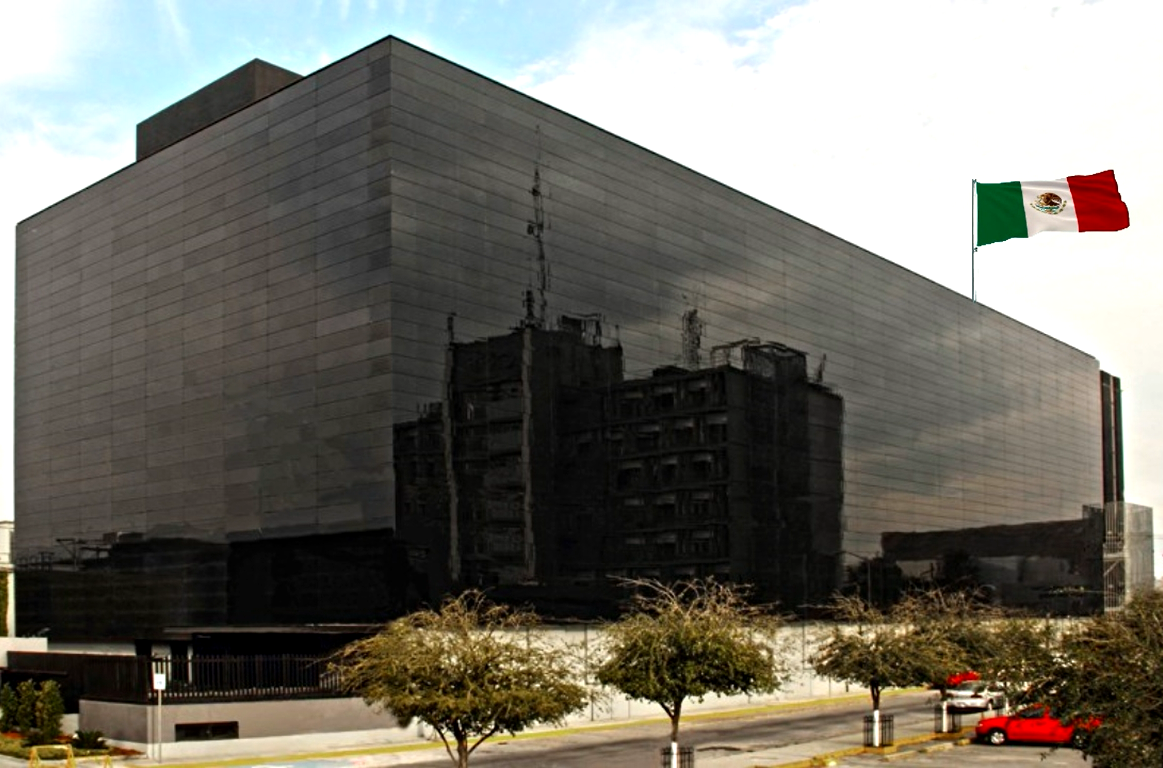
- Formerly: Fomento Económico Mexicano, S.A. de C.V. (1974-2006)
- Type: Public
- Traded as: BMV: FEMSA; NYSE: FMX (ADR)
- Industry: Beverage, Retail
- Founded: 1974; 52 years ago
- Headquarters: Monterrey, Nuevo León, Mexico
- Area served: Latin America and the United States
- Key people: José Antonio Fernández (chairman); Eduardo Padilla Silva (CEO); John Anthony Santa María Otazúa (CEO of Coca-Cola FEMSA); Carlos Arenas (CEO of OXXO)
- Revenue: ▲USD 46.7 billion (2024)
- Net income: ▲USD 1.824 millions (2022)
- Total assets: ▲MXN$ 637.5 billion (2019)
- Number of employees: +230,000
- Divisions: Coca-Cola FEMSA (47.8%); FEMSA Comercio; FEMSA Negocios Estrategicos; Heineken (8%)
- Subsidiaries: Valora

Fomento Económico Mexicano, S.A.B. de C.V., doing business as FEMSA, is a Mexican multinational beverage and retail company headquartered in Monterrey, Mexico. It operates the largest independent Coca-Cola bottling group in the world and the largest convenience store chain in Mexico.

FEMSA reported revenues of US$26.9 billion for 2019, making it the fifth largest company of Mexico. It has operations in Latin America mainly through bottling plants, convenience stores, drugstores, fuel stations, and third-party logistic services, and in the United States, where it participates in the jan-san distribution industry. It is well known in Mexico for its convenience store chain Oxxo, it previously owned Cuauhtémoc Moctezuma Brewery (exchanged in 2010 for a 20% stake in Heineken N.V.), and for being the owner of C.F. Monterrey, a Liga MX football team.

FEMSA has been listed on the Mexican Stock Exchange since 1978 and on the NYSE through ADRs since 1998. It is a constituent of the IPC, the main benchmark index of the Mexican Stock Exchange, and of the S&P Latin America 40, which includes leading, blue chip companies from Latin America.

== History ==
FEMSA originated from the Cervecería Cuauhtemoc brewery, which was established by Isaac Garza Garza in 1890. In 1909, Garza founded Vidriera Monterrey (now Vitro) to produce bottles for the Cuauhtémoc brewery.

The vertical strategic integration of Cervecería Cuauhtemoc began in 1936, with the establishment of Fábricas Monterrey, S.A. de C.V. for the production of bottle caps. Packaging operations expanded in 1957 with the production of labels and flexible packaging. During this period, FEMSA's operations were part of what became known as Grupo Monterrey (lit. the Monterrey Group), which also included interests in banking, steel, and other packaging operations.

In 1974, Grupo Monterrey was divided into two branches by the descendants of the founding families of Cervecería Cuauhtémoc. The steel and packaging operations gave rise to the creation of Corporación Siderúrgica S.A. (later consolidated into Grupo ALFA), which would be controlled by the Garza Sada family, and the beverage and banking operations led to the creation of FEMSA, whose control fell to the Garza Lagüera family. FEMSA was listed on the Mexican Stock Exchange on September 19, 1978.

In 1985, Cuauhtémoc merged with Moctezuma to form Cervecería Cuauhtémoc Moctezuma. FEMSA then undertook an extensive corporate and financial restructuring that was completed in December 1988. In 1993, Coca-Cola purchased a 30 percent stake in FEMSA, creating the Coca-Cola FEMSA division. In January 2006, FEMSA Cerveza acquired Kaiser Cervejarias from Molson Coors Brewing Co. On December 19, 2006, Coca-Cola FEMSA announced its attempt to buy out Mexican juice producer Jugos del Valle. It was acquired in 2007.

On December 20, 2007, Cascade Investments LLC, whose main partner is Bill Gates, announced it would invest $390 million in FEMSA. The Reuters news agency stated that after this investment, "Gates owns a 1.2 percent stake in Femsa's Series B shares, a 5 percent stake in Series D-B shares, and a 5 percent stake in Series D-L shares." This investment caused the Bill and Melinda Gates' foundation to become the institutional holder possessing the most shares of FEMSA.

On January 11, 2010, the Dutch brewing company Heineken International purchased FEMSA Cerveza (Cervecería Cuauhtémoc Moctezuma), the beer operations of FEMSA, in a stock swap that left FEMSA a 20% owner in the Heineken. In 2011, Coca-Cola FEMSA acquired regional Mexican Coke bottler Grupo Cimsa for 11 billion MXN (US$838 million). In July 2012, Coca-Cola FEMSA announced that it had purchased Lácteos Santa Clara, one of the largest dairy bottlers in Mexico. In August 2015, FEMSA, through its subsidiary FEMSA Comercio entered the drugstore business in South America by acquiring a majority interest in Socofar, a leading South American drugstore operator based in Santiago, Chile. In March 2017, FEMSA's Imbera division announced their shift to hydrocarbons in manufacturing their Coke beverage coolers. The company enacted the manufacturing shift in order to meet higher efficiency standards. In October 2017, FEMSA Logistica rebranded to Solistica.

In early 2019, FEMSA, through its subsidiary FEMSA Comercio, acquired Ecuadorean company Corporacion GPF. In September 2019, FEMSA signed a deal to acquire a minority stake in Jetro Restaurant Depot. In November 2019, FEMSA Logistics subsidiary Solistica completed their acquisition of Brazilian company AGV. Also in November 2019, FEMSA Comercio closed the acquisition of a 50 percent stake in Raizen Conveniencias.

In March 2020, FEMSA acquired a majority stake in WAXIE Sanitary Supply and North American Corporation, to form a new platform within the Jan-San, Packaging and Specialized distribution industry in the United States. In 2022, FEMSA acquired Swiss retail and food service holding company Valora, which operates multiple brands of convenience stores and quick service food outlets in Switzerland, Germany, Austria, Luxembourg, and the Netherlands. In May 2023, FEMSA sold €333 million in Heineken N.V. to the company. FEMSA will no longer hold any shares in Heineken N.V. and Heineken Holding N.V. other than the Heineken Holding N.V. shares underlying the exchangeable bond.

== Divisions ==
=== FEMSA Comercio ===
==== Proximity division ====
FEMSA Comercio operates OXXO, the leading convenience store chain in Mexico and a growing portfolio of other small-format retail chains in Latin America.

OXXO, a subsidiary of FEMSA, was established in 1978. In 2010, OXXO, a subsidiary of FEMSA Comercio, partnered with Heineken Mexico. OXXO's ten-year agreement with Heineken Mexico was renegotiated in early 2019.

In 2013 the FEMSA group acquired an 80% holding in the Mexican arm of restaurant chain Gorditas Doña Tota for US$120 million, their interest being limited to operations within Mexico. Operations within the United States remain in the hands of the original business owners. The company operates as a subsidiary of Femsa Comercio S.A. de C.V. As of 2017 the company claims more than 200 restaurants in 60 Mexican cities and towns. Gorditas Doña Tota started in 1952 when Carlota Murillo of Ciudad Victoria, Tamaulipas began selling gorditas on the street, from a cart on the sidewalk.

==== Health division ====
In November 2012, FEMSA announced it had purchased a 75 percent controlling stake in convenience store Farmacias Yza. In May 2013, FEMSA announced the acquisition of another convenience store, Farmacias FM Moderna.

In September 2015, FEMSA Comercio acquired a controlling stake in SOCOFAR. In December 2015, FEMSA, through FEMSA Comercio, acquired SOCOFAR, a Chilean drugstore company operating the Cruz Verde drugstore network in Chile and Colombia. SOCOFAR was founded in the 1980s and is the largest drugstore chain in Chile, a strong presence in Colombia.

In September 2018, FEMSA, through FEMSA Comercio, announced the acquisition of Ecuadorian drugstore chains Fybeca and SanaSana.

In May 2019, FEMSA Comercio completed its acquisition of Fybeca. FEMSA Comercio announced in December 2019 plans to acquire the remaining 40 percent minority stake of SOCOFAR. FEMSA acquired the remaining stake in SOCOFAR in January 2020.

==== Fuel division ====
OXXO Gas is an affiliate of OXXO, and as of 2020 operates approximately 550 stations in 17 Mexican states.

=== Coca-Cola FEMSA ===
FEMSA owns 47.9% of Coca-Cola FEMSA, the anchor bottler of Coca-Cola and its related soft drink products in several Latin American markets. In 2019, Coca-Cola FEMSA was the world's largest bottler of Coca-Cola, having produced 11% in volume. The Coca-Cola Company owns 28.1% of Coca-Cola FEMSA, and the remaining shares are traded on the New York Stock Exchange and the Mexico City Stock Exchange.

In Mexico, Coca-Cola FEMSA operates in markets including Mexico City, Oaxaca, Morelos, Tabasco, Guanajuato, Querétaro, Veracruz, Puebla, Morelos, Guerrero and Michoacan. The company also has operatations in the Buenos Aires region of Argentina, São Paulo and other areas of Brazil, greater Guatemala City, Guatemala, most of Colombia, and all of Costa Rica, Nicaragua, Panama, Venezuela and Uruguay. The bottler was the majority owner of the Philippines bottler from 2012 to 2018. The company also distributes other drink brands in some of its territories, including local soft drinks, bottled water, beer, energy drinks, sports drinks, fruit juices, tea and soy milk.

On 29 June 2011, was announced that FEMSA will merge to the bottling division of Grupo Tampico, agreeing to pay 9.3 billion pesos (790 million dollars) in stock for the Coca-Cola bottling operations of Grupo Tampico. In September 2011, Coca-Cola FEMSA acquired Grupo Cimsa, a Coca-Cola bottler in the Mexican states of Morelos, Guerrero and Michoacan.

=== FEMSA Negocios Estratégicos ===
FEMSA Negocios Estratégicos (formerly known as FEMSA Insumos Estratégicos) provides logistics, point-of-sale refrigeration services and plastics services to FEMSA's business units and third-party clients. It is subsequently divided into:

==== Solistica ====
Solistica is a third-party logistics provider for a number of industries, including pharmaceuticals, automotive, technology, and consumer goods. Solistica manages primary distribution for Coca-Cola FEMSA and Heineken and secondary distribution for FEMSA Comercio's Proximity Division.

==== Imbera ====
Imbera manufactures equipment for the soft drink, beer and food service industries, including coolers, food processing, storage and weighing equipment. Imbera has manufacturing plants in Mexico, Colombia, and Brazil.

==== Plásticos Técnicos Mexicanos (PTM) ====
PTM develops "plastic transformation projects" tailored to FEMSA Enterprises and third-party clients in terms of materials handling, automobiles, and food/beverages. Their capacity includes the different plastic manufacturing processes: blowing, injecting, heat forming, and extrusion.

== See also ==
- Beer in Mexico
- Heineken International
- Mexican Coke, pertaining to the importation of Mexican Coca-Cola products containing cane sugar into other North American markets, including those of FEMSA
- List of companies traded on the Bolsa Mexicana de Valores
- List of Mexican companies
- Economy of Mexico
