= History of the Monterrey Institute of Technology and Higher Education =

Monterrey Institute of Technology and Higher Education is a private research university based in Monterrey, Mexico.

== Early years ==
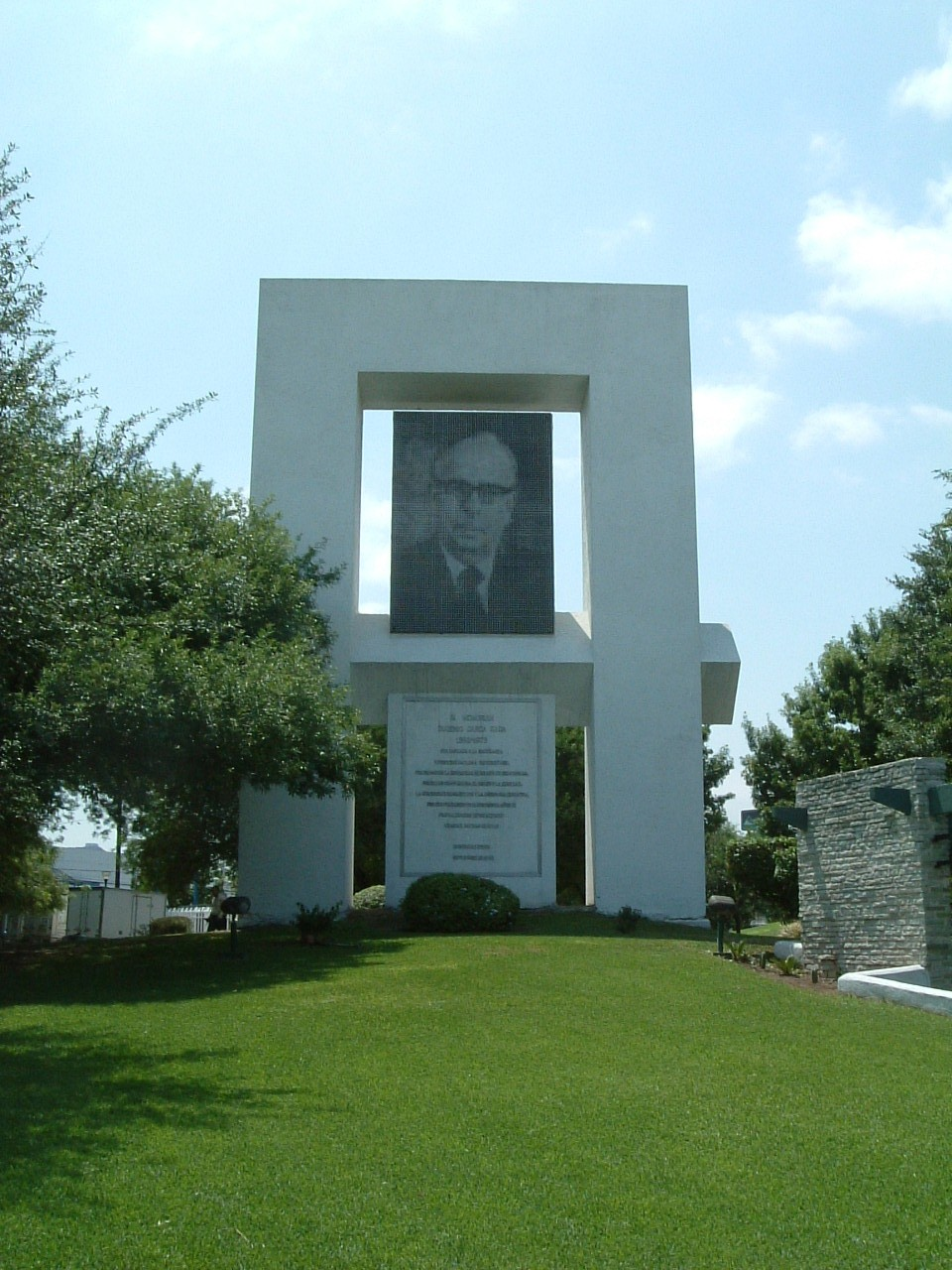
Eugenio Garza Sada Memorial at the Monterrey Campus.

The institute was founded on 6 September 1943 by a group of local businessmen led by Eugenio Garza Sada, a moneyed heir of a brewing conglomerate who was interested in creating an institution that could provide highly skilled personnel — both university graduates and technicians— to the booming Monterrey corporations of the 1940s. The group was structured into a non-profit organization called Enseñanza e Investigación Superior A.C. (EISAC) and recruited several academicians led by León Ávalos y Vez, an MIT alumnus and then Director-General of the School of Electrical and Mechanical Engineering of the National Polytechnic Institute, who designed its first academic programs and served as its first Director-General.

In its early years the Institute operated at Abasolo 858 Oriente in a large, two-story house located a block and a half away from Zaragoza Square, behind the city's Metropolitan Cathedral. As its first facilities soon proved to be insufficient, it started renting out adjacent buildings and by 1945 it became apparent that a university campus was necessary. For that reason, a master plan was commissioned to Enrique de la Mora and on 3 February 1947 what would later be known as its Monterrey Campus was inaugurated by Mexican President Miguel Alemán Valdés.

Because the operations of the local companies were highly reliant on U.S. markets, investments, and technology; internationalization became one of its earliest priorities. In 1950 it became the first foreign university in history to be accredited by the Southern Association of Colleges and Schools (SACS), one of the six regional accreditation agencies recognized by the United States Department of Education. Its foreign accreditation would end up being a decisive influence in its development, as it was forced to submit itself to external evaluation earlier than most Mexican universities (1961) and unlocked additional sources of revenue, such as tuition funds from foreign students interested in taking summer courses in Mexico for full-academic credit.

== Expansion ==
Its growth outside the city of Monterrey began in the late-1960s, when both its rector and head of academics lobbied for expansion. A first attempt, funded a few years earlier by several businessmen from Mexicali, Baja California, was staffed and organized by the Institute but faced opposition from the Board of Trustees once the federal government refused any additional subsidy and members of the Board cast doubt on its ability to gets funds as an out-of-state university. At the end the project was renamed Centro de Enseñanza Técnica y Superior (CETYS) and grew into a fully independent institution.

Aside from the CETYS experiment and the 150 hectares bought in 1951 for the agricultural program's experimental facilities in nearby Apodaca, Nuevo León, no other expansion outside Monterrey was attempted until 1967, when a school of maritime studies was built in the port of Guaymas, Sonora. Shortly thereafter, premises were built in Obregón and courses began to be offered in Mexico City. Those premises and the ones that followed, then called external units, were fully dependent of the Monterrey Campus until 1984, when they were restructured as semi-independent campuses and reorganized in regional rectorates (see Organization).

In 1987, when the Southern Association of Colleges and Schools demanded faculty members with doctorate degrees to lecture 25% of its undergraduate and 100% of its postgraduate courses, the Institute invested considerably in both distance learning and computer network technologies and training, effectively becoming, on 1 February 1989, the first university ever connected to the Internet in both Latin America and the Spanish-speaking world. Such efforts contributed to the creation of its Virtual University a few years later and allowed it to become the first country-code top level domain registry in Mexico; first by itself from 1989 to 1995, and then as a major shareholder of NIC Mexico, the current national registry.
