= David Noel Ramírez Padilla =

Mexican academic administrator, accountant and activist (1950–2025)

David Noel Ramírez Padilla Knight of the Order of Saint Gregory the Great, KSG
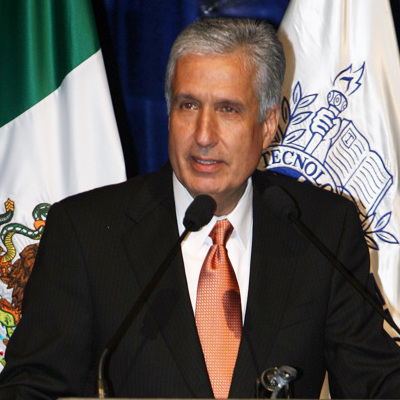

4th Rector of the Monterrey Institute of Technology
- In office January 2011 – June 2017
- Preceded by: Rafael Rangel Sostmann
- Succeeded by: David Garza Salazar

Personal details
- Born: January 12, 1950 San Juan de los Lagos, Jalisco, Mexico
- Died: January 28, 2025 (aged 75)
- Education: Monterrey Institute of Technology (ITESM)

David Noel Ramírez Padilla KSG (January 12, 1950 – January 28, 2025) was a Mexican academic administrator who was the dean of the Monterrey Institute of Technology and Higher Education university system (ITESM), which has thirty-one campuses in various parts of Mexico. Ramírez's education and career as an educator and administrator were all around this university system, culminating in his position beginning in January 2011. Additionally, he authored eight books and numerous articles, served as a keynote speaker at various conferences, and advised outside institutions on matters regarding accounting, finance, and human development.

== Background ==
David Noel Ramírez Padilla was born in San Juan de los Lagos, Jalisco, on January 12, 1950. He attended ITESM as a student from 1967 until graduating in 1972 with a degree in Public Accounting, magna cum laude. In 1974, he obtained his master's degree in business administration with a special focus in Finance from the same institution, also graduating magna cum laude. In 1975, he took courses at Oklahoma State University.

He was married to Magdalena Margaín de Ramírez, with two children and four grandchildren, and lived in San Pedro Garza García, Nuevo León.

Ramírez died on January 28, 2025, at the age of 75.

== Career ==
Ramírez was a professor at ITESM for thirty-eight years, teaching over 15,000 students. He also worked as a guidance counselor, department director, and other positions. He became the director of the Business School at ITESM in 1981, running it for ten years. In 1991, he became the president of the Zona Norte region. From 2008 to 2010, he was Rector of the Zona Norte, Zona Sur, and Zona Occidente, administering twenty of the system's 31 campuses, as well as being in charge of the development of the Universidad TecMilenio división. Ramírez was appointed the rector of the Tecnológico de Monterrey in 2010 and officially took over in January 2011. His administrative philosophy was that of mentorship, promoting development through teamwork. During his administrative career, he stressed research to confront many of Mexico's problems, especially the socioeconomically marginalized. He also worked to create technological parks and programs to promote entrepreneurism and spur development in various regions of Mexico.

Aside from his teaching and administrative career at ITESM, Ramírez worked as an advisor and was a speaker at conferences in Mexico and abroad on topics such as accounting, finance, and human development. He acted as president and/or member of several boards of directors in different associations, professional organizations, businesses, and civil associations, such as the Instituto de Contadores Públicos de Nuevo León from 1991 to 1992. He was an advisor to various universities, companies, banks, and civil associations. Some of his clients were Mexican Derivatives Exchange, Grupo Financiero Margen, and the San José Hospital. He was interviewed by Milenio in 2012 concerning student participation in the Mexican presidential election, especially on online social networks.

Ramírez wrote eight books which include Contabilidad Administrativa, Contabilidad de Costos, un enfoque para la Toma de Decisiones, Empresas Competitivas, Integridad en las Empresas: Ética para los Nuevos Tiempos, Estrategias Financieras para Épocas Inflacionarias Recesivas, Felicidad, ¿dónde estás?, Parejas Sedientas de Felicidad and Edad Dorada: Vívela a Plenitud. Several of his books have been used as undergraduate and graduate textbooks in Mexico and other parts of Latin America. He published various accounting, finance, and human development articles in Mexican and international journals.

Some of his awards included the Pricewaterhouse Award for Best Student in Accounting (1972), the Elizundia Charles Award for Best Student in Accounting (1972), the Ramón Cárdenas Coronado Award as Best Student in Accounting in the state of Nuevo León (1972), the Outstanding Professor Award by the Instituto de Contadores Públicos (1997), the Award for Civic Merit "State of Nuevo León" in the field of education (1999), the Order of St. Gregory the Great from John Paul II (2002), the Distinguished State of Jalisco Citizen Medal (2005), and the Lic. Ricardo Margáin Zozaya Medal for Citizenship (2006).

== See also ==
- List of Monterrey Institute of Technology and Higher Education faculty
