= Arturo Santos García =

Mexican ophthalmologist

Director of the Ignacio A. Santos School of Medicine, Guadalajara.

Personal details
- Education: Ignacio A. Santos School of Medicine; Tecnológico de Monterrey; Universidad de Guadalajara

Arturo Santos García is a Mexican ophthalmologist and clinical researcher.

He currently serves as the director of the Ignacio A. Santos School of Medicine Tecnológico de Monterrey, at the Guadalajara campus.

== Academic training ==
Arturo Santos received his medical education at the Ignacio A. Santos School of Medicine in Monterrey, Mexico. He graduated in 1989. He completed his ophthalmology residency at the Asociación Para Evitar la Ceguera (APEC) in Mexico City. He then went on to pursue a medical fellowship in retina surgery, at the Wilmer Ophthalmological Institute, at Johns Hopkins Hospital. He received his doctoral degree in molecular biology Universidad de Guadalajara. He is a second degree member of the Sistema Nacional de Investigadores, with over 30 articles and 1,000 citations. He was awarded by the president of Mexico Enrique Peña Nieto, along with his colleagues of the Centro de Retina Quirúrgico, the National Technology and Innovation Prize.
