= Roberto Guajardo Suárez =

2nd Director-General of the Monterrey Institute of Technology and Higher Education (ITESM)
- In office 1947–1951
- Preceded by: León Ávalos y Vez
- Succeeded by: Víctor Bravo Ahuja

Personal details
- Born: 16 October 1918 Monterrey, Nuevo León
- Died: October 2008 (aged 89–90)
- Spouse: Adriana Vizcaya Sada (married on 10 December 1949)
- Children: Roberto, Adriana, Sandra, Rogelio, Julio, Marcelo, Camila and Mauricio
- Education: Escuela Libre de Derecho
- Profession: Lawyer

Roberto Guajardo Suárez (16 October 1918 – c. October 2008) was a Mexican lawyer who served as the second director-general of the Monterrey Institute of Technology (ITESM, 1947–1951), as a founding president of Sociedad Artística Tecnológico (the institute's artistic society) in 1948 and as president of Coparmex, a Mexican employers' association (1960–1973).

Guajardo Suárez was born in Monterrey, Nuevo León, into a family composed by Manuel Guajardo Medina and Sofía Suárez Rojas He received a bachelor's degree in law from the Escuela Libre de Derecho (1941) and served as director of Sulfato de Viesca, S.A. (1951–53) and Refrescos Internacionales (1953–60).
