= Rafael Rangel Sostmann =

Mexican academic

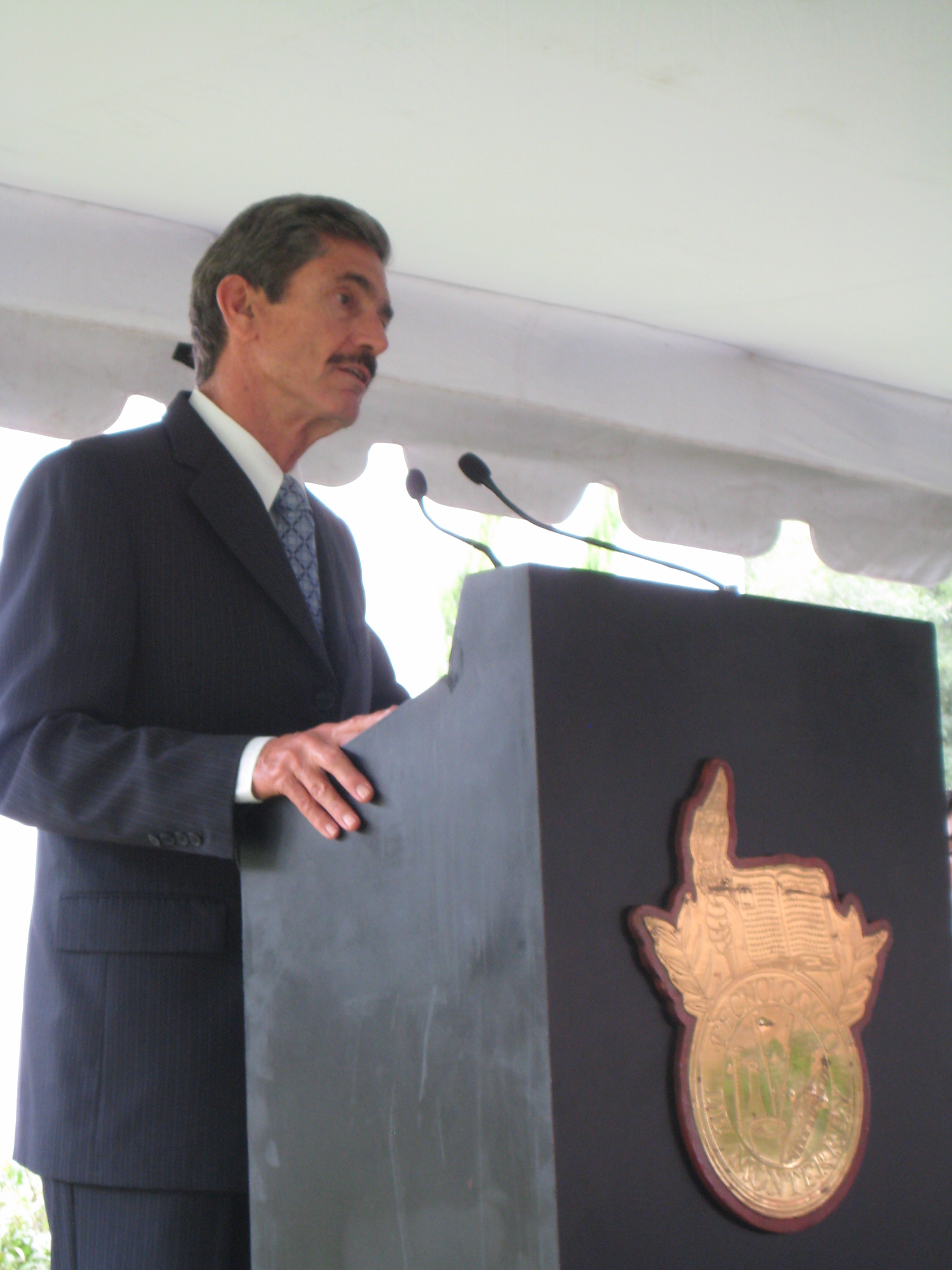
- At the 65th anniversary ceremony of the Monterrey Institute of Technology (ITESM).

3rd Rector of the Monterrey Institute of Technology*
- In office January 1985 – October 2011
- Preceded by: Fernando García Roel
- Succeeded by: David Noel Ramírez Padilla

Personal details
- Born: 14 August 1941 (age 85) Parral, Chihuahua
- Education: Monterrey Institute of Technology (ITESM) and University of Wisconsin–Madison
- Profession: Mechanical engineer and electrical engineer
- He is the fifth person to serve as head of the institute, but only the third to serve as rector.

Rafael Rangel Sostmann (Spanish pronunciation: [rafaˈel raŋˈxel ˈsosman]; born 14 August 1941) is a Mexican engineer and academic who served as president of the Monterrey Institute of Technology (ITESM) from 1985 to 2011. He is a recipient of several honorary degrees, awarded, among others, by Georgetown University (2008), the University of British Columbia (2003), Arizona State University (2004) and the Thunderbird School of Global Management (2009); serves in the board of the World Bank Institute and Cemex; and he is a member of the Global Agenda Council on Education Systems at the World Economic Forum. He announced his retirement as rector of the ITESM on June 21, 2010. On September 12, 2011, Salvador Alva Gómez was announced as the next rector of the Monterrey Institute of Technology (ITESM).

== Biography ==
Rangel was born in Parral, Chihuahua, into a family formed by Rafael Rangel Romo, a mining engineer from Aguascalientes and co-proprietor of Molino de El Retiro, S. de R.L. (a flour mill) and Josefina Sostmann, he has a sister Josefina Rangel Sostman who is a painter. He undertook his secondary and preparatory studies in Parral at Instituto Regional, a school managed by the Society of Jesus, and later moved to Monterrey to enroll at the Monterrey Institute of Technology. At Tech he imposed a national record in the 400 meters dash at the age of 22 and graduated with a bachelor's degree in Mechanical and Electrical Engineering in 1965.

After his graduation he moved to the United States, where he completed a master's degree in mechanical engineering at the University of Wisconsin–Madison in 1966 and worked for two years as a development engineer for Honeywell, in Minneapolis, before returning to Mexico and rejoining his alma mater in 1968 as an assistant professor. In Mexico, he lectured on automation, machine instrumentation, and trained staff for the local industry before marrying Margaret "Peggy" Marshall, daughter of Dr. W. Robert Marshall Jr., dean of engineering of UW–Madison, on 25 January 1969.

He went back to UW–Madison to complete his doctorate degree, which was awarded in 1973. Back in Mexico, he rejoined the Tech as an associate director of the recently created Querétaro campus. Two years later, in 1975, he was appointed director and served in the post until 1979, when he was promoted to vice-rector for the central region, in charge of seven campuses. After the resignation of Fernando García Roel in 1984, he was appointed rector of the institute, at the age of 43. After 26 years as rector, on 21 June 2010, he announced his retirement.

== See also ==
- List of Monterrey Institute of Technology and Higher Education faculty
