= Ignacio A. Santos School of Medicine =

Medical school in Monterrey, Mexico

Ignacio A. Santos School of Medicine.
- Type: Private
- Established: 1978
- Location: Monterrey, Nuevo Leon, Mexico
- Campus: Multiple sites
- Dean: Guillermo Torre-Amione, MD PhD
- Website: www.tecsalud.mx

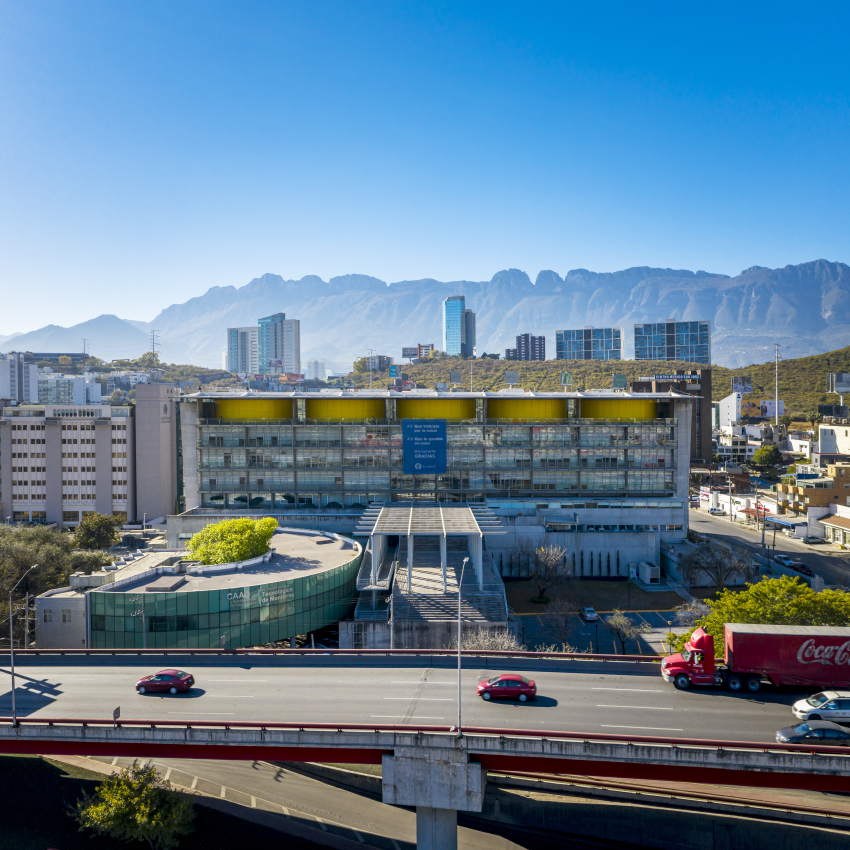
School of Medicine, Tec de Monterrey

The Ignacio A. Santos School of Medicine (Escuela de Medicina Ignacio A. Santos, aka: EMIS) is the medical school division of the Monterrey Institute of Technology and Higher Education (ITESM). It was established in 1978 in Monterrey, Mexico.

The School of Medicine was founded to satisfy the country's need for high quality medical training and innovation in biomedical research. Currently, there are approximately 500 students enrolled in the M.D. program and about 105 postgraduate students. Aside from the medical doctor program, the School of Medicine also offers a joint M.D.-Ph.D. program with Houston Methodist Hospital, MD Anderson Cancer Center, Texas A&M Health Science Center, and other Bachelors in Nursing, Nutrition Sciences and Biomedical Engineering. The graduate medical education department offers several medical residency and fellowship programs. According to the National Association of School and Faculties of Medicine of Mexico (Asociación Nacional de Facultades y Escuelas de Medicina, ANFEM) the school is the third best medical school in the country as of 2009.

== History ==
In the mid 20th century up until the 1970s, directors of ITESM felt that academic standards were falling in the medical fields in Mexico and decided to establish their own medical school. In the 1970s, Ignacio A. Santos, an entrepreneur and philanthropist in Monterrey donated the Hospital San Jóse (HSJ) to ITESM to establish the new program. Another reason for the establishment of the school was to provide advanced and specialized training, which before was studied by Mexican students in the United States.

ITESM took over operations of the hospital along with develop the medical education program, naming it the "Escuela de Medicina Ignacio A. Santos "(EMIS) of Tecnológico de Monterrey (Ignacio A. Santos Medical School) in August 1978. The first class had 27 students selected from a list of 85 applicants.

== Organization of the school ==
The Medical School is part of the Instituto Tecnologico y de Estudios Superiores de Monterrey (ITESM) system which has 31 campuses in various parts of Mexico. It is the most reputable private higher education system in Mexico, with a total of 70,000 students enrolled. At present, with the expansion of the school and increased academic programs in the health program was transformed into what is now the School of Medicine and Health Sciences offers the following programs, at the bachelors level, including: Physician and Surgeon (MD), Biomedical Engineering, Nutrition, Dental Surgery and Clinical Psychology.

The medical school sponsors university linked residency and fellowship programs. Currently this program offers positions in 18 fields, including anesthesiology, clinical quality improvement, general surgery, geriatrics, gynecology and obstetrics, internal medicine, ophthalmology, pediatrics, psychiatry, diagnostic radiology, cardiology, critical care medicine, neonatology, clinical neurology, pediatric neurology and urology. In addition, fellowships in selective areas are offered, including: Breast Surgery, Vascular and Interventional Radiology, Ophthalmic Plastic & Reconstructive Surgery, and Pediatric Ophthalmology and Strabismus.

The school has been accredited by the Mexican Association of Colleges and Schools of Medicine, AC (AMFEM) in November 1996, as National Accreditation System Quality Medical Education. It also is accredited by the Southern Association of Colleges and Schools (SACS) through the Tecnológico de Monterrey. Its curriculum is registered with the Ministry of Education and clinical training programs at undergraduate and graduate levels are in the Ministry of Health. Also in recent years, graduates have been ranked third overall in the National Examination for Medical Residency.

== Program ==
The undergraduate medical program divides into basic medical sciences, clinical sciences and social service, emphasizing basic concepts of sciences and humanities, as well as structure and normal and abnormal function of the human body, always in a biological, psychological and social context.

The method that is used in most of the courses is PBL (problem based learning), where the teacher adopts the role of tutor, working with small groups of 6-8 students. This method requires that the students define the fields of knowledge that they have to study and learn to solve health problems. This methodology seeks to develop the following skills: self learning, clinical reasoning, teamwork and self-evaluation.

The first two years correspond to the phase of basic science, which are studied mostly in Tec's main campus. Between the third and third year, the phase of basic medical sciences is held at the Medical Complex Hospital San José Tec Monterrey. The third stage of the program takes place in the form of quarterly modules, fifth until sixth year and is known as the stage of clinical sciences.

== Admission ==
In Mexico the study of General Medicine is done at the undergraduate level. Those who aim to be part of EMIS are able to apply after graduating from high school with an average start age between 18 and 20 years. The following steps are required to do so.

At first is required to get an average greater than 85 in high school studies, which is a majority of A+ in almost all the subjects. After the first requirement is fulfilled the next step is to get a score on the Scholastic Aptitude Test (PAA) Admission to the institute, exceeding 1350 points.

Then is needed to submit the "Application for admission" to the Admissions Department located inside the facilities of the selected campus If shortlisted the applicant will be informed via email and as next procedure he will have the teachers of EMIS to interview him, during this interview the applicant will have to deliver them a letter of recommendation from his manager at high school and also an essay explaining why he choose the major and what he is planning to do if admitted.

== Teaching facilities ==
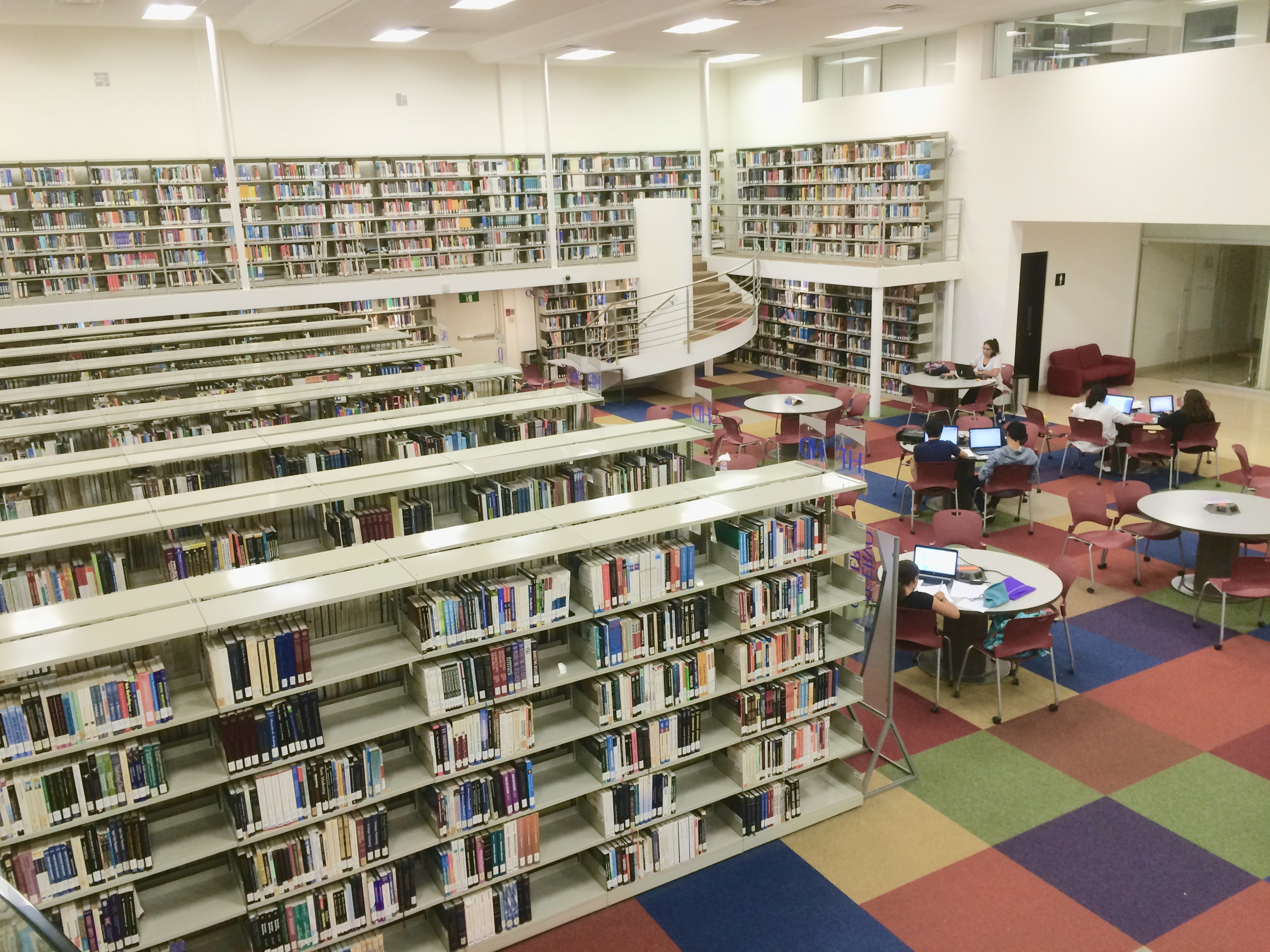
Biblioteca, Tec de Monterrey, Guadalajara

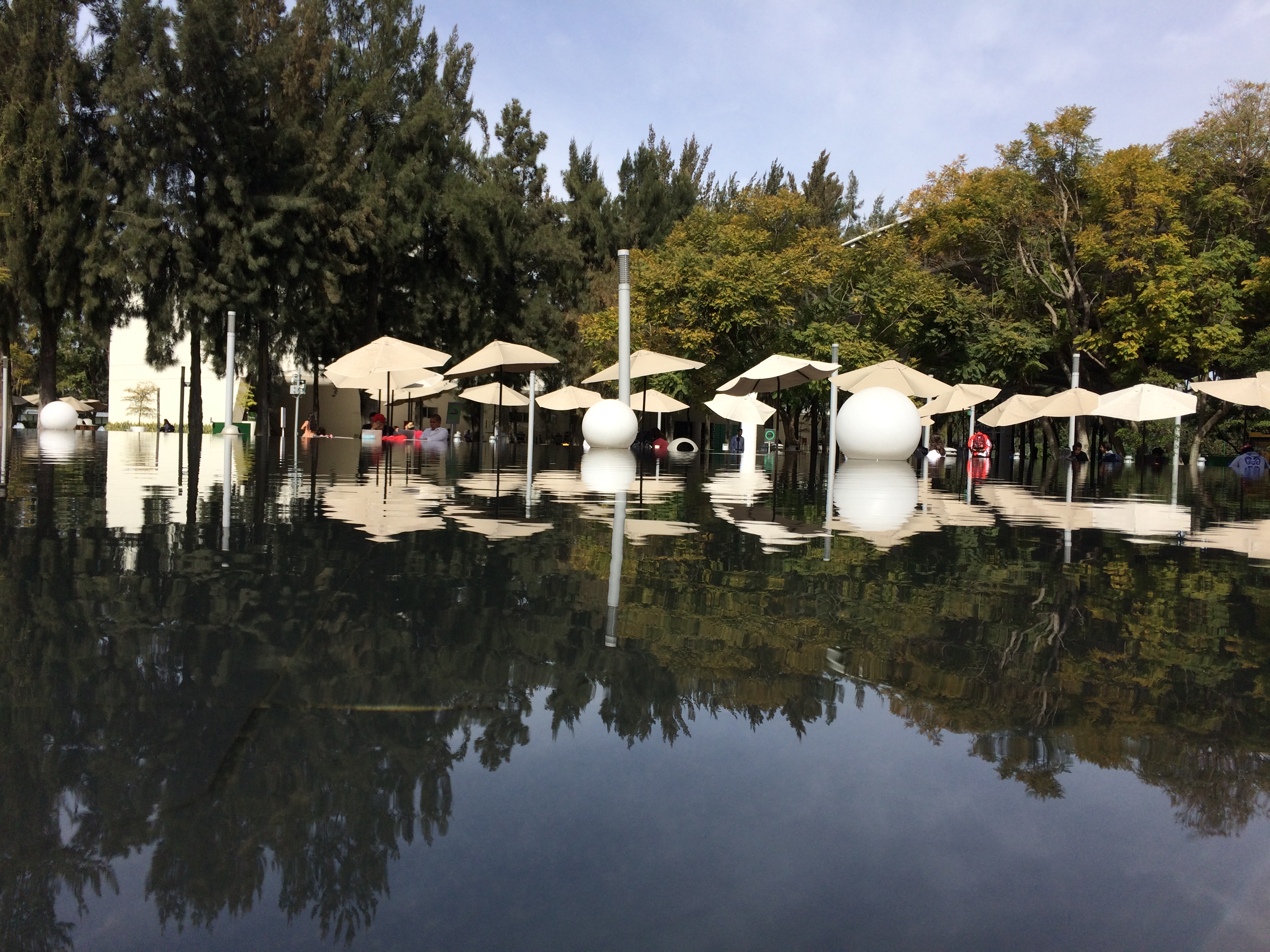
Ciberplaza, Tec de Monterrey, Guadalajara

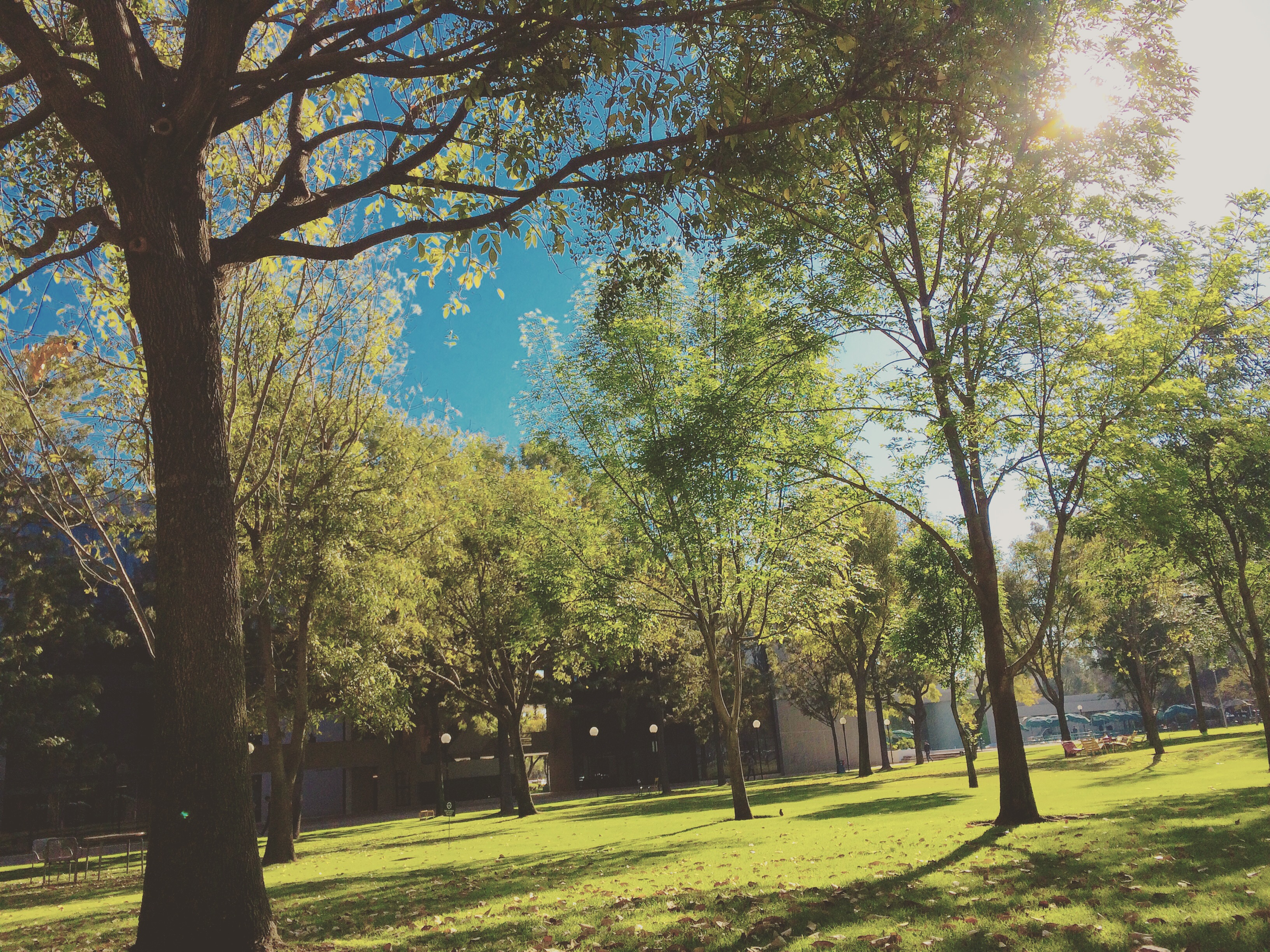
Gardens, Tec de Monterrey, Guadalajara

Inside the ITESM system only 5 campus out of 33 offer the possibility of studying the MD major, these campuses are Monterrey, Chihuahua, Guadalajara, Ciudad de México, and Querétaro.

Campus Monterrey was the first to introduce the medical curriculum at ITESM, so the history and buildings related to this are the most significant. The main campus at EMIS is located next to the San José Hospital. In this main medical campus, students take most classes from second through fourth year. The fifth and sixth years of the MD degree mainly take place in different hospitals. Local rotations in Monterrey include San Jose Hospital, Zambrano-Hellion Hospital (tertiary referral hospitals) and state-owned hospitals such as Materno Infantil in Guadalupe, Metropolitano "Dr Bernardo Sepulveda" in San Nicolás and the psychiatric hospital in Buenos Aires, Monterrey. The San José hospital was donated in 1969 by Don Ignacio A. Santos and his wife Doña Consuelo De La Garza Evia with the main purpose of giving place for investigation and treatment of patients with oncologic issues. Because of this donation, Tec decided to name the school of medicine after Ignacio A. Santos.

EMIS has gathered strong links with other universities and have led to possibilities for rotations outside of Tec's network. These include the National Institiutes in Mexico City, University of California San Diego, Johns Hopkins School of Medicine, Baylor School of Medicine, Baylor Scott-White, among others.

The second campus that offered a M.D. degree is Campus Ciudad De México, in 2011, ITESM decided to build a new facility called "Scientific Park".

This building will have specific scientific laboratories aimed at solving the needs of biotech engineering and biomedical engineering, as well as modern equipment for the development of activities for both careers. Furthermore, the government created an agreement with ITESM and now a department in charge of watching, supporting, and promoting new inventions is created and will take place in the facility.

Campus Guadalajara has dedicated facilities for the lectures and clinical practices of the Medical Doctor program (Médico Cirujano), the biomedical engineering program, the nutritionist program, and the biotechnology program. The school has 12 laboratories, including an anatomy lab, a pathology lab, a microbiology lab, and a food science lab. The Guadalajara Biotechnology and Health Division is chaired by Arturo Santos García, MD PhD. The Guadalajara campus has teaching facilities in the Puerta de Hierro Hospital, where the school has invested almost a million dollars. The MD program includes clinical rotations in the Centro de Retina Quirúrgico, a prestigious ophthalmology center that has been awarded the National Technology Award, by the former Mexican president, Enrique Peña Nieto.

== See also ==
- Monterrey Institute of Technology and Higher Education
