= Fernando García Roel =

Mexican chemical engineer (1921–2009)

2nd Rector of the Monterrey Institute of Technology and Higher Education (ITESM)
- In office 1960–1984
- Preceded by: Víctor Bravo Ahuja
- Succeeded by: Rafael Rangel Sostmann

Personal details
- Born: 14 August 1921 Monterrey, Nuevo León
- Died: 26 February 2009 (aged 87) Torreón, Coahuila
- Spouse: Laura Molina (married on 1 July 1946)
- Children: Fernando and Héctor
- Education: National Autonomous University of Mexico and University of Wisconsin–Madison
- Profession: Chemical engineer

Fernando García Roel (14 August 1921 – 26 February 2009) was a Mexican chemical engineer. He served as the second rector of the Monterrey Institute of Technology and Higher Education (ITESM, 1960–1984).

García Roel was born in Monterrey, Nuevo León, into a family composed by Mario A. García and María Roel, sister of prominent historian Santiago Roel. He received a bachelor's degree in chemical engineering from the National Autonomous University of Mexico (1943) and a master's degree in the same discipline from the University of Wisconsin–Madison (1948).

In 1966 he was given the University of Wisconsin–Madison's Distinguished Service Award and in 1984 the Víctor Márquez Domínguez Prize of the Mexican Institute of Chemical Engineers. He was conferred an honorary doctorate by the University of Wisconsin–Madison in 1979.

One of the streets crossing the main campus of the Monterrey Institute of Technology is named in his honor.
