= Lorenzo Zambrano =

Mexican businessman and philanthropist

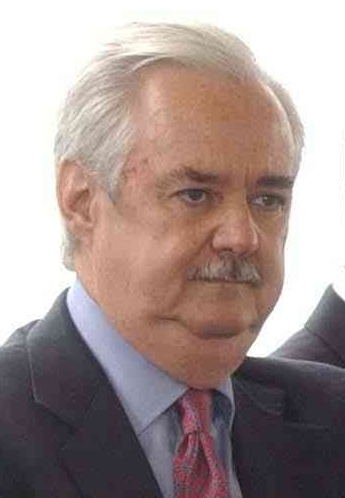
- Zambrano in 2003.
- Born: Lorenzo Hormisdas Zambrano Treviño; 27 March 1944; Monterrey, Nuevo León
- Died: 12 May 2014 (aged 70); Madrid, Spain
- Education: Tecnológico de Monterrey (BS); Stanford University (MBA)
- Employer: Cemex
- Title: Chairman of the board and CEO.
- Board member of: Cemex, IBM, ITESM
- Parent(s): Lorenzo H. Zambrano Hellion and Alejandrina Treviño Madero

Lorenzo Hormisdas Zambrano Treviño (27 March 1944 – 12 May 2014) was a Mexican businessman and philanthropist. He took over Cemex, a regional cement company founded by his grandfather, and transformed it into one of the largest cement producers in the world by the time of his death. Zambrano also financed several cultural initiatives across Latin America and chaired, from 1997 to 2012, the board of trustees of the Monterrey Institute of Technology (ITESM), one of the largest private universities in the region. He also co-owned Axtel, an important Mexican telecommunications company.

== Early years ==
Zambrano was born on 27 March 1944 in Monterrey, Nuevo León, into a wealthy family composed by Lorenzo Hormisdas Zambrano Hellion and Alejandrina Treviño Madero.

The family of his father had built a small fortune in the 19th century as entrepreneurs during the industrialization of their home city. His paternal great-grandfather, Gregorio Zambrano Guajardo, co-founded in 1854 the first textile mill in the region, Fábrica de Hilados y Tejidos de Algodón "La Fama". Likewise, his paternal grandfather, Lorenzo Hormisdas Zambrano Gutiérrez, founded Cementos Portland Monterrey (1920), a small Portland cement producer that profited from Monterrey's reconstruction after the 1910 Revolution.

Conversely, the family of his mother had been one of the most prominent and influential in the neighboring state of Coahuila but suffered significantly after the civil war. The Maderos, once prosperous miners, bankers, wine-makers and overall industrialists from Parras underwent harassment and persecution after Francisco I. Madero, the short-lived democratic president, died in a coup along with his brother Gustavo, Zambrano's maternal grandfather.

Zambrano completed his basic studies in private schools of Monterrey, but despite his wealth his upbringing was far from nonchalant. His grandfather died in a car accident at the age of 50, barely four years after merging his company with Cementos Hidalgo of the Brittingham family, and the Bittingham's longstanding accountant, Jesús Barrera Rodríguez, maneuvered over the Zambranos to overtake control of the business. To aggravate matters, while Lorenzo was studying high school at Missouri Military Academy, in the United States, his father died and the teenager precipitously found himself responsible for his mother and four younger siblings: Patricio, Hernán, Jorge and Nina.

Confronting the situation, Zambrano opted to return to Monterrey and enrolled at the Monterrey Institute of Technology (ITESM), where he graduated with a bachelor's degree in Mechanical Engineering in 1966. Shortly thereafter, he moved briefly to Palo Alto, California, to complete a master's degree in Business Administration (MBA) at the Stanford Graduate School of Business (1968), where he was the only Mexican student registered at the time. After completing his studies, he returned to his home city and joined the family business.

== Business career ==
In 1968 he joined Cemex, and for 17 years he held various executive positions, including plant manager of Torreón and Monterrey, and director of operations.

On 30 May 1985 he was named CEO. Since 1995 Zambrano has also served as chairman of the board. In his role as CEO, he designed and implemented the strategy that allowed Cemex to grow from a local operation in northern Mexico to one of the leading global building-materials company. Through more than 16 mergers and acquisitions, Cemex conquered local, regional and global markets.

On 15 September 1999, Zambrano led a ceremony in the NYSE to begin the listing of the Cemex stock (CX).

He was a member of the board of directors of IBM, and has also served in the international advisory board of Citigroup International, the Advisory Council of Allianz Companies and the boards of directors of Alfa, Banamex, Femsa, Empresas ICA, Televisa and Vitro.

== Philanthropy ==
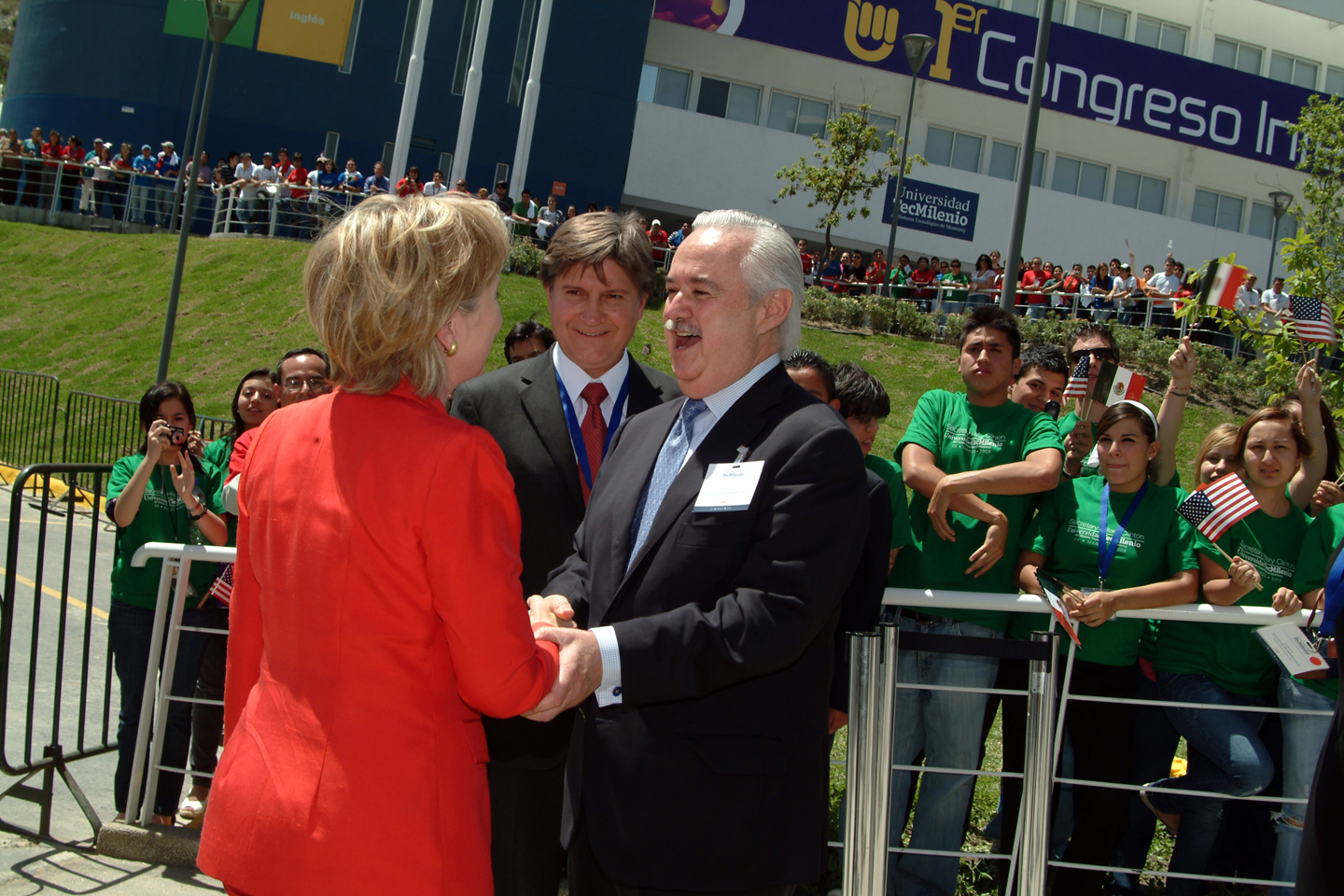
Greeting Hillary Clinton at TecMilenio University in 2009.

From 1997 to 2012, he served as chairman of the board of the Monterrey Institute of Technology (ITESM), one of Latin America's largest private universities. Additionally, he also served on the board of the Monterrey Museum of Modern Art (MARCO).

On 28 November 2011 he announced via Twitter that he would not seek re-election as chairman of the board of the Monterrey Institute of Technology (ITESM) citing personal reasons.

In recognition of his business and philanthropic efforts, Zambrano received the Woodrow Wilson Award for Corporate Citizenship in 2005, the Americas Society's Gold Medal for Distinguished Service, the Excellence in Leadership Award from the Stanford Graduate School of Business, and the Ernest C. Arbuckle Award for Managerial Excellence from the Stanford Business School's Alumni Association.

== Personal life ==
Zambrano was single. He enjoyed vacations in Cancun and New York City, and spent leisure time at a small country house near Monterrey, where he watched movies, read voraciously, and enjoyed long lunches and dinners with family and friends.

He was a renowned collector of Ferraris, having at one point owned some of the most important cars in the marque's history, including the only 1952 250 S Berlinetta Vignale, chassis no. 0156ET, which was the first of Ferrari's famous 250 series to be powered by the Colombo V12 engine and finished first overall at the 1952 Mille Miglia; a 1956 Ferrari 250 GT Berlinetta Competizione 'Tour de France', chassis no. 0557GT, which finished first overall at the 1956 Tour de France Automobile, earning this specific model its nickname in the process; a 1959 250 GT SWB Berlinetta Competizione, chassis no. 1539GT, which was the first of 176 250 SWBs produced and debuted at the Paris Motor Show in October 1959; and a 1962 250 GT SWB Berlinetta Speciale, chassis no. 3269GT, with unique coachwork by Bertone and built to be the personal car of Nuccio Bertone.

== Death and legacy ==
On 12 May 2014, during a business trip to Madrid, Spain, Zambrano had scheduled a corporate meeting at 7 pm local time. After failing to show up, he was tracked down by members of his staff and found dead inside his third-floor suite at Hotel Villa Magna.

His sudden death at the relatively young age of 70 took news outlets and business associates by surprise. Cemex issued a carefully worded press release reassuring clients and investors that business operations would continue normally and that its board of directors —composed mostly by people with no relation to his family— would elect a successor in the following days.

Back in his country, the president of Mexico, members of the cabinet, businesspeople and cultural promoters expressed their condolences through the media and social networks.

== See also ==
- Cemex
- Monterrey Institute of Technology (ITESM)
