= Enrique de la Mora =

Mexican architect

- Born: June 16, 1907; Guadalajara, Jalisco, Mexico
- Died: May 9, 1978 (aged 70); Mexico City, Mexico
- Education: National Autonomous University of Mexico
- Occupation: Architect
- Awards: National Prize for Architecture (Mexico, 1947)
- Buildings: La Purísima (Monterrey, Mexico)

Enrique de la Mora y Palomar (16 June 1907 – 9 May 1978) was a Mexican architect who designed prominent university buildings and Roman Catholic churches in which he experimented with hyperbolic-paraboloid roofs. He is generally regarded, along with the Spaniard Félix Candela, as one of the most famous structural expressionists in Mexico.

De la Mora was distinguished with the National Prize for Architecture in 1947 and some of his works, particularly his Faculty of Philosophy and Letters at the National Autonomous University of Mexico's Ciudad Universitaria, is now part of a UNESCO's World Heritage Site since 2007.

== Early life and education ==
In Guadalajara, Mexico Enrique de la Mora y Palomar, affectionately nicknamed "el pelon," was born to well - known architect Manuel de la Mora y del Castillo Negrete, De la Mora would go on to become one of Mexico's most renowned Modern architects. In 1933, De la Mora graduated from the National School of Architecture as a pupil of José Villagrán Garcia and began his career the following year when he created the design to department store El Puerto de Liverpool in Mexico City.

== Career ==
Initially, Enrique de la Mora worked alongside his brother-in-law constructing several buildings before pursuing a solo career in architectural construction in 1938. He would go on to design and construct more than 70 Catholic sites as a self proclaimed artist and pioneer of Mexican ecclesiastical architecture during the Mexican Modernism Movement. Listed below are three of his most notable works that are still around today.

=== La Purísma Parish ===
In 1940, De la Mora's career would skyrocket after the construction of his design for the Parish of the Immaculate Conception of Mary, or La Purísma Parish, was completed a year later in Monterrey, Mexico. Despite having the same Latin cross base that other Catholic parishes had, the entirely curved roof and walls had never been constructed for such churches before. He worked alongside Spanish - Mexican architect Félix Candela to create these parabolic roofs he is now accredited for, which are known as "shell structures" or cascarones, named after Mexican toys that are emptied egg shells filled with colorful confetti and used for several festivities. However, in order to create such dynamic roofs, one had to have a great understanding of their material. De la Mora knew how to use and manipulate steel and concrete to the point where only a steel frame was needed to carry the weight of the overlaying concrete above without it breaking under pressure. Thus began De la Mora's demand in giving several newer churches a sense of modernity that no other Mexican architect had done previously.

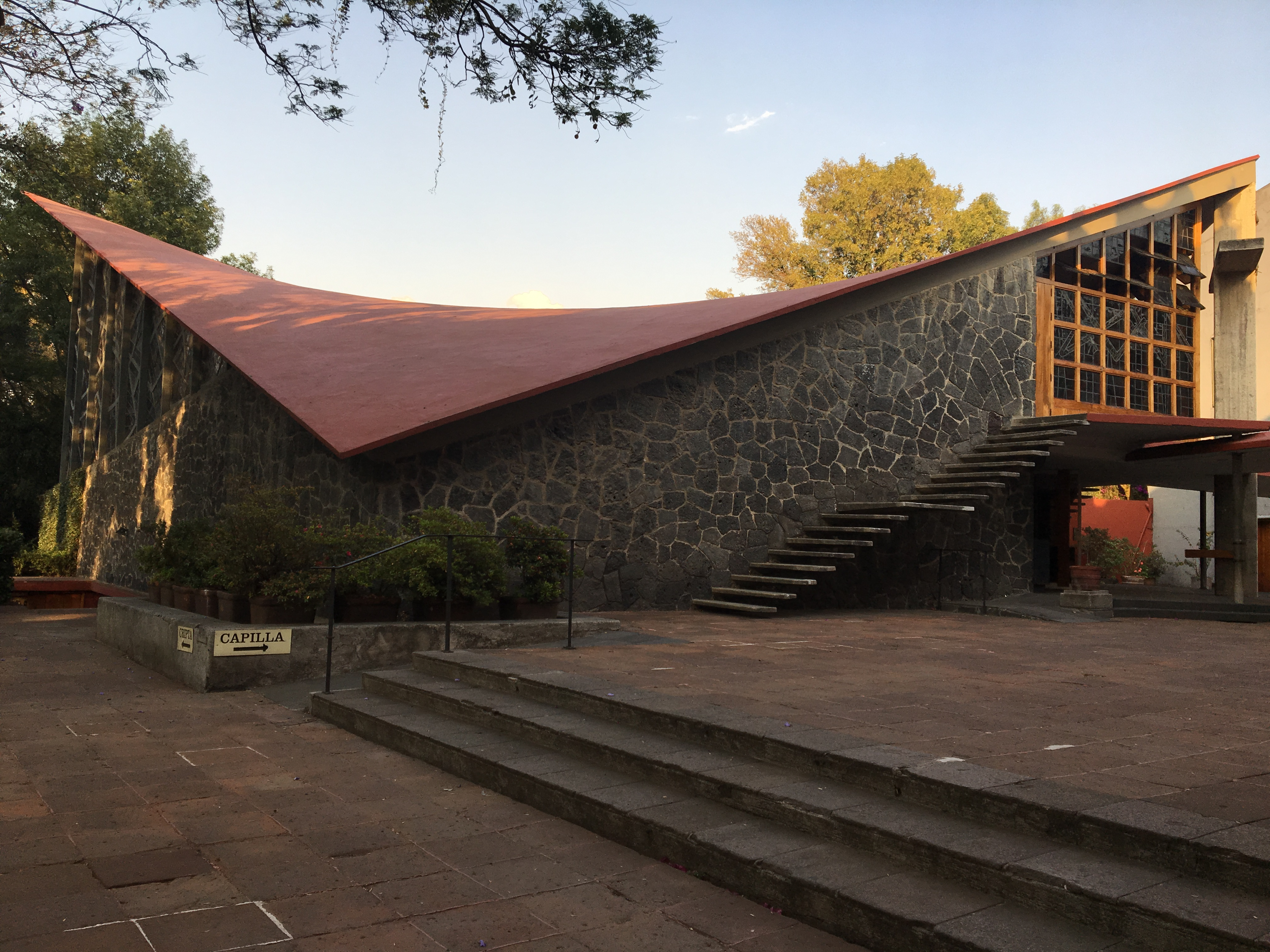
Side view of the Chapel of San José del Altillo by Enrique de la Mora est. 1955

=== Chapel of San José del Altillo ===
One of the churches he was commissioned to build soon after was the Chapel of Our Lady of Soledad, San José del Altillo, now known as the Chapel of Soledad or the Chapel of San José del Altillo, in Mexico City. The drafting of this parish was done in 1955, clearly carrying on De la Mora's dynamic construction of the concave roof and stone walls that hold Kitzia Hofmann's stained glass windows, a Modern Mexican stained glass artist who is known for her work in this chapel.

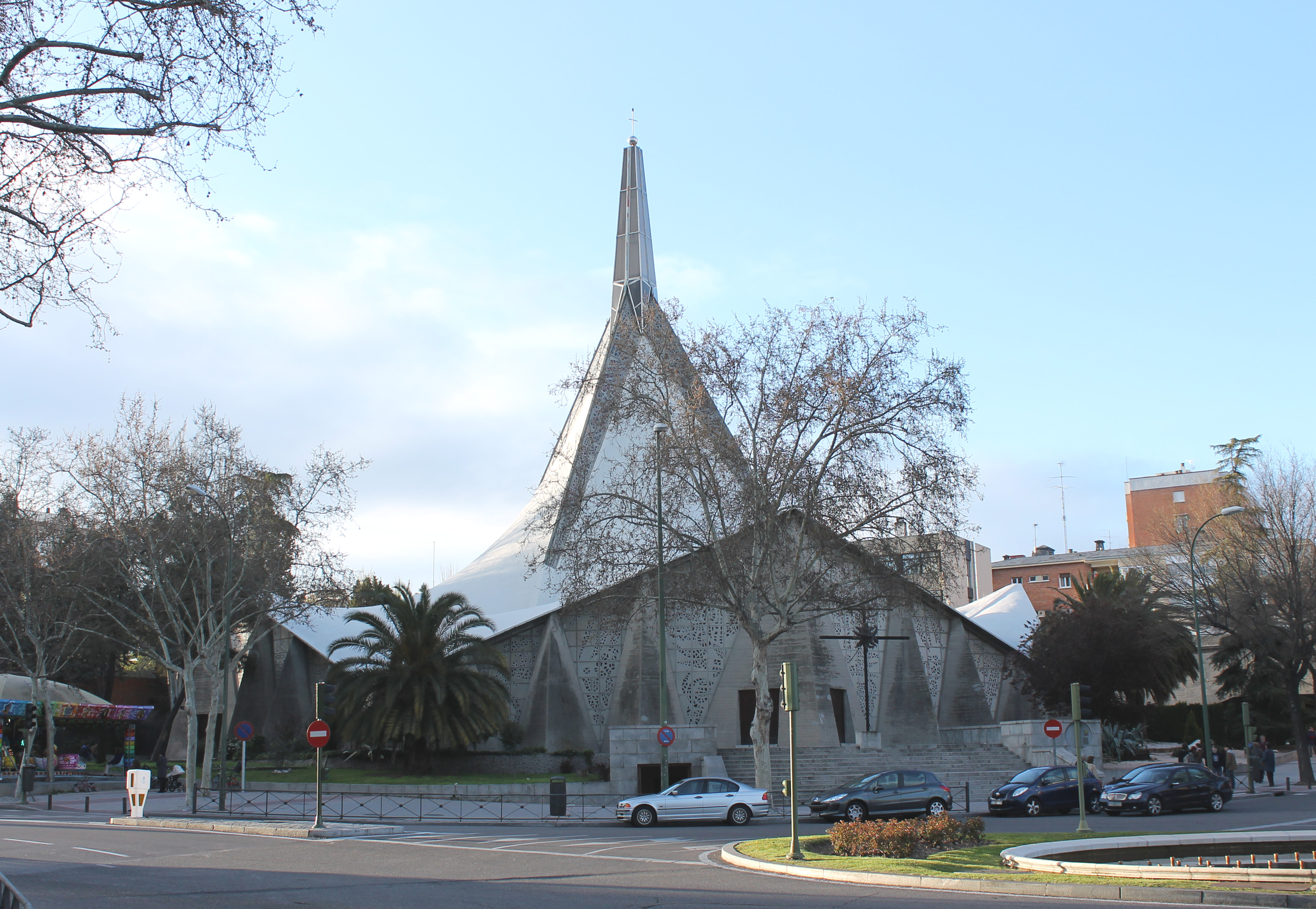
Church of Our Lady of Guadalupe in Madrid by Enrique de la Mora est. circa 1965

=== Our Lady of Guadalupe Parish ===
Originally meant to be built in Monterrey, Mexico, construction for the Sanctuary of Guadalupe, or Our Lady of Guadalupe Parish, was put on hold for several years due to long - distance communication between government officials in Mexico and in Spain. However, when De la Mora and his team were given the finances to travel to Madrid, Spain in order to begin construction, the mayor of Madrid, José Finat y Escrivá de Romaní, spoke against the project. He felt that the modern nature of the blueprints were rather unseemly, but eventually agreed to it due to the encouragement of his Generalissimo who saw it as a way to strengthen bonds between the Spanish and Mexican government. Therefore, the long - awaited construction of Our Lady of Guadalupe Parish finally began in February 1959 and was completed circa 1965.

Once again, Félix Candela worked alongside De la Mora as the project's advisor. The base of this parish was built with reinforced concrete, but in order to get De la Mora's signature lively roof, it had to be lamellar reinforced with 4 centimeter thick concrete. Within the church is a place called the Refuge for Pilgrims which cannot be seen from outside, but only upon entering the building can it be seen. The building then transforms into a body as its main entrance tunnels the viewer's line of sight towards the heart of this private space located down a set of stairs.

== Death & legacy ==
Enrique de la Mora continued to inspire many architects after his death on May 9, 1978. In an interview, modern-day architect Enrique Lastra admitted that he considered De la Mora to be one of the artists during the Modernism Movement he found "heroic," specifically his Seguros Monterrey building constructed circa 1960. Up until his death, De la Mora taught several first generations of students at UNAM as well as the Universidad Iberoamericana. This showed not only his dedication to architectural design, but his dedication in teaching it as well as he created engineering schools such as the Higher School of Engineering and Architecture of the Polytechnic and the Tecnológico de Monterrey built in 1945 which is still around today.

== Selected works ==
- La Purísima (Monterrey, 1939)
- Master plan of the Monterrey Institute of Technology and Higher Education (Monterrey, 1945)
- Faculty of Philosophy and Letters of the National Autonomous University of Mexico, (Mexico City, 1947)
- Rectorate building of the Monterrey Institute of Technology and Higher Education (Monterrey, 1952)
- Mexican Stock Exchange (Mexico City, 1955)
- Nuestra Señora de Guadalupe (Madrid, 1965)

== See also ==
- Mexican Architecture
- Mexican Art
