= León Ávalos y Vez =

León Ávalos y Vez*

1st Director-General of the Monterrey Institute of Technology and Higher Education (ITESM)
- In office 1943–1947
- Succeeded by: Roberto Guajardo Suárez

Personal details
- Born: January 24, 1906 Atlixco, Puebla, Mexico
- Died: 1991 (aged 84–85)
- Spouse: Carolina del Moral (married on 29 November 1935)
- Children: Carolina, León, Teresa, José Luis and María
- Education: National Polytechnic Institute, MIT
- Profession: Mechanical engineer
- Sometimes referred to as León Ávalos Vez

León Ávalos y Vez (24 January 1906 – 1991) was a Mexican mechanical engineer who served as the founding director-general of the Monterrey Institute of Technology (ITESM, 1943–1946) and as director-general of the National School of Electrical and Mechanical Engineering of the National Polytechnic Institute (IPN, 1943).

Ávalos y Vez was born in Atlixco, Puebla, on 24 January 1906 into a family composed by Ignacio Ávalos and Amalia Vez. He received a bachelor's degree in Mechanical Engineering from the National Polytechnic Institute and a master's degree in the same discipline from the Massachusetts Institute of Technology (1929).

== Selected works ==
- Apuntes sobre generadores de vapor (1962).

== See also ==
List of Monterrey Institute of Technology and Higher Education faculty
