= Monterrey Institute of Technology and Higher Education =

Private university in Mexico

- Instituto Tecnológico y de Estudios Superiores de Monterrey
- Motto: Espíritu emprendedor con sentido humano.
- Type: Non-profit Private Organization Research University
- Established: September 6, 1943; 83 years ago
- Founder: Eugenio Garza Sada
- Academic affiliations: SACS, APRU, Universitas 21, ECIU, ANUIES, CUDI, FIMPES, CGU, WUN, Washington University in St. Louis McDonnell International Scholars Academy
- Chairman: Ricardo Saldívar Escajadillo
- President: David Garza Salazar
- Rector: Juan Pablo Murra Lascuraín
- Faculty: 9,916 (2019)
- Students: 91,200 (2019)
- Undergraduates: 57,066 (2019)
- Postgraduates: 6,984 (2019)
- Other students: 27,150 (2019)
- Location: Monterrey, Nuevo León, Mexico
- Campus: 26 across Mexico
- Colors: Blue
- Nickname: Borregos Salvajes
- Mascot: Teus
- Website: tec.mx
- ITESM logo

The Instituto Tecnológico y de Estudios Superiores de Monterrey (ITESM) (English: Monterrey Institute of Technology and Higher Education), commonly known as the Tecnológico de Monterrey (English: Technological (Institute) of Monterrey), as Tec de Monterrey or simply as El Tec, is a private research university based in Monterrey, Nuevo León, Mexico. It has expanded to include 35 campuses across 25 cities in the country and 22 liaison offices in 15 other countries.

The university was founded in 1943 by Eugenio Garza Sada, who was educated at MIT in the United States. Eugenio Garza Sada was an industrialist and philanthropist from Monterrey.

ITESM was the first university outside the U.S. to establish an internet connection in the Western Hemisphere, linking the University of Texas at San Antonio directly.

== History ==
=== Early years ===
The institute was founded on September 6, 1943, by a group of local businessmen led by Eugenio Garza Sada, a moneyed heir of a brewing conglomerate who was interested in creating an institution that could provide highly skilled personnel — both university graduates and technicians— to the booming Monterrey corporations of the 1940s. The group was structured into a non-profit organization called Enseñanza e Investigación Superior A.C. (EISAC) and recruited several academicians led by León Ávalos y Vez, an MIT alumnus and then director-general of the School of Electrical and Mechanical Engineering of the National Polytechnic Institute, who designed its first academic programs and served as its first director-general.

In its early years the Institute operated at Abasolo 858 Oriente in a large, two-story house located a block and a half away from Zaragoza Square, behind the city's Metropolitan Cathedral. As these facilities soon proved to be insufficient, it started renting out adjacent buildings and by 1945 it became apparent that a university campus was necessary. For that reason, a master plan was commissioned to Enrique de la Mora and on February 3, 1947, what would later be known as its Monterrey Campus was inaugurated by Mexican President Miguel Alemán Valdés.

Because the operations of the local companies were highly reliant on U.S. markets, investments, and technology; internationalization became one of its earliest priorities. In 1950 it became the first foreign university in history to be accredited by the Southern Association of Colleges and Schools (SACS), one of the six regional accreditation agencies recognized by the United States Department of Education. Its foreign accreditation would end up being a decisive influence in its development, as it was forced to submit itself to external evaluation earlier than most Mexican universities (1967) and unlocked additional sources of revenue, such as tuition funds from foreign students interested in taking summer courses in Mexico for full-academic credit.

=== Expansion ===
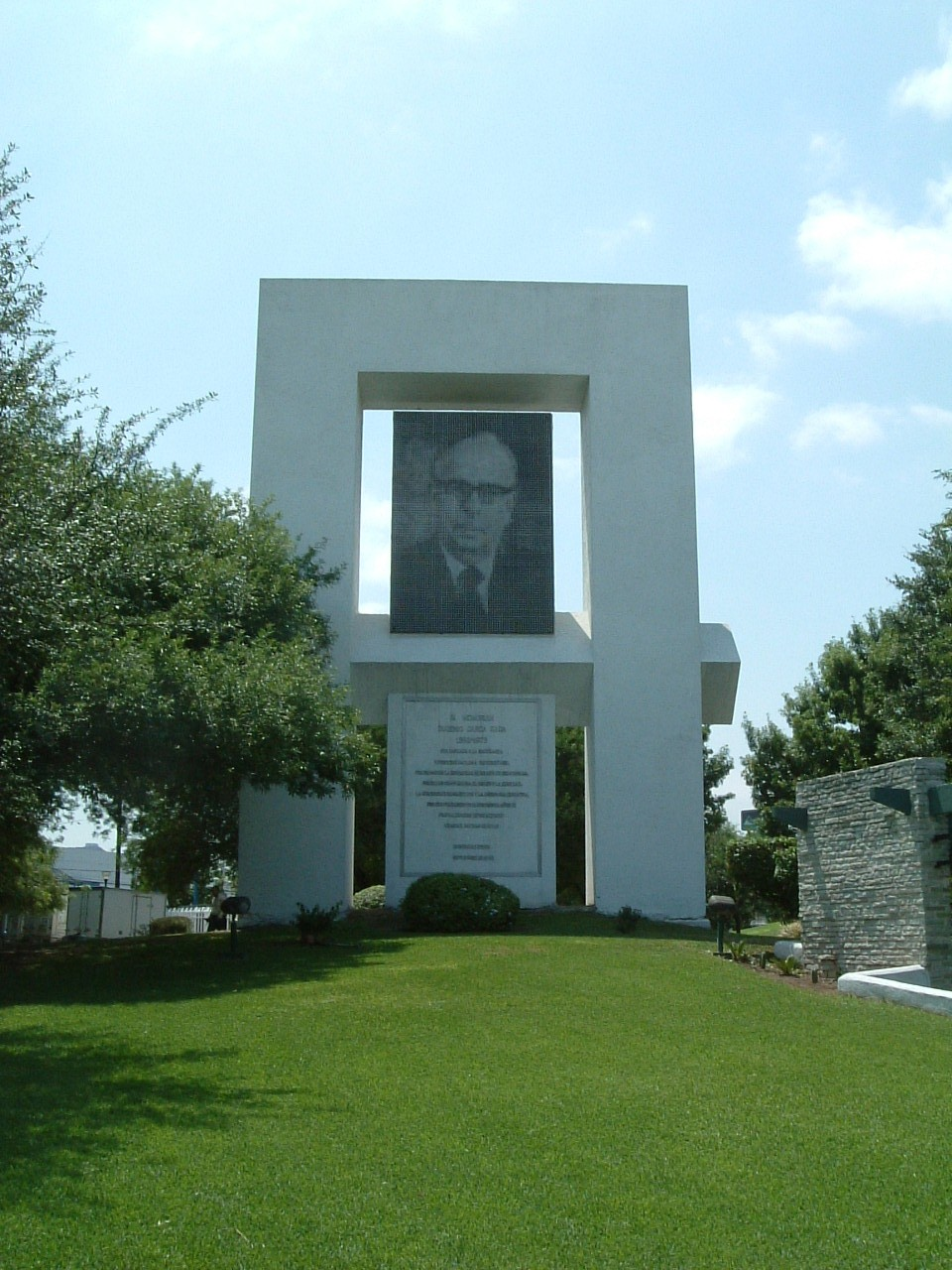
The Eugenio Garza Sada Memorial honors the institute's chief founder and promoter at the Monterrey Campus.

Its growth outside the city of Monterrey began in the late-1960s, when both its rector and head of academics lobbied for expansion. A first attempt, funded a few years earlier by several businessmen from Mexicali, Baja California, was staffed and organized by the Institute but faced opposition from the Board of Trustees once the federal government refused any additional subsidy and members of the Board cast doubt on its ability to get funds as an out-of-state university. At the end the project was renamed Centro de Enseñanza Técnica y Superior (CETYS) and grew into a fully independent institution.

Aside from the CETYS experiment and the 150 hectares bought in 1951 for the agricultural program's experimental facilities in nearby Apodaca, Nuevo León, no other expansion outside Monterrey was attempted until 1967, when a school of maritime studies was built in the port of Guaymas, Sonora. Shortly thereafter, premises were built in Obregón and courses began to be offered in Mexico City. Those premises and the ones that followed, then called external units, were fully dependent on the Monterrey Campus until 1984, when they were restructured as semi-independent campuses and reorganized in regional rectorates (see Organization).

In 1987, when the Southern Association of Colleges and Schools demanded faculty members with master's degrees to lecture 100% of its undergraduate courses, the Institute invested considerably in both distance learning and computer network technologies and training, effectively becoming, on February 1, 1989, the first university ever connected to the Internet in both Latin America and the Spanish-speaking world. Such efforts contributed to the creation of its former Virtual University a few years later and allowed it to become the first country-code top level domain registry in Mexico; first by itself from 1989 to 1995, and then as a major shareholder of NIC Mexico, the current national registry.

== Campuses ==
The institute has campuses in twenty-five Mexican cities (see: Campuses by region).

There are thirty-one campuses of the Institute distributed in twenty-five Mexican cities. Each campus is relatively independent but shares a national academic curriculum (see Academics). The flagship campus is located in Monterrey, where the national, system-wide rectorate is located. Most of them deliver both high school and undergraduate education, some offer postgraduate programs and only eight (Cumbres, Eugenio Garza Sada, Eugenio Garza Lagüera, Santa Catarina, Metepec, Santa Anita, Esmeralda and Valle Alto) deliver high school courses exclusively. Nevertheless, curricular and extension courses and seminars are usually available at most facilities.

=== Campuses by region ===
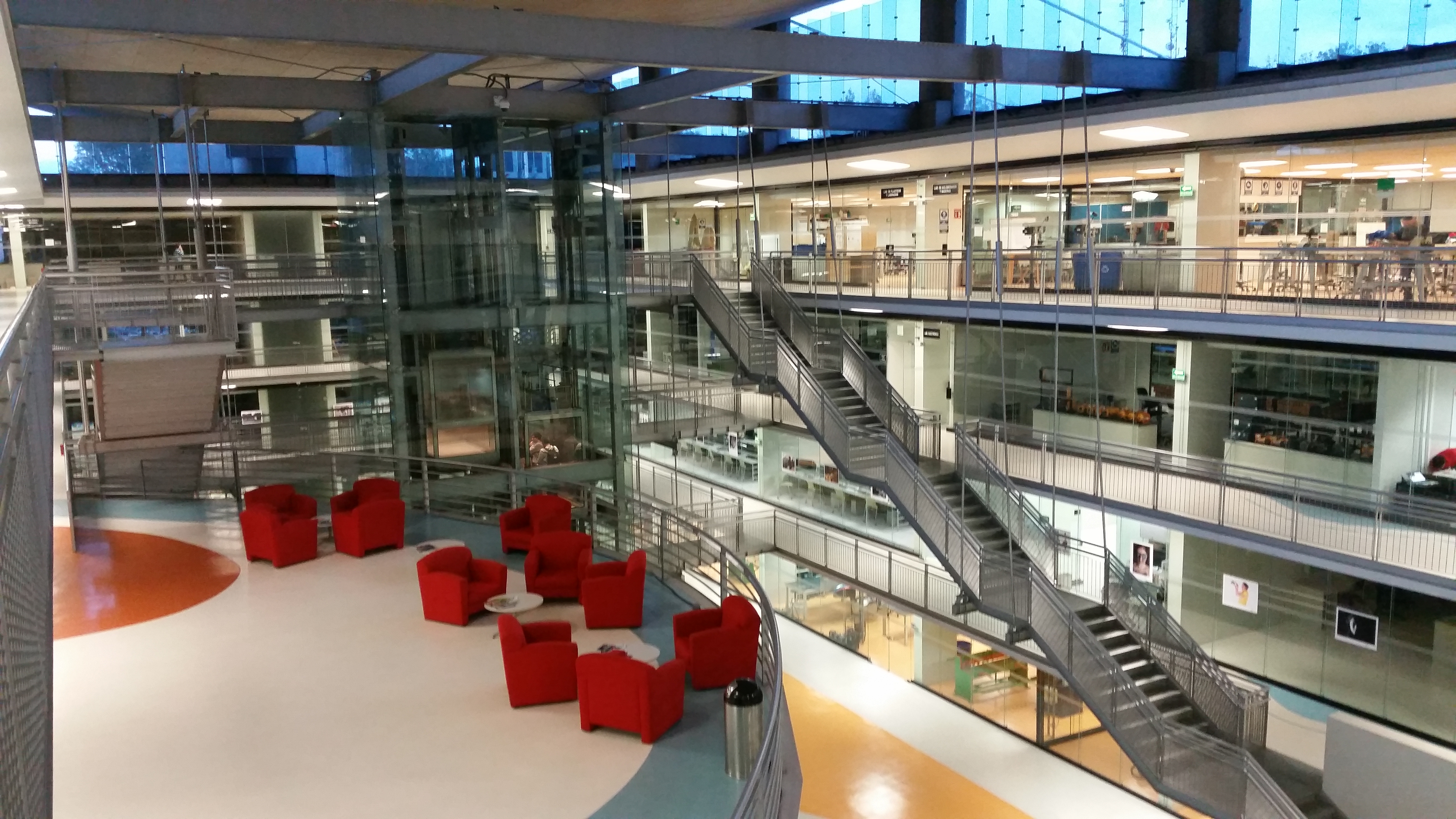
ITESM Mexico City Campus – CEDETEC building

Former campuses include Celaya (Prepa Tec, closed in 2020), Veracruz (closed in 2021), Guaymas (transferred to TecMilenio University in the early 2000s) and Mazatlán (transferred to TecMilenio University in 2009).

- North: Monterrey, PrepaTec Cumbres, PrepaTec Eugenio Garza Lagüera, PrepaTec Eugenio Garza Sada, Prepa Tec Santa Catarina, PrepaTec Valle Alto, Aguascalientes, Chihuahua, Ciudad Juárez, Laguna, Saltillo, Tampico and Zacatecas.
- Centro: Mexico City, Santa Fe, State of Mexico, PrepaTec Esmeralda, Toluca
- South: Chiapas, Cuernavaca, Hidalgo, PrepaTec Metepec, Puebla
- West: Colima, Guadalajara, Irapuato, León, Morelia, PrepaTec Navojoa, Northern Sonora, Obregón, Querétaro, San Luis Potosí, PrepaTec Santa Anita and Sinaloa.

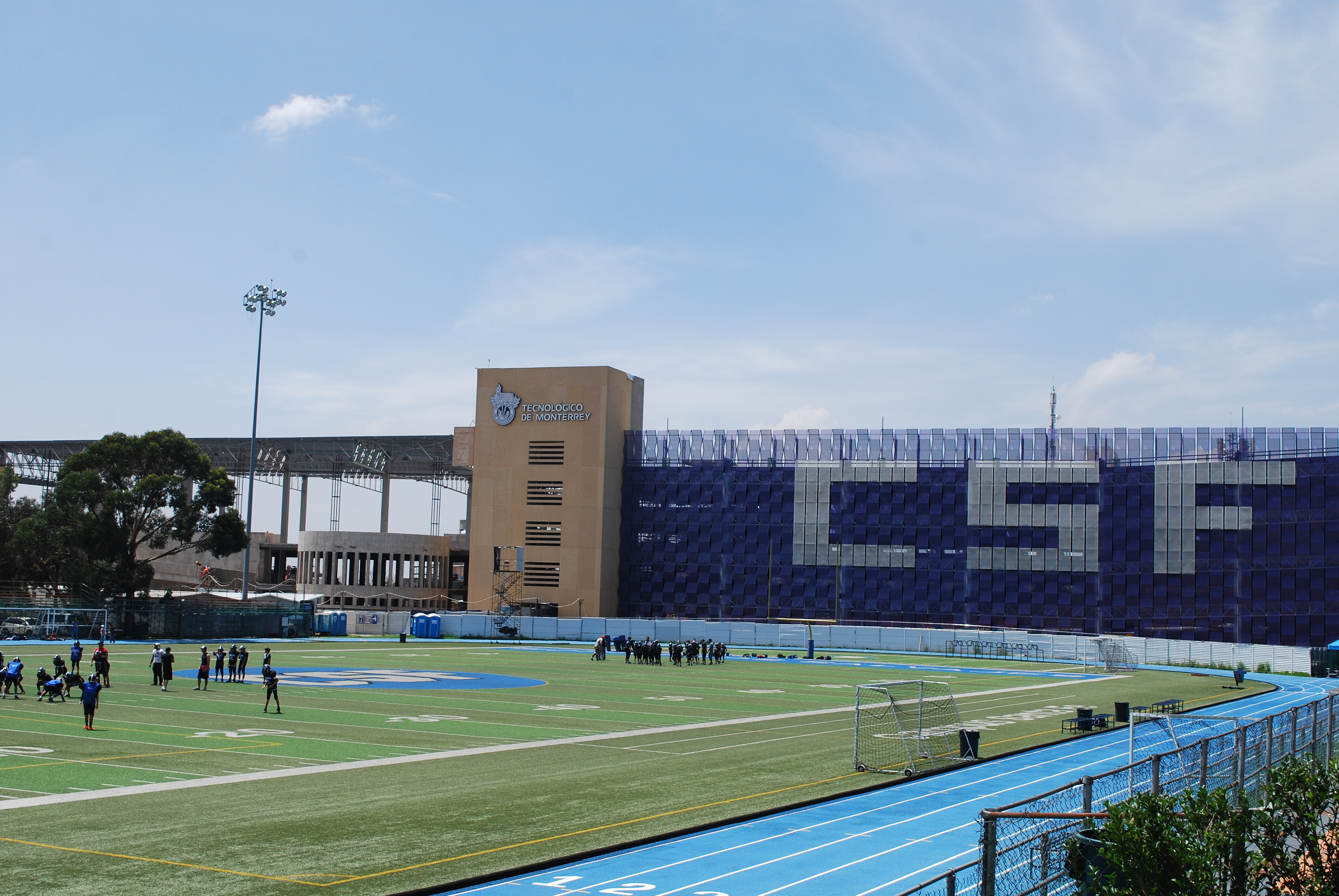
ITESM – Santa Fe Campus

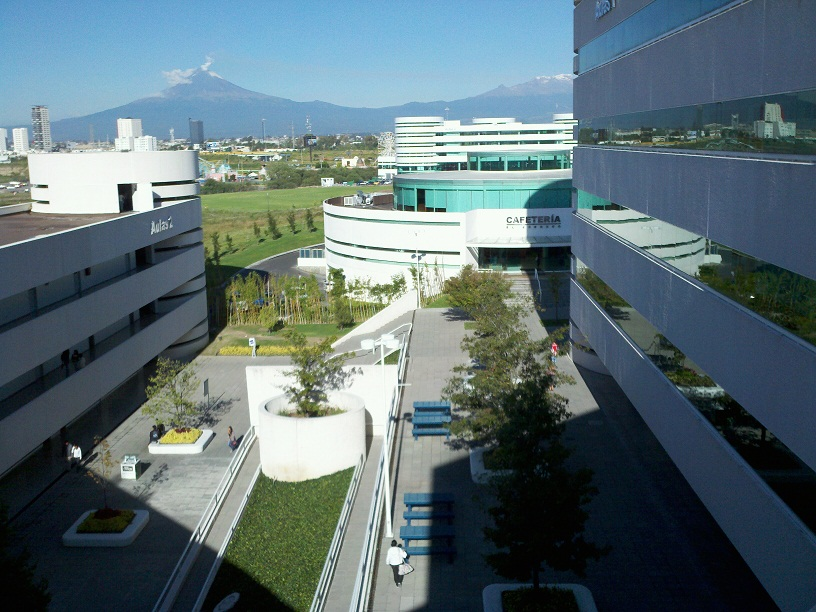
ITESM – Puebla City Campus

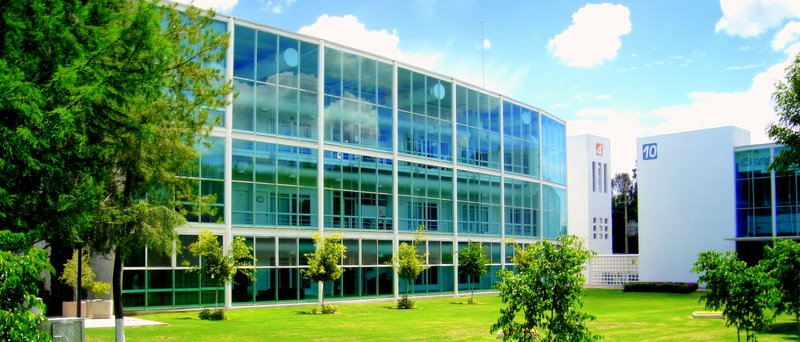
ITESM – Querétaro City Campus

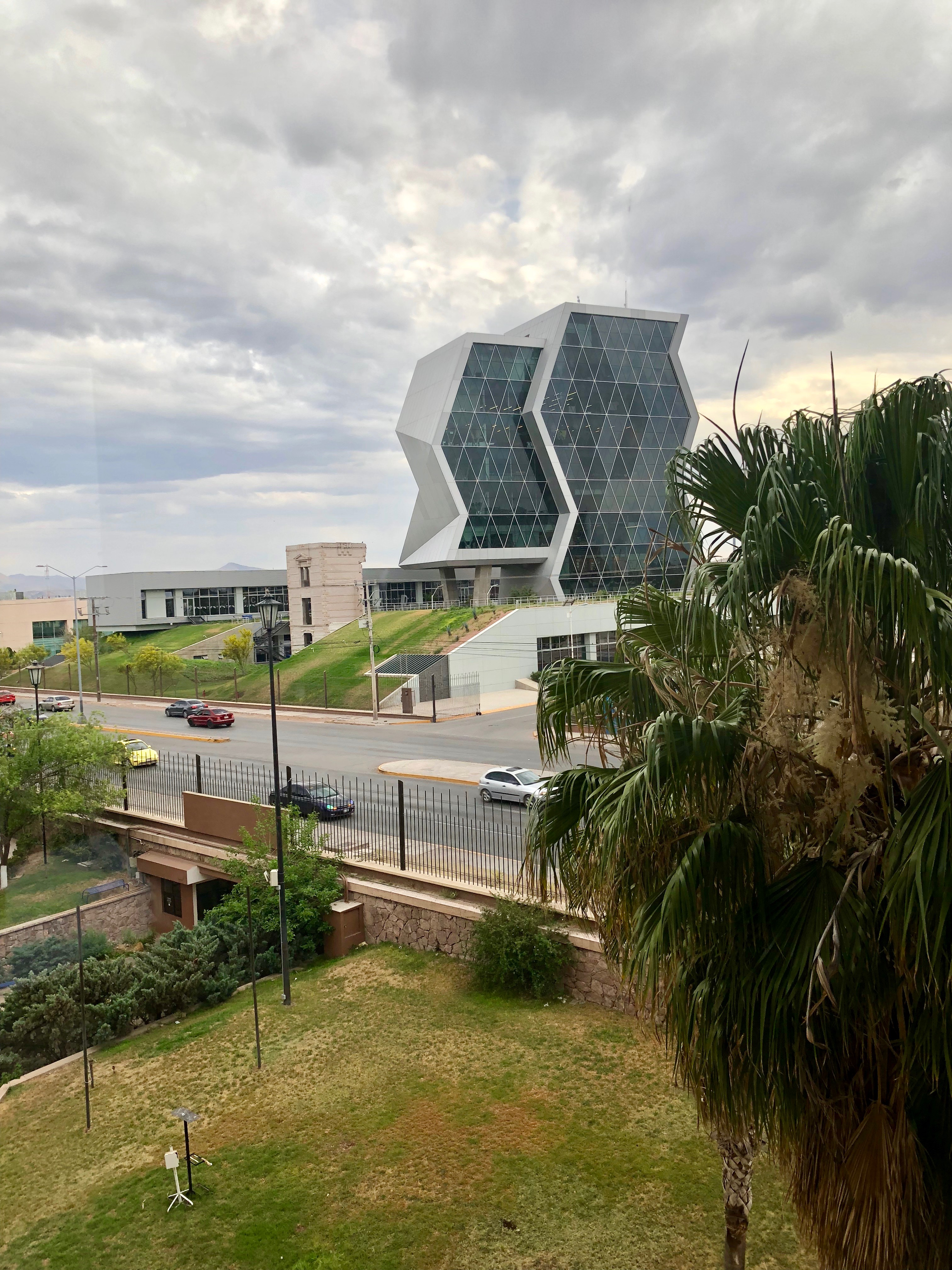
The Innovation and Technical and Technology Transfer Park (PIT3) at Chihuahua Campus

As of June 2019, campuses were divided into the following Mexican regions:

=== Other infrastructure ===
In addition to the campuses, the Institute manages:

- The Ignacio A. Santos Medical School, the Hospital San José and the Zambrano-Hellion Medical Center.
- Eight international sites in Argentina (Buenos Aires), Colombia (Bogotá, Medellín), Ecuador (Guayaquil and Quito), Panama (Panama City), Peru (Lima) and the United States (Miami) offering extension courses, research and international consulting.
- Fifteen liaison offices in charge of forging international partnerships and negotiating professional internships and academic exchanges with local universities, companies and civil institutions. Current liaison offices are located in Belgium (Brussels), Canada (Montreal and Vancouver), China (Beijing, Guangzhou and Shanghai), France (Nice and Paris), Italy (Florence, Macerata and Verona), Switzerland (Fribourg), Spain (Barcelona and Madrid) and the United States (Boston, Dallas and Washington, D.C.)

== Organization ==
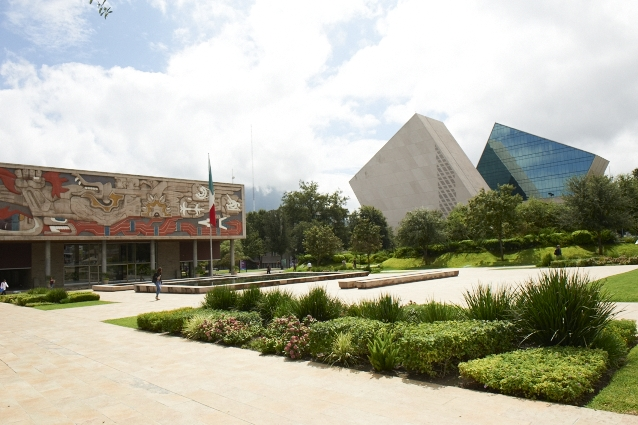
The Rectorate (left) and the CETEC towers at the Monterrey Campus.

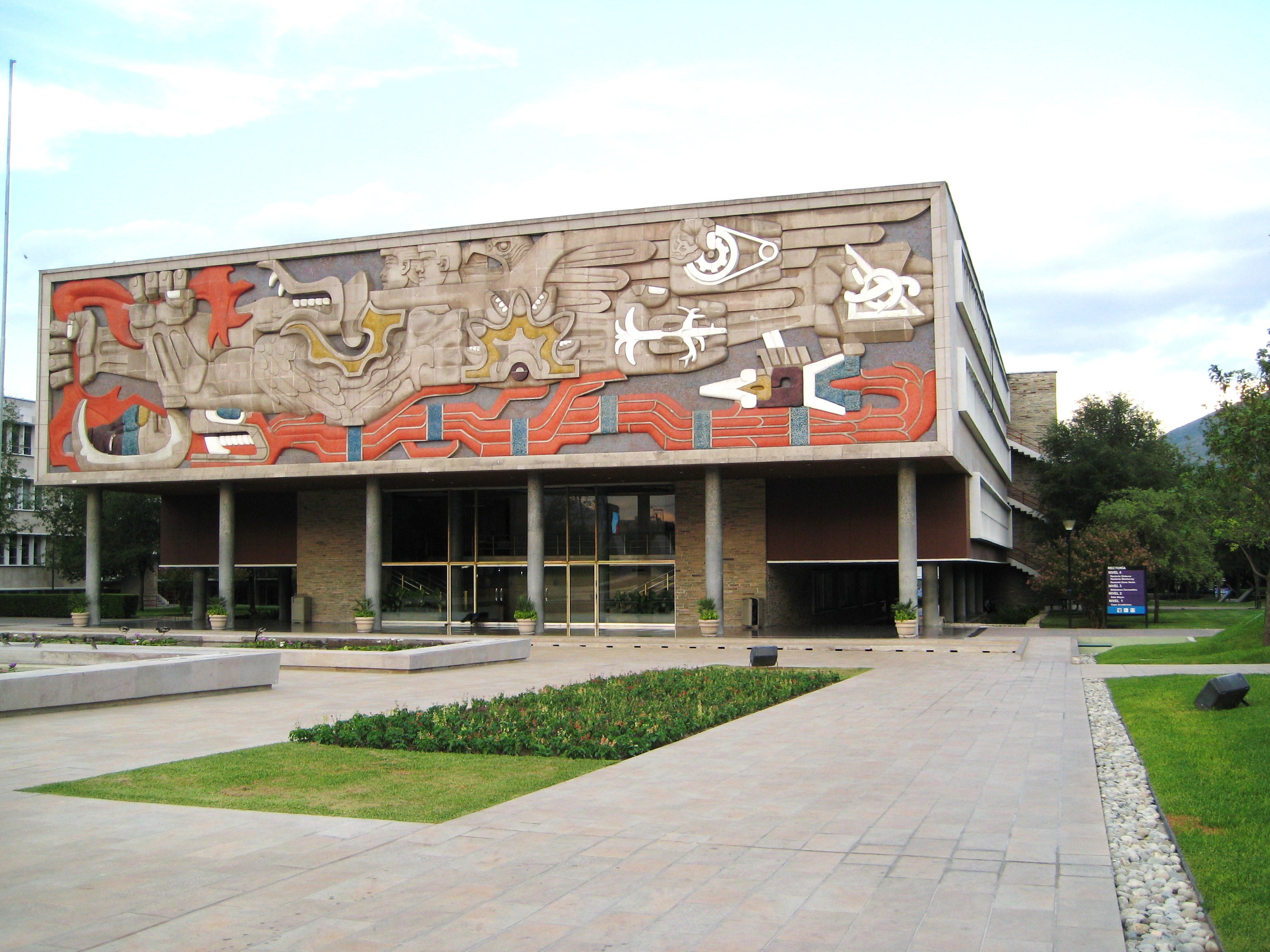
The Old Library Building, current Rectorate, was designed by Enrique de la Mora, displays a bas relief by Jorge González Camarena and holds one of the largest collections of Don Quixote incunabula, an original edition of L'Encyclopédie and other bibliographical treasures.

All campuses are sponsored by non-profit organizations composed primarily of local businesspeople. The Monterrey Campus is sponsored by Enseñanza e Investigación Superior, A.C. (EISAC), which co-sponsored the system as a whole until a newly built organization, Instituto Tecnológico y de Estudios Superiores de Monterrey, A.C. (ITESM AC) overtook those responsibilities. Such organizations (effectively serving as boards of trustees) are responsible for electing the rectors or directors of a particular campus. Since February 2012, the president of ITESMAC is José Antonio Fernández, a class of 1976 alumnus and current chairman and CEO of FEMSA. Former presidents include the founder, Eugenio Garza Sada (1943–73) and his son, Eugenio Garza Lagüera (1973–97), and Lorenzo Zambrano (1997–2012), a class of 1966 alumnus and until his passing.

Former heads of the Institute include:

- León Ávalos y Vez (1943–1947) first director-general.
- Roberto Guajardo Suárez (1947–1951) second director-general.
- Víctor Bravo Ahuja (1951–1958) third director-general, and from April 11, 1955, first rector.
- Fernando García Roel (1959–1984) second rector.
- Rafael Rangel Sostmann (1985–2011) third rector.
- Salvador Alva (2011–2019) fourth rector and Executive President.

Since 2020, The Tecnológico de Monterrey Rector and Executive President is David Garza Salazar.

=== High schools ===
Following the historical trend of Mexico's largest universities, the Institute sponsors several high schools which are united under the name "HighPoint International School". This high schools share one or more national curricula: bicultural, multicultural and/or International Baccalaureate, which is administered from Geneva, Switzerland. The bicultural focuses on better understanding of the English language, the multicultural program requires studying a third language and to have an exchange program abroad. Finally, the IB is an academically challenging program where students can obtain the IB Diploma when they graduate. Additionally, students can receive college credits both at the TEC and universities abroad. Multicultural students are able to take IB courses if they wish with the focus on obtaining IB Subject Certificates. As of December 2017, over 26,000 students in several campuses were registered as high school students within the system.

== Academics ==
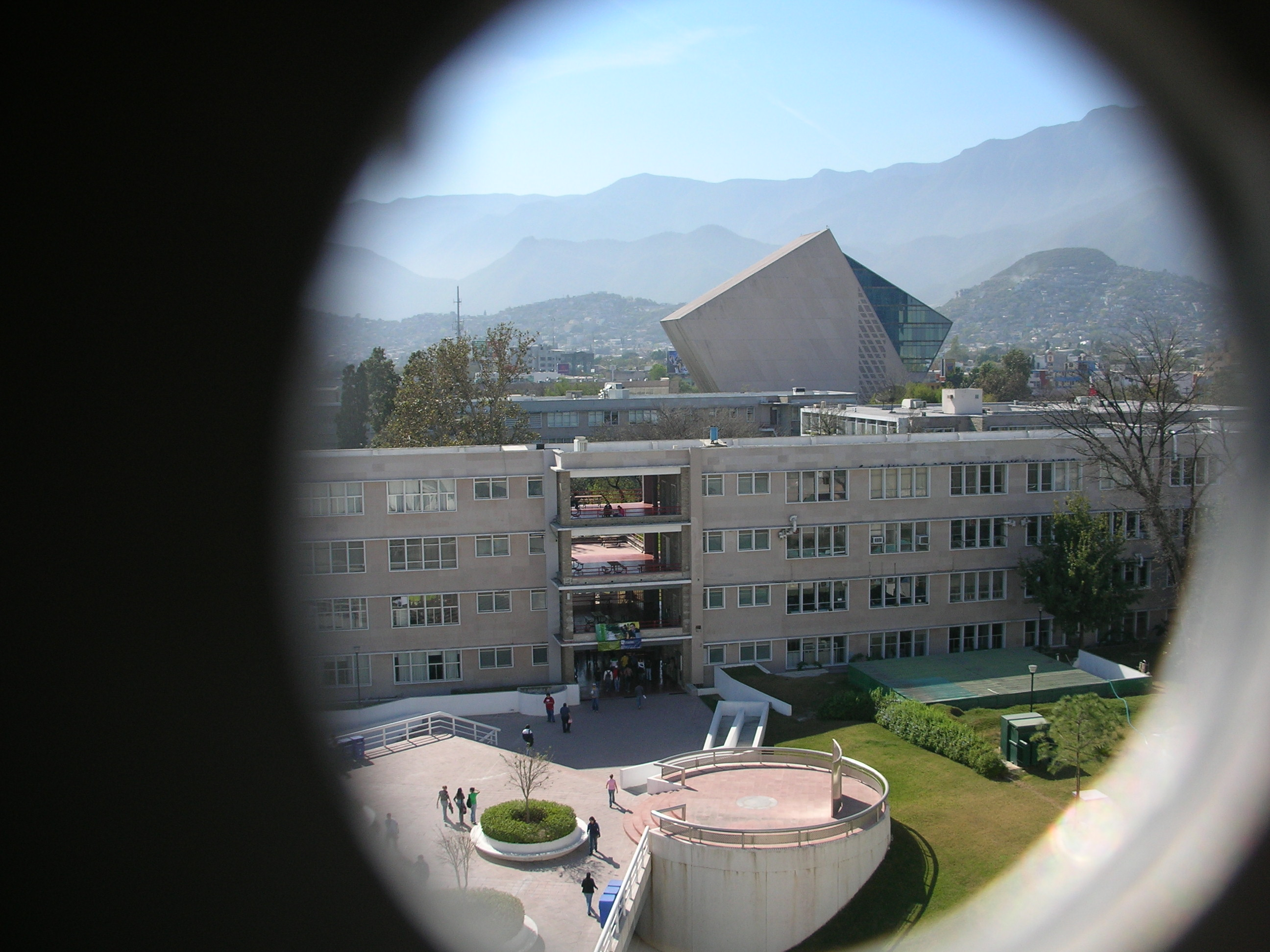
The oldest academic building in the Monterrey Campus, Aulas I, and the towers of the Center of Advanced Production Technology (CETEC), which house several research centers

Academically, the university is organized into several departments and divisions —as opposed to the traditional faculty school scheme used by most Mexican public universities— and it was the first Mexican university in history to divide the academic year in semesters. Current academic calendar for both high school and undergraduate students is composed of two semesters running from August to December and from January to May (each lasting 16 weeks) and an optional summer session from June to July, where at most two courses can be taken in an intensive basis.

As of 2010, the institute offers 57 undergraduate degrees, of which 37 are taught in English and are generally awarded after nine semesters of study (except for Medicine and Architecture); 33 master's degrees, generally lasting three to five semesters (and can also be structured in three-months terms), and 11 doctorate degrees varying in length according to their academic field.

=== Admissions ===
Since 1969 the Institute requires every college applicant to achieve a minimum pass mark at an academic aptitude test which is 900 out of 1600. (Prueba de Aptitud Académica, PAA) delivered by The College Board, a not-for-profit examination board in the United States. However, each campus is free to request additional requirements; such as a grade average of 80 or 90 in high school (on a 100-point scale) for those willing to transfer or apply to the Monterrey Campus. As for the graduate schools, the requirements may vary according to the discipline, such as a grade average of 80/100 and 550-points in both the GMAT and the TOEFL for some programs at its Graduate Business School (EGADE).

=== Accreditations ===
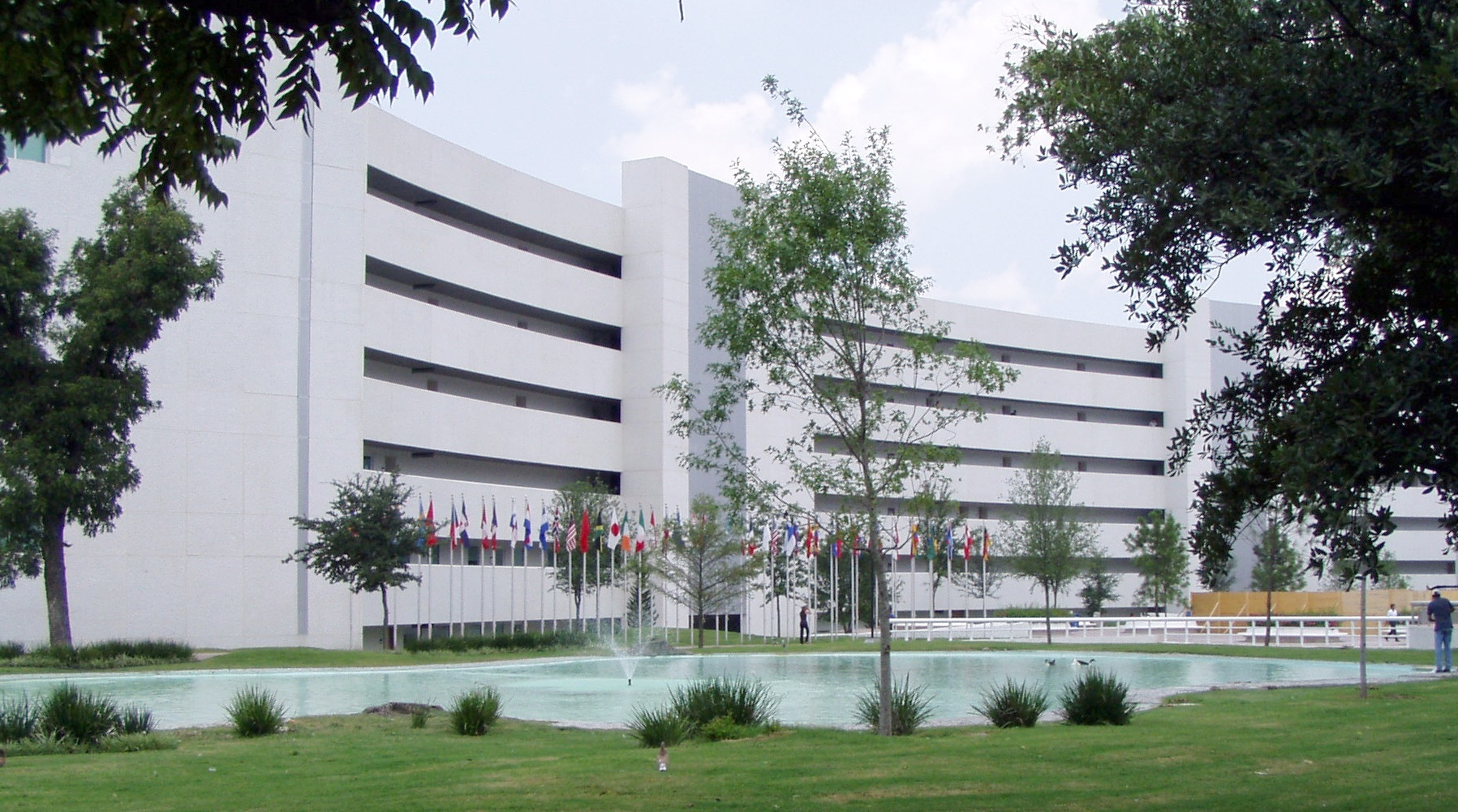
The International Center for Advanced Learning (CIAP)

Studies at the institute are officially accredited by the Secretariat of Public Education of Mexico (Secretaría de Educación Pública, SEP) and by the Southern Association of Colleges and Schools (SACS) of the United States. In November 2008, its graduate business school (EGADE) became one of the 34 business schools in the world to hold simultaneous accreditation of its programs by the AACSB of the United States, the Association of MBAs of the United Kingdom and the European Quality Improvement System (EQUIS) while the Institute became the first Latin American university in history to receive full-accreditation on some of its engineering programs by ABET (as opposed to the traditional substantially-equivalent designation given to most schools outside the United States).

The quality of its programs is also audited by the Institute of Food Technologists, the Association for Public Policy Analysis and Management and by the national accrediting councils of Mexico, such as the Council for Higher Education Accreditation (Consejo para la Acreditación de la Educación Superior, COPAES) and the Inter-Institutional Committees for Higher Education Evaluation (Comités Interinstitucionales de Evaluación de la Educación Superior, CIEES).

As of 2017, 169 undergraduate degrees were accredited by national accrediting councils and 36 were accredited by international accrediting agencies. As for graduate degrees, 11 were accredited by international accrediting agencies and 58 were listed in the National Census of High-Quality Postgraduate Studies (Padrón Nacional de Posgrados de Calidad, PNPC) by the National Council for Science and Technology (CONACYT).

=== Academic memberships ===
The institute is the only Latin American institution at the European Consortium of Innovative Universities (ECIU) —an organization committed to innovations in both teaching and learning— and at Universitas 21; an international network of research-intensive universities established as an "international reference point and resource for strategic thinking on issues of global significance." It is also the only Mexican university, along the National Autonomous University of Mexico, to be enrolled at the Association of Pacific Rim Universities, an international consortium of leading research universities including Stanford University, University of California, Berkeley and Caltech. The institute was also the first private university to become a member of the National Association of Universities and Institutions of Higher Education of Mexico (ANUIES) back when it was composed entirely by public universities (1958) and is a full member of the Mexican Federation of Private Institutions of Higher Education (Federación de Instituciones Mexicanas Particulares de Educación Superior, FIMPES). The university recently became a partner of Washington University in St. Louis through the McDonnell International Scholars Academy.

=== Faculty ===
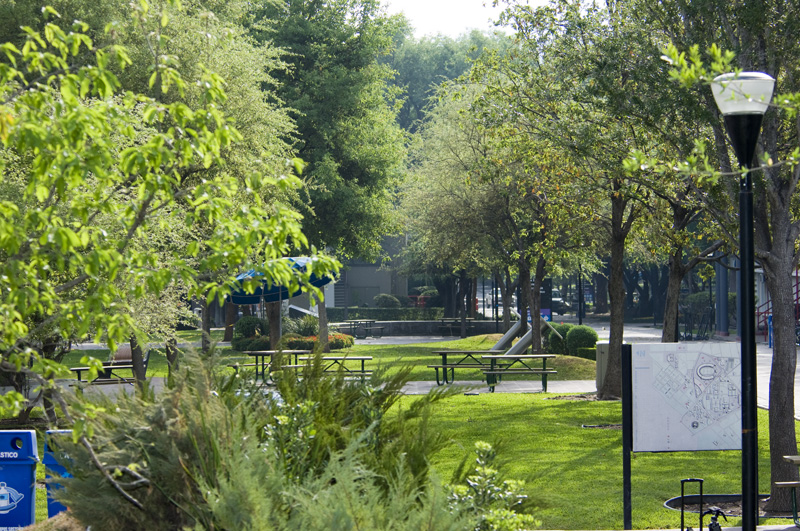
Sustainable Campus

The institute has over 10,000 professors at high school, undergraduate and postgraduate levels: 2,207 tenured and 7,900 associated professors, and all of them have the appropriate academic credentials to lecture at their corresponding academic level according to the Southern Association of Colleges and Schools. As of 2017 some 470 professors taught courses, worked in international projects or attended seminars or congresses at foreign universities while some 590 foreign professors taught courses at the institute. As for their academic development, its faculty training program was bestowed with the 2004 Andrew Heiskell Award for Innovation in International Education by the Institute of International Education.

=== Libraries ===
The institute has at least thirty-three libraries in twenty-five Mexican cities holding over 2.4 million books, publications, and 46 types of electronic databases with at least 51,000 specialized magazines and academic journals and over 9000 e-books. Its Cervantean Library, named after Miguel de Cervantes and located in the current rectorate, holds one of the largest collections of Don Quixote incunabula, an original edition of L'Encyclopédie, and the Mario Pani Archives, and other bibliographical treasures while the main library of the Monterrey Campus holds the personal collections of archaeologist Ignacio Bernal.

=== Rankings ===
University rankings

Global – Overall
- ARWU World: 801–900 (2022)
- QS World: =184 (2024)
- THE World: 601–800 (2024)
- USNWR Global: =759 (2023)

World Ranking
	2014	2015	2016	2017	2018	2019	2020	2021	2022	2023	2024	2025
QS	279	253	238	206	199	178	158	155	161	170	184	185

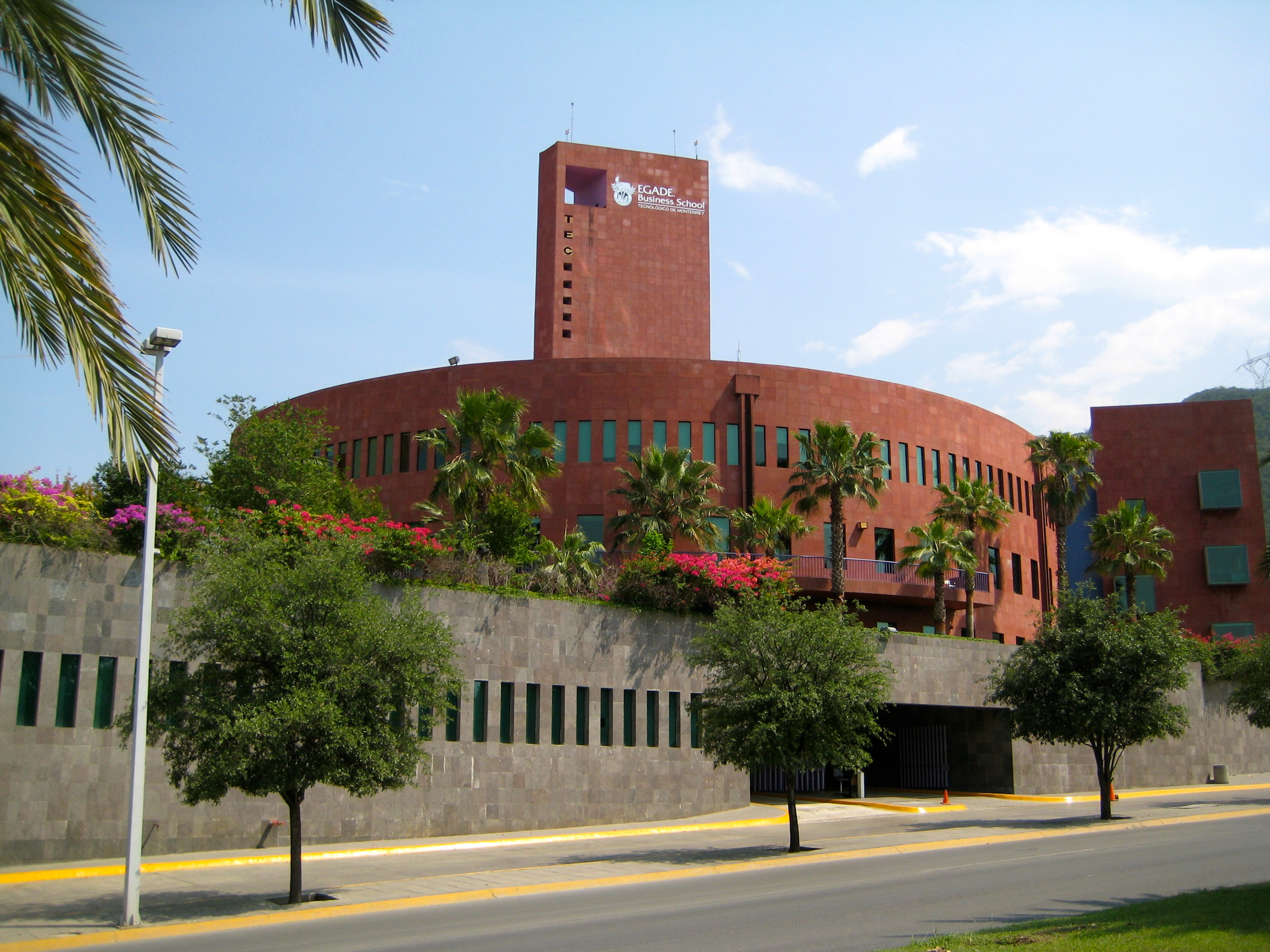
Its graduate business school, EGADE, in Monterrey, Mexico

Overall, the institute is the only Mexican university besides the National Autonomous University of Mexico to be ranked at the 2010 QS World University Rankings, in which it was classified #65 worldwide at its Employer's Review, #269 in Engineering and Information Technology, #232 in Social Sciences and #387 at its overall ranking. In the 2010 International Professional Ranking of World Universities, developed by the École nationale supérieure des mines de Paris, it ranked 224 out of 390 worldwide.

Among its graduate schools, EGADE has been ranked 7th among the best business schools outside the United States according to the Wall Street Journal (2006), 4th in the world in business ethics and social-responsibility programs according to BusinessWeek magazine (2005), among the 100 best graduate business schools in the world by the Economist Intelligence Unit (2009) and its OneMBA program, delivered in partnership with four different institutions (see Joint programs and international partnerships below) was ranked 27 worldwide by the Financial Times in its 2009 Executive Master in Business Administration rankings.

=== Joint programs and international partnerships ===
Student-created video documenting Tec's collaboration with Wikipedia

Some of its academic programs are offered as joint degrees or in partnership with foreign universities:

- Its Master of Science in Information Technology is offered as a joint degree with Carnegie-Mellon University, which is ranked 4th for graduate studies in computer science in 2008 according to U.S. News & World Report and 7th in Engineering/Technology and Computer Sciences among Shanghai Jiao Tong University's world's top 100 universities.

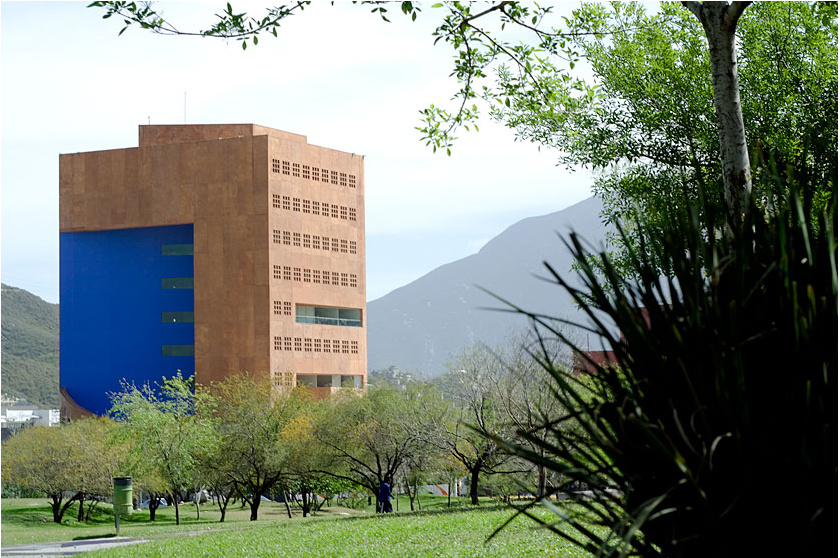
Ricardo Legorreta designed the EGAP CEMEX building, which houses the Graduate School of Public Administration and Public Policy, at San Pedro Garza García, a suburb of Monterrey.

- The OneMBA degree is offered through a partnership with the University of North Carolina at Chapel Hill, the Rotterdam School of Management of the Netherlands, the Chinese University of Hong Kong and the Getulio Vargas Foundation of Brazil and is ranked 27 worldwide among executive MBAs by the Financial Times.
- The B.A. Finance and Accounting is offered as a joint degree with the University of Texas at Austin, Master in Professional Accounting, ranked #1 Graduate Accounting School in the U.S. by U.S. News & World Report since 2007.
- The Bachelor of Science in Industrial Engineering is offered in partnership with the Université de Technologie de Troyes in France and with the Université Laval in Quebec, Canada.
- The Global MBA for Latin American Managers is offered in partnership with the Thunderbird School of Global Management, which has been ranked consistently by U.S. News & World Report as the #1 school in International Management since 1995.
- The medical degree is offered as a dual Ph.D. program with the Graduate School of Biomedical Sciences of the Texas A&M Health Science Center.
- An International MBA program is offered as a joint degree with the University of San Diego.
- The institute has a strategic partnership with Johns Hopkins Hospital through Johns Hopkins Medicine International.
- The Master of Business Administration with a concentration in Global Business and Strategy (MBA-GBS) is a double degree MBA program jointly offered by the Graduate School of Business Administration and Leadership (EGADE) at the Tecnológico de Monterrey, Campus Monterrey, and the Belk College of Business (Belk College) at the University of North Carolina at Charlotte.
- The bachelor's degrees in Chemical Engineering are offered as joint degrees with the Reutlingen University of Germany.
- Several ITESM high schools offer the International Baccalaureate Diploma Programme, which is administered by the Geneva-based International Baccalaureate.
- The school partners with New York City-based Trilogy Education Services to host a tech training program on ITESM's Mexico campus.

== Medical school ==
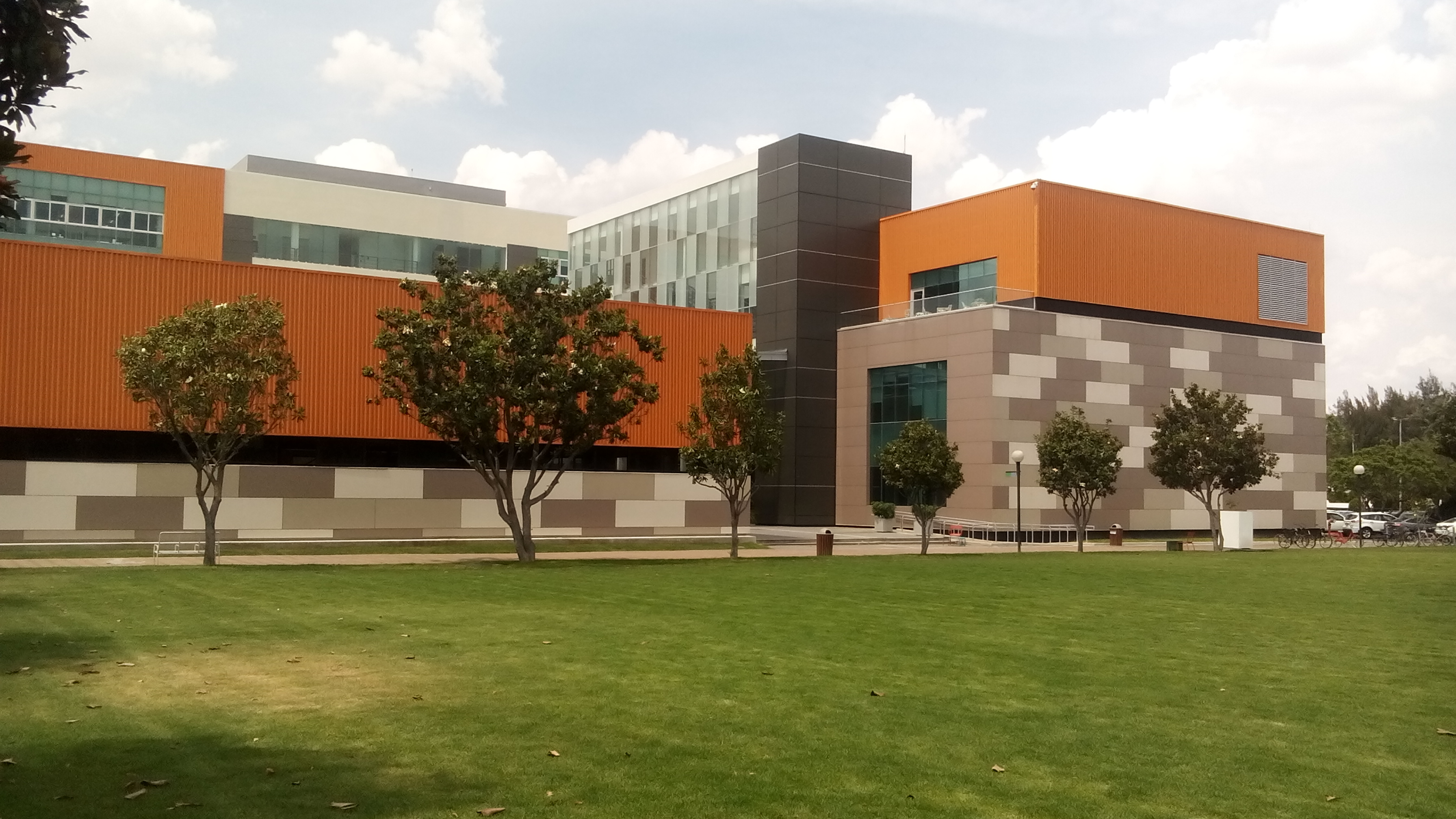
ITESM campus Guadalajara

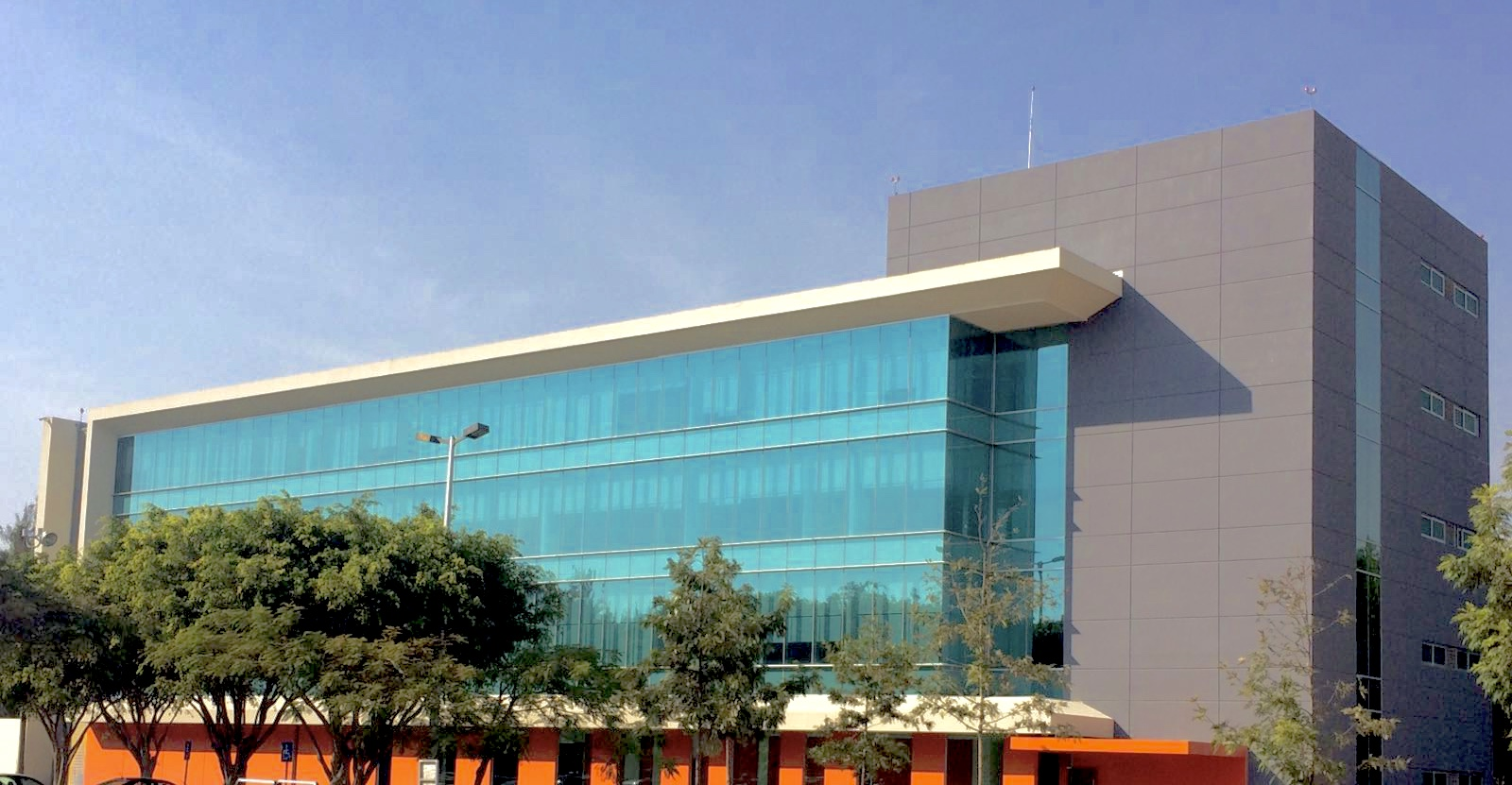
Ignacio A. Santos School of Medicine, in the Guadalajara Campus

The Ignacio A. Santos School of Medicine (Escuela de Medicina Ignacio A. Santos, aka: EMIS) is the medical school division of the Monterrey Institute of Technology and Higher Education (ITESM). Established in 1978 in Monterrey, Mexico.

The School of Medicine was founded to satisfy the country's need for high quality medical training and innovation in biomedical research. Currently, there are approximately 500 students enrolled in the M.D. program and about 105 postgraduate students. Aside from the medical doctor program, the School of Medicine also offers a joint M.D.-Ph.D. program with Houston Methodist Hospital, MD Anderson Cancer Center, Texas A&M Health Science Center, and other Bachelors in Biosciences, Nutrition Sciences and Biomedical Engineering. The graduate medical education department offers several medical residency and fellowship programs. The general director of the TecSalud organization is Guillermo Torre M.D. PhD, a cardiologist who trained under Michael E. DeBakey MD at Baylor College of Medicine.

TecSalud TecSalud

== Research ==
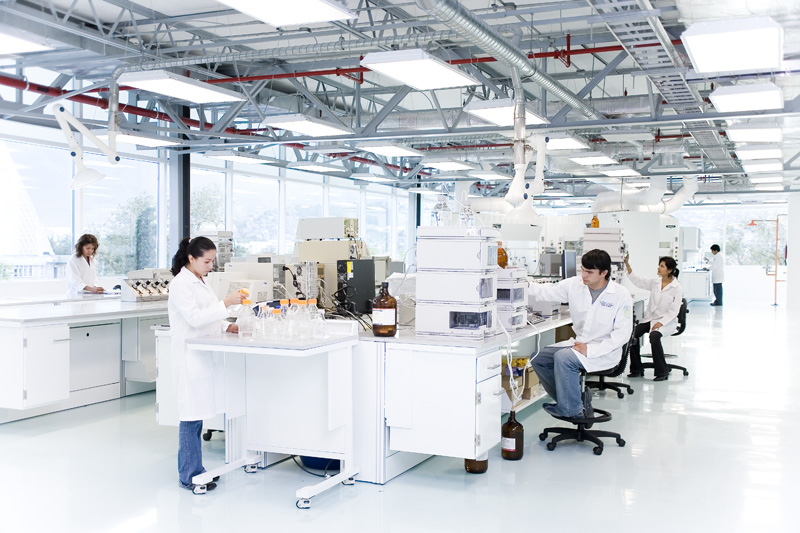
Biotechnology Center Research Laboratories

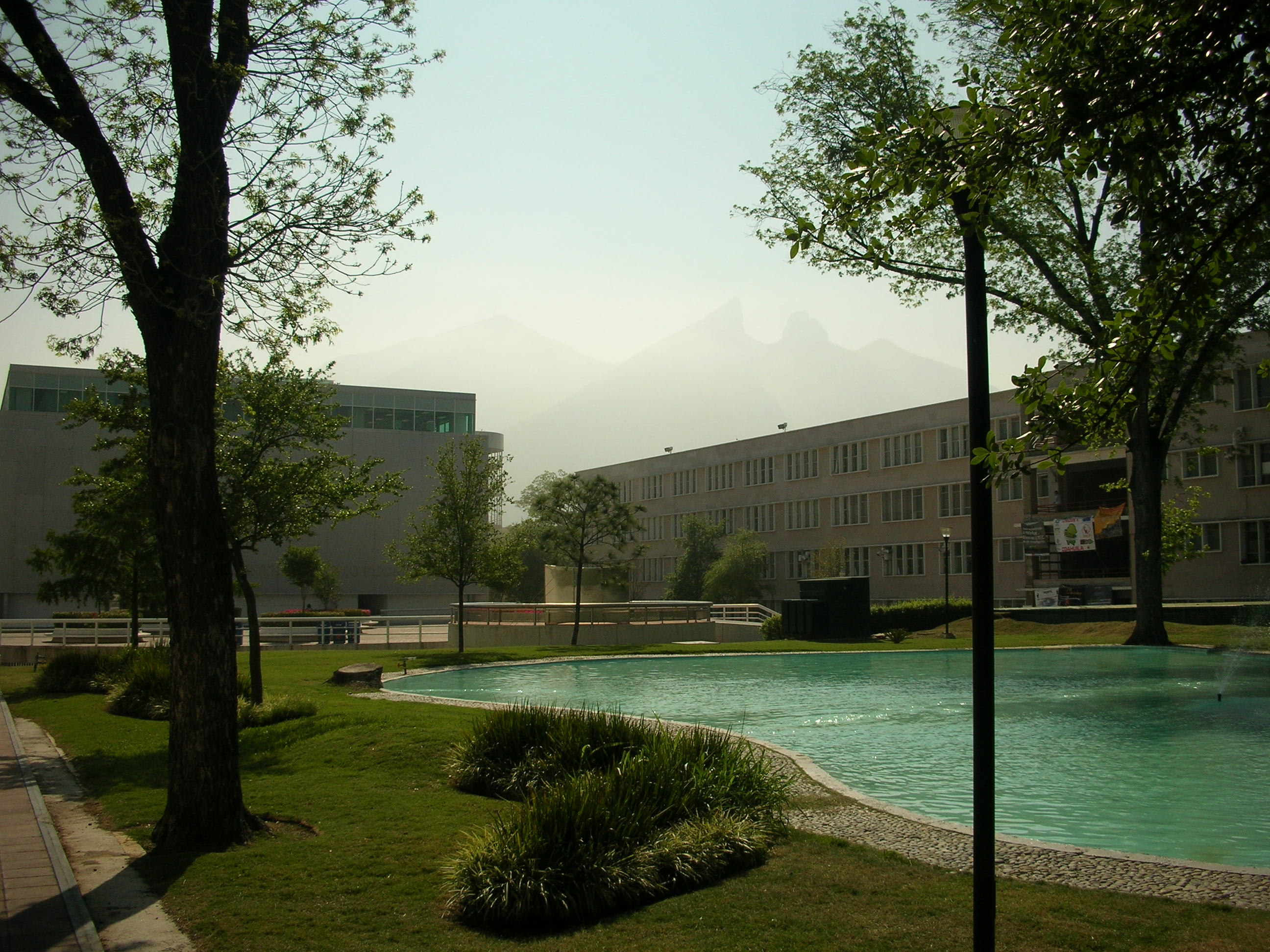
Its FEMSA Biotechnology Center (left) is the leading source of patent applications among its research centers In 2008 the institute was the leading patent applicant among Mexican universities and generated three times as many international patents as its closest competitors.

Although some of the founding members of its faculty were prominent researchers (first rector León Ávalos y Vez had formed a National Commission on Science and served as director-general of the School of Electrical and Mechanical Engineering of the National Polytechnic Institute) formal research activities at the institute did not start until 1951, when its Institute of Industrial Research was founded in close collaboration with the Southwest Research Institute of San Antonio, Texas —one of the oldest and largest independent, nonprofit, applied research and development organizations in the United States.

Notwithstanding some achievements, throughout most of the 20th century its research activities —normally financed independently or under private sponsorship— were rather scarce in comparison to public universities such as the National Autonomous University of Mexico or the National Polytechnic Institute, whose budgets make up to 30% of the federal spending in higher education and, as such, are heavily financed by the government through the federal budget.

Despite its inherent difficulties to secure research funds in a developing country where private sponsorship barely accounts for 1.1% of the national spending on science, a new institutional mission in 2005 made social and scientific research in Mexico's strategic areas one of its top priorities for the next decade. As a result, new corporate endowments and funds were committed, new research programs were created (including the first research program financed by Google in Latin America) and important labs and infrastructure have been built, such as the US$ 43 million Femsa Biotechnology Center, the Water Center for Latin America and the Caribbean (financed by the Inter-American Development Bank and the Femsa Foundation), the Motorola Research and Development Center on Home & Networks Mobility, its MXN $24 million Center for Advanced Design at the Guadalajara Campus and, in association with the Mainz Institute of Microtechnology of Germany (IMM), the first center of chemical micro process engineering in Latin America.

Additionally, the Institute developed a researcher-friendly patent scheme that aims to attract talented researchers and reduce the national brain drain. The scheme, in which the researcher may receive up to 30% of the patent licensing income, works in combination with its internal MXN$ 100,000 Rómulo Garza Prize and its national MXN$ 200,000 Luis Elizondo Prize and has allowed it to become the leading patent applicant among Mexican universities since 2006.

In 2025, the university integrated a Meltio M450 metal additive manufacturing system for student training and industrial research in directed energy deposition processes.

== Student life ==
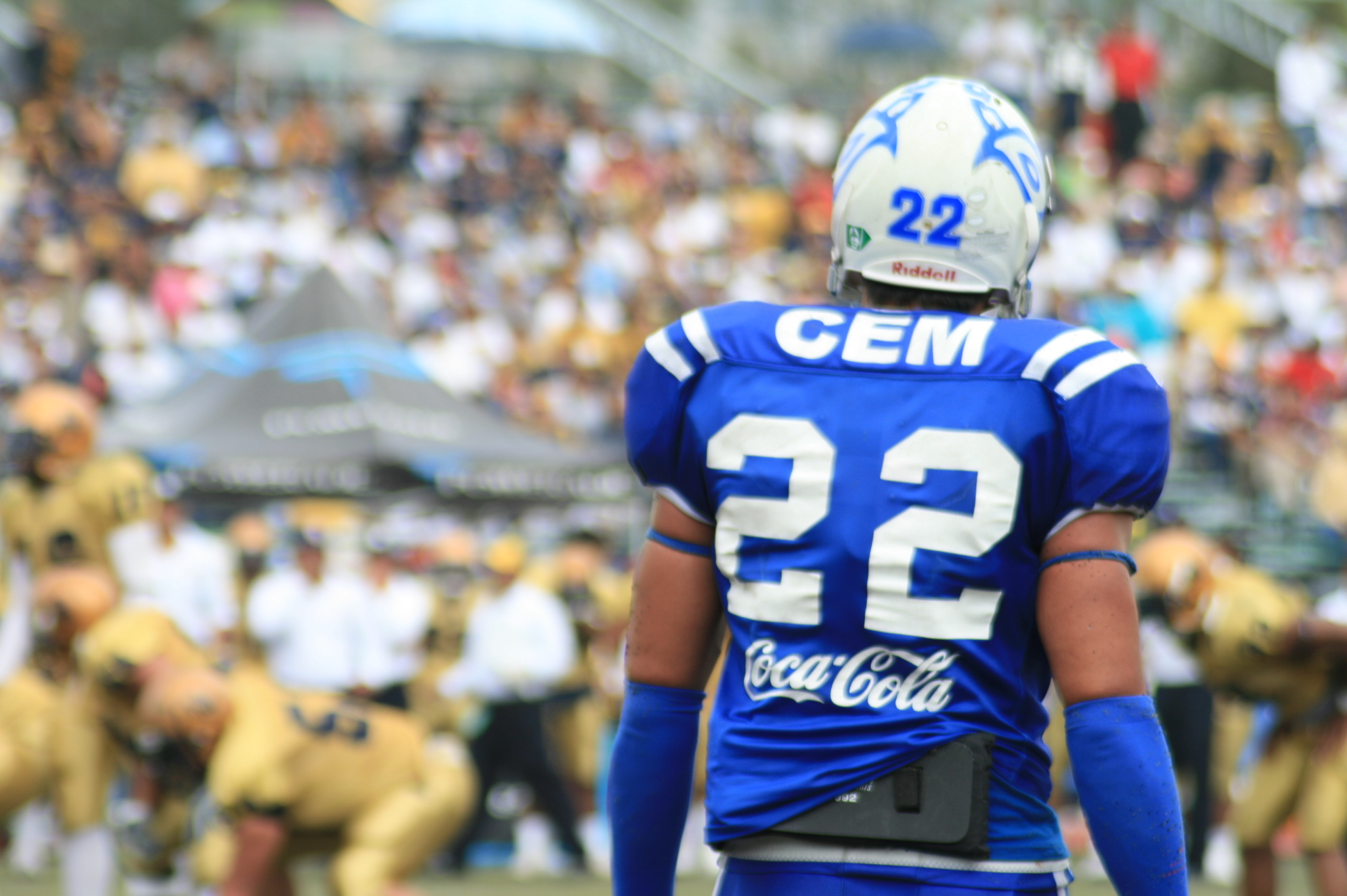
An American football player from the State of Mexico Campus overlooks the playing field. Teams from the Institute won every single American Football Collegiate Championship in Mexico from 1998 to 2008.

Student life, traditions and activities vary among campuses. Generally speaking, student involvement is encouraged by the local campus through an office of student affairs and the Department of Leadership and Student Formation (LiFE), which supervises most of the student groups, sports teams, regional associations and its student federation (FETEC).

The Institute goes to great lengths to provide scholarships to those in need, awarding partial financial assistance to 49% of its student population. However, with tuition fees exceeding MXN $200,000 per academic year (among the highest in Latin America according to Forbes magazine) most of its student community comes from upper and upper-middle class and the overall atmosphere is arguably politically and socially conservative. For example, opposite-sex visits are forbidden in dormitories unless it is in common areas and some high school staff in the Mexico City Campus has publicly admonished students for questioning conservative politicians during school visits (although no disciplinary action was ever taken).

The number of international students vary notably among campuses. As of December 2017, 4,714 foreign students were studying in one of its campuses while 10,618 Tech students were taking courses in a foreign university.

=== Athletics ===
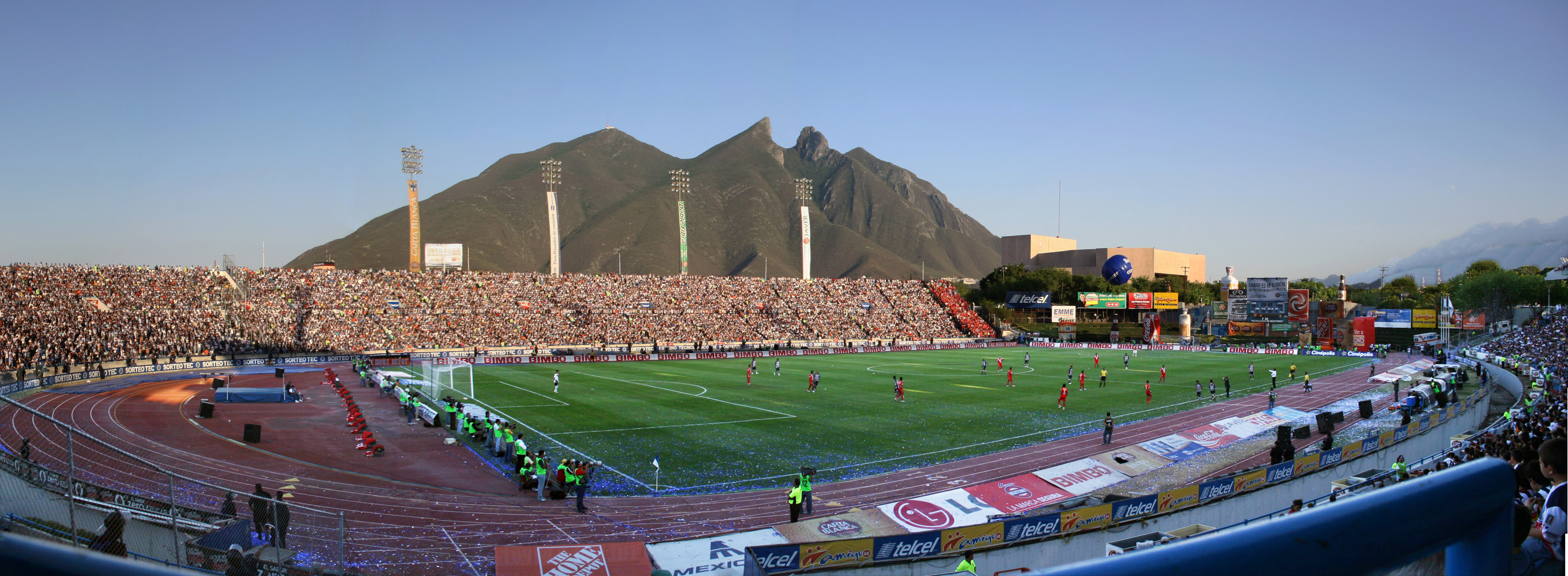
The Estadio Tecnológico, aside from hosting athletic and cultural events, hosts professional football matches since 1952 and served as an official venue for the 1983 FIFA World Youth Championship and the 1986 FIFA World Cup.

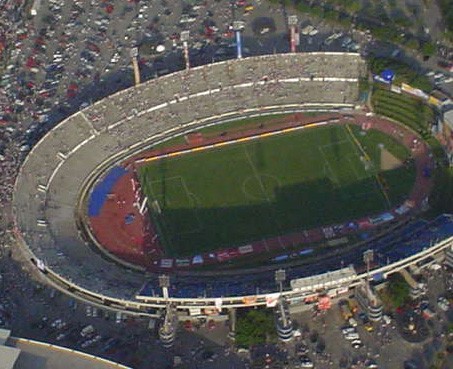
Aerial shot of the stadium of the Monterrey Rayados soccer team

Tec has a good record in college athletics, picking up over 18% of the medals at the 2007 national collegiate competition (Universiada) and one of its campuses won every American Football Collegiate Championship in Mexico (ONEFA) from 1998 to 2008. Such accomplishments were possible through the institute's investments in sports facilities and personnel and a well-funded and comprehensive athletic scholarships program, which attracted a significant number of promising athletes but prompted allegations of talent drain by some of its rivals. Before the 2009 season the Institute decided to part ways with the organization and create a new league; however, the league didn't materialize after other breakaway universities decided to remain in the ONEFA. The Institute asked to return to the organization, but the ONEFA Board decided that the request should be formally presented in its next ordinary meeting, after the 2009 season, which its four teams ended up playing between themselves in a Tech-only championship. For the 2010 season, the Institute decided not to participate in the ONEFA championship and, instead, asked the CONADEIP, a national athletic association of private educational institutions, to create an American football championship.

Although there are local adaptations, since 1945 the system-wide sports mascot is the ram (borrego salvaje), traditionally embodied in a male bighorn sheep. A somewhat popular urban legend states that the mascot was chosen by the American football team on its way to a match, after spotting a male sheep on the road. According to the official sources, however, the mascot was chosen during an official contest held by students in the mid-1940s.

== Notable people ==
From December 2006 to January 2009 both the U.S. Secretary of Commerce and the Mexican Secretary of Economy (former Kelloggs' CEO Carlos Gutiérrez and Gerardo Ruiz Mateos) were Tech alumni. Other businesspeople include Cemex' CEO Lorenzo Zambrano, FEMSA's CEO José Antonio Fernández, Grupo Salinas' CEO Ricardo Salinas Pliego, film producer and activist Max Appedole, and Casa Cuervo's CEO Juan Beckman.

In science and technology, Alexander Balankin, former lecturer at the Mexico City Campus, has received the 2005 UNESCO Science Prize for his works on Fractal Mechanics; Ernesto Enkerlin received UNESCO's 2005 Sultan Qaboos Prize for Environmental Preservation for his involvement in sustainability and two alumni have been members of the United States President's Information Technology Advisory Committee: Pedro Celis (Distinguished Engineer at Microsoft) and Héctor García Molina, former Director of Stanford University's Computer Science Department, 1999 ACM SIGMOD Innovations Award and highest h-index in Computer Science.

At least two late presidential candidates and democracy activists, Luis Donaldo Colosio and Manuel Clouthier, were former graduates. Over a dozen Mexican governors and cabinet members have attended classes at the institute, including former Secretary of Commerce and North American Free Trade Agreement (NAFTA) negotiator Herminio Blanco. In cultural affairs, Gabriel Zaid has distinguished himself as one of the leading Mexican intellectuals of the 20th century, and in sports, Fernando Platas and Víctor Estrada have both won Olympics medals, while former coach of Mexico's national football team, Miguel Mejía Barón, is in charge of the Football Department at Puebla.

As for staff and faculty, at least two rectors or directors of different universities have been lecturers or members of the staff at the institute. Luis Ernesto Derbez, a former Foreign Minister, is currently the Rector of the University of the Americas, Puebla. Enrique Cabrero Mendoza is the current head of The National Council for Science and Technology and a former rector of CIDE. In addition, the Ex-Rector Rafael Rangel Sostmann is member of the External Advisory Council of the World Bank Institute.

== See also ==
- List of Monterrey Institute of Technology and Higher Education faculty
- List of Monterrey Institute of Technology and Higher Education alumni
