= List of Monterrey Institute of Technology and Higher Education alumni =

The Monterrey Institute of Technology and Higher Education (in Spanish: Instituto Tecnológico y de Estudios Superiores de Monterrey, ITESM) commonly shortened as Monterrey Institute of Technology (Tecnológico de Monterrey) or Monterrey Tech (Tec de Monterrey) is one of the largest private, nonsectarian and coeducational multi-campus universities in Latin America with over 90,000 students at the high school, undergraduate, and postgraduate levels. Based in Monterrey, Mexico, the institute has 31 campuses in 25 cities throughout the country and is known for becoming the first university ever connected to the Internet in Latin America and the Spanish-speaking world, (Note: The first connection from Spain was completed in mid-1990 (see Sanz) while the Institute was connected in February 1989 (see Islas).) having one of the top graduate business schools in the region and being one of the leaders in patent applications among Mexican universities.

== Academics ==
- Horacio Ahuett Garza - specialist in rapid prototypes
- Adrianni Zanatta Alarcón - mechatronic engineer and researcher
- Mario Moises Alvarez - pharmaceutical biochemical engineer
- Rosaura Barahona - professor and writer
- Herminio Blanco Mendoza - economist
- Betsy Boze - college administrator
- René Cabral Torres - economist
- Jimena Canales - historian and researcher
- Mauricio De la Maza-Beningnos - conservationist, naturalist and zoologist
- Ernesto Enkerlin - environmentalist
- Héctor García-Molina - computer science professor and researcher
- José Luis González Velarde - mathematics professor and researcher
- Julio César Gutiérrez Vega - physicist
- Jorge Ibarra Salazar - economist
- Cristina Mittermeier - marine biologist, biochemical engineer
- Blanca Guadalupe López Morales - literature professor
- Arturo Molina Gutiérrez - Vice-president of Research, Postgraduate Studies and Continuing Education at the Tecnológico de Monterrey
- Daniel Moska Arreola - business professor
- Héctor Moreira Rodríguez - petrochemicals and strategy studies
- Gustavo Petricioli - economist, former Ambassador to the United States
- David Noel Ramírez Padilla - Rector of ITESM
- Rafael Rangel Sostmann - engineer; former rector of ITESM
- Marco Rito-Palomares - food and biochemical researcher
- Miguel Robles-Durán - urbanist
- Mireille Roccatti - researcher; first female president of Mexico's Human Rights Commission
- Manuel Sánchez - economist; former deputy governor of the Bank of Mexico
- Macario Schettino - economist
- Eduardo Sojo Garza-Aldape - economist; former advisor to President Vicente Fox
- Carlos Manuel Urzúa Macías - Director of EGAP
- Lorenzo Zambrano - CEO of CEMEX

== Business ==
- Alberto Bustani Adem - former president of ITESM-Monterrey
- Mauricio Fernández Garza - board member of Grupo Alfa
- José Antonio Fernández - CEO of FEMSA
- Eugenio Garza Lagüera - Chairman of the Board of ITESM and FEMSA
- Heriberto Félix Guerra - President of CANACINTRA
- Gustavo Guzmán - CEO of Azteca Telecom
- Javier de Lope Francés - founder of five companies before graduating college
- Ernesto Martens - former president of CINTRA; former Secretary of Energy in Mexico
- David Martínez Guzmán - founder and managing partner of Fintech Advisory
- Francisco Javier Mayorga Castañeda - businessman and former Secretary of Agriculture
- Pablo Reimers Morales - founder of Cesatoni and the ITESM Campus in Zacatecas
- Luis Armando Reynoso-Founder of Inmobiliario Reynoso Femat
- Alfonso Romo - agro-industrialist; founder of the Opción Ciudadana Party
- Carlos Salazar Lomelín - CEO of FEMSA
- Ricardo Salinas Pliego - CEO of Grupo Salinas and Grupo Elektra
- Hugo Salinas Price - founder of Grupo Elektra
- Blanca Treviño - founder of Softtek

== Politicians ==
- Lilia Aguilar Gil - federal deputy from Chihuahua
- Flor Ayala - Mexican congresswoman from Sonora
- Marco Antonio Adame - former governor of Morelos
- Agustín Basave Benítez - politician and president of PRD
- Roberto Borge Angulo - Governor of Quintana Roo
- Alberto Barrera Zurita - Representative to Chamber of Deputies
- Sue Ellen Bernal - Representative in the Chamber of Deputies for the State of Mexico
- Eduardo Bours - businessman and former governor of Sonora
- Fernando Canales Clariond - former governor of Nuevo León
- Javier Castelo Parada - representative from Sonora in the Chamber of Deputies
- Manuel Cavazos Lerma - Mexican Senator
- Arturo Chávez - attorney; former Attorney General of Mexico
- Benjamín Clariond - politician from Sonora
- Tatiana Clouthier - politician
- Manuel Clouthier - PAN nominee for president 1988
- Manuel Clouthier Carrillo - politician and representative from Sinaloa for the final four months of his term in the LXI Legislature
- Luis Donaldo Colosio - presidential candidate assassinated in 1994
- Gabino Cué Monteagudo - Governor of Oaxaca
- Alejandra del Moral Vela - Mexican congresswoman
- Ángel Alonso Díaz Caneja - Mexican senator from Puebla
- Fernando Elizondo Barragán
- Rodolfo Elizondo Torres - former mayor of Victoria de Durango
- Eugenio Elorduy Walther - former governor of Baja California
- Bernardo de la Garza - former presidential candidate of the Green Party in Mexico
- Alejandro Galván Garza - federal representative from Tamaulipas
- Lizbeth Gamboa Song - federal representative from Quintana Roo
- Carlos Joaquín González - Governor of Quintana Roo
- Juan Antonio Guajardo Anzaldúa - politician from Tamaulipas
- Marcela Guerra Castillo - Senator from Nuevo León
- Carlos Gutierrez - former US Secretary of Commerce
- Eugenio Hernández Flores - former governor of Tamaulipas
- César Jáuregui Robles - Senator from Coahuila
- Jorge Luis Lavalle Maury - Mexican senator from Campeche
- Ignacio Loyola Vera - Governor of Querétaro
- Daniel Ludlow Kuri - Federal Deputy from Hidalgo
- Gastón Luken Garza - Politician and businessman
- Antonio Juan Marcos Villarreal - politician and businessman
- Patricio Martínez García - former governor of Chihuahua
- Enrique Martínez y Martínez - former governor of Coahuila
- Carlos Medina Plascencia - former governor of Guanajuato
- Héctor Murguía Lardizábal - Politician, Senator from Chihuahua
- Maurilio Ochoa - Politician from Chihuahua
- Rafael Pacchiano Alamán - Federal deputy from Querétaro
- Enrique Peña Nieto - President of Mexico
- Juan Fernando Perdomo- Federal deputy from Veracruz
- Gerardo Priego Tapia - Politician and economist from Tabasco
- Luis Alberto Rico - Federal deputy from Coahuila
- Ernesto Ruffo Appel - former governor of Baja California, current Mexican Senador
- Gabriela Ruiz del Rincón-Senator from Sinaloa
- Gerardo Ruiz Mateos - former secretary of the economy of Mexico
- Antonio Sánchez Díaz de Rivera- Representative from Puebla
- Adolfo Toledo Infanzón - Senator from Oaxaca
- Zeferino Torreblanca - former governor of Guerrero
- Egidio Torre Cantú- Governor of Tamaulipas
- Antonio Valladolid Rodríguez - Federal deputy from Baja California
- Romeo Vásquez Velásquez - Politician and brigadier general in Honduras the military of Honduras from January 11, 2005
- Jorge Villalobos Seáñez - Federal deputy from Sinaloa
- Tomás Yarrington - former governor of Tamaulipas

== Sports ==
- Isaac Alarcón - professional American football player in the NFL
- Rolando Cantú - former professional American football player in the NFL and promoter of the sport in Mexico
- Eduardo Castañeda - former professional American football player in NFL Europe
- Cristina Ferral - professional football (soccer) player
- Diana Flores Arenas - Mexican National team flag football player
- Alfredo Gutiérrez - professional American football player in the NFL
- Ismael Hernández - pentathlete at 2016 Olympic Games
- Manuel Padilla - football player
- Fernando Platas - Olympic diver
- Ramiro Pruneda - former professional American football player in NFL Europe
- Guillermo Ruiz Burguete - college coach and former professional American football player in NFL Europe
- Sergio Schiaffino - former professional American football player in the CFL
- Pablo Solares - professional middle-distance runner

== Other professionals ==
- Araceli Ardón - Mexican writer
- Hans Backoff Escudero - oenologist; co-founder of Monte Xanic winery
- Rodolfo Barragán Schwarz - architect
- Carmen Victoria Félix Chaidez - scientist; aspiring astronaut to Mars
- Sigfrido Cuen - writer
- Álvaro Cueva - television critic
- Fernando del Rincón - Mexican television presenter
- Ricardo Elizondo Elizondo - writer and librarian
- José Horacio Gómez - Archbishop of Los Angeles
- Francisco González-Pulido - architect
- Alejandra Lagunes - press secretary to Mexican presidency
- Roberto Javier Mora García - journalist assassinated in 2004
- Luis Pazos - lawyer and author
- Ciro Procuna - Sports announcer
- Gladys Roldan-de-Moras - painter
- Daniel Alonso Rodriguez - Human rights speaker and politician
- Karen Villeda - Mexican writerCabe, Caroline (August 31, 2024). "Gladys Roldan-de-Moras illuminates her Mexican heritage and the vibrant history of charrería". Cowboys & Indians.
- Gabriel Zaid - writer
- Miguel Elizalde - Executive President of ANPACT
