= Arturo Molina =

Arturo Molina may refer to:

- Arturo Armando Molina (1928–2021), Salvadoran president
- Arturo Molina Sosa (born 1934), Mexican gynecologist
- Arturo Molina Gutiérrez (born 1964), Mexican professor and researcher
- Frost (rapper) (born 1964), born Arturo Molina Jr., American rapper
- Arturo Molina (footballer) (born 1996), Spanish footballer
