= Baho! =

2012 novel by Roland Rugero

- First edition cover
- Author: Roland Rugero
- Language: French
- Genre: Fiction
- Published: 2012
- Publisher: Vents d'ailleurs
- Pages: 128
- ISBN: 2-911-41299-0

Baho! is a novel by Roland Rugero published in France in 2012, and translated into English by Christopher Schaefer in 2015. It is the first Burundian novel to be translated into English. The story is set in the fictional village of Hariho, following a young mute boy named Nyamuragi. When his attempts to find a bathroom are misunderstood as sexual advances, Nyamuragi finds himself voiceless due both to his disability and the hasty persecution of his wrongful convictions.

Taking place after the events of the Burundian genocides, Baho! grapples with many sociocultural themes and arguments that deal with Burundi's recent problems with cultural identity. As a result, the novel employs many Burundian cultural elements including Kirundi proverbs. Despite its heavy involvement in Burundian culture and history, the novel does not discuss ethnical differences between characters. Baho! serves to instruct Burundi on how it can successfully grow as a culture and nation.

== Biographical background ==
Born in 1986 near Bujumbura, Burundi, Roland Rugero was largely impacted by the violence in Burundi throughout his early life. After fleeing the country with his family on two occasions, he managed to return as an adult to pursue an education and career in writing. Since then, he has worked as both a journalist and author. Throughout his career, he has dealt with political tensions both in Burundian media and the cultural identity problems suffered by his people. As a result, he frequently utilizes in his works a need to publicize Burundian culture and political progressivism.

== Summary ==
The story opens on the fictional Burundian village of Hariho, with the introduction of a nameless, one-eyed elderly woman. The region is experiencing a dry season, causing the plant life and the locals to struggle drastically. While the land was fruitful in the past, it is implied that the unfortunate state that it is currently in is the result of the selfishness of the Burundian people, specifically the “war of ‘93.”

As the one-eyed woman dwells upon her past, she hears a powerful scream in the distance, followed promptly by cries of rage directed at an unknown assailant. The assailant runs quickly by the woman, and it is learned that the man is the protagonist of this tale, local mute, Nyamuragi. The elderly widow joins in the chase after Nyamuragi as she struggles to comprehend the situation. As she approaches the group, she learns more details of the debacle.

General distrust among the locals has recently increased with a recent string of rape incidents, leading many young girls to have heightened paranoia. Nyamuragi, hoping to spend a peaceful evening at the stream, has been drinking an excess of water and wishes to relieve himself. Seeing Kigeme alone, he attempts to approach her and use hand gestures to inquire where the best place to relieve himself might be as not to offend the young girl. Misunderstanding his intentions, the young girl screams for her life, as she is sure that she about to meet the same fate as many girls her age have met in the past few months. Nyumaragi, fearful of this misunderstanding, attempts to silence Kigeme with his hands so he can buy just a moment to explain his situation. Unintentionally, he only succeeds in escalating her fear. As aggressive and afraid townsfolk begin to appear at the stream, the mute sees no other choice but to run, hoping to buy more time to explain, but he is not fast enough, and is caught quickly.

Nyamuragi, who was raised by an abusive father, developed a fear of speaking at a very young age, which gave off the appearance of muteness. This prompted his parents to endure a series of doctor visits to try and remedy their son's silence. After multiple doctors insist that there is nothing wrong with their son, one greedy and unfitting doctor proposes a “cure” that would involve a dangerous surgery to the young boy's tongue. The surgery, combined with a dangerous combination of oils administered by the doctor, resulted in actual muteness for a young Nyamuragi, leaving him unable to speak even if he so desired. Amidst the war within the country, Nyamuragi loses his parents to bandits raiding his home. After witnessing the horrific event, Nyamuragi decides that if the world he lives in his so cruel, he is glad that he is unable to speak in it. This thought echoes in his head as he wishes otherwise during his capture.

Just as the outraged community has gathered all the resources needed to hang the mute, the local police arrive on the scene to prevent the hanging from taking place. It is revealed that amongst the furious townsfolk was none other than Nyamuragi’s uncle, Jonathan, who has been siding with the crowd in order to buy their trust and prevent his nephew’s murder. The uncle, a veteran in the country’s war, witnessed a man burned alive after the man was not allowed to contest accusations of desertion. With this past experience weighing heavily upon him, he could not see another man killed before being able to defend himself, especially someone who could not speak.

The story closes as the one-eyed woman ponders the state of judgement, and whether or not it is fair, in the world that she lives in.

== Major themes ==
=== Time ===
The brevity of the novel and Nyamuragi's swift conviction are placed amongst many flashbacks and moral lessons taught by the one-eyed woman. This fluidity of time is rooted in the Kirundi customs regarding the interrelations between the present, past, and future. In this, it is believed that the present is inexplicably linked to both what happened before it, and the effects it will have.

=== Hunger ===
Hunger plays a pivotal role in the daily lives and actions of many of the main characters. For example, Nyamuragi scorns his untimely digestion, as it led him to require a bathroom and thus fall into the terrible misunderstanding thereafter.

In terms of the socioeconomic state of Burundi, hunger is used as sensory imagery to invoke the desperation of the poor villagers to survive. Working with the usage of time as a thematic device, Rugero strongly linked eating to the present, claiming that "hunger becomes a motor that pushes the characters of a novel to transcend time."

=== Nature ===
One of the primary conflicts presented in the novel is that between man and nature. Rugero incorporates Burundian lessons that associate children with nature, establishing a pure relationship that is tainted by the actions of man. In regards to the novel's historical context, this conflict is utilized to highlight the ruin brought to Burundian culture through its violent history.

The use of nature is largely used to define Nyamuragi's character. His age compared to his persecutors bring about a purer sense of innocence that is being threatened by the ruined adults. Nature is also used to define his disability, as both aspects of his being mute are brought about by very unnatural consequences. He is initially rendered speechless after the violence in Burundi results in his parents' murder, and he is physically muted by a botched treatment. In both cases, societal aspects of Burundi are held responsible for the abuse of one of nature's children.

=== Justice ===
The idea of justice in conflict is involved when Hariho suffers an increased number in local rape cases, to which the People's Court Responds with an unjust violence. Their disregard to hear Nyamuragi's testimony is magnified when his physical incapability to do so is considered. In addition to the unjust treatment of Nymauragi in terms of overlooking his disability, this trial also highlights the dangers of rape culture and a level one-sidedness that can effect such court cases.

== Allegory ==
The primary allegory that Rugero utilizes in Baho! ties Nyamuragi to the natural spirit of Burundi that is trying to live on despite the country's past. However, due to the violence instilled in the people, simple misunderstandings are brought to nearly kill the boy.

The many themes elicited in Baho! create a collection of conflicting elements that resemble the dualities that exist in current Burundian culture. As Rugero observes, Burundians are constantly striving to do better as a people, but are also quick to spite one another because of their differences. "Living in Burundi is to be constantly ready for a fight..." To Rugero, this in itself creates another duality in how the outside world views Burundi, as many observe Burundians to be entirely peace loving at face value.

This message is reinforced by the work's title, which translates as a command to "live", referring to Burundi's need to move past its violence and distrust and just live peacefully into the future.

== Language ==
Throughout the novel, many words and phrases are left in their original form in Kirundi. For example, each chapter begins with a traditional Birundian proverb, and the names and dialogue of the characters remain in Kirundi tradition.

In leaving words in Kirundi, Rugero puts more emphasis in their intention. The Kirundi is used to strongly connect the characters and their actions, as well as the chapter's beginning moral and the unfolding practice of it.

Such is the case in the names of the characters. Consequently, the characters' names are in traditional Kirundi, and their translations define the characters themselves. "Nyamuragi", for example, is used to define mutes by their disability.

== Style ==
The length of the novel utilizes its themes of time to create a fast-paced plot defined by its brevity. At the same time, the novel's style also creates a duality in time, as the primary plot occurs swiftly, yet its interpretation is largely slowed due to the changing narrators and telling of backstories. Rugero acknowledges the novel's pace by joking that if a film adaptation were to be made, it would only be around fifteen minutes in length.

In this, the plot takes on the structure of a traditional epic with the main protagonist being Nyamuragi. In being an epic, an aspect of parode is introduced, for Nyamuragi's call to adventure is the need to use the bathroom.

== Reception ==
The novel received critical success, enabling its subsequent translations and features in international literary festivals including the International Writing Program at the University of Iowa.

Among its reviews, Baho! was reported by Rwanda's The New Times as a "deeply contemplative" piece of African literature that contributes to an international movement of increased popularity among African cultural publications.

== Translations ==
English edition cover art, published in 2016 by Phoneme Media

Baho! was originally written in French with elements, including the title, written in Kurundi. Following its initial publication in French, the novel has undergone two major translations.

In 2013, Rugero and translator Giorgio Tognola published Baho! in Italian for the Swiss-Italian literature festival, Babel. Published by Edizion Socrates, the Italian translation is sold under the translated title, Vivi!

In 2015, Christopher Schaefer translated the novel into English. The project was directed by the non-profit publishing company Phoneme Media, which specializes in translating works with cross-cultural messages. Similarly, Schaefer undertook the translation in order to communicate aspects of Burundi culture to English speakers whose perceptions of Burundi would otherwise be influenced by Hollywood depictions of the similar crises suffered in Rwanda.
