= Pablo Morales (disambiguation) =

Pablo Morales (born 1964) is an American former competition swimmer.

Pablo Morales is also the name of:

- Pablo Morales Pérez (1905–1969), Venezuelan baseball executive and promoter
- Pablo Morales Rivera, Costa Rican politician
- Pablo Escudero Morales (born 1973), Mexican PVEM politician
- Pablo Reimers Morales, Mexican businessman

== See also ==
- Morales
