= Torres Médicas Angelópolis =

- Grupo Torres Médicas

Geography
- Location: Anillo Periférico Ecológico 3507, Tlaxcalancingo, Puebla, Puebla, Mexico
- Coordinates: 19°1′11.58″N 98°15′54.72″W

Organisation
- Care system: Private

History
- Founded: 2018

Links
- Website: www.torresmedicas.com/Angelopolis/
- Lists: Hospitals in Mexico

Torres Médicas Angelópolis is a private medical center which opened in 2018 on the southwest edge of the Puebla metropolitan area. It is located next to MAC Hospital which opened a short time earlier.

As of 2018, it was the largest medical construction project in the state of Puebla. According to director Javier de Lope Francés, the complex has 528 doctors’ offices, hospital facilities which total over 9000 m2 as well as a commercial area with fast food, banks, restaurants, a pharmacy, gymnasium and more.

The complex was inaugurated in February 2018, while parts were still under construction. That same month, there was a small fire started in a trash bin, but no injuries.
