= Maria van Daalen =

Dutch poet and writer

Maria van Daalen (born 8 July 1950) is a Dutch poet and writer. Maria van Daalen is a pseudonym of Maria Machelina de Rooij.

She was born in Voorburg and studied at the VU University Amsterdam and at the University of Iowa, where she also took part in the International Writing Program. She has taught at the Schrijversvakschool in Amsterdam.

She is also an expert on the subject of Vodou and, in 2007, was initiated as a Mambo Asogwe in Haiti. She was an advisor for an exhibit of Vodou art objects at the Royal Tropical Institute in Amsterdam.

Van Daalen published her first poetry collection Raveslag (The Beat of the Raven's Wing) in 1987; it was shortlisted for the C. Buddingh' Prize. Translations of her poems have appeared in various publications in English, Romanian, Finnish, German, Italian, French, Persian and Frisian.

== Selected works ==
- Het Hotel (The hotel), poetry (1994)
- Elektron, muon, tau (Electron, Muon, Tau), poetry (2000)
- De zwarte engel (The Black Angel), prose (2005)
- De wet van behoud van energie (The Law of Conservation of Energy), poetry (2007)
