= 2009 swine flu pandemic in North America =

The 2009 swine flu pandemic in North America, part of a pandemic in 2009 of a new strain of influenza A virus subtype H1N1 causing what has been commonly called swine flu, began in the United States or Mexico.

Community Outbreaks

== Countries and territories ==
=== North America ===
Outbreak evolution in North America:
Deaths
Confirmed cases
Unconfirmed or suspected cases

Outbreak evolution in North America:
2000+ cases
500+ cases
100+ cases
1+ cases

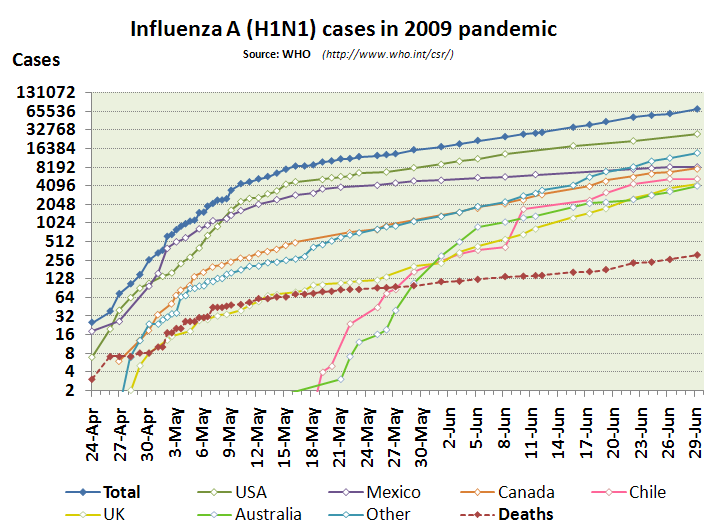
A semi-logarithmic chart of laboratory-confirmed A(H1N1) influenza cases by date according to WHO reports. Mexico, USA, and Canada are shown as a breakdown of the total.

==== Canada ====
Roughly 10% of Canadians had been infected with the virus as of mid-late November with 416 confirmed deaths as of January 7; there were over 10,000 confirmed cases when Health Canada stopped counting in July 2009. Canada began its vaccination campaign in October and 40% of the populace has since been immunized against H1N1.

The widespread effect of H1N1 in Canada was a serious concern for the XXI Olympic Winter Games, which took place in Vancouver in February 2010.

Outbreak evolution in Canada

0 deaths
1+ deaths
5+ deaths
20+ deaths
100+ deaths

Deaths
Confirmed cases

2000+ cases
500+ cases
100+ cases
1+ cases

==== Mexico ====
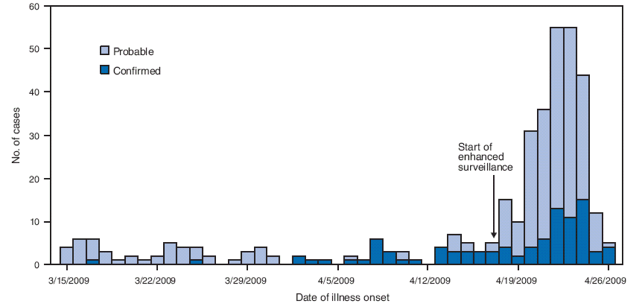
Probable and confirmed Mexican cases by date of illness onset, March 15 – April 26. —CDC

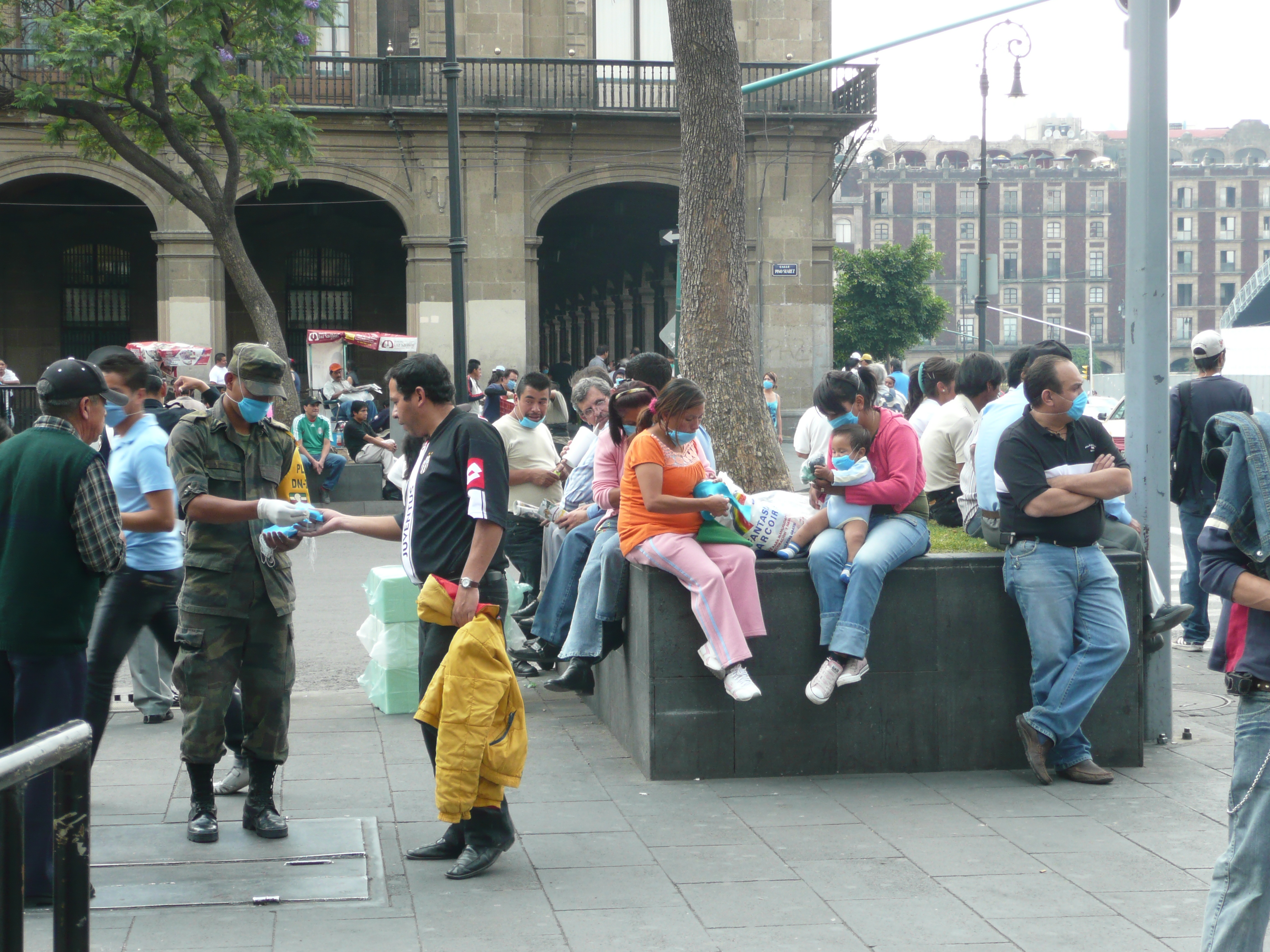
Mexican soldiers distributing protective masks to citizens

Outbreak evolution in Mexico: Deaths Confirmed cases

Outbreak evolution in Mexico: 2000+ cases 500+ cases 100+ cases 1+ cases

Outbreak evolution in Mexico: 1+ deaths 5+ deaths 20+ deaths 100+ deaths

Dr. José Ángel Córdova Villalobos, Mexico's Secretariat of Health, stated that since March 2009, there have been over 1,995 suspected cases and 149 deaths, with 20 confirmed to be linked to a new swine influenza strain of Influenza A virus subtype H1N1. As of April 26 there had been 1,614 cases, with 103 deaths and about 400 patients in hospital; approximately two-thirds of the sick patients had recovered. "'As many as 23,000 Mexicans were likely infected with the swine flu virus,' Neil Ferguson of Imperial College London and colleagues reported in the journal Science."

Soldiers mobilized by the government have handed out six million surgical masks to citizens in and around Mexico City. On April 24, 2009, schools (from pre-school to university level) as well as libraries, museums, concerts and any public gathering place, were shut down by the government in Mexico City and the neighboring State of Mexico to prevent the disease from spreading further; the schools in Mexico City, the State of Mexico, and the state of San Luis Potosí will remain closed until at least May 5. Marcelo Ebrard, Mexico City's mayor, has also asked all night-life operators to shut down their places of business for ten days to prevent further infections. José Ángel Córdova, federal Secretary of Health, said on April 24 that schools will probably be suspended for at least the following week then, and that it will take around ten days to see the evolution of the virus' behavior, and to consider other measures after such. On April 25, President Felipe Calderón declared an emergency which granted him the power to suspend public events and order quarantines. Hours later, Córdova announced that classes in Mexico City would be officially suspended through May 6. On April 26, Natividad González Parás, governor of the northeastern State of Nuevo León, announced that statewide schools will remain closed until 6 May, and established a quarantine system in airports, central bus stations and the creation of observation points mainly in the southern part of the state at the nearest highways to the borders with other states, in order to realize tests conducted on people arriving from other states. However, as for April 27, there are no confirmed reported cases of infection in this state.

On April 26, the World Bank announced US$ 25 million in immediate aid loans to Mexico, an additional US$180 million for long-term assistance to address the outbreak, and advice on how other nations have responded to similar crises.

On April 27, the Secretariat of Public Education announced that all schools in Mexico will remain closed at least until May 6.

On April 28, the Mexico City government closed all restaurants and cinemas. The National History and Anthropology Institute also closed all its archaeological sites and museums, including the most famous Mayan and Aztec ruins, until further notice.

==== United States ====
Confirmed USA cases with known dates of illness onset (April 27). —CDC

Outbreak evolution in the United States: 2000+ cases 500+ cases 100+ cases 1+ cases

Outbreak evolution in the United States: 1+ deaths 5+ deaths 20+ deaths 100+ deaths

Initial reports of atypical flu in two individuals in southern California led to the discovery of the novel swine flu virus by the CDC in mid-April. More than a hundred cases were confirmed in the next two weeks, spread through a dozen states. Outside of California and Texas, initial cases were all tied to recent travel to Mexico or close contact with those who had recently visited Mexico. St. Francis Preparatory School, a private school in New York, was the center of a large cluster of cases after a Spring Break trip by several students, and perforce one of the first U.S. schools to be closed as a public health measure during the early outbreak. Most of the cases in California and Texas are not linked and may reflect localized outbreaks of this virus in those areas. As of April 30, the disease was not as virulent outside of Mexico as within Mexico, for reasons not fully understood.

The United States of America declared a state of Public Health Emergency but this was said to be standard procedure in cases as divergent as the recent inauguration and flooding. According to The New York Times, "the emergency declaration frees resources to be used toward diagnosing or preventing additional cases and releases money for more antiviral drugs," including the transfer of approximately 12 million influenza medications from a federal stockpile to states. The U.S. plans followed a guidebook developed over the past five years to fight a pandemic flu such as H5N1. The situation developed rapidly with the White House initially looking into the matter on April 24 according to press releases, but rapidly adopting a serious stance as the WHO and CDC issued stronger recommendations.

On April 29, the US suffered its first confirmed death of swine flu. On April 28, the Centers for Disease Control and Prevention had officially confirmed through tests that a 23-month-old child was infected with the flu. When the sickness continued to worsen the next day, he was transferred to Texas Children's Hospital in Houston, where he died.

On May 5, Judy Trunnell, a woman in her 30s suffering from "chronic underlying health conditions" died of swine flu in Cameron County, near the US-Mexico border. She was the first US citizen to die from the disease. The woman, a special education teacher, had recently given birth to an eight-month-term healthy baby, delivered by caesarian section. She had been in a coma after being admitted to the hospital with breathing problems on April 19. The woman had also suffered from asthma, rheumatoid arthritis and a skin condition.

On May 10, a 30-year-old man with underlying health problems died in Washington from H1N1, the first fatality in that state.

On May 17, 55-year-old Mitchell Wiener, an assistant principal at Intermediate School 238 in Hollis, Queens died from H1N1, making it the first H1N1 related fatality in the state of New York. Wiener suffered from many other underlying health problems, weakening his resistance to the disease.

On May 19, 2009, a St. Louis County man became the first death in Missouri due to the Swine Flu.

As of mid-May 2009 many states had abandoned testing for likely influenza cases unless serious illness and/or hospitalization were present. Because reported numbers represent only confirmed cases, they are a "very great understatement" of the total number of cases of infection, according to the CDC.

The real number of swine flu cases in the United States could be “upwards of 100,000,” a top public health official estimated on Friday — far higher than the official count of 7,415 cases confirmed by laboratories.

On September 1, 2009, several new virus isolates were tested for neuraminidase inhibitor resistance. These included one seasonal influenza A (H1N1), 13 influenza A (H3N2), 23 Influenza B, and 1, 855 2009 influenza A (H1n1) virus isolates.

=== Central America and Caribbean ===
H1N1 in Central America and Caribbean
Deaths
Confirmed cases

H1N1 in Caribbean and Central America
500+ cases
50+ cases
5+ cases

==== Aruba ====
Trevor van Gellecum, the Director of the Aruban Department of Health, announced that all passengers arriving by airplane or cruise ship will have to fill out a health questionnaire beginning on April 27, 2009. Hotels and resorts are required to report to authorities if any tourists are showing flu-like symptoms. The government of Aruba also ordered antiviral medication and other supplies from the Netherlands and the United States. No swine flu cases have been reported.

==== The Bahamas ====
Ten students and teachers who arrived from Mexico in the last week of April are in quarantine.

==== Barbados ====
The Minister Of Health, Donville Inniss has confirmed that two samples have been sent off to the Caribbean Epidemiology Centre (CAREC) in Trinidad and Tobago to be tested for the virus.

==== Belize ====
There are two suspected cases of swine flu currently under investigation in Belize. As a result, all major public events have been cancelled. This includes the National Agriculture and Trade Show. People have been asked to be very careful and use preventative measures.

==== Costa Rica ====
Costa Rica Confirmed cases followed by death Confirmed cases Unconfirmed or suspected cases

A 21-year-old woman was confirmed as carrying the swine flu virus on April 28. The woman came back from Mexico by airplane. A second case was confirmed on the same day, a 30-year-old man who traveled to Mexico the week before. On May 2 the Costa Rican Ministry of Health confirmed two more cases. Four more cases were confirmed on May 4.

A 53-year-old man became the first confirmed death from the disease in the country, as reported by the Minister of Health on May 9. This was the first death outside of a North American country and the fourth country in the world to present a mortal case. The deceased man was suffering other chronic diseases. The Minister of Health informed he had diabetes and also was suffering from chronic obstructive pulmonary disease (COPD). She also informed the man was infected inside Costa Rica because he had not traveled to Mexico.

On August 11 was confirmed that Costa Rica's president, Óscar Arias Sánchez, was infected with the A(H1N1) virus, becoming the first head of state sick with the A(H1N1) virus President Arias returned to his normal activities after one week of isolation at his home.

As of September 8 the Costa Rican Ministry of Health had 1,246 confirmed cases, 1,257 pending cases, 6,337 already discarded, and 33 deaths. The mortality rate is 0.73 deaths by 100,000 people, and the fatality rate is 2.96%. From all deceased patients, 48.5% occurred among San José residents, and only the Guanacaste Province has not had any deaths related to the virus. The age of the deceased varies between 20 and 79 years, with an average age of 41 years.

==== Cuba ====
Cuba Confirmed cases Unconfirmed or suspected cases

Cuba's Health Ministry is adopting precautionary measures to prevent the illness from coming into the country. The government has advised citizens to go to seek medical treatment if experiencing flu-like symptoms. Cuba has also banned flights to and from Mexico for 48 hours.

Cuba has reported its first case of Influenza A H1N1 as a Mexican student who travelled to Cuba on April 25 for study.

The ministry statement said that in all of Cuba, authorities have tested 84 possible cases in people of eight nationalities for the virus. Only one case was positive - the Mexican student.

==== Dominican Republic ====
Outbreak evolution in the Dominican Republic

According to the Dominican Republic Government, two people were confirmed to be infected with the AH1N1 flu on May 27. One was a 58-year-old woman from Santiago de los Caballeros and the other was a 20-year-old woman from Santo Domingo Province. Each of them had visited the United States (Orlando and Seattle, respectively) before being diagnosed. On May 30, nine more cases were confirmed, all from the Carol Morgan school.

On June 5, a 17-year-old pregnant girl infected with the AH1N1 virus died. 44 cases were confirmed to this date.

==== Guatemala ====
Guatemala

A 29-year-old, who had recently visited Mexico, was being tested for a suspected case of swine flu.

Guatemala is checking all travelers arriving from Mexico for signs of flu and stopping anyone with symptoms of the virus at border crossings.

On May 5, in a meeting with Health Minister and the Vicepresident, it was announced that an 11-year-old girl was infected with the AH1N1 virus. It was told that the family of the girl came from Mexico a few days ago, but no one else in the family it is infected.

On the same press meeting, Rafael Espada said: "We've to prepare ourselves for the worst, and just hope for the best".

The government has stated that they're prepared for a first wave of AH1N1. Nevertheless, other institutions have started to help population by giving them masks and information about the virus. University of San Carlos de Guatemala by the Faculty of Pharmacy and Pharmaceutics has started to prevent the virus among the students population, as the Rector Estuardo Gálvez said: "This people are prepared to counteratack the virus inside and outside this campus".

==== Honduras ====
Outbreak evolution in Honduras

Honduras reported its first confirmed case of swine flu(H1N1) on 27 May 2009. On 22 June it reported its first death of swine flu.

==== Jamaica ====
As of 7 July 2009, there has been 33 confirmed cases of swine flu in Jamaica. On the 6th of July, Jamaica recorded its first human mortality from the virus. Health Minister Ruddy Spencer told Parliament that the country has been placed on high alert. There has been heightened surveillance at health care facilities and port entry's.

==== Panama ====
H1N1 in Panama

As of July 23, 553 confirmed cases had been reported by Panamanian health authorities:

66% of the cases are teens (12–15) and the 34% are adults(20-49). Only one death has been reported. Schools with positive cases are being disinfected and thermographic cameras have been deployed at Tocumen International Airport to identify sickness in arriving passengers.

==== Trinidad and Tobago ====
The members of the Under 17 Trinidad and Tobago football team have taken Flu tests after returning from a World Cup qualifying football match in Mexico City. One female was confirmed as having contracted the H1N1 influenza. Her identity is being withheld. At the moment, people who travelled on the same aircraft as the infected woman are being asked to contact the relevant health authorities.

== Timeline ==
2009	A(H1N1) Outbreak and Pandemic Milestones in North America
17 March	(Mexico) First case in the world of what would later be identified as swine flu.
28 March	(United States) First case in the US of what would later be identified as swine flu.
12 April	(Mexico) First known death due to what would later be identified as swine flu.
25 April	Community outbreaks confirmed in United States.
25 April	Community outbreaks confirmed in Mexico.
27 April	First case confirmed in Canada.
29 April	First death confirmed in the United States.
2 May	First case confirmed in Costa Rica.
3 May	(Canada) First cases confirmed of infections in pigs, also first cases of reverse zoonosis.
4 May	First case confirmed in El Salvador.
5 May	First case confirmed in Guatemala.
7 May	First death confirmed in Canada.
7 May	First case of zoonosis in Canada, where an infected pig infects a human.
8 May	First case confirmed in Panama.
8 May	Community outbreaks confirmed in Canada.
9 May	First death confirmed in Costa Rica.
12 May	First case confirmed in Cuba.
13 May	Community outbreaks confirmed in Costa Rica.
22 May	First case confirmed in Honduras.
26 May	First case confirmed in Puerto Rico.
27 May	First case confirmed in Dominican Republic.
31 May	(The Bahamas) First case confirmed in Bahamas.
2 June	First case confirmed in Nicaragua.
2 June	First case confirmed in Bermuda.
3 June	First case confirmed in Barbados.
3 June	First case confirmed in Jamaica.
4 June	First case confirmed in Trinidad and Tobago.
5 June	First death confirmed in Dominican Republic.
5 June	First case confirmed in Cayman Islands.
7 June	First case confirmed in Martinique.
8 June	First case confirmed in Dominica.
10 June	First death confirmed in Guatemala.
10 June	Community outbreaks confirmed in Guatemala.
11 June	First case confirmed in British Virgin Islands.
17 June	(United States Virgin Islands) First case confirmed in U.S. Virgin Islands.
17 June	First case confirmed in Netherlands Antilles.
19 June	First case confirmed in Antigua and Barbuda.
22 June	First death confirmed in Honduras.
30 June	First case confirmed in Saint Lucia.
2 July	First case confirmed in Saint Vincent and the Grenadines.
3 July	First case confirmed in Aruba.
3 July	First death confirmed in El Salvador.
6 July	First case confirmed in Guadeloupe.
6 July	(Collectivity of Saint Martin) First case confirmed in Saint Martin.
6 July	First death confirmed in Jamaica.
7 July	First death confirmed in Puerto Rico.
7 July	First case confirmed in Belize.
9 July	Community outbreaks confirmed in Panama.
14 July	First case confirmed in Haiti.
14 July	First case confirmed in Saint Kitts and Nevis.
19 July	First death confirmed in Panama.
22 July	First case of Oseltamivir (Tamiflu) resistance found in Canada.
23 July	First case confirmed in Turks and Caicos Islands.
24 July	First case confirmed in Grenada.
24 July	First death confirmed in Cayman Islands.
25 July	Community outbreaks confirmed in El Salvador.
25 July	Community outbreaks confirmed in Nicaragua.
26 July	Community outbreaks confirmed in Cuba.
26 July	Community outbreaks confirmed in Honduras.
27 July	First death confirmed in Saint Kitts and Nevis.
5 August	First case confirmed in Anguilla.
12 August	First death confirmed in Nicaragua.
14 August	First case of Oseltamivir (Tamiflu) resistance found in United States.
3 September	(United States Virgin Islands) First death confirmed in U.S. Virgin Islands.
18 September	First death confirmed in Martinique.
19 September	(The Bahamas) First death confirmed in Bahamas.
30 September	First death confirmed in Barbados.
1 October	First case confirmed in Saint Barthélemy.
10 October	First death confirmed in Cuba.
14 October	(Trinidad and Tobago) First death confirmed in Trinidad & Tobago.
22 October	First death confirmed in Guadeloupe.
11 November	First case confirmed in Greenland.
24 November	(United States) First country to have double case, following by South Korea.
