= Totilawati Tjitrawasita =

Indonesian journalist and writer

Totilawati Tjitrawasita (born Maria Asumta Totilawati Tjitrawasita 1945 – 1982) was an Indonesian journalist and writer. Her pen name was Mbak Minuk.

She was born in Kediri, East Java, June 1, 1945. She was assistant editor for the Japanese language magazine Jaya Baya. In 1970, she won the Zakse award for young journalists. Many of her stories were first published in Japanese. In 1977, she published a collection of short stories Sekolah Rakyat (School Crush); it received first prize for fiction from the Book of the Year Foundation. In 1979, she became an honorary citizen of Surabaya for her contributions to the arts, including membership on the city's arts council. In 1980, she took part in the International Writing Program at the University of Iowa.
