= International Writing Program =

Writing residency for international artists in Iowa City, Iowa

The International Writing Program (IWP) is a writing residency for international artists in Iowa City, Iowa, United States. Since 2014, the program offers online courses to many writers and poets around the world. Since its inception in 1967, the IWP has hosted over 1,500 emerging and established poets, novelists, dramatists, essayists, and journalists from more than 150 countries. Its primary goal is to introduce talented writers to the writing community at the University of Iowa, and to provide for the writers a period of optimal conditions for their creative work. Since 2000, the IWP has been directed by poet and journalist Christopher Merrill.

== History ==
The IWP was founded by Paul Engle and Hualing Nieh Engle as a non-academic, internationally focused counterpart to the Iowa Writers' Workshop.

Under the Engles' guidance, hundreds of writers came to Iowa, particularly from parts of the world where literary and personal freedom was often restricted. During the 1970s and 1980s the program's reach towards nations in Africa, Asia, Latin America, and eastern Europe expanded significantly. In 1979 the Engles coordinated a "Chinese Weekend", one of the first significant meetings of writers from mainland China, Taiwan, Hong Kong, and the Chinese diaspora since 1949.

For their efforts to connect writers worldwide and to promote international understanding, the Engles were nominated for the Nobel Peace Prize in 1976.

Hualing Nieh Engle and Paul Engle co-directed the IWP until 1977, after which Engle retired and Hualing continued as sole director. She retired in 1988, and currently serves as a member of the IWP Advisory Board.

Other past directors include Fredrick Woodard (1988), Clark Blaise (1990), Steven Ungar (1998), and Sandra Barkan (1999).

== Current activities ==
The primary residency, which takes place each fall, offers writers the opportunity to participate in American literary, academic, and cultural life through talks, lectures, readings, screenings, stage performances, school visits, and travel, while providing time for personal writing and creative work. University of Iowa students can take several classes built around the work and presence of the IWP residents.

Literary translation is an integral part of the program's mission. At the time of Hualing's retirement, two volumes of selected IWP writings had been compiled under the title Writing From The World, in addition to another collection, The World Comes To Iowa, and more than a dozen individual volumes in the Iowa Translation Series. Today, the IWP supports 91st Meridian, an online literary journal, and the book series 91stM Books, housed at the independent Autumn Hill Books.

In recent years the program has broadened its efforts to promote international connections among writers by organizing a variety of events, some of which take place outside the United States. Among these are:

- Reading tours of American authors in the Middle East and other regions.
- International colloquia on current cultural topics
- Life of Discovery, a multi-year artist exchange program with members of Chinese minority groups
- Between the Lines, a program bringing high school students from Arabic-speaking countries and Russia to Iowa to practice creative writing alongside American students

=== Funding ===
A major source of funding for writers attending the IWP is the U.S. Department of State, and the program's administration is supported by the University of Iowa. The IWP also administers grants for writers sponsored for their residency by private and public cultural organizations in the United States and abroad.

== The IWP in literature and film ==
The IWP itself has been featured in a number of literary works, including:

- Memories of Light and Shade—Part 1, a serial novel by Sunil Gangopadhyay, published in the Bengali journal Urhalpool
- The Fall of the Japanese Language in the Age of English, a work of criticism by Minae Mizumura
- "Writing in the Mirror of the River", a short story by Mohamed Magani, published in 91st Meridian

In 1973, the United States Information Agency funded a documentary about the IWP, Community of the Imagination.

== Alumni ==
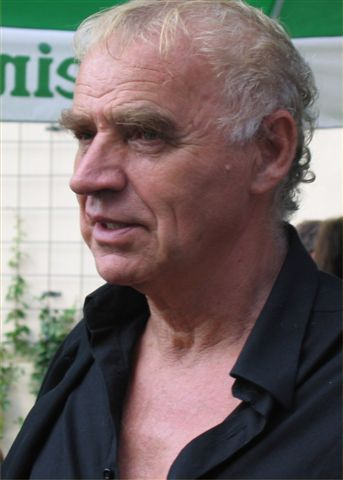
Janusz Glowacki

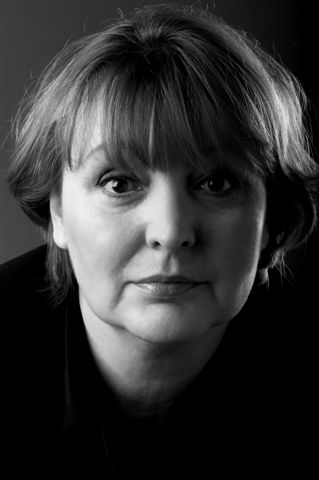
Dubravka Ugrešić

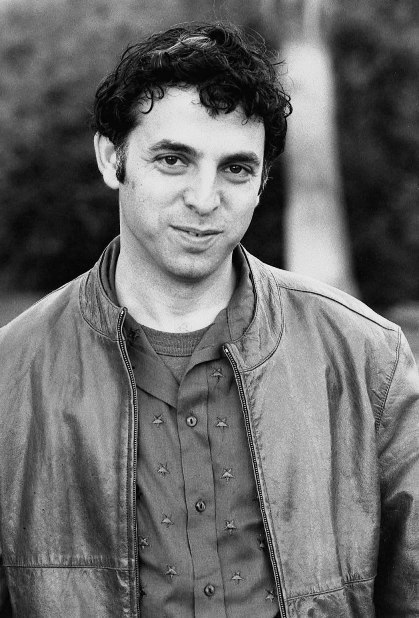
Etgar Keret

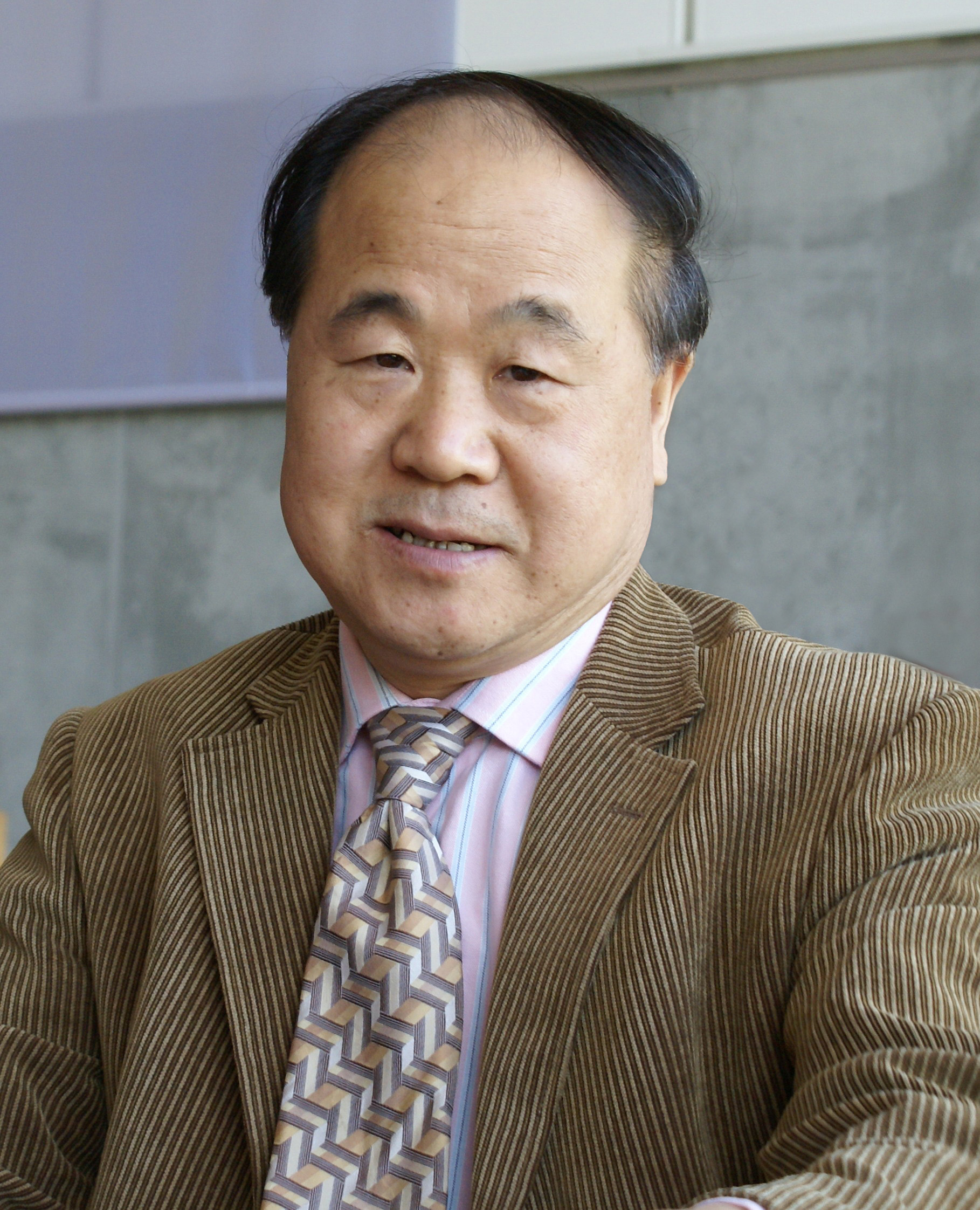
Mo Yan

Among the program's alumni are:

- Rumena Bužarovska (Macedonia, 2018)
- Homeira Qaderi (Afghanistan, 2015)
- Karen Villeda (Mexico, 2015)
- El Jones (Canada, 2015)
- Abhay K (India, 2015)
- Oscar Ranzo (Uganda, 2013)
- Ali Al Saeed (Bahrain, 2013)
- Karim Alrawi (Canada/ UK/ Egypt, 2013)
- Martin Dyar (Ireland, 2013)
- Teemu Manninen (Finland, 2013)
- Dmitri Golynko (Russia, 2013)
- Whiti Hereaka (New Zealand, 2013)
- Lee Chi-leung (Hong Kong, 2013)
- Sridala Swami (India, 2013)
- Rochelle Potkar (India, 2015)
- Roland Rugero (Burundi, 2013)
- Yui Tanizaki (Japan, 2013)
- Dimitris Lyacos (Greece/Italy, 2012)
- Taleb al Refai (Kuwait, 2012)
- Jana Beňová (Slovakia, 2012)
- María Sonia Cristoff (Argentina, 2011)
- Dorothy Tse (Hong Kong, 2011)
- Ghada Abdel Aal (Egypt, 2010)
- Ian Rosales Casocot (Philippines, 2010)
- Hon Lai-chu (Hong Kong, 2010)
- Dung Kai-cheung (Hong Kong, 2009)
- Tahereh Saffarzadeh (Iran, 1967)
- Daniachew Worku (1967)
- Devanur Mahadeva (India)
- Maria van Daalen (Netherlands, 1995)
- José Donoso (Chile, 1968, 1991)
- Luisa Valenzuela (Argentina, 1969)
- Janusz Głowacki (Poland, 1970, 1986)
- Arnošt Lustig (Czech Republic, 1970)
- Lin Hwai-min (Taiwan, 1970)
- Luisa Futoransky (Argentina, 1970)
- Marin Sorescu (Romania, 1971)
- João Ubaldo Ribeiro (Brazil, 1972)
- András Petőcz (Hungary, 1998)
- Ágnes Gergely (Hungary, 1973)
- Ashokamitran (India, 1973)
- Virginia R. Moreno (Philippines, 1973)
- Peter Nazareth (Uganda, 1973)
- Bessie Head (Botswana, 1977)
- Edwin Thumboo (Singapore, 1977, 1986)
- Eavan Boland (Ireland, 1979)
- Totilawati Tjitrawasita (Indonesia, 1980)
- John Banville (Ireland, 1980)
- Emmanuel Hocquard (France, 1980)
- Earl Lovelace (Trinidad, 1980)
- Wang Meng (China, 1980)
- Anton Shammas (Israel, 1981)
- Ding Ling (China, 1981)
- Kenji Nakagami (Japan, 1982)
- Liu Binyan (China, 1982)
- Sunil Gangopadhyay (India, 1982)
- Dubravka Ugrešić (Yugoslavia, 1983)
- Lorna Goodison (Jamaica, 1983)
- Sebastian Barry (Ireland, 1984)
- Takashi Hiraide (Japan, 1985)
- Orhan Pamuk (Turkey, 1985)
- David Albahari (Yugoslavia, 1986)
- Edvard Radzinsky (Russia, 1987)
- Li Ang (Taiwan, 1987)
- Bei Dao (China, 1988)
- Slavenka Drakulić (Yugoslavia, 1988)
- Etienne van Heerden (South Africa, 1990)
- Mircea Cărtărescu (Romania, 1990)
- Gabriela Adameșteanu (Romania, 1990)
- Can Xue (China, 1992)
- András Nagy (Hungary, 1993)
- Sue Woolfe (Australia, 1994)
- Ranjit Hoskote (India, 1995)
- Victor Pelevin (Russia, 1996)
- Rodrigo Fresán (Argentina, 1996)
- Tibor Fischer (UK, 1997)
- Nu Nu Yi (Burma, 2000)
- Martín Rejtman (Argentina, 2000)
- Han Kang (Korea, 1998)
- Hwang Ji-woo (Korea, 2000)
- Thu Maung (Burma, 2001)
- Khin Lay Nyo (Burma, 2001)
- Etgar Keret (Israel, 2001)
- Joy Goswami (India, 2001)
- Su Tong (China, 2001)
- Xi Chuan (China, 2002)
- Edward Carey (UK, 2002)
- Yu Hua (China, 2003)
- Minae Mizumura (Japan, 2003)
- Gábor T. Szántó (Hungary, 2003)
- Mo Yan (China, 2004)
- Doris Kareva (Estonia, 2006)
- Kiran Nagarkar (India, 2007)
- Meena Kandasamy (India)
- Chen Yingzhen (Taiwan, 1983)
- Ru Zhijuan (China, 1983)
- Wang Anyi (China, 1983)
- Wu Zuguang (China, 1983)
- Kemala (Malaysia, 1993)
- Zakaria Ariffin (Malaysia, 1997)

Many alumni presentations, including audio and video, have been archived.
