= National Association of Bus, Truck and Tractor Producers =

Mexican trade association

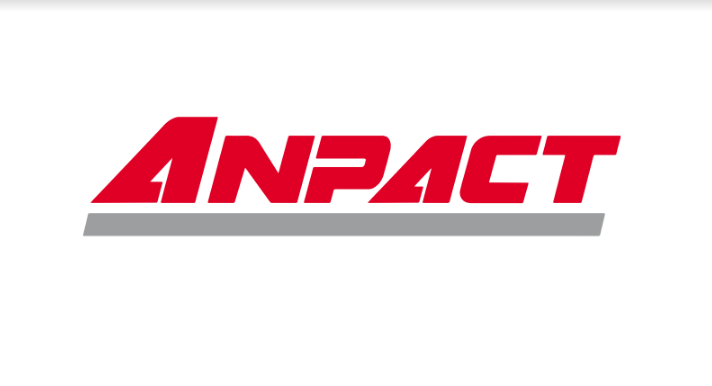
- Native name: Asociación Nacional de Productores de Autobuses, Camiones y Tractocamiones
- Type: Automotive industry
- Industry: Automotive industry
- Founded: December 8, 1992; 33 years ago
- Products: Trucks
- Brands: Cummins, Detroit Diesel Allison de México, S. de R.L. de C.V., DINA S.A., Freightliner, Hino Motors, International Navistar de México, Isuzu, Kenworth, Mack Trucks, MAN, Mercedes-Benz Autobuses, Scania, Volkswagen de México, Volvo Buses

The National Association of Bus, Truck and Tractor-Trailer Producers is a non-profit Mexican institution that brings together and represents companies that produce heavy duty vehicles with a gross vehicle weight equal to or greater than 3.8 tons and its engines. It was founded on December 8, 1992. Currently, its Executive President is Miguel Elizalde Lizarraga.

== History ==
After a few months of work, on December 8, 1992, the company was legally constituted, with Jaime Serra Puche, then Secretary of Commerce and Industrial Development, as an honorary witness, and who was later renamed as Ministry of the Economy.

The associated companies are: Cummins, Detroit Diesel Allison de México, S. de R.L. de C.V., Dina, Freightliner-Daimler, Hino Motors, International Navistar de México, Isuzu, Kenworth, Mack Trucks, MAN, Mercedes-Benz Autobuses, Scania, Volkswagen de México, Volvo Buses.

== Organization ==
There is a General Assembly, made up of the associates, which is the supreme authority of the association and meets annually during the first quarter of each year.

Additionally, it has a board of directors, in charge of the administration and which is made up of the CEOs of the associated companies, each of them will appoint a substitute board member so that each company has 2 members within the board of directors.

The Executive President of the association may not perform it any associate, his powers will be as general administrator and official representative before people, authorities and all kinds of institutions, additionally he will be the official spokesperson of the organization.

== Executive presidents ==
- César Flores Esquivel (1992–1999)
- René Espinosa y Torres Estrada (1999–2001)
- Juan José Guerra Abud (2001–2009)
- Carlos García Fernández (2009–2011)
- Miguel Elizalde Lizarraga (2012-to date)
