= Mario Moisés Álvarez =

Mexican researcher, born in Cd

- Born: Ciudad Juárez, Mexico
- Education: Monterrey Institute of Technology and Higher Education
- Occupation: Researcher

Mario Moisés Álvarez is a Mexican researcher. He was a visiting professor at the Harvard-MIT Division of Health Sciences and Technologies, at the Brigham Women's Hospital of the Harvard Medical School, in Cambridge Massachusetts (2014-2017). He also collaborated as a visiting professor in the Microsystems Technology Laboratories at MIT (2015-2016). Álvarez conducted research at the BIRC (Biomaterials Innovation Research Center) in the areas of Tissue Engineering, Biomaterials, and Microfluidics. Today, Mario Moisés Álvarez is a full professor at the Monterrey Institute of Technology and Higher Studies (Tecnológico de Monterrey), specializing in biomedical and biopharmaceutical engineering. His work has been recognized by Level III membership in Mexico's Sistema Nacional de Investigadores, a permanent membership in the AMC (Mexican Academy of Sciences), two granted US patents and twelve granted Mexican patents. He received the Rómulo Garza Insignia Award in 2017, the most prestigious research award from his institution, Tecnológico de Monterrey.

Álvarez's mother is a primary school teacher who insisted that her son attended the Tecnológico de Monterrey starting with high school, which he did at the Ciudad Juárez campus. This was followed by undergraduate study in biochemical engineering at the Guaymas campus and a masters in the same field at the Monterrey campus . He continued his education studying a masters and doctorate in chemical and biochemical engineering at Rutgers University in the research group of Professor Fernando Muzzio, and post-doctoral work at Bristol Myers Squibb in the United States under the supervision of Dr. San Kiang.

Since then, Álvarez has primarily been a researcher, former director (2004-2010) of the Centro de Biotecnología FEMSA (FEMSA Center for Biotechnology), a biotechnology research facility in the city of Monterrey, which he founded. The center mainly develops food and pharmaceutical products (and processes) using a wide tool box that includes genetic engineering strategies, bioprocess engineering, biomedical engineering, and more classical biochemistry concepts. The Centro de Biotecnología-FEMSA is today one of the most productive research organizations of the Tec de Monterrey system.

In 2007, Álvarez initiated the Biopharmaceutical Research Group at Tecnológico de Monterrey, a unit that became one of the most important research groups in this area in Latin America. Its activities have included the creation of a way to mass-produce a vaccine against the AH1N1 virus during the 2009 outbreak. Later, Álvarez's group became involved in the design and fabrication of Chips capable to produce monoclonal antibodies through anchorage dependent mammalian cell culture.

Álvarez's personal research specialties include design of bio-reactors, transport phenomena (particularly mixing), micro and nanotechnologies for biological applications, mathematical modeling of biological systems, tissue engineering, bioprinting, and point-of-care diagnostic. Álvarez has published more than 150 articles in prestigious international journals in his field (ei., Nature Reviews Materials, Advanced Materials, ACS Nano, PNAS, Scientific Reports, Biomaterials, Biofabrication, among others), along with presenting in over one hundred international forums and conferences. He has directed more than 40 theses at the doctorate and masters level.

Álvarez's research work has been recognized by the Mexican government with Level III membership in the Sistema Nacional de Investigadores, the highest rank for a Mexican investigator.

Álvarez has an H index of 41 (according to Scopus) and 52 (according to Scholar Google). He has been cited more than 10,000 times in scientific publications including Nature, PNAS, and Physical Review Letters.

== See also ==
List of Monterrey Institute of Technology and Higher Education faculty
