= Roland Rugero =

- Born: February 22, 1986 (age 39) near Bujumbura, Burundi
- Occupation(s): Journalist, author
- Notable work: Les Onriques Baho!

Roland Rugero (born February 22, 1986) is a Burundian author, journalist, and director. His second work Baho! is the second Burundian novel to ever be translated to English. His work on promoting Burundian culture has led him to be recognized internationally in such programs as the University of Iowa's International Writing Program.

== Early life ==
Rugero was born near Bujumbura, Burundi as the eldest of six children. At the age of seven, Rugero and his family fled to Rwanda in September 1993, following the assassination of President Melchior Ndadaye and the resulting Tutsi genocide. In December, he and his family returned to Burundi for only a short time before fleeing to Tanzania at the time President Cyprien Ntaryamira was assassinated. Rugero returned to Burundi as a young adult and pursued a career in writing, becoming a journalist in 2008.

== Career ==
Following his education, Rugero began his career as a journalist. From early on, he worked against his own criticisms of Burundian journalism, claiming that "Burundian journalism today suffers doubly: first, as journalism does throughout the world...from predatory powers, and second, for not properly demonstrating and giving full justice to the formidable space of expression taking place in Burundi." Shortly after starting this work, he began writing stories and publishing his first novel Les Onriques in 2008. Rather than explicitly choosing to broaden his writing beyond journalism, Rugero claims that he merely realized his ability to tell stories. In general, he claims a deep love for writing and a self-proclaimed importance to do so for the present time. According to an interview in 2013, he feels an urgency to write and to be a witness to this time.

One of Rugero's career goals has been to promote literary culture in Burundi. In 2011, he co-founded Samandari, a literary workshop that meets weekly in Bujumbura. He also helped launch the French-language short-story competition Prix Michel Kayoya and the English-language Andika Prize.

In addition to promoting Burundian literature, Rugero is also one of the nation's few directors. His film Amaguru n'Amaboko is known for being the second ever feature film to come out of Burundi, as well as for being the only film that uses the language Kirundi.

== Writing ==
Politics and the sociocultural state of Burundi has been an influence and pivotal subject to Rugero and his writings since the beginning of his career. In addition to the political impacts on Burundian journalism, he also puts emphasis in the political nature of fiction writing. "Fiction that recounts the human, in all its forms," he says, "is always political." Rather than citing literary influences, Rugero finds much influence in language. He highlights the importance of language in his novel Baho! with the strong use and emphasis on his native language Kirundi.

By focusing on language in translation, Rugero uses his works to debate past colonialism and its lasting effects on Burundian identity. Because of French colonialism, a bulk of the literature in Burundi is written in French and largely imported. Rugero describes the major effect of this to be an overwhelming sense of elitism that many Burundian associate with literature. In addition to his Kirundi writing programs, his focus on language and Kirundi preservation works towards bringing literature to a more inviting level in Burundian society. As a result, he hopes the self-discovery attributed to experiencing literature will help Burundi come to terms with its past and move forward with a more defined united cultural identity.

== Bibliography ==
- Les Onriques (2007)
- Baho! (2012)
