= Julio César Gutiérrez Vega =

Mexican physicist

- Citizenship: Mexican
- Education: Monterrey Institute of Technology (ITESM) the National Institute of Astrophysics, Optics and Electronics (INAOE).
- Scientific career
- Fields: Optics
- Workplaces: Center for Optics, Monterrey Institute of Technology.
- Doctoral advisor: Sabino Chávez Cerda

Julio César Gutiérrez Vega is a Mexican physicist who has done pioneering work on wave propagation of optical fields; in particular, he introduced the Mathieu family of non-diffracting optical beams (with Sabino Chávez Cerda) and the Helmholtz-Gauss beams —a parabolic family of non-diffracting optical beams— with Miguel A. Bandrés. His research work is done with the Monterrey Institute of Technology and Higher Education's (Tec de Monterrey) Optics Center, of which he is the director. This work has been recognized with membership in Mexican Academy of Sciences and Level III membership in the Sistema Nacional de Investigadores.

== Life ==
Gutiérrez Vega is from Zamora, Michoacán. He studied at the Monterrey Institute of Technology and Higher Education, Monterrey Campus at the insistence of his family although he wanted to go to Guadalajara with the majority of his friends. His family also insisted that he study physics instead of his preference of mathematics. He began his studies part time in 1987, but did not finish his BS until 1991 in industrial physics. Immediately after, he studied his masters in electrical engineering, obtaining this degree in 1995, both from the Tec de Monterrey. After some years in the field, he returned to earn his doctorate in optics from the National Institute of Astrophysics, Optics and Electronics, with a stint in Belgium before graduating in 2000.

He is currently married with one child born in 2011 and lives in Monterrey.

== Career ==
After finishing his master's degree, Gutiérrez Vega spent some years working in fiber optics, participating in projects in various parts of Mexico. After his doctorate, he moved into research, joining the Optics Center of the physic department at Tec de Monterrey, Campus Monterrey when it was established by the school system. He became the center's director in 2005 and is also the head of the Photonics and Mathematical Optics Group. The Optics Center researches lasers, fiber optics and more, both in theory and practical applications. Gutiérrez Vega considers the center is "second family."

Personal research fields primarily are nondiffracting propagation of wavefields, solutions of the Helmholtz and paraxial wave equation: Mathieu, parabolic and Ince-Gaussian beams, laser resonators, numerical methods of special function and quantum and classical billiards. His areas of expertise include wave propagation, laser beam shaping and laser cavities.

He has authored and co-authored more than 145 articles in international academic journals, conference proceedings and books.

== Recognition ==
Gutiérrez Vega's research work has been recognized with membership in the Mexican Academy of Sciences (since 2004), and Level III membership in Mexico's Sistema Nacional de Investigadores. He won the awards at Tec de Monterrey for his teaching as well as the Rómulo Garza Prize for his research work. He was also the first Mexican to be named senior member of the International Society of Optics and Photonics, serving in this organization as conference chair, editor, student chapter advisor and more. In 2020, he was elected a Fellow and won the Esther Hoffman Beller Medal from The Optical Society "for exceptional commitment to optics education through extraordinary academic mentoring and teaching; the development of original, engaging teaching materials and the establishment of a world-class optics graduate program." The Society also elected him a Fellow.

== See also ==
- List of Monterrey Institute of Technology and Higher Education faculty
- List of Monterrey Institute of Technology and Higher Education alumni
