= Karen Villeda =

Mexican writer, digital artist (born 1985)

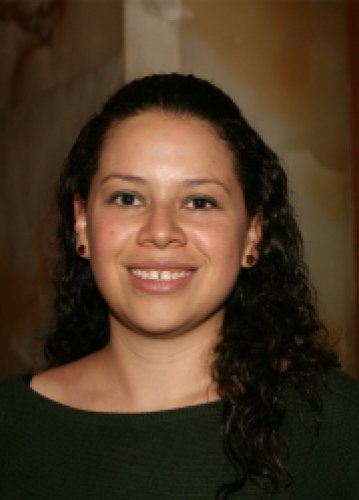
- Villeda in 2017
- Born: 4 July 1985 (age 41); Tlaxcala de Xicohténcatl, Tlaxcala, Mexico
- Education: Monterrey Institute of Technology and Higher Education, Latin American Faculty of Social Sciences, Central European University (CEU).
- Writing career
- Language: Spanish
- Genres: Poetry, essay, digital art
- Website: poetronica.net/home.html

Karen Villeda (born 4 July 1985) is a Mexican writer, poet, and digital artist.

== Biography ==
Villeda was born in Tlaxcala, Mexico, in 1985. She began writing at age 9, and had her first poem published in a local newspaper after attending a literary workshop at age 16. She published her first book of poetry at age 18, and studied International Affairs at the Monterrey Institute of Technology and Higher Education. Her interest in poetry and its relation with various technological resources began with LABO: laboratory of cyberpoetry.

Her poetry has been translated to several languages, including Arabic, English, French, German and Portuguese.

Her work as poet is part of the Archive of Hispanic Literature on Tape of the Library of Congress (2015) and she is one of the few Mexican writers in the archive. Part of her digital work is in the third volume of Electronic Literature Collection of the Massachusetts Institute of Technology.

She was the editor-in-chief of the Este País. In 2015, she became the Fall resident of the International Writing Program (IWP) at the University of Iowa, and was selected as the IWP Outreach Fellow.

Her website POETronicA includes works that incorporate hypertext, visuals, and video. She also collaborated with Denise Audirac to create the 2014 project POETuitéame, which incorporates and remixes content from Twitter.

== Critical reception ==
In 2016, Rachel Rose of The Fiddlehead wrote "her writing shows her to be a fierce advocate of children's rights, especially those children who have left Mexico and moved north, to the US, bringing the traumas of linguistic, social and geographic dislocation with them."

In a review of Visegrado for Words Without Borders, Charlotte Whittle wrote, "Villeda eschews objectivity, sending us postcards of highly distilled observations as she wanders her chosen territory, carrying the weight of home in her backpack. Villeda's "micro-essays" make up a truly hybrid text that is at once travel notebook, literary criticism, and prose poem."

Daniel Escandell Montiel wrote in Literatura Mexicana, "POETronicA is a web project that brings together Villeda's poetic creations that transcend paper and, within it, POETuitéame is a turning point that definitely opens the way to a natively electronic poetic writing by the author, as opposed to the preceding texts, inspired, based on or derived from the most traditional poetry collections (that is, printed), by the author from Tlaxcala. If Villeda is described in profiles such as the one in the Encyclopedia of Literature in Mexico as a "poet and net-artist" (2011), it is evident that POETuitéame has been a fundamental piece to enhance her international weight as a digital artist."

== Bibliography ==
Poetry collections

- 2021: Anna y Hans. Fondo de Cultura Económica.
- 2014: Constantinopla. Posdata Ediciones.
- 2014: Dodo. Fondo Editorial Tierra Adentro.
- 2011: Babia. Ediciones de Punto de Partida.
- 2010: Tesauro. Fondo Editorial Tierra Adentro.
- 2005: La caja de los recuerdos o la instrucción para recordarnos. ITC y Consejo Nacional para la Cultura y las Artes (CONACULTA).

Essay collections

- 2019: Agua de Lourdes. Ser mujer en México. (2019). Turner.
- 2017: Visegrado. Almadía.
- 2016: Tres. Cuadrivio Ediciones.

Children's books

- 2016: Pelambres. Pearson.
- 2015: Cuadrado de Cabeza. El mejor detective del mundo (o eso cree él).

== Honors and awards ==
- 2005 IV National Award of Poetry for Children Narciso Mendoza
- 2008 Poetry Prize from Punto de Partida magazine
- 2013 Elías Nandino National Prize for Young Poetry
- 2014 Fine Arts Prize of Children's Story for Cuadrado de cabeza
- 2014 Mexico City Youth Award
- 2016 Clemencia Isaura National Poetry Award
- 2017 Clemencia Isaura National Poetry Award
- 2017 José Revueltas Literary Essay Fine Arts Award 2017 for Visegrad: literary micro-essays from Hungary, Poland
- 2019 Gilberto Owen National Literature Award
- 2020 Ignacio Manuel Altamirano National Poetry Award for Anna and Hans
