= The National Agriculture and Trade Show (Belize) =

The National Agriculture and Trade Show (NATS) which was established in the year 1970, is an annual public event that is held in Belmopan city which is the capital of Belize. It is a family oriented event created in order for farmers as well as numerous businesses and organizations to showcase and sell their products to the Belizean public. Approximately 40,000 to 45,000 individuals visit the Trade Show over the three days that it is held for.

== History ==
The first Agriculture Show was first held in Belize City on April 2 and 3, 1937. The following are some of the earlier records of when the NATS was held.

Year	Brief Description
1947	A successful Agriculture Show was organized in the Stann Creek District. The show included industrial, horticultural as well as agricultural exhibits. The objective of the Agriculture Show that year was to demonstrate to the public what can be grown and made locally in Belize.
1962	In October of this particular year, another successful Agriculture Show was held in the Cayo District. At this event, the idea of having the National Agriculture Show was developed.
1970	The first National Agriculture and Trade Show was held in Belmopan, Cayo on November 14 and 15.

== What is the Trade Show all about ==
The Agriculture Show grounds spread over 60 acres (24 ha) on the banks of Roaring Creek Village. Love FM's main stage is always the main event of the day where Belize's leading band, the Gilharry 7 from Corozal Town would perform alongside other Belizean artists such as Supa G, Harlem Youths, Vida and Sheldon, Chico Ramos as well as the Sweet Pain band.

Apart from the entertainment, drinks and products, there are a variety of food from all parts of Belize, Mexico and Guatemala that are readily available to the visitors throughout the day. Some of these foods range from Tamales and Tacos to Rice and Beans with Stew Chicken and Barbecue. There are numerous mechanical rides that are brought in from the neighboring country Guatemala such as Ferris wheels and games of fortune for the young and old to enjoy. The attractions of the show include:

- Judging of crops and livestock displays
- Judging of commercial and industrial display booths
- Tractor operation contest
- Coconut husking contest
- Aerial spraying display
- Selection of Miss Agriculture
- Musical Entertainment by local musicians/groups
- Horse riding
- Honoring of Farmer of the Year
- Rodeo
- Dog Show
- Canoe Race
- Motocross Show

== Importance of the National Agriculture and Trade Show ==
With Agriculture being one of the most profitable industries in Belize, The National Agriculture and Trade Show (NATS) focuses on the importance of agriculture through education, by demonstrating how the agricultural sector contributes to Belize's economy. The National Agriculture and Trade Show (NATS) also emphasizes the importance of food security. This event usually occurs near the end of April or on the first weekend of May.
