= Jana Beňová =

Slovak poet and novelist

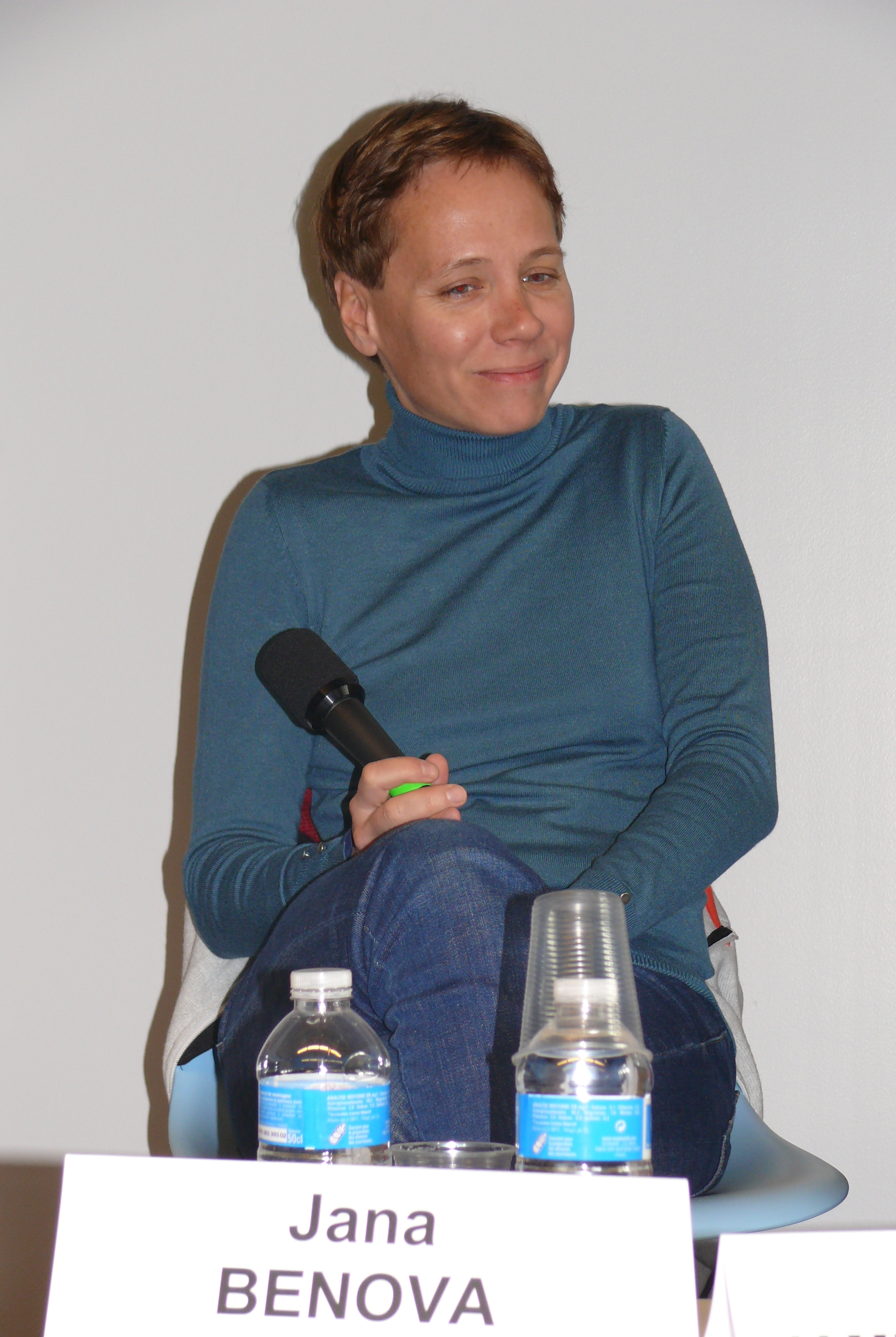
Beňová in 2016

Jana Beňová (born 1974) is a Slovak poet and novelist. She studied at the Academy of Music and Dramatic Arts in Bratislava, graduating with a degree in dramaturgy in 1998. She wrote for a number of local publications, including Dotyky, Fragment and Slovenské Pohľady. She also worked for the daily newspaper SME under a pseudonym. At present, she works at the Theatre Institute in Bratislava.

Her first book of poems Svetloplachý came out in 1993, followed by further collections Lonochod and Nehota. She wrote a novel called Parker (2001), and a collection of short stories, Dvanásť poviedok a Ján Med (2003). In 2008, she published Plán odprevádzania (Seeing People Off), subtitled Café Hyena. This book won the EU Prize for Literature. She has written another novel called Preč! Preč! (Get off! Get off!).

In 2012, she participated in the International Writing Program's Fall Residency at the University of Iowa in Iowa City, IA.
