= Freightliner-Daimler México =

- Company type: S. de R.L.
- Industry: Automotive
- Founded: February 27, 2009
- Headquarters: Mexico City, Mexico
- Products: Commercial vehicles diesel engines
- Owner: Daimler Truck
- Parent: Daimler Trucks North America
- Website: www.freightliner.com.mx

Freightliner-Daimler Vehículos Comerciales México, S. de R. L. de C.V. is a manufacturer of trucks and tractors of American origin. Based in Mexico City, its first plant in the country opened its doors in Saltillo, Coahuila on February 27, 2009.

== History ==
Thanks to the association with Daimler AG that was founded in 2007 in Mexico, they formed a wide network of manufacturers and distribution of trucks and buses in Mexico. Its plants are located in the State of Mexico, Saltillo and Coahuila.

Currently, the group is led by Flavio Rivera, who pointed out that in 2017, Freightliner showed an increase above the market with a 46 percent increase compared to the two-month period of the previous year.

== Models ==
Approximately 300 thousand Freightliner models have been made in Mexico's production plants throughout history, including:

- Freightliner M2
- Freightliner Columbia (122SD in North America)
- Freightliner Cascadia
- FL 360
