= Hans Backoff Escudero =

Hans Backhoff Escudero (September 19, 1946 – August 15, 2017) was a Mexican winemaker whose work in establishing the Monte Xanic winery helped to establish the wine industry in Baja California. His wines were the first from Mexico to receive international recognition.

== Life ==
Backhoff was born in Ensenada, Baja California to a German father and Mexican mother. The area did have winemaking when he was young and he had some exposure to it. Backhoff's father had a farm called Los Alamitos in the Valle de Guadalupe, where they grew fruit trees. They went every Sunday to pick fruit and then sell it to support the family of five children.

He studied biochemical engineering at Monterrey Tech, graduating in 1971. Living in England for five years and with a scholarship from the Mexican government, he earned his doctorate in food science from the University of Nottingham.

He returned to Mexico after getting his doctorate, first teaching classes in wine, cheese and beer production at Guaymas campus of Monterrey Tech. He also worked for a time with various installations as technical director with Tropicana, focusing on the canning of fruit products.

Backhoff married Leticia Guerrero Mendoza in 1970. The couple had three children, Karla (1972), Hans Joseph (1977) and Kristel (1988).

Backhoff died in San Diego, California in 2017.

== Wine experience ==
Backhoff knew since he was young that he wanted to work with wine. His degrees in Mexico and the UK were in preparation for winemaking. He was convinced that the Guadalupe Valley could produce world-class grapes and wines.

In 1972, he began producing his own wine at home, in very small quantities, an activity he did for fifteen years until he was able to obtain financial backing to open a winery. Hans Backhoff was invited to the New Port to Ensenada regatta yearly boat race. While they were drinking beer on the other boats, Backhoff was drinking wine he had made at home. He shared some with other participants which led to interest in expanding operations.

== Monte Xanic ==
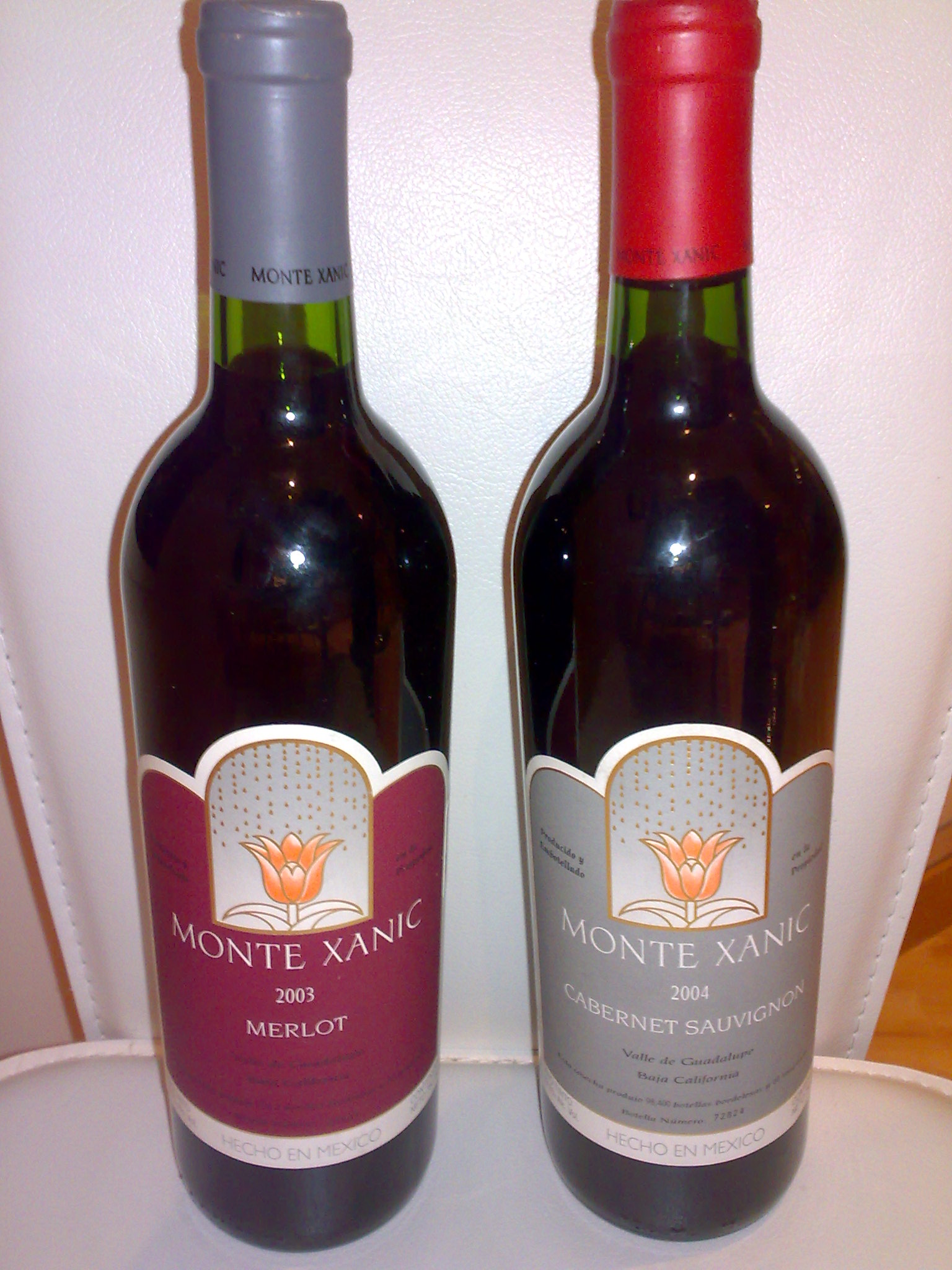
Two wines from the Monte Xanic vineyards

Monte Xanic was founded in 1987 (some sources say 1988) with several friends and partners, Tomas B. Fernandez, Manuel Castro, Eric R. W. Hagsater and Richard C. Hojel. Xanic is from the Cora language and means “the flower that blooms after the first rain,” referring a local desert phenomenon.

The goal from the beginning was to produce world class wines, with Backhoff assuming the role of oenologist. It was a risky move as the Mexican government had just signed onto NAFTA, opening Mexican markets to more imported wines. Mexican wine consumers were skeptical that the country could produce a quality product.

The vineyard started with 80 hectares, with the first harvest in 1989 producing 6,200 cases of Chenin Colombard and Cabernet Sauvignon.

Operations are a mix of new technologies and traditional methods. He experimented with many new techniques but not all were suited to the area's climate. One of the main issues is the high temperatures in the summer, which can damage grapes. This is followed by concerned about the availability and salinity of water supplies. Monte Xanic implemented a new irrigation system designed by the University of California, Davis meant to optimize water usage. The winery also pioneered other techniques such as micro oxygenation (MOX) and night harvesting of white grapes.

By 1993, the winery was selling 8,500 cases a year. In 2000, Xanic formed an alliance with the Wine Chalone Group to enter the U.S. market. By 2003, sales were up to 40,000 cases.

From the beginning the winery has focused on quality over quantity; nonetheless, Xanic is the third largest producer of wines in Mexico. It has about 100 hectares on six properties evenly divided in the Guadalupe and Ojos Negros valleys. The winery produces about 450,000 liters annually, sold in Mexico, France, Germany, the United States and Canada. It produces Cabernet Sauvignon, Merlot, Cabernet Franc, Petit Verdot, Malbec, Sauvignon blanc, Chenin blanc, Syrah and Chardonnay. Major labels of the winery include Gran Ricardo, Ediciones Limitadas, Monte Xanic and Monte Xanic Calixa. Backhoff named a Sauvignon Blanc after his youngest daughter Kristel.

In 2008, his son, Hans Backhoff Guerrero, became general director of Monte Xanic and currently runs the company in that capacity. Backoff senior remained oenologist until he died, only ten days after the winery celebrated its 30th anniversary.

== Development of region's wine industry ==
His work was fundamental to the development of what is now the "Wine Route" of Baja California, with the Guadalupe Valley producing 85% of Mexico's wines. In 1992, he founded the free magazine El Espiritu del Vino, to promote area wines, and founded the Fiestas of Vendimia as a member of the Club de Banqueros de México.

In 2000, he founded the Pro-vino Committee with several others to promote winemaking and tourism in the Valley. Monte Xanic alone receives about 37,000 visitors annually.

== Recognition ==
Calling Monte Xanic "the project of his life," Backhoff, was a main driver in the establishment of modern Mexican winemaking. His work brought Mexican wines to international attention. He said that one satisfaction from his work is that so many people in the area now have employment. The wine industry has raised standards of living in the area. Monte Xanic itself supports about 150 families.

Backhoff helped to found and competed in Mexico's first wine competition in 1993. In the 2000s, wines of the Guadalupe Valley began competing internationally, with Monte Xanic winning its first awards in 2010. By 2013, the winery was winning numerous awards in the United States and France. As of his death, Backhoff's wines won over 260 medals in various international competitions.

Backhoff was named one of the five best oenologists by Wine Masters Challenge in Estoril, Portugal and the Club de Banqueros de México. In 2015, Forbes named Monte Xanic emblematic in the production of wine in Mexico. At the 30th anniversary, he received an award from the Club de Banqueros for his career and his role in developing the local economy.

== See also ==
- Mexican wine
