= Arturo Molina Sosa =

Mexican politician (1934–2017)

- Born: Arturo Molina Sosa; 11 August 1934; Oaxaca, Mexico
- Died: 4 December 2017 (aged 83); Oaxaca, Mexico
- Occupation: Gynecologist

Arturo Molina Sosa (11 August 1934 – 4 December 2017) was a Mexican gynecologist and politician.

== Biography ==
Arturo Molina Sosa was born in Oaxaca on 11 August 1934. His mother was Porfiria Sosa, a Mexican recognized obstetrician He became surgeon after graduating from the National Autonomous University of Mexico in 1958. In 1960 he became a gynecologist and obstetrician in the General Hospital of Mexico.

In addition to his medical career he was Secretary of Public Health in Oaxaca, political activist, union activist, legislator, principal of the Hospital "Dr. Aurelio Valdivieso", Professor at the UNAM, UABJO and the University of Guadalajara.,

Molina Sosa died in Oaxaca on 4 December 2017, at the age of 83.

== Medical career ==
Molina Sosa developed as a gynecologist and obstetrician in the hospital Dr. Aurelio Valdivieso in Oaxaca, where he practiced his teaching and became principal In the private practice he developed as a physician in a hospital in Oaxaca.

For 35 years he worked in different administrative and medical posts in the Civil Hospital in Oaxaca. His perspective about the medical service offered by the hospitals in Oaxaca is that it needs the proper resources that will rank them at a satisfactory level. For him health is a right of all as equals and not a privilege granted to certain classes or social groups. Molina Sosa said that his service to society as a physician and human is due to the teachings of his mother, whom he provided assistance to the humble community in times where there weren’t technological developments in Oaxaca. The legislator Reyes Retana said at the ceremony that dedicated to Molina by the State of Oaxaca to commemorate his years of service that his career has left a trail of awareness, perseverance, effort and perseverance led by their love of State and the Mexican people.

== Political career ==
Molina Sosa served as a local deputy in the LI Legislature of the Congress of Oaxaca as a member of the Institutional Revolutionary Party (PRI) from 1980 to 1983. He was Secretary of Health of Oaxaca between 1985 and 1986. He was director of the State Medical Arbitration Commission of Oaxaca known (CEAMO) where he contributed to the development of protocols.

As a politician he improved the right to health among the people in Oaxaca, is the case of natives who gave birth in the street caused by inattention., In his political career he has helped to strengthen, restore and modernize medical institutions such as IMSS, ISSSTE and Public Health Services. Similarly, he founded the College of Obstetrics and Gynecology in Oaxaca.

== Recognition ==
- 1992, he was awarded the National Prize for Surgery "Doctor Gonzalo Castañeda”
- 2011, the Mexican Academy and Regional Surgery Southeast University (URSE) bestowed the title of Master Emeritus to Molina.
- 2012, The Government of Oaxaca awarded him the distinction "Distinguished Citizen", which is awarded annually to individuals who have demonstrated vivid serve society. In the case of Dr. Molina Sosa, he obtained for his long career in pro health of the citizens of the state.
- 2013, The Health Service of Oaxaca awarded him a recognition for 52 years of public and private medical career as an obstetrician-gynecologist.

== Affiliation ==
- Member of the Mexican Academy of General Surgery.
- Member of the Medical College of Oaxaca.
- Member of the Society of Gynecology and Obstetrics of Oaxaca.
- Member of the Medical Society of General Hospital. "Dr. Aurelio Valdivieso".
- Honorary Member of the Ecuadorian Society of Gynecology and Obstetrics.
- Member of the Mexican Association for the Study of Human Reproduction and Fertility.
- Member of the Mexican Association of Ultrasound in Federation of Gynecology and Obstetrics Medicine.
- Member Mexican Association of Gynecologic Endoscopy and Microsurgery.

Asociaciones de Ginecología y Obstetricia.
