= Daniel Moska Arreola =

Mexican academic

Daniel Moska Arreola is a professor and director with the Monterrey Institute of Technology and Higher Studies (Tec de Monterrey), who has created various educational and business programs both with the institution and outside of it.

Moska Arreola is from Ciudad Constitución, Baja California Sur. His father was a bank manager and then municipal president in the 1975, when the area was prosperous from cotton farming. As a boy Moska Arreola worked in a bakery. He first studied high school with the Tec de Monterrey, then studying his bachelor's in public accounting and finance, then a master's in finance and administrative sciences at the Monterrey campus. He then went on to study a second master's and doctorate in finance at Tulane University in Texas.

Although he has worked as a manager with Aceros Santa Rosa and was chief of administrative information at the Gamesa plant in Monterrey, the focus of his career has been with his first alma mater. He has taught classes at the undergraduate and graduate levels in finance, financial information for decision making, receiving awards for this work in 1994 and 2001. He has been a visiting professor at Baylor University in Texas and at the ESCP-EAP European School of Management in Paris and given classes in Central and South America.

Moska Arreola's first major administrative post was the director of the accounting and finance department of Campus Monterrey. He then went on to become the director of the business school at the Guadalajara campus. There he created the doctorate program in public accounting at the school and founded the Centro de Consultoría e Investigación Empresarial y Financiera (Business Consulting and Research Center), the Aceleradora de Empresa (Business Accelerator), the Club de Inversionistas (Investors' Club) and the Programa de Líderes Académicos (Academic Leaders' Program) .

In 2008, he became the direction of the business school for the Mexico City area campuses. At the Mexico City and Santa Fe campuses, he worked on applications for mobile technology in learning as well as developed the Centro de Consultoría e Innovación Empresarial y Financiera (Financial and Business Center for Consulting and Innovation and the Parque Empresarial (Entrepreneur Park). The latter won the National Export Prize in 2010 for the Mexico City Campus.

In 2010 he became director of the Santa Fe campus.

Moska Arreola has worked a number of joint ventures both inside and outside of the Tec de Monterrey system. He is the founding director of the Reportes Financieros Burkenroad program with the Tec de Monterrey, which was developed jointly with the International Bank for Reconstruction and Development, Tulane University, the Universidad de los Andes in Colombia and Instituto de Estudios Superiores de Administración in Venezuela. He is also a member of the technical committee for the Mejores Empresas Mexicanas project, partnering with Deloitte, Banamex, Grupo Imagen and the Tec de Monterrey.

He has invited to present on topics in various conferences in Mexico and abroad. He was the president of the Instituto de Contadores Públicos in Nuevo León, an affiliate of the Instituto Mexicano de Contadores Públicos and is a member of the Comisión de Principios de Contabilidad of the Instituto Mexicano de Contadores Públicos.
