= Monte Xanic =

Mexican winery

Monte Xanic is Mexico's first boutique winery. Located in the Valle de Guadalupe, it was founded by five partners with the aim of making the best wine possible in the country. Despite economic and cultural challenges, the winery started a revolution in Mexican wine making. It has been credited with establishing the current status of the Valle de Guadalupe for wine, both in Mexico and abroad.

== History ==
Monte Xanic is located in the Valle de Guadalupe, which has a spotty history related to wine making. Grapes and wine making were introduced here by the Jesuits to make sacramental wine, but in 1595, Spanish authorities forbade the planting of grapes and ordered the destruction of vineyards to protect Spanish winemaking. This set winemaking in Mexico back centuries, but it was not completely eradicated in Baja California due to its distance from colonial authorities. Large scale production began again in the late 19th century and into the 20th with Russian immigrants.

Wine making continued but nothing of premium quality. In 1987, Monte Xanic was founded as Mexico's first boutique winery with the goal of making the best wine possible, regardless of cost. It was started by five men Hans Backoff, Manuel Castro, Tomas Fernandez, Eric Hagsater and Ricardo Hojel with the idea of producing only 10,000 cases per year. The name Xanic was that of the daughter of Hagsater, which means “flower that blooms after the first rain” in the Cora language.

It was a risky move as the country had just opened to foreign wines and other small wineries were going out of business. In 1987, the Mexican wine industry was heavily affected by a legal ruling that opened the country to foreign wines. Small wineries could not compete, especially since Mexican wine consumers assumed foreign products were superior and doubted the country could even make decent wine. Wines from Spain, France, Chile, Argentina and the United States dominated. In the mid 1980s only major wineries such as L.A. Cetto and Domecq were surviving. These mass-produced wines of only average quality. Add to this that Mexico before the 1980s had a tradition of toasting occasions with distilled spirits, beer and even soft drinks rather than wine.

The main driving force behind the winery was oenologist Hans Backhoff, whose homemade wines inspired the others to invest in the venture. Unlike other wine producers, he did not believe that Baja's climate was too hot and dry to produce premium grapes. He decided that world-class quality could be achieved by monitoring factors no one else was paying attention to. One of the first things he worked to control in his whites was the fermentation temperature. Backhoff brought in Bordeaux varieties: Petite Verdot, Malbec, Cabernet Franc, Merlot and Chenin Blanc to Mexico along with Chardonnay and Sauvignon Blanc. Even before they were able to grow most of their own fruit, the winery was willing to pay top dollar for grapes because Backhoff believed that there was no way to make great wine without quality fruit. Backhoff remained the main oenologist from the winery's founding until his death in 2017.

Their very first wines, made from bought grapes, were Chenin Colombard and Cabernet Sauvignon, which came out in 1988. The first harvest was in 1989, with 6,200 cases of Chenin Colombard. At the beginning, the winery grounds were densely planted with 1,200 plants per hectare, with the width of the furrows calibrated to that of a US tractor. However, this did not produce flavorful grapes. Nothing in the area was developed for wine at the time. As of the mid-1990s the road to the winery was neither paved nor named as it was the only street in the area.

However, in a few years the wine was selling in Mexico City because savvy wine drinkers liked the flavor and younger generations were more proud of their Mexican culture. The signing of NAFTA was celebrated in Mexico with a 1989 Chardonnay.

Tomas Fernandez left the enterprise after three years. They had to sell directly because they could not compete with the big wineries, with much of the publicity in the beginning being word-of-mouth, making it a cult wine. In 1992 the winery began to publish a free magazine called El Espíritu del Vino. By 1993, the winery was producing 8,500 cases. Xanic wines were not found in supermarkets until 1998 and only in certain upscale ones. This happened because customers asked for it.

Other challenges to Monte Xanic and the rest of the wine industry included the peso crisis of 94-95, the free trade treaty with Chile and the free trade agreement with the European Union, with brought in relatively inexpensive, quality wines. Nonetheless, Monte Xanic's reputation resulted in it being served to dignitaries such as popes John Paul II, Francisco I and Benedict XVI. Vicente Fox had Monte Xanic wines at his 2000 inaugural dinner.

In 2000, Monte Xanic allied with the Wine Chalone Group to enter the U.S. market. Aeromexico began offering Monte Xanic in its wine selection in first class in 2002. By 2003, 40,000 cases and 100 hectares.

From the beginning, the project was to make the best wine in Mexico. Backhoff and Monte Xanic first medals were in Los Angeles in 1988 (one gold and one silver). Since then, Monte Xanic wines have won over 260 medals in international competitions in the United States and Europe, in events such as Wine Masters Challenge in Portugal, the Challenge International du Vine, Riverside International Wine Competition, Pacific Rim Wine Competition, Los Angeles International Wine & Spirits Competition and the World Competition of Brussels. The Sauvignon Blanc 2012 and Gran Ricardo 2011 won gold medals in Bordeaux. In 2014, Backhoff was one of five oenologists of the year at the Wine Masters Challenge in Estoril, Portugal.

Mexican wine consumption is still very low to about 800 ml per person per year (up from 200 in 2000), but it is increasing. It grew ten percent just from 2016 to 2017. Even though Mexican wine sales are still only 30% from domestic sources, it is enough that most of Monte Xanic's production is sold in its home country.

The success of Monte Xanic spurred a major wine industry in the Valle de Guadalupe, which now attracts about a million tourist per year. 34,000 of them visit the Monte Xanic vineyard, 40% of whom are Americans. Monte Xanic remodeled the facilities at the main vineyard and in 2014, began giving tours of the facilities.

As wine is a competitive industry, Monte Xanic and other major producers have invested millions of pesos in their facilities to compete with international wines. In 2014, the winery upgraded all of its machinery. In January 2017, the Company received ISO 9001 certification for its processes in harvesting and wine production.

In 2017, the company invested 15 million pesos to increase production 40% over the next three years to between 60,000 and 100,000 cases per year.

Monte Xanic is credited for the renovation of the Mexican wine industry, even prompting old guard producers Domecq, L.A. Cetto and Santo Tomás to work on premium brands. Their success has also attracted many aspiring winemakers to the Valle de Guadalupe including those from Europe and Chile. The wine phenomenon has affected even Ensenada, where wine-themed restaurants are appearing. Before his death, Backhoff noted the wine craze with “everyone wanting to produce” in the valley's now over 100 wineries.

== Current company ==
Today, Monte Xanic is the third largest winery in Mexico.

The main and original facilities are located on what is now called Francisco Zarco road in the Valle de Guadalupe. The Valle is located 30 km northeast of Ensenada and about 100 km south of the U.S. border. They are the northernmost vineyards in Mexico. The properties are in a Mediterranean-type microclimate, 21 km inland between 300 and 400 meters above sea level, separate from the Pacific by a small range of mountains. The cool currents of this ocean bring rain in the winter. The higher humidity is noted with the presence of sycamore trees among the usual shrub. Temperatures vary greatly day and night from as low as 60 °F to as high as 110 °F.

In addition to the three properties in the Valle de Guadalupe proper (Monte Xanic, 7 Leguas and Ole), the winery has also heavily invested in neighboring Ojo Negros Valley with three other properties (Viña Alta, Ojos Negros and Viña la Cienega). The reason for this is the Ojo Negros has a higher elevation and a slightly cooler climate. This is easier on white grapes and allows for the planting of grapes like Pinot Noir.

The main facility is still the original Monte Xanic property, which is also the area that receives visitors. It contains the production facilities and the wine cellar, which was excavated with over 9000 meters of dynamite. It also has an artificial lake, which is used to control water quality. A theatre was built by this lake to host concerts and other events.

Monte Xanic produces about 60,000 cases annually. Despite this volume, the operation is still considered a boutique winery (Competitor Domecque produces 100,000 cases per year with plans to double that).

The wineries is one of the major draws for tourists during the harvest season. They offer guided tours of its vineyards and other facilities. The annual harvest celebration now has major sponsors such as Audi and hosts major musical acts. It also promotes traditional Mexican music and dance such as sons, boleros, and danzons. featuring a concert called the Concierto del Crepúsculo. The winery hosts gastronomic events with major chefs, particularly from Mexico such as Gerardo Vazquez Lugo, Alfredo Villaueva, Paul Bentley, Olivier Deboise and Javier Plascencia. These events focus on the pairing of wines with Mexican dishes. The winery believes that Mexican food can be paired with wine; it is just a matter of knowing how. For example, it is recommended to pair mole with a sweet wine, which complements the sweetness of the sauce.

Hans Joseph Backhoff (son) has taken over as director general from Marc Hojel. He has a degree in food engineering and a masters in oenology.

== Wines ==
Monte Xanic produces about 60,000 cases per year under four major labels: Gran Ricardo, Ediciones Limitadas, Monte Xanic and Monte Xanic Calixa. Monte Xanic is the original brand. Gran Ricardo is a Bordeaux blend, one of the most traditional and expensive in the region. As its name states, Ediciónes Limitadas are limited editions. For example, to celebrate its 30th anniversary, the winery released Bebbiolo Edición Limitada 2016. Calixa is the newest line of more affordable wines. It uses the older French oak barrels no longer suited for Gran Ricardo. While it was launched cautiously in the late 1990s, it has accounted for most of the winery's growth since. Three of the lines are subject to experimentation but Gran Ricardo stays true to traditional French winemaking. Prices range from 150 to 850 Mexican pesos per bottle.

Monte Xanic favors Bordeaux varieties with Malbec growing particularly well. The main grape varieties are Cabernet Sauvignon, Merlot, Cabernet Franc, Petit Verdot, Malbec, Sauvignon Blanc, Chenin Blanc, Syrah, and Chardonnay. When it began, its products were very traditional and conservative. In more recent years, they have integrated some newer ideas in oenology from both sides of the Atlantic. Hans Backhoff (son) has worked to update and evolve the winery's product line to keep pace with the market. In particular, the winery has experimented fruitier and less-oak infused wines. Market studies led to the release of the Calixa line. Their most popular wines are their Cabernet Sauvignon, Malbec, and Chardonnay.

The terroir is very arid. The ground is decomposed granite, which allows for good drainage and gives the grapes a good mineral quality, but can stress the vines. The wines are firm and hardy, with concentrated aromas and flavors and good tannins. The wines’ tones range from dark fruit and chocolate to citrus and freshly cut hay.

Monte Xanic has become the standard to judge other fine Mexican wineries by. Much of the reason is their attention to detail in the production of both grapes and the finished product. The processes are a mix of traditional and modern. The company says they do not have any trade secrets and freely share their experiences with others. The area does present challenges to premium grape growing from very high temperatures, to drought to bouts of high humidity during the late summer harvest. Harvest yields are controlled so that the grapes have concentrated flavor and are of high quality. The work to control both the quantity and quality of the water they use. Drip irrigation and humidity sensors are used, tailored to the different soils of the properties. Salinity of the water is controlled through well testing and the use of the artificial lake. Monte Xanic was the first winery to start harvesting fruit at night. This is particularly important with the white grapes, which are vulnerable to oxidation. The picked grapes are transported in small baskets used in the region for a century.

The winery is one of the first and few to use new technologies to separate the skin from the grape pulp. Fermentation is done at controlled temperatures, and a micro-oxygenation system is used to make the wines more stable and hardy. Wines are aged in a 3,000-barrel cellar in French oak from Alliers and Nevers, the first winery in Mexico to do this.
