= Pablo Reimers Morales =

Pablo Carlos Reimers Morales (July 13, 1946 – January 29, 2014) was an entrepreneur from the state of Zacatecas, Mexico.

He was born July 13, 1946, and raised in Zacatecas until 1961, when he left the state to attend high school at the Monterrey Institute of Technology and Higher Education in Monterrey in 1961. He continued at the school for university, graduating in 1970 with a degree in business administration, with the aim of returning to his home state to be an entrepreneur. He chose to study at the Tec because of its educational model and the respect held in Zacatecas for the industry in Monterrey. One of his aims in high school was to meet the Tec founder Eugenio Garza Sada which he was able to do.

In the very early 1980s, Guillermo Jones Pereda, Juan De Santiago Ortega and Reimers founded Cerámica Santo Niño, today known as Cesantoni. The business began by making ceramic tiles but has since branched out into other ceramic products. The traditional means of making tile in Mexico requires two firings, but he decided to work to find a way to create the product in one firing, succeeding by the end of the 1980s. In 1998, the company worked to automate the process as much as possible, which included replacing many of the existing facilities. Much of the work is now done by robots. The plant works 24 hours a day, 365 days a year and is an important source of employment in the state, not only in the plants but also through its demand for raw materials from mines in the state of Zacatecas.

He has been quoted as saying that making more money is not the purpose of life, but rather go beyond what already exists. In 1985, Reimers was approached by his alma mater to organize and find resources to found a campus of Tec de Monterrey in Zacatecas. A short time later, he became an advisor to the new institution. Today, he is also the president of the Consejo de Enseñanza e Investigación Superior in Zacatecas.

Reimers was married to Gabriela Campos de Reimers and has three sons, Pablo Yaco Reimers Campos, Bernardo Reimers Campos and Hermann Reimers Campos, who work in the company.

Reimers died in Zacatecas on January 29, 2014.
