= Arturo Molina Gutiérrez =

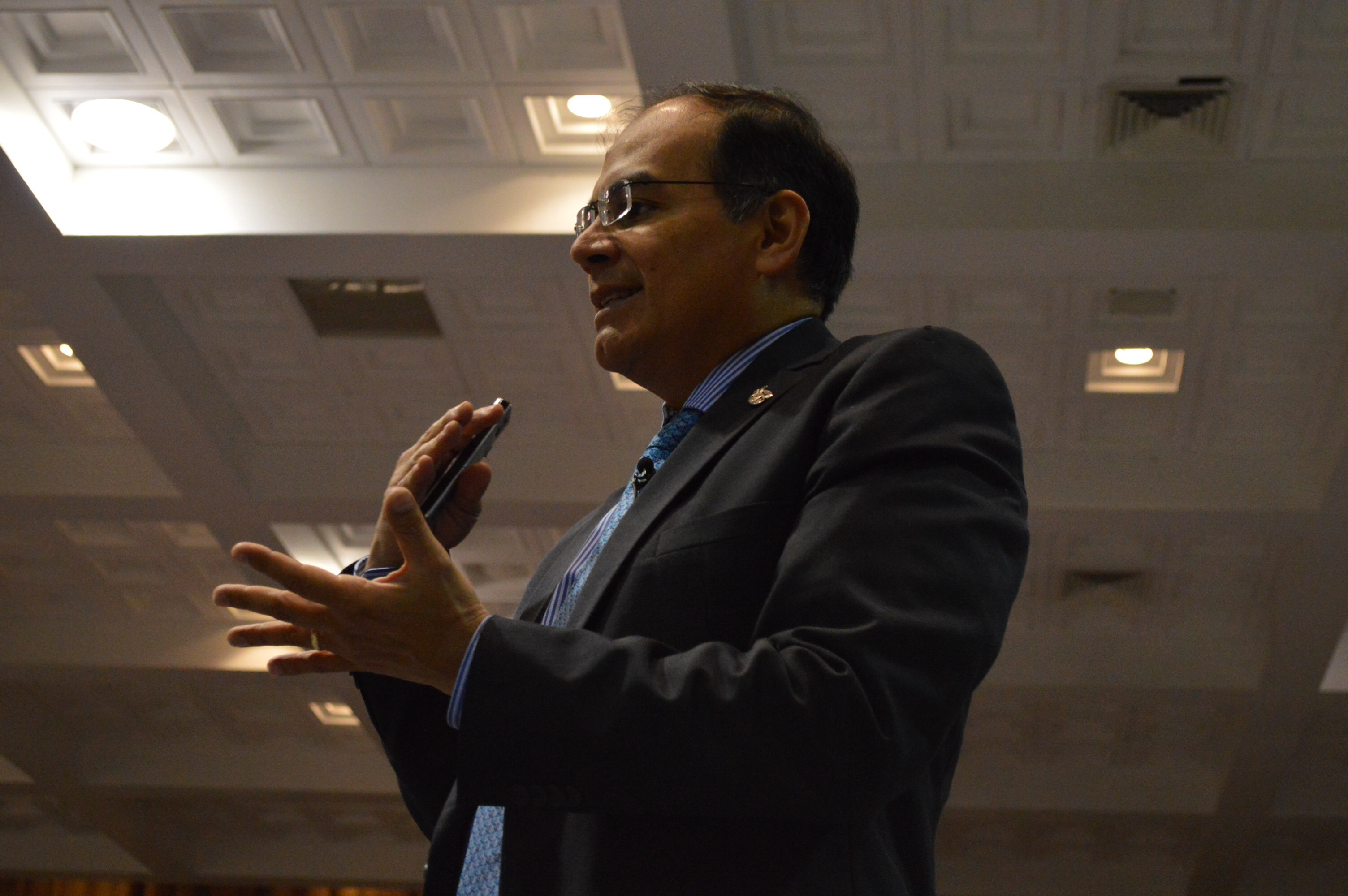
- Born: February 1, 1964 (age 62); Oaxaca, México

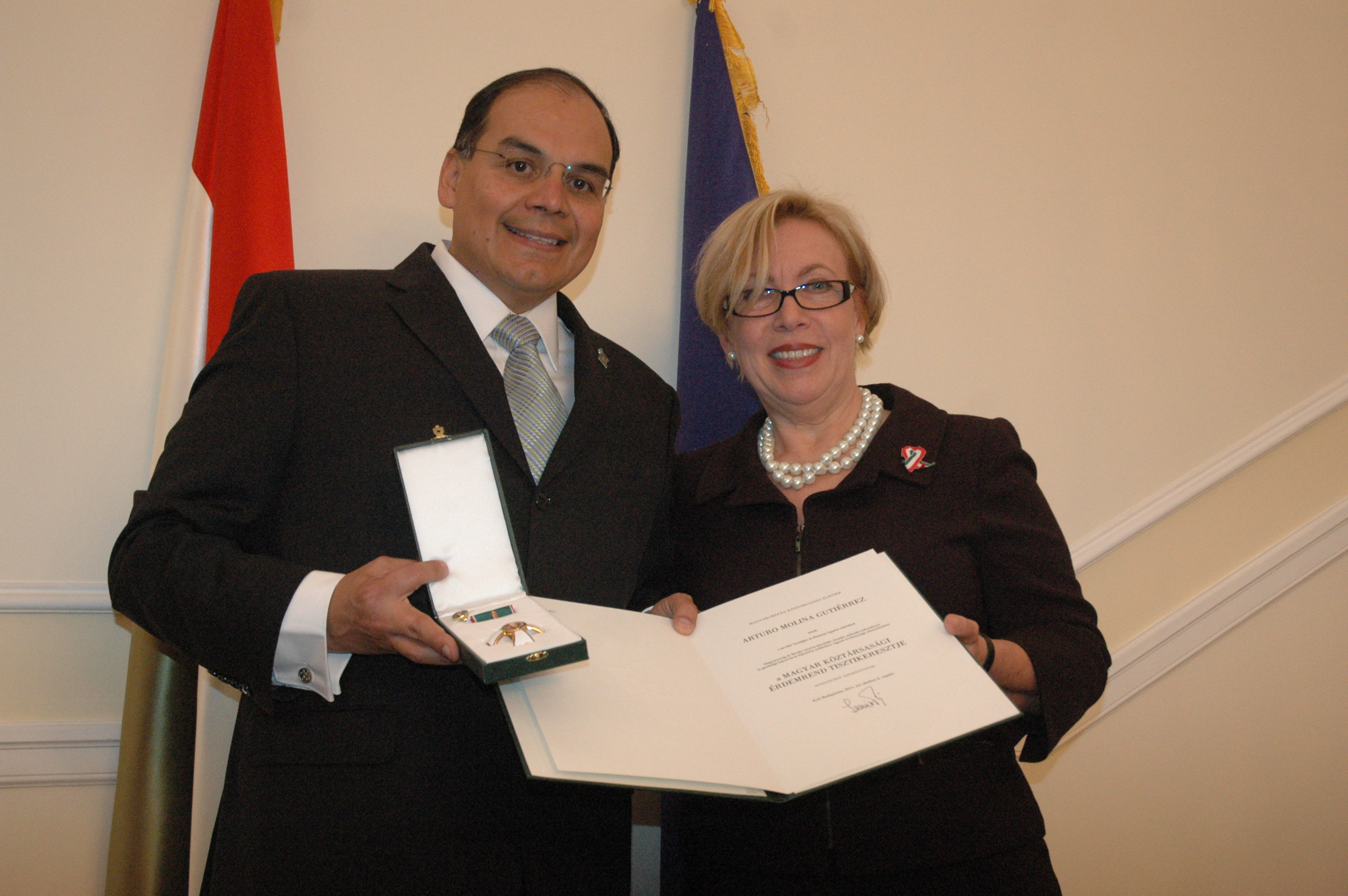
Receiving the Order of Merit of the Republic of Hungary in 2012

Arturo Molina (Oaxaca de Juárez, Oaxaca, 1964) is a Mexican engineer and researcher specializing in computer systems, manufacturing, and advanced materials. He earned a bachelor's degree in Computer Systems Engineering and a master's degree in Computer Science from the Monterrey Institute of Technology and Higher Education (ITESM), Monterrey campus. He later obtained a doctorate in Mechanical Engineering from the Budapest University of Technology and Economics, as well as a doctorate in Manufacturing Systems (Production Engineering) from Loughborough University in England. He was the founder and director of the Institute of Advanced Materials for Sustainable Manufacturing at Tecnológico de Monterrey. He currently serves as Chief Technology Officer (CTO) of IECOS.

== Academia ==
Arturo Molina is a professor in the PhD program in Engineering Sciences at the Monterrey Institute of Technology and Higher Education (ITESM). Between 2003 and 2004, he was a visiting professor and researcher in mechanical engineering at the University of California, Berkeley, with support from the UC MEXUS-CONACYT program.

Since 2013, he has taught the Rapid Development of Innovative Products for Emerging Markets course through the Coursera platform, with which he has participated in the training of more than 55,000 students from more than 118 countries.

== Scientific research areas ==
Arturo Molina Gutiérrez's research areas include concurrent engineering, life cycle engineering, information models for design and manufacturing, and the use of digital technologies applied to the design and manufacture of materials, products, processes, manufacturing systems, and supply chains.

His scientific work as a research professor at Tecnológico de Monterrey has earned him a place on Stanford University's list of the top 2% of scientists in the world. His academic output includes more than 368 publications, with 3,705 citations (excluding self-citations), while Google Scholar counts more than 11,000. Between 2013 and 2024, he achieved a Field-Weighted Citation Impact (FWI) of 1.71 and an h-index of 33.

He has published 19 books with international publishers such as Springer, CRC Press, and Kluwer Academic Press, and has developed technology, obtaining four patents in Mexico, including the transfer of a multifunctional micromachine to educational institutions in Mexico and Costa Rica. He has also supervised 73 master's theses and 13 doctoral dissertations at Tecnológico de Monterrey.

== Scientific contributions ==
- Collaborative Networks and Technological Innovation

Arturo Molina has developed collaborative network models applied to manufacturing and co-innovation, with support from IBM, the Inter-American Development Bank, and the European Union (FP7). These models led to the creation of the science and technology-based company IECOS, as well as high-impact academic publications. Among them are:

Collaborative networked organizations - Concepts and practice in manufacturing enterprises (Google Scholar: 725 citations; WoS: 312; Scopus: 416).

- Intelligent and Sustainable Systems (3S and 5S)

He proposed the concept of "3S Systems (Sensing, Smart, and Sustainable)," later expanded to "5S" (adding Social and Safe). This approach has been applied to energy sustainability projects, such as the Binational Laboratory funded by CONACYT-SENER, and has resulted in academic publications, two books published by Springer, and applications in agriculture (Plots 5.0) and sustainable manufacturing.

- Educational Innovation and Patents

He has promoted educational models based on open innovation laboratories and active learning, in addition to the development of a reconfigurable educational micromachine. These initiatives have been implemented by institutions such as CONALEP, UNAM, and Tecnológico de Monterrey and were recognized with QS Reimagine Education awards in 2018 and 2021. He is also a co-inventor of two patents in micromachine technology and numerical control.

- Academic Production and Talent Development

He has extensive experience in training graduate students, both at the master's and doctoral levels, and has published extensively in the fields of advanced engineering and Education 4.0.

== Consulting ==
Arturo Molina has worked as a consultant for the World Bank and the Inter-American Development Bank. He was a member of the United Nations Working Group on Information Technology and Communities and is a member of the International Federation of Automatic Control (IFAC) and the International Federation of Information Processing (IFIP).

He has served on the editorial boards of academic journals such as Annals of Review of Control, International Journal of Sustainable Engineering, Food and Energy Security, and International Journal of Computer Integrated Manufacturing. In 2012, he participated as a speaker before the Senate of the Republic of Mexico, where he addressed issues related to the Energy Reform. Between 2014 and 2018, he was a member of the Energy Development Council of Nuevo León, and from 2016 to 2019, he was a member of the Board of Directors of the National Institute of Electricity and Clean Energy.

== Business sector ==
He has founded three technology-based companies: IECOS - Engineering Integration and Construction Systems (www.iecos.com) where he holds the position of CTO (Chief Technology Officer), SMES - Solutions for Business Manufacturing Systems, and ALBIOMAR (www.albiomar.com).

== Awards ==
Arturo Molina's work has been recognized with Level III affiliation in the National System of Researchers (SNI). A selection of awards includes:

- Rómulo Garza Insignia Award (2023), for research career achievement, Xignux and Tecnológico de Monterrey.
- Best Paper Award at PRO-VE 2020 - 21st IFIP / SOCOLNET, for the work: Collaborative Networks to Enable Innovation and Entrepreneurship through Open Innovation Centers: The Entrepreneurship Learning Center of Mexico City.
- QS Reimagine Education Awards:
  - Gold Award for Nurturing Employability for the Education 4.0 platform (2021)
  - Gold Award for Nurturing Employability and Main Category Award for educational innovations in employability (2018). ** Silver Award for Nurturing Employability (2018)
- Best Paper Award, ICHE 2017: 19th International Conference on Higher Education, London, UK, for the paper "Open Innovation Lab for the Rapid Realization of Smart, Sustainable, and Learned Products (S3 Products) for Higher Education."
- Rómulo Garza Award (2014), recognizing scientific articles in indexed journals with a high impact factor, for the article "Collaborative Networked Organizations – Concepts and Practice in Manufacturing Companies," co-authored with Nathalíe María Galeano Sánchez.
- Order of Merit of the Republic of Hungary Award (2012), for contributions to the relationship in science, technology, and innovation between Hungary and Mexico.
- * IFAC Outstanding Service Award (2011), important leadership positions at IFAC
- IBM South Fellowship Award (2004), for research on Creative SMEs
- Rómulo Garza Award (1999), in the publications category
- ARIS Award (1999), for research in the area of Business Modeling.

== Affiliations ==
- Member of the Mexican Academy of Sciences
- Member of the Mexican Academy of Engineering
- Member of the Mexican Academy of Computing
- Member of the International Federation of Information Processing
- Member of the International Federation of Automatic Control
- Member of the Working Group on Enterprise Integration Architectures
- Member of the Working Group on Cooperation Infrastructure for Virtual Enterprise and Electronic Business
- Member of the Editorial Board of the journal: International Journal of Computer Integrated Manufacturing
- Member of the Editorial Board of the journal: International Journal of Sustainable Engineering
- Member of the Editorial Board of the journal: Food and Energy Security, Open Access
- Chair of the International Federation for Information Processing (IFIP) Working Group 5.12 Architectures for Enterprise Integration
- Chair of the IFAC Technical Committee 5.3 Integration and Interoperability of Enterprise Systems (2003-2008): https://tc.ifac-control.org/5/3
- Chair of the Researcher Leader Group Engagement of Universitas 21 (U21) – (2019 – 2022)
- Co-Chair in the Climate Change Global Challenge Group of the Worldwide Universities Network – 2020 – 2022
