= Javier de Lope Francés =

Mexican entrepreneur (born 1979)

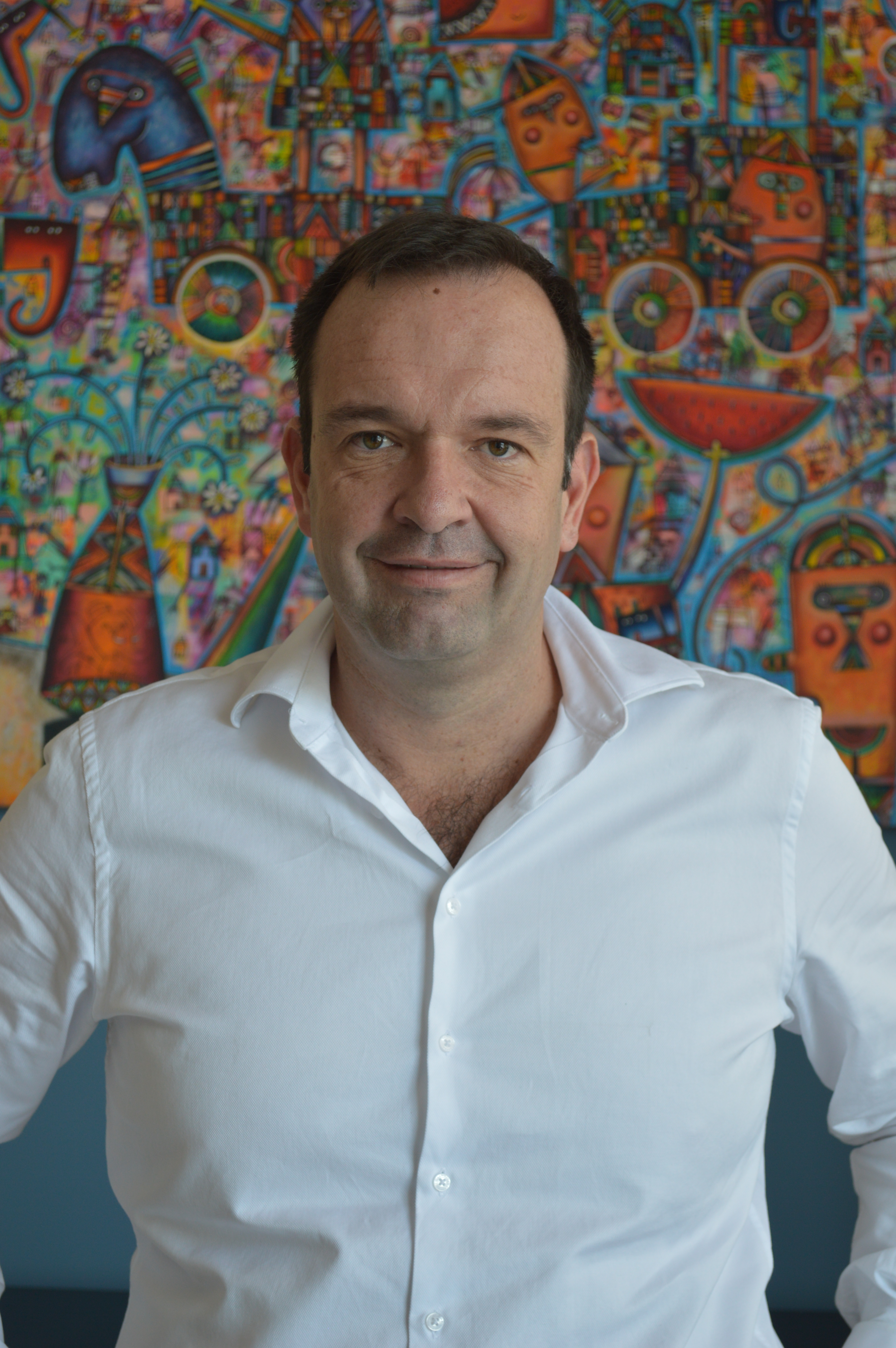
- Born: 1979 (age 46–47); Puebla, Mexico
- Education: Monterrey Institute of Technology and Higher Education, Monterrey Campus
- Occupation: Entrepreneur
- Years active: 1994 to Present
- Known for: Founder of a number of start-ups including CEO of 50 Doctors
- Website: javierdelopefrances.com

Javier de Lope Francés (born 1979) is a Mexican entrepreneur who founded several startups starting in high school. By the end of his college career he had founded 5 businesses, securing one million USD to expand one of them. His career since then has focused on creating new businesses, primarily in real estate and technology in Mexico.

== Life ==
De Lope is a first-generation Mexican, born in 1979 to Spanish immigrant parents. His father managed a plastics plant, directing about sixty employees in Puebla. His mother was a professor at the Universidad de las Americas in Puebla.

De Lope began his 'business' career at an early age. When he was seven, he recycled for newspapers, cardboard and other materials. He frequented a college cafeteria to collect and then sell cards and buttons that were contained inside potato chip bags and resold them at his school. He also worked in neighbors' yards and earned money supervising exams. His parents permitted these activities as long as he maintained a 9.5/10 average in school.

De Lope spent his last year of high school in California with the aim of improving his English, returning to Mexico in 1998.

He attended the Monterrey Institute of Technology and Higher Studies, graduating with a degree in industrial engineering in 2002.

De Lope stated several years ago he wanted to retire at age forty, but he is still creating new businesses.

== Start ups ==
De Lope started his first formal business during his year finishing high school in California at age seventeen. One of his teachers collected Hard Rock Café memorabilia and noticed a Hard Rock México pin on de Lope's jacket, which he did not have. This prompted de Lope to set up an Internet page to sell these pins. The page garnered buyers not only from the United States but also from Europe, Japan and other places, selling about 2,500 pins and earning about US$25,000.

He used this money to set up and open a car inspection center concession when he returned to Puebla in 1998. However, in the following year he had to sell his interest in the business because of college.

As a college student, de Lope decided to start a business. Starting with a few power tools, his original idea was to make rustic furniture, but after a month he decided this was not viable. Instead, he shifted his focus to decorative picture frames, incrusted with dried flowers affixed with resin. To start the business, he asked local carpenters to lend him the wood, promising to pay them as soon as the company started making money. In 1999, he created a business plan to expand the business, entering it in the Venture Challenge 2000 international business plan competition at San Diego State University. He was the seventh student from Monterrey Tech to compete, but the first to place, coming in third. More importantly, he competition put him in touch with directors from Ticketmaster and Price Costco, who pledged one million dollars to expand the business. At this time, de Lope was only twenty. Today, the frames are made by disabled workers. The company is in Puebla and as of 2010 employed about 200 people. Only a small percentage work at the plant, with the rest working at home with company provided materials. He hires the disabled saying that they are good workers, and it has a social benefit. In his fifth semester, de Lope studied abroad in Spain, making contacts to export the frames there. Today, the company exports to fourteen countries in the Americas, Europe and Asia, making about 20,000 frames a week. However, De Lope sold his interest in this company after 20 years.

In 2001, de Lope began Publicidad Universitaria LOFRAM, with only 600 pesos of capital which he used to make business cards. The idea for the business came while he was bored in class and not listening to the professor. This company produces agendas, calendars and other publications which are handed out to students for free. He went to several companies with the idea and with the money they paid him for advertising space, he began producing the articles. By 2010, this company was operating in Puebla, Guadalajara, Guanajuato, Monterrey and Baja California Norte. After 20 years of operation, he closed this business.

By 2002, de Lope was directing two enterprises, and had about 200 people working for him, which still studying engineering. By age thirty he had created five businesses. As of 2010, he was focused on three businesses. Publicidad Estudiantil LOFRAN sold advertising directed towards university students, such as the flyers and free magazines that are seen on various campuses. El Súper Negocio en casa is a networking marketing enterprise dedicated to selling groceries and medicines. Facture Ya is a company that sells software to small and medium-sized businesses to generate electronic receipts needed for tax purposes in Mexico.

== Recent projects ==
Starting in 2000, Puebla began experiencing a rapid expansion in size and population. De Lope went into construction with the development of the Sonata Center, and upscale mall in the south of the city. However, he stated that he found more opportunity in health care. In the 2010s, he began a series of medical center construction projects under the name Torres Médicas (Medical Tower), with Torres Médicas Angelópolics in Puebla and Torres Médicas Veracruz. These centers have hospital facilities, private doctors' offices and general commercial space.

Technology projects began when Mexico's federal tax authority began shifting to verified digital receipts. He set up several businesses that allows customers and businesses to register deductible purchases online. Technology and real estate are combined in several co-working spaces in Puebla and other cities. In 2019, he started a DNA testing service franchise, Código 46. In almost all cases, De Lope's involvement is in the creation of the business. Once it is running, he sells the business to move onto the next project.

For years, he has been invited to speak about his entrepreneurship experiences and predictions for the future in business in Mexico, Latin America and Spain. At these events, topics have ranged from problems with credit for startups, the need to manage money effectively, never giving up and advice for new businesses after the COVID-19 pandemic.

When asked how he could create businesses outside of his professional expertise, De Lope responded that Mexico has capable professionals he can hire for the technical issues, allowing him to focus on the service and market. He is optimistic about Mexico's entrepreneurial potential, but feels that Mexico's legal and banking system holds the country back.

In recent years, De Lope has further diversified in the hospital sector with his most recent project, Fifty Doctors o 50 Doctors. The initiative is expanding to different states and includes advanced emergency care areas, specialized medical units, operating rooms, and consulting offices designed to support both patients and healthcare professionals. With more than 15 medical towers, the project has positioned itself as one of the largest private hospital networks in the country. Each complex is built to integrate high-technology operating rooms, specialized care facilities, and spaces aimed at improving the quality and accessibility of medical services. The expansion strategy of Fifty Doctors also incorporates opportunities for medical specialists and investors, seeking to strengthen Mexico’s healthcare infrastructure and broaden access to high-quality medical attention.

== Recognitions ==
By age 24, de Lope had earned sixteen awards and other recognitions in Mexico and abroad. He was named entrepreneur of the year with the North America Collegiate Entrepreneur Award. He is the first Spanish speaking person to win the Student Entrepreneur 2000 award from the Jefferson Smurfit Center for Entrepreneurial Studies of the Saint Louis University.

In 2002, he published his autobiography “Para Los Negocios No Hay Edad” (In business there is no age), published by Monterrey Tech with a preface by Mexican president Vicente Fox. The book is in its third edition.
