= List of supermarket chains in Mexico =

== National chains ==
- Casa Ley, associate of Safeway Inc.
- Controladora Comercial Mexicana operates:
  - Bodega Comercial Mexicana
  - City Market
  - Fresko
  - MEGA
  - Sumesa
- Costco 50–50 joint venture with Comercial Mexicana
- Grupo Chedraui
- H-E-B Mexico - wholly owned subsidiary of the H.E.Butt Grocery Company, San Antonio, Texas
- Organización Soriana operates:
  - City Club
  - Soriana
  - Soriana Mercado
- Wal-Mart de México operates:
  - Bodega Aurrerá
  - Sam's Club
  - Superama
  - Wal-Mart

== Regional chains ==
- Aladino's (Coahuila, Jalisco, Nuevo León, Querétaro, State of México)
- Alsuper (Chihuahua, Coahuila, Durango, Zacatecas)
- Arteli (Tamaulipas, Veracruz, San Luis Potosí, Hidalgo)
- Calimax (Baja California, Sonora)
- El Asturiano (Querétaro)
- GranD (Tamaulipas)
- La Bodega Herlomex (Baja California)
- La Gran Bodega (Oaxaca, Puebla, Tlaxcala)
- Súper La Violeta (Michoacán)
- Marinero (Durango)
- Nena's (Baja California, Sonora)
- Súper Akí, formerly "Súper San Francisco de Asís" (Yucatán, Quintana Roo)
- S-Mart (Chihuahua, Nuevo León, Tamaulipas)
- Welton (Baja California, Sonora)

== Defunct chains ==
- France Auchan – acquired by Comercial Mexicana
- France Carrefour – acquired by Chedraui and Soriana
- Mexico Aurrerá – acquired by and rebranded to Wal-Mart
- Germany Plus - closed on 20 November 2010, later the stores acquired by Carrefour on 21 November 2010
- Mexico Blanco – acquired by Gigante which at once, acquired by Soriana in 2007
- Mexico Gigante – acquired by Soriana
- Mexico Comercial Mexicana

== Regional defunct chains ==
- Supermercados Santafé , Santafé Express and Farmacias Santafé (Sonora, Sinaloa)- acquired by Super del Norte in Sonora and Mi Bodega Aurrera (format of Bodega Aurrera) in Sinaloa
- MZ (Sinaloa)-acquired by Casa Ley
- Super del Norte, Super del Norte Express, Super del Norte Fresco, Santovalle , Vimark and Superzaso by Corporativo del Norte (Sonora and Sinaloa) replaced by Waldo's in various parts
- Chalita (San Luis Potosí)
- Comercial VH, Farmacias Vh and Super Val (Sonora and Sinaloa)
- List of supermarket chains
