= Plaza Sendero =

Mexican shopping mall chain

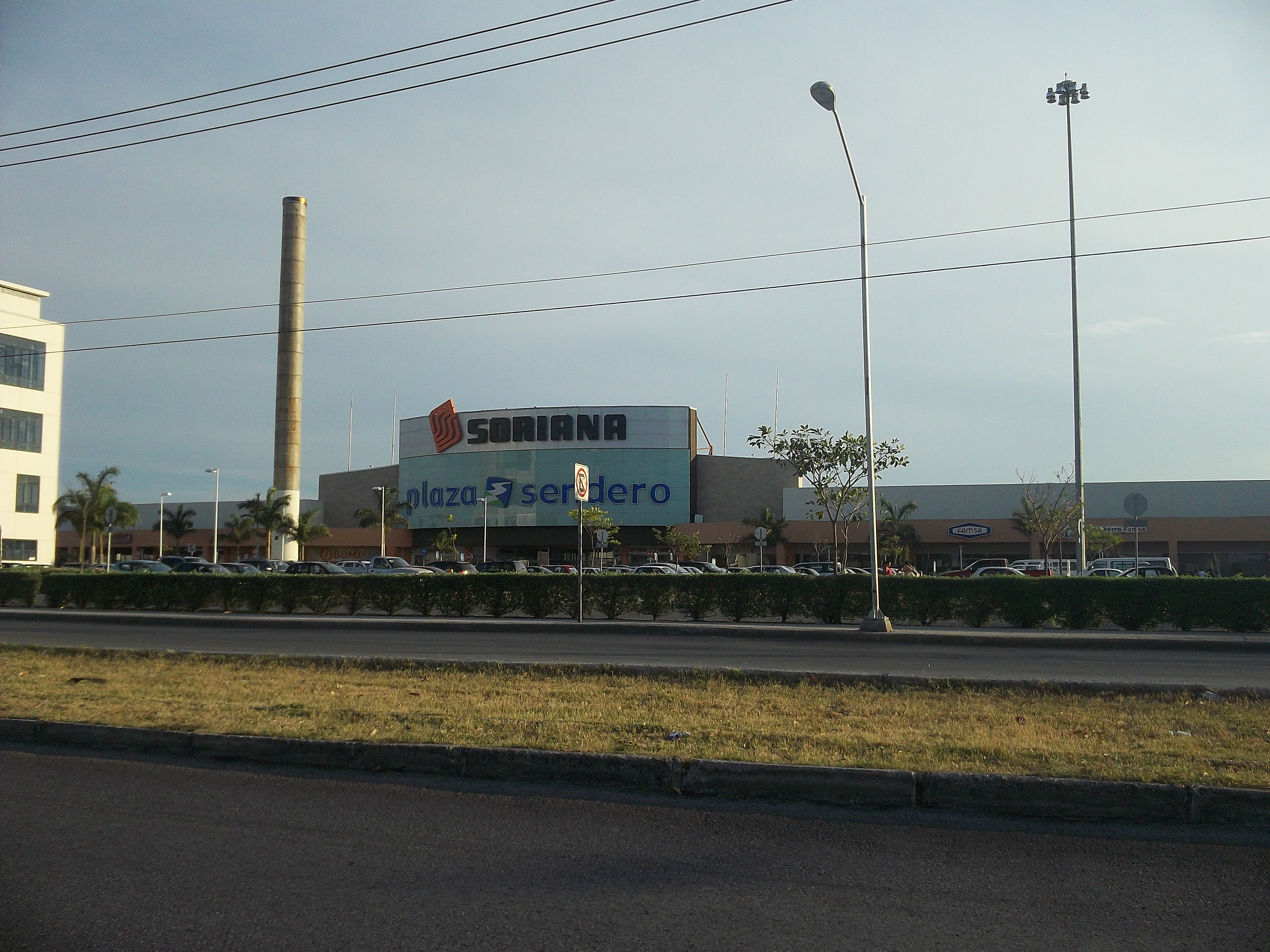

Plaza Sendero is a Mexican Americanized-style chain of shopping malls. The shopping malls usually feature full service restaurants, banks, and clothing stores and movie theaters.

== Sendero properties ==
Sendero properties and major anchors.

- Plaza Sendero - General Escobedo, Nuevo León (Monterrey)
  - Soriana
  - Cinépolis multiplex
  - Catholic chapel
  - Coppel
  - Del Sol
- Plaza Sendero - Apodaca (Monterrey)
  - Soriana
  - Cinépolis
  - Coppel
  - Del Sol
- Plaza Sendero - San Roque (Monterrey)
  - Soriana
  - Cinépolis
  - Coppel
- Plaza Sendero - Ciudad Juárez
  - Soriana
  - Cinépolis
  - Coppel
  - Hágalo
- Plaza Sendero - Las Torres (Ciudad Juárez)
  - Soriana
  - Cinépolis
  - Woolworth
  - Coppel
- Plaza Sendero - Reynosa (179,042 m2)
  - Soriana
  - Cinépolis multiplex
  - Woolworth
  - Coppel
  - GNC
- Plaza Sendero - Hermosillo (152,881 m2)
  - Soriana
  - Cinépolis
  - Coppel
  - Carl's Jr.
  - GNC
  - Burger King
  - Dairy Queen
  - Julio Cepeda Jugeterias
  - Woolworth
- Plaza Sendero - Matamoros (146,394 m2)
  - Soriana
  - Cinépolis multiplex
  - Coppel
  - Carl's Jr.
  - GNC
- Plaza Sendero - Querétaro (128,781 m2)
  - Soriana
  - Cinépolis
  - Coppel
  - Del Sol
- Sendero - Ixtapaluca (180,647 m2)
  - Soriana
  - Cinépolis
  - Coppel
  - Cuidado con el Perro
  - C&A
- Sendero - San Luis Potosí (137,979 m2)
  - Soriana
  - Cinépolis
  - Coppel
  - Woolworth
  - Cuidado con el Perro
- Sendero - Toluca (189,384 m2)
  - Soriana
  - Cinépolis
  - Woolworth
  - Coppel
  - Cuidado con el Perro
- Plaza Sendero - La Fe
  - Soriana
  - Cinépolis
  - Coppel
  - Del Sol
- Plaza Sendero - Chihuahua
  - S-Mart
  - Cinépolis
  - Woolworth
- Plaza Sendero - Los Mochis
  - Casa Ley
  - Cinépolis
  - Suburbia (formerly Fabricas de Francia, 2016-2019)
  - Woolworth
  - Coppel
- Plaza Sendero - Tijuana
  - Casa Ley
  - Cinépolis
  - Suburbia (formerly Fabricas de Francia, 2016-2019)
  - Coppel
  - Woolworth
- Plaza Sendero - Sur Saltillo
  - Merco
  - Cinépolis
  - Suburbia (formerly Fabricas de Francia, 2017-2019)
  - Del Sol
- Plaza Sendero - Ciudad Obregón
  - Casa Ley
  - Cinépolis
  - Coppel
  - Woolworth
- Plaza Sendero - Culiacán
  - Casa Ley
  - Cinépolis
  - Woolworth
  - Coppel
- Plaza Sendero - Mexicali
  - Casa Ley
  - Cinépolis
  - Woolworth
  - Coppel
- Plaza Sendero - Santa Catarina
  - Merco
  - Cinépolis
  - Del Sol
  - Coppel

== Mérida, Yucatán ==
- The former Plaza Sendero in the Chuminópolis section of Mérida, Yucatán was taken over by Gran Patio management, and continues under the name "Patio Mérida".

== Proposed and under construction ==
- Ensenada
