= City Club (wholesale club) =

Mexican wholesale grocery retailer

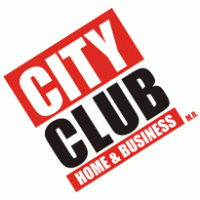
- Industry: Tertiary
- Founded: 2002; 24 years ago
- Headquarters: Torreón, Coahuila de Zaragoza, Mexico
- Number of locations: 40
- Owner: Soriana
- Website: http://www.cityclub.com.mx/

Clubes City Club is the wholesale club of Mexican grocery store Soriana founded in 2002, in this same year it opened the first club in Torreón, Coahuila, Mexico, in Fundadores Square, that also has a Soriana store. As of 2024 it has 40 stores.

== History ==
On 17 July 2002, Tiendas Soriana began to implement its multi-format strategy and with this the price club format was created under the name City Club. Like Tiendas Soriana (its owner), its first branch was opened to the public in the city of Torreón, Coahuila, where the brand would later begin to venture into various cities in the country, such as Monclova, Chihuahua, Saltillo, Colima, Tuxtla Gutiérrez, Cancún, Pachuca and Villahermosa, among others. Likewise, in February 2004, City Club opened its first branch in Monterrey, Nuevo León (San Jerónimo).

In 2008, after the purchase of 199 Gigante stores by Soriana on 6 December 2007, although of those 199 Gigante stores that the original company in Torreón bought, most were converted to Soriana's different formats, 6 of they were converted to City Club, this because they were properties where there was already Soriana nearby or where there were two Gigante branches, one of which had already been converted to Soriana. With this conversion, City Club, in addition to adding branches in Monterrey and in the Conurbated Zone of the Valley of Mexico, reinforced its presence in the center of the country, venturing into new cities such as Puebla and Querétaro, this through the purchase of stores by Soriana.

During the 2010s, City Club expanded throughout the Mexican Republic, including the opening of branches such as Piedras Negras, Coahuila, which was inaugurated to the public on 24 November 2011; San José Viejo in San José del Cabo, Baja California Sur in 2013 and León, Guanajuato in November 2014. Likewise, on 30 June 2016, City Club enters Mexico City with the opening of its first branch to the public in the Parque Vía Vallejo shopping center as one of the anchor stores, within the Azcapotzalco delegation.

However, on 29 February 2020, the only branch in León Guanajuato was closed after just over 5 years of service, the cause of its closure being due to low sales and low profitability, this as a result of low interest and also due to the failed to position itself in the public's taste of the León population with the City Club format, being replaced by Sodimac Homecenter one year later, being so far the first and only City Club to close throughout the Mexican Republic.

After this, the following year, in 2021, its expansion plan in the country resumed with the opening of its branch in the municipality of Guadalupe, Zacatecas, this as a result of the demolition and construction from scratch of the Soriana Súper Gavilanes store (Before Gigante Zacatecas) in September 2020. During 2022 and as part of its 20th anniversary of operations in Mexico, City Club reaches two new cities in the country with the opening of branches in Tapachula, Chiapas (as the anchor store of the Alaïa Tapachula shopping center) and Ciudad Victoria, Tamaulipas, the latter replacing the property of the now defunct MEGA Comercial Mexicana, due to the purchase of Comercial Mexicana by Soriana 6 years earlier. On 28 April 2023, City Club opens its branch in Ciudad del Carmen, Campeche, replacing MEGA Soriana which closed on 9 September 2022, being temporarily closed because of controversy involving water pollution, but was re-opened days later. Likewise, in mid-2023, the arrival of City Club to western Mexico is confirmed, with the opening of its first store in Zapopan, Jalisco, this within the Guadalajara Metropolitan Area, as one of the anchor stores of the shopping center, Plaza Cordilleras (owned by Soriana), which was opened to the public on 15 November 2023. On 18 April 2024, City Club opened its second branch in the city of Torreón, Coahuila in the Parque Viñedos shopping complex (City Club Viñedos), this being branch #40 in the Mexican Republic.

On 4 October 2024, after 10 months of public operation, the City Club Cordilleras branch in the Guadalajara Metropolitan Área, Jalisco, was closed due to a fire

Until 2024, City Club has 40 branches, with presence in 30 cities within 20 states of the Mexican Republic.

== Business model ==
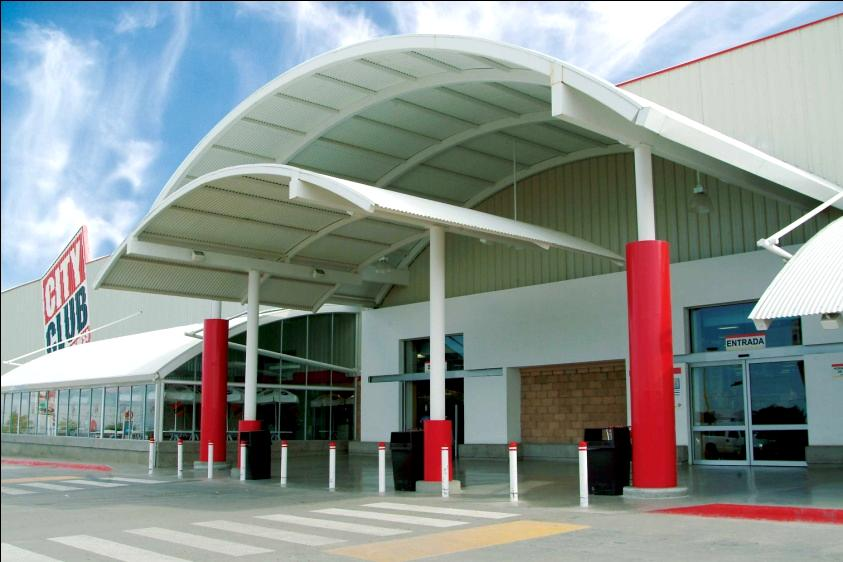
A City Club store

As its commercial name indicates, City Club is a price club with a membership system, which consists of stores that have an area between 7,000 and 11,000 square meters of sales floor to which entry is only possible by paying a membership.

They are focused on both high-volume consumption families and institutional clients, such as hospitals, hotels, restaurants, entrepreneurs and small merchants, among others. They operate under the wholesale and half-wholesale sales scheme, which in most of their departments present the products in large containers and/or multiple packages, which operate with large purchase volumes and low marketing margins. They manage 5,000 SKUs from the grocery, perishables, clothing and general merchandise divisions.

In each of their branches they have departments such as edible and non-edible groceries, cleaning and household items, stationery and office and pets (these always have multi-package presentations in each one), Electronics, Appliances, Perfumery, Watches, Clothing, Footwear, Prepared Foods, Bakery, Pastry, Fruits and Vegetables, Butchery, Rotisserie, Cheese and Delicatessen, as well as other departments and varied services such as Pharmacy; the Wine and Spirits cellar known as CAVA CITY; the soda fountain under the name of Food Station, which is responsible for providing the consumer with dishes such as pizzas, hot dogs, hamburgers, cooked potatoes, chicken wings, chicken bake, and some desserts such as snow cones and frozen milkshakes among others; City Club Optician; technology department with the name of CITY MOVIL and the CENTRO LANTERO, which the latter is present in 23 City Club stores of the 39 currently existing.

In terms of location, this business model is located mainly in cities and towns with more than 150,000 inhabitants, which must strictly have at least one branch of the Soriana Híper format within the same city or town where it would be installed. City Club is usually found in properties and shopping malls where Soriana is present (especially in branches with the formats Soriana Híper in some cases such as Saltillo; Hermosillo; Culiacán; Chihuahua; Lincoln, San Jerónimo and Puerta de Hierro in Monterrey; Coacalco, Ixtapaluca and Parque Vía Vallejo in Mexico City and metropolitan area; Toluca; Colima; Tuxtla Gutiérrez and Tapachula cities, both in Chiapas; Villahermosa; La Paz; San José Viejo, in Los Cabos and Guadalajara, among others, and Soriana Súper in the cases of the stores in Zacatecas and Piedras Negras); They also operate on their own and/or are located in properties independent of Soriana, this is mainly in Gigante and Comercial Mexicana properties where there is already Soriana nearby or in areas where, since there are two Gigante stores, one of them is already converted to some Soriana format. Unlike its main competitors, City Club is a commercial brand with 100% Mexican capital, since it is a direct format of Tiendas Soriana.

In the sector, its main competitors nationwide are:

- Sam's Club from Walmart de México y Centroamérica
- Costco from Costco Wholeasle México (Previously as subsidiary partner of Comercial Mexicana until 14 July 2012)
- Smart & Final from Calimax and Chedraui
- Ley Mayoreo and Súper Mayoreo Ley from Casa Ley (competitor to some extent, due to the wholesale and multi-package sales scheme)

== City Life magazine ==
In February 2004, City Club edited the first copy of its magazine, called City Life. This one contains several information about the store, products and many other temporary available promos of the store.

== Own brands ==
- Member's Choice, similar to Sam's Club's Member's Mark and Costco's Kirkland Signature.
- Kitchen Solutions, similar to Sam's Club's Bakers & Chiefs.
- École, stationery products.
- X-Cargo, back packs.
