= Supermercados Gigante =

Mexican supermarket chain

Gigante, S.A. de C.V.

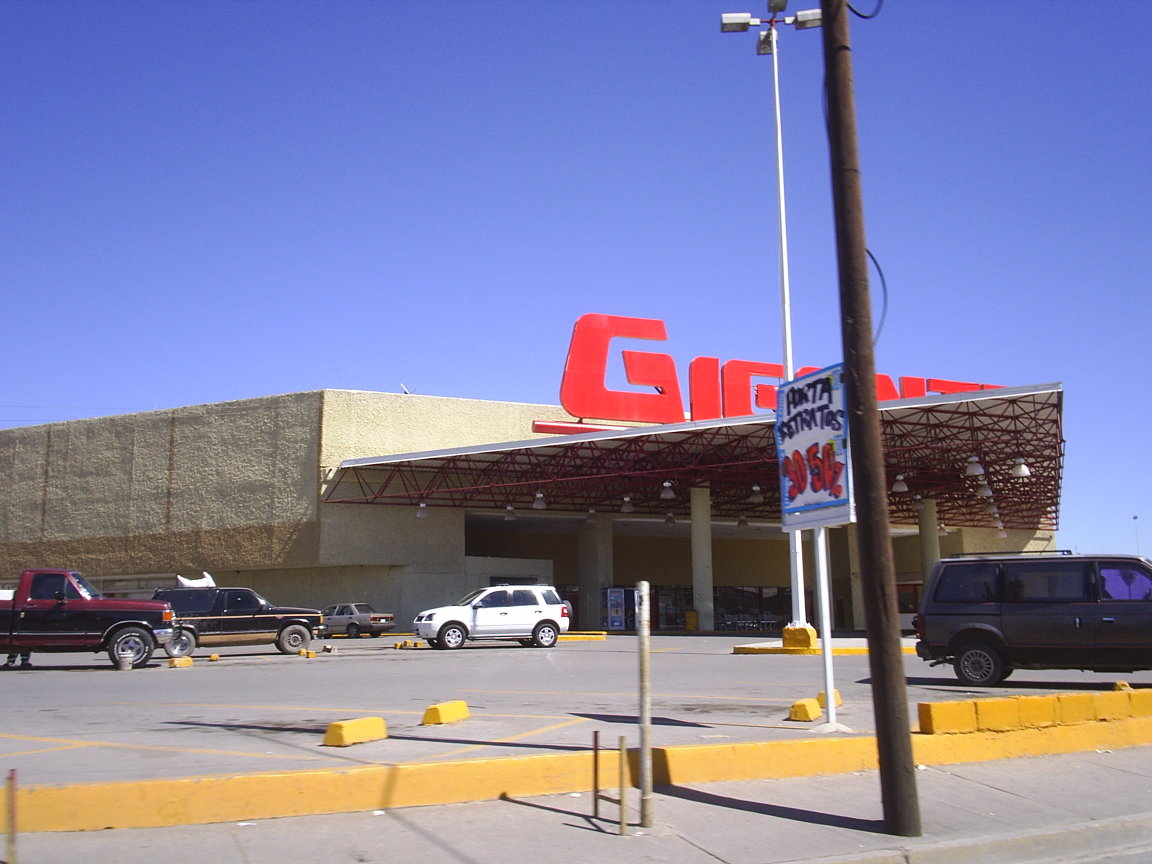
- Type: Subsidiary of Grupo Gigante
- Industry: Retail
- Founded: 1962
- Founder: Angel Lozada Ramirez
- Defunct: 2008
- Fate: Purchased by Organización Soriana
- Headquarters: Mexico City, Mexico
- Number of locations: 199 (2008)
- Area served: Mexico
- Key people: Angel Lozada (CEO, 2008)
- Services: Grocery, bakery, clothing, footwear, home supplies, office supplies, hygiene and personal products, appliances, electronics, music, car supplies, pharmacy, and toys
- Owner: Organización Soriana
- Website: www.gigante.com.mx

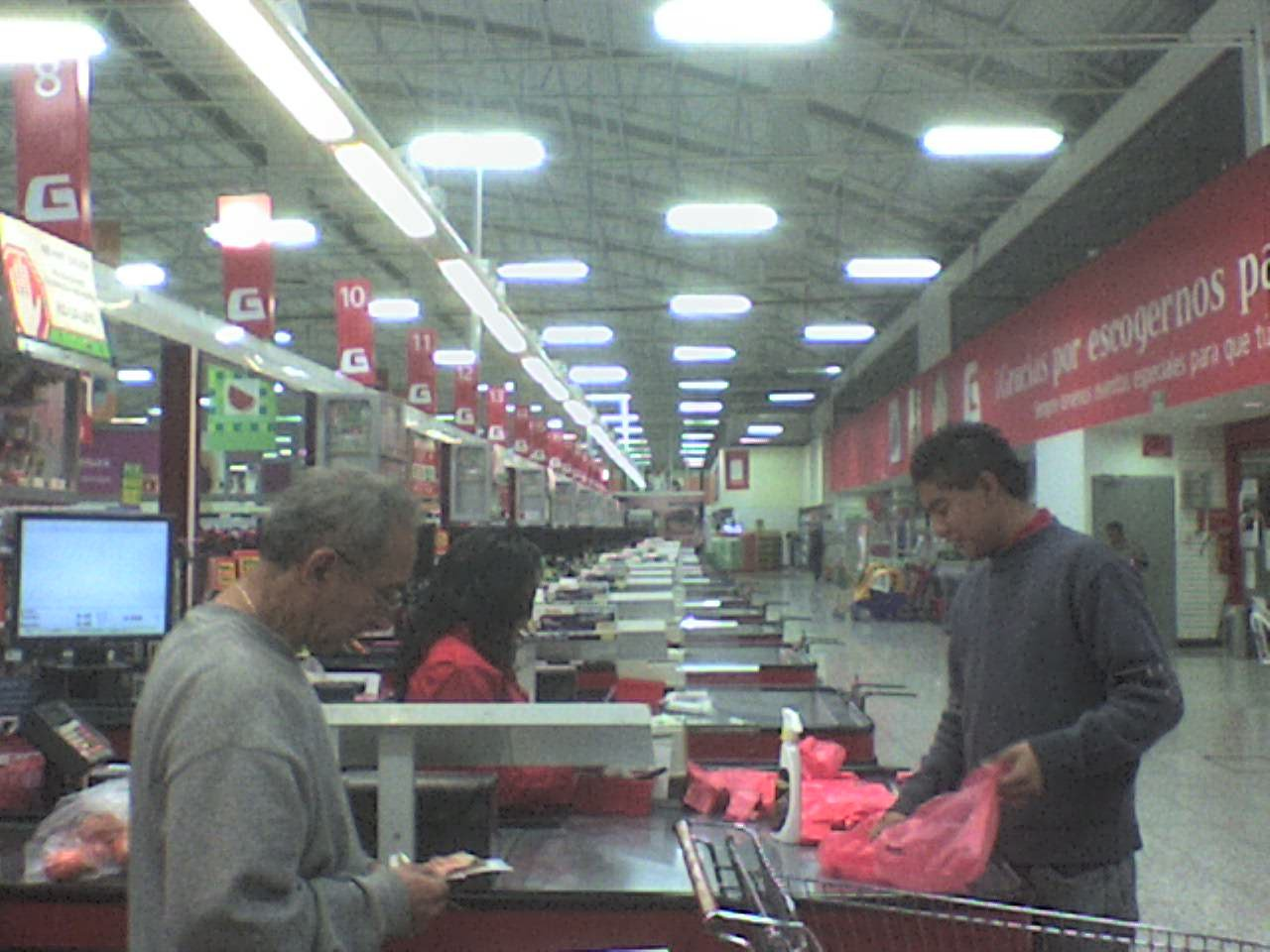

Supermercados Gigante was a large supermarket chain in Mexico. The chain expanded north of the border as well, as it also had locations in predominantly working-class Mexican-American communities of the United States.

The supermarket chain was owned by parent company Grupo Gigante, which also operates the restaurant chain Toks, and US retail chains such as RadioShack and Office Depot in Mexico.

Supermercados Gigante competed with several other chains, such as Soriana, Comercial Mexicana, Chedraui, Wal-Mart, H-E-B, Falabella, Cencosud and D&S. It was not uncommon to see Wal-Mart receipts around the store touting the fact that said items were cheaper at Supermercados Gigante.

== Supermercados Gigante in pop culture ==
The chain appeared on the Ahí Viene Verónica film, and on miscellaneous TV Azteca shows.

== Store closures ==
On February 28, 2006 Gigante closed some stores in Mexico (1 in Torreon, 7 in Monterrey, 1 in Matamoros, 2 in San Luis Potosí and 1 in Puebla).

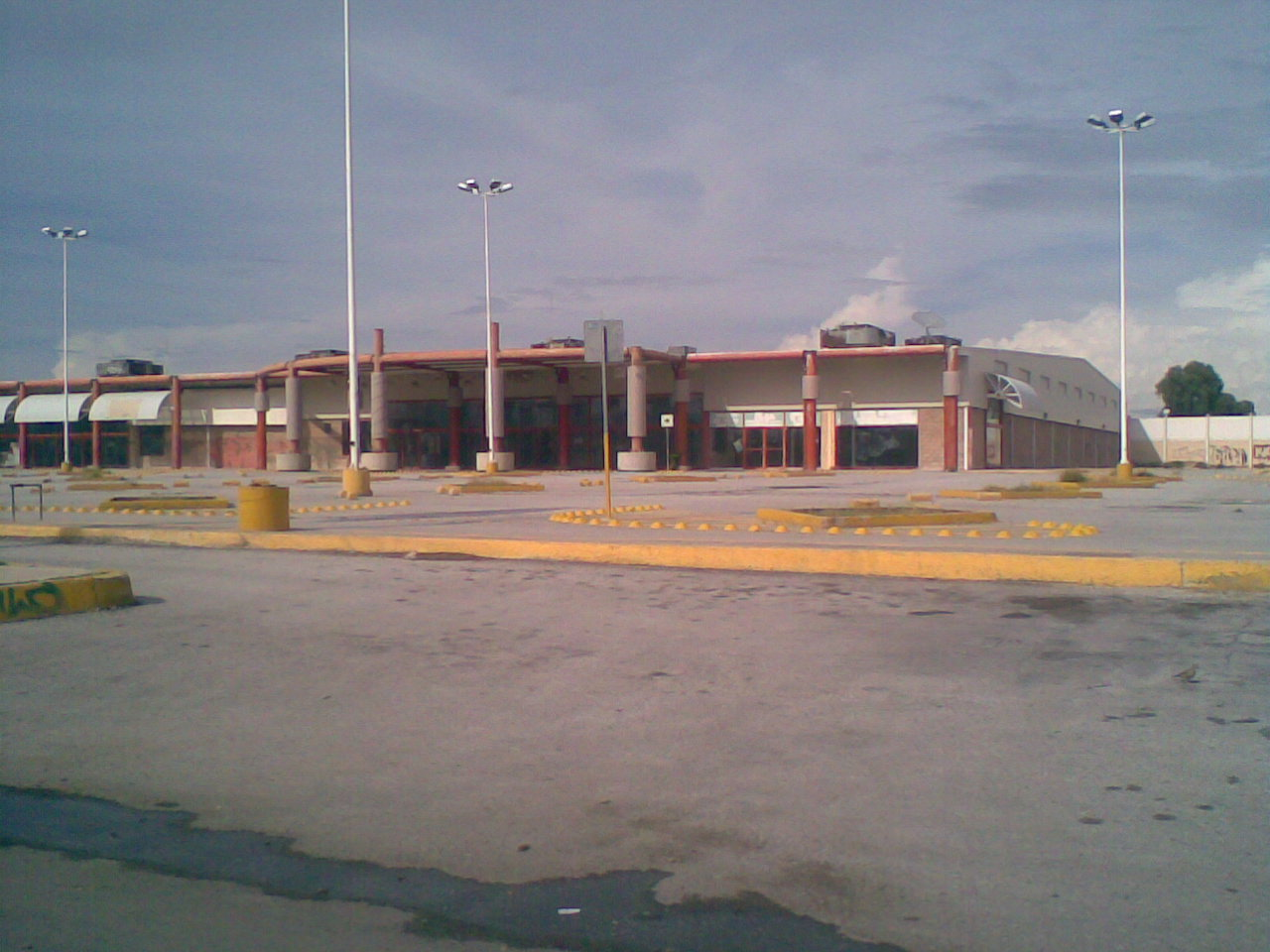
Gómez Palacio, circa 2004

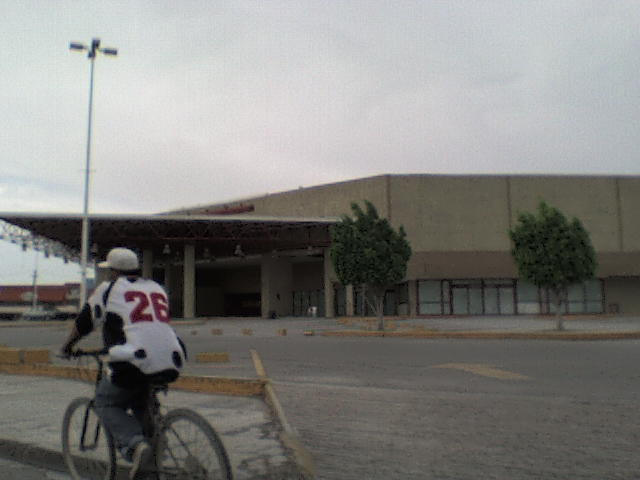
Torreon, circa 2006

== Sale of Gigante ==
As of Dec. 6, 2007 Supermercados Gigante was acquired by Organizacion Soriana for US$1.35 billion. The supermarket and hypermarket retail formats of Supermercados Gigante, including its seven US stores, will disappear and the stores will adopt the Soriana formats. The US stores were acquired by Bodega Latina Corp., the US subsidiary of Grupo Comercial Chedraui, and these stores were converted to Bodega Latina's El Super store banner (Bodega Latina changed its name in 2022 to Chedraui USA). Grupo Gigante will remain in business as a company separate from Soriana, operating the Mexican Radio Shack and Office Depot locations, as well as the Toks restaurant chain.
