= Oasis Coyoacán =

Shopping mall in Mexico City

- Interactive location map of Oasis Coyoacán
- Location: Coyoacán, Mexico City, Mexico
- Coordinates: 19.3455°N 99.1795°W
- Address: Avenida Miguel Ángel de Quevedo 227, Oxtopulco
- Opened: October 13, 2015
- Developer: Grupo MF, with Grupo Eurovi
- Architect: Colonnier Arquitectos
- Num. of stores: c. 150
- Floor area: 45,000 square metres (480,000 sq ft)
- Floors: 2
- Parking: 2300
- Public transit: Miguel Ángel de Quevedo metro station
- Website: oasiscoyacan.com

Oasis Coyoacán is an open-air shopping center on Avenida Miguel Ángel de Quevedo in Coyoacán, Mexico City, at the corner of Avenida Universidad. Its address is Avenida Miguel Ángel de Quevedo 227, Oxtopulco, Coyoacán, 04360. It opened to the public on 13 October 2015. It has about 150 stores. It has 45,000 m^{2} (480,000 sq ft) of floor space and parking for 2,300 cars. The nearest Metro station is Miguel Ángel de Quevedo, on Line 3.

== History ==
Oasis Coyoacán was developed by Grupo MF in association with Grupo Eurovi, and built by MF Ingenieros. The architects were Colonnier Arquitectos. In May 2015 the investment for construction and equipment was put at US$100 million, financed by Banca Mifel.

== Design ==
Taking advantage of Mexico City's mild weather, the center takes the form of an open-air plaza. Its main feature is an artificial lake of almost 3,000 m^{2} (32,000 sq ft) with waterfalls, fountains and reflecting pools.

The project won the Silver Medal in the commerce category at the XIV Bienal Nacional de Arquitectura (14th Architecture Biennial) in 2016. It received an honorable mention in the commerce category at the III Bienal de Arquitectura de la Ciudad de México (3rd Mexico City Architecture Biennial) in November 2017.

== Tenants ==
Early tenants in November 2015 included Zara, Forever 21, Gap, Oysho, Scappino, Aéropostale, Aldo, Levi's, Innovasport, Tous, American Eagle, Old Navy, Banana Republic and Bershka. Sephora later opened a store there. Lacoste opened its third Mexican store, in the Le Club format, in the center; other stores there include Mango, Intimissimi, Sfera, Massimo Dutti, Adolfo Domínguez and Cuidado con el Perro. The center also has a City Market upscale supermarket, and a Cinépolis multicinema, and a PlayCIty Casino. There are also 13 full-service restaurants, a 14-unit food court, 14 other snack vendors and cafés (including 2 Starbucks), a bank, and a children's play area.

== Traffic ==
Since the opening, long queues of vehicles have formed around the center, and neighbors had warned that it would complicate traffic on Miguel Ángel de Quevedo and Avenida Universidad. In November 2015 the city's urban development ministry (Seduvi) said the center had opened without meeting several required mitigation measures, including a feasibility study for a tunnel from Avenida Miguel Ángel de Quevedo to the underground parking. MF Ingenieros, the builder, proposed building a tunnel on Miguel Ángel de Quevedo.

== Incident ==
In January 2025 an irritant gas in the center caused itching and irritation in at least 70 people.
