= Marinero =

Marinero may refer to:

- Marinero, list of supermarket chains in Mexico
- "Marinero" (song), song by Maluma 2018
- "El marinero", song composed by María Luisa Escobar
- "El marinero", song composed by Ricardo Rico from Cha-Cha-Cha Boom!
- El Marinero, ship on which María de las Mercedes Barbudo travelled
- Marineros de Puerto Plata (2005–2009)
