= La Comer =

Mexican hypermarket holding company

La Comer, S.A.B. de C.V.

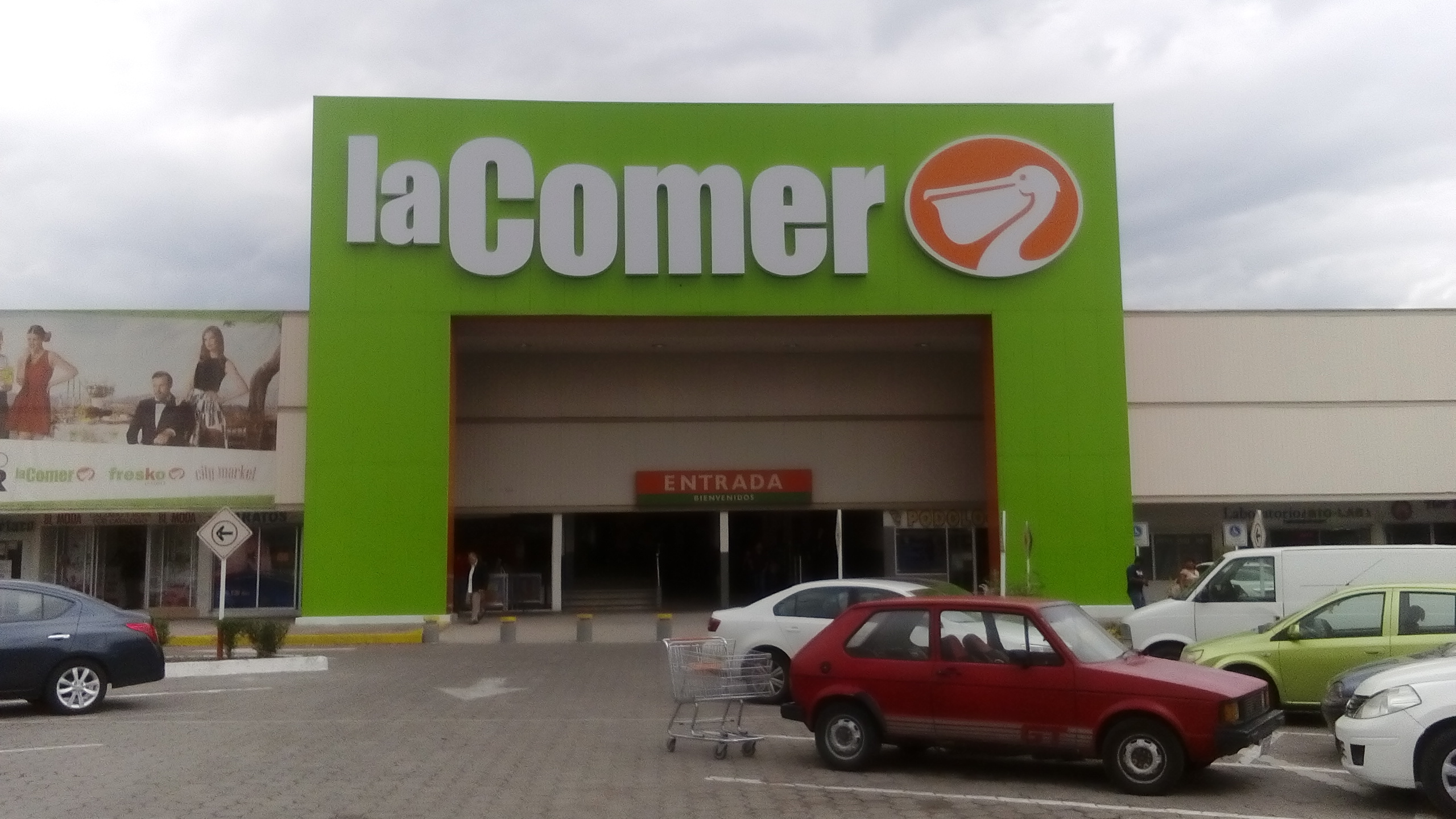
- Type: Sociedad Anónima Bursatil de Capital Variable
- Traded as: BMV: LACOMER
- Industry: Hypermarkets and Super Centers
- Predecessor: Controladora Comercial Mexicana
- Founded: October 4, 2016
- Headquarters: Mexico City, Mexico
- Area served: Mexico
- Key people: Ricardo Martín Bringas (Chairman); Carlos González Zabalegui (CEO)
- Brands: La Comer
- Revenue: ▲ Mex$ 47.9 billion (2014); Mex$ 47.1 billion (2013)
- Net income: ▼ Mex$ 2.2 billion (2014); Mex$ 3.7 billion (2013)
- Total assets: ▲ Mex$ 44.8 billion (2014); Mex$ 44.5 billion (2013)
- Number of employees: 30,000 (2014)
- Subsidiaries: La Comer; Inmobiliarias
- Website: www.lacomer.com.mx

Grupo La Comer (Comercial City Fresko, S. de R.L. de C.V.; subsidiary of La Cómer, S.A.B. de C.V.; doing business as laComer) is a Mexican holding company of hypermarkets headquartered in Mexico City, Mexico. It operates the hypermarkets La Comer, City Market, Fresko and Sumesa, which have a strong presence in Mexico City and Central Mexico.

Founded in 1944 as Controladora Comercial Mexicana, it reported revenues of US$3.6 billion for 2014. Controladora Comercial Mexicana was listed on the Mexican Stock Exchange since 1991 and is a constituent of the IPC, the main benchmark index of Mexican stocks.

In 2016, Controladora Comercial Mexicana was spun off into La Comer after selling the brand to Organización Soriana.

== Formats ==
As of January 4, 2016, the new company "La Comer" was born, successor to the original company founded in 1930, which intends to manage the four profitable formats of the company, identified as City Market, Fresko, Sumesa and the new entity, known as "La Comer". Unlike the previous company, it will not offer massive discounts but exclusively in El Buen Fin and its new concept of season of offers, Temporada Naranja (national publicity campaign, successor of Julio Regalado); In addition, the new store will no longer offer clothing or footwear in its new formats. As announced, the company indicates that it will have 54 units.

=== La Comer ===
In 2016, the La Comer format was created, arising from the purchase of Comercial Mexicana from Soriana, in which the format is the re-founding of the new company through some branches of Comercial Mexicana, MEGA and Bodega Comercial Mexicana retained by Grupo La Comer.

This format is conceptualized on the basis of a hypermarket from 4,000 m^{2} (43,000 sq ft) to 11,000 m^{2} (120,000 sq ft) of sales floor. They are hypermarkets that are focused on consumers located in cities from 100,000 inhabitants onwards, in which they manage divisions of departments such as groceries, perishables, prepared foods, gourmet foods, general merchandise and household items. Unlike its competitors, it does not offer clothing or footwear.

In the hypermarket and megamarket profile, its main competitors are:

- Soriana Híper format and its two sub-formats Soriana Híper Plus and MEGA Soriana (Tiendas Soriana)
- Walmart Supercenter (Walmart)
- Selecto Chedraui (Chedraui)
- H-E-B
- Casa Ley
- Alsuper from Grupo Futurama
- Smart & Final by Calimax.

In 2016, some stores, MEGAS and BODEGA of the former Comercial Mexicana selected by the company were converted to LaComer.

=== Sumesa ===
Controladora Comercial Mexicana had bought the SUMESA supermarkets in 1981; considered the first chain of supermarkets that existed in Mexico, created in 1945. These stores are aimed at the middle and high socioeconomic level, offering groceries and perishables; and they are installed in areas of high population density, many branches lack parking spaces, since their sales floors are 500 m2. to 1,500 m2.

In its supermarket profile, its main competitors are:

- Soriana Súper and its sub-format Soriana Supermarket (Tiendas Soriana)
- Súper Chedraui (Chedraui)
- Walmart Express (formerly Superama) (Walmart)

In 2016, the Al Precio Marte store, owned by the former Controladora Comercial Mexicana, was converted to Sumesa.

=== City Market ===
City Market founded in 2006 is a Gourmet Supermarket (2800 m^{2} of sales floor), aimed at a type of consumer with a high socioeconomic level; where there is a great variety of exclusive items in a specialized gourmet store, such as cheeses, jams, wines, liqueurs and exotic spices. They have a Cafeteria, Gelateria, Pintxos and Bar do Mar area. With this format, it is intended to make direct competition against Liverpool and El Palacio de Hierro as well as to be part of shopping centers where one of these two department stores are present as anchors. However, and as a luxury premium supermarket, its main competitors are:

- Selecto Chedraui and Selecto Super Chedraui (Chedraui) (Main competitor)
- Aladinno's

In 2011, the Sumesa Polanco store was converted to City Market.

=== Fresko ===
In 2009, Fresko was created; focused on grocery, perishables and, to a limited extent, general merchandise items. They are supermarkets whose sales floor ranges from 1,000 to 4,500 square meters, in which they were created with the aim of providing agile and fast purchases. Cities are chosen where the vertical growth they experience takes place. In its profile of a premium fresh market supermarket, its main competitors are:

- Super Chedraui and Select Super Chedraui (Chedraui)
- Soriana Super Plus (Soriana Stores)
- Super Ley Express Fresh (Casa Ley)
- Until 2020, it was primarily competing against Superama (Walmart) at the national level. However, due to the change of format to Walmart Express, now Sumesa competes against the aforementioned new format of Walmart.

In 2016, four Comercial Mexicana stores were converted to Fresko.
