= H-E-B Mexico =

American owned Mexican supermarket chain

Supermercados Internacionales HEB, S.A. de C.V.
- Type: Subsidiary
- Industry: Grocery retail
- Founded: 1997; 29 years ago
- Headquarters: Monterrey, Nuevo León, Mexico
- Area served: Northeast and Central Mexico
- Key people: Fernando Martinez (chairman and CEO); Charles Butt (president and CEO of American parent company H-E-B)
- Products: Bakery, dairy, deli, frozen foods, gasoline, general grocery, meat, pharmacy, produce, seafood, snacks
- Parent: H-E-B
- Website: www.heb.com.mx

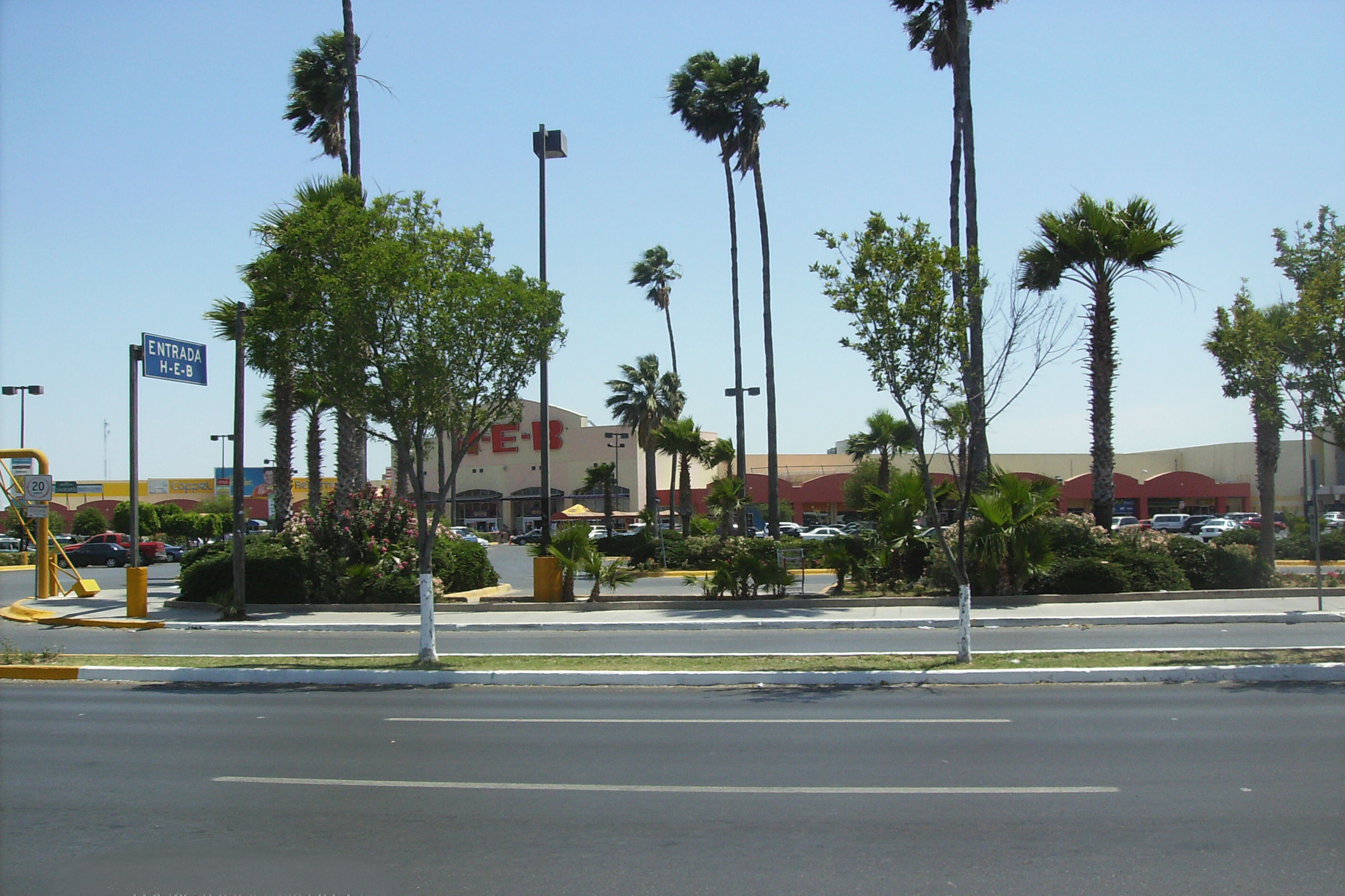
Store in Nuevo Laredo

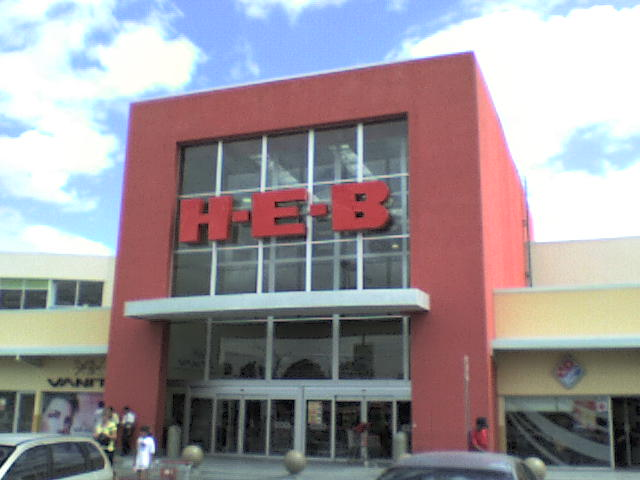
Store in Torreón

Supermercados Internacionales HEB, S.A. de C.V. is the Mexican division of H-E-B, a private supermarket chain based in San Antonio, Texas, U.S. It competes mainly with Soriana, Walmart México, Bodega Aurrerá, S-Mart, Chedraui and Casa Ley.

In 1997, H-E-B opened the first store in Monterrey. By the end of 1999, the company was operating six stores in Mexico—five in Monterrey and one in Saltillo, one of the stores operated under the name EconoMax, and was similar to the H-E-B Pantry stores. H-E-B caters to local customers by offering mostly Mexican-made products.

Supermercados Internacionales HEB also operates a discount store called Mi Tienda del Ahorro to compete directly with Bodega Aurrerá. These stores are positioned to target low and middle income customers in areas where an HEB location may not be able to be located. The locations run by the US division, simply titled Mi Tienda, operate more as Latino-focused specialty stores.

== Current stores ==
- Nuevo León (46): Mi Tienda Monterrey Eloy Cavazos (2917), Mi Tienda Zuazua (2920), Mi Tienda García (2921), Mi Tienda Cabezada (2923), H-E-B Tec (2924), Mi Tienda Plaza del Bosque (2925), H-E-B Puerta de Hierro (2926), H-E-B La Puerta (2929), Mi Tienda Metroplex (2932), H-E-B Las Puentes (2935), Mi Tienda Valle de Santa María (2939), H-E-B Cerradas de Anáhuac (2943), Mi Tienda Margaritas (2944), H-E-B Bosques de las Lomas (2945), H-E-B El Uro (2946), H-E-B Chipinque (2950), H-E-B Contry (2951), H-E-B San Nicolás (2952), H-E-B Los Morales (2953), Mi Tienda Aztlán (2956), H-E-B Chapultepec (2957), H-E-B Lincoln (2958), H-E-B Gonzalitos (2959), H-E-B Lindavista (2961), H-E-B Santa Catarina (2963), H-E-B Solidaridad (2965), Mi Tienda San Roque (2966), H-E-B Guadalupe Juárez (2967), H-E-B Escobedo (2974), H-E-B San Pedro (2975), H-E-B Acapulco (2976), H-E-B Guadalupe Livas (2977), H-E-B Cumbres (2978), H-E-B Sendero (2979), H-E-B Concordia (2980), H-E-B Valle Alto (2981), Mi Tienda Ciudadela (2990), H-E-B Valle (2992), Mi Tienda Huinalá (2994), H-E-B Valle Oriente (2996), Mi Tienda Buena Vista (9104), H-E-B Diego Díaz (9106), H-E-B Rinconada (9108), Mi Tienda Lincoln (9110), Mi Tienda Anzures (9113), H-E-B La Fe (9117).
- Tamaulipas (17): Mi Tienda Matamoros Brisas (2906), Mi Tienda Nuevo Laredo Reforma (2911), H-E-B Victoria Campestre (2928), H-E-B Lauro Villar (2930), Mi Tienda Reynosa Bugambilias (2931), H-E-B Madero (2936), Mi Tienda Nuevo Laredo Revolución (2948), H-E-B Reynosa Morelos (2960), H-E-B Matamoros (2962), H-E-B Tampico Ejército (2964), H-E-B Nuevo Laredo (2968), Mi Tienda Reynosa Periférico (2969), Mi Tienda Río Bravo (2972), H-E-B Tampico Hidalgo (2973), H-E-B Reynosa Las Fuentes (2987), Mi Tienda Reynosa Aeropuerto (2995), Mi Tienda Reynosa San Fernando (9107).
- Coahuila (11): H-E-B Monclova Pape (2927), H-E-B Torreón Revolución (2933), H-E-B Torreón Senderos (2934), Mi Tienda Saltillo Satélite (2938), H-E-B Saltillo República (2954), H-E-B Torreón Independencia (2970), H-E-B Piedras Negras (2971), H-E-B Saltillo La Nogalera (2989), Mi Tienda Saltillo Fundadores (2991), H-E-B Saltillo San Patricio (2993), Mi Tienda Saltillo Colosio (9115).
- San Luis Potosí (4): H-E-B San Luis Potosí Lomas (2912), H-E-B Carretera 57 (2922), H-E-B San Luis Potosí Los Pinos (2940), H-E-B San Luis Potosí (2986).
- Guanajuato (4): H-E-B León Torres Landa (2907), H-E-B Irapuato (2918), H-E-B León Cerro Gordo (2937), H-E-B León López Mateos (2984).
- Aguascalientes (2): H-E-B Aguascalientes Santa Mónica (2913), H-E-B Aguascalientes (2985).
- Querétaro (6): H-E-B El Mirador (2915), H-E-B Zibatá (2919), H-E-B Juriquilla (2982), H-E-B El Refugio (2997), H-E-B Bernardo Quintana (9100), H-E-B San Juan del Río (9105).

=== Future cities ===
- Gomez Palacio, Durango
- Ciudad Acuna, Coahuila.

== See also ==
- Comercial Mexicana − Defunct in 2018, also known today as Fresko
- H-E-B − parent company based in Texas, United States
- Soriana
- Walmex
