= Carlos González Nova =

Mexican businessman

Carlos González Nova (14 August 1917 – 19 August 2009) was a Mexican businessman who co-founded the Comercial Mexicana supermarket chain in 1930. Comercial Mexicana is the third largest supermarket chain in Mexico as of 2009.

In 2000, González Nova was in charge of a powerboat that killed UK singer Kirsty MacColl in a restricted beach diving area on Cozumel, Mexico. MacColl was struck saving her son from the speeding boat. It was widely reported that the boathand José Cen Yam, who took the blame for the death, was paid to do so by González Nova.

== Early life ==
Carlos González Nova was born on August 14, 1917, in México City. He was the second child of parents, Josefina Nova and Antonino González Abascal. He moved to Mexico with his family from Santander, Spain, when he was approximately 10 years old.

== Career ==
González Nova co-founded Comercial Mexicana, which was originally called La Comer, with his father, Antonino González Abascal, as a textile-products store in Mexico City in 1930.

He served as the chairman of the company's board of directors until 1998. Gonzalez Nova remained the honorary chairman of the Comercial Mexicana chain until his death in 2009.

== Kirsty MacColl's death ==
On 18 December 2000, English singer-songwriter Kirsty MacColl was killed when struck by a boat which was illegally within a designated diving area. The powerboat involved in the accident was owned by González Nova and Guillermo González Nova, Carlos' brother. One of his employees, boathand José Cen Yam, stated that he was in control of the boat at the time of the incident. Eyewitnesses said that Cen Yam was not at the controls and that the boat was travelling much faster than the speed of one knot that González Nova said.

Cen Yam was found guilty of culpable homicide. People who said they spoke to Cen Yam after the accident said he received money for taking the blame.

== Death ==
González Nova died on August 19, 2009, at the age of 92. His son, Carlos González Zabalegui, continues to serve as the executive chairman and CEO of the company as of August 2009.
