= Juan Manuel Ley =

Mexican businessman (1933–2016)

Juan Manuel Ley Lopez
- Born: February 17, 1933
- Died: January 22, 2016 (aged 82)
- Occupations: Chairman of Casa Ley; President of Saraperos de Saltillo and Tomateros de Culiacán

Juan Manuel Ley López (February 17, 1933 – January 22, 2016) was a Mexican businessman, and the Casa Ley chairman. He was also president of the baseball teams Saraperos de Saltillo in the Mexican Summer League and Tomateros de Culiacán in the Mexican Winter League.

In 1910, Ley's father, Lee Fong, left Guangdong province, China, by boat. When he arrived in Sinaloa city, he "Mexicanized" his name to Juan Ley Fong instead. Ley himself was born and raised in Mexico. The eldest of eight brothers and sisters, Juan Manuel was the CEO of Culiacán Sinaloa Mexico's Based Grupo Ley until his death, which comprises several companies going from Casa Ley SA de CV, one of Mexico's largest retail supermarkets (co-owned by California-based Safeway Inc.), Apparel Stores, Baseball Teams in both Mexican Leagues (Saraperos de Saltillo and Tomateros de Culiacán), Automobile Dealerships, and Del Campo y Asociados, one of the largest producers of fresh tomatoes for export into the United States.

He was born on February 17, 1933, in Tayoltita, Durango, Mexico, and died on January 22, 2016, at 82 years in Culiacan, Sinaloa, Mexico. He was elected for the Mexican Professional Baseball Hall of Fame in 2006.
