= Chedraui =

Mexican supermarket company

Grupo Comercial Chedraui, S.A.B. de C.V.
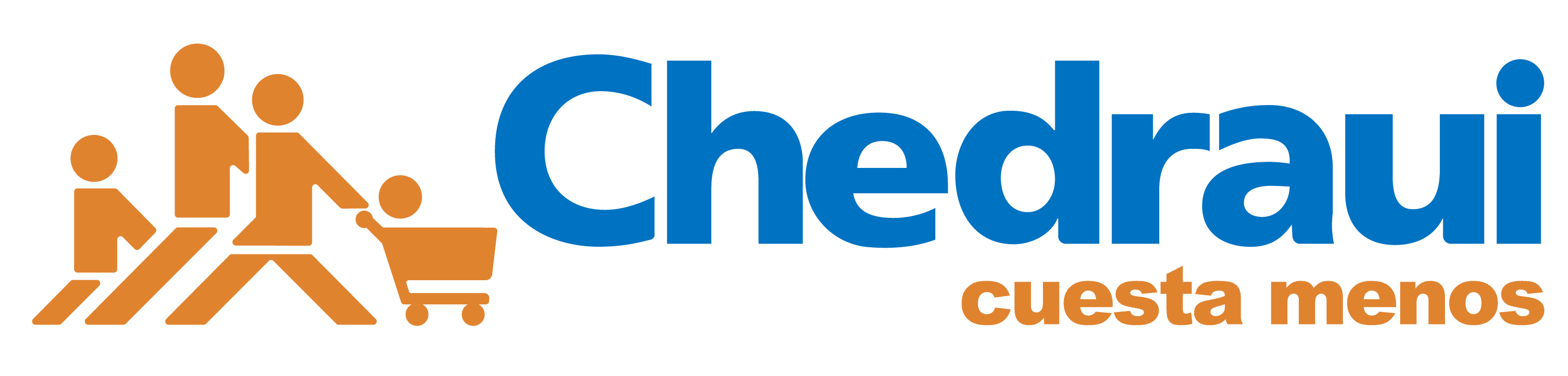
- Logo used by the Mexican supermarket since 2022.

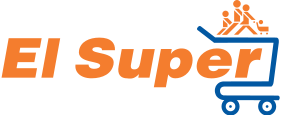
- Logo used by El Super, the main American counterpart of Chedraui.
- Formerly: Grupo Comercial Chedraui, S.A. de C.V. (1987–2010)
- Type: Sociedad Anónima Bursátil de Capital Variable
- Traded as: BMV: CHDRAUI
- Industry: Retail
- Founded: 1927; 99 years ago in Xalapa, Mexico
- Founder: Lázaro Chedraui Chaya
- Headquarters: Xalapa, Mexico
- Area served: Central and Southern Mexico (primarily) with few stores at Northern Mexico; California, Nevada, New Mexico, West Texas and Arizona (Mexico)
- Key people: Antonio Chedraui Obeso, (Chairman); Antonio Chedraui Eguia, (CEO)
- Revenue: ▲US$ 4.7 billion (2016)
- Number of employees: 38,000
- Website: www.chedraui.com.mx (Chedraui) elsupermarkets.com (El Super)

Chain in Isla Mujeres

Chedraui (Chedraui Group) is a publicly traded Mexican grocery store and department store chain which also operates stores in the U.S. in the states of California, Arizona, New Mexico, Texas, and Nevada under the banner name El Super and stores in Texas under the banner name Fiesta Mart. It is traded on the Mexican Stock Exchange under the symbol CHEDRAUI.

== History ==
Chedraui was founded in 1927 in Xalapa, Veracruz, by Lebanese immigrant Lázaro Chedraui Chaya and his wife Ana Caram. They founded towards 1920 a haberdashery in the city of Xalapa, Veracruz. Originally the business was called the Port of Beirut, clearly showing its origin, but for 1927 would adopt the name House Chedraui: the Only One to Trust. In 1971 it opened the first supermarket in Xalapa, Veracruz. In 2005 it bought 29 supermarkets from Carrefour in Central and Southern Mexico. Chedraui's primary competition includes large grocers and hypermarkets such as Soriana, Walmart and Comercial Mexicana.

According to Hoover's, it is "Mexico's third-largest retailer (after Walmart and Soriana), the supermarket giant sells groceries, apparel, and non-perishable items in 262 stores."

The California operations began in 1997, later expanded to Nevada, Arizona, New Mexico and Texas. The stores there are branded El Super, and operated by Grupo Chedraui's Bodega Latina Corporation, headquartered in Paramount, CA until in around 2023 or 2024. The headquarters has since been closed, and moved to Smart & Final headquarters in the city of Commerce. In 2018, Bodega Latina also acquired Fiesta Mart in Texas.

In 2022, Bodega Latina acquired the 250-store Smart and Final banner stores from Apollo Global Management. Following the acquisition, Bodega Latina changed its corporate name to Chedraui USA. Additionally, Smart&Final del Noroeste was created through a joint venture between S&F Mexico and Grupo Calimax. Smart & Final operates on a non-membership basis, allowing customers to shop without the need for a membership.

== Store Formats ==
=== Traditional Formats (México) ===
==== Grupo Comercial Chedraui ====
- Chedraui:

Flagship format of the chain, whose business model consists of a mix between a hypermarket and a self-service warehouse, with an area of between 4,000 and 11,000 sq m of sales floor, which has a wide assortment of groceries, perishable foods, general merchandise and clothing, operating with a retail sales scheme. This store format is aimed at cities and/or metropolitan areas that have at least 50,000 inhabitants.

Its main competitors in the sector are:

- Walmart and Bodega Aurrerá, by Walmart de Mexico y Centroamérica
- Soriana Híper and Soriana Mercado, from Soriana
- La Comer, by Grupo La Comer
- H-E-B
- Alsúper Plus, by Grupo Futurama
- Casa Ley
- S-Mart

In 2005, after the withdrawal of Carrefour from the Mexican market and their subsequent stores sale, all their stores located in the center, western, southern and southeastern regions of Mexico were converted to Chedraui, with the exception of the Monterrey store which was transferred to Walmart due to Chedraui's reluctance and refusal to invest in the Metropolitan area of Monterrey, despite having a distribution center north of it, while the stores located in the states of Coahuila, Chihuahua and Sonora were purchased by Soriana, which converted them to Soriana Híper.

- Super Chedraui:

Supermarket format which has an area of between 1,000 and 2,500 sq m of sales floor. They sell an optimized assortment of groceries, perishable foods, general merchandise and clothing, which are products with the highest turnover in hypermarkets. This format is aimed at cities with between 10,000 and 50,000 inhabitants as well as in areas where it's not possible to locate a traditional-sized Chedraui store.

Its main competitors in the sector are:

- Walmart Express and Mi Bodega Aurrerá, by Walmart de Mexico y Centroamérica
- Soriana Súper and Soriana Express, from Soriana
- Sumesa, by Grupo La Comer
- Al Súper, by Grupo Futurama
- Súper Ley and Súper Ley Express, by Casa Ley
- Super Che:

Warehouse format with a sales floor area of between 2,000 and 2,500 sq m, which offers basic necessities, such as groceries, perishable foods and general merchandise, which, due to the sales floor space, are also products with the highest rotation in hypermarkets. This format is usually located in cities with between 10,000 and 50,000 inhabitants as well as in areas where it's not possible to locate a traditional-sized Chedraui store. Its main competitors in the sector are:

- Bodega Aurrerá and Mi Bodega Aurrerá, by Walmart de Mexico y Centroamérica
- Soriana Mercado and Soriana Express, from Soriana
- Mi Tienda del Ahorro, from H-E-B
- Súper Ley Express and Ley Express, by Casa Ley
- Supercito:

Convenience self-service format with a sales floor area of between 100 and 500 square meters that is aimed to provide agile and fast purchases to the consumer through a mini-supermarket scheme in the neighborhood where the stores are located. It handles a moderate assortment of groceries, perishables and household items. They are commonly located in large and medium-sized cities, which have areas of high population density, such as popular neighborhoods. They are also located in smaller commercial plazas (express plazas). Its main competitors in the sector are:

- Bodega Aurrerá Express, by Walmart de Mexico y Centroamérica
- Soriana Express and Súper City, from Soriana
- Oxxo, by Grupo FEMSA (competitor to some extent, due to selling grocery and convenience)
- 7-Eleven, by Casa Chapa (competitor to some extent, due to selling grocery and convenience)
- Tiendas Neto, by Grupo Salinas (competitor to some extent, due to selling grocery and convenience)
- Farmacias Guadalajara (competitor to some extent, due to selling grocery and convenience)
  - Ley Express, by Casa Ley
- Almacenes Chedraui:

First store created by the group that is still preserved today, located in the municipality of Xalapa, Veracruz (its headquarters city). Their marketing was initially based on fabrics and clothing, now in actuality they also handle products from their other formats.

=== Premium Formats (México) ===
==== Grupo Comercial Chedraui ====
- Selecto Chedraui:

They are the chain's premium hypermarkets located in high-income areas with high-net-worth customers. This format is responsible for offering, in addition to what Chedraui regularly offers, high-value products such as wines and liquors, gourmet breads and pastries, exotic meats and gourmet foods, in addition to having restaurants and food stalls that offer the consumer dishes both national as well as international. Unlike Chedraui's traditional format, this store concept is aimed at cities with more than 300,000 inhabitants, which have areas with high-income populations. In the premium hypermarket sector its main competitors nationwide are:

- La Comer, by La Comer
- Soriana Híper Plus, by Soriana
- H-E-B Market Prime, by H-E-B Mexico
- Selecto Super Chedraui:

They are premium supermarkets of the chain located in areas with medium and high incomes, which have clients with high purchasing power. This format is responsible for offering, in addition to what the Super Chedraui format offers, high-value products such as wines and liquors, gourmet breads and cakes, exotic meats and gourmet foods, in addition to having restaurants and food stalls that offer consumers both national and international dishes. Unlike the Super Chedraui format, this store concept is aimed at cities with more than 300,000 inhabitants, which have areas with a medium and high-income population. In the premium supermarket sector its main competitors nationwide are:

- Fresko La Comer and City Market, by La Comer
- Some Soriana Súper stores located in wealthy areas, called Soriana Súper Plus, from Soriana
- Fresh Market by Al Súper, from Grupo Futurama
- Súper Ley Express Fresh and Fresh Market Ley, from Casa Ley
- Selecto Supercito:

They are the premium convenience stores of the chain located in areas with medium and high incomes, which have clients with high purchasing power. This store format is a fusion between the Supercito format with the Selecto brand, which offers consumers groceries, perishables, gourmet bakery and pastries, exotic meats, high-value wines and liquors and gourmet products, among others, in addition to have a cafeteria. This store concept is aimed mainly at cities where the vertical growth they experience is taking place. In the premium convenience store profile, its main competitors are:

- Sumesa, Fresko and City Market, from La Comer (partially)
- Some Soriana Super located in wealthy areas of Soriana
- Fresh Market by Al Súper, from Grupo Futurama (partially)
- Fresh Market Ley, from Casa Ley (partially)

=== Acquired Formats (México) ===
==== Smart & Final ====
Smart & Final México: In 2021, Chedraui acquired the Smart & Final wholesale stores from Bodega Latina, which in Mexico are currently operated under a joint venture with Calimax, which currently have a presence in the States of Baja California (Mexicali, Tijuana, Ensenada, Rosarito and Tecate) and Sonora (San Luis Río Colorado). Its store concept is wholesale price clubs with an area of between 1,000 and 2,000 sq m of sales floor which handle products with a wholesale and half-wholesale sales scheme, such as groceries, perishables and frozen foods, which are presented through multi-packaging or in large capacities. Unlike its competitors in Mexico, this concept does not require membership upon entry and/or at the time of purchase. As a price club, its competitors at the national level are:

- Sam's Club from Walmart
- Costco Wholesale (Until July 14, 2012, it was a subsidiary partner of Comercial Mexicana, currently Grupo La Comer)
- City Club from Soriana
- Ley Mayoreo and Súper Mayoreo Ley from Casa Ley (competitor to a certain extent, due to the wholesale and half-wholesale sales scheme they handle)

==== Arteli ====
This chain of self-service stores of origin in Tamaulipas was originally founded on November 15, 1978 by businessman Arturo Elizondo in Tampico, Tamaulipas (its first store is Arteli Hidalgo in Tampico). It was announced on December 14, 2022 that Grupo Comercial Chedraui acquired the 36 Arteli stores located in the states of Tamaulipas, Veracruz, San Luis Potosí and Hidalgo plus a CEDIS located in Tampico (its headquarters city) and a bread, tortilla and meat processing plant.

- Arteli:

This store concept has a sales floor area of 2,500 to 4,000 sq m, whose supermarket format handles departments such as groceries, bakery, pastries, tortillas, fruits and vegetables, delicatessen, cheeses, meats, fish and seafood, prepared food, salad bar and wines and spirits. In the supermarket sector, Arteli competes mainly with similar formats, such as:

- Soriana Híper from Soriana
- Walmart Express from Walmart
- Fresko from La Comer
- S-Mart
- Alsuper and Fresh Market Alsúper from Grupo Futurama
- Súper Ley, Fresh Market Ley, Súper Ley Express and Súper Ley Express Fresh from Casa Ley

Before its integration, it also competed with Súper Chedraui and Selecto Súper Chedraui.

- Arteli Más:

Concept that provides, in addition to what its main format offers, departments and services such as pharmacy, appliances, electronics, seasonal items, minor goods and household items among others, in addition to managing a wide assortment of groceries, perishables and prepared food with a sales area of between 2,500 and 5,000 sq m. In the supermarket plus sector, Arteli Más competes mainly with similar formats, such as:

- Soriana Híper from Soriana
- Walmart from Walmart de México y Centroamérica
- La Comer and Fresko from La Comer
- H-E-B
- Al Súper Plus from Grupo Futurama
- Ley from Casa Ley

Before its integration, it also competed with Chedraui and Selecto Chedraui.

- Arteli Express:

Format conceptualized as a convenience store with a sales floor area of between 300 and 1,000 sq m, which are usually located in areas of high population density. Basically it is a mini-super focused on basic consumption, which is why it manages a very moderate assortment of edible and non-edible groceries, meat, fruits and vegetables, dairy and frozen foods, cold drinks, pet food, cleaning supplies, and household items, and in some stores, beers, wines and spirits. In the convenience store sector, Arteli Express competes mainly with similar formats, such as:

- Soriana Express and Súper City from Soriana
- Mi Bodega Aurrerá and Bodega Aurrerá Express from Walmart
- Oxxo from Grupo FEMSA
- 7-Eleven from Casa Chapa
- Circle-K and Tiendas Extra from Grupo Modelo
- Ley Express from Casa Ley

Before its integration, it competed with Supercito.

- AKÁ Súperbodega:

Format available under the concept of self-service warehouse type with a sales area of 1,000 to 2,000 sq m, aimed at cities with 10,000 to 90,000 inhabitants or in popular neighborhoods of large and medium cities. Its business model consists of a warehouse that offers the consumer mainly essential products through departments such as groceries, perishables and household items, with the main objective of offering the best price to the community or area where it is located. In the warehouse supermarket sector, AKÁ Súperbodega competes mainly with similar formats, such as:

- Soriana Mercado and Soriana Express from Soriana
- Bodega Aurrerá Express from Walmart
- Mi Tienda del Ahorro from H-E-B
- Ley Express and Súper Ley Express from Casa Ley

Before its integration, it competed with Chedraui, Súper Chedraui and Súper Che

=== Foreign formats (United States of America) ===
==== Chedraui USA (formerly Bodega Latina Corporation) ====
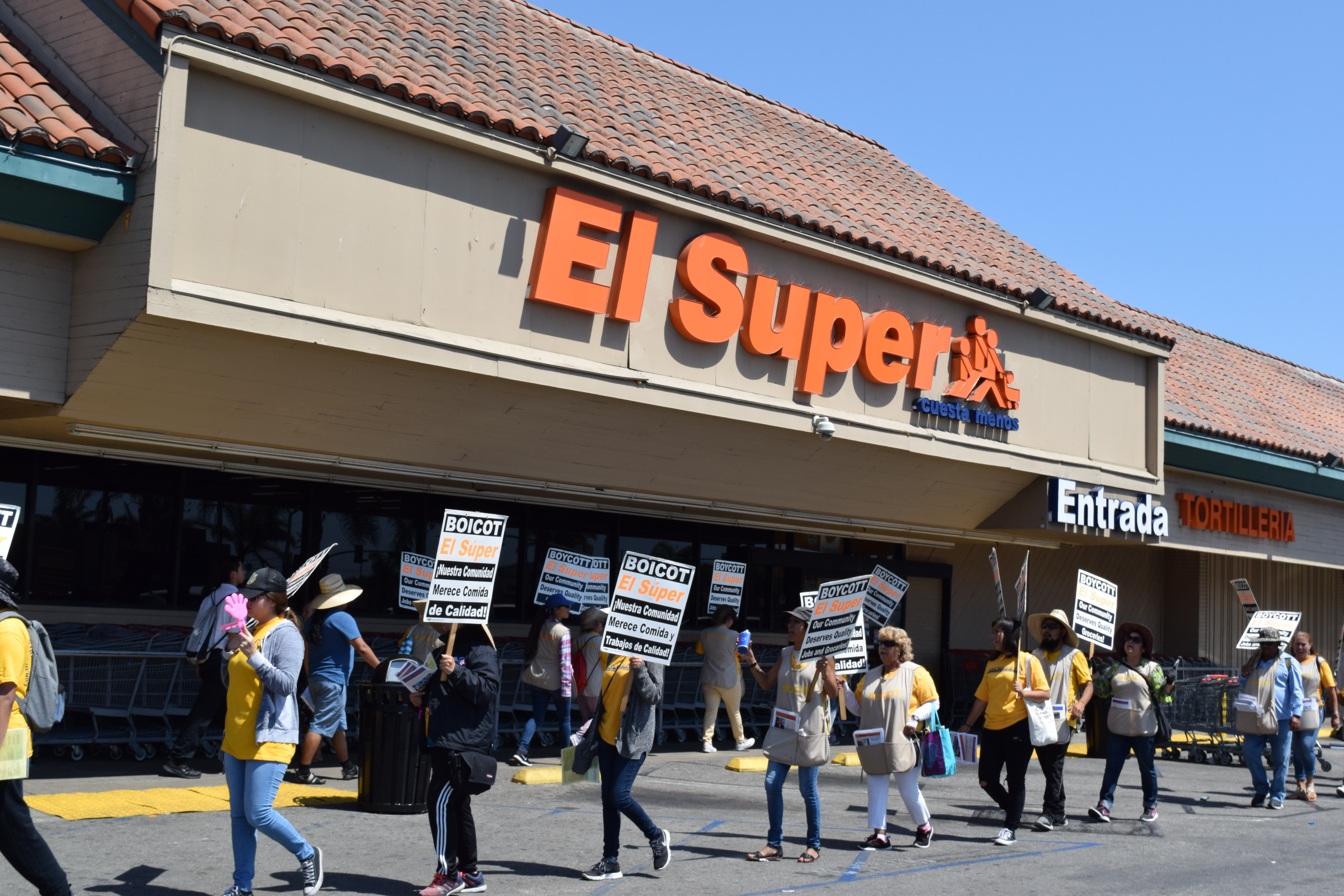
An El Súper supermarket in Oxnard, California

- El Súper: As part of an international expansion, Chedraui maintains a presence in the United States under the format and trade name of El Súper since the opening of its first branch in 1997 in South Gate, California. This small-format supermarket format is aimed at the Spanish-speaking community residing in the United States and with it, products and merchandise of groceries, perishables, butchery, among others, are sold, in addition to supplying and marketing more Mexican products in the United States of America. On May 27, 2008, after the purchasing of Tiendas Gigante by part by Soriana, the Mexican supermarket stores Soriana sold the 7 Gigante stores in the United States of America (known as Gigante USA) to Chedraui, which all the Gigante USA stores located in the State from California, in the United States of America were converted to El Súper. Currently, this store format has a presence in California, Nevada, Arizona, New Mexico and Texas.
- Smart & Final: For an amount of 620 million dollars, Chedraui acquires the Smart & Final stores from the subsidiary Bodega Latina and the private equity firm Apollo Global Management Inc, whose format was founded in 1871 under the original name of Hellman, Haas. in the City of Los Angeles, California, which focuses on wholesale and semi-wholesale sales through groceries, perishables, general merchandise and clothing, among others. Currently, in the United States of America, it operates 254 branches in the States of Nevada, Arizona and California.
- Fiesta Mart: In April 2018, Grupo Chedraui acquired the Fiesta Mart self-service stores, which was originally founded in 1972 in the city of Houston, Texas. They are Latin American supermarkets aimed mainly at the Spanish-speaking community of the United States of America, which is responsible for providing the consumer with departments such as groceries, fruits and vegetables, fish and seafood, meats, deli, cheeses, dairy products, frozen foods, bakeries, tortillas, Hispanic products (sauces, sweets, drinks and household items of this nature), international products, flowers, clothing and accessories. Currently, in the United States of America, it has a presence in Texas cities such as Austin, Dallas, Fort Worth and Houston.

== See also ==
- Soriana
- Comercial Mexicana
