= Toks =

Mexican fast casual restaurant chain

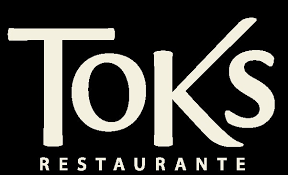
Logo

Toks is a Mexican fast casual restaurant chain owned by Grupo Gigante. It was founded in 1971 and has close to 200 locations across Mexico.

== Foundation and profile ==
Toks was founded in 1971 in Mexico City. Its first location was in the northern part of the city close to the Basilica of Our Lady of Guadalupe. Since its creation, Toks was owned by Grupo Gigante, a holding conglomerate. Grupo Gigante created Toks to increase its market share in the restaurant industry.

== Recent history ==
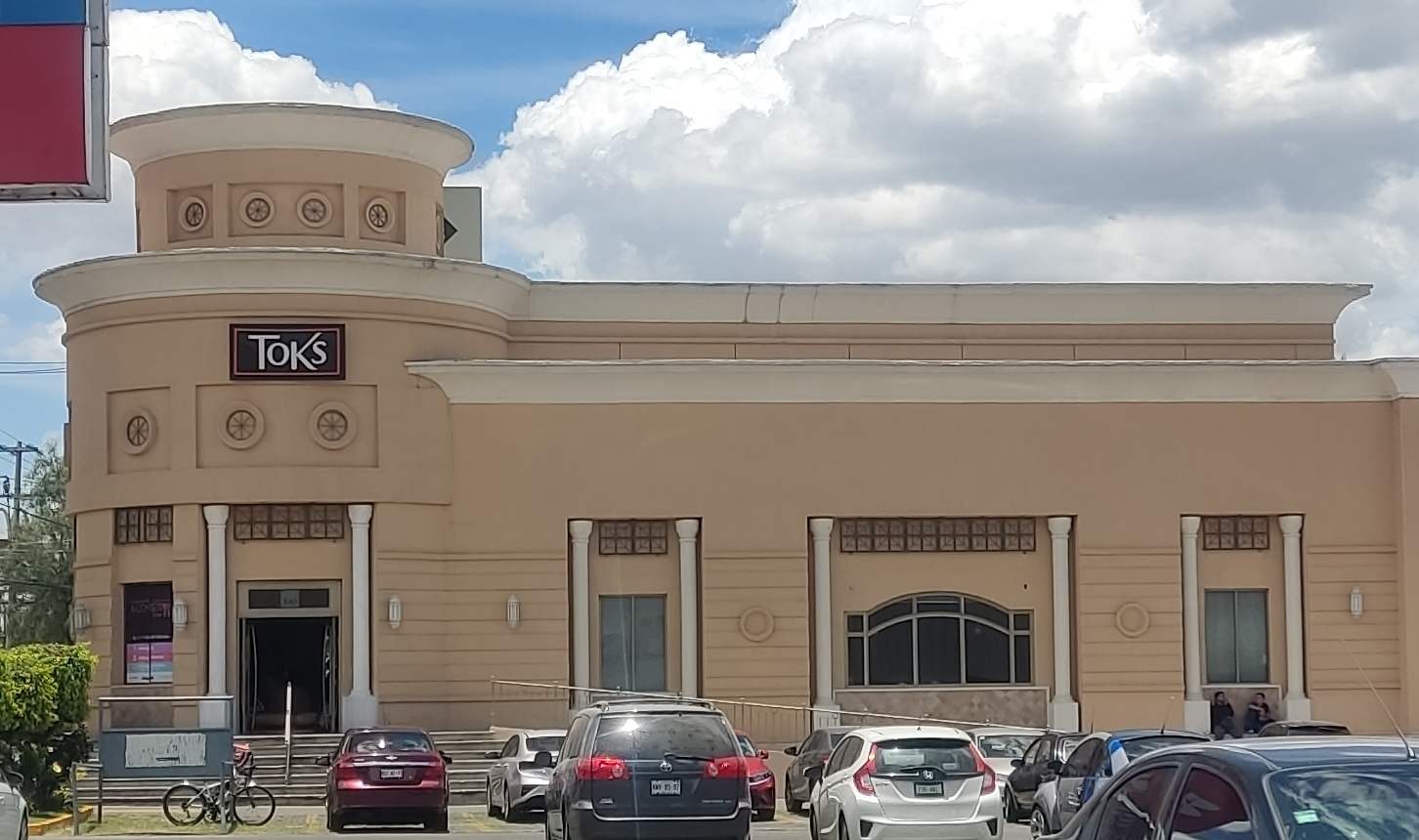
A restaurant in Coacalco de Berriozábal, in Greater Mexico City

In 2014, Toks had an 8% market share in Mexico's restaurant industry. The leader in this sector was Vips, which held 15%.

In 2016, Toks announced they were opening ten new restaurants across Mexico. Gustavo Pérez, Director of Toks' Social Responsibility Department, said that Toks' growth was of 15 to 18% every year, while the rest of the industry was experiencing 2 to 3% growth. Along with the opening of more locations, Toks also announced the acquisition of Restaurantes California, a chain owned by Comercial Mexicana. Sales increased for Toks in 2016, and eventually surpassed those of Vips, by serving at least 33.5 million customers that year. The average meal per customer was MXN$125. That year, Toks' growth accounted for 15% of Grupo Gigante's total revenue.

In 2018, Toks invested between 350 and 400 million Mexican pesos (18,000,000—20,000,000 USD) as part of their expansion strategy to open sixteen new locations in Mexico. In an interview with the press, General Director Juan Carlos Alverde stated that Toks was planning to end the year with 205 or 208 locations open. He explained that they were expanding in the State of Mexico, in the area known as El Bajío, in southeastern Mexico, and in Monterrey. He said the firm wanted to open locations in Tamaulipas, Sonora, and Chihuahua, where Toks did not yet operate a location. When asked about his competition in the market, Alverde explained that Toks competed with both small restaurants and large chains. He concluded the interview by stating that Toks had been innovating their business since 2001 to increase restaurant attendance.
