= Grupo Gigante =

Mexican retail conglomerate

Grupo Gigante, S.A.B. de C.V.

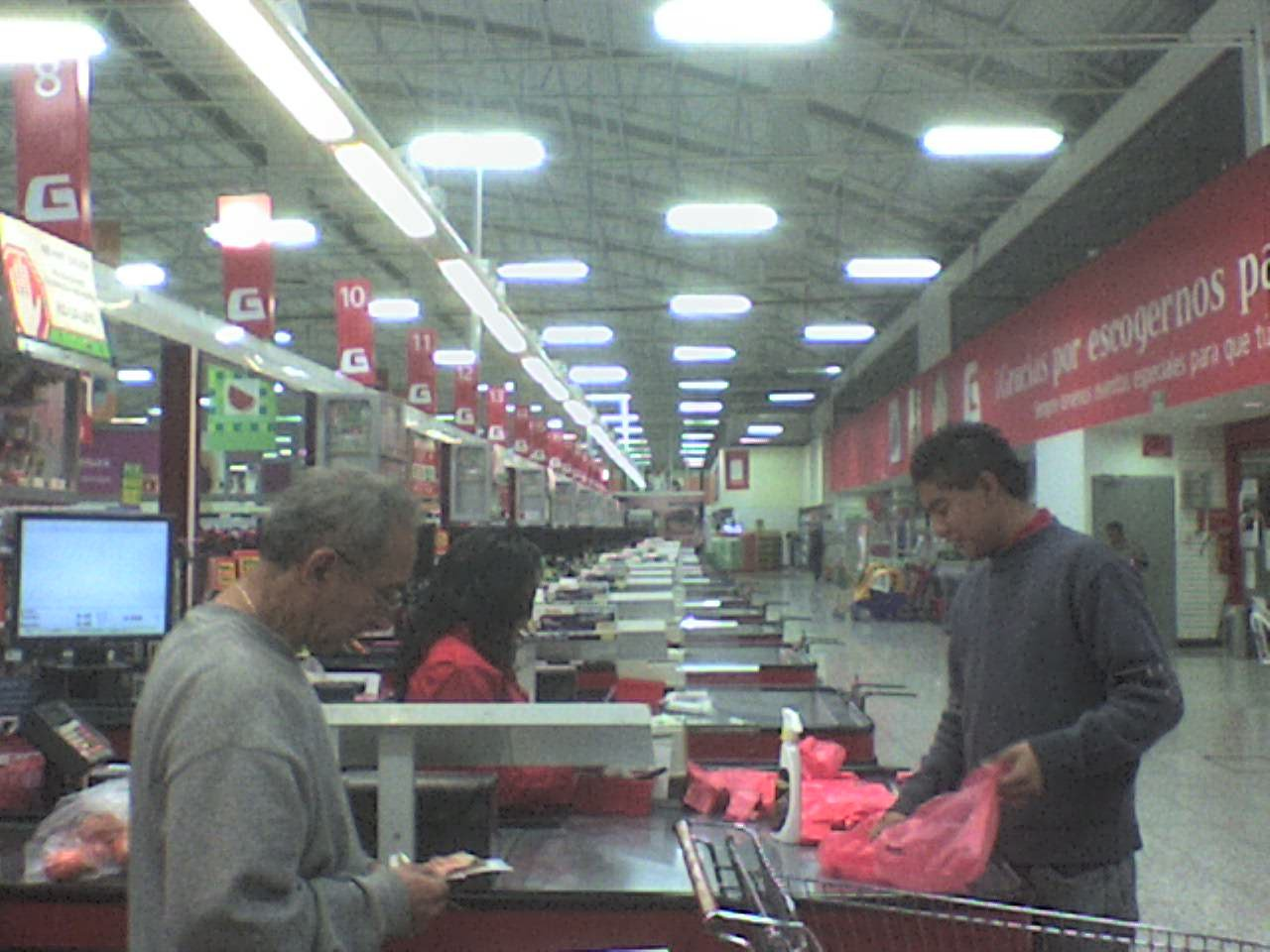
- Type: Public
- Traded as: BMV: GIGANTE*
- Industry: Retail
- Founded: 1962 (Mexico City, Mexico)
- Headquarters: Mexico City, Mexico
- Key people: Angel Losada Gómez
- Products: Stationeries, Home and Fashion Stores, Hard-Discount stores and Restaurants.
- Website: www.gigante.com.mx

Grupo Gigante is a holding listed at Mexican Stock Exchange founded in 1962, enterprises includes: Office Depot, The Home Store, SuperPrecio and Toks. The namesake hypermarkets and supermarkets were sold in 2008 to Soriana. Between 1992 and December 2008, Grupo Gigante operated a joint venture with RadioShack.

== History ==
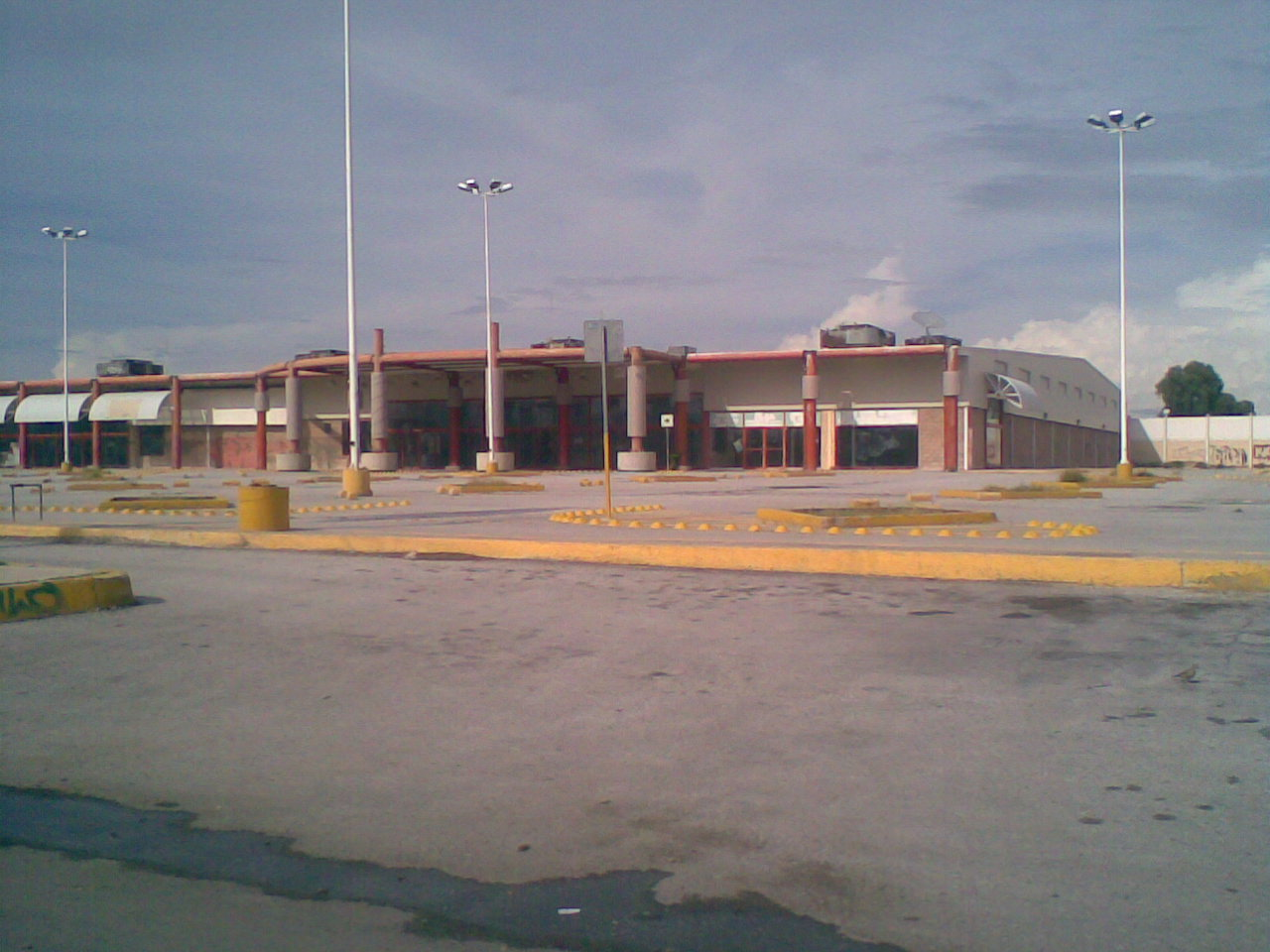
A former store in Gómez Palacio, Durango

- 1923: Comes from Spain to port of Veracruz, Ángel Losada Gómez; a 15-year-old who wanted to succeed in the business world.
- 1940: Angel Losada Gomez founded "La Comercial" in Apan, Hidalgo in the state, foundations of the current Gigante. Currently, the store has Apan stay in the market under the name of “La Moderna”.
- 1962: Birth of the first store “Gigante” in Mixcoac, with 64 departments, 250 employees and 65 office store. Gigante Mixcoac was placed as a convenience store Latin America's largest and second on the continent with 32,000 square feet (3,000 m^{2}) of total area.
- 1971: The company diversified its activities by opening its first coffee family in Mexico City under the trade name of "Toks".
- 1977: In this year, Gigante can operate 12 stores.
- 1979: Gigante takes an important step, expanding in the rest of the country, opening its first store outside Mexico City in the city of Guadalajara, later expanding with 8 more stores. The Gigante slogan dates from this year.
- 1980: Gigante bought the supermarket Maxi from Guadalajara. Between 1980 and 1990, it opened 9 stores in the cities of Querétaro, Celaya, Acapulco, Puebla, Salamanca and Morelia. In the late 1980s it already had 32 stores in operation in four cities.
- 1981: Launches Gigante products "Selección Gigante" (white brand).
- 1982: This year the company opened its first specialty restaurant. It now operates four specialty restaurants Mexican, Italian and Spanish: "El Campanario", "Tutto Bene", "La Viña del Quijote" and "Casa Rodrigo."
- 1988: Gigante expands to Monterrey, Saltillo, Torreón, Nuevo Laredo, Reynosa, Durango, Ciudad Victoria, Matamoros, San Luis Potosí, Tijuana and Mexicali.
- 1991: Gigante opened its 100 store in Toluca, becoming the first supermarket chain to achieve a hundred stores in operation, under one brand.
- 1992: Grupo Gigante acquired stores "Blanco" and "El Sardinero"; thus strengthening its national presence. From the early 1990s, Gigante developed various formats, like their co-investments:
  - Gigante
  - Bodega Gigante
  - Súper Gigante (before Súper G)
  - Súper Precio
  - Office Depot in partnership with Office Depot from the USA
  - RadioShack in partnership with Tandy Corporation
- 1993: The Híper G format, a broader format of the commercial chain, is put to the test, opening the first branch in Eduardo Molina, in Mexico City (currently Chedraui)
- 1994: In association with the commercial chain of French origin Carrefour, the first Carrefour store in Mexico was opened, in what was the Hiper G branch on Av. Eduardo Molina in Mexico City, thus marking Carrefour's incursion into the Mexican territory.
- 1997: Grupo Gigante breaks ties with the French retail chain Carrefour.
- 2000: Gigante open market in the southeast of the country, with branches in Campeche, Yucatan, Tabasco, Chiapas and Quintana Roo. Starts the format “Super Gigante” with the first branch “Cumbres” in Monterrey city, as an evolution of the format "Super G".
- 2001: Gigante continues to expand, adding to the group the chain stores “Super MAZ” in the southeast.
- 2002: Grupo Gigante and PriceSmart Inc. in a joint venture, opened the first three PriceSmart stores in the country, in Celaya, Irapuato, and Queretaro.
- 2004: Gigante starts a new concept of store in their Coapa store.
- 2005: In February the group begins to face economic difficulties, due to slow response of the market and lack of profits, all the PriceSmart stores in Mexico were closed (Celaya and Irapuato stores became Home Depot). Likewise, the French commercial chain Carrefour, also due to lack of profitability, leaves Mexico selling its branches to the Chedraui commercial chains (Mexico City, Guadalajara, Puebla, Cuernavaca, Acapulco, Toluca, León, Querétaro, Aguascalientes, San Luis Potosí, Villahermosa, Mérida and Cancún), Soriana (Saltillo, Chihuahua, Ciudad Juárez and Hermosillo) and Walmart (Monterrey); for that year they had already closed operations in Baja California, Sonora, Chihuahua and Coahuila and sold their stores to Soriana in the north of the country. The remaining branches (most of them) were sold to Grupo Chedraui, except for the Valle Oriente branch in Monterrey, Nuevo León, which was transferred to Walmart, due to Chedraui's reluctance and refusal to invest in the Metropolitan Area of Monterrey, despite having a distribution center in its northern area.
- 2007: In a new strategy Grupo Gigante sold its supermarket stores to Organización Soriana which purchased represented more than 50% of the Gigante stores, this included the stores located in the United States. Grupo Gigante kept its joint ventures and “Super Precio” stores and created its new “Gigante Grupo Inmobiliario” (Gigante Real Estate Group).
- 2008: Begins to operate, with the opening of the branch channel Tezontle Avenue in Mexico City, The Home Store format, dedicated to selling decorative items. Grupo Gigante sold to its partner, the Tandy Corporation U.S., its 50% of RadioShack stores in Mexico, specialized in selling electronics products.

== See also ==
- Official page of Grupo Gigante
