= City Market (Mexico) =

Mexican grocery store chain

City Market in Mexico is a chain of gourmet grocery stores owned by La Comer.

== History ==
The first City Market opened in 2006 in Interlomas. The second opened in 2008 in Colonia del Valle, and the third in 2011 in Las Lomas.

In 2015, the acquisition of Comercial Mexicana by Soriana slowed down the growth of City Market stores for at least a year. One store opened in Mexico City in February 2015.

In September 2016, the first City Market store outside of Mexico City opened in Querétaro. In November 2017, La Comer group announced a 200-million pesos investment to open its first City Market store in Guadalajara. In July 2018, City Market opened its first store in the state of Morelos. By December 2018, City Market had 11 stores throughout Mexico. In May 2019, City Market opened its first store in Monterrey.

In 2018, City Market was the only retail store in the world, along with Harrod's and Le Bon Marché, to sell raw Kobe beef.

== Description ==
City Market is a chain of gourmet grocery stores that distributes food and drinks imported from 25 different countries. The chain is owned by Comercial City Fresko.

== City Market Café ==
In 2025 City Market Café was opened on Galileo street in Polanco, with an upscale café-restaurant, coffee, pastry, gelato, gourmet and delicatessen take-away counters, and small selection of groceries and homeware, no supermarket.
