= Coppel =

Mexican department store chain

Coppel S.A. de C.V.

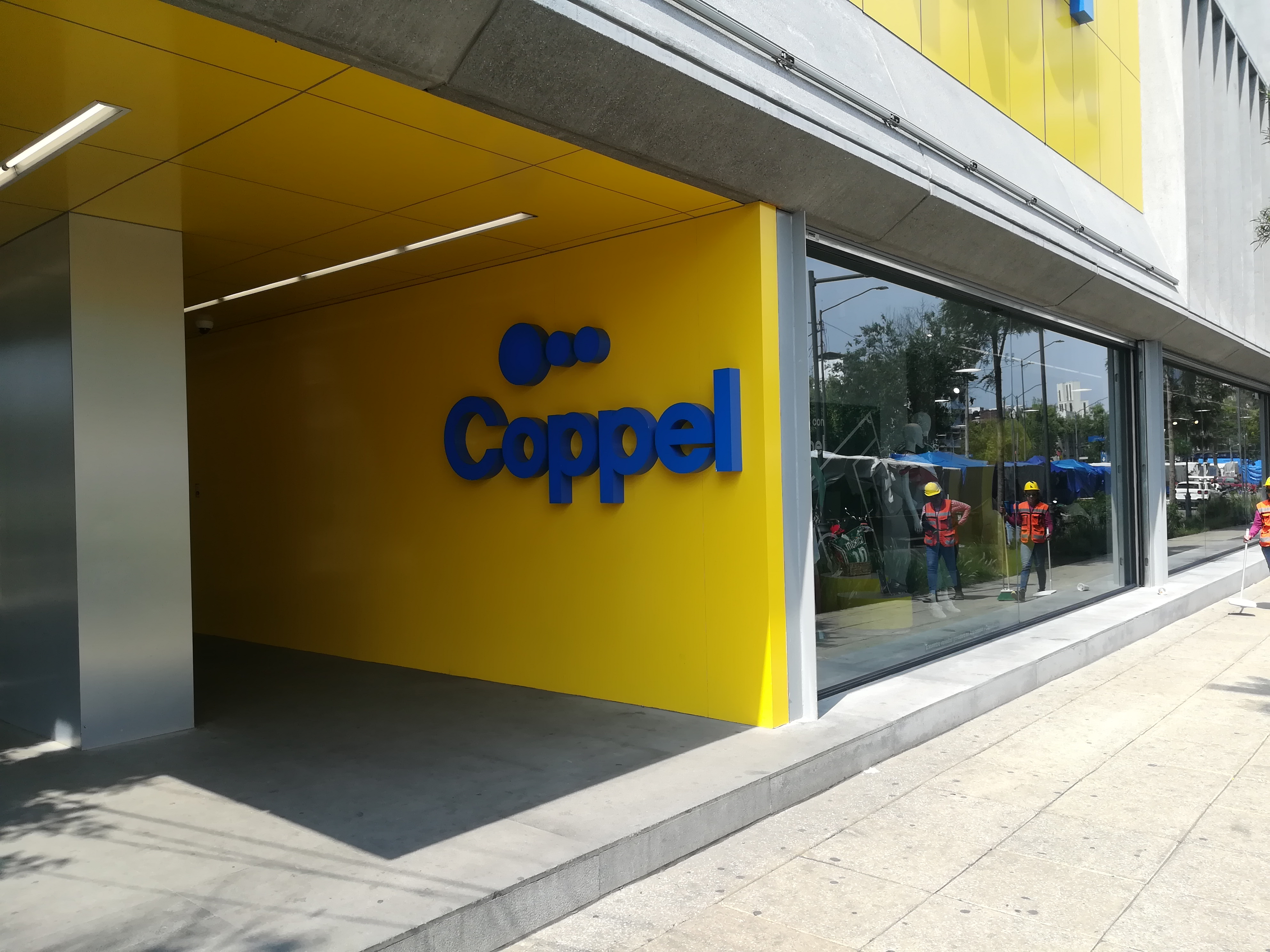
- Industry: Retail
- Founded: 1941; 85 years ago
- Headquarters: Culiacán, Sinaloa, Mexico
- Area served: Mexico, Argentina, Brazil
- Products: Consumer goods
- Number of employees: 500,000
- Website: www.coppel.com

Coppel is a nationwide department store in Mexico based in Culiacán, Sinaloa and founded in 1941. It is noted for extending easy credit and for enabling payment of purchases via twice-monthly installments.

Coppel began with its creator Enrique Coppel Tamayo who set up shop in Mazatlán, later moving to Culiacán. By 1990 the chain had 24 stores. In 2002 it bought Canadá shoe stores. This allowed Coppel to become one of the main distributors in Mexico not only of shoes but cellphones, clothing, televisions and furniture.

It is today one of the 100 largest companies in Mexico according to Expansión, with sales higher than Sears, El Palacio de Hierro and Famsa. In 2015, it purchased the 51-store Viana chain to convert them to Coppel stores with an investment of 2.5 billion Mexican pesos, around 150 million USD.

According to Deloitte, Coppel is ranked 156th-largest retailer in the world with sales in fiscal year 2015 of 6.156 billion USD.

In 2020 Coppel implemented the Universidad Corporativa Coppel for Coppel employees who have 3 months of seniority, as well as for direct relatives aiming to make its staff more qualified and grow professionally.
