= Cuidado con el Perro =

Mexican clothing store chain

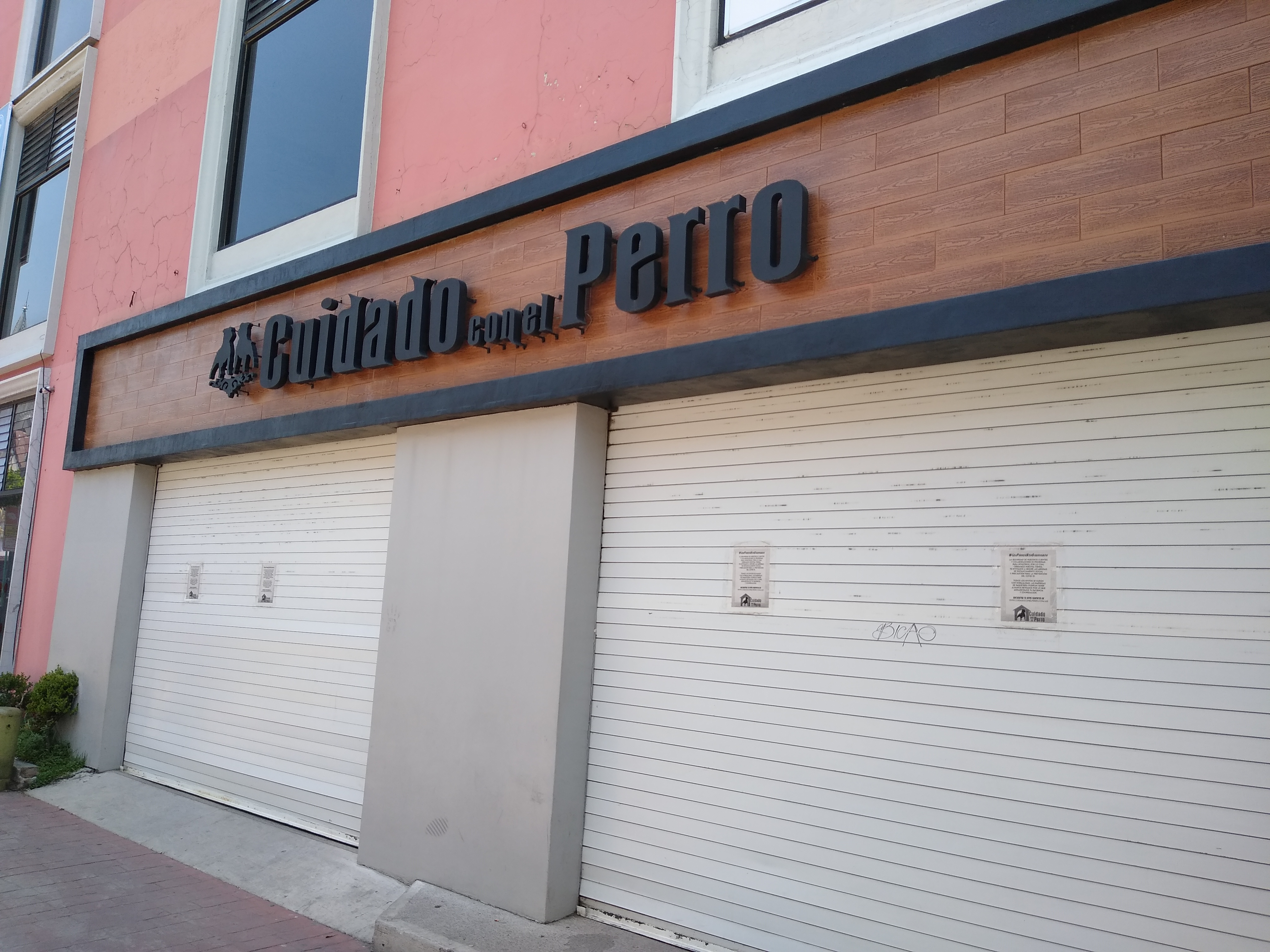
A Cuidado con el Perro store in Tlaxcala closed during the COVID-19 pandemic

Cuidado con el Perro (Spanish: Beware of the dog) is a chain of more than 200 clothing stores across Mexico, the United States, and Guatemala owned by Grupo Alfar. It was founded in 2007.

== Brand concept ==
The brand has clothing lines for women, children and men and states that the lines are for people living an urban lifestyle who like to keep up with the latest worldwide trends.

== Stores ==
Store sizes range from 115 to 2,400 square meters and are present in shopping malls and shopping streets across Mexico, the United States and Guatemala.

== Grupo Alfar ==
Grupo Alfar is a family business founded in 1990, initially as Avante Textil, in the hands of Rafael Kalach Romano. The company manages clothing brands such as Cuidado con el Perro, Óptima and García. In June 2023 Grupo Alfar bought C&A Mexico, which in June 2023 had 78 stores across the country, and had grown to 85 stores by December 2023.
