= Casa Ley =

Mexican grocery store chain

Casa Ley, S.A.P.I. de C.V.
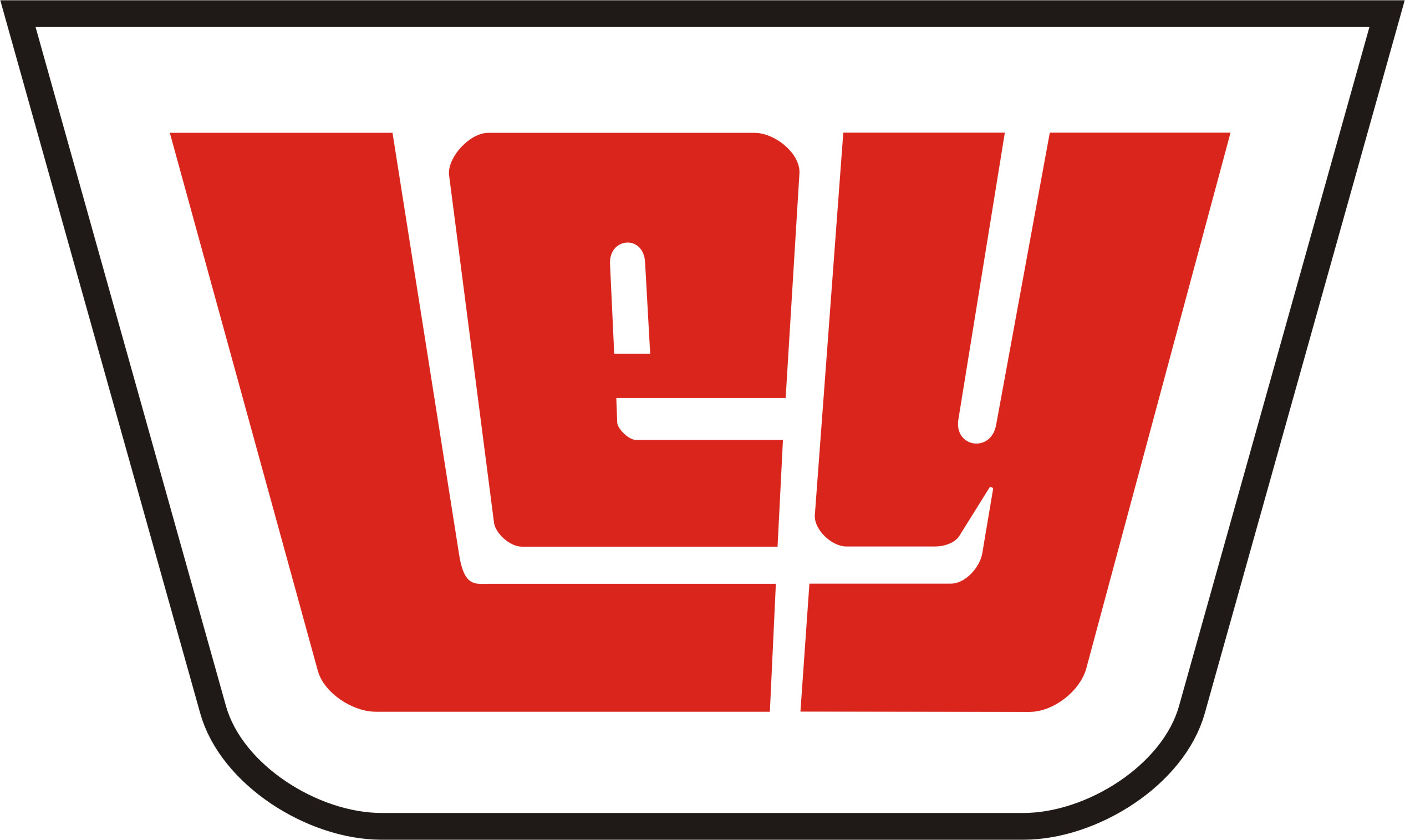
- Casa Ley logo
- Type: Private
- Industry: Supermarket, Grocery
- Founded: September 1954; 71 years ago in Culiacán, Sinaloa, Mexico
- Founder: Juan Ley Fong (Lee Fong)
- Headquarters: Culiacán, Sinaloa, Mexico
- Number of locations: 300+
- Area served: Mexico
- Key people: Juan Manuel Ley (CEO & Chairman)
- Brands: Chics (1972-2022); Wok Express (1999-present)
- Services: bakery, dairy, deli, dry cleaning, frozen foods, grocery, meat, pharmacy, produce, seafood, snacks, liquor, and money transfers
- Number of employees: 22,000
- Website: casaley.com.mx

Casa Ley is a Mexican grocery store chain based in Culiacán founded in 1954 by Juan Ley Fong. Most of its stores are located in western Mexico, in the states of Baja California, Sonora, Sinaloa, Nayarit, Jalisco, Colima, Coahuila, Durango, Guanajuato, and Baja California Sur. It is Mexico's largest privately held supermarket chain. For years, 49% of the chain was owned by American supermarket chain Safeway Inc., which later went to Albertsons Companies, Inc. after it acquired Safeway in 2015. In 2018, Albertsons divested its 49% share to Tenedora CL del Noroeste, ending the company's international operations.

== History ==
The company originally started as a small village shop in the mining town of Tayoltita, where Ley offered his goods to the gold and silver miners of the San Luis Mining Company. In 1948, a theft by a close friend and colleague forced Ley to eventually close his shop and leave the town, in search of a new location. The family moved to Culiacán, and in September 1954 the company Casa Ley was born.

== Formats ==
=== Ley ===
Casa Ley's flagship format conceptualized as a hypermarket with 3,500 to 11,000 square meters of sales floor, whose sales system is retail, which handles a wide assortment in the grocery, perishable food, prepared food, and selection of general merchandise and clothing.

As a hybrid format between a hypermarket and a self-service warehouse, its main competitors are:

- Walmart de México y Centroamérica, under its formats: Walmart and Bodega Aurrerá
- Soriana stores in their formats: Soriana Híper, MEGA Soriana, Soriana Híper Plus and Soriana Mercado
- Chedraui in its formats: Chedraui and Super Che
- Grupo La Comer, in their format La Comer
- Grupo Futurama, in their format Alsúper Plus
- H-E-B Mexico, in its formats: H-E-B and Mi Tienda del Ahorro

=== Súper Ley ===
They are supermarkets created with the objective of offering consumers quick purchases as well as quality and freshness in their departments within a sales floor of between 1,000 and 3,500 square meters, through which they offer daily consumption products such as groceries, perishable foods and prepared food.

As a general supermarket, your competitors are:

- Walmart de México y Centroamérica, under the format: Walmart Express (formerly Superama)
- Soriana stores in their format: Soriana Super
- Chedraui in their formats: Super Chedraui
- Grupo Futurama, in their format Alsúper

- Fresh Market Ley
- Ley Express
- Súper Ley Express
- Súper Ley Express Fresh
- Ley Mayoreo
- Súper Mayoreo Ley
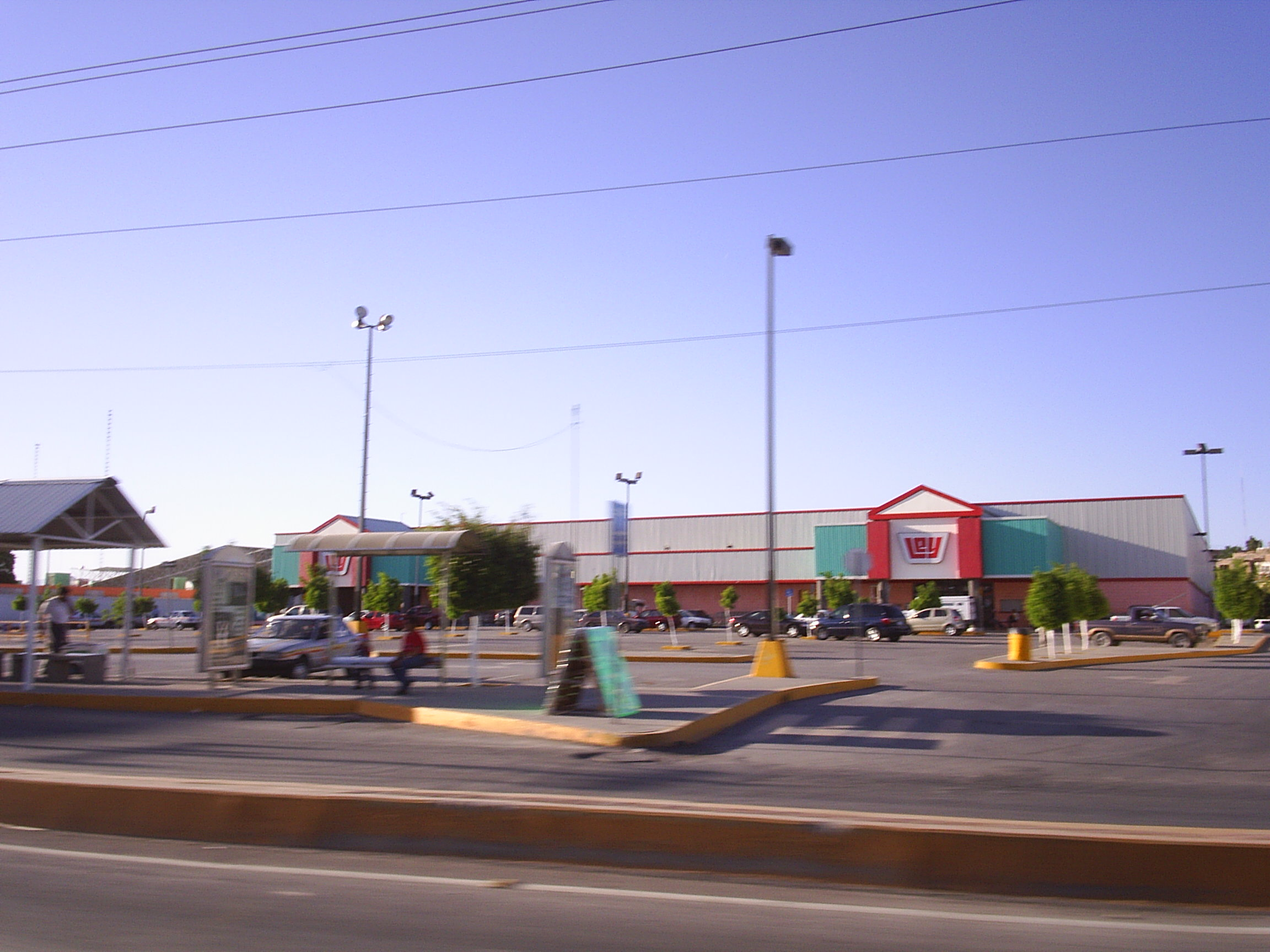
Ley Store

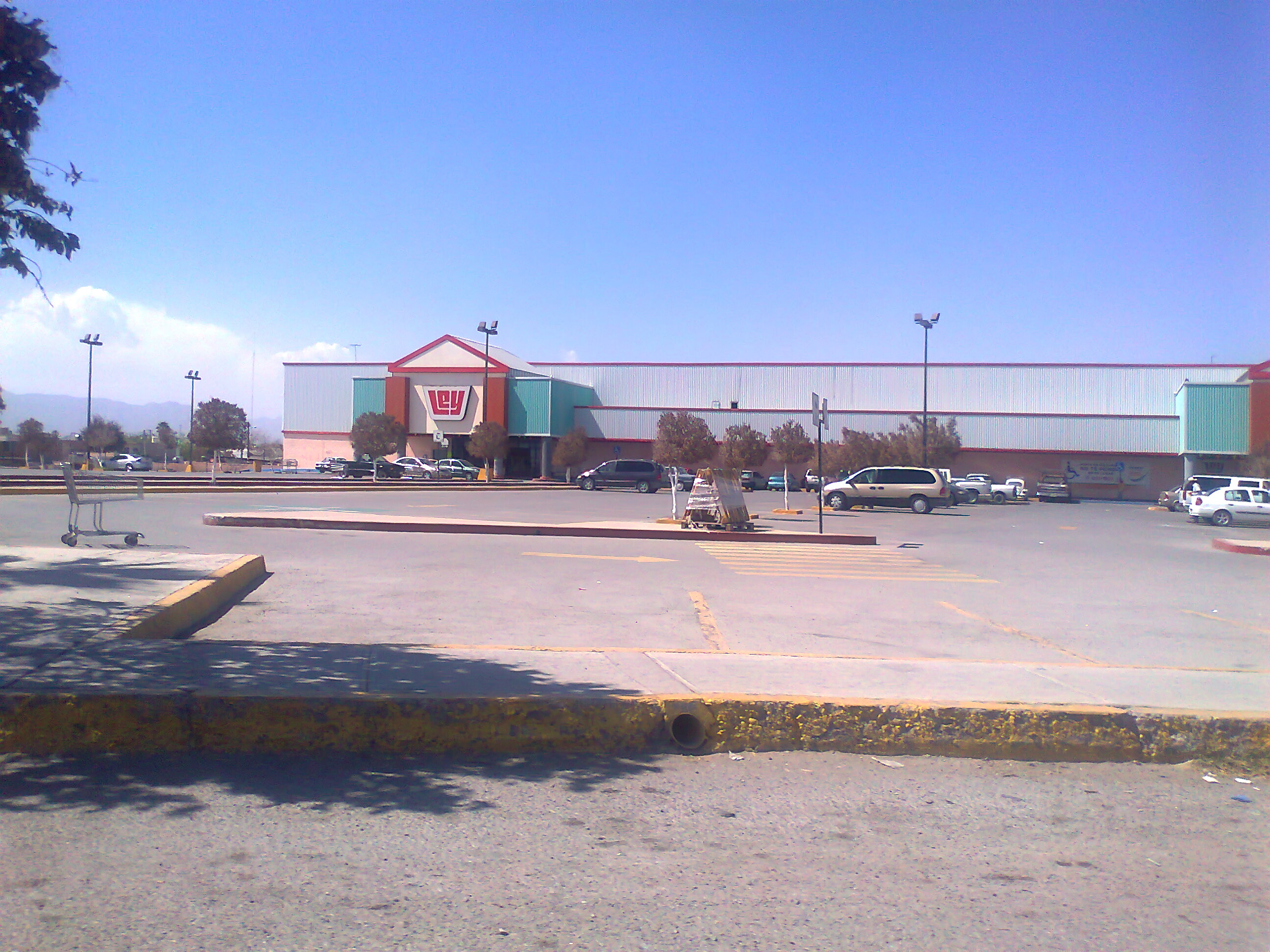
Another Ley Store

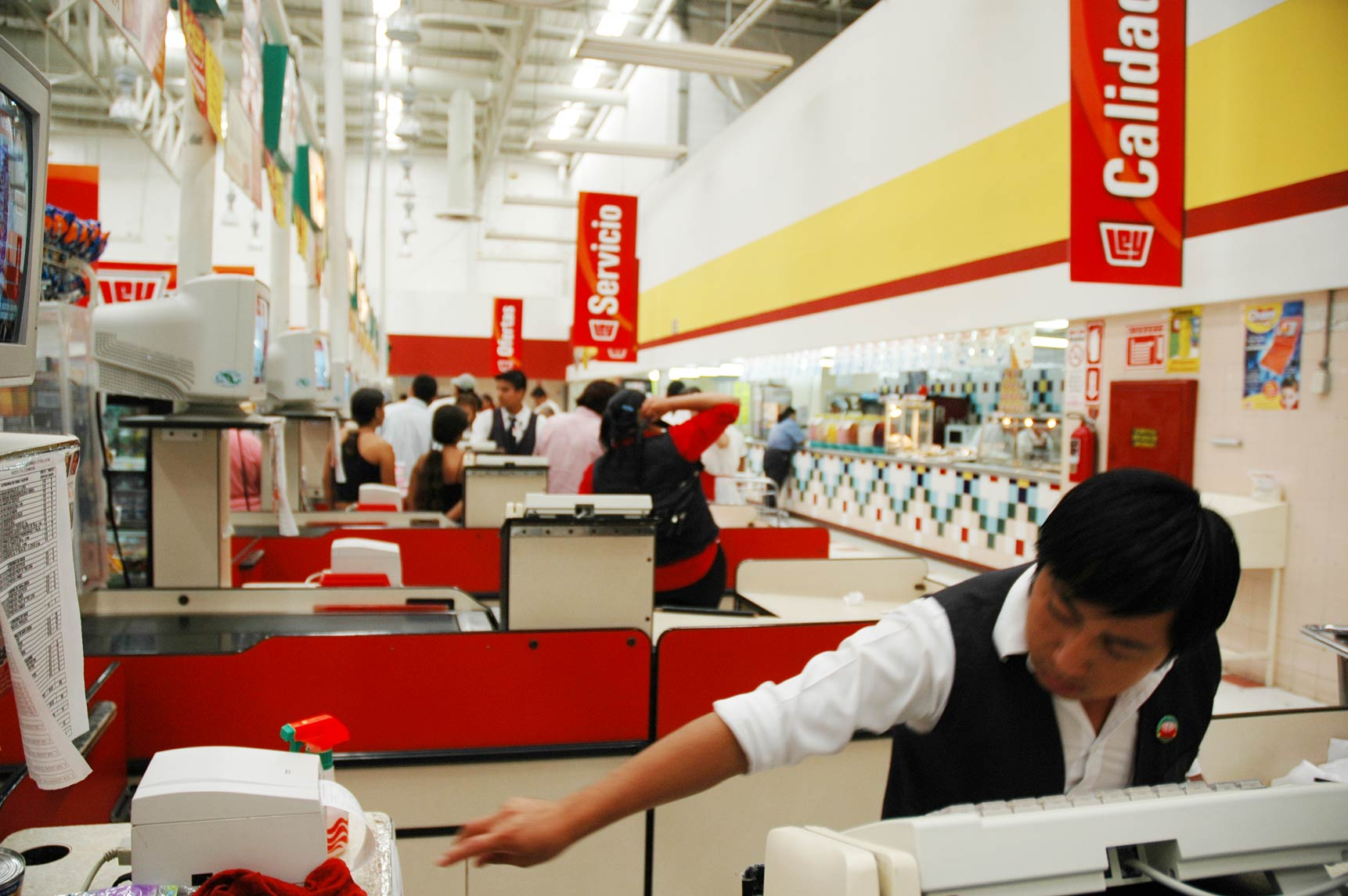
Checkout lane

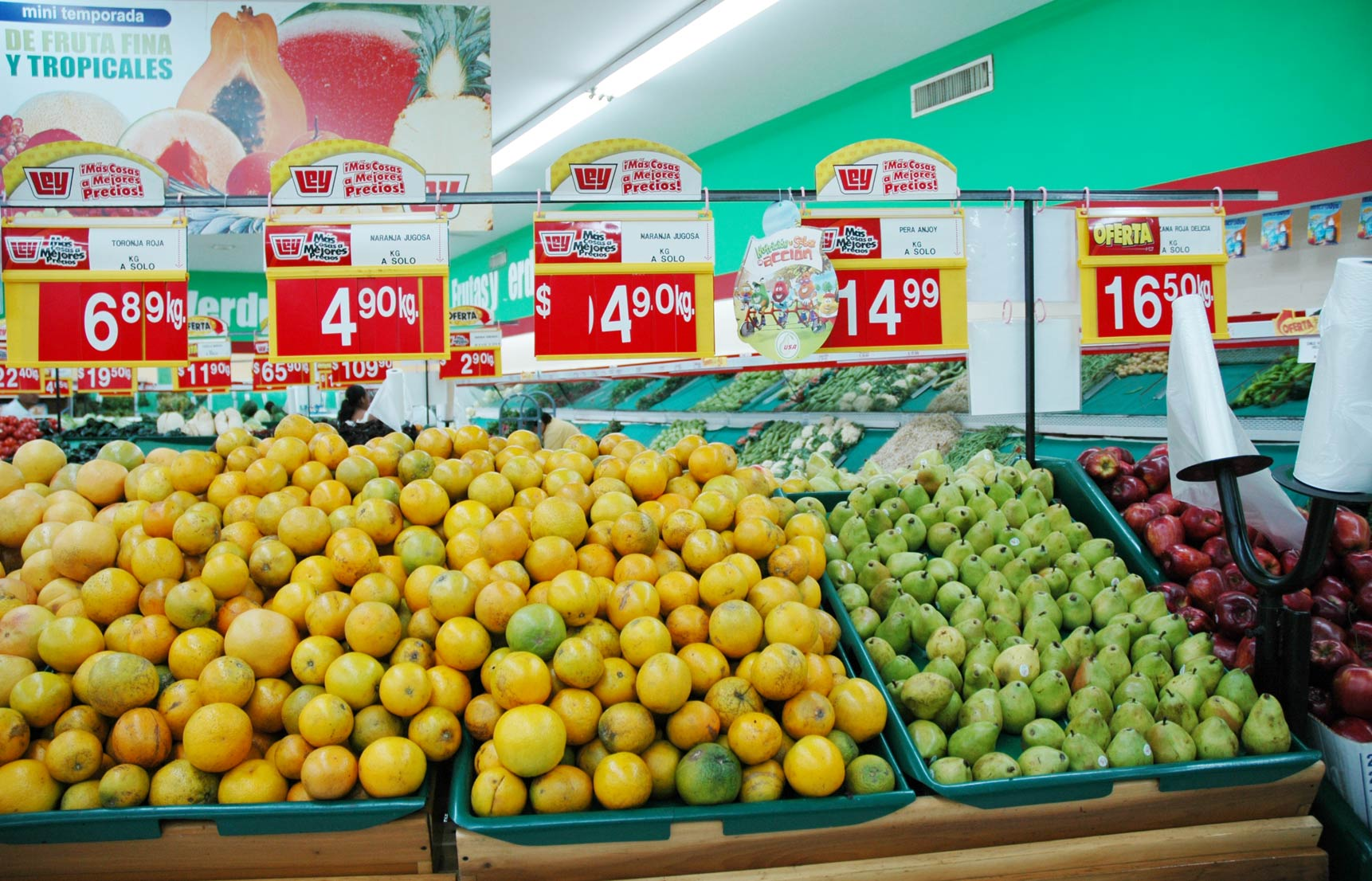
Produce area
