= S-Mart =

Mexican supermarket chain

Supermercados S-Mart
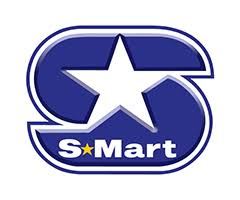
- Type: Sociedad Anónima Bursátil de Capital Variable
- Industry: Retail
- Founded: 1975; 51 years ago
- Headquarters: Ciudad Juárez, Chihuahua, Mexico
- Key people: Enrique Muñoz, Javier Arturo Munoz Delgado (Founder)
- Products: Consumer goods
- Website: www.supermercadossmart.com

S-Mart is a Mexican grocery store chain in the northern Mexican states of Chihuahua, Nuevo Leon, and Tamaulipas. S-Mart competes with Soriana and Wal-Mart. S-Mart opened its first store in Ciudad Juárez, then later expanded to 33 stores in Ciudad Juarez. S-Mart now has 38 stores in Ciudad Juárez, 8 in Chihuahua, 17 in Monterrey, 8 in Reynosa, 5 in Nuevo Laredo and 4 in Matamoros.

== Sponsor ==
S-Mart was the shirt sponsor of the Liga MX team FC Juárez.
