= Calimax =

Mexican grocery store chain

- Current logo
- Company type: Private
- Industry: Supermarket, Grocery
- Founded: 1939; 87 years ago in Tijuana, Baja California, Mexico
- Headquarters: Tijuana, Mexico
- Number of locations: 117
- Number of employees: 6,000
- Website: calimax.com.mx

Calimax Logo used until 2010

Calimax is a local grocery store chain operating in the Mexican states of Baja California and Sonora. It was founded in the city of Tijuana, Baja California, in 1939. The company remains headquartered in Tijuana, and it has many locations on several cities of Baja California.

The company has 78 stores in the following cities:

- Tijuana, Baja California—52
- Playas de Rosarito, Baja California—3
- Tecate, Baja California—3
- Mexicali, Baja California—17
- Ensenada, Baja California—18
- San Felipe, Baja California—1
- San Luis Río Colorado, Sonora—3

Calimax has a celebrated joint venture with Smart & Final Inc. As an independent company, Calimax counts with its own transportation from north to south and the biggest distribution center in Northern Mexico with thousands of suppliers in Mexico and USA.

The Calimax distribution center is one of the most modern in the country and is an important factor in the planning of the growth of the chain. With the fleet of more than 200 trucks that supply the needs of each store daily, It also has a modern meat processing plant, which guarantees the quality and freshness of the meat products.
