= Comercial Mexicana =

Mexican hypermarket company

Comercial Mexicana, S.A. de C.V.
- Type: Retail business
- Industry: Hypermarkets and Super Centers
- Founded: 1930; 96 years ago
- Founder: Antonino González Abascal; Carlos González Nova
- Defunct: May 2018
- Successor: Soriana; Bodega Soriana; Mega Soriana
- Headquarters: Mexico City, Mexico
- Key people: Santiago García García (CEO)
- Number of employees: 38,930
- Parent: Organicación Soriana
- Website: www.lacomer.com.mx

Tiendas Comercial Mexicana S.A. de C.V., colloquially known as La Comercial and La Comer, was a Mexican hypermarket group that operated mainly in Mexico City and Central Mexico. It was founded in 1930 and operated by Controladora Comercial Mexicana. From 2016 to 2018 it was owned and operated by Soriana, which also owns Alprecio stores. Comercial Mexicana, including its different store formats, was the third-largest supermarket chain in Mexico as of 2014.

== History ==
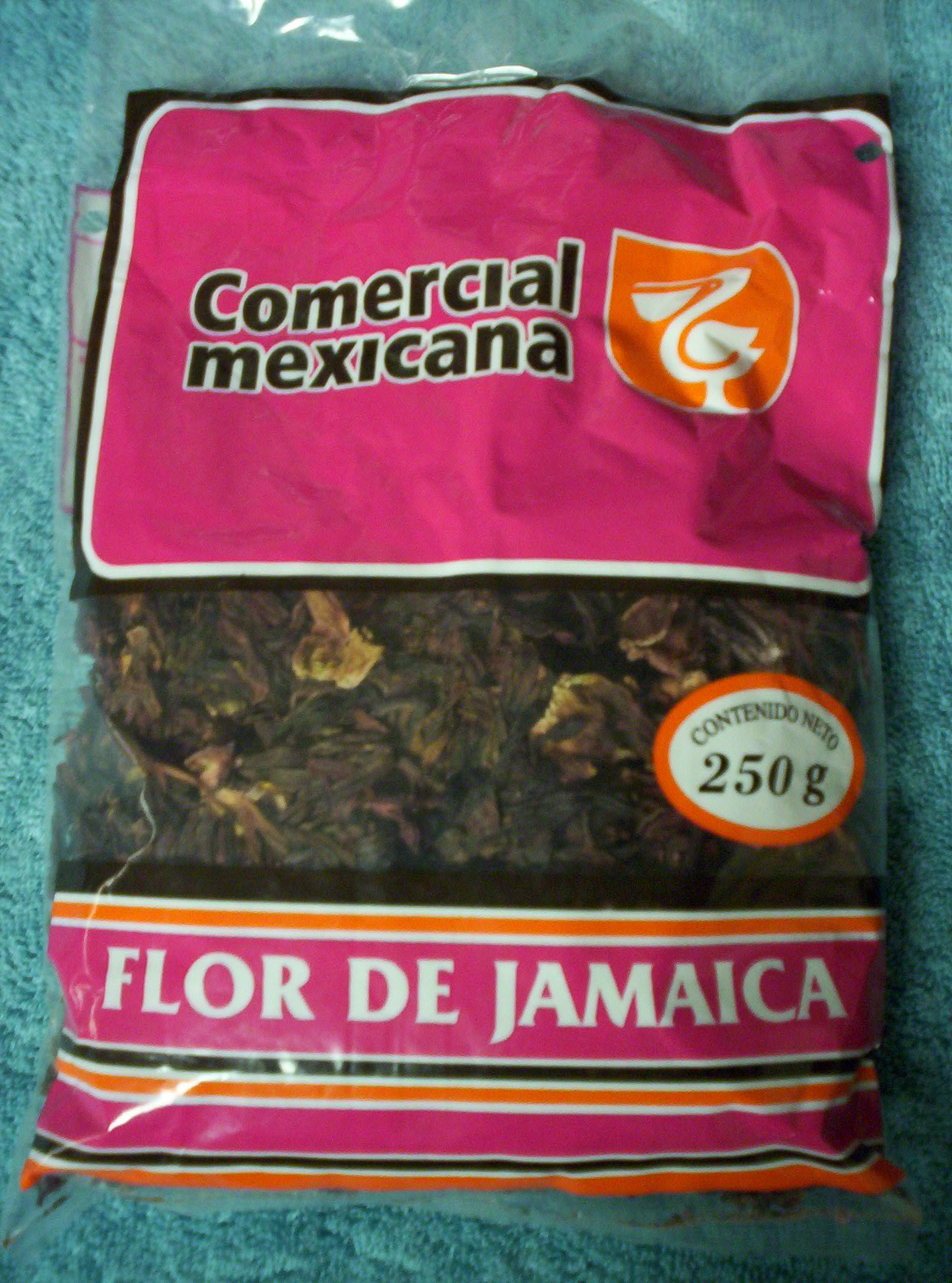
Comercial Mexicana brand Flor de Jamaica (Hibiscus flower)

The first store, which was opened by Carlos González Nova and his father, Antonino González Abascal, in Mexico City in 1930, primarily sold textile products.

In January 2015 it was announced that Organización Soriana would buy Comercial Mexicana stores, from which 118 will be fully owned while 42 would be leased and operated by third parties.

== Stores ==
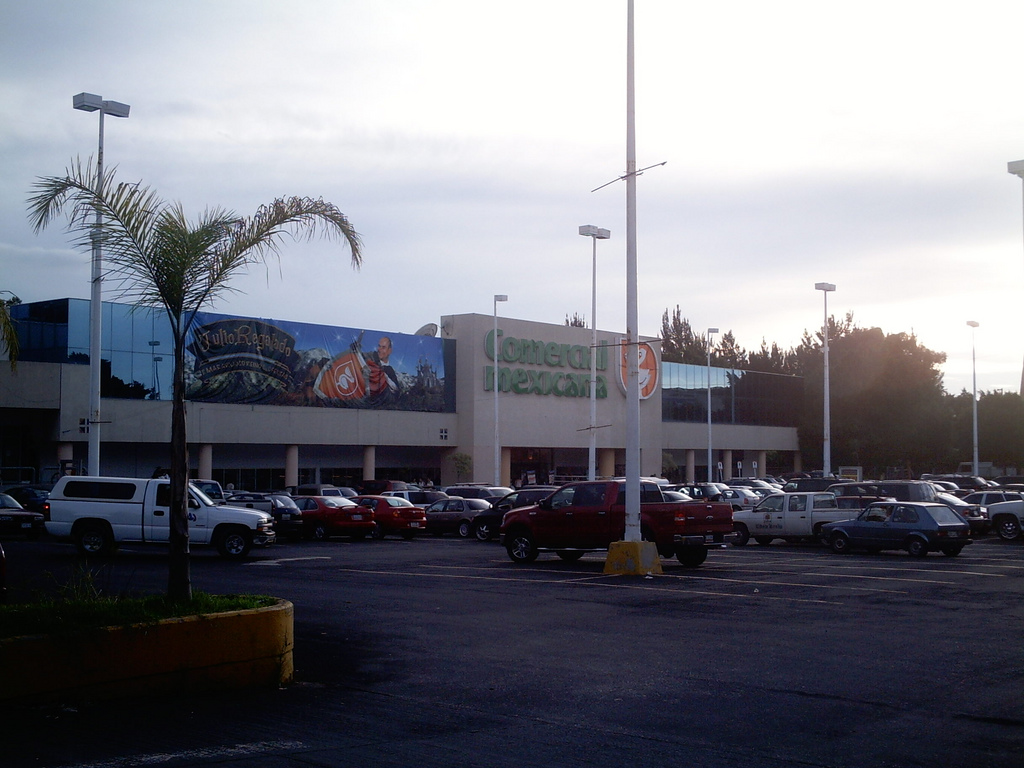
Comercial Mexicana store in Zamora, Michoacán

Comercial Mexicana had different retail formats, with the general stores branded as Comercial Mexicana, the larger stores as Mega Comercial Mexicana and its smaller facilities as Bodega Comercial Mexicana. Many of its general stores were connected to a shopping mall with competing businesses surrounding. An example was in Plaza Río in Tijuana, Baja California, which had a Comercial Mexicana as an anchor store but also has a traditional department store and smaller specialty stores selling items that could be purchased in Comercial Mexicana.

== Formats ==
Last slogan of Comercial Mexicana, shared with Soriana, used in 2018.

From 1962 to 2016, Controladora Comercial Mexicana (currently Grupo LaComer) managed 10 store formats, among which were hypermarkets (Comercial Mexicana), megamarkets (MEGA), self-service warehouses (Bodega Comercial Mexicana), general and premium supermarkets (Sumesa, Fresko and City Market), rural supermarkets (Alprecio), warehouse clubs (Costco) and restaurants (California Restaurants and Beer Factory).

Due to the financial crisis that Controladora Comercial Mexicana went through in 2008, the company decided to gradually dispense with its formats, being Costco the first Comercial Mexicana format to be sold to its US counterpart in 2012, in which said price club entered to the Mexican market through a joint venture in 1991, in which on July 14, 2012, Controladora Comercial Mexicana sold the stake in Costco México to its United States subsidiary Costco Wholesale Corporation for 12,791 million Mexican pesos. Likewise, on August 21, 2014, Controladora Comercial Mexicana sold its Beer Factory and California restaurants to Grupo Gigante for 1,061 million Mexican pesos, which were converted into Toks.

In 2015, with the agreement to sell stores to Soriana, Controladora Comercial Mexicana becomes a subsidiary of Tiendas Soriana; however, it only kept 143 of the 155 stores purchased. However, the process of unification and merger will be staggered, beginning with the joint operation of campaigns, such as that of Julio Regalado. Controladora CM has most of the branches of the original company (143 branches), which operate in the formats Tienda Comercial Mexicana, Bodega Comercial, Mega Comercial and AlPrecio. Between 2016 and 2018, Soriana had the rights to use the original name and logo of "Comercial Mexicana", so the stores that use this badge are those that are managed by the company originally from Torreón and currently based in Monterrey. After this time, these stores were renamed to one of the formats managed by the chain.

As of January 4, 2016, the new company "La Comer" was born, successor to the original company founded in 1930, which intends to manage the four profitable formats of the company, identified as City Market, Fresko, Sumesa and the new entity, known as "La Comer".

Unlike the previous company, it will not offer massive discounts but exclusively in El Buen Fin and its new concept of season of offers, Temporada Naranja (national pulicitaria campaign, successor to Julio Regalado); In addition, the new store will no longer offer clothing or footwear in its new formats. Initially, the company started with 54 units.

=== Current formats (Grupo LaComer) ===
- Comercial Mexicana (Currently LaComer)
- Fresko Comercial Mexicana (Currently Fresko LaComer)
- City Market
- Sumesa

=== Former formats (Soriana) ===
- MEGA Comercial Mexicana
- Bodega Comercial Mexicana
- Alprecio Comercial Mexicana

=== Former formats (Grupo Gigante and Costco Wholesale) ===
- Costco Wholesale (originally Price Club since 1992)
- Restaurantes California
- Beer Factory

== Programs ==
Comercial Mexicana also had programs for children. In exchange for working in stores as bag boys, the children received family support, tuition support and educational supplies, and basic services. The children wore almost-trademark brown uniforms with the orange pelican logo and were expected to be well groomed. They helped most of the customers out of the store and return the carts, which in turn kept the shopping cart thefts low.

== Executives ==
Carlos González Nova, Comercial Mexicana's co-founder, served as the chairman of the company's board of directors until 1998.

In 2000 he was responsible for killing musician Kirsty MacColl by striking with a powerboat he was operating recklessly, having entered a restricted area off the coast of Cozumel, Mexico. He remained the honorary chairman of Comercial Mexicana until his death on August 19, 2009, at the age of 92.

In 1998, Guillermo González Nova, younger brother of Carlos, became chairman of the board.

Carlos González Nova's son, Carlos González Zabalegui, was the last company's executive chairman and CEO.

== See also ==
- Soriana
- Chedraui
