= París-Londres =

Department store chain in Mexico

París-Londres, also known as "La Gran Boutique", was a chain of department stores that were briefly rebranded CLASS, then purchased by Grupo Cifra, owner of Suburbia, and rebranded as Suburbia in the 1990s after Mexico started to permit imports from abroad on a large scale. The main store was located at 81, 16 de Septiembre Street in the Historic Center of Mexico City, and there were branches at Perisur, Plaza Satélite and in Polanco.

== Stores ==
Stores were located in:

- Centro, Ave. 16 de Septiembre #81, now a VIPS restaurant.
- Colonia del Valle area, Avenida Insurgentes Sur 1235, site is now an office building
- Condesa, Avenida Sonora 180, NE corner of Avenida Ámsterdam, site is now a mixed-use building
- Lindavista, Avenida Instituto Politécnico Nacional 1787
- Polanco at Horacio 203, now an Innovasport superstore as did Saks Fifth Avenue from 2010 to 2020.
- Perisur
- Satélite: Plaza Satélite
