= Suburbia (department store) =

Mexican department store chain

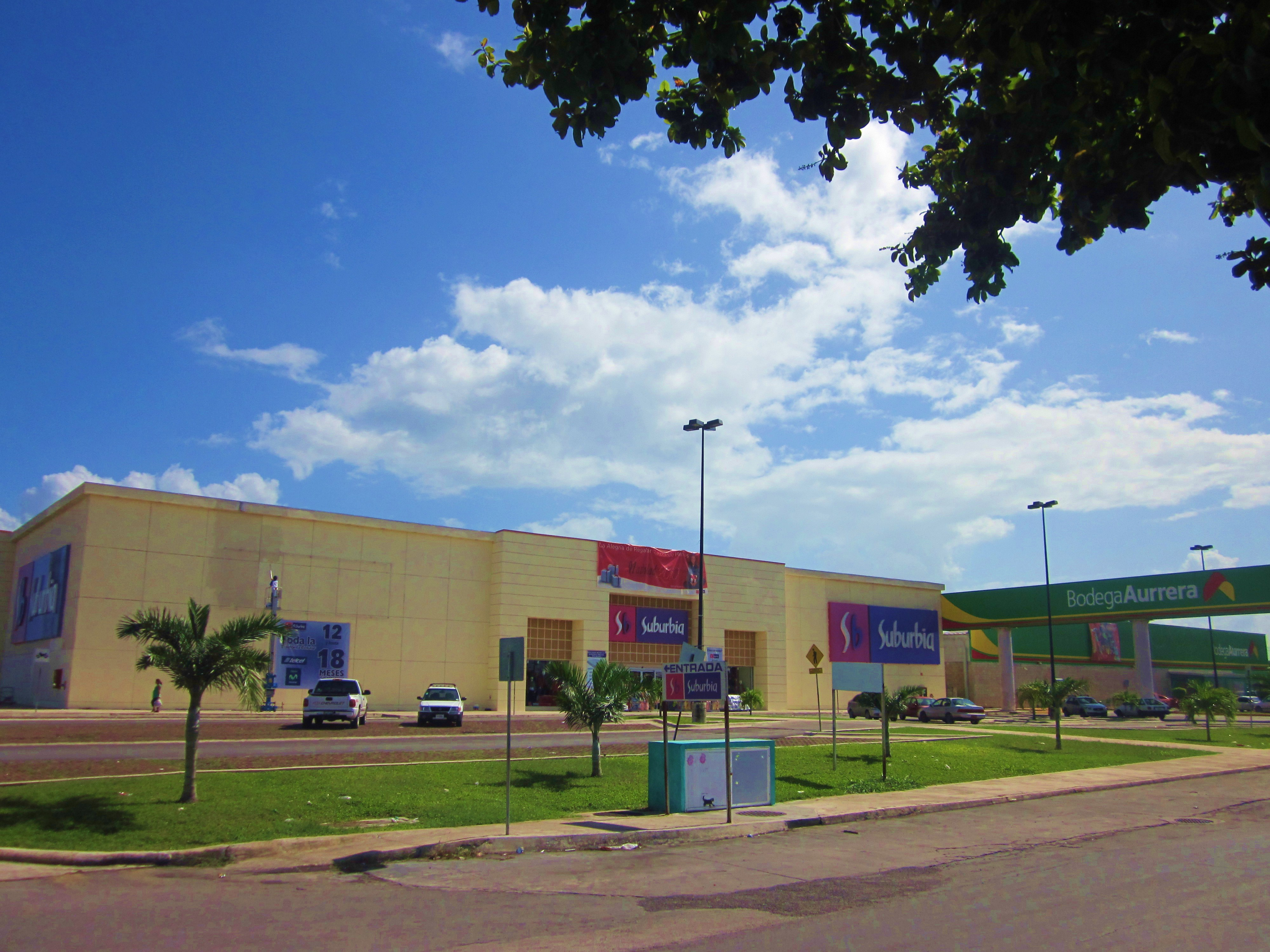
- A Suburbia department store in Chetumal
- Type: Subsidiary of El Puerto de Liverpool
- Industry: Retail
- Founded: 1970; 56 years ago
- Headquarters: Mexico City, Mexico
- Products: Clothing, Fashion clothing, footwear, jewelry, beauty products, appliances and housewares.
- Website: www.suburbia.com.mx

Suburbia is a Mexican chain of department stores now part of the El Puerto de Liverpool group and founded in 1970 in Mexico City. Its main activity consists of the sale of clothing, appliances, electronics and cell phones aimed at the middle and lower economic classes. As of December 2023, there were 180 Suburbia department stores located across Mexico.

== History ==
The first Suburbia store opened on October 28, 1970, in the Taxqueña area of southern Mexico City, as a department store for clothing, footwear and accessories for the whole family. In 1986, together with Aurrerá, Bodega Aurrerá, Superama, VIPS and El Portón, Grupo Cifra was created. In 1994, together with Vips, Suburbia joined the Cifra Walmart group (which in turn changed to Walmart de México in 2001). In 1997, Suburbia had more than 9,000 employees.

On January 18, 2016, Walmart de México announced the start of the sales process for this format, which ended when the El Puerto de Liverpool chain acquired 100% of the chain on August 10, 2016. The final closure of the operation (purchase) was carried out on March 10, 2017, when the Federal Economic Competition Commission authorized the sale. On April 4, having concluded the formalities of the transaction, the incorporation of the same to Liverpool began.

On September 12, 2018, Grupo Liverpool announced that the format Fábricas de Francia will disappear to convert the 41 stores into the Liverpool or Suburbia formats. In 2019, while 70% of Fábricas de Francia stores moved to Liverpool, the remaining 21 branches became Suburbia stores and since then, Liverpool began to expand Suburbia stores in the country, either reaching fashion malls where Liverpool is present as the main anchor, or in cities or towns with more than 70,000 inhabitants.

== Description ==
Suburbia is a department store focused on consumers located in cities from 70,000 inhabitants onwards, 180 stores across Mexico, as of December 2023, which have a sales floor area from 1,500 m2 to 6,000 m2. It handles a wide assortment of merchandise from the clothing, footwear, accessories, perfumery, cell phone, technology, toys, and recently electronics, technology, video games and furniture divisions.

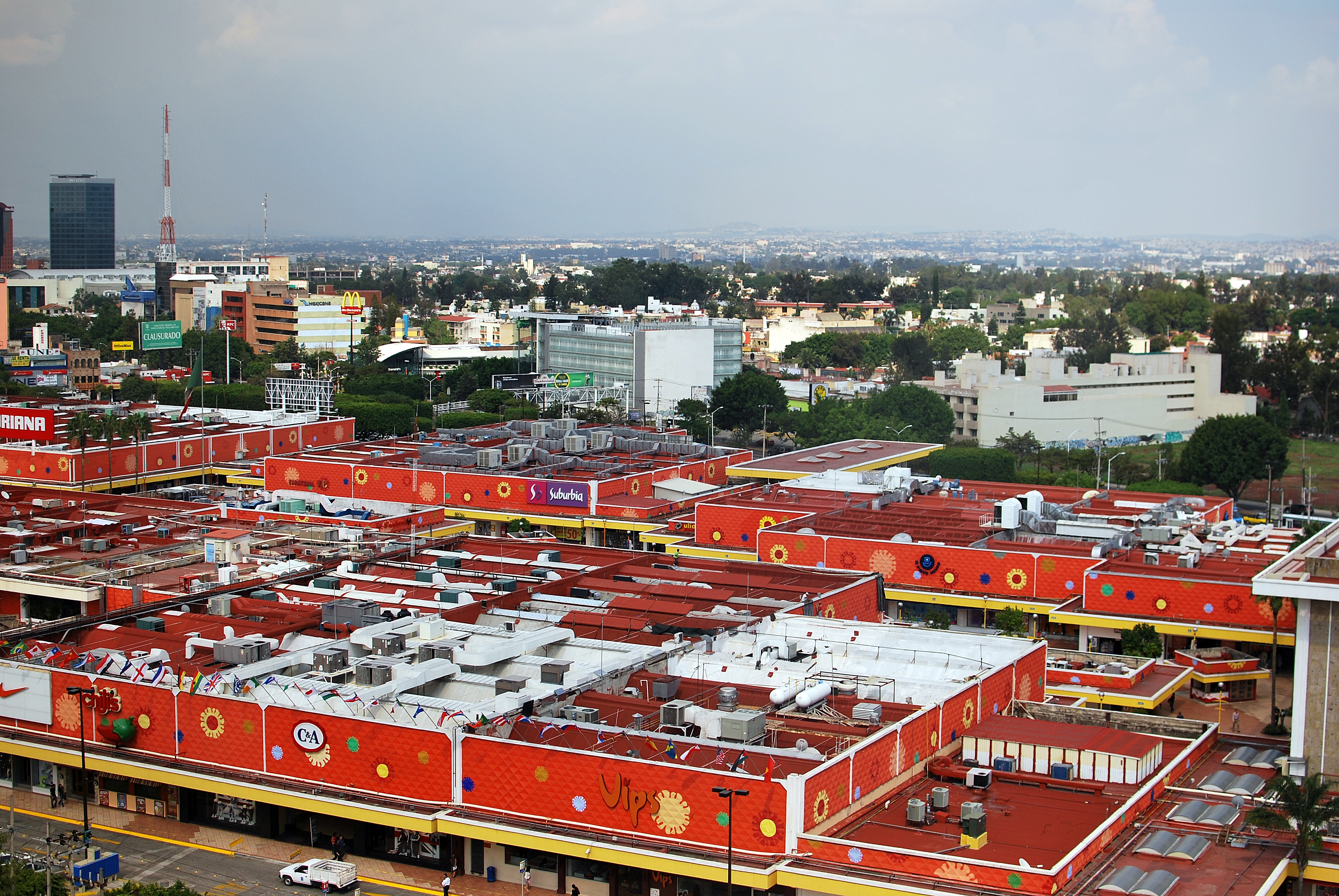
A Suburbia store in Plaza del Sol shopping mall, in Guadalajara, Jalisco

Suburbia is usually located in the historic centers of large and medium-sized cities, as well as in shopping malls for daily use, such as the community center and power center, where Suburbia acts as the main anchor for this type of shopping center for daily use, as well as acting as a sub-anchor for lifestyle centers and fashion malls (such as Plaza Mayor León in Guanajuato, Galerías Coapa in Mexico City, El Paseo Tehuacán in Puebla, Forum Tepic in Nayarit, La Gran Plaza Mazatlán in Sinaloa, Paseo Durango, Citadel in Monterrey, Altabrisa Mérida, Forum Tlaquepaque and Plaza del Sol, both in Guadalajara, among other fashion malls in Mexico).

After the administration of the Grupo Liverpool in 2019, Suburbia began to enter into recently created Mexican fashion malls (such as Paseo Querétaro, Parque Puebla, Galerías Santa Anita from Guadalajara, Jalisco, Parque Las Antenas from Mexico City, Ámbar Fashion Mall of Túxtla Gutiérrez, Sentura Zamora of Michoacan, Alaïa Guanajuato of the Guanajuato capital, Paseo Monclova of Coahuila (known as El Coloso de Coahuila), Galerías La Paz of Baja California Sur, Power Center Tecámac in México City and Galerías San Juan del Río, among others), which Suburbia acts as a sub-anchor of fashion malls.

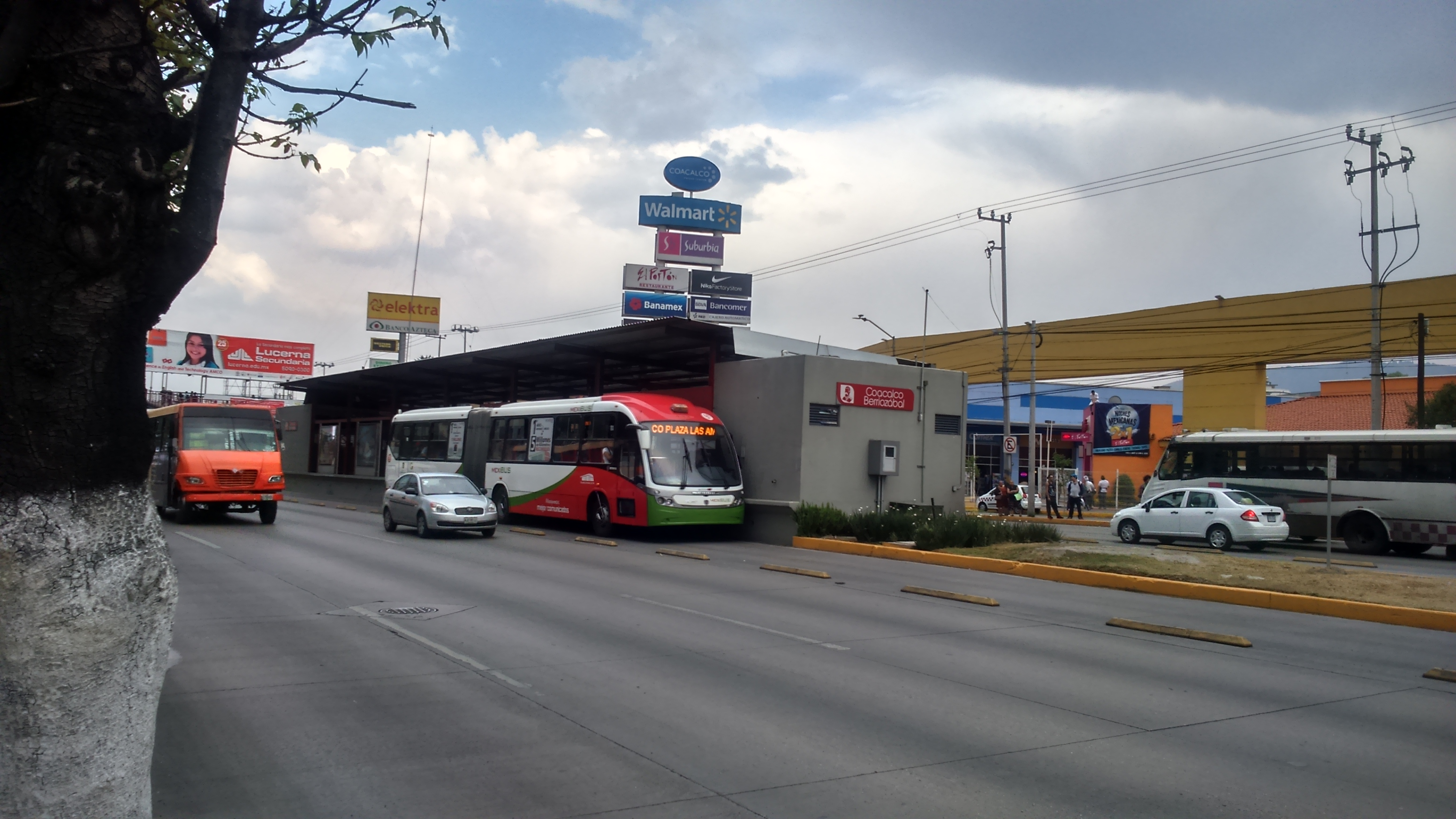
Coacalco Power Center, another shopping mall with a Suburbia store in Coacalco, México

Likewise, under said administration, the disappearance of Fábricas de Francia at the national level, caused to Suburbia also enter cities with 70,000 inhabitants or areas where it was impossible to locate a Liverpool store in two ways:

- While 70% of the Fábricas de Francia stores in the country became Liverpool stores, the Fábricas de Francia that moved to Suburbia became known as Lo Mejor de Suburbia y Fábricas de Francia juntos en una sola tienda (The Best of Suburbia and Fábricas de Francia together in one store), whose This format focused on those former Fábricas de Francia whose sales floor size, number of sales, type of shopping center and / or population size of less than 130,000 inhabitants, was counterproductive to continue as Liverpool (such as the cases of Apizaco, Tuxtepec, Uriangato, Plaza Central in Mexico City and Plaza Sendero shopping centers in the cities of Los Mochis, Tijuana and Saltillo Sur, among others).
- Also, as a result of the disappearance of the Fábricas de Francia, as of 2019 Suburbia began to enter cities of 70,000 to 300,000 inhabitants and in areas where the construction of Liverpool is impossible (commonly in new shopping malls in those cities, in the which Suburbia acts as a main anchor) such as the cases of Atlacomulco, Zitácuaro, Tizayuca, Tulancingo, Gómez Palacio and, soon Navojoa and Comalcalco, among others.

Currently, Suburbia manages three types of stores (department store, boutique and outlet store), two of which are store sub-concepts, such as Zona Suburbia and Suburbia Liquidaciones:

=== Suburbia ===
Department store created on October 28, 1970, in Mexico City (Suburbia Taxqueña), whose store format is suitable for cities with 70,000 inhabitants, which have a floor area of 1,500 to 6,000 m2. set up from 1 to 3 floors, depending on the store space. Is a department store suitable for the socioeconomic market C and D, that handle a wide assortment of merchandise from the clothing, footwear, accessories, perfumery, cell phone, technology, toys, and recently electronics, technology, video games and furniture divisions.

This store concept is regularly located in areas with a high population density (historical centers of large and medium-sized cities) as well as in shopping malls for daily use, such as community center, town center or power center, which Suburbia acts as an anchor store. Likewise, Suburbia is also usually located in fashion malls and / or lifestyle centers, in which it acts as a sub-anchor store for them.

From 1970 to 2016, it used to also be located in spaces of its former owner Walmart, located in commercial spaces or plazas where Suburbia shared the same parking lot and / or shopping center with Walmart, Bodega Aurrerá or Sam's Club. However, with the administration of the Liverpool Group, from 2017 Suburbia also began to locate in recently created shopping centers where Liverpool is present as their main anchor.

In 2019, Grupo Liverpool converted 21 Fábricas de Francia stores to Suburbia.

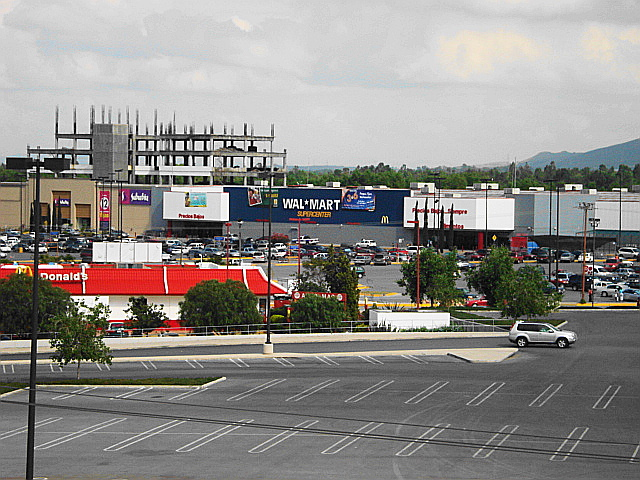
A Suburbia store in San Luis Potosí

=== Zona Suburbia ===
Sub-concept of Suburbia located in historical centers of large and medium cities through stores with a much smaller space compared to a common Suburbia department store. Basically, it is a clothing store in which it only focuses on clothing and footwear, but with a much smaller assortment and a higher turnover in department stores.

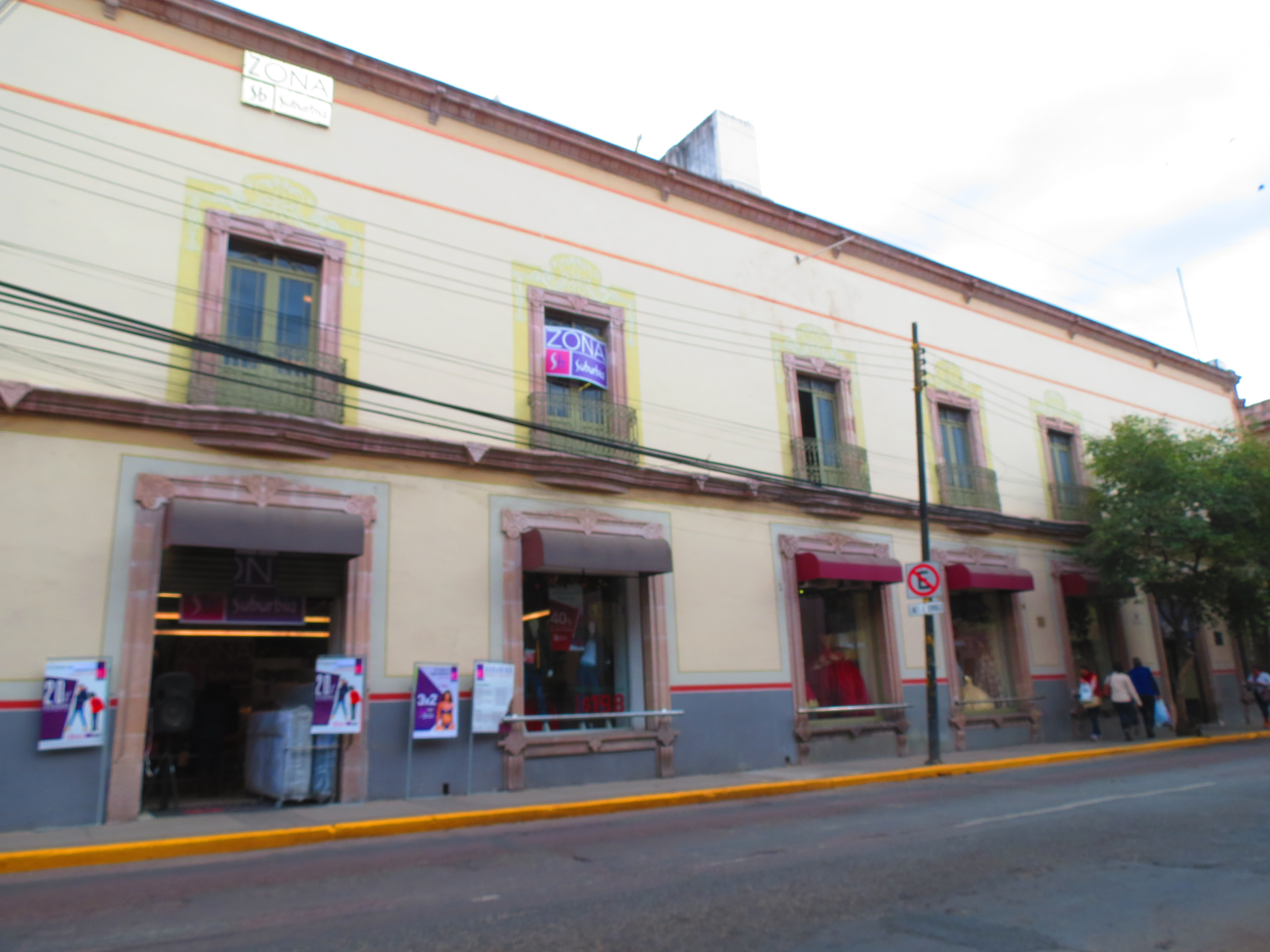
A former Zona Suburbia department store in Aguascalientes

=== Suburbia Liquidaciones ===
Suburbia sub-concept located in popular areas of large and medium-sized cities, which is the Suburbia outlet concept. Basically, it is a departmental outlet store, whose socioeconomic market, mainly, is the D, in which it handles clothing, footwear, perfumery, accessories, cell phone products in which they are subject to discounts and much more attractive prices than in traditional Suburbia stores in season of sales and offers. They are department stores with austere decor, since this concept is handled by sales and liquidations under an outlet concept.

Currently, this concept has a presence in Mexico City, Puebla, Guadalajara and Tijuana.

=== Brands and target market ===
Suburbia offers a wide selection of products but mainly its own brands such as Weekend, Non-Stop, Contempo, La Mode, Metropolis and Gianfranco Dunna focused on the population of the income levels C and D+, as defined using INEGI criteria, where A is the most affluent group.

== Slogans ==
- 1980: Su Moda está en Suburbia
- 1980–90: Navidad de Moda... Navidad Suburbia
- 1990: La moda sutil es Suburbia
- 1997: Suburbia, Moda y Calidad a tu alcance
- 1998: Suburbia, como quieres ser hoy
- 1999: Hoy es el momento Suburbia
- 2000–7: Suburbia, La Moda al Mejor Precio
- 2007–11: Sabemos que Sabes Comprar
- 2009–18: Moda para la vida real
- 2018–present: Estrena más

== Stores ==
As of December 2023, there were 180 Suburbia stores, all in Mexico. 15 Suburbia stores were branches of Fábricas de Francia before 2018, when Suburbia's owner El Puerto de Liverpool group, converted the 41 Fábricas de Francia stores to Suburbia, Liverpool format, while permanently closing four.

=== List of Fábricas de Francia stores converted to Suburbia format, 2018-9 ===
Table of Fábricas de Francia stores (2018) converted to Suburbia
Year opened as FdF	Metropolitan area	Municipality or Neighborhood	State	Mall or address	Converted to	Area (2016, sqm)
2000	Ciudad Juárez		Chih.	Rio Grande Mall	Suburbia Ciudad Juárez	6,768
2016	Los Mochis		Sin.	Plaza Sendero Los Mochis	Suburbia Los Mochis	8,873
1999	Mazatlán		Sin.	Gran Plaza Mazatlán	Suburbia Mazatlán	
2014	Mexico City	Tlalnepantla	Mexico City	Centro Lago De Guadalupe	Suburbia Lago de Guadalupe	5,087
2014	Mexico City	Iztapalapa	Mexico City	Plaza Central	Suburbia México Plaza Central	4,972
2017	Mexico City	Colonia Buenavista	Mexico City	Forum Buenavista	Suburbia México Buenavista	
2016	Mexico City	Nicolás Romero	Méx.	Town Center Vista Hermosa	Suburbia México Nicolás Romero	4,905
2015	Mexico City	Texcoco	Méx.	Puerta Texcoco	Suburbia Texcoco Puerta	4,929
2017	Mexico City	Valle de Chalco	Méx.	Patio Valle de Chalco	Suburbia Valle de Chalco	
2015	Mexico City	Zumpango	Méx.	Town Center Zumpango	Suburbia Zumpango	4,810
2017	Saltillo		Coah.	Plaza Sendero Sur	Suburbia Saltillo Sendero	5,071
2016	Tijuana	La Presa Este	B.C.	Plaza Sendero	Suburbia Tijuana	5,017
2017	Tlaxcala	Apizaco	Tlax.	Plaza Apizaco	Suburbia Apizaco	6,200
2017	Guadalajara	Tonalá	Jal.	Plaza Lomas	Suburbia Tonalá	
2016	Uriangato		Gto.	Galerías Metropolitana	Suburbia Uriangato	4,770

Source: Tiendas ("Stores"), Liverpool website and p. 43, 2022 Annual Report
