= Broadway Square Mall =

- Location: Tyler, Texas
- Coordinates: 32.2994°N 95.3026°W
- Opened: 1975
- Manager: Simon Property Group
- Owner: Simon Property Group
- Num. of stores: 83
- Num. of anchor tenants: 3
- Floor area: 628,796 sq ft (58,417.1 m^{2})
- Floors: 1
- Website: www.simon.com/mall/broadway-square

Broadway Square (also referred to as Broadway Square Mall) is a shopping mall located in Tyler, Texas. The mall primarily serves the city of Tyler and the surrounding East Texas area. It is one of two major malls in Tyler. Anchor stores are Dick's Sporting Goods, Dillard's and JCPenney.

== About the mall ==
Broadway Square Mall was first opened in 1975 with Sears, JCPenney, Selber Brothers, and Dillard's stores as anchors. Since its construction, numerous changes have been made to the mall's design. In 1987, Dillard's purchased the Selber Brothers stores at both Broadway Square and Longview Mall, converting both to auxiliary stores. The former Selber Brothers store was later closed and converted to Old Navy.

On October 4, 2018, it was announced that Sears would be closing as part of a plan to close 12 stores nationwide. The store closed in December 2018.
