= William Dillard =

William Dillard may refer to:

- William T. Dillard, American businessman, founder of the Dillard's Department Stores chain
- William T. Dillard II, American heir and businessman
- Bill Dillard, American jazz trumpeter, actor and singer
- Harrison Dillard (William Harrison Dillard), American track and field athlete

== See also ==
- William Dillard Homestead, Stone County, Arkansas
