= Grupo Cifra =

Mexican retail company

Cifra, S.A. de C.V., incorporated as Aurrerá S.A.
- Founded: 1986
- Founder: Jerónimo Arango
- Fate: acquired by Walmart in 1997. Renamed Walmart de México
- Successor: Walmart de México
- Headquarters: Blvd. Manuel Avila Camacho 647 Miguel Hidalgo 11220, Mexico City, Mexico
- Key people: Jerónimo Arango, Manuel Arango
- Products: Supermarkets, hypermarkets, department stores, restaurants
- Brands: Almacenes Aurrerá, Bodega Aurrerá, Superama, VIPS, El Portón, Bon Savor, Fratti
- Revenue: US$4.6 billion (1994)
- Number of employees: 39,934 (1994)

Grupo Cifra or Grupo Aurrerá-Cifra was a Mexican company, owned by Jerónimo Arango and his brother Manuel Arango, founded in 1986, whose main component businesses were supermarket chains Aurrerá and Superama, restaurant chains VIPS (Mexican restaurant) and El Portón, department storesSuburbia and others such as El Gran Bazar, BONS, Fratti and Bon Savor. The Group ceased to exist in 2000 as it became part of Walmart.

== History ==
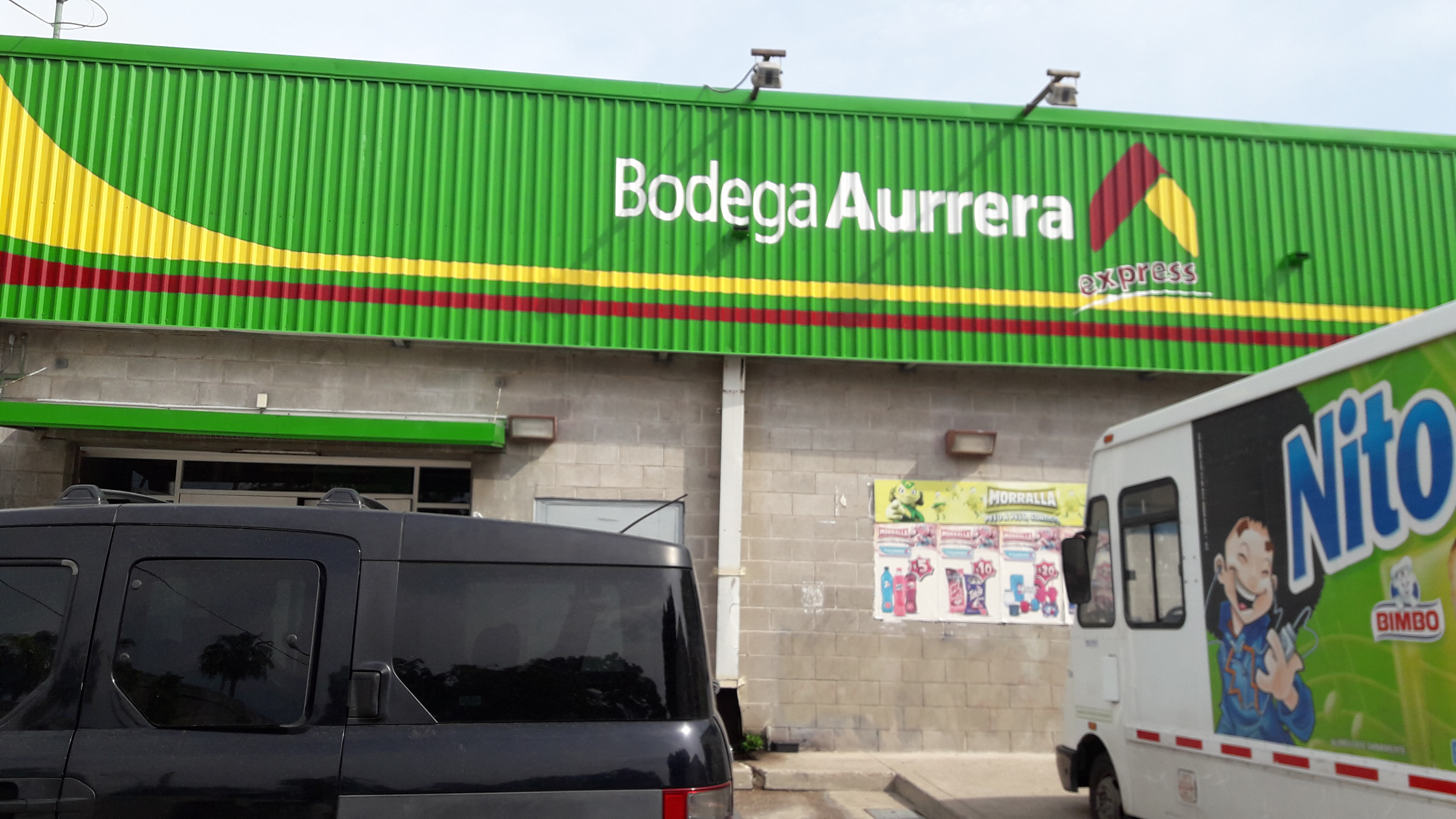
A Bodega Aurrerá store

Cifra, S.A. de C.V. was at one time Mexico's largest retailer, and its second largest publicly owned company, and, according to a 1993 Euromoney survey, Latin America's best-run company. Among Mexican retailers Cifra was the first to be publicly owned, offer generic brands, and include clothing, food, and hardware within a single store.

Cifra was founded in 1958 by Jerónimo Arango. The son of a Spanish immigrant to Mexico who prospered in the textile business, Arango spent his youth studying art and literature in the U.S. and traveling there and in Spain and in Mexico. While in New York City he saw a crowd waiting patiently for the opportunity to enter E.J. Korvette, a pioneer discount department store located in the old Saks Fifth Avenue-34th Street store. Impressed by Korvette's success, he persuaded his father to lend him the equivalent US$240,000 to open a similar store with his two brothers, Plácido and Manuel. Called Aurrera Bolĺvar, the discount store opened in downtown Mexico City in 1958.

Like Korvette's, Aurrerá Bolivar was an immediate success and drew resentment from established retailers, who felt threatened by competition by the newcomer with its low prices, around 20% less than manufacturers's list prices, in contrast to existing retailers who sold around 40–45% higher than list price. Soon the Arangos had to locate alternative suppliers in other parts of the country because the original ones were afraid of their other customers, rivals of Aurrerá, boycotting them. Aurrerá exposed it rivals' tactics during its sponsorship of the popular television show The 64,000 Peso Question. By 1965 there were eight Aurrerá stores doing US$16 million in sales. The company's first Superama supermarket opened in 1960 and the first Vip restaurant (later VIPS) in 1964.

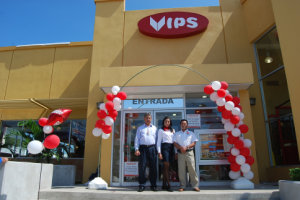
A Vips restaurant

The Cifra empire had become vast by the mid-1990s, including department stores, discount warehouse stores, supermarkets, hypermarkets, and restaurants. More than three-quarters of its locations were in Greater Mexico City, which was the largest metropolitan area in Latin America and was Mexico's largest and fastest-growing region. But Cifra was to expand to the next level.

By 1991, Arango's Cifra partnered with Walmart to bring its two store formats to Mexico: Walmart Supercenters, and membership-based warehouse club Sam's Club. The same year the first Sam's Club opened in Polanco, Mexico City, under the new Cifra-Walmart joint venture. In 1992 the first Walmart store opened in Plaza Oriente, Mexico City. Cifra-Walmart was renamed Walmex and became the starting point for Walmart's expansion in Mexico. In 1997, Walmart purchased all shares of Grupo Cifra.

In this first step of Walmart in Mexico, begins to open more branches by all the Mexican republic under the name "Walmart Supercenter", with this begins the disappearance of Group Enciphers. In 1998 the group launched the format Bodega Aurrerá, stores smaller than Almacenes Aurrerá and which were very different to Walmart and Aurrerá. In 2000 the groupchanged its name to Walmart de México and a year later all the Aurrerá stores were converted to Walmart Supercenters leaving Bodega Aurrerá as the only other store format.

== Formats ==
Aurrerá: Mainly it was the first and only format created by the Arango brothers themselves, founded in 1958 on Simón Bolivar street, hypermarket chain with more than 40 branches in Mexico.

Superama: supermarket chain that launched on Homero street in Polanco, Mexico City. Slightly more affluent consumer target, but still mainstream. Smaller-scale stores than Aurrerá which fit in urban neighborhoods.

Suburbia: department store with a focus on apparel at value prices.

Vips: founded in 1968 along the lines of an American diner, Denny's, etc. with the idea that clients could enjoy a quick meal after shopping at Aurrerá.

El Portón: full-service restaurant serving Mexican cuisine in a more traditional restaurant environment than somewhat diner-style VIPs.

Fratti: ice cream parlor with branches in Tepeyac, Toreo, Plaza Universidad and Satellite, usually located inside Aurrerá and Suburbia stores.

Bon Savor: ice cream parlour with branches exclusively inside Almacenes Aurrerá stores, but unlike Fratti, Bon Savor was more of a café or coffee house concept.

El Gran Bazar: a cross between a department store and supermarket, with an emphases on imported food, furniture or home appliances.

The format was terminated in 1995 after opening only two branches, both in Mexico City.

BONS: after the failure of the Gran Bazar concept, Cifra launched this second supermarket-department store mix, with little variety and only ever opening 5 branches, all around Mexico City.
