= Parque Las Antenas =

Shopping mall in Mexico, Mexico

- Parque Las Antenas in 2020

- Location within Mexico City urban area
- area map

General information
- Location: Anillo Periférico #3278. Col. La Esperanza, Iztapalapa, Mexico City, Mexico
- Coordinates: 19°18′48″N 99°4′32″W
- Inaugurated: 7 June 2018
- Cost: MX$5,000,000,000
- Owner: Fibra Danhos

Technical details
- Size: 850,000 m^{2} (9,100,000 sq ft) (rental area)

Other information
- Number of stores: 230
- Public transit: Periférico Oriente metro station

Website
- parquelasantenas.com.mx

Parque Las Antenas is a shopping mall in Iztapalapa, along Anillo Periférico, the outer ring road of Mexico City. It is noted for having an amusement park on the roof named ¡Kataplum!, becoming the only shopping center in Latin America to have this feature.

Parque Las Antenas began construction in 2016. The shopping mall is owned by the corporate Fibra Danhos, and opened on 7 June 2018. The building has a rental area of 850,000 square meters (9,100,000 sq ft), with space for 230 stores, including Liverpool, Sears, Walmart, Cinépolis, H&M and multiple Alsea restaurants.

== Amusement park ==
¡Kataplum! is owned by a different company, also named ¡Kataplum!, which also contributed to the investement costs. Rides include Insomnio, a suspended roller coaster that extends beyond the perimeter of Parque Las Antenas's facade; Las Nubes, a swing ride that rises up to 65 meters (213 ft) above the ground; or Patatús, a 360-degree pendulum ride.

The area where Parque Las Antenas lies sinks between 2 and 10 centimeters (0.8 and 3.9 inches) per year. According to José Márquez, ¡Kataplum!'s operations manager, this was taken into account during the planning of the shopping center. Additionally, because the rides at the park generate additional weight and vibrations, and because Mexico City is in a seismically active area, the shopping center was built with foundations twice as large as those typically used for shopping centers of a similar size. Márquez believes this creates a sense of fear among visitors and noted that, due to the site's layout, there are no designated earthquake meeting points, as is customary in civil protection plans; instead, only lower-risk areas have been marked. He also indicated that emergency protocols are in place for the evacuation of up to 8,000 visitors. ¡Kataplum! has its own weather station, which monitors wind gusts and temperatures to ensure that conditions remain within acceptable limits for park operations.
