= Longview Mall =

- Location: Longview, Texas, United States
- Coordinates: 32.5390°N 94.7509°W
- Address: 3500 McCann Road
- Opened: August 14, 1978
- Developer: Melvin Simon & Associates
- Owner: Dillard's & Trademark Property
- Num. of stores: 70+
- Floor area: 638,000 sq ft (59,300 m^{2})
- Floors: 1 (2 in former Sears)
- Website: longviewmall.com

Longview Mall is an enclosed shopping mall in Longview, Texas. It opened in 1978.

== History ==
The original anchors of Longview Mall were Sears, Bealls, J. C. Penney, Dillard's, H. J. Wilson Co. (later Service Merchandise), The Martin Twin Theater and Selber Brothers. In 1987, Selber Brothers sold its locations at Longview and Broadway Square Mall to Dillard's, who converted both to separate men's clothing stores.

The Martin Twin was opened May 18, 1978. Each screen had 350 seats. Carmike later operated the theatre as the Mall Twin Cinema until its closing on August 28, 1997. The space is now occupied by FaithFlip .

In 2004, Bealls relocated to the former Service Merchandise building. The original Bealls became a miniature golf course.

Dillard's expanded its original store in 2006, resulting in the closure of the menswear store in the former Selber Brothers. The expansion made the 143,000 square foot Dillard's the largest one-story location in the chain. The former Selber Brothers space remained vacant until it became L'Patricia in 2012. In 2020, the space became vacant until July 2023, when a bargain bin-type store opened in its place.

In 2016, a $16 million renovation began at Longview Mall, adding stores and amenities. BJ's Brewhouse built a new restaurant in the mall parking lot and On the Border constructed a freestanding restaurant as well. A Dick's Sporting Goods was constructed in the original Bealls location.

In February 2017, H&M opened its first East Texas store inside the mall. It is located near the mall's main entrance in the space formerly occupied by Piccadilly Cafeteria which closed in the mid 1990s.

In March 2018, the mall owner bought the Sears store for possible redevelopment, in the event Sears closed its store.

On November 8, 2018, Sears announced the closing of this location in February 2019 as part of a plan to close 40 stores nationwide.

In late 2021, a new store called EntertainMART opened in the space previously occupied by Payless Shoes Source on the front side of the mall beside the Hallmark.

As of February 2022, the old Sears building has been redeveloped into two separate stores, a Conn's HomePlus and a HomeGoods. The L'Patricia store has relocated to the old Stage store location. Pro-Comp Martial Arts Center and D-BAT also occupy the space.

In 2025, Dillard's and Trademark Property purchased the mall.

In 2026, new stores were announced at the mall. Barnes and Noble projects their store to open in spring 2027. Plans show the Dillard's store is to be expanded to add a new Dillard's Men's Store.
