= Dillard's =

American department store chain

Dillard's, Inc.

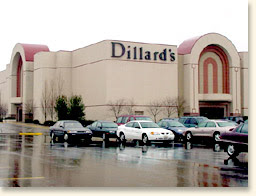
- Dillard's built in 1994 at Southern Park Mall.
- Type: Public
- Traded as: NYSE: DDS (Class A); Russell 1000 component
- Industry: Retail
- Genre: Department stores
- Founded: 1938; 88 years ago in Mineral Springs, Arkansas, United States
- Founder: William T. Dillard
- Headquarters: Little Rock, Arkansas, United States
- Number of locations: 271 (2025)
- Area served: United States (Note: Dillard's operates in 30 states, however, is absent from the Northeast, most of the Upper Midwest, most of the West Coast, Alaska, and Hawaii.)
- Key people: William T. Dillard II (chairman and CEO); Alex Dillard (president)
- Products: Clothing; footwear; bedding; bath; furniture; decor; jewelry; accessories; beauty products; appliances; housewares
- Revenue: ▼US$6.474 billion (2025)
- Operating income: ▼US$694.5 million (2025)
- Net income: ▼US$570.2 million (2025)
- Total assets: ▼US$3.505 billion (2025)
- Total equity: ▼US$1.779 billion (2025)
- Number of employees: approx. 28,800 (2025)
- Website: dillards.com

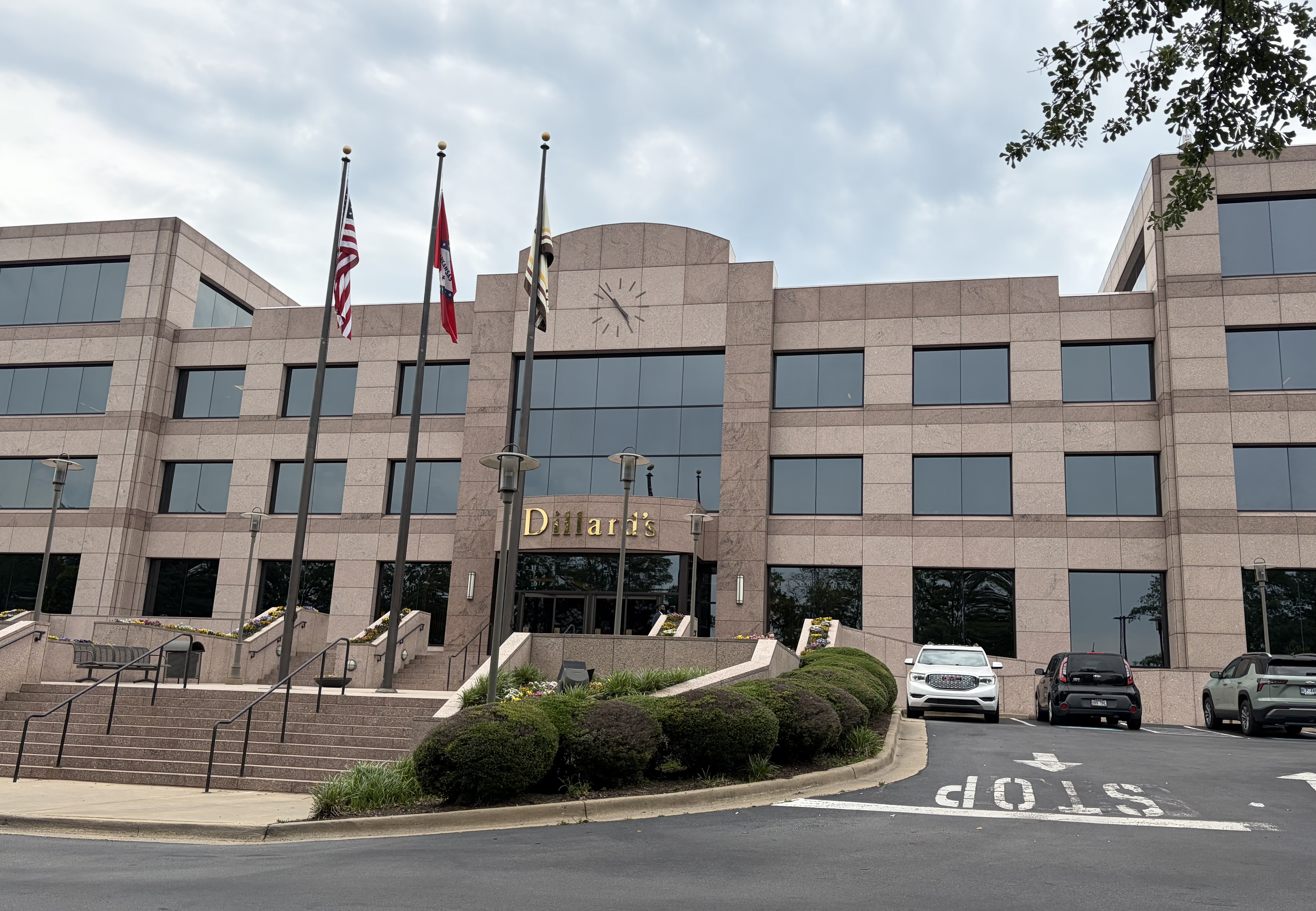
The headquarters of the Dillard's corporation in Little Rock, Arkansas

Dillard's, Inc. is an American department store chain founded in 1938 by William T. Dillard. It is headquartered in Little Rock, Arkansas, and operates approximately 271 stores in 30 states. Currently, the largest number of stores are located in Texas with 54 and Florida with 40.

== History ==
=== 20th century ===
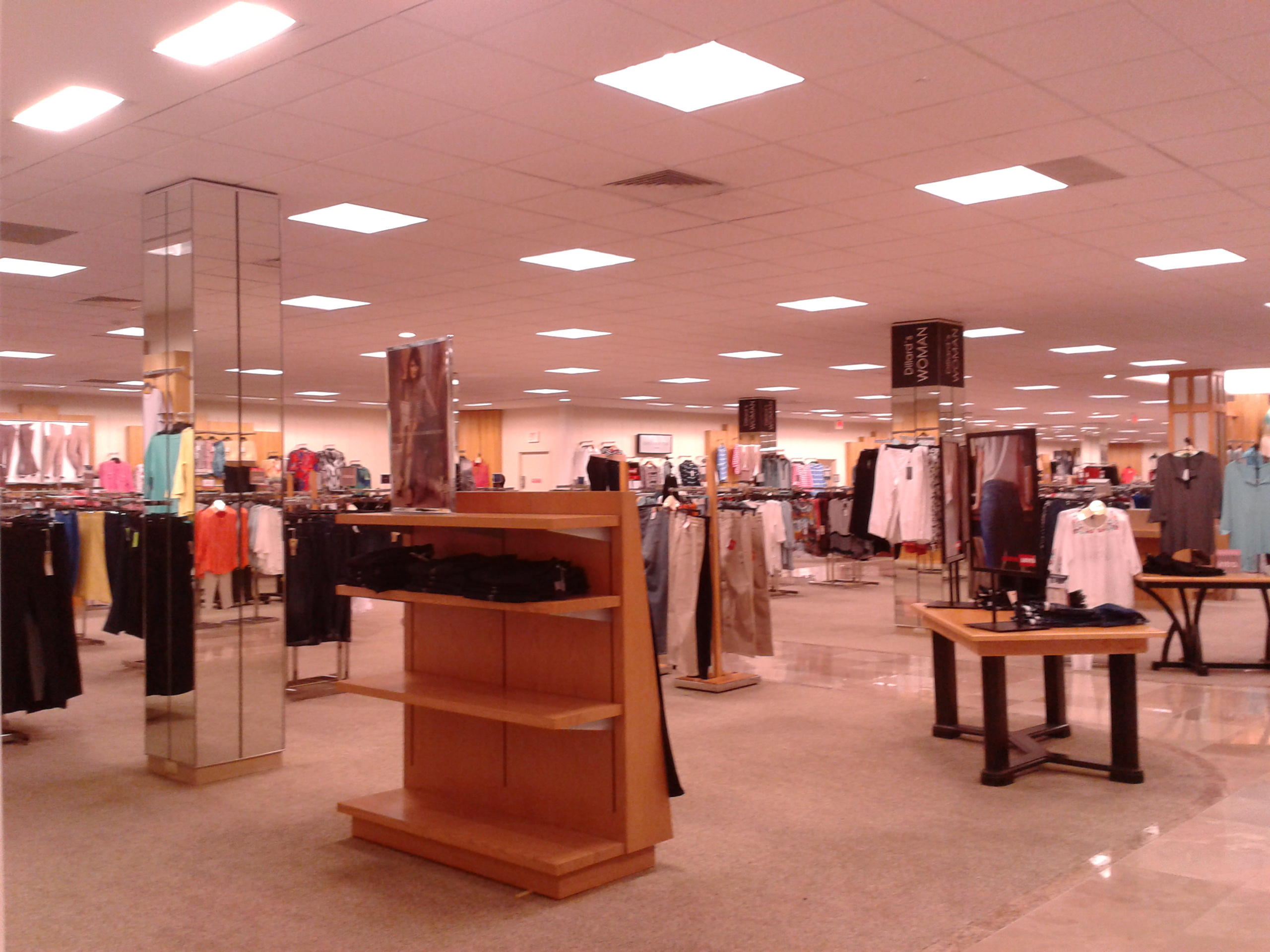
Interior of a now-relocated Dillard's store, at Four Seasons Town Centre in Greensboro, North Carolina

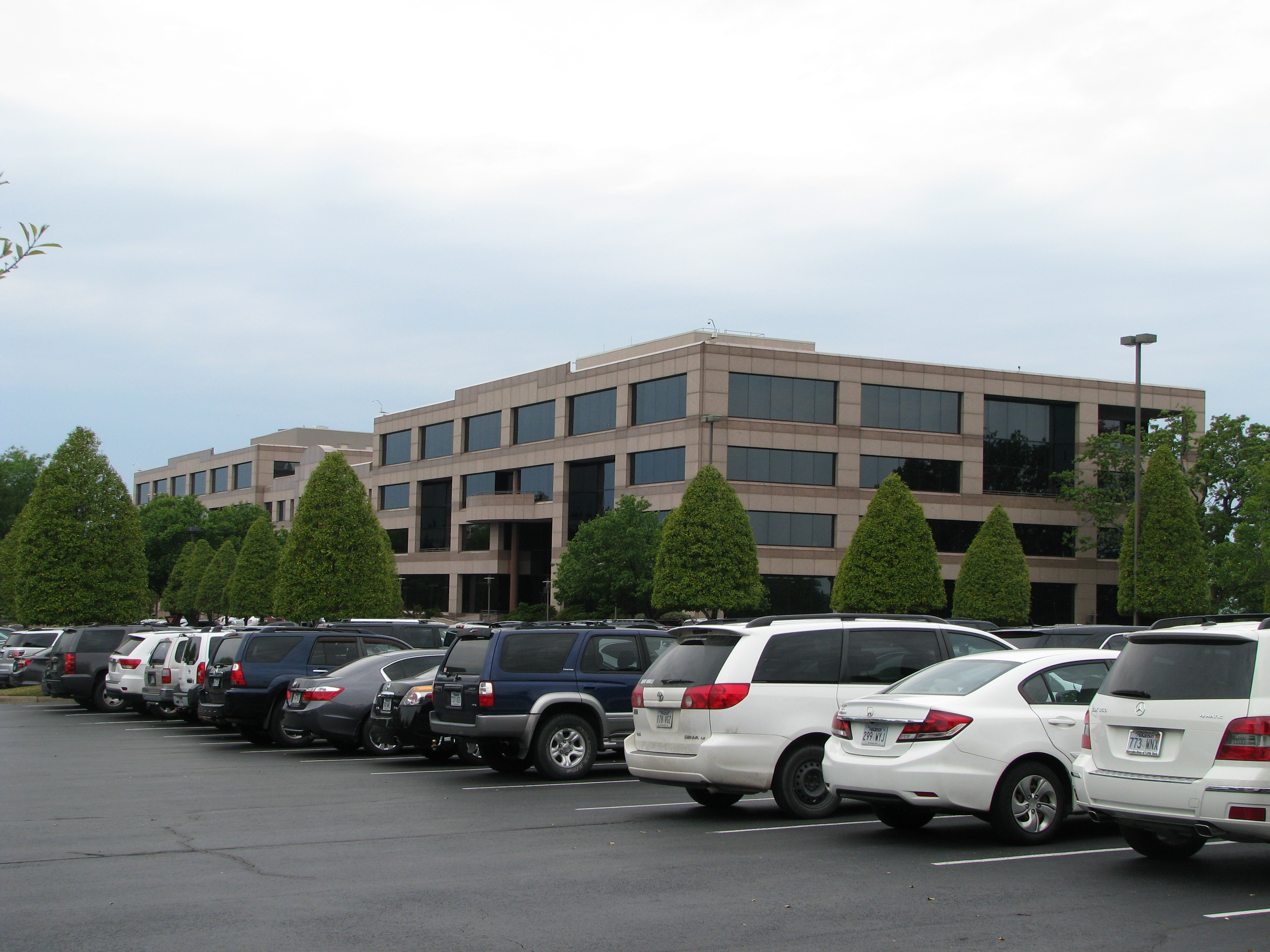
Dillard's Headquarters Building in Little Rock, Arkansas

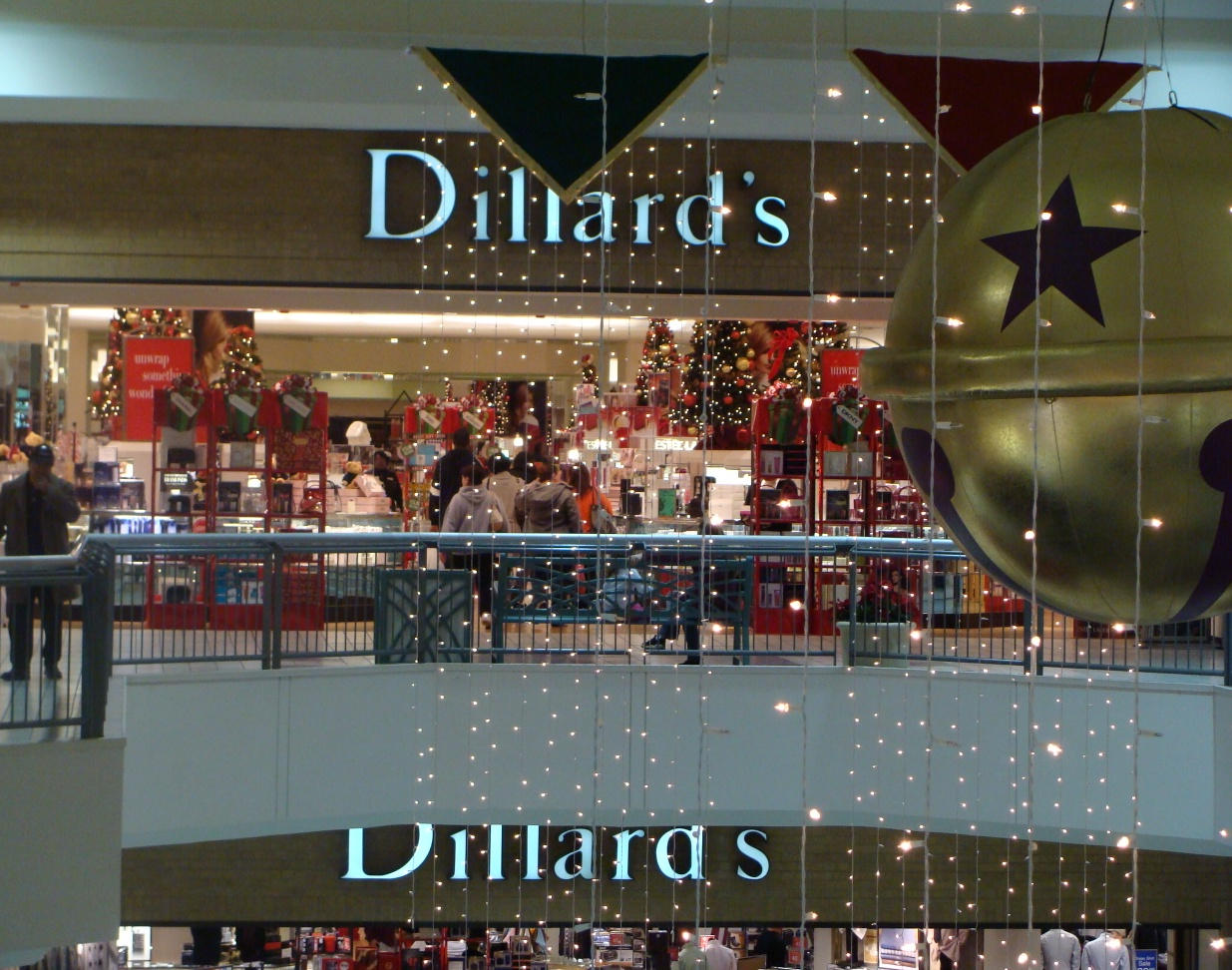
Dillard's during the Christmas shopping season at Ingram Park Mall in San Antonio, Texas

Dillard's is the outgrowth of a department store founded in 1938 by William T. Dillard; its corporate headquarters remain located at the eastern edge of Little Rock's Riverdale area and many of its executives and directors are members of the Dillard family. The family retains control of the company through its ownership of Class B Common Stock; the Class A common stock is publicly traded on the New York Stock Exchange. Dillard began his first store in Mineral Springs, Arkansas, in what was locally known as "the tater house". It was located across the street from the community's Methodist church. The building that housed the original store was torn down in the early 2000s. Dillard sold the original five and dime store in Nashville, Arkansas, to develop a department store in Texarkana, Arkansas, initially as the minority partner in Wooten & Dillard. In 1956, Dillard led an investment group that acquired the Mayer & Schmidt store in Tyler, Texas. This store eventually took on the name "Dillard's Mayer & Schmidt" until 1974, when it was replaced with a mall-based location south of downtown Tyler.

During the 1960s, Dillard's acquired several failing stores as a means of expansion. In 1964, the company established its headquarters in Little Rock. The company's stock went public in 1969, as "Dillard Department Stores, Inc."

During the 1970s, Dillard's experienced significant growth by positioning itself as an anchor store in suburban shopping malls. The company's expansion strategy included acquiring smaller regional chains and assuming control of locations that had been unprofitable under previous ownership. Much of this growth during the decade was concentrated in newly constructed malls within smaller cities in Texas.

In 1971, five Texas units were acquired from Fedway, a division of Federated Department Stores; the stores were rebranded as Dillard's in 1972. In 1974, five Leonard's stores were acquired in Fort Worth, and a commitment to open a new downtown Fort Worth store at the Tandy Center, the site of the original Leonard's. Also in 1974, the former Brown-Dunkin, Blass, Pfeifer and Mayer & Schmidt stores were fully renamed Dillard's.

In the 1980s, the company purchased many local chains. In 1982, Dillard's leased three units of the defunct Lowenstein's chain in Memphis, Tennessee. In early 1984, Dillard's acquired 12 Stix, Baer & Fuller stores in St. Louis and Kansas City from Associated Dry Goods Corp. In fall 1984, two department store divisions were purchased from Dayton-Hudson Corporation: Diamond's and John A. Brown, with locations in Arizona, Nevada and Oklahoma. Twelve stores in Kansas and Missouri belonging to R. H. Macy & Co.'s Midwest Division, which was later dissolved in 2006, were acquired in early 1986, while the three-unit Hemphill-Wells company in West Texas was purchased in the summer. The stores at Sunset Mall in San Angelo and South Plains Mall in Lubbock were both converted, and the third in downtown Lubbock was closed.

In 1987, Dillard's purchased 26 of Joske's 27 stores in Texas and Arizona and the four-unit Cain-Sloan chain in Nashville, Tennessee, from Allied Stores Corp. This deal gave Dillard's two major anchor locations at several malls in Texas and Arizona with many of the second locations being converted to a separate, expanded home and men's stores, a format that Dillard's utilized greatly, both to grow its store size cost-effectively and to prevent competitors from gaining valuable real estate. Additionally, the Joske's acquisition gave Dillard's entry into the Houston market. That same year, Dillard's co-founded CDI Contractors, a construction company that would help build, remodel, and repair most of its locations, with William "Bill" Clark and Braggs Electric Construction Company.

Dillard's in 1988 acquired the former Selber Bros. clothing department store chain, founded in 1907 in Shreveport, Louisiana, which also had a few locations in Texas.

In 1988, Dillard's purchased the three-unit Miller & Paine chain in Lincoln, Nebraska, as well as a half-interest and operational control of The Higbee Co., based in Cleveland, Ohio, with partner Edward J. DeBartolo Corp. D. H. Holmes Co., Ltd., of New Orleans, was purchased in 1989, bringing 18 units primarily in Louisiana, as well two former Diamond's units in Tucson, Arizona.

The Ivey's chain of 23 stores in Florida, North Carolina and South Carolina was acquired from BATUS in 1990. This was followed by Maison Blanche selling seven stores on Florida's Gulf Coast to them in 1991. The locations were at Tyrone Square Mall, University Square Mall, WestShore Plaza, Countryside Mall, Southgate Plaza, Edison Mall, and Coastland Center. In 1992, the remaining interest in the Higbee's stores was acquired, as well as five Ohio stores from Horne's (as part of a legal settlement, Dillard's having canceled a 1988 deal to acquire the chain). The five stores were located at Southern Park Mall, Great Lakes Mall, Severence Town Center, Westgate Center, and Randall Park Mall. All five locations opened as Dillard's in August 1992.

Also in 1992, three stores from the Hess's chain liquidation, two Thalhimer's in South Carolina and Tennessee, and three Belk-Lindsey stores in Florida were acquired by the company. Except for two Belk of Columbia stores that were acquired in 1995, acquisitions were eschewed for a couple of years until early 1997 with the purchase of 15 stores—10 Mervyn's boxes in Florida and five southern Virginia stores from Proffitt's that were acquired from Hess's in 1993.

In 1994, an agreement was signed between Dillard's, Wal-Mart and Cifra to open up to 50 stores in Mexico under the Dillard's nameplate, with six stores set to open in 1995 and 1996. The first store would have been located at Plaza Fiesta San Agustin, however, it never opened.

The deal-making culminated with the purchase of Mercantile Stores Co., Inc., in 1998. The purchase of this Fairfield, Ohio-based department store company brought several chains, including Bacon's, Castner Knott, de Lendrecie's, Gayfers, Glass Block, Hennessy's, J.B. White, Joslins, Lion Store, Maison Blanche, McAlpin's, Root's and The Jones Store. Dillard's sold 26 stores of the former Mercantile Stores to May Department Stores Co. and Saks Incorporated and traded an additional seven stores to Belk for nine of theirs in southern Virginia and Chattanooga, Tennessee.

Also in 1998, the chain entered California, opening its first store in a former Weinstock's at Weberstown Mall in Stockton, California. In 1999, Dillard's opened stores at Mall of Georgia and Arbor Place Mall near Atlanta.

=== 21st century ===
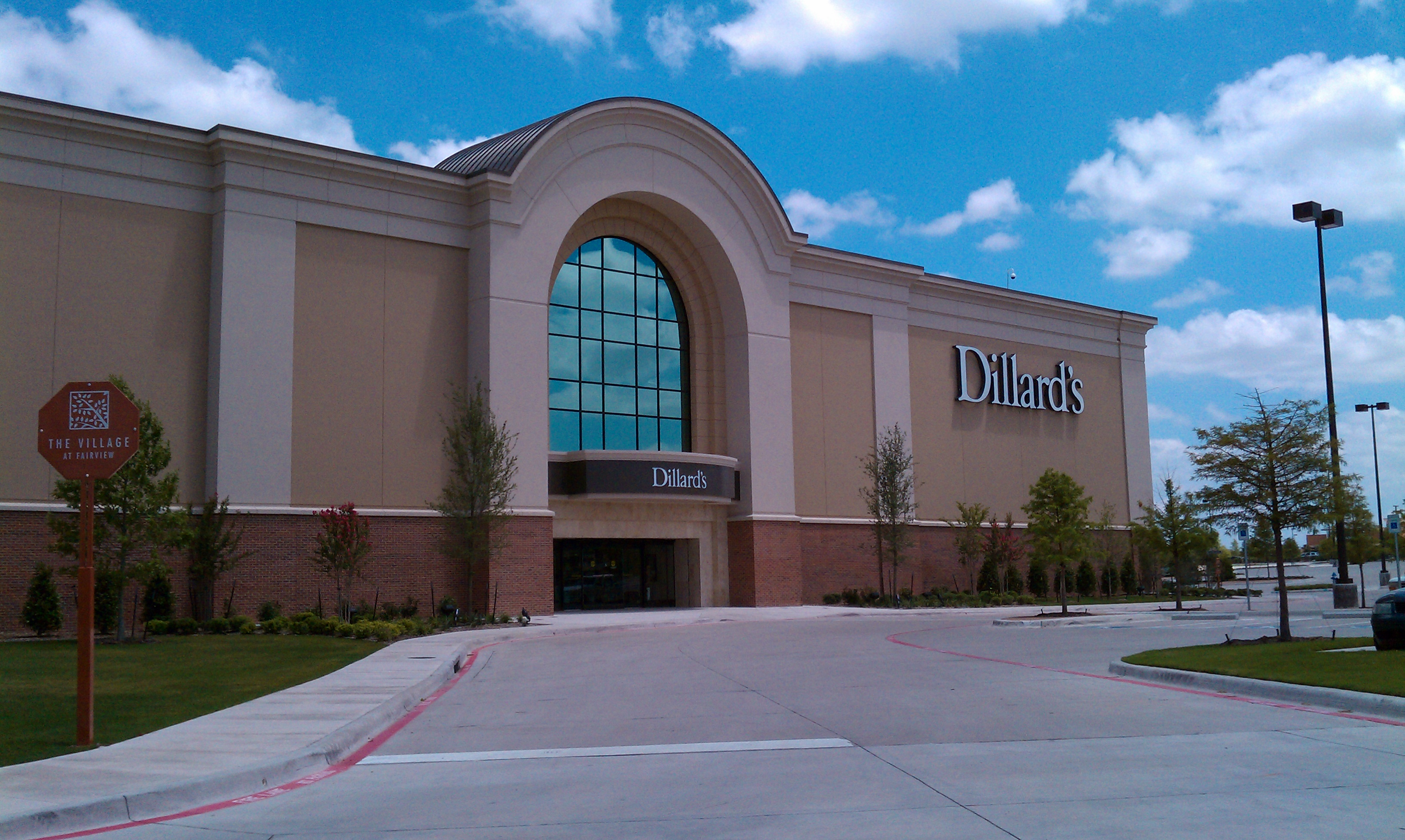
Dillard's in Fairview, Texas opened on March 10, 2010

After the acquisition of Mercantile, Dillard's largely ceased expanding through acquisitions, although eight locations of the defunct Montgomery Ward in the Midwest, and four locations from ZCMI in Utah and Idaho were acquired in 2001.

In 2004, Dillard's store credit card operation, operated as Dillard's National Bank, was sold to GE Money Bank.

In 2005, Dillard's opened stores at Atlantic Station in Atlanta, Georgia as well as St. Johns Town Center in Jacksonville, Florida, and a store at Imperial Valley Mall in El Centro, California.

In November 2005, Dillard’s bought a McRaes location in Mall of Louisiana.

In 2008, Dillard's closed its travel agency, Dillard's Travel, alongside all in-store locations due to economic conditions. Dillard's Travel previously operated in 43 of the 318 stores. Also in 2008, stores opened at both The Shops at Wiregrass and Pier Park in Florida. Dillard's also announced that it had completed a transaction to acquire the remaining fifty percent (50%) interest in CDI Contractors, LLC and CDI Contractors, Inc., which it did not already own.

In 2014, Dillard's announced a partnership with Bourbon & Boots, also based in Little Rock, to launch a line of Southern-themed products for sale in stores.

In late 2018, Dillard's announced a location would open in fall 2019 in Sioux Falls, South Dakota, at the site of the former Younkers in Empire Mall.

By August 2020, it had not yet opened. In September 2019, Dillard's remained headquartered in Arkansas, with 260 "full-line" stores and 29 clearance centers. It had locations mostly in the South and Southwest of the United States, in 29 states overall. The company was also a significant owner of property in the United States, and it owned 44,300,000 square feet (4,120,000 m^{2}) of the 49,000,000 square feet (4,600,000 m^{2}) it used for its business and retail operations.

In March 2020, Dillard's attracted note in the press for keeping many of its 290 stores open during the coronavirus pandemic, with Dillard's stating "we are open with limited hours where not ordered to close by state or local government mandate."

In April 2020, Dillard's closed around 200 out of its 285 stores in response to COVID-19. Its online store remained open. In May 2020, Dillard's had reopened all but two of its locations in Tampa Bay, according to its website at the time. That week, management and Dillard's CEO, William Dillard II, informed its annual meeting that the company's first quarter had been the worst in its history, due to the coronavirus, saying Dillard's business had become "total chaos" by the end of April as a result. At the time, Dillard's had 257 department stores, and 28 clearance stores, and had reopened stores in 21 states or more.

In August 2021, the company released its second quarter report. It did not release "store comps relative to pandemic-dominated 2020; comparable store retail sales compared to 2019 rose 14%." After an $8.6 million net loss in August 2020, the company noted that it instead had made a net income in August 2021 of $185.7 million.

For 2023 (for the 53 weeks ending 3 February 2024), Dillard's net income was $738.8 million. Net sales for the same period were $6.75 billion. Operating expenses to 3 February 2024 were $1.77 billion.

On January 29, 2024 Dillard's announced an agreement with Citibank and Mastercard that would replace existing customer credit card accounts. A new co-branded Mastercard replaced the existing co-branded credit card alongside an alternative private label card and new loyalty program activities. In March of 2024, Dillard's opened its first location in the upper midwest in Sioux Falls, South Dakota, in the Empire Mall.

In 2024, the company introduced "The Coterie Shop" a concept of online and conventional special occasion and casual clothing shops from Abbey Glass, Buru, Crosby by Mollie Burch and Fanm Mon. The Coterie Shop will be featured in Alabama, Arkansas, Arizona, Florida, Georgia, Kentucky, Louisiana, North Carolina, Oklahoma, South Carolina, Tennessee and Texas.

In a partnership with Trademark Property, Dillard's purchased Longview Mall in Longview, Texas in 2025.

Dillard's announced the closure of its store in Plano, Texas in 2025. It was reported as closed in 2026.

Throughout the retail apocalypse, Dillard's fiscal health has fluctuated, with a sharp decline during the pandemic, followed by a rebound. It has stayed more stable than many other retail brands, such as Macy's or Nordstrom, though it is still volatile.

== Store formats ==
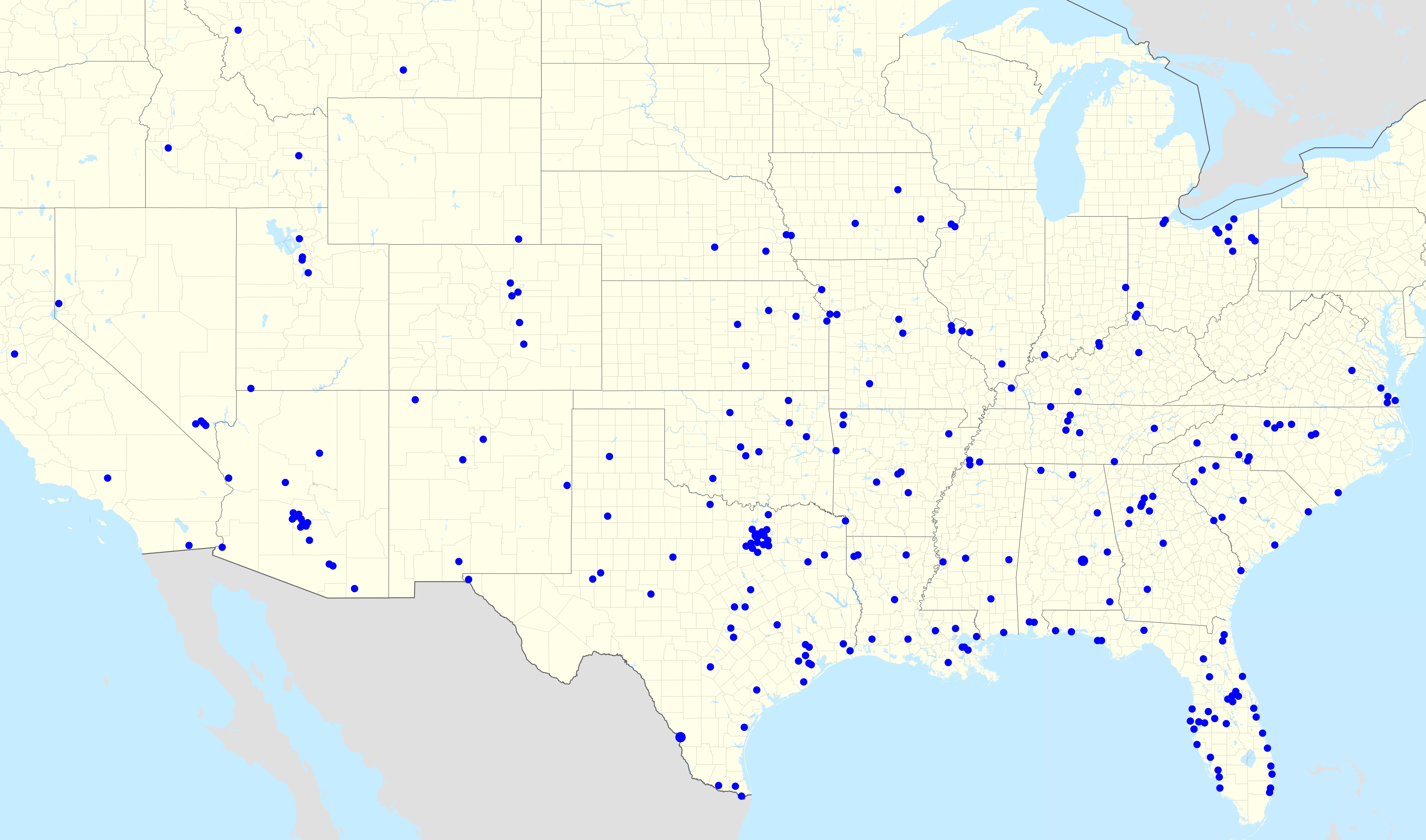
Map of Dillard's locations in the United States

The chain continues to expand and has recently added stores in non-traditional mall shopping centers. Currently, the largest Dillard's store at 365,000 square feet (33,900 m^{2}) is located at Scottsdale Fashion Square, an enclosed super-regional mall in Scottsdale, Arizona. Within the Dallas/Fort Worth area, the chain has two "flagship" stores with a 299,000-square-foot (27,800 m^{2}) store at the Northpark Center in Dallas and a 310,000-square-foot (29,000 m^{2}) store at the North East Mall in Hurst. Its flagship store in the East Coast region, at 260,000 square feet (24,000 m^{2}), was located in the MacArthur Center in downtown Norfolk, Virginia, closed in 2023. A new 220,000 square feet (20,000 m^{2}) "flagship" store opened at the South Plains Mall in Lubbock, Texas on October 10, 2024.

=== Clearance Centers ===
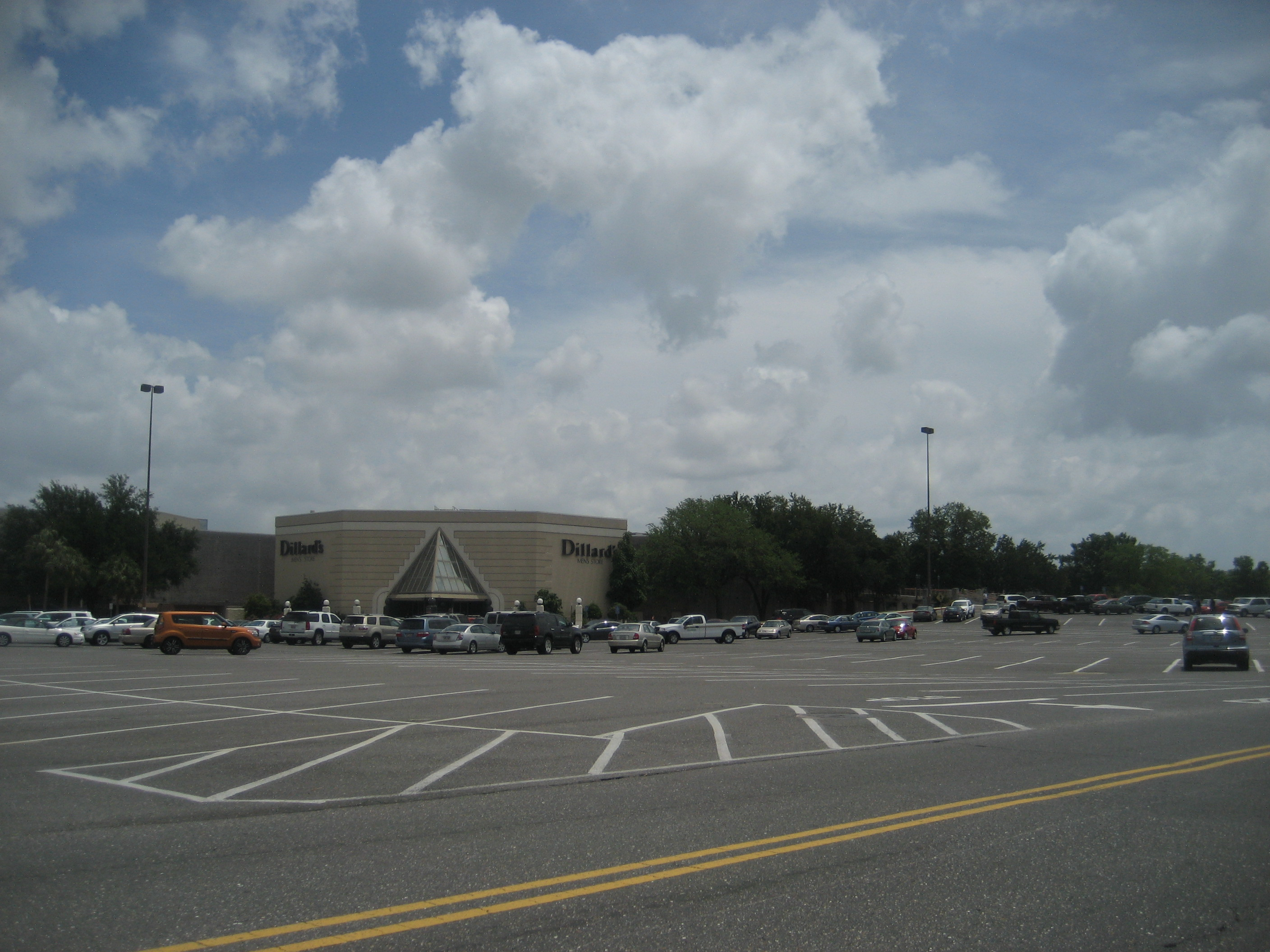
Dillard's Clearance Center in The Esplanade Mall in Kenner, Louisiana

As of April 2020, Dillard's operated 28 clearance stores in the United States. Dillard's Clearance Centers occupy 26 mall spaces throughout multiple states for the clearance stock of clothing from prior seasons. They are usually located within declining shopping malls in former full-line Dillard's locations as the no longer high priced items are not as covetable for the general clientele Dillard's procures. The 265 regular department stores ship the clearance clothing at already 65% off to these Clearance Centers where the clothing is then marked down further to liquidate the heaps of clothing and shoes.

The Clearance Centers are similar to that of a Marshalls or TJ Maxx, offering an unpredictable inventory with sizes and quantities. However, all the clothing at Dillard's Clearance Centers are direct from the normal Dillard's Department Stores close to and surrounding the one outlet. The goods that are sent to these stores are including, but not limited to: overstocked, offseason, didn't sell well, or damaged.

Typically, Clearance centers are closed on Mondays for restocking.

== Controversies ==
=== Lawsuits ===
==== Hartley v. Dillard Inc ====
On November 18, 2002, Dorman Hartley, a former Dillard's employee, filed a lawsuit against Dillard's for alleged age discrimination. Hartley had been the store manager at Dillard's McCain Mall store from 1989 until he was terminated in 1999, due to what Dillard's claimed was poor job performance, citing the store's declining fiscal performance under him. A thirty-two year old manager replaced Hartley, who was sixty-four. Hartley, backed by a testimony by an economist, asserted that in general, malls were losing market share, and that he should not be blamed for his store's decline. He also stated that younger managers in similarly declining stores were not fired. After two other Dillard's employees testified that Hartley's age was part of Dillard's decision to fire him, the jury ruled in favor of Hartley. He was awarded a $484,443.05 in combined back pay and front pay, as well as $65,268.86 in legal fees. Dillard's attempted to conduct a rehearing; the court denied it.
