= South Plains Mall =

Shopping mall in Lubbock, Texas, U.S.

Coordinates: 33.539392°N 101.925831°W

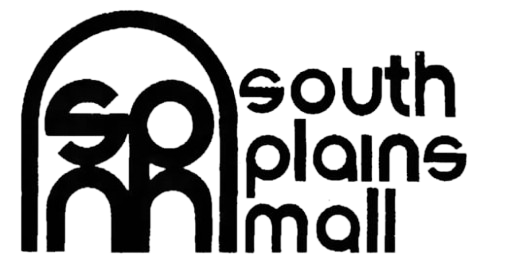
- Location: Lubbock, Texas, U.S.
- Opened: July 26, 1972; 54 years ago
- Developer: South Plains Mall Associates Ltd.
- Manager: Macerich
- Owner: Macerich
- Num. of stores: 145
- Num. of anchor tenants: 7 (4 open, 3 vacant)
- Floor area: 1,200,000 sq ft (110,000 m^{2})
- Floors: 1 (2 in Barnes & Noble, both former Dillard's locations, JCPenney, Premiere Cinemas, and new Dillard’s)
- Website: southplainsmall.com

South Plains Mall is a 1,200,000-square-foot (110,000 m^{2}) shopping mall located in Lubbock, Texas. It is located at the southwest corner of Loop 289 and Slide Road. It is anchored by Dillard's, JCPenney, Barnes & Noble bookstore, and a 16-screen (with an IMAX) Premiere Cinemas. There are three vacant anchors, two of them formerly occupied by Dillard's and one occupied by Bealls. The mall contains over 145 shops, restaurants, and kiosks. The mall serves the entire South Plains region. It is the only regional mall within 120 miles (190 km) and it serves an estimated market of 500,000 people (including West Texas and Eastern New Mexico).

== History ==
The mall was developed by South Plains Mall Associates Ltd. It opened on July 26, 1972, with 846,000 square feet (78,600 m^{2}) square feet of retail space. It was constructed at a cost of $25 million.

Macerich purchased the mall in 1998 for $115.7 million. It has been expanded to 1,107,000 square feet (102,800 m^{2}) since opening.

In 2015, Sears Holdings spun off 235 of its properties, including the Sears at South Plains Mall, into Seritage Growth Properties. Sears closed on January 9, 2019.

In August 2020, Bealls closed, due to the COVID-19 pandemic.

On July 26, 2022, SPM celebrated its 50th anniversary, with Chick-fil-A offering sandwiches for $0.50.

In November 2022, it was reported that Dillard's would consolidate from their previous two anchor stores (one for women and one for men) into a third, much larger 220,000 sq ft store on the west side, on the site of the former Sears anchor store, which was demolished in January 2023. The new Dillard's anchor store opened on October 9, 2024.

As of June 2026, it is unknown whether to demolish the old vacant spot where Dillard's women used to be. In Fall 2025, Spirit Halloween took over the old men's and children.

Forever 21 shut down in April 2025 due to bankruptcy.
