= Vips (Mexican restaurant) =

Restaurant chain in Mexico

Mexican logo (top) and Spanish logo (bottom)

Vips is a restaurant chain of casual full-service restaurants across Mexico and Spain founded by the Arango brothers and owned by Alsea, a Mexican hospitality and retail conglomerate. Visually and in the type and quality of service, they are similar to a U.S. "coffee shop" or diner such as Denny's, and compete with Sanborns, Toks and Wings with the format. The chain's restaurants are located in Mexico and Spain and operate in more than 70 cities and now has 260 restaurants serving around 9 million customers a year.

== History ==
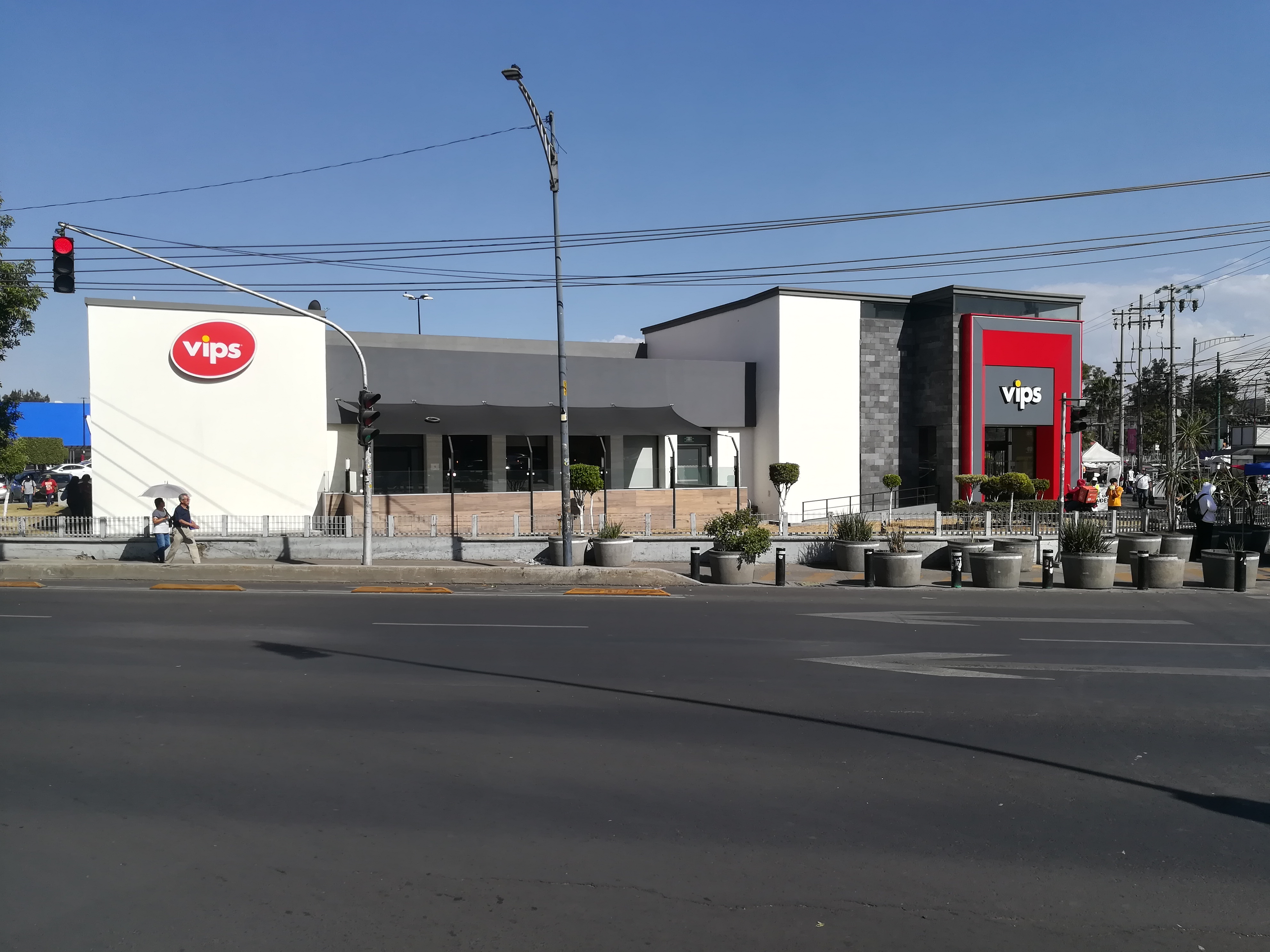
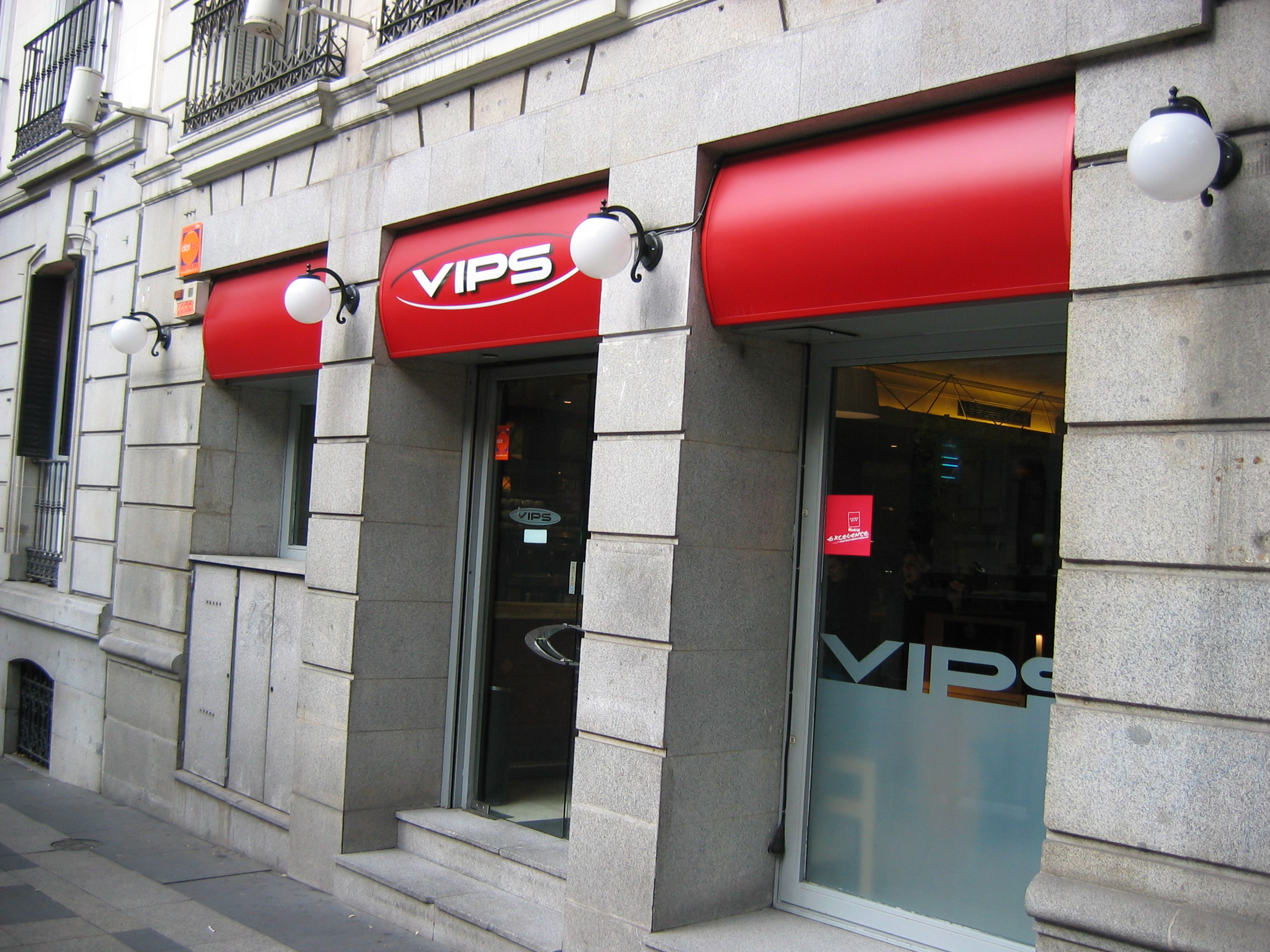
A Mexican restaurant in 2026 (top) and a Spanish restaurant in 2005 (bottom)

The firm was founded in 1964 in Mexico City by brothers Jerónimo, Plácido and Manuel Arango (also founding owners of the hypermarket Aurrerá and the mass-market department store Suburbia), while they founded Vips in Spain – the birth country of the brothers' parents – in 1969, at the initiative of Plácido. At first, the restaurant was called VIP (an acronym for Very Important People) but as the public commonly called it "Vips", the firm later changed its name to it. The first restaurant was located in the neighborhood of Lomas de Sotelo, Mexico City. The chain expanded to Madero Street and Azcapotzalco then in 1974 outside of the city to Acapulco. In 1994 it merged with Walmart de México, which then sold Vips to Alsea in 2014 for 8.2 billion Mexican pesos.
