= Ingram Park Mall =

Coordinates: 29.468387°N 98.617801°W

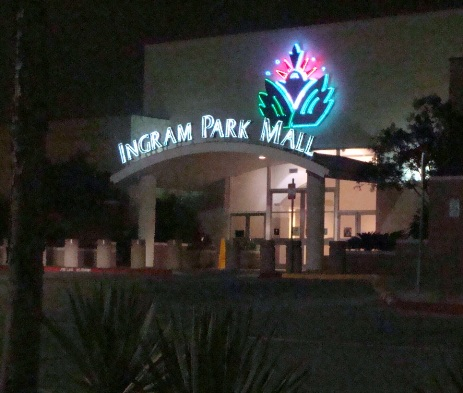
- Location: San Antonio, Texas, United States
- Opened: March 1, 1979
- Developer: Melvin Simon & Associates
- Manager: Spinoso Real Estate Group
- Num. of stores: 147
- Num. of anchor tenants: 6 (5 open, 1 vacant)
- Floor area: 1,120,444 sq ft (104,092.7 m^{2})
- Floors: 2 (third floor penthouse in Dillard's)
- Website: ingram-park-mall.com

Ingram Park Mall is a super regional shopping center located in the northwest section of San Antonio, Texas, at the intersection of Interstate 410 and Ingram Road. The anchor stores are Dillard's, JCPenney, Mega Furniture, Rush Maxx, and Macy's Backstage.

== History ==
The mall opened on March 1, 1979 with J. C. Penney, Dillard's, Joske's, and Sears. Foley's was added as a fifth anchor in 1983.

In 2015, Sears Holdings spun off 235 of its properties, including the Sears at Ingram Park Mall, into Seritage Growth Properties.

On October 15, 2018, it was announced that Sears would be closing as part of a plan to close 142 stores nationwide.

In 2021, the mall was sold at a foreclosure auction for $100.7 million to an entity associated with the investment firm Morgan Stanley, one month after Simon Property Group defaulted its loan. The sale did not include store space owned by Dillard's, JCPenney, Sears or Macy's.

In the 2020s, new anchor tenants were announced to be filling the space of the former Sears. The former Sears was subdivided into two new anchor tenants. Mega Furniture, a furniture store, opened on the lower level of the former Sears. Rush Maxx, an entertainment facility with bowling, go karts, an arcade, and laser tag opened on the upper level of the former Sears. Rush Maxx has added new experience into the mall.

== Anchors ==
- Dillard's (184,644 sq ft.)
- J. C. Penney (179,714 sq ft.)
- Macy's (147,728 sq ft.) (opened 1983 as Foley's, became Macy's 2006)
- Mega Furniture (74,104 sq ft.) (opened in the lower level of the former Sears store 2023)
- Rush Maxx (95,761 sq ft.) (opened in the upper level of the former Sears store 2024)

== Former Anchors ==
- Dillard's Home Center - closed in 2013
- Sears (150,000 sq ft.) - closed in 2019
