= Bodega Aurrerá =

Mexican supermarket chain

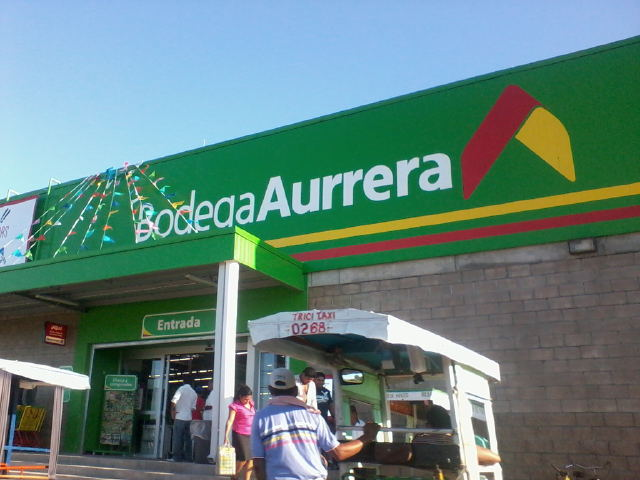
- A Bodega Aurrerá store in Macuspana, Tabasco.
- Type: Subsidiary
- Industry: Retail
- Genre: Discount store
- Founded: 1970 (as Bodega Aurrerá); 1958 (parent brand Aurrerá)
- Founder: Jerónimo Arango, Placido Arango, Manuel Arango
- Headquarters: Mexico City, Mexico
- Number of locations: 2,500+ (as of November 2024)
- Area served: Mexico
- Parent: Walmart de México y Centroamérica
- Website: bodegaaurrera.com.mx

Bodega Aurrerá is a Mexican discount store chain and subsidiary of Walmart de México y Centroamérica (Walmex). Founded in 1970 in Mexico City, the brand was originally part of Grupo Cifra, a retail conglomerate established by the Arango brothers. Following Walmart's acquisition of majority control in 1997 and the subsequent corporate reorganization in 2001, the original "Aurrerá" hypermarkets were converted into Walmart Supercenters, while the "Bodega Aurrerá" format was retained to serve the discount market sector.

As of November 2024, the chain operates over 2,500 stores across Mexico, comprising roughly half of Walmex's total units in the country. The brand is distinguished by its mascot, "Mamá Lucha", a masked luchadora character introduced in 2006 to represent the company's price-fighting strategy.

== History ==
=== Origins and Grupo Cifra (1958–1990) ===
In 1958, Jerónimo Arango, inspired by the discount model of E.J. Korvette in New York City, founded the first Aurrerá store (Basque for "Forward") on Bolívar Street in Mexico City. Co-founded with his brothers Placido and Manuel, the store broke from traditional Mexican retail practices by offering household goods and clothing at deep discounts.

The success of the flagship led to the creation of Grupo Cifra. In 1970, the company launched the Bodega Aurrerá format, specifically designed as a warehouse store with basic amenities to maintain lower operational costs and consumer prices. Throughout the 1970s and 1980s, Cifra expanded its portfolio to include Vips restaurants (1964), Suburbia department stores (1970), and El Portón (1978). In 1990, Aurrerá became the first Mexican retailer to implement barcode technology.

=== Walmart Acquisition (1991–2001) ===
In 1991, Cifra entered a joint venture with the American retailer Walmart, creating the "International Division of Walmart Stores" in Mexico. This partnership brought the first Sam's Club to Mexico.

By 1997, Walmart acquired a majority stake in Grupo Cifra, taking operational control. In 2000, the entity was renamed Walmart de México. A significant restructuring occurred in 2001: the company decided to phase out the "Aurrerá" hypermarket brand, converting those 24 locations into Walmart Supercenters. However, executives chose to retain the Bodega Aurrerá brand due to its strong brand equity and effectiveness in reaching lower-income demographics (sectors C and D).

=== Expansion (2001–Present) ===
Following the restructuring, Bodega Aurrerá became the primary growth vehicle for Walmex. In 2005, the company introduced Mi Bodega Aurrerá, a smaller format designed for towns with populations under 50,000. This was followed by Bodega Aurrerá Express in 2008, a convenience store format intended for high-density neighborhoods.

In November 2024, Walmex celebrated the opening of its 2,500th Bodega Aurrerá unit in Mexicali, marking a significant milestone in the brand's ubiquity across the Mexican Republic.

== Store Formats ==
Bodega Aurrerá operates under three distinct formats, segmented by size and target population:

Format	Description	Target Market
Bodega Aurrerá	The original warehouse format. Offers general merchandise, groceries, and appliances. Sizes typically range from 2,500 to 4,000 m².	Large urban and semi-urban areas.
Mi Bodega Aurrerá	Created in 2005. Smaller footprint (approx. 1,000 m²) with a limited assortment of essentials.	Semi-rural communities and small towns.
Bodega Aurrerá Express	Created in 2008. Convenience format located on street corners within neighborhoods.	High-density residential areas ("barrios").

== Brand Identity ==
=== Mascot: Mamá Lucha ===
In 2006, Bodega Aurrerá introduced "Mamá Lucha," a masked female character dressed in green, red, and yellow (the brand's colors). Created by the advertising agency Olabuenaga Chemistri, the character depicts a "luchadora" (wrestler) who fights against high prices. The campaign was designed to resonate with the "ama de casa" (housewife) demographic, framing the daily management of household finances as a heroic struggle. Mamá Lucha has since become one of the most recognizable brand assets in Mexico, undergoing a visual redesign in 2023 to appear more modern and agile.

=== Marketing Strategy ===
The chain utilizes the slogan "La campeona de los precios bajos" (The champion of low prices). A recurring campaign, "Morralla" (Loose Change), highlights products that can be purchased with coins, reinforcing the brand's accessibility to low-income shoppers.

== See also ==
- Walmart de México y Centroamérica
- Economy of Mexico
- Superama (now Walmart Express)
