= Aurrerá =

Former Logo

Aurrerá (word from the Basque language "aurrera" which means "forward") is a defunct grocery chain in Mexico. It started operations in 1958 in Mexico City, and folded in 2001 after being acquired by Walmart.

During 2001 and 2002, the remaining Aurrerá stores became Bodega Aurrerá and Walmart Supercenter stores. In addition, many products (mostly milk) are now marketed at these stores under the Aurrerá brand, similar to Walmart's Great Value brand.

== History and pop culture ==
In Mexico, the Arango brothers, Jerónimo, Placido and Manuel, founded the stores Aurrera thinking in a supermarket model, with household items and clothing at cheaper prices. Aurrera in Basque means "Come on", "Forward".

- 1958: Opens the first store Aurrera, with the branche Bolívar.
- 1960: Begins to operate stores Superama 1960.
- 1964: Starts operations Vips Restaurants 1964.
- 1970: Begins Suburbia and Bodega Aurrerá operations.
- 1976: Inaugurate First Distribution Center in Mexico (in Spanish, CEDIS).
- 1978: Opening of restaurants El Portón (The Gate).
- 1986: Makes the organization Grupo Cifra, for the administration of stores and restaurants in Mexico.
- 1990: Aurrerá starts the barcode system in Mexico.
- 1991: Walmart and Cifra makes a joint venture. Creation of the International Division of Walmart Stores and signed a partnership agreement with Cifra. Born the first Sam's Club in Mexico.
- 1993: Began operations Walmart Supercenter. The supermarkets Aurrerá changes style and design in Walmart stores.
- 1994: They're joined Suburbia and Vips inner the association Cifra/Walmart Distribuidora, S.A. de C.V.
- 1997: Walmart buys most of the shares and acquiring control of the company.
- 1999: Following the implementation of NAFTA [North American Free Trade Agreement]; Grupo CIFRA initiates Mexico's first duty-free importation of fresh Canadian Beef from Biological Farm Management Systems (BFMS) Inc., an Alberta, CANADA export company.
- 2000: Grupo Cifra renames figure at Walmart de Mexico.
- 2001: Aurrera stores become Walmart Supercenters and Warehouse Aurrera.

This store has appeared in many telenovelas and Mexican films.
