= William T. Dillard =

American businessman

- Born: William Thomas Dillard; September 2, 1914; Mineral Springs, Arkansas, US
- Died: February 8, 2002 (aged 87); Little Rock, Arkansas, US
- Resting place: Roselawn Memorial Park, Little Rock, Arkansas
- Education: University of Arkansas; Columbia University
- Occupations: President, Chairman & CEO at Dillard's (1938–1998)
- Known for: Founder of Dillard's
- Successor: William T. Dillard II
- Spouse: Alexa Latimer (m. June 9, 1940)
- Children: 5
- Website: dillards.com

William Thomas Dillard (September 2, 1914 – February 8, 2002) was an American businessman. He was the founder of the Dillard's department store chain.

== Early life ==
Dillard was born on September 2, 1914, to Thomas J. Dillard and Hattie Mae Gibson Dillard, both grocers. At 12 years old, Dillard began working for his father who owned a local general store. Dillard found employment with Sears & Roebuck Company where he gained experience in retail business. He graduated from the University of Arkansas with a degree in Business Administration and earned an MBA from Columbia University. He was a member of the Lambda Chi Alpha fraternity.

== Career ==
Dillard returned to Arkansas and opened his first retail store in 1938 in the town of Nashville, Arkansas, after he borrowed US$8,000 from his father to sign the lease and install shelves, and stocking those shelves with merchandise supplied on generous credit, extended on the basis of wholesalers' long dealings with his father. In 1948, he sold his Nashville store and opened stores in Texas, followed by more stores across the Southern United States. In 1964, he opened his first store in a mall in Austin, Texas, and foreshadowed the boom of malls. In 1965, he opened more stores in malls in Little Rock, Arkansas, and Tulsa, Oklahoma. He used computerized checkouts to track inventory. By the end of the 20th century, Dillard's was the third largest department store chain in the United States. He retired in 1998. His eldest son, William T. Dillard II, took over as CEO and his second son, Alex Dillard, as president. His daughters, Drue Corbusier and Denise Mahaffy, and a third son, Mike Dillard, serve as vice presidents.

== Personal life and death ==
Dillard married Alexa Latimer on June 9, 1940, and they had five children. He was an Episcopalian, and a Republican. He died on February 8, 2002, at his home in Little Rock, Arkansas at the age of 87. In February 2020, the University of Arkansas announced the naming of William Dillard Accounting Department in honor of his legacy.
