= Bourbon & Boots =

Bourbon & Boots Acquisition Company LLC
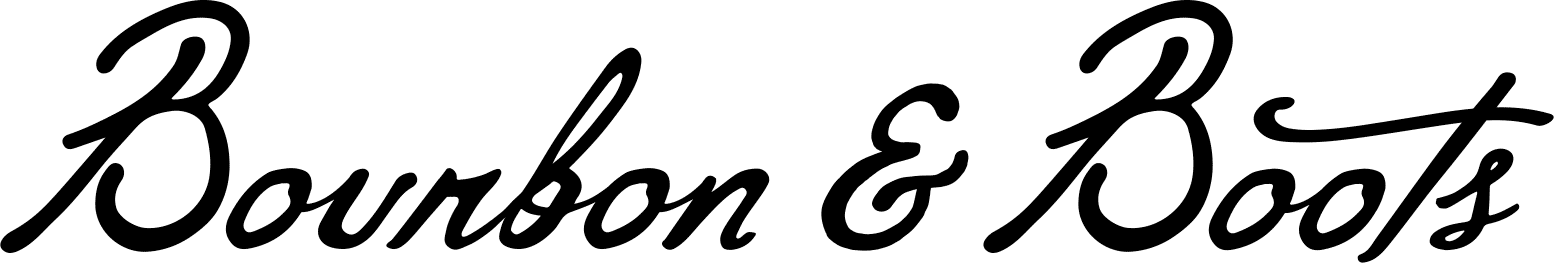

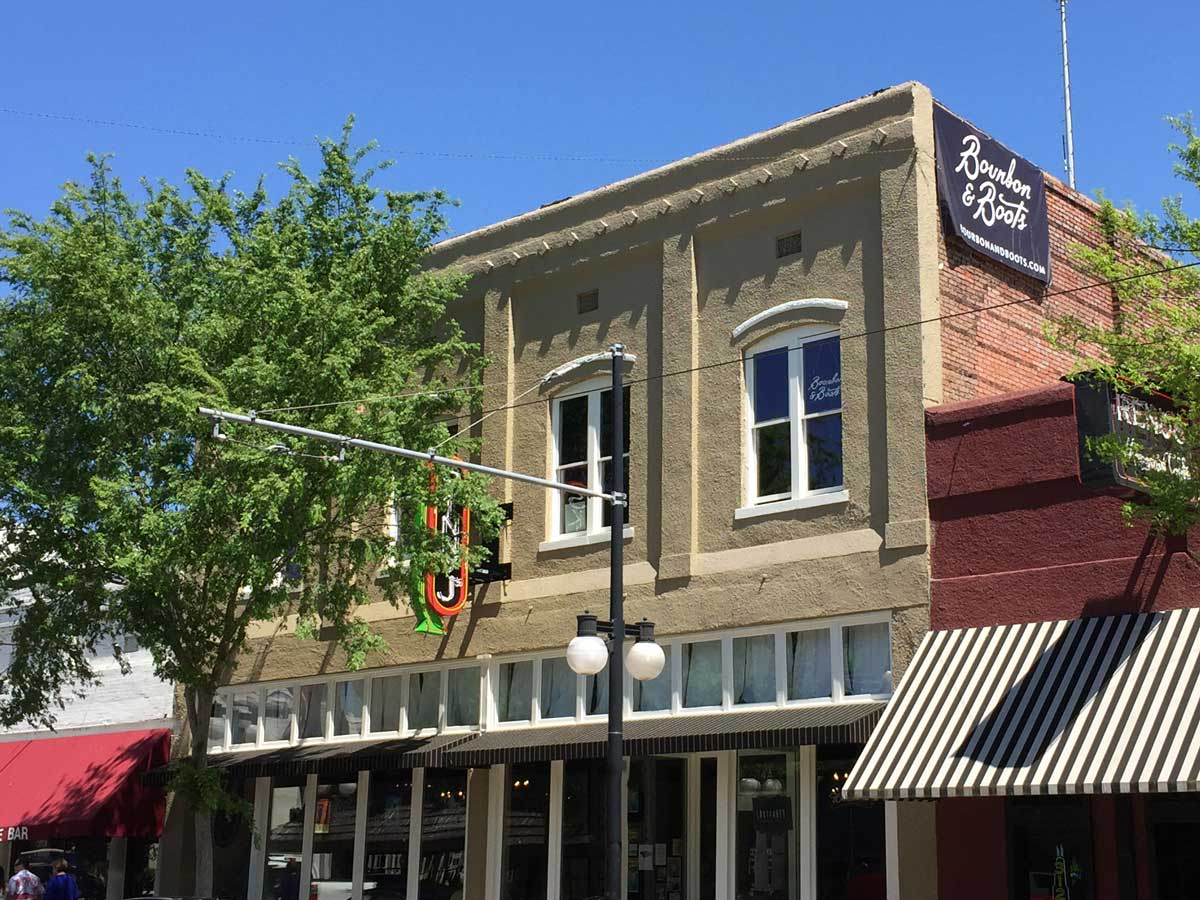
- Bourbon & Boots Headquarters in 2016
- Type: Corporation
- Industry: Southern Lifestyle Brand
- Founded: 2012
- Founders: Matt Price, Mike Meuller, and Scott Copeland
- Defunct: April 2, 2019
- Fate: Forced closure
- Headquarters: Little Rock, Arkansas, United States
- Key people: Rod Ford, Investment Advisor
- Products: Rare & Unique Artisan Inspired Handcrafted Goods
- Owner: xCelerate Capital, LLC
- Website: www.bourbonandboots.com

Bourbon & Boots, was an American company and online southern brand that manufactured and sold handcrafted merchandise, goods, and gifts. The company was based in the Riverdale District of Little Rock, Arkansas. The company went out of business in 2019 after government action had been taken against them.

The Bourbon & Boots domain was purchased in 2019 and is now used for a rustic lifestyle blog, unconnected to the original business or its owners.

== History ==
=== Foundation and early years ===
Bourbon & Boots was founded in February 2012 in Little Rock, Arkansas In May 2015 early-stage private equity firm xCelerate Capital purchased the assets of the Bourbon & Boots Brand.

In August 2015 the company moved into a new and expanded Headquarters on Main Street in the Argenta Historic District in North Little Rock, AR, adjacent to the Arkansas Innovation Hub with whom it partners for new product development. The company recognized over $1M in revenue for the month of December 2015, and has grown the company to a healthy growth rate revenue projections for 2016. In February 2016 the company purchased "Tales from the South", a Southern Lifestyle content generation and media distribution company.

=== Better Business Bureau Consumer Alert 2017 ===
"In February 2017, BBB contacted the business regarding a pattern of complaints. Consumers have reported that they have paid for products, ordered products and are not receiving the products or products received are defective. Consumers also complained about difficulty reaching the business to inquire of the status of their orders or to request refunds for products not received.

The business responded to BBB with an explanation that certain vendors underestimated their capacity and were unable to fulfill all of the business's orders. The business assured BBB that they are working with their vendors to ensure capacity to meet the business's growth demands. The business also indicated it hired a full-time manager to oversee the customer response team to improve service and communication with its customers.

In May 2017, BBB contacted the business again to state concerns regarding continued complaints regarding lack of communication from the business and inability to reach the business concerning order status. The business responded with assurance that consumers are responded to via chat line or email.

As of July 2017, BBB records indicate complaints continue where consumers report difficulty in communication with the business."

=== Arkansas Attorney General files suit 2019 ===
"On April 2nd, 2019 Arkansas Attorney General Leslie Rutledge filed a lawsuit against Bourbon and Boots and owner Rodney Ford under the Arkansas Deceptive Trade Practices Act. "Bourbon and Boots advertised itself as a southern lifestyle brand which offered artisan inspired and quality craftsmanship," said Rutledge in a press release. "Instead, customers unwittingly wasted their hard-earned money on these products, only to never receive them or receive the wrong item.

I will not tolerate deceptive business practices and will do everything in my power to ensure that the company and its owner are held responsible for their damaging actions." Rutledge is seeking $19,991.03 in restitution for wronged victims in addition to attorneys' fees, costs and other relief against Bourbon and Boots and Ford. Rutledge says her office has received 55 complaints against Bourbon and Boots and the Better Business Bureau has received 293. Any additional complaints should be shared with the Arkansas Attorney General's Office by calling (800) 482-8982."
