= Alsea (company) =

Mexican restaurant chain operator

Coordinates: 19°21′37.8″N 99°11′23.5″W

Alsea, S.A.B. de C.V.
- Type: Public
- Traded as: BMV: ALSEA
- Industry: Restaurants
- Predecessor: Operadora DP, S.A. de C.V
- Founded: 16 May 1997; 29 years ago in Mexico City, Mexico
- Headquarters: Mexico City, Mexico
- Area served: Latin America; Spain
- Key people: Alberto Torrado M. (chairman); Federico Tejado Bárcena (CEO Alsea Mexico); Fabian Gosselin Castro (CEO Alsea International)
- Brands: Starbucks; Burger King; Chili's Bar & Grill; California Pizza Kitchen; PF Chang's; Pei Wei Asian Diner; Popeyes; Italianni's; The Cheesecake Factory; Raising Cane's; Chipotle
- Revenue: ▲US$ 1,714 million (2014); US$ 1,230 million (2013)
- Net income: ▼US$ 50 million (2014); US$ 53 million (2013)
- Total assets: ▲US$ 1,970 million (2014); US$ 948 million (2013)
- Number of employees: 60,000 (2014)
- Website: www.alsea.net

Alsea, S.A.B. de C.V., known as Alsea, is a Mexican multi-brand restaurant operator based in Mexico City, Mexico. It was founded as a holding company in 1997. Its operating portfolio includes fast-food, casual dining, and cafeteria type restaurant chains located in Mexico, South America and Europe. It is one of the largest foodservice companies in Mexico according to CNN Expansión.

Some of the restaurant chains that Alsea operates are Starbucks, Burger King, Vips, Popeyes, Italianni's, Chili's, California Pizza Kitchen, P. F. Chang's, Pei Wei Asian Diner, The Cheesecake Factory, and, more recently, Raising Cane's and Chipotle, both of which are expected to open restaurants in Mexico in 2026.

Alsea reported revenues of US$1.7 billion for 2014. It operates more than 3,093 units of restaurant chains in Mexico, Spain, Chile, Argentina, Colombia, Brazil, The Netherlands, Italy & France and employs more than 60,000 people. Alsea is listed on the Mexican Stock Exchange and is a constituent of the IPC, the main benchmark index of Mexican stocks.

In 2014, Alsea acquired the Mexican restaurant chain Vips and the Spanish Grupo Zena.

== Brands portfolio ==
Alsea has the rights to manage and open restaurants from these brands as follows (last updated: 31 January 2024):

Restaurant	Country	Locations	Total locations
Starbucks	Mexico	796	1,727
Starbucks	France	240	1,727
Starbucks	Spain	159	1,727
Starbucks	Chile	158	1,727
Starbucks	Argentina	132	1,727
Starbucks	Netherlands	100	1,727
Starbucks	Colombia	63	1,727
Starbucks	Belgium	34	1,727
Starbucks	Portugal	25	1,727
Starbucks	Uruguay	14	1,727
Starbucks	Luxembourg	4	1,727
Starbucks	Paraguay	2	1,727
Domino's	Mexico	862	1,401
Domino's	Spain	379	1,401
Domino's	Colombia	157	1,401
Domino's	Uruguay	3	1,401
Burger King	Mexico	172	415
Burger King	Argentina	115	415
Burger King	Chile	73	415
Burger King	Spain	55	415
Vips	Mexico	238	402
Vips	Spain	164	402
Foster's Hollywood	Spain	221	221
Ginos	Spain	118	120
Ginos	Portugal	2	120
Chili's	Mexico	70	75
Chili's	Chile	5	75
Italianni's	Mexico	75	75
P. F. Chang's	Mexico	28	31
P. F. Chang's	Chile	3	31
Archies	Colombia	29	29
TGI Fridays	Spain	13	13
The Cheesecake Factory	Mexico	7	7

== Expansion ==
In February 2019, Alsea de CV acquires the rights for the development of the Starbucks brand in the Netherlands, Belgium, and Luxembourg.

In September 2013, Alsea acquired 362 Walmex restaurants Vips and El Porton for around $626 million.

In 2025, the company stated they planned to enter Mexico market in 2026.
