= William T. Dillard II =

American businessman

William Thomas Dillard II
- Born: March 4, 1945 (age 81); Smithville, Mississippi, U.S.
- Education: University of Arkansas (BBA); Harvard University (MBA)
- Occupation: Businessman
- Political party: Independent
- Spouse: Mary Dillard
- Parent: William T. Dillard

William T. Dillard II (born 1945) is an American heir and businessman, and chairman and chief executive officer of Dillard's (NYSE:DDS).

== Early life ==
William T. Dillard was born in 1945. His father was William T. Dillard (1914 – 2002), founder of Dillard's. He graduated from the University of Arkansas with a Bachelor of Business Administration and later received an M.B.A from the Harvard Business School.

== Career ==
Dillard joined the board of directors of Dillard's in 1967. In 1977, he became president and chief operating officer. In 1988, he joined the Board of Acxiom, a marketing technology and services company, and he has been its vice chairman since 6 May 2006. He is chief executive officer of Dillard's since May 1998 and chairman since May 2002.

Dillard has been on the board of directors of Acxiom China since 1988; Barnes & Noble, since November 1993; the National Advisory Board and Dallas Region Advisory Board of JPMorgan Chase; Western Digital, one of the world's largest hard disk drive manufacturers; Dillards Capital Trust I; Dillard's Properties.

== Personal life ==
One of his brothers, Alex Dillard, is President of Dillard's, while his other brother, Mike, is its Executive Vice President. His son, William T. Dillard III, is Vice President of Dillard's.
