= Aaron Selber Jr. =

American businessman

Personal details
- Born: Aaron Rosenbaum Selber Jr. December 13, 1927 Shreveport, Louisiana, US
- Died: August 13, 2013 (aged 85)
- Resting place: Forest Park Cemetery in Shreveport
- Spouse: Peggy Burkenroad
- Education: Tulane University; Washington University in St. Louis School of Retailing
- Occupation: Businessman

Military service
- Branch/service: United States Army Air Forces Strategic Air Command

Aaron Rosenbaum Selber Jr. (December 13, 1927 – August 13, 2013) was an American businessman, the last president of the former Selber Bros. department store chain, and a philanthropist from Shreveport, the largest city in the northern portion of the U.S. state of Louisiana.

== Background ==
Selber was a son of a Jewish couple, Aaron R. Selber Sr. and the former Frances Dreyfuss. While growing up during the Great Depression, Selber developed his work ethic early, delivering the since defunct Shreveport Journal newspaper, selling the Saturday Evening Post, and servicing vending machines while attending elementary and junior high school at the private Southfield School and high school at the public C. E. Byrd, both in his native Shreveport. Selber graduated from Southfield School in 1940, one of the first graduates of the institution located at 1100 Southfield Road; in 2011, he was inducted into the Southfield Hall of Fame.

Selber enrolled at Tulane University in New Orleans for one year before he joined the United States Army Air Forces, in which he gained top secret clearance in the electronics section of the Strategic Air Command. After his military duty, Selber attended the School of Retailing at Washington University in St. Louis, Missouri. He then returned to Tulane where he graduated in 1950 with a Bachelor of Business Administration degree. He was subsequently inducted into the Paul Tulane Society.

At Tulane, Selber met his future wife, the former Peggy Burkenroad. She was a board member of the Meadows Museum of Art at Centenary and the Sci-Port Discovery Center in Shreveport. Like her husband, Peggy Selber was a generous philanthropist, an artist, and a golfer who won multiple championships.

== Career ==
Selber returned to Shreveport to work in the family retail clothing business. Under his leadership as the company president, Selber Bros. became a regional department store chain with outlets in Louisiana and Texas. The first store was established in 1907 at 227 Texas Avenue in downtown Shreveport by Selber's grandfather, Charles Selber. In addition to Aaron Sr., there were three other Selber brothers, the uncles of Aaron Selber Jr. – Isadore, Louis, and Mandel Charles Selber. Hence three of the four Selber Brothers died in the nine-month period between December 1967 and August 1968.

Following the sale in 1988 of Selber Bros. to Dillard's Department Stores, Aaron Selber Jr. became for the remainder of his life an investor: "Cash rather than merchandise became my inventory." Selbert attributed his optimistic business philosophy to the influence upon him from his father, his father-in-law William Burkenroad, and Jacob Aron, Burkenroad's business partner in New York City. The senior Aaron Selber had limited higher education, having attended a business college, but he possessed an uncanny grasp of human nature. Billy Burkenroad made his fortune in the coffee business with Jacob Aron, and like the Selbers was a generous philanthropist. In 1978, Burkenroad switched the focus entirely of the J. Aron Company from years of coffee importation to the trading of commodities.

Selber was a member of the National Retail Merchants and the Specialty Retail Stores associations. Aaron Selber, with his wife Peggy, was a large donor to many nonprofit organizations in both Shreveport and New Orleans. They established the Aaron or Peggy Selber Foundation in Shreveport and the Aaron and Peggy Selber Family Donor Advised Fund within the New Orleans Community Foundation. Selber was a former chairman of the board of the Blue Cross Blue Shield Association of Louisiana. He was a director of Commercial National Bank at 333 Texas Avenue in Shreveport and a president of the Shreveport Jaycees and later the Chamber of Commerce. He was president of his alma mater, Southfield School, Goodwill Industries, and the Holiday in Dixie spring festival. He was a board member of Louisiana State University Health Sciences Center Shreveport, the Norwela Council of Boy Scouts of America, the American Red Cross, the Louisiana State Fair, YMCA, United Way, and the college football post-Christmas Independence Bowl, The Selbers were members of the B'nai Zion Congregation.

== Death and family ==
Selber died in 2013 at the age of eighty-five at his Shreveport home of congestive heart failure. His motto was "Live your life in a wonderful way!" He was a member of the B'nai Zion Congregation in Shreveport. There are four Selber daughters, Patty Selber Newton and husband Carl of Baton Rouge, Pam Selber of Newport Beach, California, Polly Selber Gleichenhaus and husband Barry of Denver, Colorado, and Penny Selber Autenreith and husband Robert of New Orleans. Horace Ladymon, owner of the former Beall-Ladymon Corporation, was among Selber's honorary pallbearers.
