= Jerónimo Arango =

Mexican businessman (1927–2020)

- Born: 1927; Mexico
- Died: April 4, 2020 (aged 92–93)
- Occupations: Co-founder, Aurrerá

Jerónimo Julio Arango Arias (1927 — 4 April 2020) was a Mexican billionaire businessman, co-founder of the Aurrerá supermarket chain, with his younger brothers, Manuel and Plácido, known for a long time as three of Mexico's wealthiest men. His net worth was estimated at US$4.6 billion in 2006 by Forbes.

== Career ==
Arango founded his Aurrerá discount stores in 1958 after a trip to New York where he witnessed people standing in long lines to obtain discounts; he decided to open one that sold at discount, emphasizing cost over other niceties. The stores flourished and eventually, his family's company, Grupo CIFRA, was the largest supermarket chain in Mexico (including Aurrerá and Superama stores) as well as restaurants (VIPs and El Portón) and fashion stores (Suburbia).

By 1991, Arango partnered with Wal-Mart, a move that eventually brought the Wal-Mart retail stores to Mexico. The Mexican chain was later renamed Walmex and became the starting point for Wal-Mart's expansion in Mexico. By 1997 the Arango family decided to sell majority shareholding of CIFRA to Wal-Mart in a transaction worth over $2 billion.

Manuel, Jerónimo's brother is the president of the Mexican Center for Philanthropy as well for more than ten different non-profit organizations. He won two Academy Awards in the 1970s for the production of a well-known documentary about pre-Hispanic life. Manuel's wife, Marie-Therese Arango, is the president of the Mexican Folk Art Museum.

== Personal life ==
Prior to his death, his residence was in Los Angeles, California. He had a vacation home in Acapulco which was designed by John Lautner. This house known as the Marbrisa House, is considered an icon in space age/googie design. Arango died on 4 April 2020 due to natural causes.

== See also ==
- List of Mexican billionaires
