= Plaza San Pedro =

Shopping mall in Monterrey, Mexico

Plaza San Pedro is a shopping mall in Monterrey, Nuevo León, located in San Pedro Garza García on the Humberto Lobo Avenue almost in front of the Puente Atirantado and a block from Calzada del Valle/Calzada San Pedro. The shopping mall takes its name from the municipality it resides in. It has 150 shops.

== Attractions ==
Restaurants, shops, indoor ice skating rink, banks and various service centers
Adjacent to Soriana San Pedro
