= Hipermart =

Mexican supermarket chain

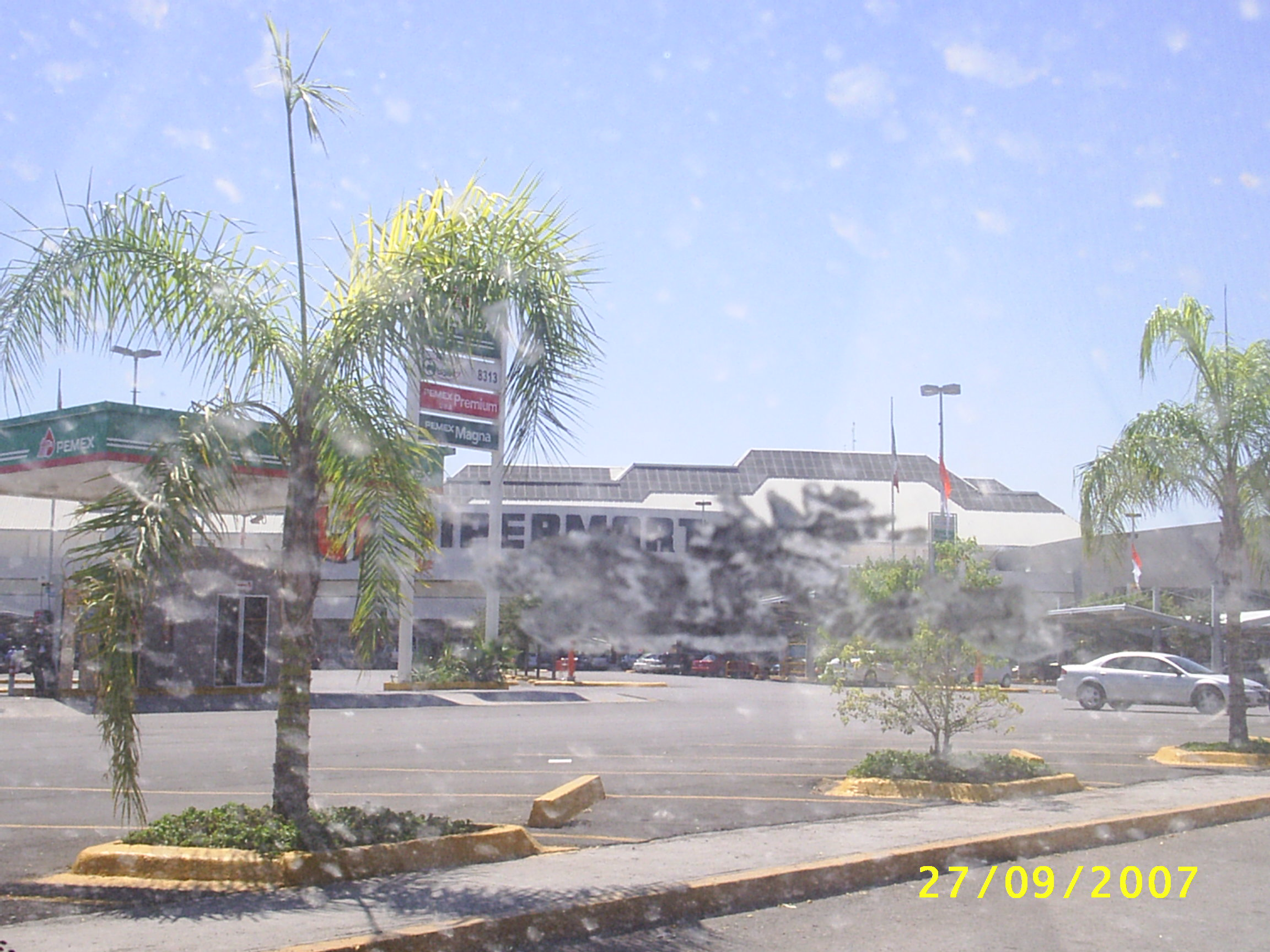
Hipermart Independencia

Hipermart is a Mexican hypermarket (supermarket) chain owned by the Soriana Organization. The chain opened its first stores in 1989 (San Pedro and Cumbres in Monterrey, and San Lorenzo in Ciudad Juárez). Later, the company opened new stores in Tecnológico in Chihuahua, Independencia and Oriente in Torreón, and Santa María in Monterrey. In 1995, the company was bought out by the Martin families from Torreón and Monterrey, who merged it into Soriana. Almost all the Hipermart stores have been renamed Soriana; only Independencia still operates under the original name.

== History ==
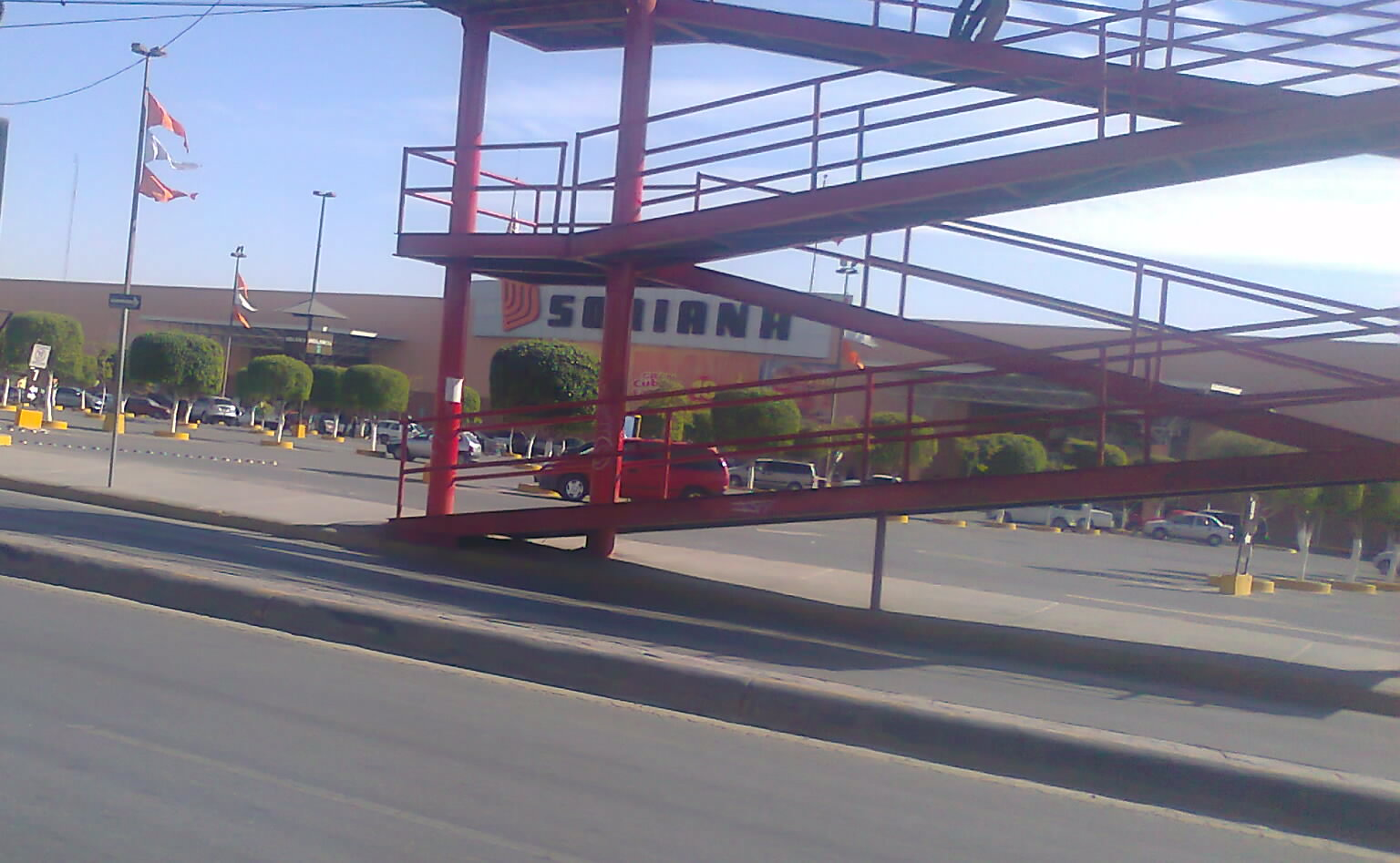
A former Hipermart Oriente in Torreón, Coahuila, now renamed as Soriana Híper Oriente

Hipermart emerged in the 80s, when the brothers Francisco and Armando Martín Borque (at that time the owners of Soriana) had serious differences that led them to separate business, so Don Armando continued to lead Soriana with the right "Tiendas de Descuento del Nazas" (Sorimex), while Mr. Francisco Martín Borque traveled to the city of Monterrey, Nuevo León, Mexico to later create the Hipermart store chain, which had the name "Tiendas de Descuento Sultana " (Organización Soriana), establishing its first commercial and corporate center on Blvd. Independencia in the city of Torreón. As a consequence of said business separation, in 1989 the first Hipermart stores were opened in Monterrey (San Pedro and Cumbres, which the latter is today the main headquarters and fiscal domicile of Organización Soriana), as well as a branch in Ciudad Juárez, Chihuahua (San Lorenzo).

As a consequence of said business separation, in 1989 the first Hipermart stores were opened in Monterrey (San Pedro and Cumbres, which the latter is today the main headquarters and fiscal domicile of Organización Soriana), as well as a branch in Ciudad Juárez, Chihuahua (San Lorenzo) in September of the same year. Subsequently, and until its definitive disappearance in 1995, the chain began to open hypermarkets in various cities in the North of the country, such as Torreón (Independencia and Oriente), Chihuahua (Tecnológico), Ciudad Juárez (Henequén & López Mateos) and Monterrey (Santa María).

In 1994, the Martin Borque brothers joined forces again and merged both chains, leaving the company name as "Centros Comerciales Soriana", and as it is now called "Tiendas Soriana".

=== After his disappearance and merger with Soriana ===
After this merger with Tiendas Soriana, the term Hipermart became Soriana's own brand, which used to offer a variety of products (hardware, food, household items, cleaning, among others), whose own brand lasted until 2016 with the purchase of Comercial Mexicana by Soriana, being replaced by the own brand Precissimo, while all the branches that carried the Hipermart name were renamed Soriana (currently Soriana Híper) in 1995, leaving the Independencia Torreón branch as the Soriana's only branch under the name of Hipermart until 2016 when it was now renamed as Soriana Hipermart.

In December 2016, and with an investment of more than $150 million Mexican pesos, Soriana reopens the former Hipermart San Pedro branch in the city of Monterrey, now under its format of Soriana Hiper Premium, this with the objective of the Soriana company of serving consumers with high purchasing power, which allowed them to insert novel concepts for said market segment, which the Soriana company was not serving at that time.

Later in 2019, the Hipermart Independencia de Torreón branch (now as part of Tiendas Soriana) was remodeled, with an investment of more than 100 million Mexican pesos, as part of a Soriana modernization and improvement plan.

== Business model ==
As its trade name indicated, Hipermart was a hypermarket focused on consumers located in cities with more than 150,000 inhabitants, where each of its existing stores had a sales area between 7,000 and 14,000 square meters.

His sales scheme was always retail, in which he handled a wide assortment of merchandise with 60,000 SKU's from the clothing, general merchandise, groceries, perishables, and prepared food divisions. They used to have a shopping center made up of 40 or 50 stores that the Company leased to third parties, who marketed products and services to consumers.

During its time as a self-service commercial chain, Hipermart had main competitors, such as Soriana (its current owner since 1994), Aurrerá together with its subsidiary Walmart, Gigante and Comercial Mexicana (the latter two also acquired by Soriana in 2007 and 2015). respectively)

== See also ==
- Soriana (parent's chain)
