= Innovasport and Innvictus =

Mexican sportswear retail company

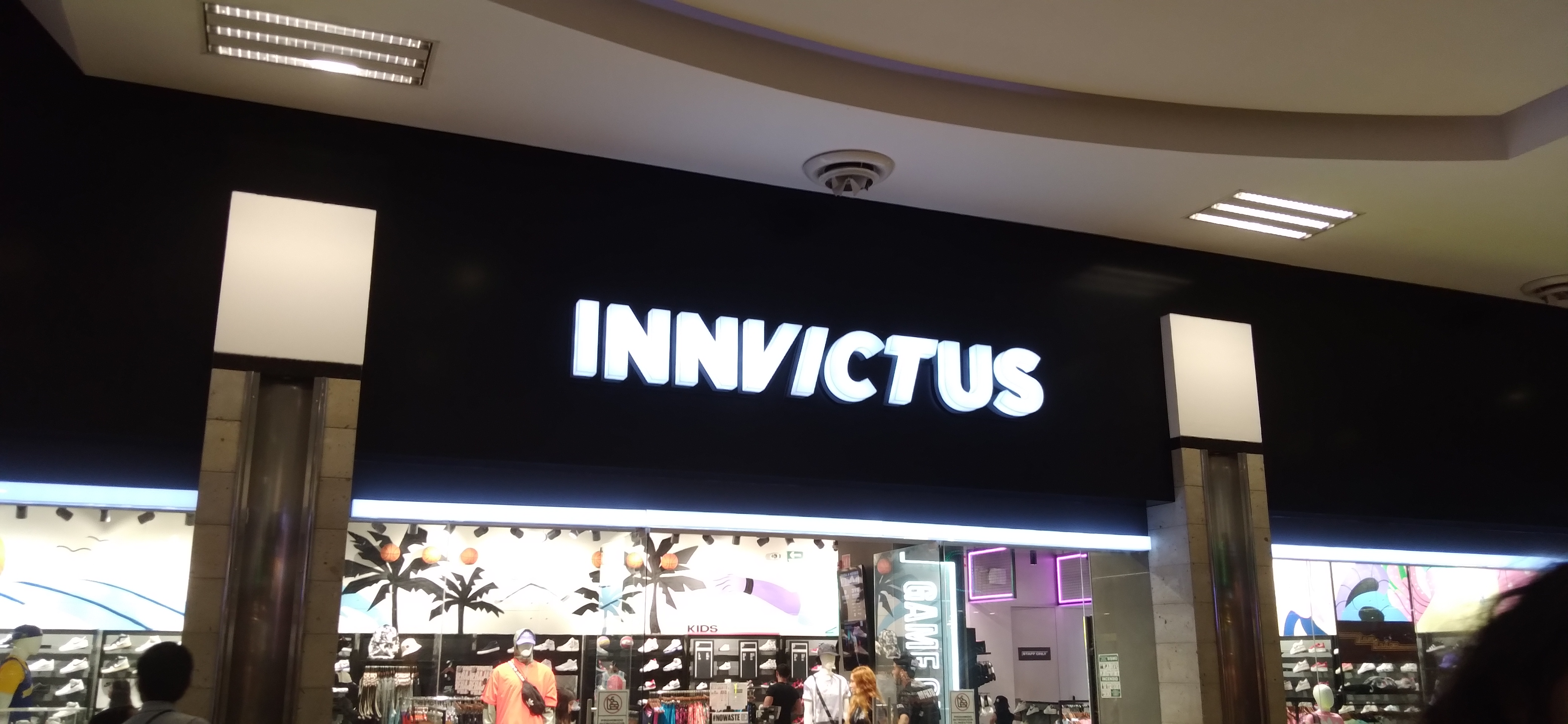
An Innvictus store in Gran Plaza mall, Mazatlán

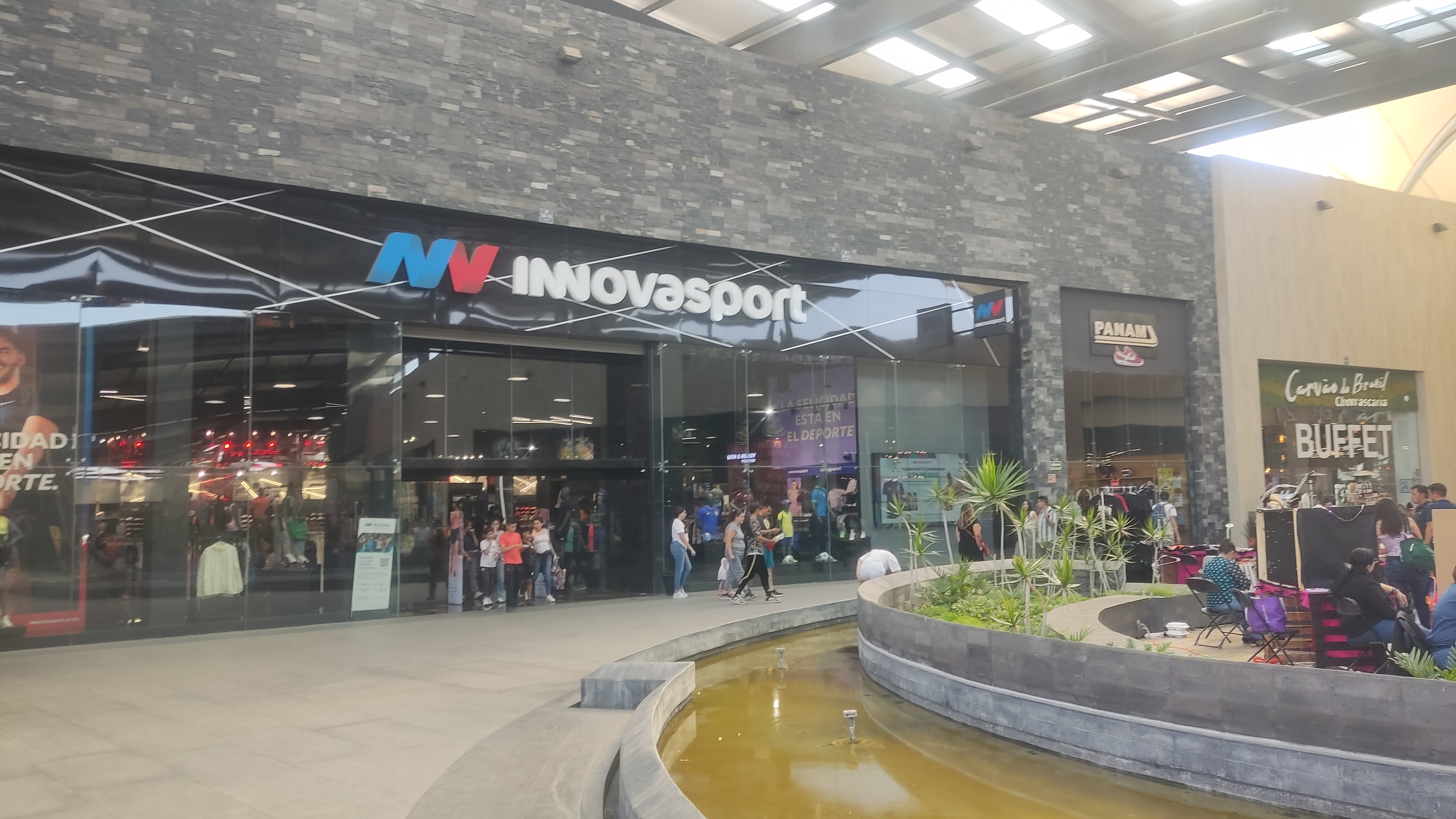
An Innovasport store in Plaza Las Américas, Ecatepec de Morelos

Grupo Innovasport operates, as of November 2023, 200 activewear and sporting goods stores and superstores across Mexico. 114 were branded Innovasport, 75 Innvictus and 13 Over Time.

The target market of Innvictus are sneakerheads, i.e. fans of sneakers with a focus on tennis shoes, accessories and urban casual wear, categories that have grown exponentially in recent years. Innvictus stores offer exclusive footwear from brands such as Jordan, Nike, Adidas, Puma, etc., and special events such as sneaker trading days.

== History ==
Francisco Martín Borque was a Spanish immigrant to Mexico and co-founded the Torreón-based Soriana chain of hypermarkets together with his brother Armando. Francisco Martín Bringas and his wife María Concepción Villar Manrique launched Innovasport in April 1999 in the Contry neighborhood of the much larger city of Monterrey, the core city of Mexico's third-largest metropolitan area. Innvictus was launched in April 2015 with its first store in the Galerías Monterrey shopping mall, also in Monterrey.

In 2011 Grupo Innovasport opened the largest sports and activewear store in Mexico, at 2,870 m^{2} (30,900 sq ft).

== Ownership ==
The ownership is split between:

- Organización Marbrin
- Francisco Martín Bringas
- María Concepción Villar Manrique

== Product lines ==
=== Sneakers ===
Analysts have noted that sneakers became very popular in Mexico in the decades up to the 2020s. What was once a simple sports shoe became a fashion and cultural phenomenon in Mexico, something that Innvictus took advantage of and monetized.

According to Euromonitor International, the Mexican shoe market experienced double-digit growth during the COVID-19 pandemic, driven mainly by the sale of sneakers.

== Partnerships ==
=== NBA ===
A few days before the NBA Mexico City Game on November 9, 2023, the National Basketball Association announced a multi-year partnership with InnovaSport to fully enter the Mexican market, offering fans the widest selection of authentic NBA merchandise ever available in Mexico. This was to be both by NBA stores operated by Innovasport, as well as a dedicated NBA e-commerce website for Mexico, nbatienda.com.

NBAtienda.com features:

- a wide range of NBA merchandise and memorabilia for sale, including:
  - apparel for men, women and children including jerseys, t-shirts, hoodies, shorts, (long) pants, caps, footwear, socks, sweatbands
- backpacks, fanny packs, basketballs
  - accessories from current and former players
- merchandise from licensees including Nike including (Jordan), Adidas, FILA, Under Armour, 47 Brand, Mitchell & Ness, New Era Cap Company and Wilson Sporting Goods
- exclusive team pages
