= Francisco Martín Borque =

Mexican businessman

Francisco Martín Borque.

Francisco Martin Borque (1917-1998) was a Spanish-Born Mexican businessman.

He was born in Soria, Spain on August 9, 1917, and died on December 24, 1998, in Torreon, Coahuila, their family arrived Veracruz port on October 30, 1926, then moved to Torreon with their uncle Pascual Borque, in 1930's decade toured Chihuahua, Sinaloa and Sonora sierras. He married Ana María Bringas on February 15, 1949, and with his brother Armando Martín Borque, in 1968 opened their first hypermarket under the name of Soriana.

In 1999, Fernando and Ana María would go on to found the Innovasport chain selling athletic shoes, activewear and sporting goods stores, and from there the Innvictus brand (focused more intensely on sneakers), with, combined, more than 100 branches across Mexico.
