= Calzada del Valle/Calzada San Pedro =

Boulevards in Nuevo León, Mexico

Coordinates: 25°39′24.35″N 100°22′13.70″W

Calzada del Valle and Calzada San Pedro are three-laned intersecting gardened boulevards that serve as the main avenues of the affluent Colonia del Valle neighborhood of San Pedro Garza García, a suburb of the larger metropolitan city of Monterrey, Nuevo León, Mexico. Exclusive shops, apartment buildings, and business offices are located throughout the avenues. The walkway in the boulevard is great for exercising, walking or marathons. Parades usually take place during Easter and Christmas through the Calzada.

Calzada del Valle is famous for its illuminated trees during Christmas season.

== History ==
San Pedro Garza García was initially a rural village south of Monterrey, founded as the Hacienda de San Pedro los Nogales by Diego de Montemayor in November 20th, 1596. It remained that way until 1940, when the first urbanizaron processes in the village were started.

In 1940, Alberto Santos acquired 470 hectares in the area and started the urbanization process of what would become the Colonia del Valle in 1946. He visioned ample gardened avenues running through the neighborhood, the current Calzada del Valle and Calzada San Pedro. To communicate the neighborhood with the rest of the city, a bridge, the Puente Miravalle, was built, connecting Calzada San Pedro with the city of Monterrey. As part of the construction, the private schools Colegio Franco Mexicano and Colegio La Bastida were also founded, as was the Church of Fátima, south of Calzada San Pedro.

== Events ==
This luxurious avenue is host to important events in the Monterrey Metropolitan area. Such events include:

- New Year's Celebration
- The Duendes Race
- Easter Parade
- Children's Day Parade
- Sport City Race
- Christmas Tree Illumination
- Christmas Parade
