= Armando Martín Borque =

Spanish businessman (1921–2011)

Armando Martín Borque

Armando Martín Borque was a Spanish entrepreneur. He was born in Soria, Spain on April 15, 1921. But soon thereafter, at the age of 5, he arrived to the Comarca Lagunera. Living in Torreon, he began working for his uncle Don Pascual Borque in the family's cloth store La Soriana. In 1968, together with his brother, Francisco Martín Borque, he began the expansion of the local family business and thus founded what is today known as Organización Soriana, the second largest retail chain in Mexico.

Armando Martin Borque died on July 20, 2011, in Torreon, Coahuila, the desert city where Soriana was founded.

== Sources ==
- Zocalo Saltillo

== See also ==
- Francisco Martín Borque
