= Águilas (disambiguation) =

Águilas is a municipality in Spain.

Águilas may also refer to:

- Águilas Blancas, a Mexican gridiron football team
- Águilas CF, a defunct Spanish football team
- Águilas Cibaeñas, a Dominican baseball team
- Águilas de Mexicali, a Mexican baseball team
- Aguilas de Tabasco, a Mexican football team
- Águilas de la UPAEP, a Mexican football team
- Águilas del Zulia, a Venezuelan baseball team
- Águilas Doradas Rionegro, a Colombian football team
- Águilas FC, a Spanish football team
- Águilas Metropolitanas, a Panamanian baseball team
- Águilas UAGro, a Mexican football team
- Club América, nicknamed the Águilas del América
- Pilipinas Aguilas, a Philippine basketball team
- Pilipinas MX3 Kings, formerly known as Pacquiao Powervit Pilipinas Aguilas
