= Villa de Santa María de la Victoria =

The Villa de Santa María de la Victoria was located in what is now the Mexican state of Tabasco. Now no longer in existence, it was located in the place occupied by the Mayan city of Potonchán, capital of the kingdom of Tabscoob.

The Villa de Santa María de la Victoria was founded on 25 March 1519 by Hernán Cortés himself, after defeating the indigenous people in what is known as the Battle of Centla. It was the first Spanish settlement in what later became Mexico.

Continuous pirate attacks that plagued the town for more than a hundred years. Additionally, the region was abandoned by the colonial authorities and consequently from 1557 the inhabitants started to gradually abandon the town in order to settle in areas away from pirate aids. This forced the Spanish authorities to found the town of San Juan Bautista (today Villahermosa) on 24 June 1564. The final blow for the Villa de Santa María de la Victoria came in 1641. The Viceroy Diego López Pacheco authorized the powers of the province of Tabasco to be changed from Santa María de la Victoria to the town of San Juan Bautista. With the passing of the time, the last inhabitants left the village.

== Foundation of Santa María de la Victoria ==
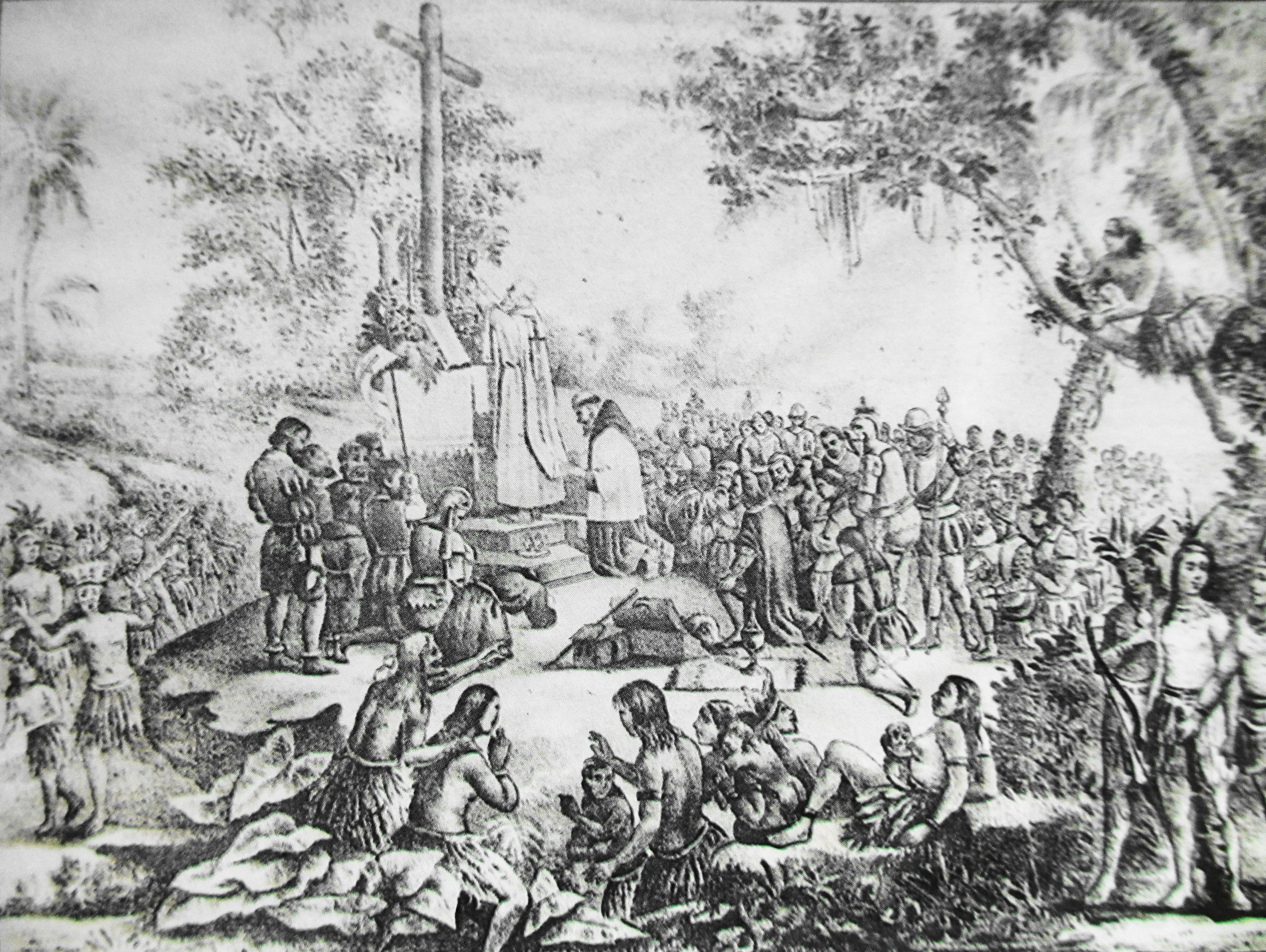
Image of Mass in Potonchán. First Mass celebrated in the territory of New Spain.

After baptising the 20 women that were presented to him, Cortés met with the chief Tabscoob and other indigenous authorities, who informed him that, in a place called Culúa, there was a very big city and there was much gold. Cortés decided to continue his journey to that place.

But before, on March 25, 1519, he founded the village Santa María de la Victoria, which would be the first Spanish settlement in New Spain, on top the Maya town of Potonchán, and named in memory of the battle fought on Lady Day. He commanded the construction of an altar for placing an image of the Virgin Mary that he decided to leave there. In addition he built in the village of Cintla or Centla a wooden cross from a ceiba, to be placed in the center of the square.

"... And with this, the conversation ceased until the next day, when the holy image of Our Lady and the cross, which we all adore, was put on the altar. The priest Fray Bartolome de Olmedo gave Mass. All the chiefs and important people were in front, and Cortés gave the name Santa María de la Victoria to that place, and thusly one now calls the town of Potonchán or Tabasco..."

— Bernal Díaz del Castillo, Historia Verdadera de la Conquista de la Nueva España (1519)

Later, on Palm Sunday, after the celebration of Mass and in the presence of indigenous authorities, Cortés says goodbye to them and continues his journey. Leaving a group of 60 soldiers in the newly founded village of Santa María de la Victoria, he gave them the mission to pacify the region. After that, Cortés left toward Culua (modern-day San Juan de Ulúa, Veracruz), in search of the riches of the great empire "...from there, where the sun sets."
