= Villahermosa =

- City
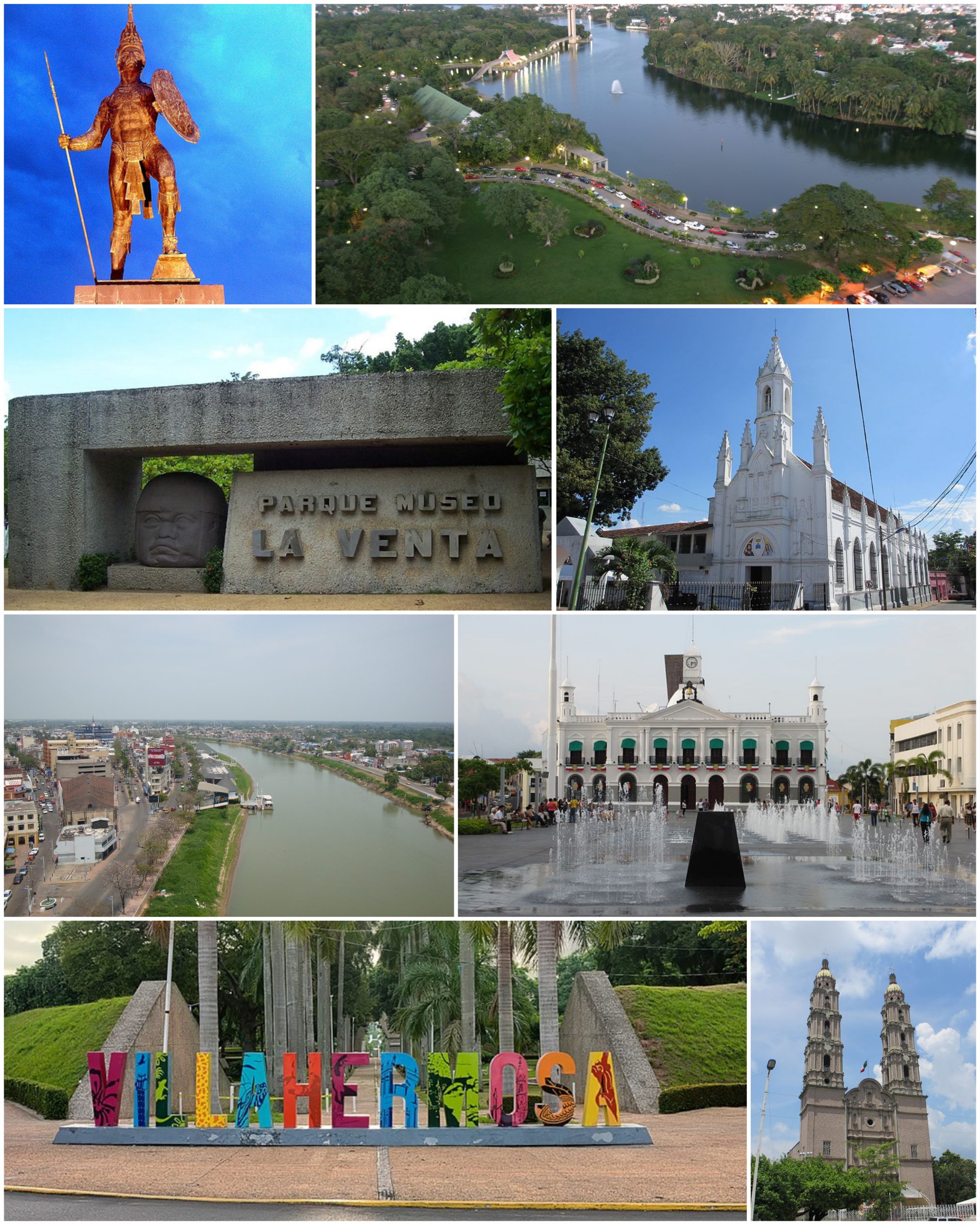
- From top to bottom, from left to right: Monument to Taabscoob, the Lagoon of Illusions, the Parque Museo La Venta, the Church of the Immaculate Conception, the Grijalva River as it passes through Villahermosa, the main square, monumental letters and the Cathedral of the Lord of Tabasco.

- Flag Coat of arms
- Nickname: The Emerald of the Southeast; Spanish: La Esmeralda del Sureste
- Location within Tabasco Location within Mexico Location within North America
- Coordinates: 17°59′21″N 92°55′41″W
- Country: Mexico
- State: Tabasco
- Municipality: Centro
- Founded: 24 June 1564

Government
  - Mayor: Yolanda Osuna Huerta

Area
  - City: 61.177 km^{2} (23.621 sq mi)
  - Urban: 63.2 km^{2} (24.4 sq mi)
  - Metro: 1,612 km^{2} (622 sq mi)
- Elevation: 20 m (66 ft)

Population (2020 census)
  - City: 340,060
  - Density: 5,558.6/km^{2} (14,397/sq mi)
  - Metro: 833,907

GDP (PPP, constant 2015 values)
  - Year: 2023
  - Total: $23.2 billion
- Time zone: UTC−6 (CST)
- Postal code: 86000 (Center)
- Website: villahermosa.gob.mx

Villahermosa (/ˌviː(j)əɛərˈmoʊsə/ VEE-(y)ə-air-MOH-sə, Spanish: [ˌbiʝaeɾˈmosa]; "beautiful town") is the capital and largest city of the Mexican state of Tabasco, and serves as the municipal seat (governing county) of the state. Located in Southeast Mexico, Villahermosa is known for its cultural history, natural resources, commercial development, and modern industrialization.

Coined La Esmeralda del Sureste ("The Emerald of the Southeast"), Villahermosa is a modern city with history dating back to the early 1500s. Its natural resources like cacao, sugarcane, bananas, tobacco, rice, and hardwood trees have made Villahermosa attractive to domestic investors. The city has become a hub for oil and gas operations in Southern Mexico and is referred to as the "Energy City of Mexico". The most recent oil discovery, at the Ogarrio oil field just 107 km west of Villahermosa, make it an important city in the production of hydrocarbons. Commercially, the city is popular with major retailers like Liverpool, Fábricas de Fráncia, Palacio de Hierro, Walmart, City Club, Costco, Soriana, Chedraui, Comercial Mexicana and Home Depot. National banks Santander Mexico and Banamex serve the city's financial needs.

== Etymology ==
In 1598, King Philip II of Spain named the city "Villa Hermosa of San Juan Bautista", and granted it use of a royal shield on its coat of arms, which is still in use today. During the city's long history, its name has changed many times. In 1916, governor Francisco J. Múgica decreed to eliminate the name of "San Juan Bautista", leaving only "Villahermosa".

=== Previous names ===
Throughout the city's history, Villahermosa has had many names:

- Villa Carmona (1564): name given by Diego de Quijada when he founded the city.
- San Juan Bautista (1565): in honor of the city's patron saint.
- Villa Felipe II: in honor of the Spanish monarch.
- Villa Hermosa de San Juan Bautista (1598): title granted by King Felipe II of Spain.
- San Juan de Villahermosa (1604): name given by the Viceroy Marquis de Montesclaros in honor of Juan de Grijalva, discoverer of Tabasco.
- Villahermosa del Puerto (1792): when Villahermosa is declared a "minor port".
- San Juan Bautista De Villahermosa (1811)
- San Juan Bautista de Tabasco (as of November 4, 1826): by decree of the State Congress.
- Villahermosa (officially instituted since February 3, 1916): by decree of the state governor Francisco J. Múgica; the official newspaper Tabasco from February 17, 1916, indicated "Villahermosa" must be written together and not separated into two words.

== Symbols of the city ==
=== Coat of arms ===
On July 24, 1598, King Philip II of Spain granted the village of San Juan Bautista the title of Villa Hermosa de San Juan Bautista, and afforded it a royal coat of arms. In 1892, State Congress adopted the city's coat of arms as the official shield of the State of Tabasco.

The shield incorporates a quarterly heraldry design with a center inescutcheon. The coat of arms depicts the Spanish Imperial Crown for King Charles V, who served as Holy Roman Emperor and King.

The first quarter gules features four castle towers representing the Kingdom of Castile, the Crown of Aragon, the Nasrid Kingdom of Granada, and the Mediterranean Sea, four territories of land and sea. The four castles refer to the four lordships that initially carved up the area after it was conquered by Alfonso X of Castile.

The second quarter argent features a military arm wielding a two-edged sword, representing Spanish power over a province.

The third quarter argent features an Aztec woman wearing a feathered skirt in shades of sinople red and green, ribbons on her forearms, and flower bouquets in each hand.

The fourth quarter gules features a crowned lion with a protruding tongue representing the ancient Kingdom of León.

The center inescutcheon features a crowned Virgin Mary dressed in gules and azure and the Pillars of Hercules tipped with globes. Written on the Pillars of Hercules is the motto “Plus Ultra“ reflecting overseas expansion. Charles V incorporated this symbolism in reference to the then-recent European discovery of America.

== Geography ==
Villahermosa is located approximately 50 kilometres (31 mi) south of the Gulf Coast and about 904 kilometres (562 mi) southeast of Mexico City. The municipality is in the center of Tabasco, which adjoins the northern municipalities of Nacajuca and Centla, and the southern municipalities of Jalapa, Teapa and the south-central municipality of Macuspana. It also borders the northwestern part of the State of Chiapas. The geographical coordinates of the municipality are north 18-20', south 17-43' north latitude; 92-35', west 93-15' west.

The urban area of Villahermosa occupies 61,177 km2 while the territorial extension of the municipality occupies 1,612 km2, which corresponds to 6.9% of the total state territory, occupying 7th place on the municipal extension scale. The territorial division of the municipality of Centro consists of a city, 7 villas, 1 village, 132 rancheries, and 117 boroughs (colonial) and fractions. The municipality contains 13 regional development centers (CORs) where most economic and social activities are carried out, including Villa Ocuiltzapoltán, Villa Macultepec, Villa Parrilla 1a. Section, Villa Subteniente García, Rosario Beaches, Villa New People of Roots, Poblado Dos Montes, Los Boquerones, Villa Luis Gil Pérez, and Villa Tamulte de Las Sabanas.

Today, Villahermosa is a modern, industrialized city.

=== Natural resources ===
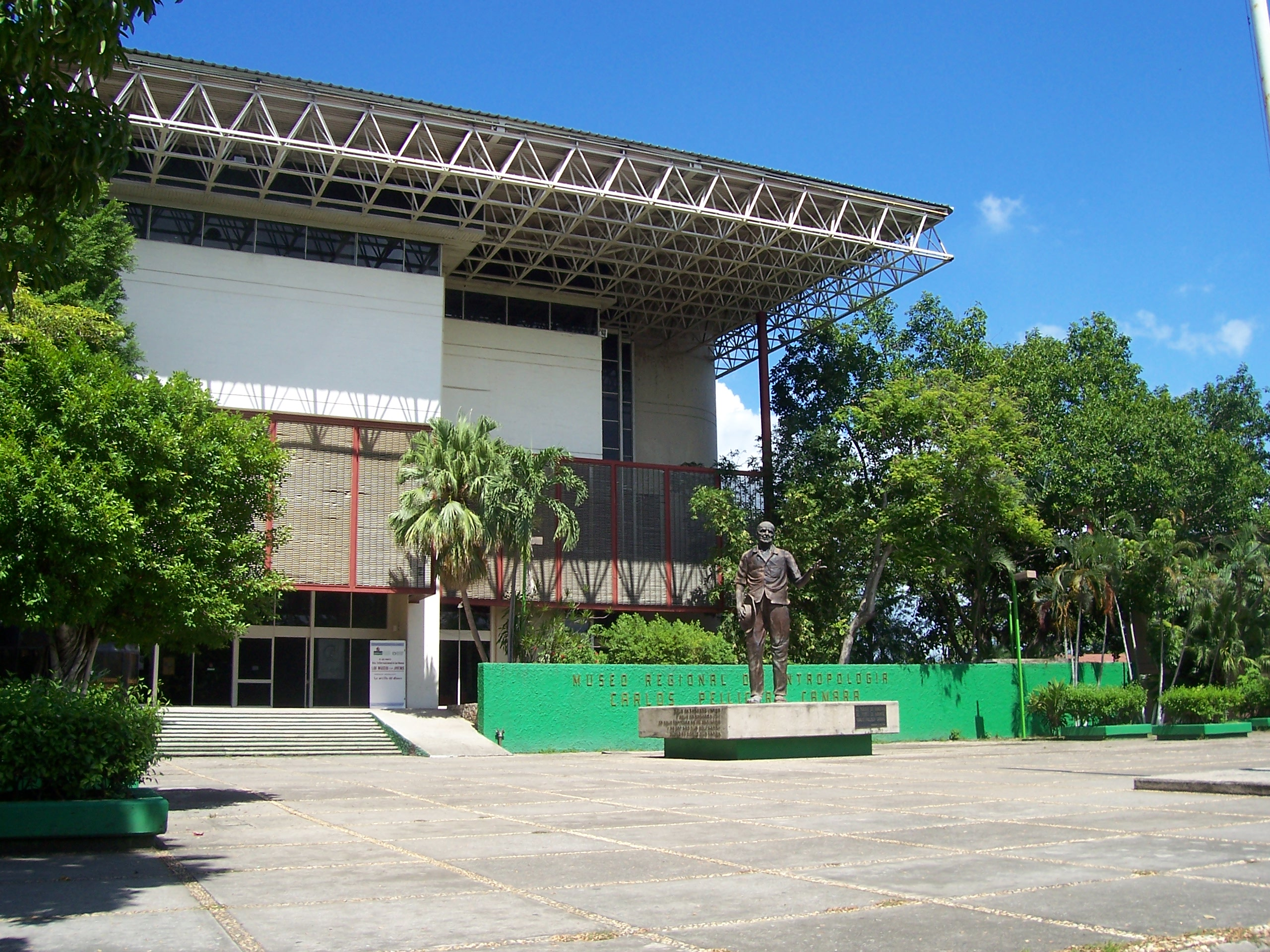
Museo de Antropología Carlos Pellicer

Villahermosa is located in the southeast of Mexico, between the rivers Grijalva and Carrizal. The average elevation of the city is 10 meters above sea level. The city also has several lagoons, the largest and most important of them being La Laguna de las Ilusiones ("Lagoon of Illusions").

The most important city thoroughfares are Paseo Tabasco, Gregorio Méndez Avenue, the Periférico, Ruiz Cortines Avenue, and Pino Suárez Avenue.

=== Climate ===
Like most of Tabasco, Villahermosa has a tropical monsoon climate (Am). Temperatures during the spring and summer seasons can reach upwards of 40 °C (104 °F), with humidity levels hovering around 30% during the same period (for total humidity-adjusted temperatures in the high forties). During its short "winter", Villahermosa's climate is very humid but daytime temperatures decrease to around 28 °C (82 °F).

In October 2007, Villahermosa suffered its worst flood in recorded history. Several hundred thousand people were displaced because of flooded homes.

Climate data for Villahermosa (1991–2020), extremes 1951-present
Month	Jan	Feb	Mar	Apr	May	Jun	Jul	Aug	Sep	Oct	Nov	Dec	Year
Record high °C (°F)	38.0 (100.4)	38.5 (101.3)	41.5 (106.7)	43.1 (109.6)	43.5 (110.3)	42.0 (107.6)	40.0 (104.0)	40.2 (104.4)	39.5 (103.1)	39.0 (102.2)	38.0 (100.4)	37.0 (98.6)	43.5 (110.3)
Mean daily maximum °C (°F)	28.2 (82.8)	29.8 (85.6)	32.7 (90.9)	34.9 (94.8)	35.8 (96.4)	34.6 (94.3)	34.0 (93.2)	34.2 (93.6)	33.1 (91.6)	31.3 (88.3)	29.9 (85.8)	28.5 (83.3)	32.3 (90.1)
Daily mean °C (°F)	23.6 (74.5)	24.5 (76.1)	26.6 (79.9)	28.5 (83.3)	29.6 (85.3)	29.3 (84.7)	28.9 (84.0)	28.9 (84.0)	28.4 (83.1)	27.1 (80.8)	25.7 (78.3)	24.1 (75.4)	27.1 (80.8)
Mean daily minimum °C (°F)	19.3 (66.7)	19.4 (66.9)	20.6 (69.1)	22.2 (72.0)	23.6 (74.5)	23.9 (75.0)	23.6 (74.5)	23.7 (74.7)	23.5 (74.3)	22.7 (72.9)	21.3 (70.3)	19.9 (67.8)	22.0 (71.6)
Record low °C (°F)	10.0 (50.0)	11.0 (51.8)	13.0 (55.4)	15.0 (59.0)	13.0 (55.4)	19.0 (66.2)	19.0 (66.2)	20.0 (68.0)	19.5 (67.1)	16.0 (60.8)	12.0 (53.6)	10.5 (50.9)	10.0 (50.0)
Average precipitation mm (inches)	72.0 (2.83)	59.6 (2.35)	32.0 (1.26)	10.1 (0.40)	5.9 (0.23)	142.4 (5.61)	110.2 (4.34)	105.7 (4.16)	151.7 (5.97)	147.8 (5.82)	135.3 (5.33)	121.7 (4.79)	1,094.4 (43.09)
Average precipitation days (≥ 1.0 mm)	6	5	3	4	4	10	10	10	10	10	9	8	89
Average relative humidity (%)	78	75	72	61.6	71	78	79	80	84.8	83	81	79	76.9
Mean monthly sunshine hours	184.9	201.6	241.8	258.0	313.9	246.0	241.8	235.6	171.0	182.9	177.0	148.8	2,603.3
Source 1: Servicio Meteorológico National (humidity 1981–2000)
Source 2: Deutscher Wetterdienst (sun, 1961–1990) (Note: Station ID for Villahermosa, TAB. is 76743 Use this station ID to locate the sunshine duration)

== Demographics ==
According to the World Population Review 2021, there are 913,606 inhabitants in the Metropolitan area of Villahermosa, a 1.69% growth rate. Although the first inhabitants settled in 1557, the official occupation occurred on June 24, 1564.

== History ==
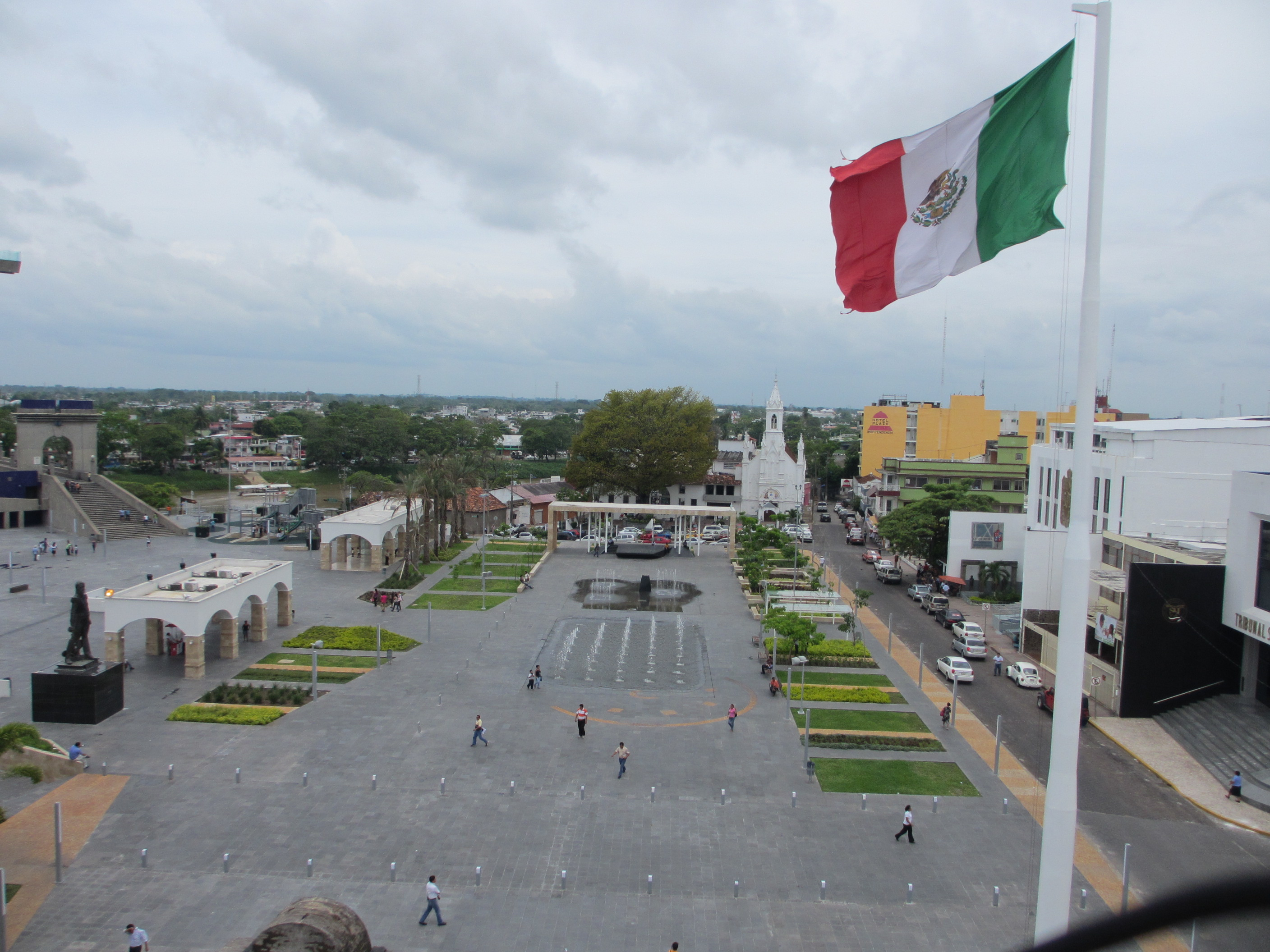
Main square in the Historic Center

Founded officially on 24 June 1564 by the Spanish explorer Diego de Quijada on the banks of the Grijalva River under the name of Villa Hermosa, in 1826 the village was raised to the rank of city under the name of San Juan Bautista de la Villa Hermosa (Saint John the Baptist). During the French intervention in Mexico, French troops occupied the city in 1863. In 1916, the governor of Tabasco, Francisco J. Múgica, ordered the restoration of the city's name to Villahermosa.

=== Colonial Age ===
The Villa Carmona was later christened San Juan Bautista and was divided into neighborhoods. The oldest of them was the neighborhood of Esquipulas, on the ridge of the hill of Esquipulas and around the Church of Our Lord of Esquipulas, with his image of Christ black, which had been brought from Esquipulas, Guatemala.

By 1596, Lazaro Suárez de Córdova was Mayor of Tabasco and continued to dispatch in Santa Maria de la Victoria as the capital, and because the pirates had been attacking much of the coast of Tabasco, it commands to build in San Juan Bautista (today Villahermosa) the Fort House or Royal Warehouse. This was in order to defend the population and safeguard the flows Real. The Royal Warehouse was located on what are the current streets of Juárez, Reforma, Madero and Lerdo.

On July 24, 1598, the King granted the city of San Juan Bautista the title of Villa Hermosa de San Juan Bautista as well as a royal shield, which currently identifies the state of Tabasco and is one of the oldest in the Americas.

In 1604, the Mayor of Tabasco Juan de Miranda requested the Viceroy Juan de Mendoza and Luna to authorize the powers to be changed from Santa Maria de la Victoria to Saint John the Baptist (now Villahermosa) in addition to requesting that the name of the city be changed to San Juan de Villahermosa, authorizing the change of name of the city, not so the transfer of powers.

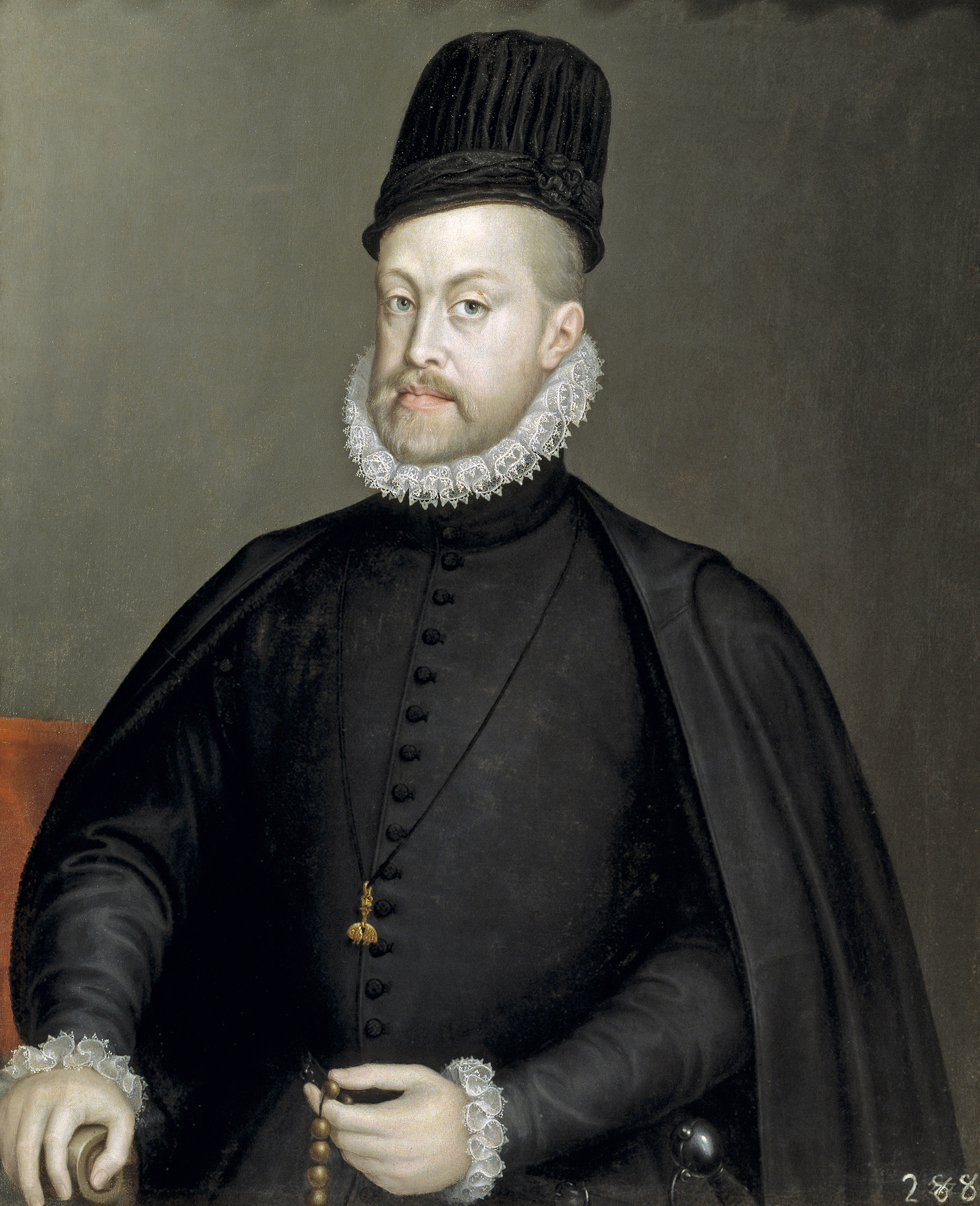
Philip II of Spain

King Philip II of Spain gave the city the title of Villa Hermosa as well as a Coat of Tabasco's Royal Shield. As the pirate attacks did not cease, and they continually destroyed and raided the village of Santa María de la Victoria, in the year 1619, the change of the powers of the province to San Juan Bautista before the Marquis de Guadalcázar Diego Fernández de Córdoba, authorizing it on December 3 of that same year. However, was re-established. The move was not made because many residents did not want to leave Santa Maria de la Victoria.

=== Capital of Tabasco for the first time ===
In 1640, due to the continuous pirate attacks on the village of Santa María de la Victoria, the authorities of the Province requested the Viceroy Diego López Pacheco and Portugal to change the capital of the Province to San Juan de Villahermosa, which the Viceroy authorized on 3 February 1641. The transfer of powers took effect on June 24 of that same year, making Villahermosa the new capital of the Province of Tabasco. The "Fortín de la Encarnación" was immediately built in what is now the park of "the birds" on the corner that forms the current streets of May 5 and Zaragoza at the foot of the hill of "La Encarnación".

In 1677, as Mayor Diego de Loyola, the privateers fiercely attacked the capital Villahermosa de San Juan Bautista, forcing the authorities to leave the city and transfer the powers to the village of Tacotalpa, which served as capital of the province for the next 118 years. On June 21, 1677, the Mayor of Tabasco informed the Viceroy that the fear of pirate invasions had caused the depopulation of entire villages such as Cunduacán, and that Villahermosa, which was the capital, had depopulated, too.

In 1688, lookouts, trenches and fortifications were built in Villahermosa to protect the desolated city from pirate attacks. However, in 1711, Villahermosa was again fiercely attacked by English pirates, who set fire to the Royal Warehouse that was the Government House, and the defenders had to take refuge in the Fortín de la Encarnación, which withstood the attack, though the pirates burned down many houses, leaving the town in ruins.

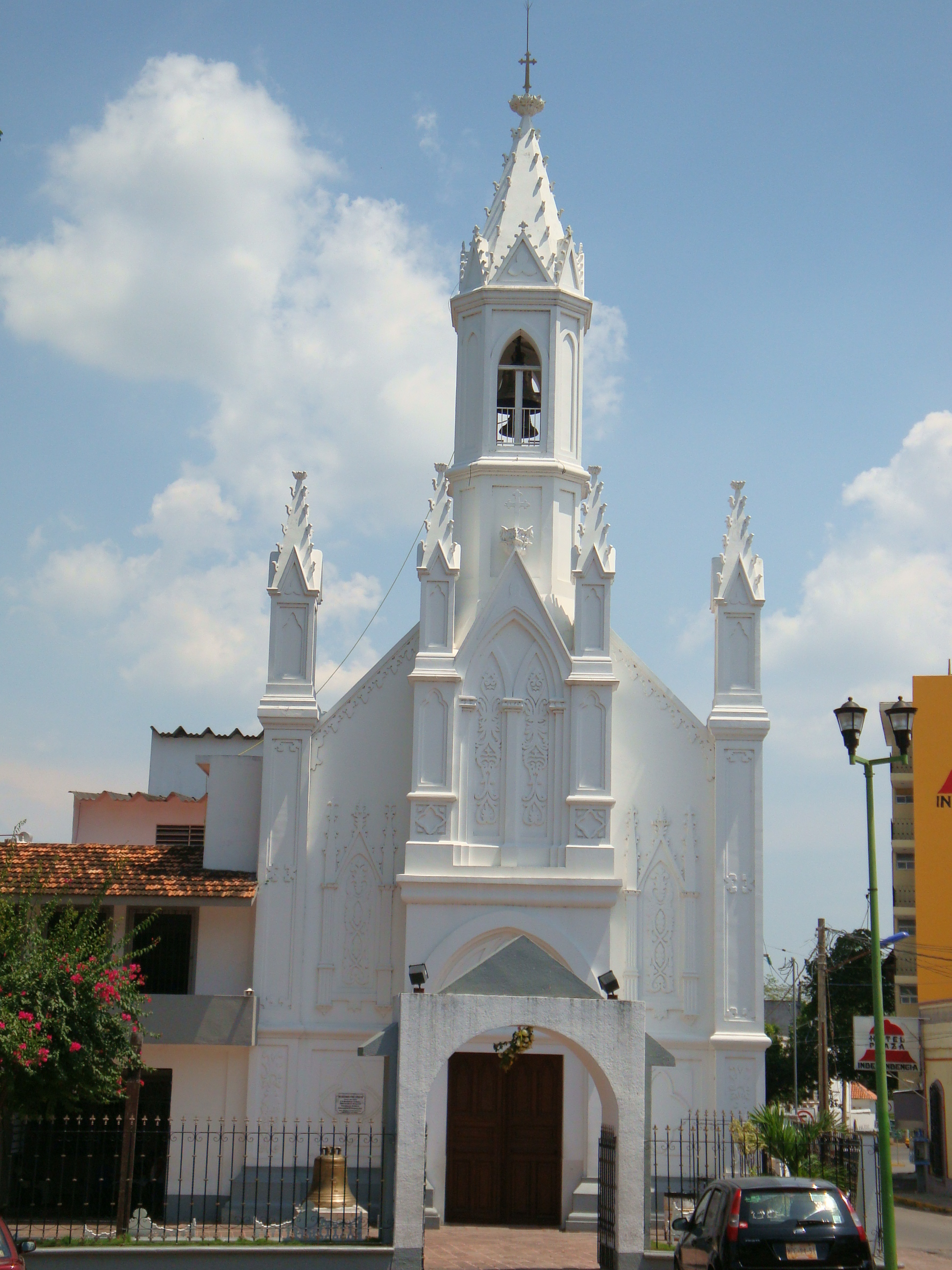
Church of the Conception, built in 1800 in front of the Plaza de Armas de Villahermosa

It was not until July 16, 1717, when the then-Mayor of Tabasco Alonso Felipe Andrade, at the head of an army of Tabasco and Veracruz forces, attacked the pirates on the Island of Tris (now the island of Carmen) which at the time belonged to Tabasco. Though Andrade was killed, the Tabasco forces expelled the pirates and founded that same day the military post of Nuestra Señora del Carmen (today City of Carmen). However, in 1757, the English pirates counterattacked the military post of Nuestra Señora del Carmen, setting it on fire and destroying it, and then re-attacking the Tabasco coasts.

Finally, in 1785, the Tabasco militias, commanded by Captain Juan de Amestoy and Lieutenant Francisco Interiano, defeated and permanently evicted the English from Carmen Island.

=== Capital of Tabasco for the second time ===
In January 1795 the Viceroy Miguel de la Grúa Talamanca authorized the change of the powers of the Province of Tabasco from Tacotalpa to Villa Hermosa de San Juan Bautista, taking effect on Monday, August 15 of that year. Thus, after 118 years, Villahermosa is again the capital of Tabasco.

The neighborhood of La Punta or La Concepción was the next growth step of San Juan that transcended the first natural boundaries of the site. Developed around the church of the Immaculate Conception - "La Conchita"-, the neighborhood was also known as La Punta for being at the southern end of the city, on a hillside of the hill of La Eminence, between the Grijalva River, the lagoon of La Pólvora and the primary trace. The last district dating from the late colonial era, from the early years of the nineteenth century, was the neighborhood of La Santa Cruz, with its center in the church of the same name. This neighborhood was developed on marshy and grassland land north of the city center.

The city lived peacefully during the last years of the Colony, being an important river port.

=== 19th century ===
In November 1808, the Viceroy of the [New Spain] don Pedro de Garibay arranged for elections to be made for the first Town Hall of Villahermosa, verifying the solemn installation of this first Town Hall on 1 January 1809.

=== The Libertarian Struggle ===
During the struggle for Mexican independence, few libertarian movements aroused in the state capital due to the fierce control exercised by colonial authorities over the province. It was not until 1814 that José María Jiménez Garrido launched the cry of insurrection. However, he was imprisoned by the governor and sent to San Juan de Ulúa.

On 5 July 1821, Villahermosa was taken by the independentists headed by José María Jiménez Garrido and Luis Timoteo Sánchez and at 2 p.m. in the Plaza de Armas de Villahermosa Plaza Mayor, Sánchez proclaimed independence and unveiled the "Glorious Independent System". However, Governor Angel Del Toro managed to stifle the rebellion and the royalists recaptured the city.

=== Proclamation of Independence ===
On September 7, 1821, Colonel Juan Nepomuceno Fernández Mantecón, who came from Veracruz, fought a slight battle in the village of Tamulté de la Sabana, defeating the Spanish army and planting himself in the vicinity of Saint John the Baptist (San Juan Bautista), which led to the escape of the last colonial governor of Tabasco Angel Del Toro, and triumphantly entered the city proclaiming the National Independence.

Juan Nepomuceno Fernández Mantecón" paraded with the troops by the royal road to Atasta and Tamulté (today Av. 27 de Febrero), to Cruz Verde (today Av. Francisco Javier Mina), folded on Yerbabuena street (today Iguala), to the hill and street of the "Encarnación" (today 5 may), occupying the new barracks on Today's Independence Street, the Old Barracks, the Town Hall and the Plaza de Armas de Villahermosa' Plaza de Armas where they proclaimed Tabasco's independence from the Spanish crown. Completing 302 years and six months of Spanish rule in the state.

The next day, September 8, at 9 a.m. in the Plaza de Armas de Villahermosa' Plaza de Armas de San Juan Bautista, the local authorities adopted the Iguala Plan and signed the annexation to the new nation, thus remaining Tabasco attached to Mexico. The festivities culminated in a mass and a "Te Deum" in the hermitage of the Conception.

=== First Constitutional Town Hall ===
Shortly after the consummation of the Independence movement, in November 1821, the first Constitutional Council was elected in accordance with the Constitution of 1812, being elected as the first Don Francisco Betancourt Mayor. Taking office on 1 January 1822. •'Change's name and rank's. In solemn meeting, held on October 27, 1826, the Congress of the State, decreed the renaming of the capital city, determining that from November 4, 1826, the city of Villahermosa would be called San Juan Bautista de Tabasco, granting it in addition to the rank of "city".

=== Cholera epidemic ===
On November 26, 1833, the epidemic of Cólera-cólera murbus was declared in Saint John the Baptist, and can be controlled until September 1834. A total of 2,500 people died in the state capital and according to the report of the "Ministry of Justice and Ecclesiastical Business", which appeared in the official newspaper of August 25, 1849, 4,020 people died statewide.

On December 16 i arrived at Saint John the Baptist, and the cholera epidemic was in all its might, and another calamity no less terrible, the civil war, was on the eve of the outbreak..." Juan Federico Maximilian. Baron of Waldeck."

The Civil War and the Separation of Tabasco VT Tabasco Separation Federalist Revolution (Tabasco) The succession of violent events began in 1833, when the civil war began in the state, between centralists and federalists with the victory of the centralists in 1834. Later in 1839, the Federalist Revolution which culminated in November 1840, with the takeover of the city and the victory of the Tabasque federalists led by the Cuban Francisco de Sentmanat, the jalisciense Juan Pablo Anaya and the Tabasqueño Fernando Nicolás Maldonado. After the federalist revolution, the Texan navy that had supported Juan Pablo Anaya demanded payment for collaborating in the victory, and in the end of achieving it, began a bombardment of the city of San Juan Bautista. The bombing was halted two days later thanks to negotiations by the governor Pedro Requena. The triumph of the Tabasque federalists would annoy the president Anastasio Bustamante, who on February 11, 1841, ordered heavy economic sanctions for the state, taking the State Congress and the governor José Víctor Jiménez the decision to decreeing the Tabasco separation from Mexico on 13 February 1841. Granting the local Congress to the governor José Víctor Jiménez the functions of President. creating two departments: the Treasury department and the War and Navy department. The various revolts and seasoned military stakes between 1833 and 1841 left the city heavily destroyed.

=== Mexican–American War ===
On October 23, 1846, U.S. forces invaded Tabasco, and on the 25 thresemonious day they arrived at the capital San Juan Bautista, which was defended by the Governor of the state and Military Commander John Baptist Traconis, who was in command of the Tabaquean militias and the Acayucan Battalion. The commander Matthew Perry demanded the surrender of the square, to which the governor John Baptist Traconis replied that the square would defend it with life, so they could initiate the attack, the bombing was not expected, it was 14:15, developed between 25 and 26 October, which is known as the First Battle of Tabasco.

Due to the resilience of the city, they indiscriminately bombed Saint John the Baptist, destroying their main buildings such as neighborhood churches, public prison, theater and room houses of the three neighborhoods. However due to the defense of the authorities and villagers, they failed to take the city. This would be the only battle won by Mexican forces over the Americans, and was achieved due to the expertise of Colonel Traconis and to the value of the Tobacco military volunteering, headed among others by: Miguel Bruno, Manuel Escofié, José Julián Dueñas, Juan Duque de Estrada, Simón Sarlat García, Manuel Plascencia, and many more. The Americans retreated to the port of Border where they set up an eight-month blockade, to prevent food and bastimento from reaching Saint John the Baptist.

Faced with this, the governor John Bautista Traconis asked the federal government for help in the purchase of war equipment and materials, in order to protect the square from a second invasion, however, in the face of the federal government's refusal, Traconis declared Tabasco separated from the Mexican nation. However his proposal was unresonated, and Traconis was removed from the office of governor, assuming the functions Justo Santa Anna.

On June 16, 1847, the Americans returned to Saint John the Baptist, staging the Second Battle of Tabasco, in which the Americans re-bomb the city, which without bastimentos or food, fell into the hands of the invaders on June 15, having to flee the authorities to the village of Tacotalpa which was named state capital. The Americans took the city and appointed Commander Van Brunt governor of the state.

However, on July 22, the Tobacco guerrillas led by Miguel Bruno, which gave them no truce or respite, began performing in the city. On the 26th, they arrived in Saint John the Baptist. Commander Bigelow who replaced Van Brunt in government, tried more reinforcements to defeat the Tobacco forces. Due to the strong Tobacco guerrillas, and the reckless courage of the Tabasqueños organized by Colonel John Bautista Traconis first, and the governor Justo Santa Anna afterwards, were the causes that gave the national weapons in [Tabasco] the triumph about the Americans, on July 22, 1847. Defeated, the Americans vacated the city in which they stayed for 35 days, after which they withdrew not without first setting fire and raving much of the city, leaving it completely destroyed and burned.

=== French intervention ===
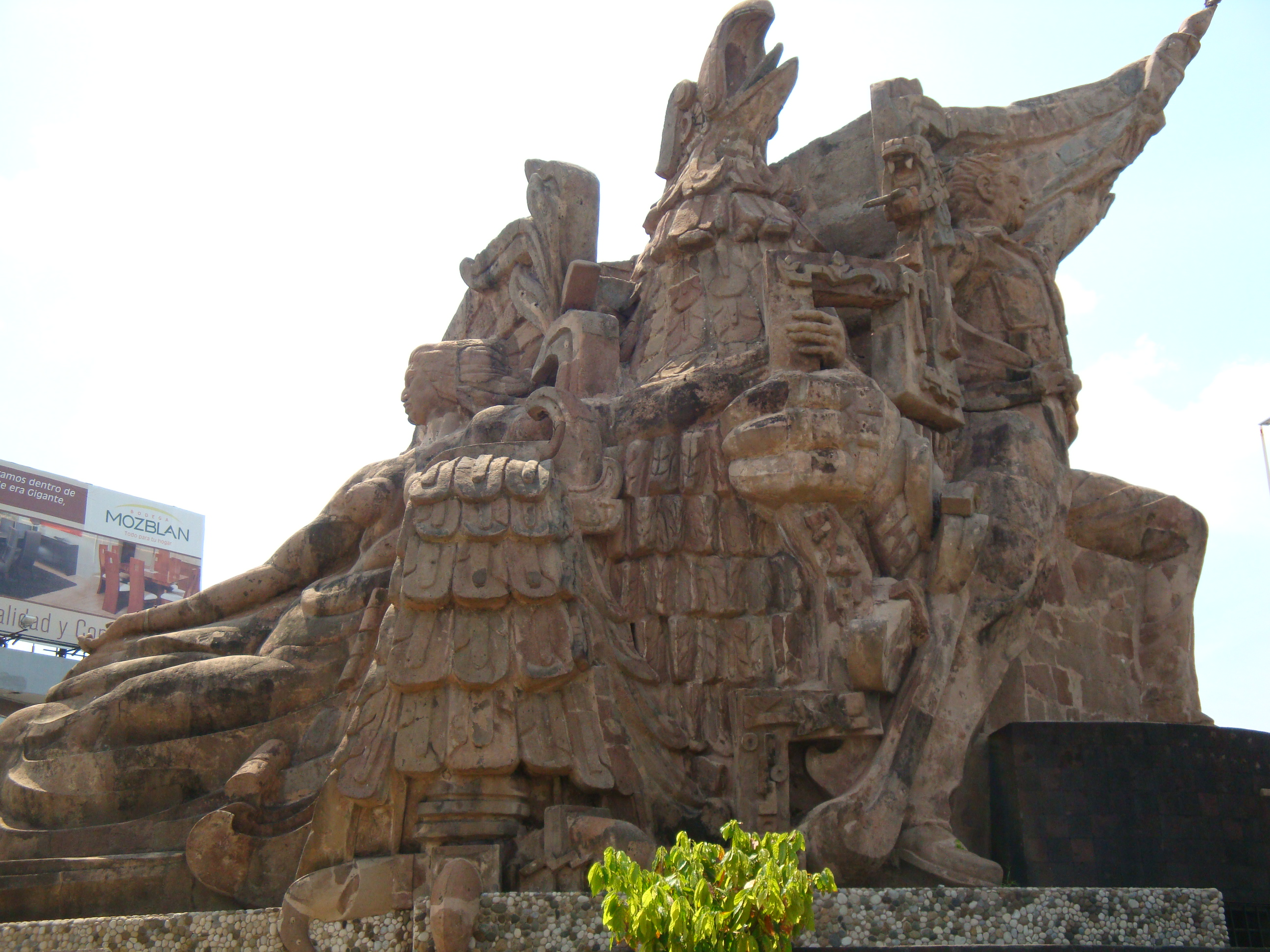
Monumento a Andrés Sánchez Magallanes, which honors the victory against the French army

Also, in 1863 and 1864, both French interventionist forces and Mexican pro-imperialist forces again destroyed much of the buildings of San Juan. On 18 June 1863, the French army under the command of Eduardo González Arévalo, dawned before the capital of the state San Juan Bautista, initiating a heavy bombardment and landing with 150 men. A line of defense was established from the square of Ruiz to the stream El Jícaro, the bombardment was so intense that forced the retreat of the defenders to the outskirts of the city, taking control of the invaders of the city and establishing its barracks in the building called "The Principal" which had been the Royal Warehouse during the Colony. From the capital, the French invaders would begin the struggle to control the entire state of Tabasco. However, the Tobacco forces would gradually go back to the ground.

Six months later, on December 2, 1863, the Tabasque Republican forces under Colonel Gregorio Méndez Magaña begin bombing the city of San Juan Bautista. The prelude to the final assault began with the harassment of the capital, and was attacked from different flanks by Juan Morales, Lino Merino, Narciso Sáenz, and Pedro Fuentes who by the end of 1863 had closed the fence over the state capital.

The final assault on the capital began on 13 January 1864, and as the enemy became closer, various battles and skirmishes took place, in what is known as the [Saint John the Baptist's Take] in a street-by-street fight. Republican forces gradually gained ground and by January 18 were in the center of the capital, causing French troops to retreat, entrenching themselves in the Royal Warehouse known as "The Principal". It was fought until February 25, when the Strong House or The Principal began to gun down, and on February 27, when the dawn broke, the French invaders undertook the retreat leaving the state capital, this glorious date for national weapons since this was the first region from which the French invaders were expelled from the national territory. Churches and buildings rebuilt after the French bombing had to be rebuilt after this new aggression.

=== Twentieth and twenty-first centuries ===
==== Mexican Revolution in Tabasco ====
The 1890s and 1900s witnessed the first notable expansions of this colonial city. However, during the [Mexican Revolution in Tabasco', the political and social instability that characterized Mexico, was also reflected in the state capital, where in that period, there were 13 governors and in 1918 there were two governors and two state congresses at the same time. On June 28, 1911, he made his triumphant entrance to Saint John the Baptist, the revolutionary contingent of the Chontalpa under Sunday C. Magaña.

During the Revolution, on August 28, 1914 Luis Felipe Domínguez at the head of the Usumacinta Brigade, he entered the capital San Juan Bautista, taking office of the government on 31 August, which stunned the struggle between the defatuent factions Revolutionary. on September 2, the generals Carlos Greene, Pedro C. Colorado, [Ramón Sosa Torres], Isidro Cortés and [José Domingo Ramírez Garrido], entered the state capital, with the arrival of the chontalpa revolutionaries, there were suffoals and terrors in the city. The general Carlos Greene took office in government, however, the Donetists attacked the state capital, causing the authorities to leave Saint John the Baptist because they protested for "electoral fraud" formed their Congress and settled in Amatitan, recognizing Luis Felipe Domínguez as constitutional governor and brought before the Senate of the Republic, a case of conflict of powers, since there are two governors and two Congresses at the same time. In 1919 Carlos Greene with the help of [Tomás Garrido Canabal" Tomás Garrido] defeats the Donetists and will recapture the state capital.

He had just finished the revolutionary movement, then there was a strong and transcendent re-arrangement of the socio-political and reorganization classes of the Mexican state. The war known as "Christian" spread throughout the country, and in [Tabasco] it had its own manifestations. By government decree of February 3, 1916, the city was renamed "Villahermosa", stating that the name should be written together and not separated as it was in place.

==== Delahuertista rebellion in Tabasco ====
In 1923 the general Adolfo de la Huerta protested against the imposition of the presidential candidacy of [Plutarco Elías Calles], which caused the landowners to rise up in arms in various parts of the country. In Tabasco, in mid-December the homeless men rose in arms in the port of Frontera (Tabasco)' Frontera against the governor Tomás Garrido Canabal and Alvaro Obregón, while the general Carlos Greene joined the movement, rising in arms in the Chontalpa.

On January 10, 1924, at the head of 2,500 men, the generals Carlos Greene and Fernando Segovia besieged and took Villahermosa the capital of the state, without being contained by forces loyal to the President Alvaro Obreg'ón) Obregón, commanded by Generals Vicente González and Miguel Henríquez Guzmán, leading to the escape of the governor Tomás Garrido Canabal, who had to hide for a few days and then left the city at night in a cayuco. The delahuertists appointed as governor Manuel Antonio Romero who occupied the governorship from January 21 to June 7, 1924, when the rebellion ended when the state was attacked by federal forces and defeated the deserters.

==== Garridism ====
This time began in 1928 with the arrival of Tomás Garrido Canabal in the state government. Several times Governor of Tabasco, he created the organization "red shirts" which, in addition to his political activity of support, deployed a paramilitary battle against the Catholic Church in the state. As authority he expelled the bishop, the priests and decreed several prohibitions concerning worship, religious feasts, Catholic funeral rites, including domestic worship and even the mere mention of God. He closed the temples and gave them a new use, turning them into "rationalist" schools, military barracks or libraries. Later, the temples, the center of the old quarters, were demolished. The images were burned, but the Christians hid several of them in the "mountain", including the black Christ of Esquipulas and also the image of the Virgin Mary brought by Hernán Cortés' Courtesy. Life linked to worship and other religious celebrations virtually disappeared in Garrido's years of authority, whose influence he left feeling even after his last governorship in 1934.

==== Contemporary era ====
In the 1940s and 1950s, the expansion of Villahermosa was made up of developments by state governments and landowners who prepared and fractioned land that had previously been agricultural, grassland or grassland use forest, thus creating the first boroughs (colonial). Additionally, the installation of drains, stormwater ducts, etc. began to change also the physiognomy of some old streets. Juan Perez Arrollave, an Infantry Lieutenant who participated in the Mexican Revolution, was as municipal president from 1946 to 1950 and a personal friend of Plutarco Elias Calles.

The old Saint John the Baptist now became the "center" of a larger city. The babbling of a new urban phenomenon began to manifest itself: metropolization.

When Tabasco entered the "age of capital" – fully integrating into the country's economic development through oil exploitation and the construction of road, hydro-agricultural and hydroelectric infrastructure in the 1950s-1960s – Villahermosa began an important commercial development. Towns such as Tamulté, Atasta, and Tierra Colorada became populous boroughs (colonias) of the new city.

By 1970, Villahermosa was considered a modern city due to its architectural dynamism that began in the last century, when the state of Tabasco became one of the main oil regions of the country, which changed the urban geography of Villahermosa.

Buildings and large recreation centers changed the physiognomy of the state capital, being the area called Tabasco 2000, the main area of progress, the best example of the rejuvenated city. Places located in Tabasco 2000 include the Municipal Powers, the Administrative Center of Government, office buildings, banks, hotels, restaurants, shopping squares, and residential areas.

== Tourism ==
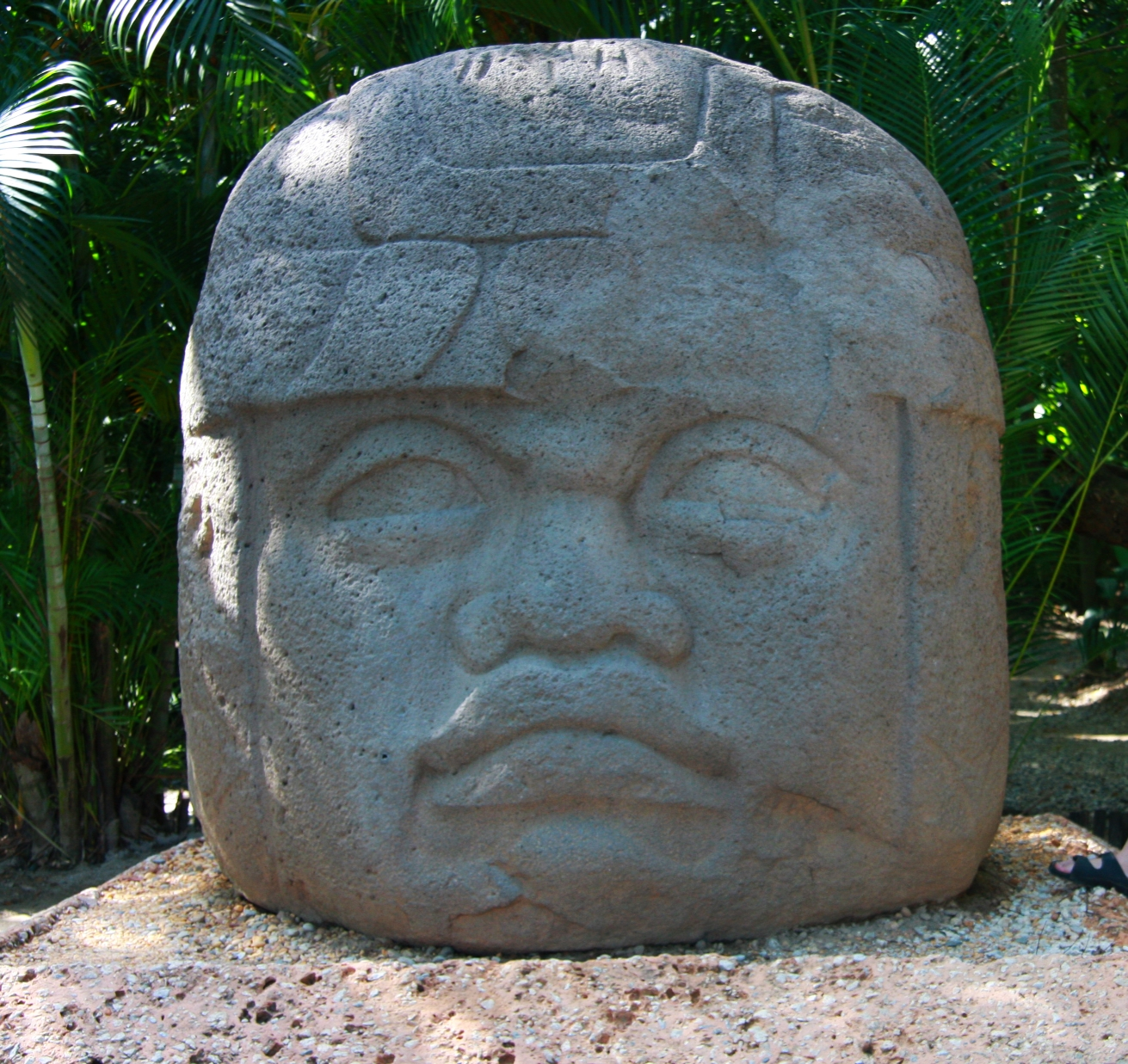
Olmec Head in La Venta Museum-Park

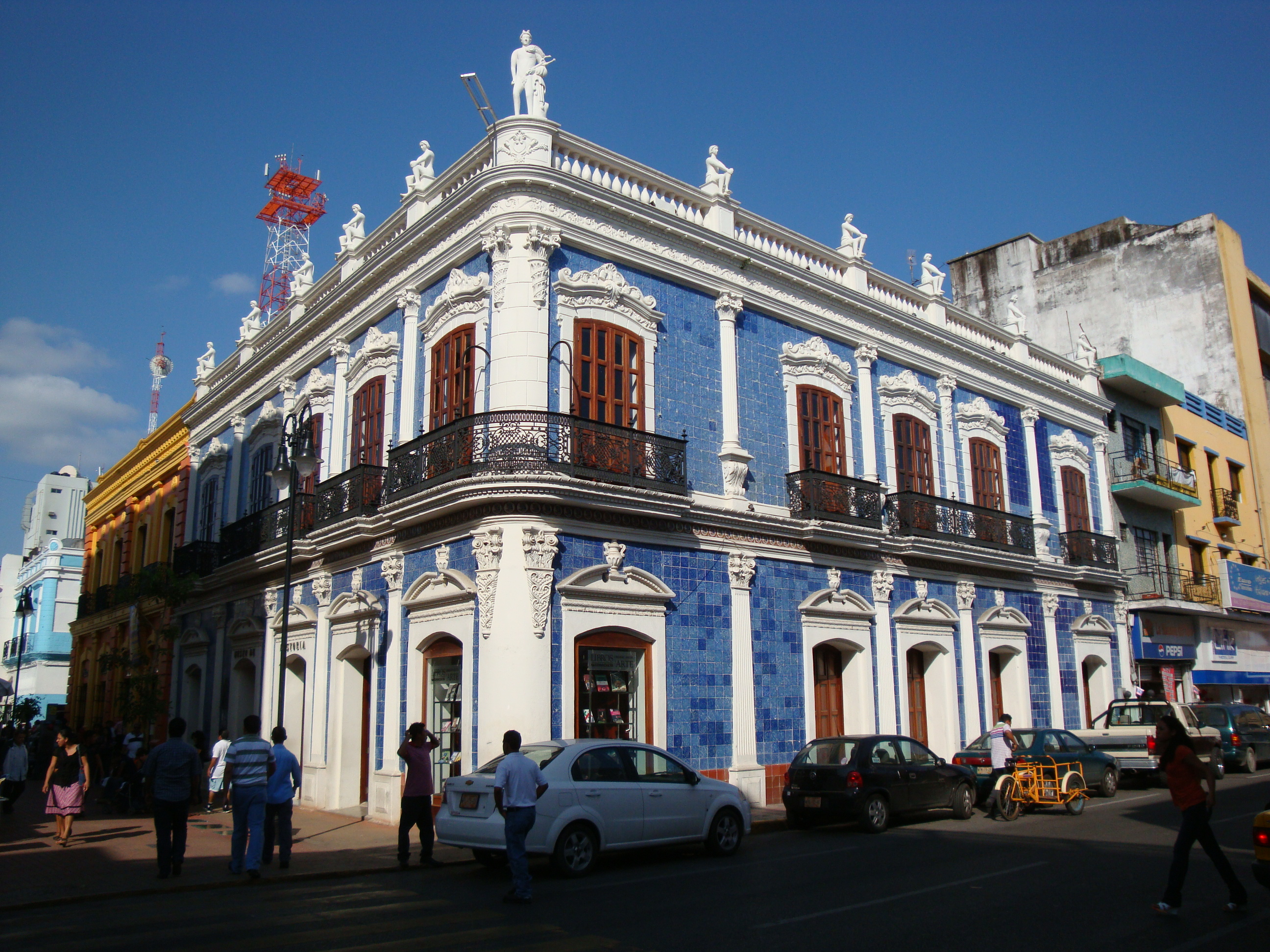
"Casa de los azulejos", built in 1890 in the Historic centre of Villahermosa, combines Gothic and Moorish styles.

La Venta Museum-Park, which includes a small zoo, has the most important collection of Olmec artifacts.

Other sights include:

- Esperanza Iris Theatre.
- Plaza de Armas (main square)
- Zona Luz (city centre)
- Catedral del Señor de Tabasco (Cathedral of the Lord of Tabasco).
- Tomás Garrido Canabal Park
- La Venta (site museum)
- Yumká (zoo where animals roam freely).
- La Choca Park.
- Parque Tabasco - a 'must see' during the Feria festivities.
- Papagayo Children's Museum.
- Musevi

== Transportation ==
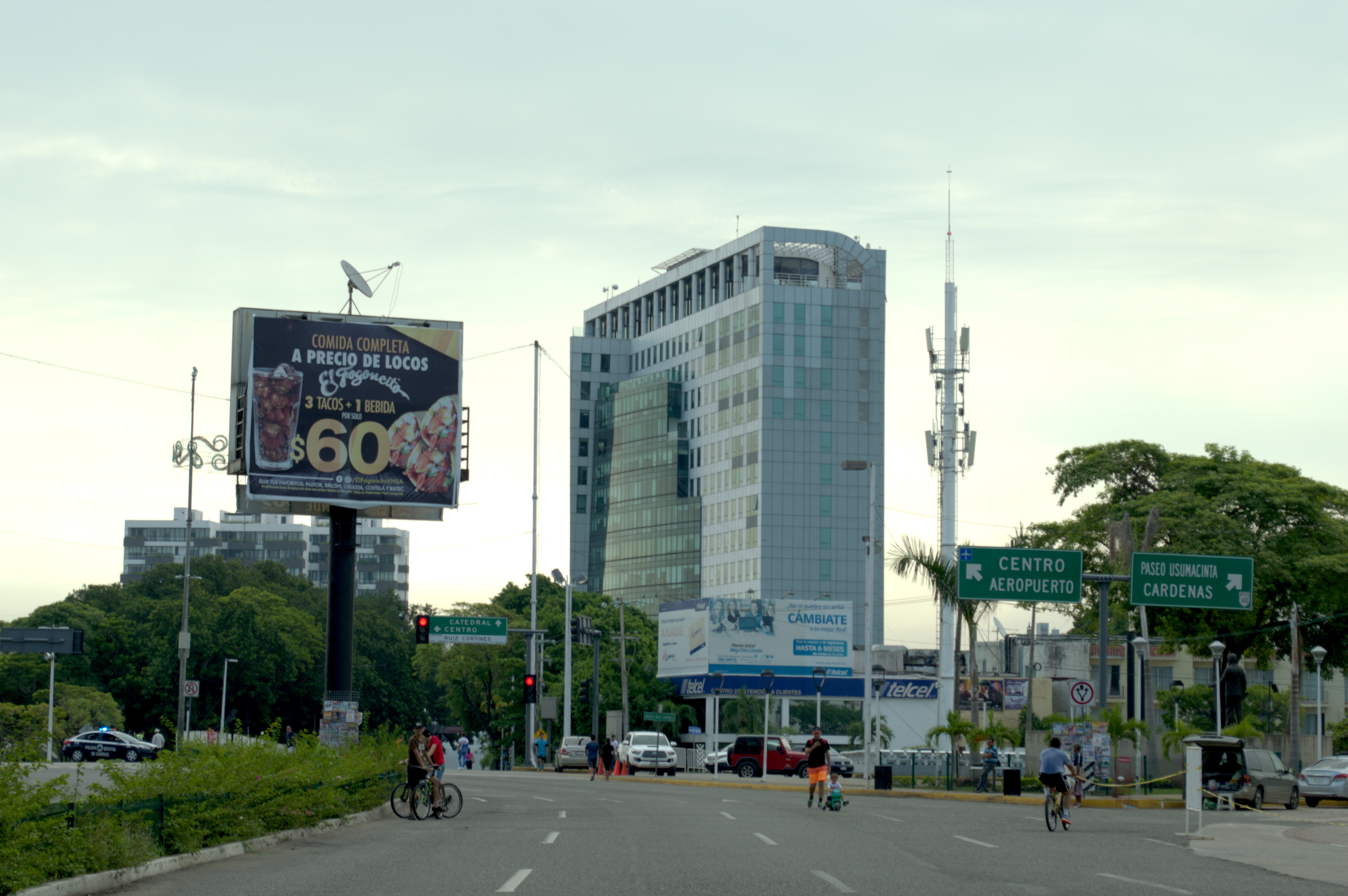
Intersection between Av. Ruiz Cortínez and Paseo Tabasco

The city is served by several national air carriers. Its airport, the Villahermosa International Airport, is operated by Aeropuertos del Sureste de México (ASUR) and has recently seen a significant expansion. This airport was the destination for the 1929 Mexicana inaugural flight. The city is the closest destination to the ancient Mayan ruins at Palenque. Airlines providing flights to/from the airport are: Aeromar, Aeroméxico, United, Viva, and previously by the defunct Mexicana de Aviación and Interjet.

== Education ==
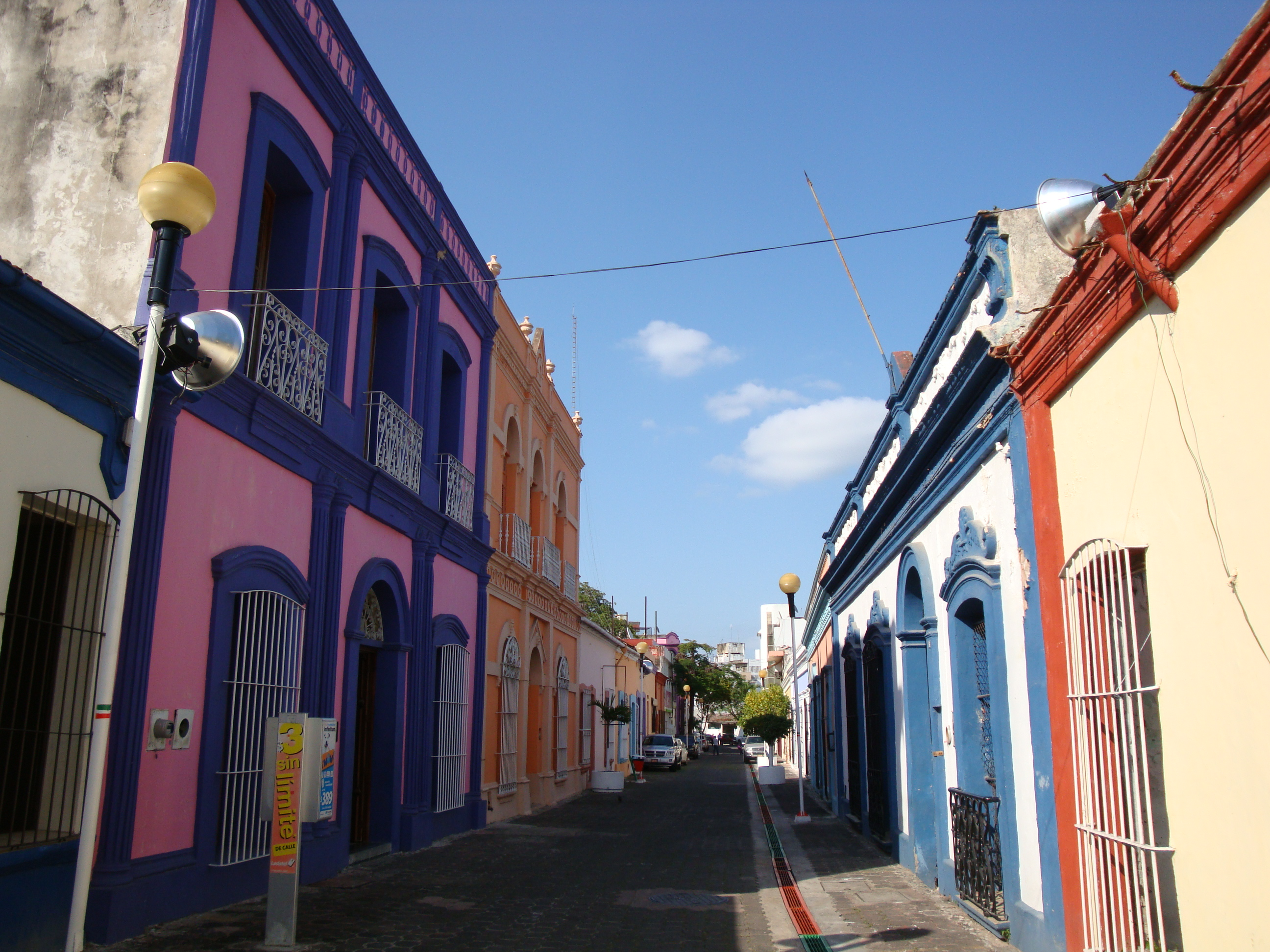
Narciso Sáenz street, in the Historic centre of Villahermosa

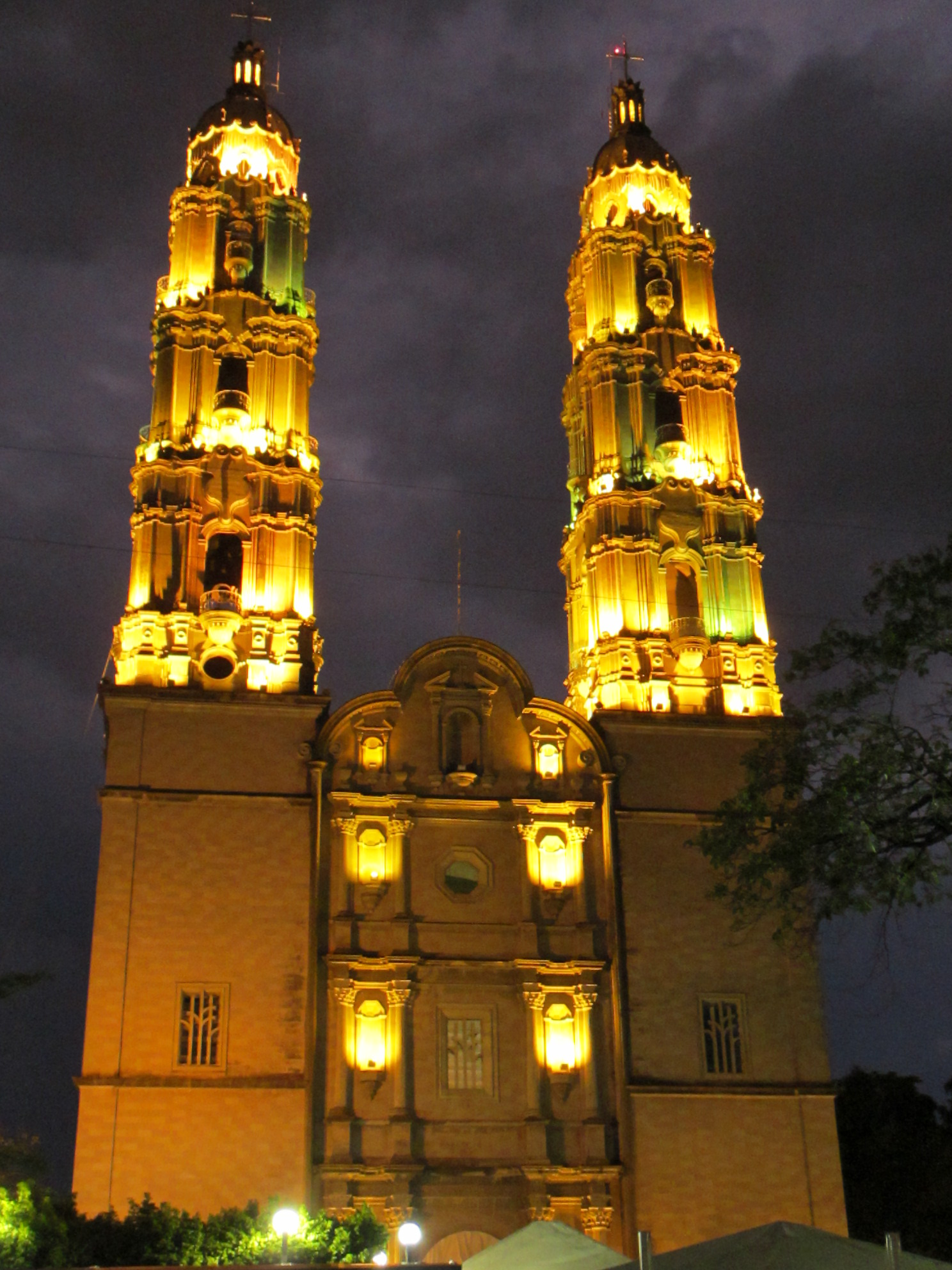
Cathedral of Villahermosa

The city has an extensive network of elementary, secondary, and college-preparatory educational centers.

It is also home to the most important universities of the state of Tabasco, among them:

- Universidad Juárez Autónoma de Tabasco (UJAT)
- Instituto Tecnológico de Villahermosa
- Universidad Tecnológica de Tabasco
- Universidad del Valle de México
- Universidad Mundo Maya
- Universidad Olmeca
- Universidad Autónoma de Guadalajara Campus Tabasco

== Religion ==
Although Mexico does not recognize an official religion, most of the population in Villahermosa is Roman Catholic (64.8%) with the Protestant religion coming in second (25.4%).

== Infrastructure ==
=== VT Villahermosa's Old Town ===
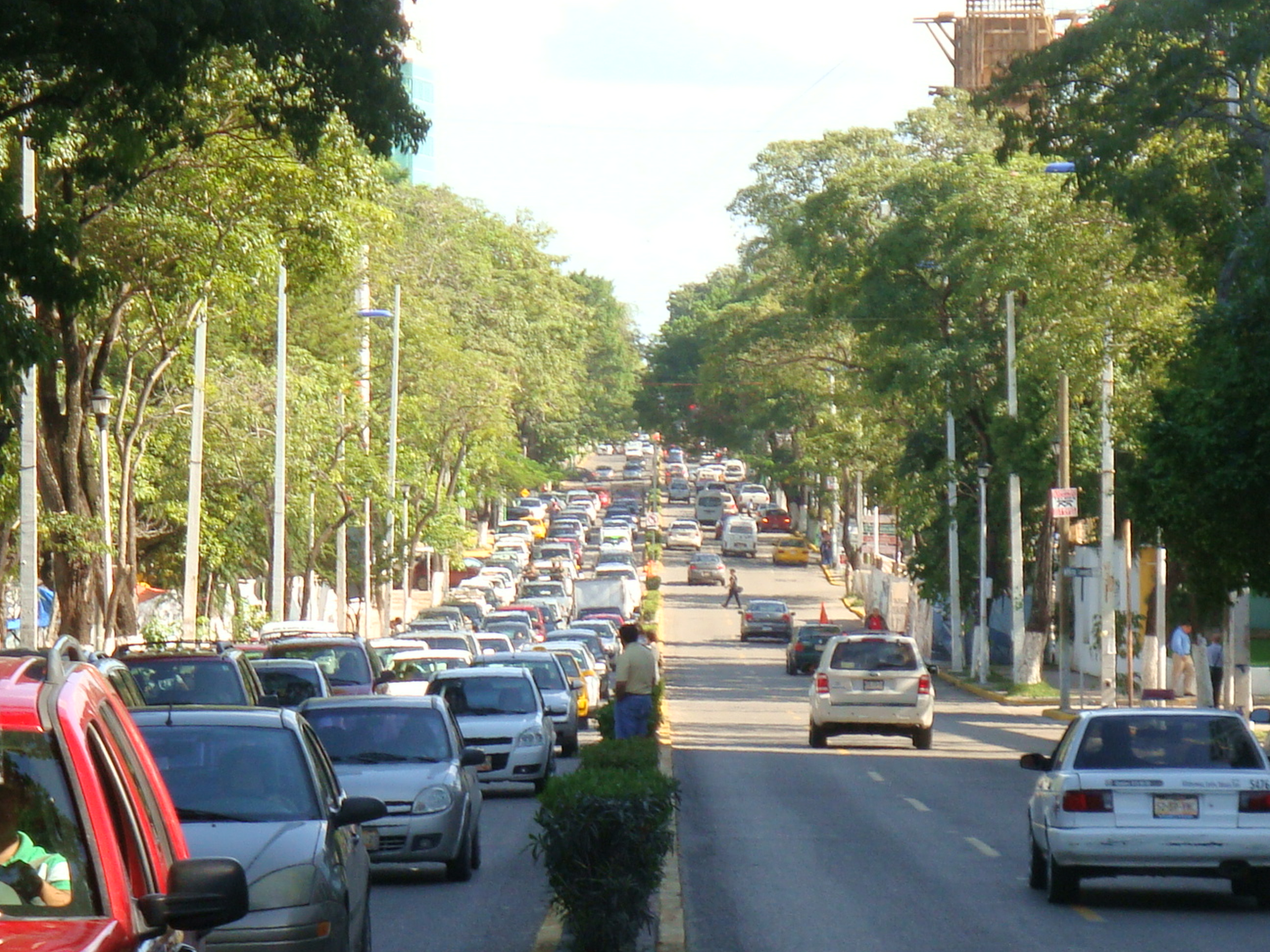
Avenida "Paseo Tabasco", the most emblematic of the city

Despite being a very old city, Villahermosa has a modern physiognomy. The historic center of Villahermosa'old town guards the old colonial center of the city. It is an area of approximately 143 hectares containing the oldest buildings in the city, including the first painting where the Plaza de Armas de Villahermosa' is located Plaza de Armas or Main Park, where the Tabasco Government Palace is located; Government Palace, the headquarters of the executive branch of the State; the Legislative Palace, the headquarters of the H. Congress of the State; the High Court of Justice, the headquarters of the Judiciary, and the Church of the Conception, opened on 8 December 1800 but destroyed by the American bombing sprees in 1846 and 1847 and by the French in 1863 and 1864. There are other buildings of historical value in the area, such as the House of Tiles (now the Museum of History), the ancient Juarez Institute (now house of culture of the UJAT), the museum house of the poet Carlos Pellicer Camera and others buildings that are now art galleries or businesses.

The heart of the Historic Center of Villahermosa's historic center is the so-called Light Zone', formed by Juarez, Lerdo, Aldama, and Sáenz streets, Reforma, which are the oldest in the city and which have been transformed into pedestrian streets, where there are cafes, restaurants, neverías, clothing stores, etc., and they constitute the commercial heart of the city. Also within the Historic Center of Villahermosa's old town are located the Park of the Corregidora, the Juarez Park, the Square of the Eagle and the Square Bicentennial, with a metallic obelísco of 30 meters high.

Outside the historic center, the city features modern architecture. Its rapid development since the 1970s caused it to overflow into areas that were formerly formed by lagoons, grasslands and swamps, and to absorb other communities, such as Atasta, Tamulté and Red Land, now populous boroughs (colonias). Its most important roads that link the city of Villahermosa between different points are: Av.Tabasco Walk: from the Gaviotas Bridge to the Peripheral Arco Noreste, crossing sites such as the Main Cemetery, the Cathedral of the Lord of Tabasco, crosses the Laguna de las Ilusions, the tourist complex Tabasco 2000, Gregorio Mendez Magaña Av., Av. 27 De Febrero, Av. Paseo Usumacinta, Av. Francisco J. Mina, El Boulevard Adolfo Ruiz Cortines and the Inner circuit Carlos Pellicer communicate to the different points of importance of the city.

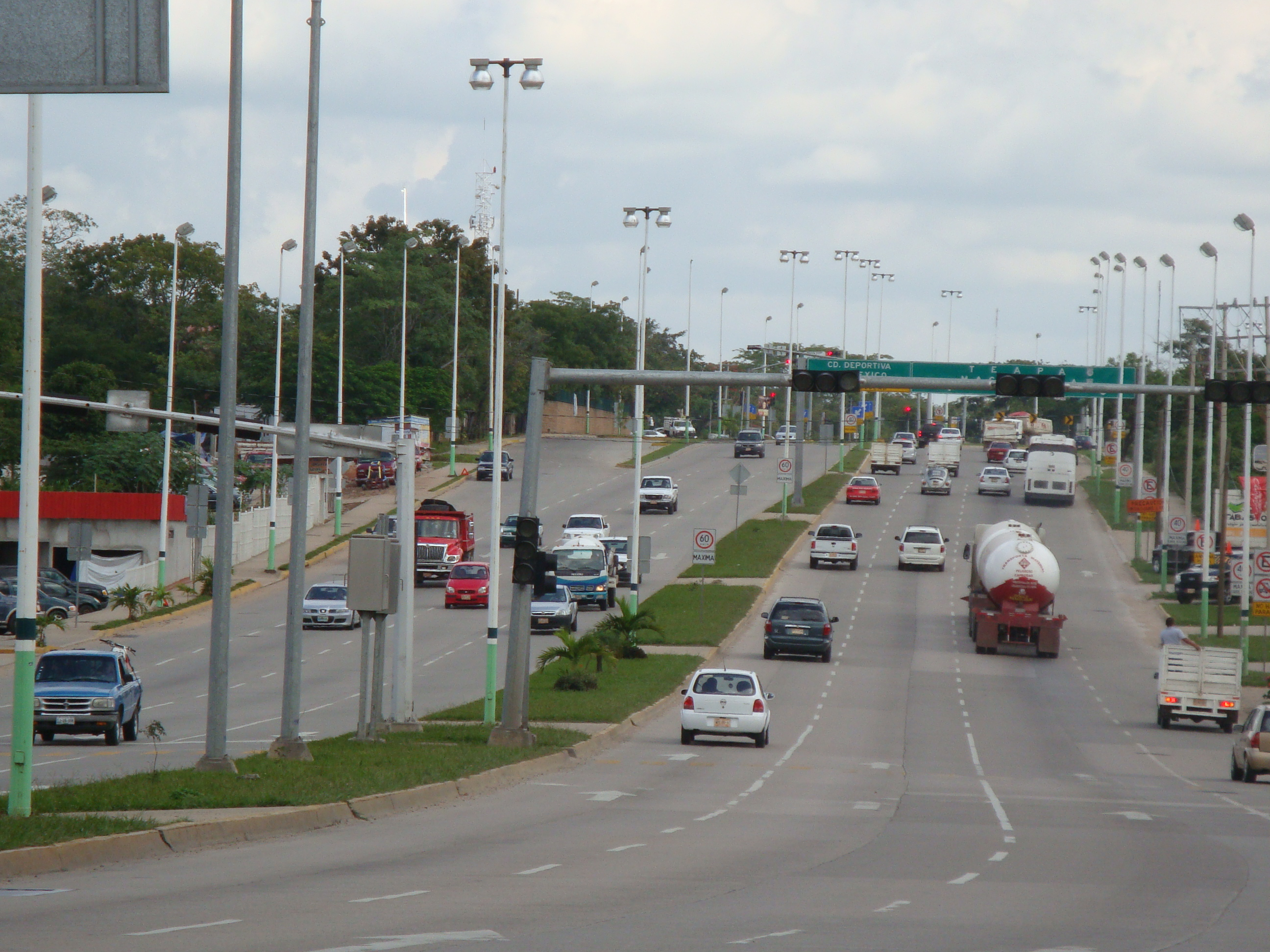
Indoor Circuíto "Carlos Pellicer Camera", expanded to 8 lanes, surrounds the urban area of the city.

In the west of the city is located the most important commercial and financial area called Tabasco 2000, urban complex built in the 1980s as a result of the strong oil activity, there are located important commercial squares, banks, restaurants, hotels and high-class residential developments. Tall and modern office buildings, they account for the important economic development of the city.

To the north is the Industrial City with its two stages, and housing areas of social interest and middle class. To the south, the mountains and higher areas have led to the proliferation of shopping centers and housing and residential developments.

Over the past 10 years, the lack of suitable land for the construction of housing and the new reordering that prohibits construction in low and flood areas of the city, has led to the growth of housing developments to the outskirts of the city, promoting the growth of the urban spot towards nearby towns, now integrated into the so-called Metropolitan Area of Villahermosa, promoting the development of populations such as Villa Parrilla, Macultepec, Ocuiltzapotlán, Playas del Rosario, Río Viejo, Buenavista, Ixtacomitán and Boquerón where most housing fractions currently take place.

=== Major urban planning projects ===
Drone video of Laguna de las Ilusiones and Tomás Garrido Canabal Park, Villahermosa, Tabasco, Mexico.

The most important urban projects that are planned or currently under construction in the city of Villahermosa, are:

- Emerald City, (Project) Includes State Government offices, as well as medium-interest housing, hospitals and shopping plazas
- New Convention Center' (Project) A huge complex of halls for top-level exhibitions.
- Extension of the Internal Circuit Carlos Pellicer, is an extension of 4 to 8 lanes of what was once the Peripheral of the city since due to its growth this was absorbed by the urban spot, now called "Circuit Interiór"
- Libramiento de Villahermosa, 4-lane road, 12 steps at uneven and 39 km long, which will serve to de-skid the heavy traffic that daily runs through the streets of the city. This route will be quota, and is expected to be completed in 2013.
- Road Distributor 'Tabscoob'' (Already built)Modern road distributor located at the confluence of Adolfo Ruíz Cortines, Luis Donaldo Colosio and Circuit Interior "Carlos Pellicer" in the east of the city, and will speed up the intense traffic existing vehicle in the Tabscoob roundabout.
- Road Distributor 'La Pigua'' (construction completed): This road distributor projected for the confluence of University Avenue and the "Carlos Pellicer" Indoor Circuit, which will serve to speed up the intense vehicular traffic that exists in the currently in the roundabout "Carlos A. Madrazo" in the north of the city. It envisages the expansion of two bridges over the Carrizal River as well as the extension of 4 to 8 lanes of industrial boulevard. Mexican and two steps at unevenness.
- Villa Brisa (Land Preparation) This is a mixed-use development located on the side of the Shopping Center Plaza Altabrisa' Altabrisa, will have an artificial lake and several towers of apartments and shops.
- Tabasco Diamante' (In Construction): Located in front of the Shopping Center Plaza Altabrisa' Altabrisa On the peripheral Carlos Pellicer Camara

This project started in 2015.... The exact date of completion of the works is not yet known... This place will have numerous buildings and possibly shops of the chains Best Buy and Costco. It will occupy a 43-hectare plot of land.

=== Tourism ===
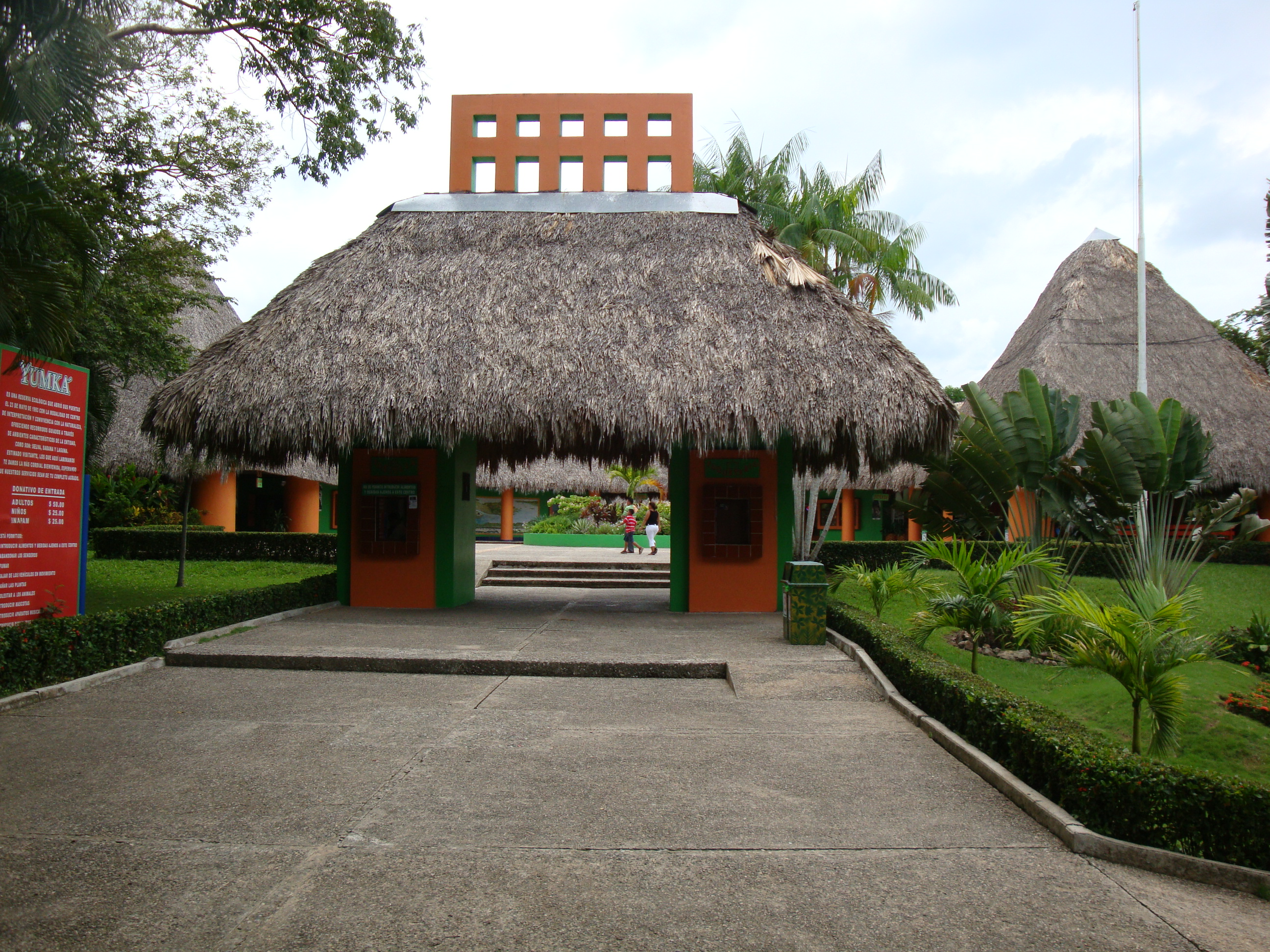
The Zoological Park "Yumká" is one of the main tourist attractions of the city.

In addition to this, Villahermosa is one of the main congress and convention destinations in the country. In 2010 alone, 61 congresses and conventions were held with a total of 40,933 attendees, highlighting that the city is the permanent seat of the "Mexico's International Petroleum Congress and Conference"' which is held each year and brings together just over 3,000 attendees from all over the world.

The city has more than 4,000 hotel rooms, large shopping, entertainment, dining and infrastructure.

It has an international airport, which has flights to and from the main cities of the country; by land, roads link it to the center and south of the country; and by sea, the commercial port of Two Mouths (80 km from the city), has the capacity to receive cargo ships and cruise ships up to 10 m in line, in addition to having port infrastructure.

== Health ==
Residents and visitors are served by private and public healthcare institutions, hospitals, clinics, ambulatory (same-day) centers, and extended stay centers. Amongst its specialized health care institutions, High Specialty Regional Hospital Women, Children's Hospital Dr. Rodolfo Nieto Padrón, and Hospital Regional de Alta Especialidad Dr. Juan Graham Casasús. The Seventh-day Adventist Church, Hospital del Sureste, established in 1975, is a highly advanced hospital, equipped with the latest infrastructure and technology.

== Sister Cities ==
Villahermosa has two sister cities. They are:

- San Bernardino, United States
- Coatzacoalcos, Mexico

== See also ==
- Aguilas de Tabasco
- Musevi
