= Monument to Andrés Sánchez Magallanes =

Monument in Villahermosa, Tabasco

- Monumento a Andrés Sánchez Magallanes (Spanish), La Chichona
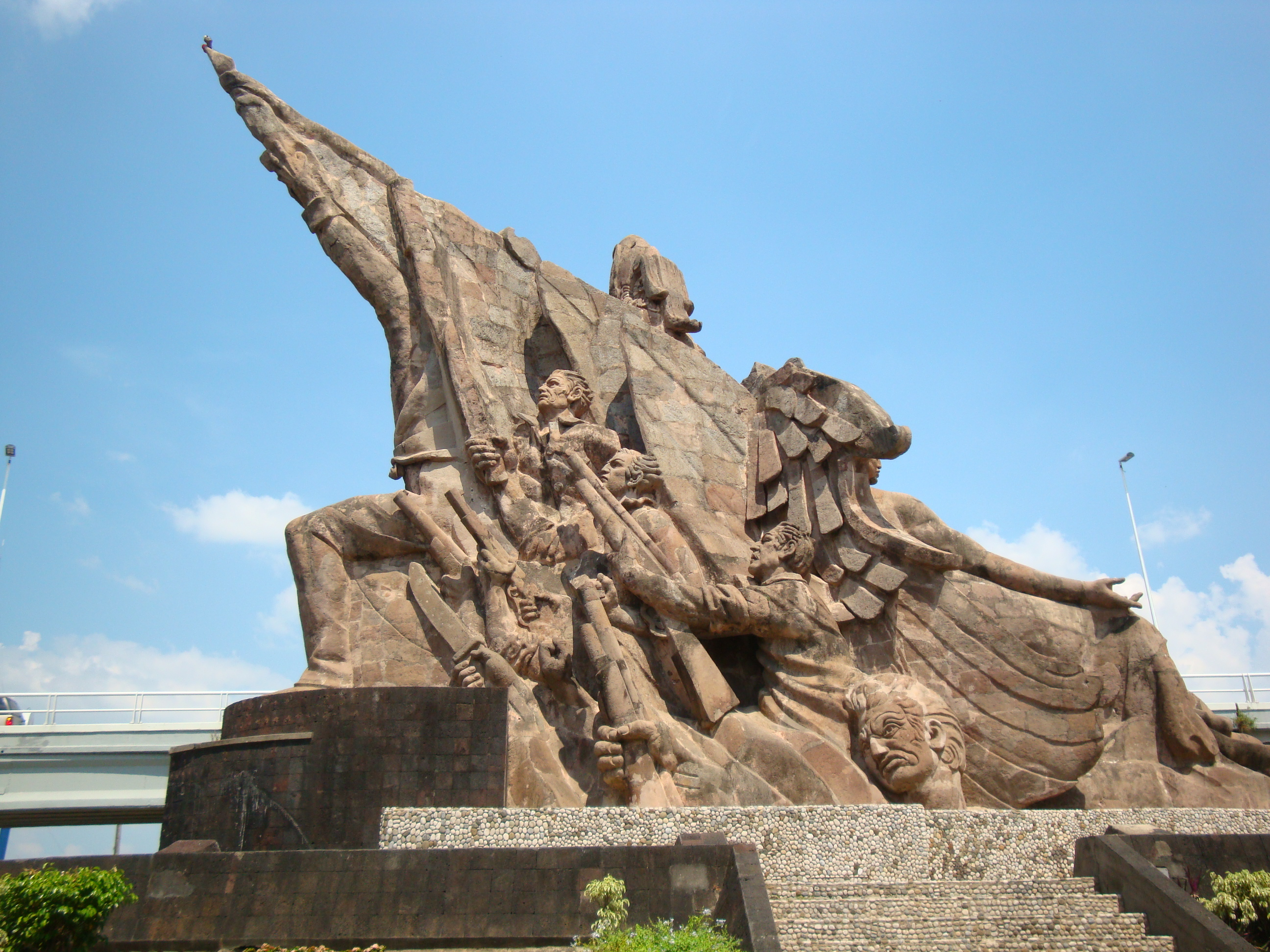
- The sculpture in 2010
- Location
- Artist: José Luis Silva
- Year: 1969
- Medium: Quarry
- Location: Villahermosa; 17°59′31.8″N 92°56′42.7″W

The monument to Andrés Sánchez Magallanes, colloquially known as La Chichona (lit. transl. The Busty Woman), is a memorial in Villahermosa, Tabasco, Mexico. It honors Colonel Andrés Sánchez Magallanes, who played a key role in expelling French forces from Villahermosa during the Second French intervention in Mexico.

Commissioned by Manuel Rafael Mora Martínez, governor of Tabasco between 1965 and 1970, the monument was constructed between 1967 and 1969 and designed by José Luis Silva, who used quarry stone for the structure. The project cost approximately one million pesos at the time. In 1997, the construction of a road distributor partially obstructed the monument's view from street level.

The nickname La Chichona derives from a prominent sculpture within the memorial: a seated female figure with a bare chest and large breasts, which has become a defining and widely recognized feature of the site. Other sculptures include an eagle devouring a serpent, reminiscent of the coat of arms of Mexico and figures of men rising in arms, representing the local resistance.
