= Musevi =

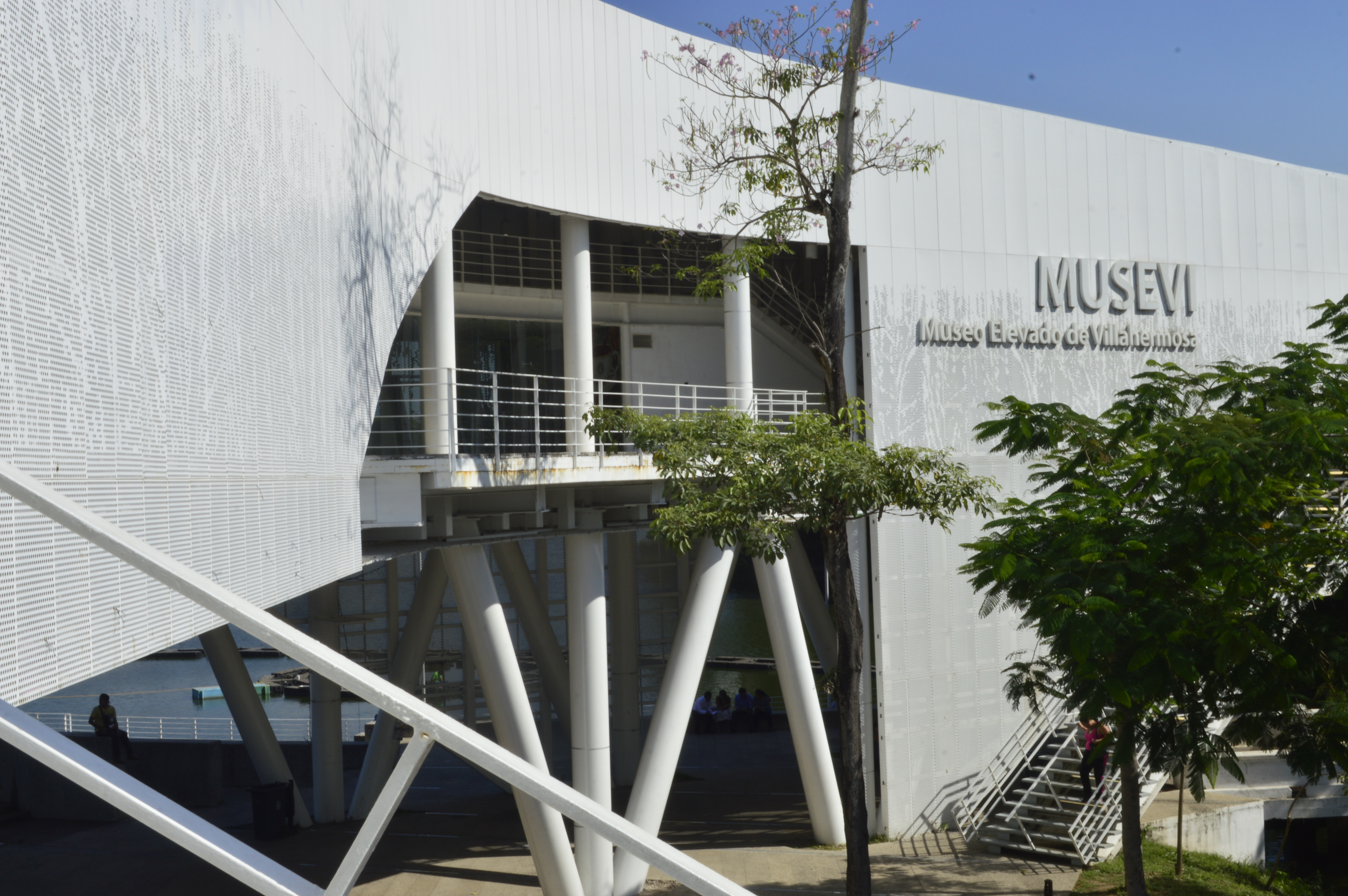
Museo Elevado de Villahermosa (MUSEVI).

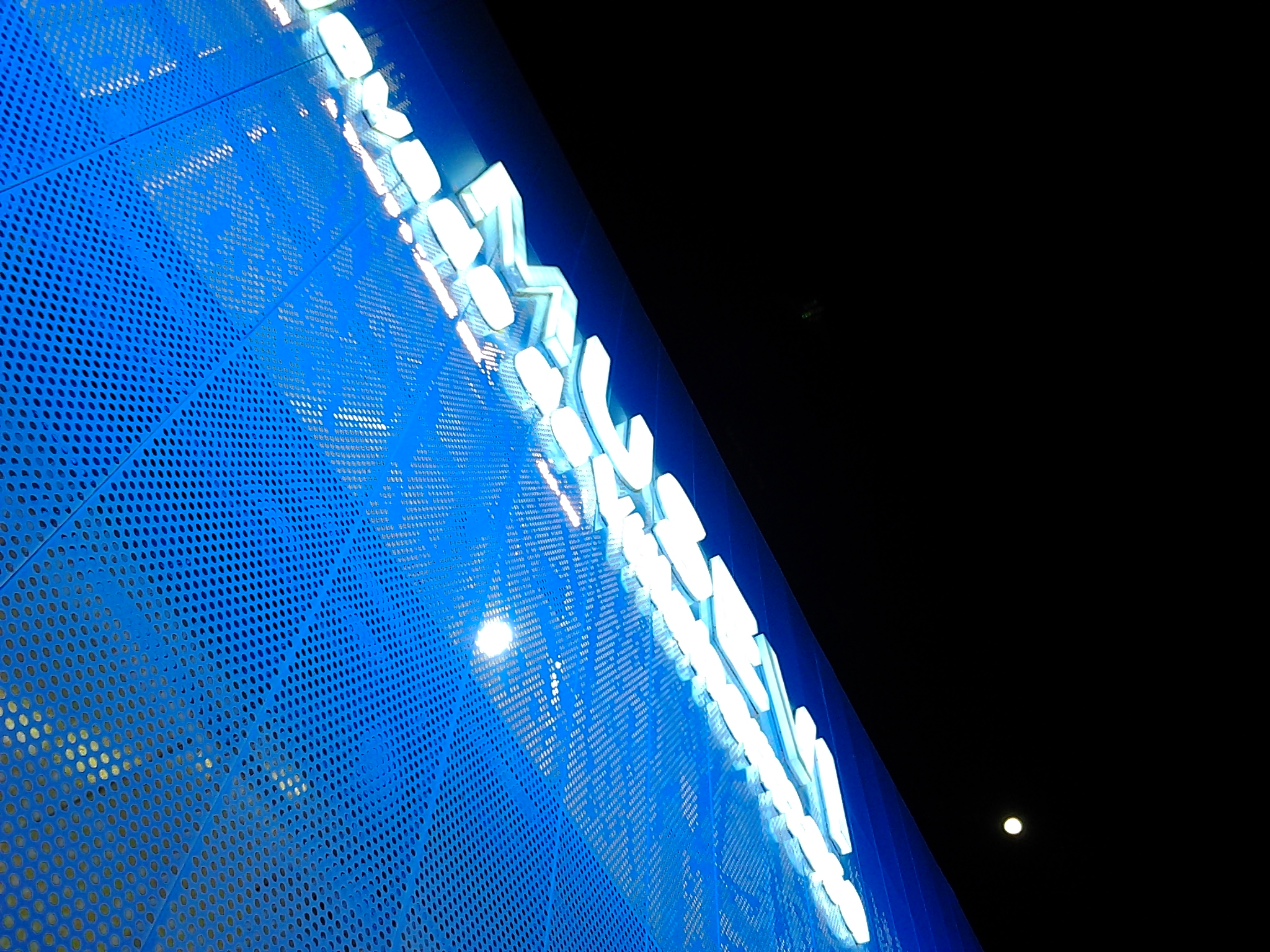
Facade

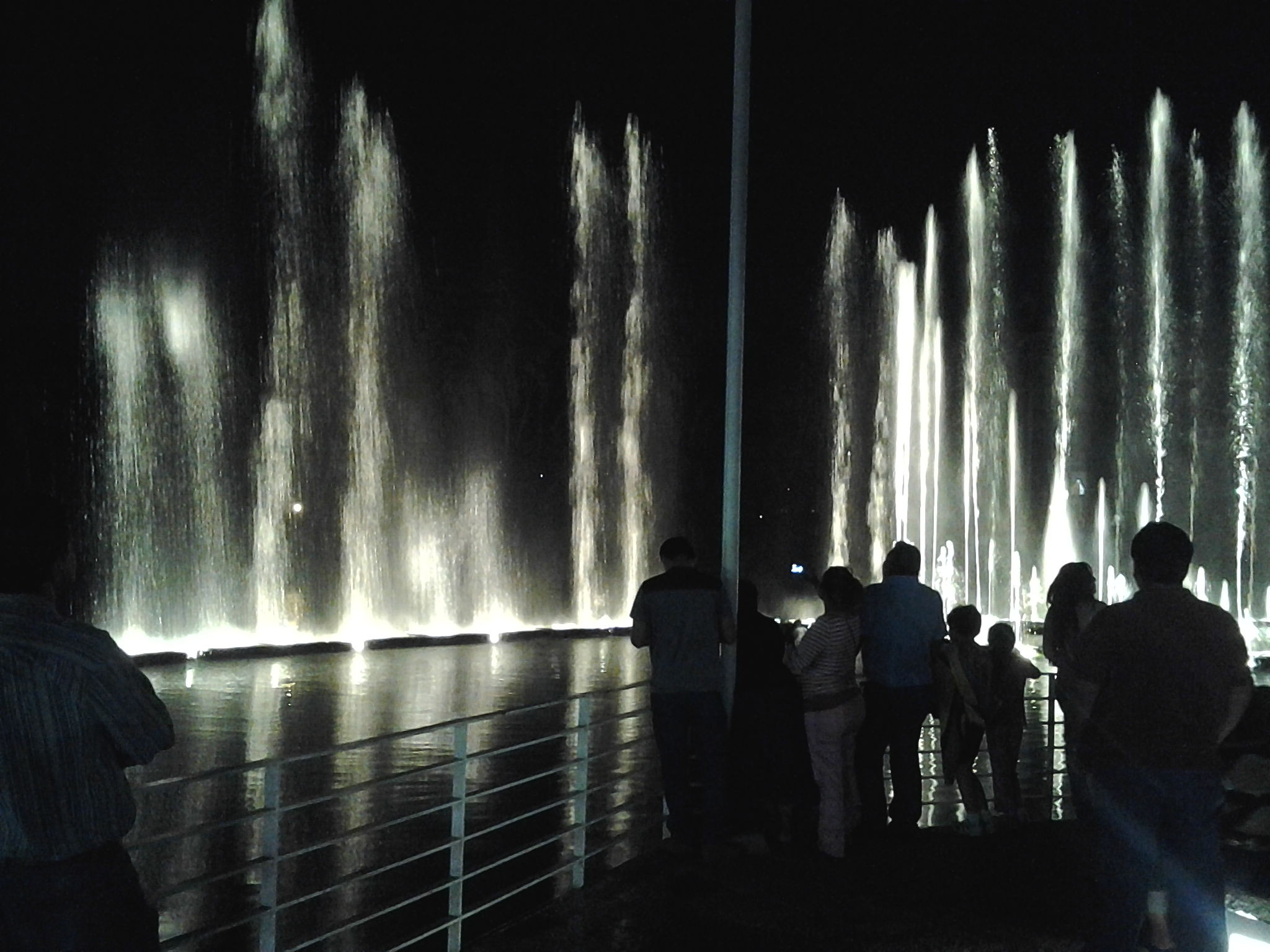
Light show

Musevi is a bridge to celebrate the bicentenary of the independence of Mexico; it is located in the city of Villahermosa, Tabasco, on the side of the lake of "Las Illusiones" and Tomas Garrido Park. It has a museum of regional artists and a coffee shop on the top of the bridge. It crosses the Paseo Tabsco avenue.

== Attractions ==
- 1- Musevi
- 2- Amphitheater
- 3- Sound and light show
- 4- Playground
- 5- Earth Museum
- 6- Gourmet zone
