= Aguilas de Tabasco =

Mexican football club

Aguilas De Tabasco
- Full name: Club de Futbol Aguilas De Tabasc
- Nickname: Piratas
- Ground: deportiva de teapa, Villahermosa, Tabasco, México
- Chairman: Javier Gutierrez Rodriguez
- Manager: Rafael García Zubieta
- League: Tercera División de México
Home colours	Away colours

Aguilas De Tabasco is a Mexican football club that plays in the Tercera División de México. The club is based in Villahermosa, Tabasco, México.

The club is an affiliate of Liga MX side Club América for the state of Tabasco. It won only one of its first 25 matches in the 2009–10 Tercera División, Group I season, and suffered a heavy 6–0 defeat to Petroleros. The club was suspended by the FMF following financial problems in the 2010–11 season, but was re-admitted to the Tercera División, Group I for the 2011–12 season.

== See also ==
- Football in Mexico
