= Mary Butt =

Mary Butt may refer to:

- Mary Martha Sherwood (1775–1851), née Butt, English writer of children's literature
- Mary Elizabeth Butt (1903–1993), Texas philanthropist
