= William Crook (politician) =

American preacher and politician

11th United States Ambassador to Australia
- In office 1968–1969
- President: Lyndon B. Johnson
- Preceded by: Ed Clark
- Succeeded by: Walter L. Rice

Personal details
- Born: April 18, 1925 Momence, Illinois, U.S.
- Died: October 29, 1997 (aged 72)
- Party: Democratic
- Spouse: Eleanor Butt (m. 1954)
- Relations: Howard Edward Butt Sr. (father-in-law)
- Children: 3

William Herbert Crook (April 18, 1925 – October 29, 1997) was an American preacher turned politician, national director of the Volunteers in Service to America (VISTA) program and U.S. Ambassador to Australia.

William Herbert Crook was born in Momence, Illinois on April 18, 1925. In 1954, Crook married Eleanor Butt, daughter of Howard Edward Butt Sr., the founder of the H-E-B grocery store chain. They had three children, William Crook Jr., Elizabeth Crook, and Noel Moore. He died on October 29, 1997, at the age of 72.
