= Charles Butt =

American heir and billionaire

- Born: Charles Clarence Butt; February 3, 1938 (age 87)
- Education: University of Pennsylvania; Harvard University
- Title: Chairman and CEO, H-E-B
- Term: 1971–
- Parent(s): Howard Edward Butt Sr. Mary Elizabeth Holdsworth

Charles Clarence Butt (born February 3, 1938) is an American heir and billionaire. He inherited his family's San Antonio–based H-E-B supermarket chain in 1971. The privately held company has more than 400 stores and $38.9 billion in sales, according to Forbes.

In late 2019, Butt and his family had a net worth of over US$10 billion, according to Forbes. Butt was listed #230 on Forbes billionaire list in 2025.

== Early life ==
Charles Clarence Butt was born on February 3, 1938, the son of Howard Edward Butt Sr. and Mary Elizabeth Holdsworth, and the grandson of Florence Butt, who founded H-E-B in 1905.

Butt graduated from University of Pennsylvania's Wharton School with a bachelor's degree. He earned an MBA from Harvard Business School.

== Career ==
Butt became chairman, CEO, and president of the H-E-B Grocery Company in 1971.

In late 2019, Butt and his family had a net worth of over US$10 billion, according to Forbes.

== Awards and recognition ==
In November 2001, the Mexican government awarded Butt the Aguila Azteca medal for his philanthropic involvement and business dealings in Mexico.

In 2013, AdvisoryCloud ranked Butt as the No. 5 CEO on its Top Chief Executive List.

== Philanthropy ==
Butt pledged $50 million to the Raising Texas Teachers scholarship fund to support the training of Texas public school teachers.

In January 2017, he pledged $100 million to Texas public education and created The Holdsworth Center, named after his mother Mary Elizabeth Butt (née Holdsworth).

In September 2017, Butt donated $5 million to J. J. Watt's Houston Hurricane Harvey relief fund.

In May 2018, Butt pledges to The Giving Pledge and writes in his release that he intends to help children and teachers.

In June 2022, the Butt family and H-E-B donated $10 million to help build a new elementary school in Uvalde, Texas after the mass shooting at Robb Elementary School.

In March 2024, Butt donated $500,000 to the State of Texas Agricultural Relief (STAR) Fund to aid Texas farmers, ranchers, and other agricultural businesses affected by the wildfires there.

== Personal life ==
In 2024, Butt donated about 75 pieces from his personal art collection to museums in Texas.

Butt frequently donates to political campaigns, primarily those of Republicans but has donated to various Democratic campaigns as well.
