= Mary Elizabeth Butt =

American philanthropist (1903–1993)

Mary Elizabeth Holdsworth Butt
- Born: Mary Elizabeth Holdsworth; February 4, 1903; Loma Vista, Texas, US
- Died: October 6, 1993 (aged 90); Corpus Christi, Texas, US
- Occupation: philanthropist
- Known for: co-founder of the Conference of Texas Foundations and Trusts
- Spouse: Howard Edward Butt Sr.
- Children: 4, including Charles Clarence Butt

Mary Elizabeth Butt, née Holdsworth (1903–1993) was a prominent Texas philanthropist and wife of former HEB Grocery Company CEO Howard Edward Butt Sr., son of HEB founder, Florence Butt. Her philanthropic efforts were particularly focused on the care of emotionally disturbed children and the development of library services.

== Early life ==
Mary Elizabeth Holdsworth Butt was born on February 4, 1903, near Loma Vista, Texas, the daughter of Rosa (née Ross) and Thomas Holdsworth. She was the fourth of seven children. Her father, the son of an English schoolteacher, emigrated from England to Texas with his parents in 1880. Her mother was a schoolteacher who grew up and worked in Kerrville, Texas. Both her parents were devout, tithing Baptists. In 1924, she married Howard Edward Butt. Howard owned a small grocery store in Kerrville. Over time, her husband's business prospered and expanded, enabling Mary Elizabeth to take an active role in supporting numerous and varied charitable causes. Her husband stated: "I make the money, and Mary spends it (on worthy causes). And I am glad she does." In 1940, they moved to Corpus Christi, Texas.

== Philanthropy ==
In 1929, she moved to Brownsville, Texas, in the Rio Grande Valley and thereafter to Harlingen. Mary Elizabeth started the State Crippled Children's Program using her dining room as an office. She also served as chairwoman of the Cameron County Child Welfare Board. In addition, she started the first tuberculosis diagnosis and treatment program in the region; and also purchased the first equipment used to test the hearing and vision of schoolchildren.

In 1934, the Butts formed the H. E. Butt Foundation, one of the first charitable organizations in Texas. The foundation focused on funding public school programs, establishing libraries and constructing recreational facilities. Mary Butt served as its president.

In 1940, the Butt family moved to Corpus Christi, Texas, where she organized the local branches of the YWCA; the Nueces County home for the aged; the Nueces County Tuberculosis Hospital; and the local branch of the American Cancer Society. She also established the Mary Bethune Day Nursery which addressed shortfalls in access to day care for African-American children.

In 1949, she along with Dr. Robert Sutherland (director of the Hogg Foundation for Mental Health founded by Ima Hogg in 1940) and Margaret Scarbrough (wife of Austin retailer Lemuel Scarbrough and founder of the Scarbrough Foundation), organized and hosted the first Conference of Texas Foundations and Trusts which coordinated philanthropic giving so as to avoid duplication and promoted the exchange ideas and strategies. Texas became the first state to have such an organization and the model was duplicated in other states. The Foundation quickly blossomed from 10 mostly family-sponsored organizations at inception to 48 organizations in 1956. The organization (now known as the Conference of Southwest Foundations) presently consists of 200 member organizations in a seven-state area.

In 1953, she helped to establish the Hilltop Hospital which treated tuberculosis patients and eventually serving five years as the chairman of its board. In 1954, the Butts established the H. E. Butt Foundation Camp located on the Frio River As she was particularly dedicated to the care of emotionally disturbed children, she developed a camping program for specifically for their care. As of 2012, the camp continues to serve, without cost, over 20,000 campers annually and is also the site of the Laity Lodge, a prominent center of Christian learning founded by their son, Howard E. Butt Jr.

In 1955, she was appointed by Texas Governor Allan Shivers to the governing board of Texas State Hospitals and Special Schools (later the Texas Department of Mental Health and Mental Retardation). She served as the only woman member of the board for 18 years being appointed by six different governors.

The Butts contributed to the founding of the Butt-Holdsworth Memorial Library, which was inaugurated in summer 1967.

== Personal life and death ==
She had four children with her husband:

- Howard E. Butt Jr., the president of H. E. Butt Foundation and founder of the Christian learning center, Laity Lodge;
- Margaret Eleanor Butt Crook, served as director of Bread for the World. Her husband, William H. Crook, served as director of the Volunteers in Service to America (VISTA) and later as United States Ambassador to Australia;
- Charles Clarence Butt, the chairman of H. E. Butt Grocery Company and founder of education leadership organization The Holdsworth Center. Charles named The Holdsworth Center after Mary Elizabeth.

Another child, Mary Beth Butt, who lived for only 10 days (November 17, 1943 - November 27, 1943), is buried beside Mary Elizabeth Holdsworth Butt at the Glen Rest Cemetery in Kerrville, Texas, was the fourth child of Howard Butt, Sr., and Mary Elizabeth Holdsworth Butt.

Mary Elizabeth Holdsworth Butt died in her house in Corpus Christi on October 6, 1993.

== Awards ==
The Texas State Historical Association lists the many awards Butt has received over the years for her philanthropic activities:

- In 1954, she was the first woman to be awarded the Mrs. South Texas Award in recognition of her work in the fields of "public health, social service, and education."
- In 1968, Howard and Mary Butt were awarded the Texas Library Association Philanthropic Award of the Year in recognition of their service to public libraries.
- In 1975, they were awarded the Brotherhood Award from the Corpus Christi Chapter of the National Conference of Christians and Jews in recognition of their charitable activities.
- In 1981, Mary received the first Yellow Rose Award by the Parent's Association for the Retarded in Texas.
- In 1986, the Texas Alliance for the Mentally Ill made Mary Elizabeth the first recipient of its lifetime award, in honor of her "leadership in improving human services for the people of Texas."
- In 1993, the National Council of Juvenile and Family Court Judges' Awards Committee selected her to receive the council's highest award for "Meritorious Service to the Children of America."
- On March 23, 1995, the Senate of the State of Texas passed a resolution to "honor the life and memory of Mary Elizabeth Holdsworth Butt and express appreciation for her many gifts to the citizens of our state".
