= Favor Delivery =

American food delivery company

NeighborFavor, Inc.
- Trade name: Favor Delivery
- Type: Subsidiary
- Founded: 2013; 13 years ago
- Founders: Zachary Maurais; Ben Doherty
- Headquarters: Austin, Texas, United States
- Area served: Texas
- Key people: Keith Duncan (CEO)
- Parent: H-E-B (2018–present)
- Website: favordelivery.com

Favor Delivery is an American same-day delivery and online food ordering company headquartered in Austin, Texas. Founded in 2013 by Zachary Maurais and Ben Doherty, the company operates throughout Texas and has been a subsidiary of supermarket chain H-E-B since 2018. After initially expanding outside Texas, Favor withdrew from its non-Texas markets and subsequently expanded to more than 400 cities across the state. Keith Duncan has been chief executive officer since 2023.

== History ==
NeighborFavor, Inc. was founded in Austin in 2013 by Zachary Maurais and Ben Doherty. The company raised a $13 million Series A funding round in March 2015.

Favor initially expanded outside Texas. Between 2013 and 2016, it grew to serve 23 cities in the United States and Canada. In 2016, however, the company began withdrawing from several major markets, including Philadelphia, Washington, D.C., Atlanta, Miami and Chicago. It ended service in Toronto in December 2016, and by January 2017 had withdrawn from all of its remaining markets outside Texas, where it continued operating in 15 cities.

In September 2017, Favor raised a $22 million Series B round led by existing investor S3 Ventures, bringing its total funding to $34 million. The company also said it had reached overall profitability that year after concentrating its operations in Texas.

H-E-B acquired Favor in February 2018 for an undisclosed amount. At the time, Favor had 140 employees and approximately 50,000 contract delivery drivers and had completed about eight million deliveries. Favor became a wholly owned subsidiary of H-E-B but continued to operate independently as a separate brand under chief executive Jag Bath.

Favor continued expanding within Texas following the acquisition. By November 2019, it operated in 130 cities across the state and had more than 80,000 contract delivery drivers.

In February 2023, Keith Duncan succeeded Bath as CEO. Duncan had previously worked at Favor from 2015 to 2021 before becoming chief revenue officer of real-estate technology company Orchard.

By 2025, Favor operated in more than 400 cities across Texas.

== Services ==
Favor provides deliveries from restaurants, grocery stores and other retailers through its mobile application. Deliveries are performed by contract delivery drivers, whom the company calls "Runners".

In August 2024, Favor and H-E-B introduced H-E-B Now, an express grocery delivery service offered through the Favor app. Customers can order up to 15 grocery and household items for delivery within 45 minutes or less.

Favor launched a subscription program called Favor Gold in March 2025. At launch, the program cost $9.99 per month and offered waived delivery fees on eligible orders, reduced service fees, a monthly H-E-B discount and discounts at participating local restaurants.

== See also ==
- DoorDash
- Grubhub
- Instacart
- Shipt
- Uber Eats
