= Howard Edward Butt Sr. =

American philanthropist

Howard E. Butt Sr.
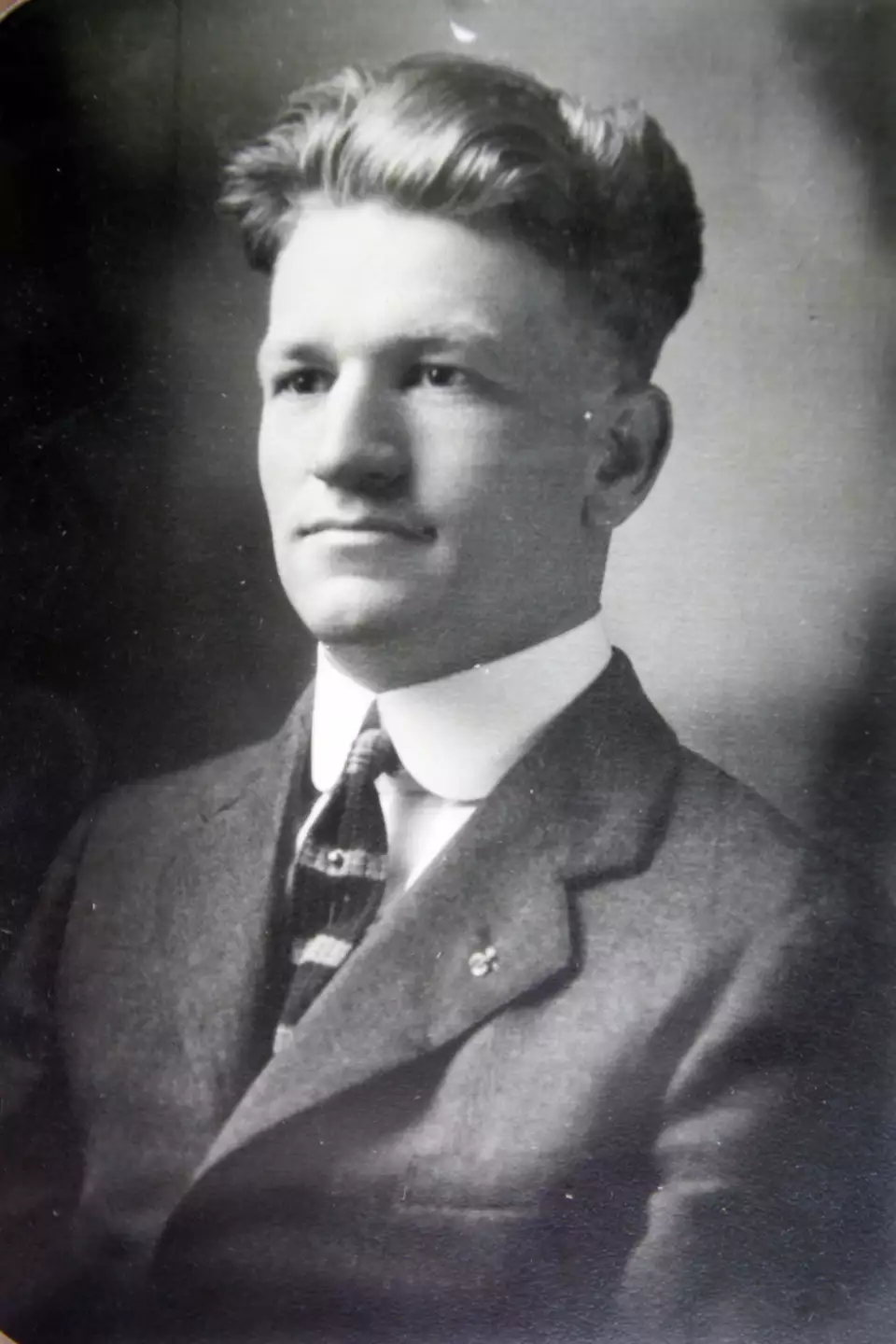
- Howard E. Butt Sr. in 1924
- Born: Howard Edward Butt; April 9, 1895; Memphis, Tennessee, U.S.
- Died: March 12, 1991 (aged 95); Corpus Christi, Texas, U.S.
- Occupation: Businessman
- Known for: CEO of the H-E-B grocery store chain
- Spouse: Mary Elizabeth Holdsworth
- Children: 4, including Charles Butt
- Relatives: William H. Crook (son-in-law)

Howard Edward Butt Sr. (April 9, 1895 – March 12, 1991) was an American businessman, and CEO of the H-E-B grocery store chain, which was founded by his mother, Florence Thornton Butt, in 1905.

== Early life ==
Howard Butt was youngest of the three sons born to Charles Butt, a pharmacist from Memphis, and Florence Thornton Butt. The family moved to the drier climate of Kerrville, Texas, due to his father's tuberculosis, and in 1905, his mother opened a small grocery store below their apartment. Howard managed the store while in high school and then after graduation, moved to California, where he harvested grapes. After service in the Navy during World War I, he returned to Texas in 1919 to once again manage the family store.

== Career ==
In 1922, he switched the store from the traditional "credit-and-delivery" setup to "cash-and-carry" and expanded its lineup from basic groceries to include personal care products. His first attempt at expansion – establishing a feed store in Kerrville and three satellite stores in nearby towns – ended in failure. In 1926, he tried again and opened a second store in Del Rio, Texas, 150 miles to the southwest along the Rio Grande which was successful. In 1928, he borrowed $38,000 realizing the need to expand to areas with greater population. He purchased a further three stores in the Rio Grande Valley some 300 miles to the South near the Mexican border. His new strategy paid off and he moved the company headquarters to Harlingen, Texas, where he opened up a distribution center and established the Harlingen Cannery which packaged Texas-manufactured produce. Thereafter, the company grew rapidly expanding into Laredo (1929), Corpus Christi (1931), Austin (1938), and San Antonio (1943).

In 1935, he changed the name of the company to H.E. Butt Grocery. In 1940, he moved the company headquarters to Corpus Christi where he had opened a central bakery four years earlier. In 1946, he shortened the company name to H-E-B. In 1952, H-E-B opened its first supermarket in Corpus Christi then a new retail store concept where a shopper could purchase meat, fish, produce, baked goods, and personal care products under a single roof. Butt gradually transitioned control of the company to his two sons. In 1971, his eldest son, Howard E. Butt Jr., resigned from the presidency to become a minister and his second son Charles Butt took over the leadership role. Howard Edward Butt Sr. remained as chairman until 1991 when he died at age 95.

== Personal life ==
In 1924, he married Mary Elizabeth Holdsworth. They had four children:

- Howard E. Butt Jr. (September 8, 1927 – September 11, 2016), president of the H. E. Butt Foundation and founder of Christian learning center Laity Lodge.
- Margaret Eleanor Butt Crook served as director of Bread for the World. Her husband, William H. Crook, served as director of the Volunteers in Service to America (VISTA) and later as United States Ambassador to Australia.
- Charles Clarence Butt (born February 3, 1938), the chairman of H.E. Butt Grocery Company, and founder of The Holdsworth Center.
- Another child, Mary Beth Butt, who lived for only 10 days (November 17, 1943 – November 27, 1943), is buried beside Mary Elizabeth Holdsworth Butt at the Glen Rest Cemetery in Kerrville, Texas.

Butt was a lay minister in the Southern Baptist Church.

== Philanthropy ==
In 1934, after a destructive Texas hurricane, he founded the Howard E. Butt Community Investment Program whereby H-E-B would contribute 5% of its pretax earnings to various nonprofit organizations throughout Texas. Also in 1934, he established the H.E. Butt Foundation, one of the first charitable organizations in Texas. The foundation focused on funding public school programs, establishing libraries and constructing recreational facilities.

Butt deferred much of his philanthropic activities to his wife, stating: "I make the money, and Mary spends it (on worthy causes). And I am glad she does." His wife started the State Crippled Children's Program, served as chairwoman of the Cameron County Child Welfare Board, started the first tuberculosis diagnosis and treatment program in the region, and purchased the first equipment used to test the hearing and vision of schoolchildren. In 1949, she co-organized and hosted the first Conference of Texas Foundations and Trusts which coordinated philanthropic giving so as to avoid duplication and promoted the exchange ideas and strategies. In 1955, she was appointed by Texas Governor Allan Shivers to the governing board of Texas State Hospitals and Special Schools (later the Texas Department of Mental Health and Mental Retardation). She served as the only woman member of the board for 18 years being appointed by six different governors.

In 1961, President John F. Kennedy appointed Butt to the President's Committee on Equal Employment Opportunity. Butt also helped establish the University of Corpus Christi, now part of the Texas A&M University System.
