= Central Market (Texas) =

Upscale grocery chain owned by H-E-B

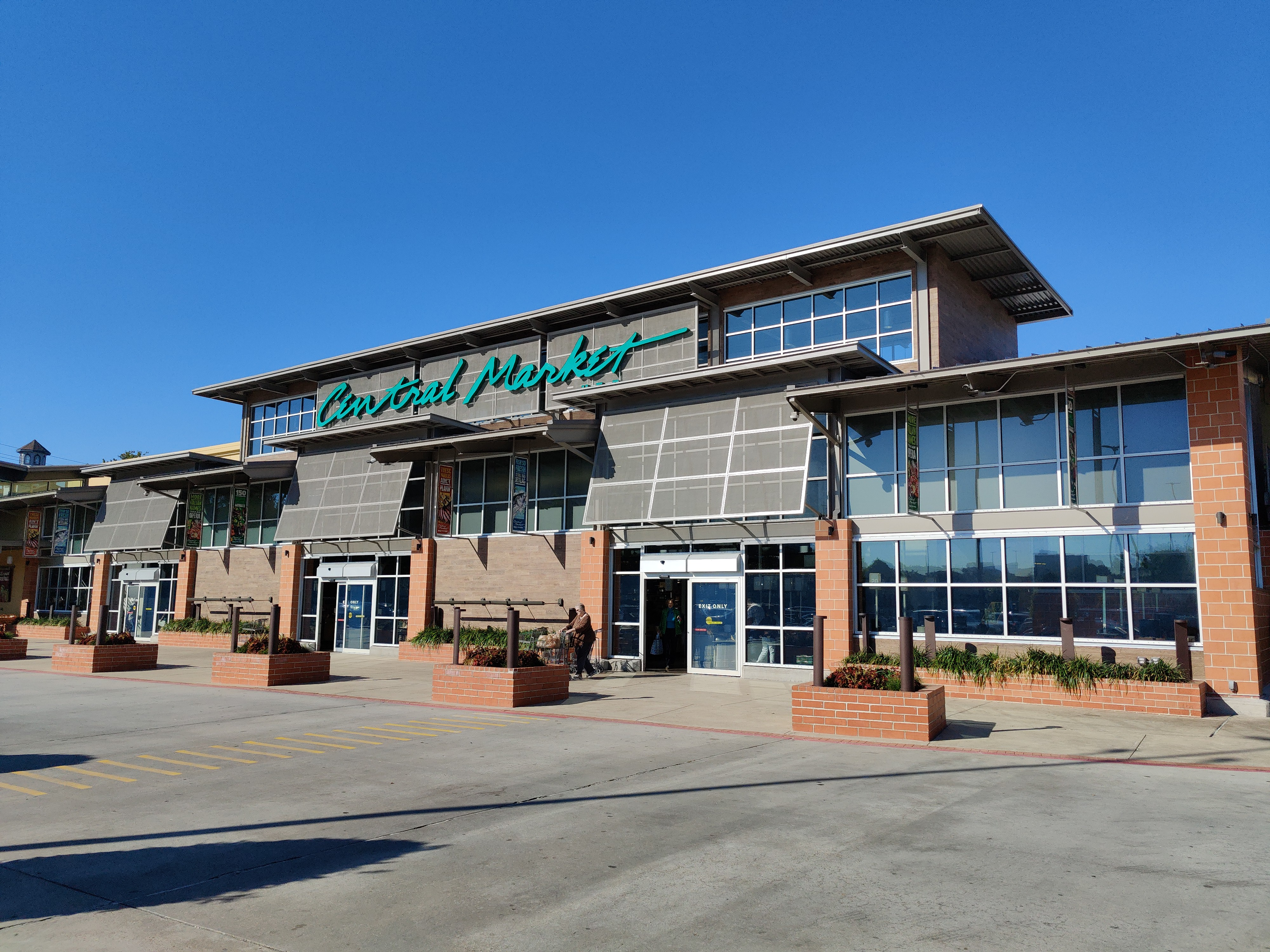
- Central Market in Houston in 2025
- Type: Division
- Industry: Grocery retail
- Founded: 1994; 32 years ago in Austin, Texas, U.S.
- Headquarters: Dallas, Texas, United States
- Number of locations: 10
- Area served: Texas
- Owner: H-E-B
- Website: www.centralmarket.com

Central Market is an American upscale grocery store chain owned by H-E-B. Founded in Austin, Texas, in 1994 and headquartered in Dallas, it operates ten stores in Texas. Its stores devote substantial space to fresh and prepared foods and specialty groceries, with less emphasis on conventional packaged and non-food supermarket merchandise.

== History ==
The first Central Market opened on North Lamar Boulevard in Austin in January 1994. H-E-B developed the store as a fresh- and specialty-food format distinct from its conventional supermarkets. Contemporary trade coverage described organized around fresh departments and specialty products rather than the general-merchandise mix of a typical supermarket.

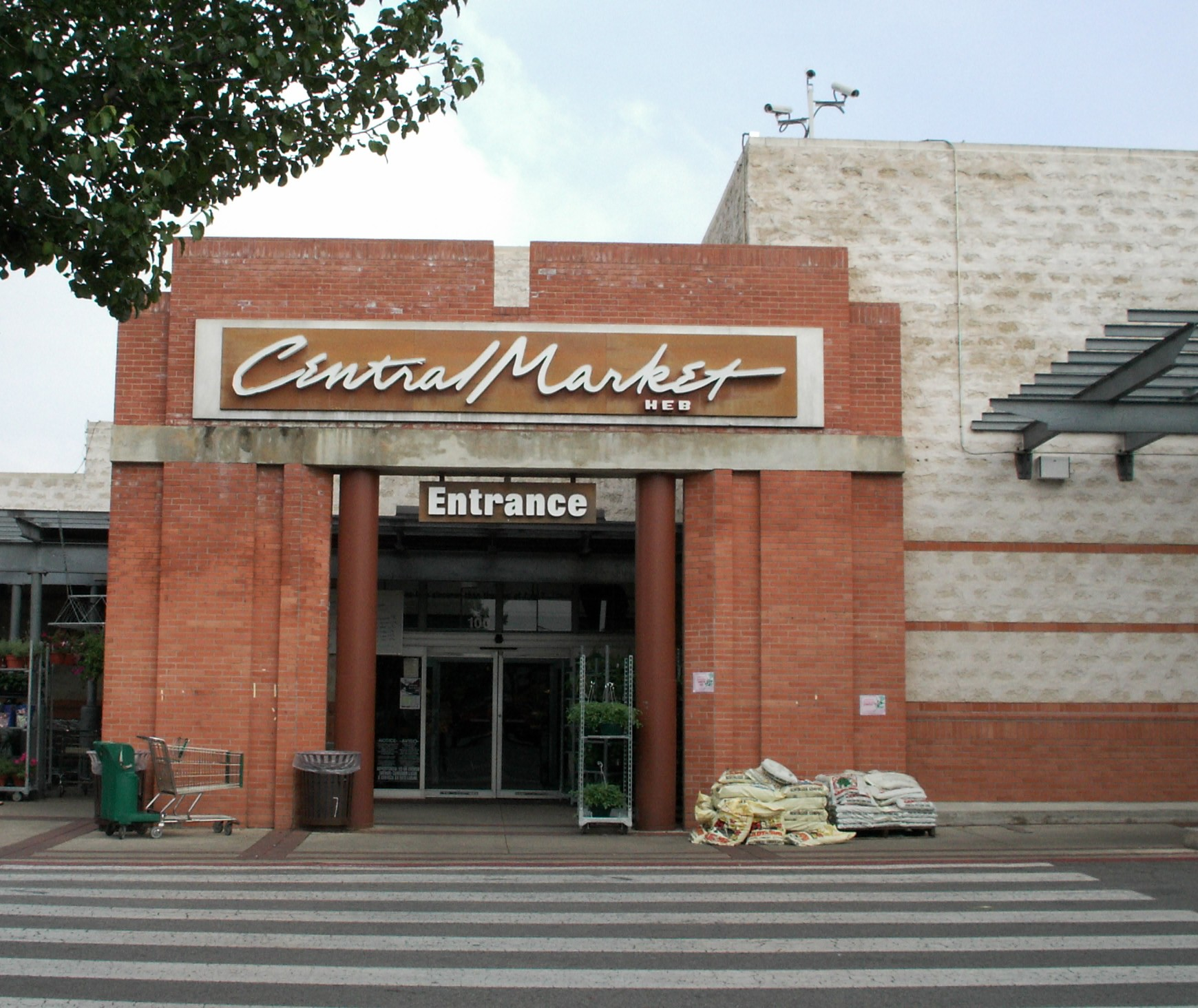
Entrance of the original North Lamar store in Austin, photographed in 2006

Central Market expanded to the San Antonio area in the late 1990s by converting an existing H-E-B on Broadway, and a second Austin store followed in 1999. A Houston location opened in 2001, after which the chain expanded in the Dallas–Fort Worth area with stores in Fort Worth, Dallas, Plano and Southlake.

In September 2018, Central Market opened a store at Midway Road and Northwest Highway in Dallas. It was the chain's tenth location in Texas and its third within Dallas. By then the Central Market division was based in Dallas. H-E-B continued to report ten Central Market locations statewide as of 2026.

In April 2026, the Dallas City Council approved zoning for a planned Central Market in Uptown Dallas, near Lemmon and McKinney avenues. Plans called for a store of approximately 60,000 sq ft (6,000 m^{2}) with a parking structure and other site improvements.

== Store format ==
Central Market uses a directed, serpentine route rather than a conventional arrangement of parallel supermarket aisles. Customers move through produce, seafood and meat before reaching wine, specialty grocery, bulk foods, dairy, bakery, deli, prepared foods and cheese. Fresh-food departments occupy a prominent part of the store, and specialty grocery products are displayed on freestanding shelving.

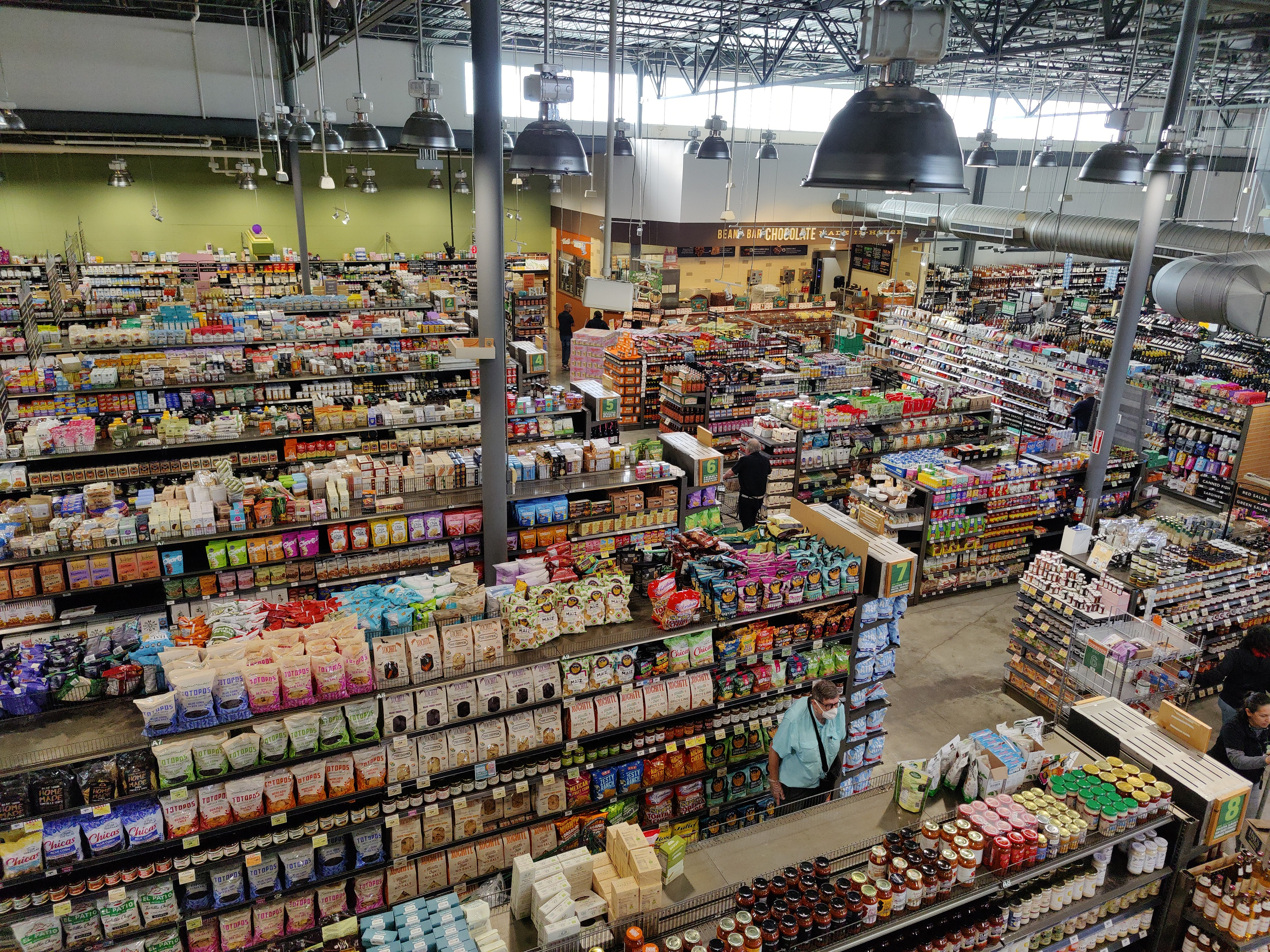
Interior of the Houston Central Market, viewed from the second floor
