= H-E-B =

American supermarket chain

H-E-B Grocery Company, LP

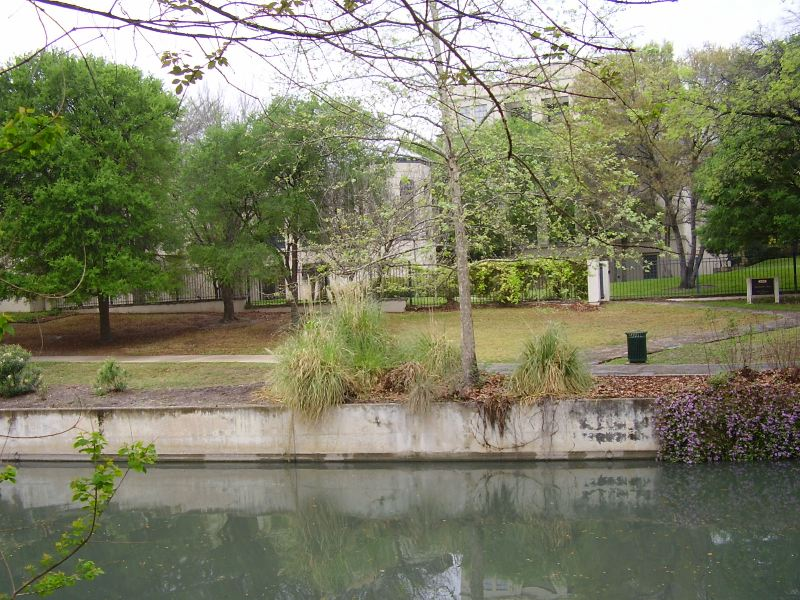
- H-E-B headquarters in San Antonio, Texas
- Trade name: H-E-B
- Type: Private
- Industry: Grocery retail
- Founded: November 26, 1905; 120 years ago in Kerrville, Texas, United States
- Founder: Florence Butt
- Headquarters: San Antonio, Texas, United States
- Number of locations: 455 (2026)
- Area served: Texas; Mexico
- Key people: Charles Butt (chairman); Howard Butt III (CEO); Roxanne Orsak (president and COO)
- Revenue: ▲US$49.6 billion (2025)
- Owner: Butt family (87%, estimated)
- Number of employees: 175,000 (2026)
- Subsidiaries: Central Market; Favor Delivery; H-E-B Mexico
- Website: www.heb.com

H-E-B Grocery Company, LP, commonly known as H-E-B, is a privately held American supermarket company headquartered in San Antonio, Texas. Founded in Kerrville in 1905 by Florence Butt, the company operates 455 stores in Texas and Mexico. Its retail formats include H-E-B supermarkets, Central Market, H-E-B Plus!, Mi Tienda and Joe V's Smart Shop. H-E-B also owns the delivery service Favor Delivery.

For fiscal 2025, Forbes listed H-E-B's revenue at $49.6 billion; the company had approximately 175,000 employees in 2026. The Butt family retains control of the company, with Forbes estimating its ownership at 87% in 2026. H-E-B also maintains an employee stock ownership program established in 2015.

== History ==
Florence Butt opened Mrs. C. C. Butt's Staple and Fancy Grocery on the ground floor of her family's home in Kerrville on November 26, 1905. Her youngest son, Howard Edward Butt, took over management of the store in 1919. In 1922, he changed the business from a credit-and-delivery operation to a self-service, cash-and-carry model, added a meat market and renamed it C.C. Butt Cash Grocery.

After several unsuccessful attempts to expand into Central Texas, Butt opened a successful store in Del Rio in 1926 and purchased three stores in the Lower Rio Grande Valley the following year. The company continued to expand through South Texas during the Great Depression and adopted the name H.E. Butt Grocery Company in the mid-1930s.

H-E-B also expanded into food manufacturing. It acquired the Harlingen Canning Company and opened a bakery in Corpus Christi in 1936. The company's headquarters moved to Corpus Christi in 1940. In 1942, it opened its first store using the H-E-B name in San Antonio. The company expanded its stores into supermarkets during the 1950s and opened a manufacturing and distribution complex in San Antonio in 1964.

Charles Butt, a grandson of Florence Butt, became president of the company in 1971. H-E-B moved its headquarters to the former San Antonio Arsenal on the San Antonio River in 1985. The H-E-B Pantry Foods format, introduced in 1988, extended the chain into East and North Texas.

H-E-B entered Mexico in 1997 with the opening of H-E-B Chipinque in the Monterrey area.

In 2015, H-E-B established the Partner Stock Plan, through which eligible employees could receive shares in the privately held company. In February 2018, H-E-B acquired Austin-based Favor Delivery for an undisclosed amount. Favor continued to operate as a separate brand.

Howard Butt III became chief executive officer in 2021, while Charles Butt remained chairman. In 2025, H-E-B announced that Roxanne Orsak would succeed Craig Boyan as president in January 2026 while retaining her position as chief operating officer. Boyan moved into a senior-adviser role ahead of a planned retirement at the end of 2026.

== Operations ==
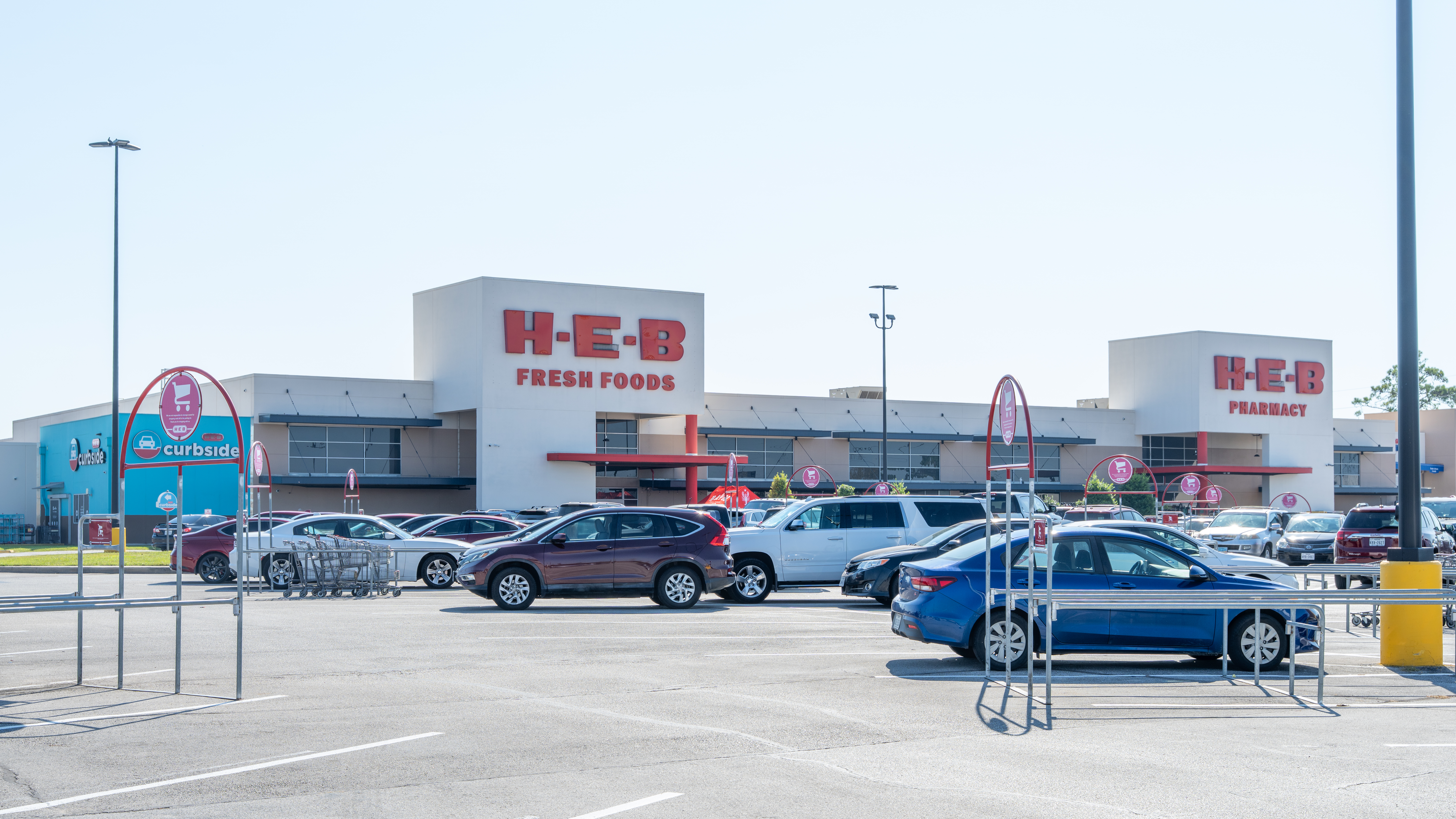
An H-E-B store in Tomball, Texas, in 2025

H-E-B's operations are concentrated in Texas and northern Mexico. As of 2026, the company operated 455 stores and employed approximately 175,000 people. In addition to its retail operations, H-E-B manufactures private-label food products and operates warehouses and distribution facilities.

In 2026, H-E-B proposed a $700 million expansion of its manufacturing and distribution complex on the east side of San Antonio. The plans included a bakery, refrigerated warehouse, transportation building and an expansion of an existing manufacturing facility. The company projected that the investment would add 720 jobs by 2028.

=== North Texas expansion ===
H-E-B maintained a presence in the Dallas–Fort Worth metroplex through Central Market and other formats before beginning a major expansion of its namesake H-E-B supermarkets into the region in 2022. The first namesake H-E-B in the DFW Metroplex opened in Frisco on September 21, 2022, followed by a store in Plano on November 2.

The company subsequently opened namesake stores across the region. In June 2026, an H-E-B in Irving became the company's first namesake supermarket in Dallas County. A store in Murphy opened the following month; with that opening, H-E-B said it operated 14 namesake H-E-B stores, three Joe V's Smart Shop locations and six Central Market stores in the DFW region.

In May 2026, the Dallas City Council approved plans for the first namesake H-E-B supermarket within the city of Dallas, with construction expected to begin in 2027.

=== Store formats ===
==== Central Market ====
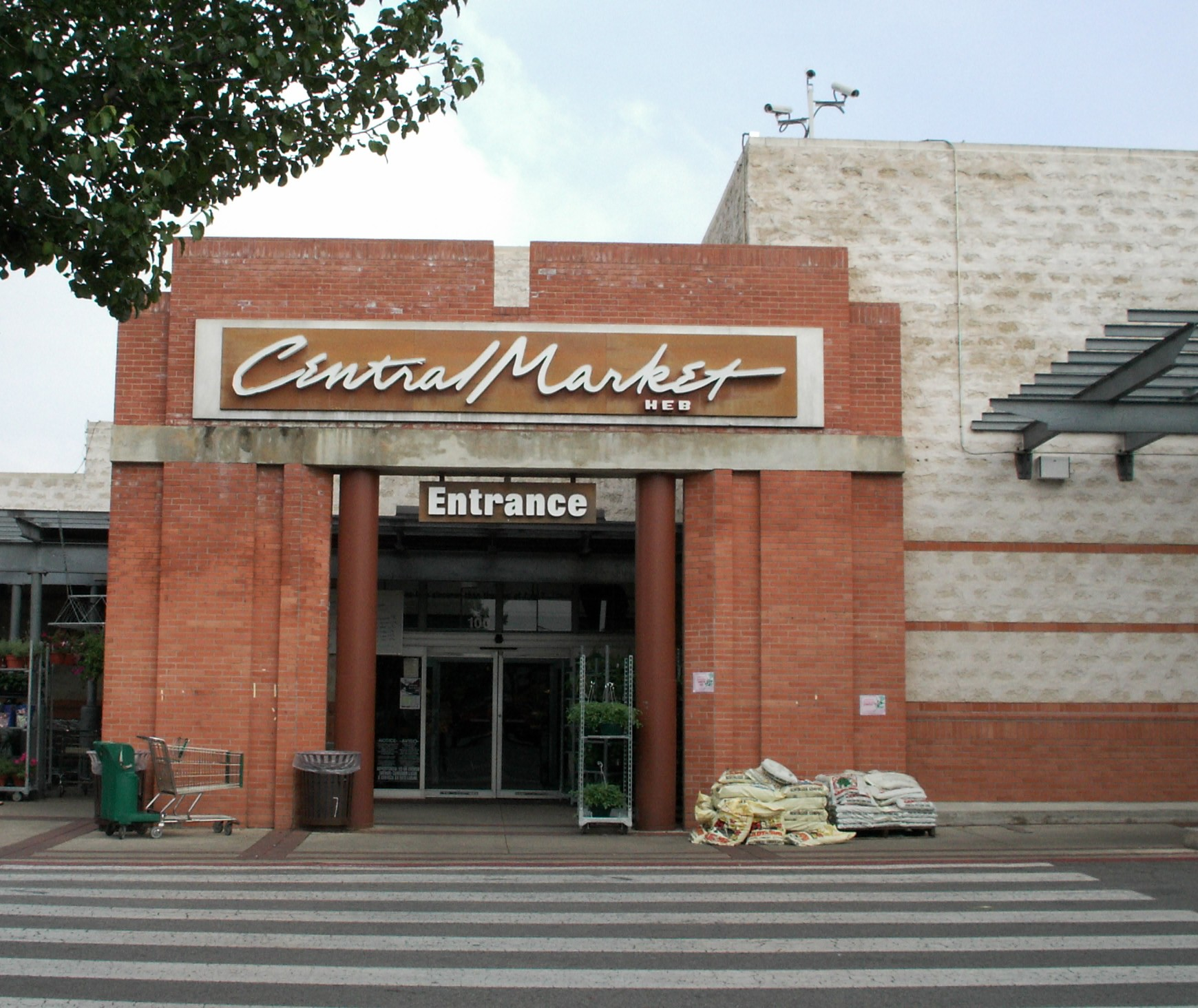
A Central Market store in Austin

H-E-B opened the first Central Market in Austin in 1994. The specialty-grocery format emphasizes fresh, international and specialty foods. Central Market operates 10 stores in Texas.

==== H-E-B Plus! ====
H-E-B introduced H-E-B Plus! in 2004, initially opening locations in Austin, Corpus Christi and Waco. The format uses larger stores with expanded general-merchandise and nonfood selections in addition to groceries.

==== Mi Tienda ====
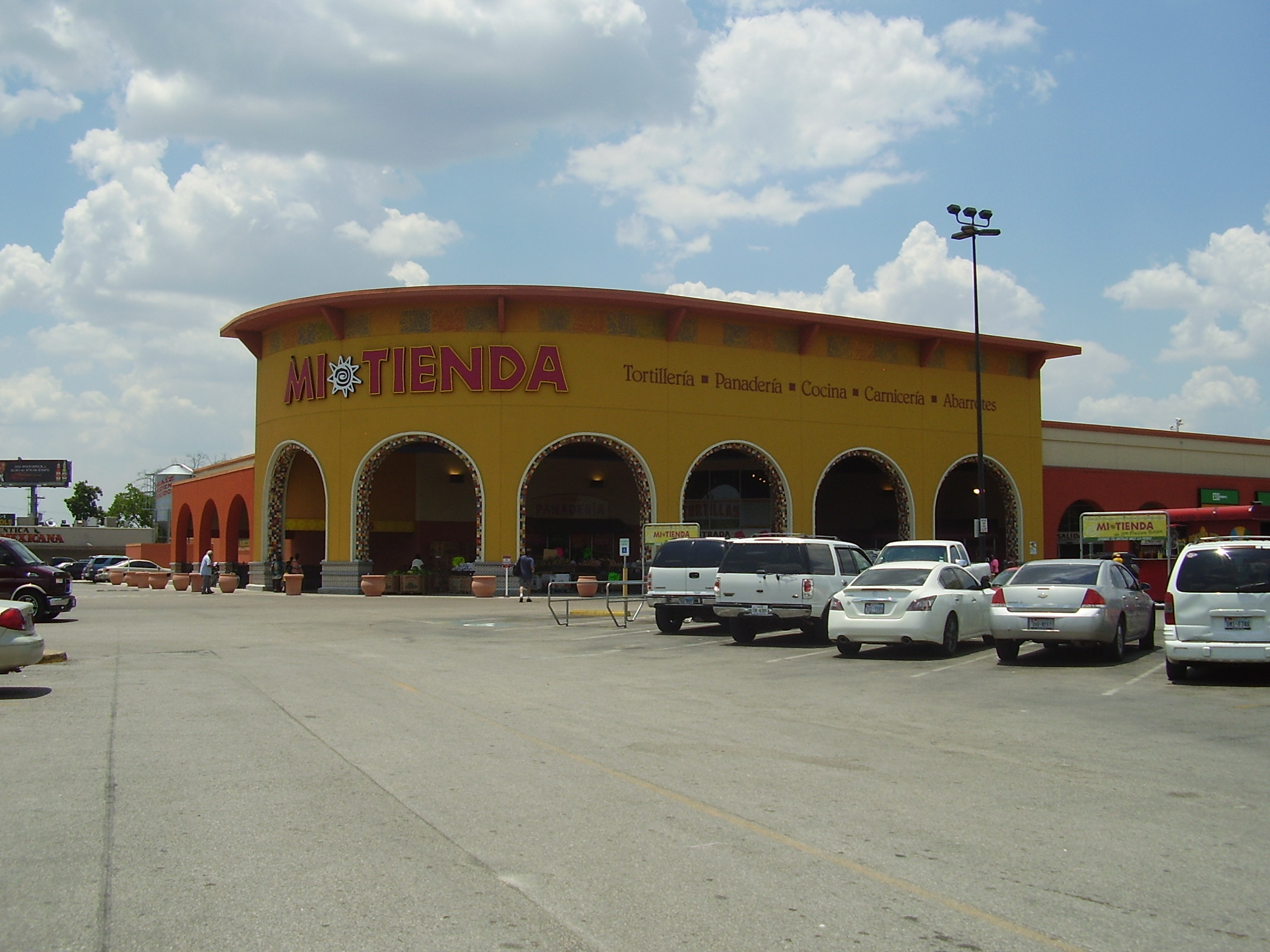
A Mi Tienda store in the Houston area

H-E-B launched Mi Tienda in the Houston area in 2006. The format focuses on Mexican and Latin American foods and uses design elements intended to evoke a traditional Mexican market. A second location opened in northeast Houston in 2011.

As of May 2026, the two stores remained in operation; a third Mi Tienda was under development in Houston's Sharpstown area.

==== Joe V's Smart Shop ====
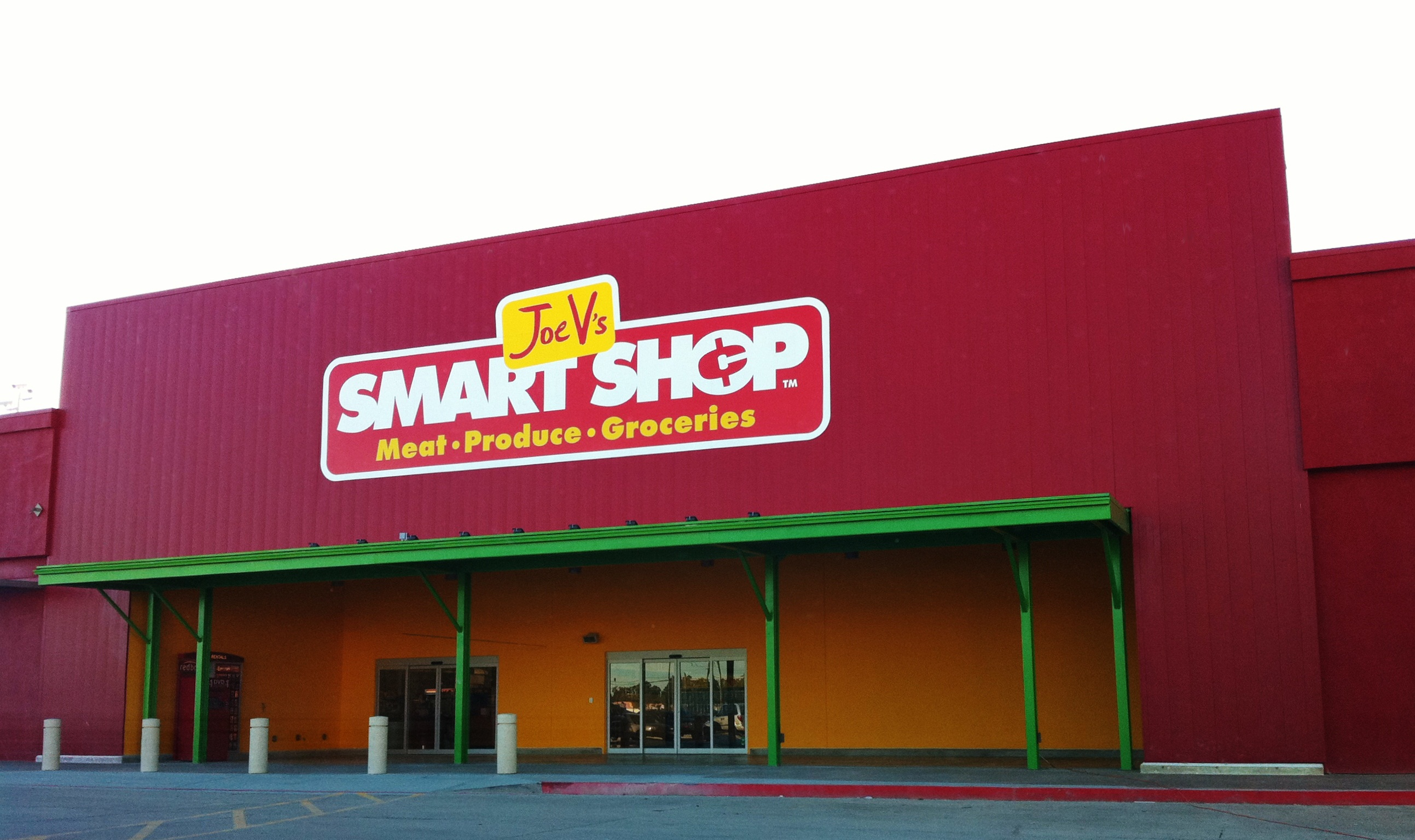
A Joe V's Smart Shop in the Houston area

H-E-B opened the first Joe V's Smart Shop in Houston in 2010. The discount format operates smaller stores than typical H-E-B supermarkets and carries a narrower assortment, with some merchandise displayed on pallets to reduce operating costs.

By July 2026, Joe V's had 14 locations statewide: 11 in the Houston region and three in North Texas. H-E-B had announced two additional Houston-area stores for 2027.

==== True Texas BBQ ====
True Texas BBQ is a barbecue-restaurant concept located inside selected H-E-B stores. The 50th True Texas BBQ location opened inside the H-E-B store in Euless in May 2026.

== Mexico ==
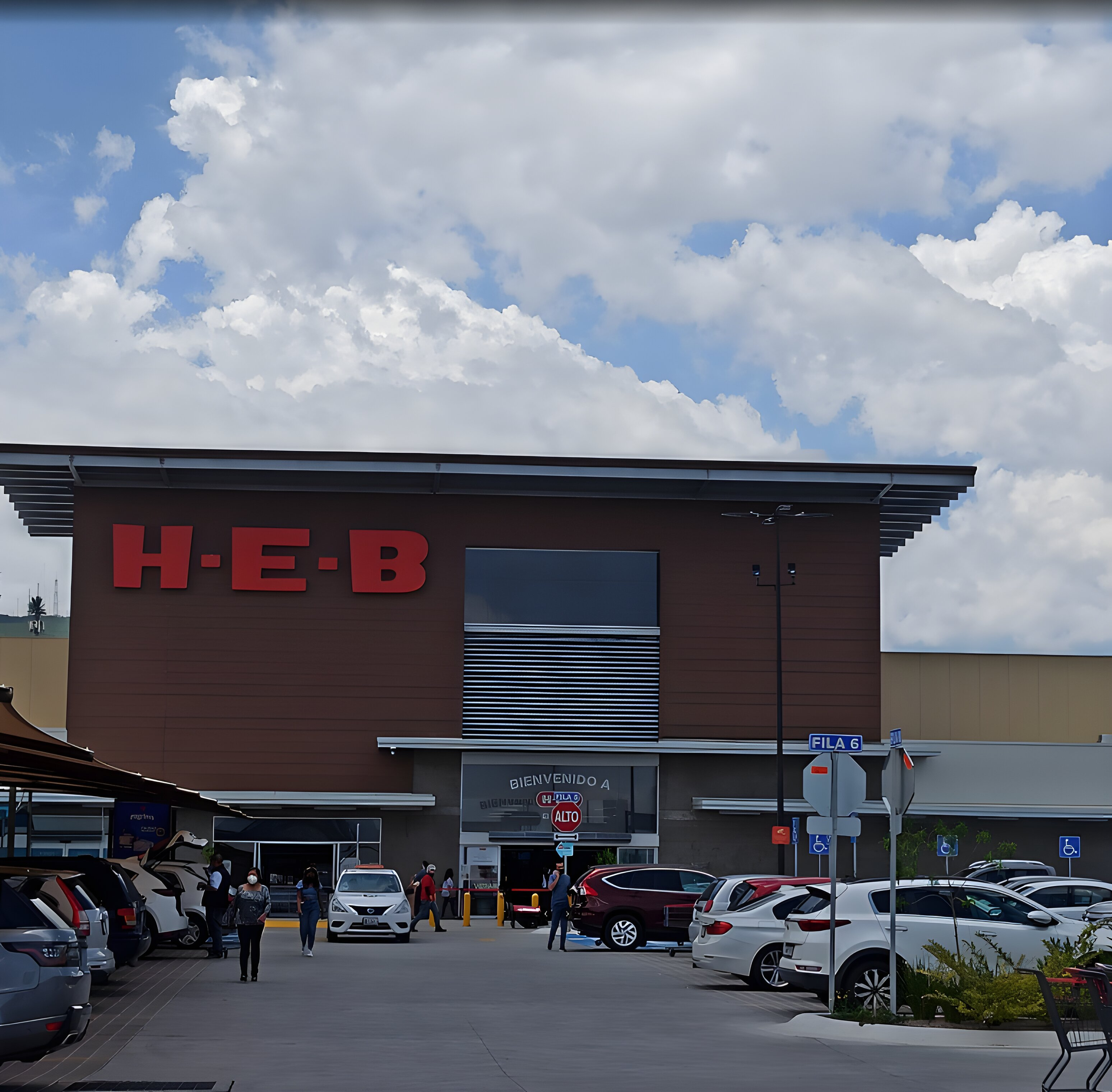
An H-E-B supermarket in Santiago de Querétaro, Mexico

H-E-B entered Mexico in 1997 with the opening of H-E-B Chipinque in the Monterrey area. The company opened its first distribution center in Nuevo León in 2004 and introduced online grocery shopping in Mexico in 2015.

H-E-B México states that it operates 87 stores in the country and employs more than 18,000 people. Its Mexican operations include 60 namesake H-E-B stores, specialty-format stores and Mi Tienda del Ahorro, a discount format introduced in 2008.

== Litigation ==
In 1983, San Antonio grocery chain Handy Andy filed a $140 million antitrust lawsuit accusing H-E-B of predatory pricing. Centeno, another local grocer, later joined the litigation. Handy Andy settled its claims in 1985, while Centeno continued its case in federal court before settling in 1988. H-E-B denied allegations that it had used below-cost pricing to drive competitors from the market.

In 2014, H-E-B paid $12 million to settle a whistleblower lawsuit alleging that it had submitted inflated prescription prices to Texas Medicaid and received reimbursements exceeding those permitted under the program.

== Philanthropy and disaster response ==
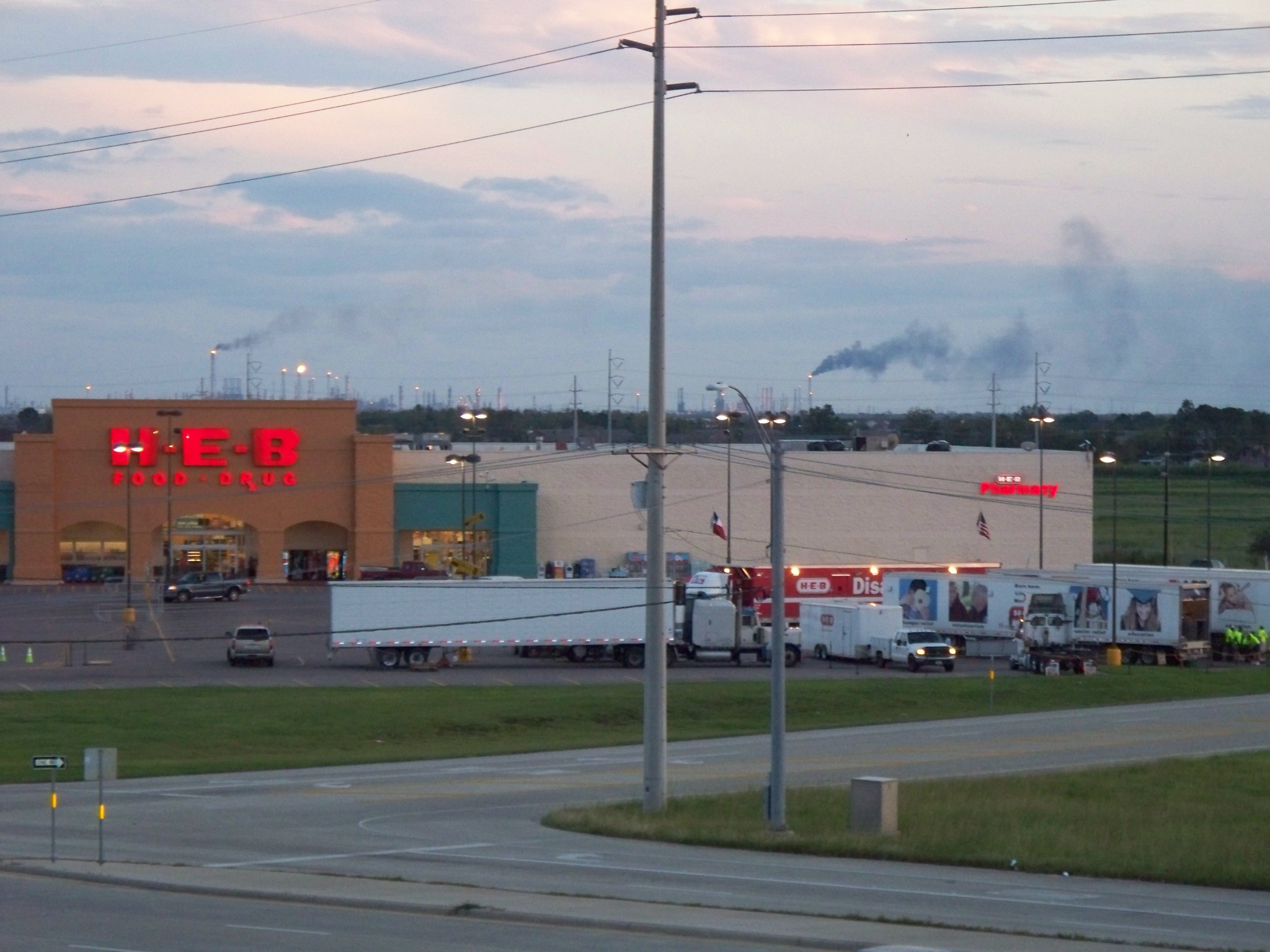
Recovery crews assembled at an H-E-B store in Port Arthur, Texas, after Hurricane Ike in 2008

H-E-B has a long history of charitable giving in the communities where it operates. According to the Handbook of Texas, the company has historically donated about 5% of its pretax earnings to civic and charitable organizations.

The company has also become known for using its logistics network during natural disasters in Texas, deploying mobile kitchens, water tankers and other emergency resources and distributing food, water and supplies in affected communities. Its disaster-response operations have been used during events including hurricanes and the 2021 Texas power crisis.
