= List of television manufacturers =

This is a list of television manufacturers, past and present.

== List ==
Company	Manufacturing		Notes
Company	Began	Ceased	Notes
Acer Inc.	2001	2009	ASUS
Admiral	1940	1979	
AGA AB	1952	-	
Aiwa	-	-	
Akai	c. 1966	present	
Alba	1939	present	Formerly part of Harvard International.
Amstrad	-	-	
Andrea smith Electronics	1947	1978	
Apex Digital	1997	2010	
Apple Inc.	1993	1994	The Macintosh TV was discontinued four months after its release; later produced the set-top device Apple TV.
Arcam	2011	present	
Arise India	2012	present	
Audiovox	-	-	Now Voxx International
Avegon	1964	-	
AWA	1956	1974	
Baird	1926	1980	Made the first TVs, brand name after 1956.
Bang & Olufsen	1950 (prototype)	present	
Beko	-	-	
BenQ	-	-	
Binatone	-	-	
Blaupunkt	-	present	
BPL Group	1980	present	
Brionvega	1947	1956	
Bush	1937	present	
Canadian General Electric	2009	present	
Cello Electronics	1996	present	
Changhong	1958	present	
ChiMei	-	-	
Compal Electronics	-	present	
Conar Instruments	1962	-	
Conrac	1949	1987	
Continental Edison	-	-	
Cossor	-	-	Later A.C. Cossor
Craig	-	-	
Crosley, division of AVCO	1947	1956	Not to be confused with current Crosley brands
Curtis Mathes Corporation	1960	present	
Daewoo	-	-	
Dell	2003	2008	
Delmonico International Corporation	1967	-	
DuMont Laboratories	1938	c. 1970	
Durabrand	2003	present	
Durastar	1994	2009	
Dynatron	-	-	
English Electric	1950	1957	
English Electric Valve Company	-	-	
EKCO	-	-	
Electrohome	1949	1987	After 1987, televisions were manufactured by Mitsubishi under the Electrohome brand name.
Element Electronics	2006	present	
Emerson Radio & Phonograph	1947	1973	
EMI	-	-	
Farnsworth	1947	1965	
Ferguson Electronics	-	-	
Ferranti	-	-	
Finlux (Vestel)	1971	present	
Fisher Electronics	-	-	
Fujitsu	1992	present	
Funai	c. 1980	present	
Geloso	1931	1972	
General Electric	1947	1986	Taken over by Thomson Gazer
General Electric Company	-	-	UK manufacturer, unrelated to US manufacturer of the same name
Goodmans Industries	-	-	
Google	2002	present	
Gradiente	-	-	Now IGB Eletrônica
Graetz	-	-	
Grundig	1966	present	
Haier	1984	present	
Hallicrafters	1932	1966	Began selling TVs in 1947
Hannspree	-	-	Now HannStar Display Corporation
Heath Company/Heathkit	1964	1989	
Hinari Domestic Appliances	-	-	
Hisense	1970	present	
Hitachi	1956	present	
Hoffman Television (Cortron Ind)	1948	1970	
Itel	-	present	
ITT Corporation	-	-	
Jensen Loudspeakers	2003	present	
JVC	1976	present	
KEC	1973	-	Sold in the US as KTV.
Kenmore	2015	2017	
Kent Television	1951	1964	
Kolin	1964	present	
Kloss Video	1981	-	
Kogan	2006	present	
Kolster-Brandes	-	-	
Konka	1984	present	
Lanix	-	-	
Le.com	-	-	
LG Electronics	1958	present	Founded as GoldStar in 1958, rebranded as LG following corporate merger.
Lloyd's Electronics	1986	1988	
Loewe	1923	present	
Luxor	-	-	
Magnavox	1948	present	Since 1976, Magnavox has been a subsidiary of Philips.
Marantz	1992	present	
Marconiphone	-	-	
Matsui	-	-	Now part of Dixons Retail
Memorex	1961	present	
Micromax	2009	present	
Metz	-	present	
Mitsubishi	-	2012	
Mivar	1945	-	
Motorola	1947	1974	
Muntz (Howard Radio)	1948	1973	
Murphy Radio	-	-	
NEC	c. 1950	-	
Nokia	-	-	
Nordmende	-	c. 1990	
Onida	1990	present	
Orion (Hungary)	-	-	
Orion (Japan)	-	-	
Packard Bell, Teledyne Packard Bell	1948	1974	
Panasonic (National)	1959	present	
Pensonic	-	present	
Philco (Philco-Ford)	1947	1976	
Philips	c. 1930	present	
Pioneer	1985	2010	
Planar Systems	1983	present	
Polaroid	-	-	
Polytron	1975	present	
ProLine	-	-	Now part of Fnac Darty
ProScan	c. 1990	present	Division of Technicolor SA
Pye	-	-	
Pyle USA	-	-	
Quasar	-	-	
RadioShack	-	-	
Radiowealth	1955	-	
Rauland-Borg	1942	1948	
RCA	1939	1986	Taken over by Thomson.
Realistic	-	-	
Rediffusion	-	present	
SABA	-	present	
Salora	1956	present	
Salora International	1977	present	
Samsung	1970	present	
Sansui	1987	present	
Sanyo	1953	present	
Schneider Electric	-	-	
Seiki Digital	2009	present	
Sèleco	1984	-	
Setchell Carlson	1950	1970	
Setron	1966	1979	
Sharp	1953	present	
Siemens	-	-	
Singer	-	-	
Skyworth	1992	present	
Sony	1960	present	
Soyo	-	2009	
Stromberg-Carlson	1950	1957	
Supersonic	-	-	
Sylvania	1949	1983	
Symphonic	1984	-	
Tandy	-	-	
Tanin	-	-	
Tatung Company	1979	present	
TCL Corporation	1981	present	
Technics	-	-	
TECO	-	-	
Teleavia	-	-	
Telefunken	1903	present	
Teletronics	1970	-	Now part of UREI
Thomson SA	c. 1940	present	some sold under RCA and GE brands after bankruptcy some assets were sold to Videocon and TCL, continued as Technicolor
Thorn Electrical Industries	-	-	
Thorn EMI	-	-	
Toshiba	1952	2015	
TPV Technology	-	present	
TP Vision	2012	present	Joint venture between Philips and TPV
Ultra	-	-	
Union	1960	2007	Former joint venture between Union Industries Inc. and Hitachi in the Philippines. Branded as Hitachi-Union and Union-Hitachi until 1990.
United States Television Manufacturing Corp.	1945	1950	
Vestel	c. 1980	present	
Videocon	c. 1980	present	
Videoton	1959	-	
Vizio	2002	present	
Vu Televisions	2006	present	Founded in California
Walton	2001	present	
Westinghouse Electric Corporation	1947	1969	
Westinghouse Electronics	2003	present	
White-Westinghouse	-	-	
Xiaomi	2017	present	
Zanussi	-	-	
Zenith Radio	1948	present	Owned by LG
Zonda	-	-	
