= Salora =

Salora may refer to:

- Salora Oy, a former consumer electronics manufacturer in Salo, Finland
- Salora International, an Indian conglomerate
