= Setchell =

Setchell is a surname. Notable people with the surname include:

- Gary Setchell (born 1975), English football player
- Marcus Setchell (born 1943), British obstetrician and gynecologist
- William Albert Setchell (1864–1943), American botanist

== See also ==
- Sarah Setchel (1803–1894), English water-colour painter
- Setchell Carlson, American electronics manufacturer
