= Transvision =

Transvision may refer to:

- Transvision (Indonesia), an Indonesian subscription-based direct broadcast satellite provider service
- Transvision (Alva Noto EP), a 2005 album by German electronic artist Alva Noto
- TransVision, an annual conference held by Humanity+ from 1998 to 2007 and 2018 to 2020
- Transvision (manufacturer), a television manufacturer from 1947 to 1967
- Transvision, an Irish large-format network of digital screens in commuter venues partnered with RTÉ News and Current Affairs

== See also ==
- Transvision Vamp, an English alternative rock band active from 1986 to 1992
