= IGR =

IGR may refer to:

- Iguazu International Airport serving Puerto Iguazú and the nearby falls
- IGR Iwate Ginga Railway in Iwate Prefecture, Japan
- Imperial Japanese Government Railways (or, domestically, Imperial Government Railways) of early 20th century Japan
- Indiana Guard Reserve, the state defense force of Indiana
- International Gay Rugby
- Insect growth regulator, a chemical that disrupts the growth and/or development of insects
- The Interessengemeinschaft für Rundfunkschutzrechte (IGR), a broadcasting "IP" rights interest group
  - IGR Stereo, a German standard for analogue TV stereo audio transmission claimed by the above organization.
- Intergenic region
- Integral Gamma-Ray source, a catalog based on observations by the INTEGRAL telescope
