= Vestfrost =

Danish homewares maker

Vestfrost or Vestfrost Household is a manufacturer of major appliance. The company is based in Esbjerg, Denmark. Since 1963 they have sold more than 12 million refrigerators and freezers. In 2008 Vestfrost was bought by the Turkish appliance manufacturer Vestel. In 2006 they had more than 300 employees in Esbjerg. In 2007 they had DKK 918,000,000 in revenue. Today most of the manufacturing is localised in Turkey and Slovakia. Their product range include refrigerators, freezers, washing machines, wine cellular, ovens and hobs.
