= Seiki Digital =

American television manufacturing company

- Type: Subsidiary
- Industry: Consumer electronics Home appliances
- Founded: Orange, California, U.S. 2010
- Headquarters: Diamond Bar, California, U.S.
- Key people: Sung Choi, VP
- Parent: Tsinghua Tongfang
- Website: www.seiki.com

Seiki Digital is a television manufacturer with its corporate headquarters at 1550 Valley Vista Dr., Suite 210, Diamond Bar, CA 91765, USA. Seiki Digital is wholly owned by the Chinese-based Tsinghua Tongfang Company. The company is noted for manufacturing very inexpensive HD and Ultra HD LCD televisions.

== History ==
The company was founded in 2010 in Orange, California, and is headquartered in Diamond Bar, California. This is also the headquarters of Westinghouse Electronics, another subsidiary of Tsinghua Tongfang. In 2018, the company began manufacturing home kitchen appliances.
