= Westinghouse Licensing Corporation =

Subsidiary that manages the Westinghouse brand

Wilmerding Licensing Corporation
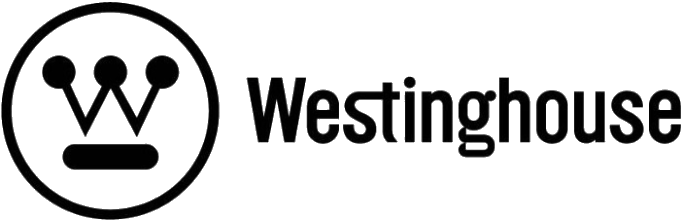
- Formerly: Westinghouse Licensing Corporation
- Type: Subsidiary
- Industry: Brand management Trademark management
- Predecessor: Westinghouse Electric (1886)
- Founded: 1997; 29 years ago
- Headquarters: New York, New York, U.S.
- Website: westinghouse.com/

The Westinghouse Licensing Corporation is (or was) a Delaware General Corporation Law–organized subsidiary that was founded in 1998 by Westinghouse-CBS (the renamed original Westinghouse) in managing the intellectual property assets relating to the Westinghouse trademarks produced from 1886 until 1996. The Westinghouse name and trademarks were purchased from ViacomCBS in 2021 by a new company called Westinghouse Electric Corporation.

Westinghouse Licensing had its headquarters in New York City.

As of 2026, the website at westinghouse.com is identified as being operated by Westinghouse Electric Corporation.

== History ==
All traces of the Westinghouse name go back to the original company's roots starting in 1886 when George Westinghouse founded the company in Pittsburgh, Pennsylvania.

After the original Westinghouse Electric Corporation acquired CBS Inc., it set about transforming itself from a diversified conglomerate with strong industrial roots into a media giant. Starting in 1996, it began selling off many of its non-media assets. In 1997, Westinghouse acquired Infinity Broadcasting Corporation and was reorganized as the first CBS Corporation, taking on the name of the broadcasting network.

In 1999, CBS Corporation sold all of its nuclear businesses to BNFL and Westinghouse, thus jettisoning its last significant non-media assets. Soon after, BNFL gained license rights on the Westinghouse trademarks and used them to reorganize its newly acquired nuclear assets as Westinghouse Electric Company LLC. Those companies were later sold to the Toshiba Group in 2007, then Brookfield Business Partners in 2018.

== Licensing of the brand ==
Westinghouse (brand)
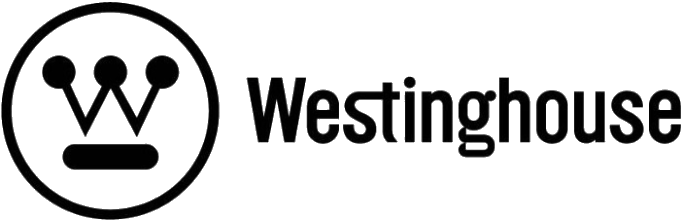
- Product type: Licensed brandname
- Current owner: Westinghouse Electric Corporation
- Country: U.S.
- Introduced: 1886
- Related brands: White-Westinghouse
- Previous owners: Westinghouse Electric (1886)
- Tagline: "Innovation you can be sure of", "You Can Be Sure...If It's Westinghouse"
- Website: westinghouse.com

Beginning in 1998, Westinghouse Licensing had licensed the famous brand for use on a multitude of products, some of which were in similar categories to those sold by the historic version of the company. Though these products were advertised using the Westinghouse brand name, they were not manufactured by the historic Westinghouse company.

=== Active licensees ===
These were the Westinghouse licensees manufacturing products under the "Westinghouse" and "White-Westinghouse" names up until 2021:

- Westinghouse Electric Company LLC, providing nuclear energy worldwide
- TECO-Westinghouse Motor Company (previously Westinghouse Heavy Industry Motor Division, HIMD), maintaining the original Westinghouse large electric motor designs and manufacturing new motors & generators from ¼ hp to 100,000 hp
- Westinghouse Battery, selling general-purpose batteries, industrial sealed lead–acid batteries, and LED flashlights
- Westinghouse Lighting Corporation, formerly Angelo Brothers Lighting, selling light bulbs, ceiling fans, and lighting fixtures
- The NCC, selling Westinghouse-branded electrical accessories
- Electrolux Group, selling Westinghouse branded refrigerators, washing machines and dishwashers in Australia
- Westinghouse Electronics, selling Westinghouse-branded LCD televisions and computer monitors
