= Interessengemeinschaft für Rundfunkschutzrechte =

German patent holding company

The Interessengemeinschaft für Rundfunkschutzrechte GmbH Schutzrechtsverwertung & Co. KG. ("IGR GmbH") is a patent holding company established by leading German radio and TV set manufacturers.

In the early 1980s the IGR GmbH got widely known for trying to restrict access of Japanese electronics companies to the German TV set market by way of patent licenses. At that time, a standard for providing stereophonic TV sound had been developed by the Institut für Rundfunktechnik. In 1980, the IGR GmbH acquired the then pending patent applications related to this standard for 150.000 DM (about 75.000 €) and granted patent licenses to its members only. The IGR GmbH planned to grant limited licenses to non-members at a later date.

In 1981, Salora, a Finnish TV set manufacturer, was unable to fulfill its contracts with major German mail-order firms after the IGR GmbH obtained an injunction from a court. Following a complaint by Salora, the European Commission started antitrust investigations against IGR GmbH but terminated the proceeding when IGR GmbH agreed to immediately grant unlimited licenses to Salora.

However, IGR GmbH and its members continued to leverage their position by requiring other European manufacturers to pay royalties. This led to further investigations of the European Commission in 1983 which alleged that this was an infringement of European Union's rules on competition. IGR GmbH thereafter dropped license fees considerably which led the European Commission to close the case.
