= Vestel =

Electronics manufacturing company based in Turkey

Vestel Elektronik Sanayi Ve Ticaret A.Ş.

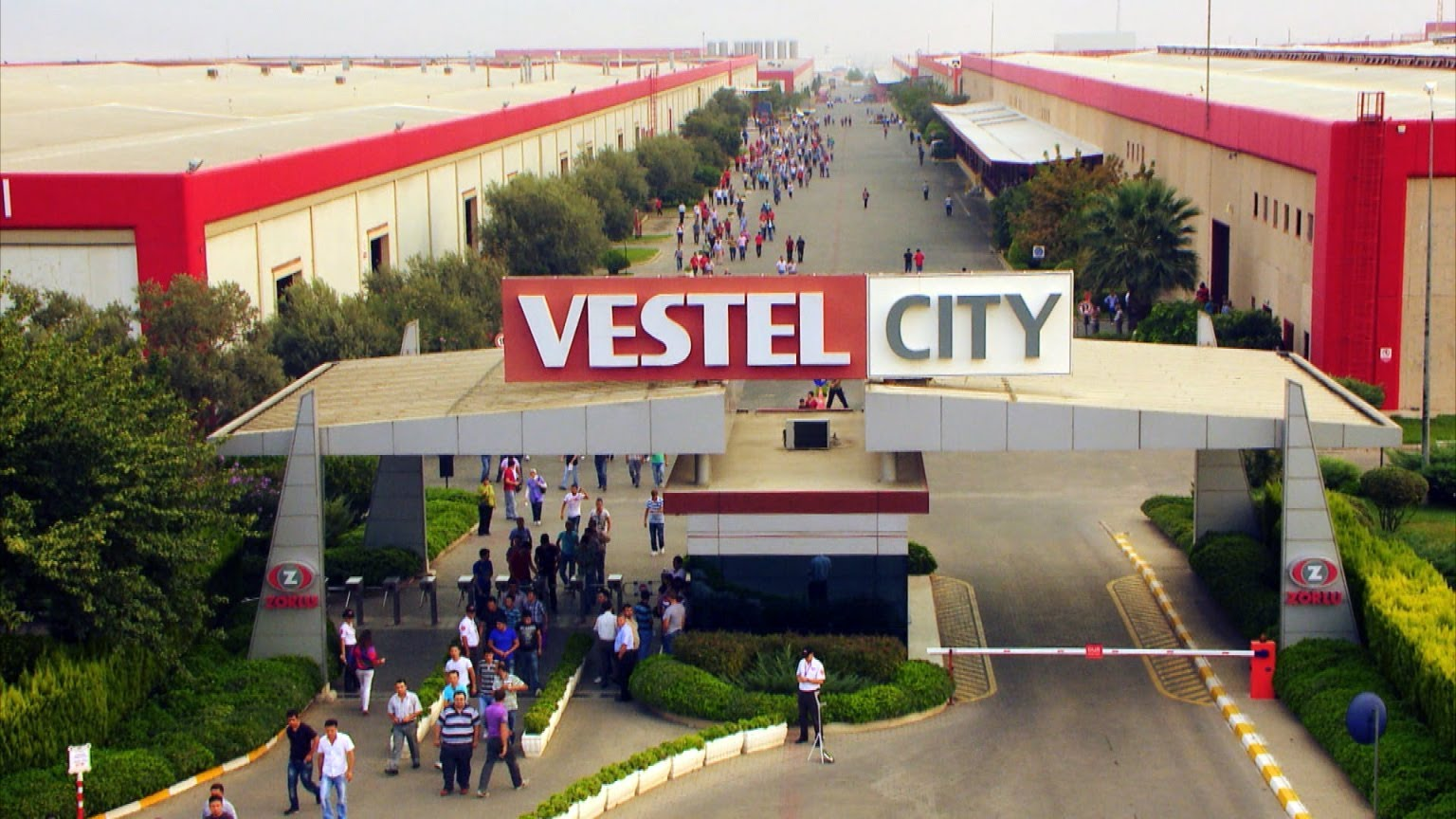
- Main factory area
- Type: Anonim Şirket
- Traded as: BİST: VESTL
- Industry: Consumer Electronics, Home Appliances, Information Technology
- Founded: 1984; 42 years ago
- Headquarters: Manisa, Turkey
- Area served: Europe, Middle East, Central Asia and United States
- Key people: Ahmet Nazif Zorlu (Chairman); Ergün Güler (CEO)
- Products: Televisions, major appliances, digital signage displays
- Brands: Various
- Revenue: ▲US$4.07 billion (2024)
- Operating income: ▲US$265 million (2023)
- Net income: ▲US$80 million (2023)
- Total assets: ▲US$4.95 billion (2024)
- Total equity: ▲US$1.48 billion (2023)
- Number of employees: 20,438
- Parent: Zorlu Holding
- Website: vestelinternational.com

Vestel Elektronik is a Turkish home and professional appliances manufacturing company specialising in electronics, major appliances and information technology. Vestel's headquarters and production plant are located in Manisa, while since 1994 the company's parent conglomerate is the Istanbul-based Zorlu Holding. They are one of the largest original design manufacturers (ODM) in the world, particularly known for white label televisions and white goods with significant share in the European market, but also produce goods under its own Vestel brand especially for the domestic Turkish market.

== Company ==
Vestel was founded in 1984 and its controlling interest acquired by the Zorlu family in 1994. Vestel Elektronik Sanayi ve Ticaret A.Ş shares have been traded on the Borsa Istanbul stock exchange since 1990. Its white goods division is named Vestel Beyaz Eşya Sanayi ve Ticaret A.Ş. which, along with Vestel Mobility, run as subsidiaries of Vestel Elektronik.

Vestel has a large manufacturing complex in Manisa known as "Vestel City", measuring 1.3 million square meters in size. As of 2021, the group has annual production capacity of 10 million units of TVs, 13.2 million white goods and 4 million digital and mobile products. Outside of Turkey, Vestel also owned and operated a factory in Alexandrov, Russia, from 2003 to 2016.

== Owned brands ==
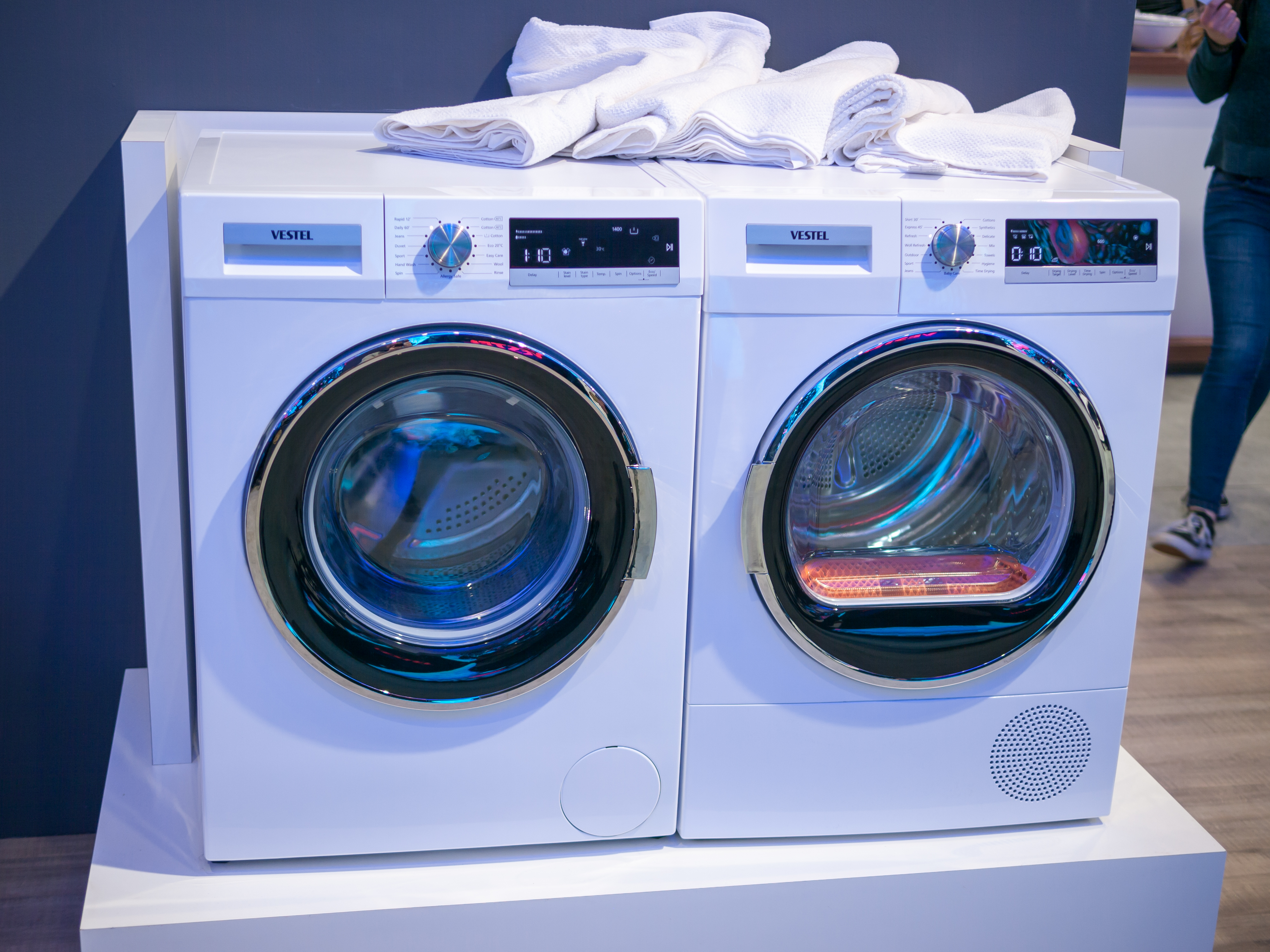
Vestel branded washing machines built by Vestel at IFA 2018, Berlin

While Vestel primarily produces consumer goods for clients under licensed brand names, the company also outright own a number of brands themselves including Vestfrost, Finlux, SEG, Regal, Luxor, Techwood, Windsor and Nexon, alongside its namesake Vestel brand.

== Televisions and white goods ==
Vestel Elektronik, together with its subsidiary brands has a significant share in the European market of consumer electronics and home appliances, in particular TV sets. As of 2006, Vestel was the largest TV producer in Europe with more than 8 million units sold, accounting for a quarter of the European market. Because the company is mainly an original design manufacturer (ODM) for other brands and a focus on low-margin budget products, Businessweek in 2011 called it the "unknown TV giant".

Most of these consist of supermarket and retailer own-brands for which Vestel has been designing and engineering. For example the ok. brand (for MediaMarkt/Saturn), Medion and Tevion (for Aldi) and the seminal old name Telefunken have been among the German names of which their TVs have been designed entirely by Vestel. In Great Britain, Bush and Alba (Argos), Technika (Tesco), Logik (Currys) and Mitchell & Brown are among the local white labels made by Vestel since at least the 2000s. Since 2012, Vestel also owns the exclusivity for Polaroid branded TVs for the British market for the retailer Asda. Other examples are Vortex and Teletech brands, both of retailers Flanco and Altex of Romania respectively, and French brand Continental Edison (of Cdiscount). More established names, such as the Japanese Hitachi, have also had their TVs and set-top boxes entirely created by Vestel since the early 2010s, while JVC have been revived through an agreement with Vestel in the same decade (after JVC itself exited the consumer TV market globally by 2011), through retailer Currys. Also, old names Luxor and Finlux, of Sweden and Finland respectively, were purchased entirely by Vestel in 2006 and since then these branded TVs are made and are marketed especially in their local region by Vestel.

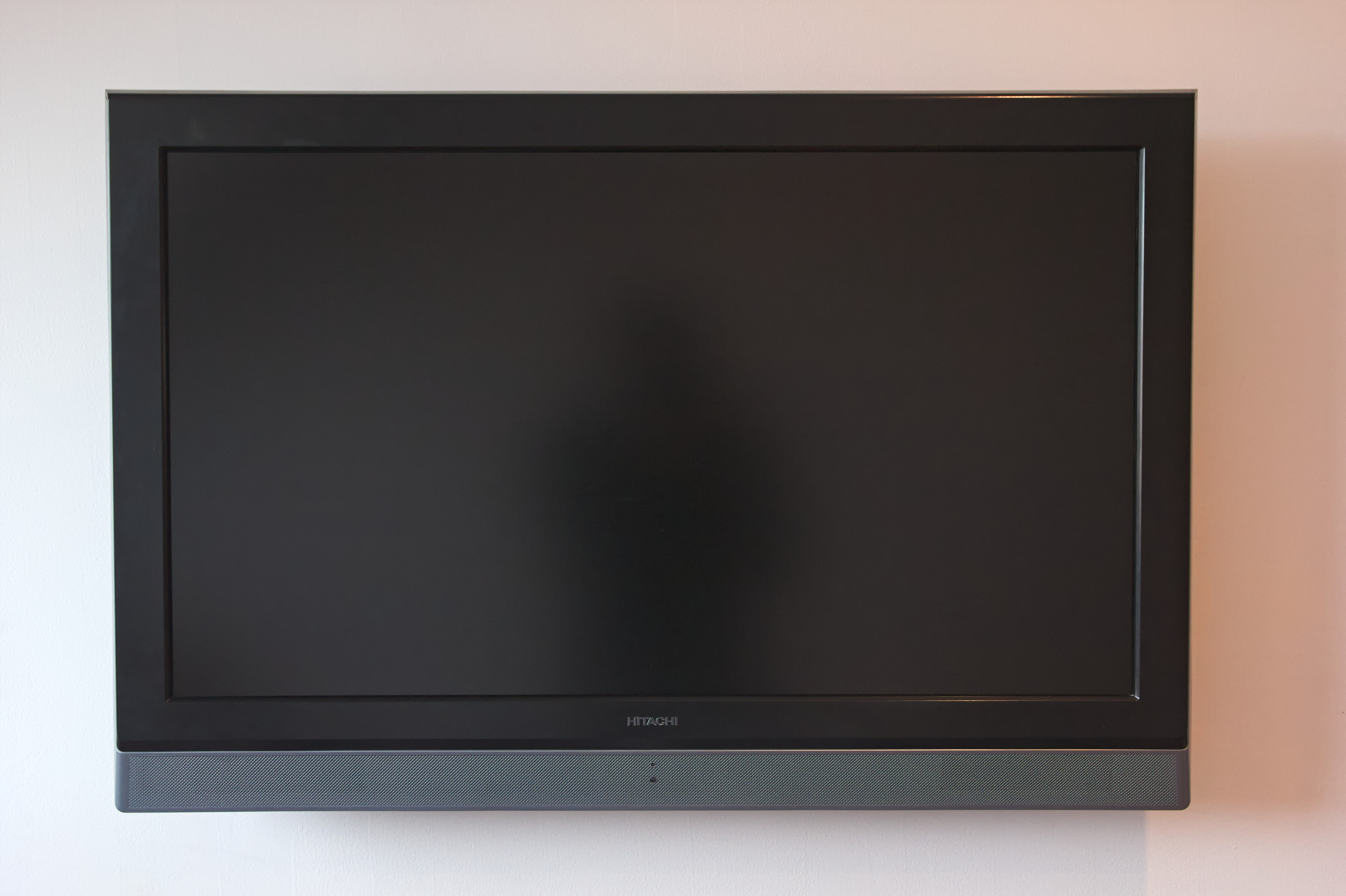
A Hitachi branded television set made entirely by Vestel

However, for lower-tier entry-level televisions, many bigger companies and names such as JVC, Hitachi, Sharp, Toshiba, and LG had already outsourced entirely their TV products in the region to Vestel as of the late 2000s, whereas most of these makers continued to design and engineer their higher margin products in-house. The price warring by companies like Samsung during the LCD flat-panel TV boom, combined with a strong yen, and a no-tariff customs union agreement between Turkey and the EU (initiated to protect domestic trade from products imported from factories in countries like China) all contributed to strengthening Vestel's position and appeal at the budget end by producing and manufacturing in Turkey. Vestel have also made products for Panasonic, who decided to outsource their entry-level TV lines in the early 2010s (Panasonic also outsourced their higher-end TVs in 2021 but under the OEM model instead, i.e. they maintain R&D and in-house engineering for those lines rather than turning them into generic white labels).

Since 2015, Vestel have been the maker of the well-known Japanese Sharp brand for white goods (not televisions). In September 2016, Vestel gained the exclusive license to make Toshiba TVs for the European market, after Toshiba decided to exit the TV making business. Vestel also purchased the Toshiba factory in Poland. This marked the most high-profile and premium TV brand name that Vestel is now in control of. It led to Vestel investing in higher-end technology which led to the release in 2017 of a Toshiba-branded OLED TV for an "accessible" price. Both Sharp and Toshiba have been treated as "flagship" brands by Vestel and enjoy slightly more advanced and sleeker designs compared to the company's other brands.

Vestel has also acted to a lesser extent as an original equipment manufacturer (OEM), such as for parts for Stellantis. They also co-manufactured mid-range and high-end Panasonic TVs until assembly moved to China in 2026 under Skyworth.

=== Software and hardware ===
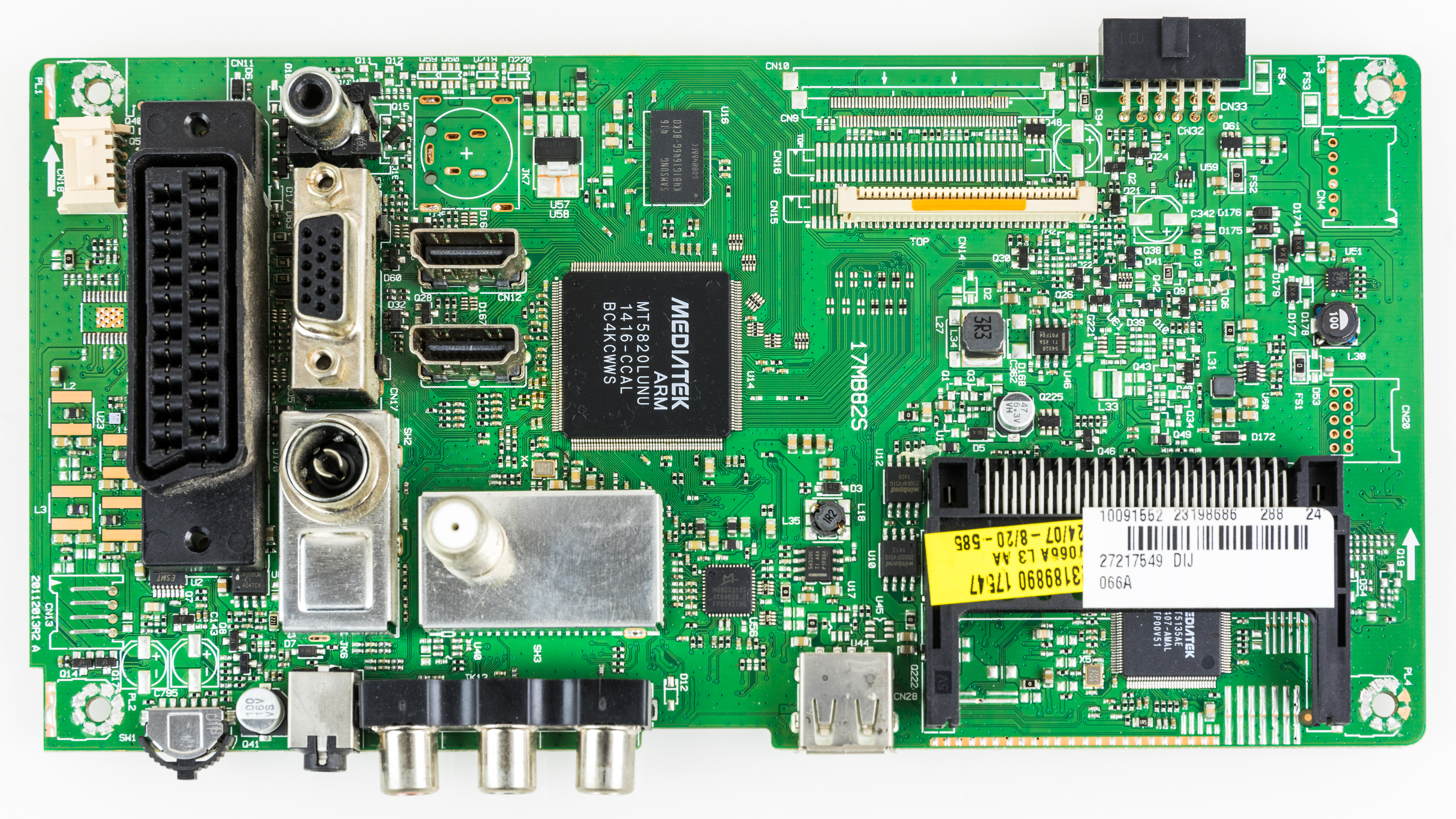
A Vestel designed television board

VeeZy is Vestel's brand-agnostic smart home IoT system and app used for its laundry, kitchen and other household appliances. Their factory lines are made to deploy a variety of different smart TV software and operating systems on TVs depending on the client's request, such as Roku OS, VIDAA, TiVo OS and Android TV. They have also provided an in-house simple smart TV platform called QUI on entry-level TVs. The family of TV main boards designed by Vestel are labelled Vestel MB17.

== Other products ==
Vestel Elektronik have also made displays, commercial screens and for clients. In 2014, Vestel entered the smartphone market with a product named Venus that has since been updated further. In 2021, Vestel launched a mobile virtual network operator in its home country on the Türk Telekom cellular network.

Other Vestel-named subsidiaries of conglomerate Zorlu have also made products in other fields. In 2006, Vestel stores distributed the Turkish-developed video game Kabus 22. The Vestel defense group Vestel Savunma (now known as Lentatek) have been responsible for designing the Vestel Karayel UAV that has seen active military service. These are not under the Vestel Elektronik subsidiary.

== See also ==
- Zorlu Holding
- Beko and its owner Arçelik, Vestel's main Turkish rival
- List of companies of Turkey
