= United States Television Manufacturing Corp. =

- Industry: Electronics
- Founded: 1945
- Defunct: 1950
- Headquarters: Manhattan, New York City
- Key people: Hamilton Hoge, president
- Products: Television sets

The United States Television Manufacturing Corporation, also known informally as U.S. Television Manufacturing, and in some advertisements as UST, was an American television manufacturing and distribution company known for its early large-screen television sets, intended for use in bars and other public spaces. The company existed from 1945 to 1950.

== History ==
The United States Television Manufacturing Corporation was founded in 1945 in Manhattan, New York City, to produce large-screen television sets and, later, conventional models. In April the following year, it announced an initial public offering of 99,000 shares of 50-cent par value common stock at US$3 each. The Guaranty Trust Company of New York was appointed registrar.

Headed by president Hamilton Hoge, with his brother John Otis Hoge as vice president, U.S. Television Manufacturing aimed its initial product at taverns, clubs, fraternal organizations and similar business consumers, reasoning that with parts and materials remaining in short supply following World War II, the company needed to sell fewer but higher-priced units.

Two views of U.S. Television Manufacturing Corp.'s Tavern Tele-Symphonic projection-TV set

On September 18, 1946, U.S. Television Manufacturing held a public demonstration of large-screen rear-projection television, with sets at department stores including Bloomingdale's and Macy's in Manhattan, Bamberger's in Brooklyn, and Abraham & Straus in Newark, New Jersey, showing live coverage of the Joe Louis-Tami Mauriello heavyweight boxing championship at Yankee Stadium in The Bronx. The company said it had already begun delivering sets to customers.

By July 1947, the company was producing 300 units a month of its initial model, it said, which were distributed by dealers in 13 states and the District of Columbia. It announced plans to produce a taller model with a 475-square-inch screen and AM-FM radio reception, to sell for US$1,995 excluding installation charges, and two home-consumer models: one with a "10-inch direct-view cathode-ray tube (CRT) screen, giving a 54-square-inch image", plus AM-FM radio and phonograph, for US$895; and a rear-projection TV with the same features but a 390-square-inch image, for US$2,275. The direct-view model's price was reduced to US$745 in November 1947.

In March the following year, the large-screen projection-TV set increased in priced to US$2,495, with the company announcing shipment to distributors in 15 cities within two to three weeks and plans to produce 50 to 75 sets monthly. The company also announced plans to market a television set for theaters and auditoriums, with a variable screen size of 9 x 12 feet to 12 x 16 feet, for US$3,495. By October 1948, the company was marketing what it called two "improved" models with 475- and 675-square-inch screens.

Product sheet for models T508, T521, T525 and T530 in the Tavern Tele-Symphonic line

Additionally, by January 1948, the company was producing a tabletop model with a 10-inch screen giving a picture size of nearly 9 by 7 inches. By November, U.S. Television Manufacturing Corp. subsidiary Zetka Television Tubes, Inc., of Clifton, New Jersey, was manufacturing 12- and 15-inch CRTs, with glass blanks supplied by Corning Glass Works.

In December 1948, the company dropped prices, citing increased supplies of 15-inch glass CRTs. The home console with radio and phonograph was now US$1,095, and table models $695 and $325.

Among its advertising and promotional efforts, the company said in August 1947 that it would launch a direct-mail campaign to 41,000 tavern-owners nationwide, via the advertising agency Huber-Hoge & Sons. In January the following year, it announced that the same agency would launch a $250,000 print-ad campaign for its tabletop sets, emphasizing quality over price.

Following the public company's 1950 report on earnings, registering a loss, no further reports were issued.

== Products ==
A CRT fires upward to a mirror that reflects a back-projection screen image on U.S. Television Manufacturing Corp.'s Tavern Tele-Symphonic model.

Each line of television includes built-in radio and phonograph.

Projection TV set

- Tavern Tele-Symphonic (includes at least models T508, T521, T525, T530), US$1,995
- Tele-Symphonic, US$2,275
- Tele-Symphonic Modern, US$2,275

Direct-view TV sets

- Telesonic (available in modern and period cabinetry), US$895

Radio-phonographs

- Dumbarton, US$239

=== Model numbers ===
- T502, T507, T508, T521, T525, T530, T621, T10823

== Key personnel ==
- Hamilton Hoge, president
- John Otis Hoge, vice president (died November 18, 1953, age 44)
- Ira T. Kitzmiller, controller; formerly with RCA for 14 years
- A.D. Heller, chief engineer, followed by
- Antony Wright, chief engineer; former manager of TV-engineering section of RCA
- Irving Mageff, project engineer
- K. Blair Benson, senior engineer
- William H. Higgins, sales manager
- Philip Goldberg, distributor, Buffalo, New York
- Kenneth Golden, distributor, The Bronx

=== Other ===
- Rumsey Electric Company, distributor, Philadelphia, Pennsylvania.
- Domestic Heating and Equipment Corp., distributor, Cleveland, Ohio

== Headquarters ==
A December 1945 advertisement seeking a senior engineer for the company listed an address of 106 Seventh Avenue in Manhattan, New York City. By July 1947, the company's office was located at 1 West 61st Street in Manhattan. An advertisement from this time gives a company address of 3 West 61st Street.

== Earnings and revenue ==
The company reported a net loss of US$98,000 for the first six months of 1946. For the same period of 1947, it posted an estimated net profit of US$188,355 after taxes and after utilizing one-half of the company's 1946 tax loss of US$176,707. The half-year net profit represented 59 cents each on 319,000 common shares.

For full-year 1947, the company reported net sales of US$1,907,874, resulting in a net loss of US$132,686. In 1948, U.S Television Manufacturing Corp. turned a net profit of US$27,035, representing 4¢ each on 341,475 common shares. The following year, the company reported a loss of US$195,094.
