= Geloso =

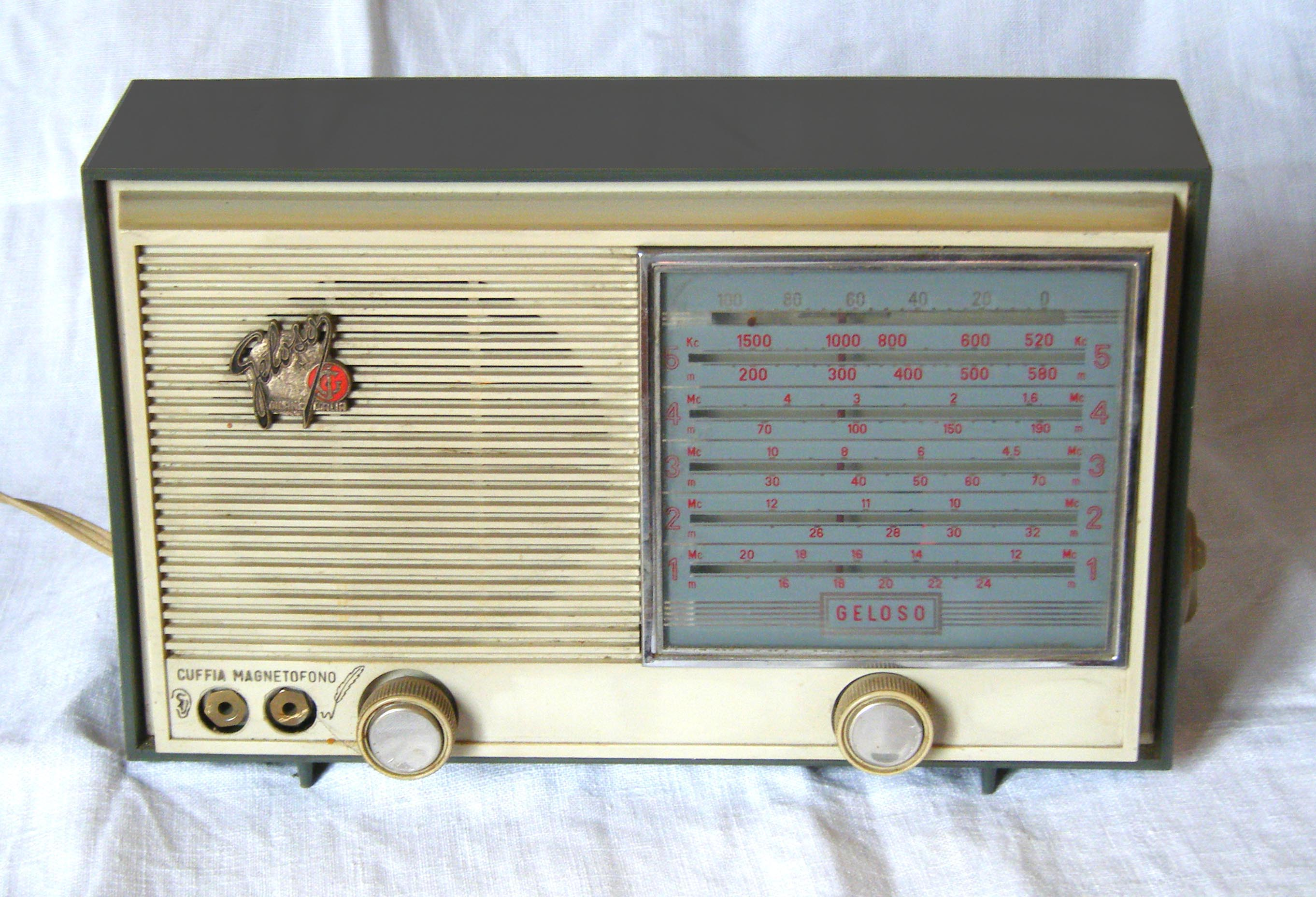
- Geloso Sideral, 1965

Geloso, founded in 1931 by Giovanni Geloso, was an Italian manufacturer of radios, televisions, amplifiers, amateur radio receivers, audio equipment and electronic components. Its headquarters were situated in Milan, viale Brenta, 29.

== History ==
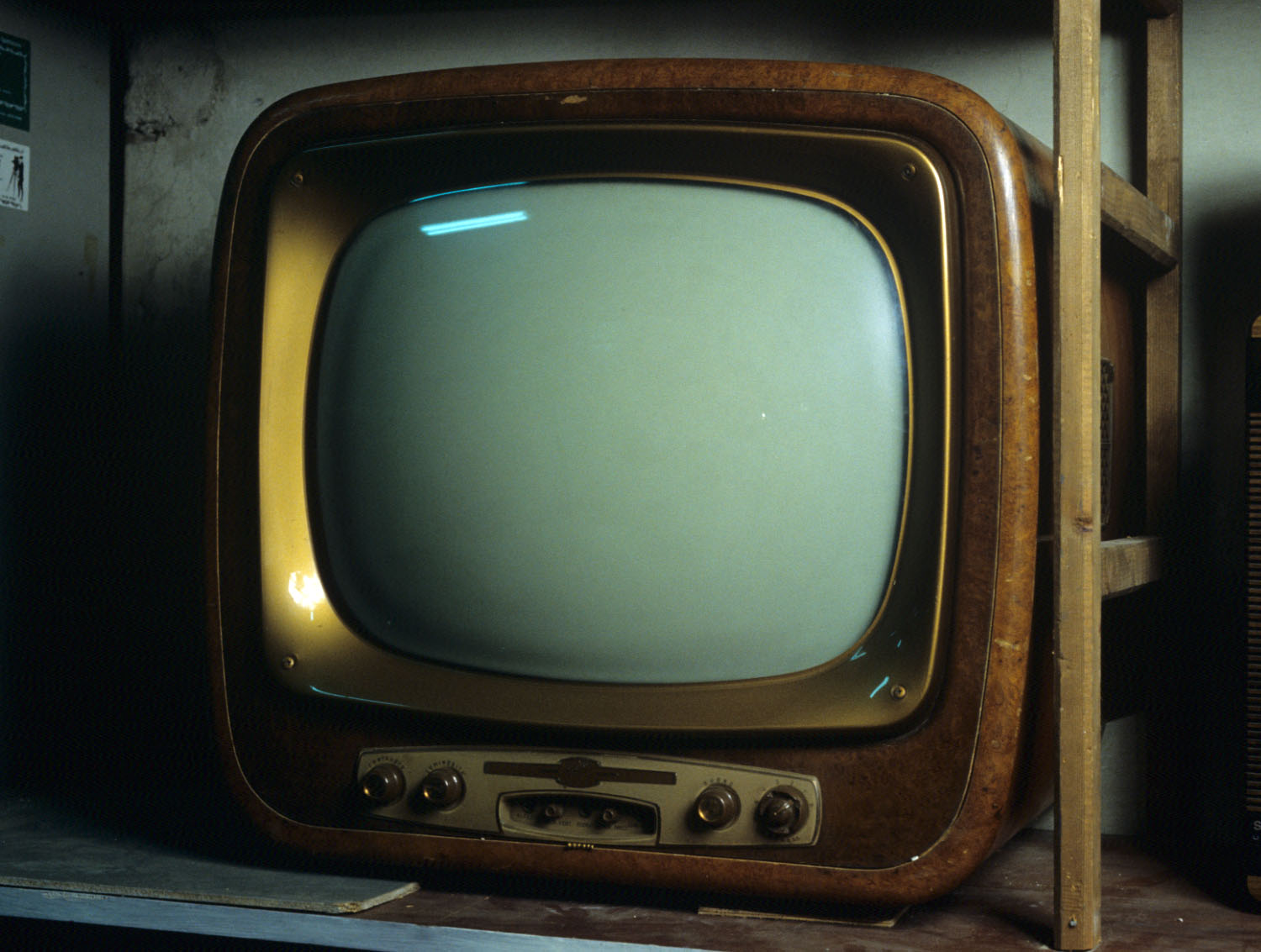
Mobile Geloso television from 1955

In 1931 the company started the production not only of radio sets but also most of the electronic components with which they were built and, over time, also developed and patented many others. After the Second World War, Geloso expanded his range and production, becoming from 1950 a point of reference for enthusiasts of consumer electronics and hobbyists.The many products under the brand name Geloso were known throughout Italy and much appreciated abroad. The output consisted of innovative products known for their high quality, solid construction and reasonable price. The main lines of production consisted of radios, amplifiers, tape recorders, televisions, kits, and professional laboratory instruments. These were complemented by components such as capacitors, resistors, potentiometers, switches, connectors, transformers and microphones.

On the death in 1969 of the founder, Geloso became an empire of eight production plants, with an efficient sales network. Production continued until 1972, when it closed permanently. There were several reasons for this closure: fierce foreign competition, managerial problems, union demands and massive indebtedness to banks.

== Geloso Technical Bulletin ==
Geloso was considered a good businessman, but also someone who wanted to share his passion for electronics. In 1931, he produced a free quarterly publication known as the 'GELOSO Technical Bulletin'. This offered knowledge for the repair and development of its equipment, but also and especially, tips, instructions, characteristics, circuit diagrams and everything that technicians and enthusiasts needed to know. Those were the years when there were no training centres; moreover, schools specialising in electronics were extremely rare. These technical bulletins had the merit of spreading knowledge, in a simple and clear manner, to people who otherwise would not have been able to learn and develop their passion.

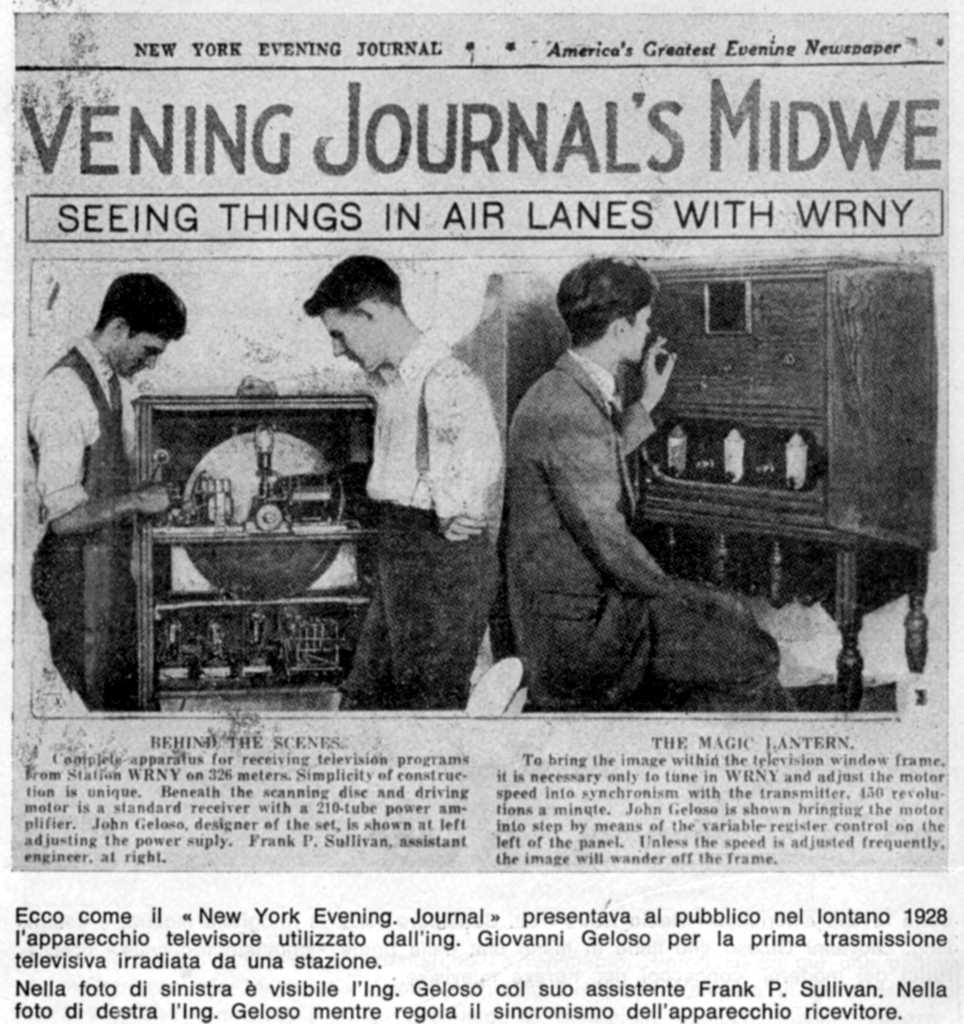
Geloso Technical Bulletin n.108-109 1968/1969. The news reported by the newspapers of the time.

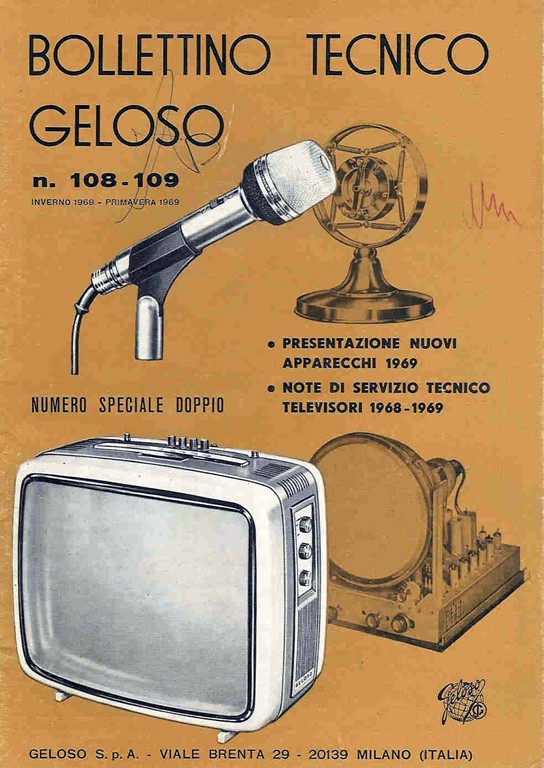
Geloso Technical Bulletin n.108-109 1968/1969

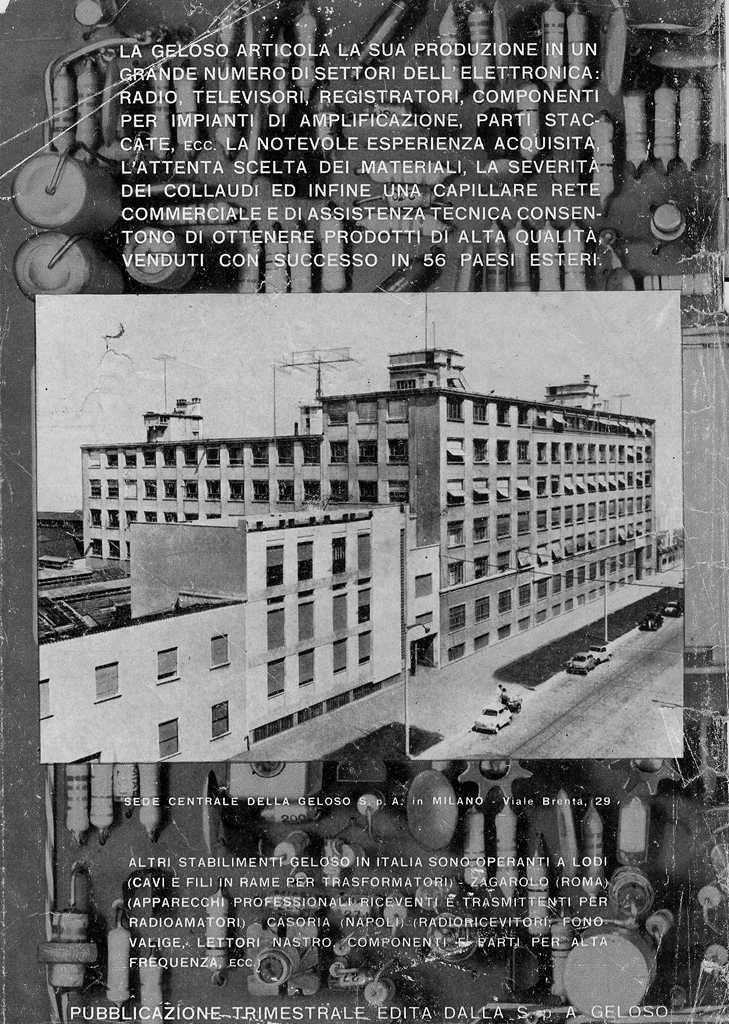
Geloso Technical Bulletin n.108-109 1968/1969

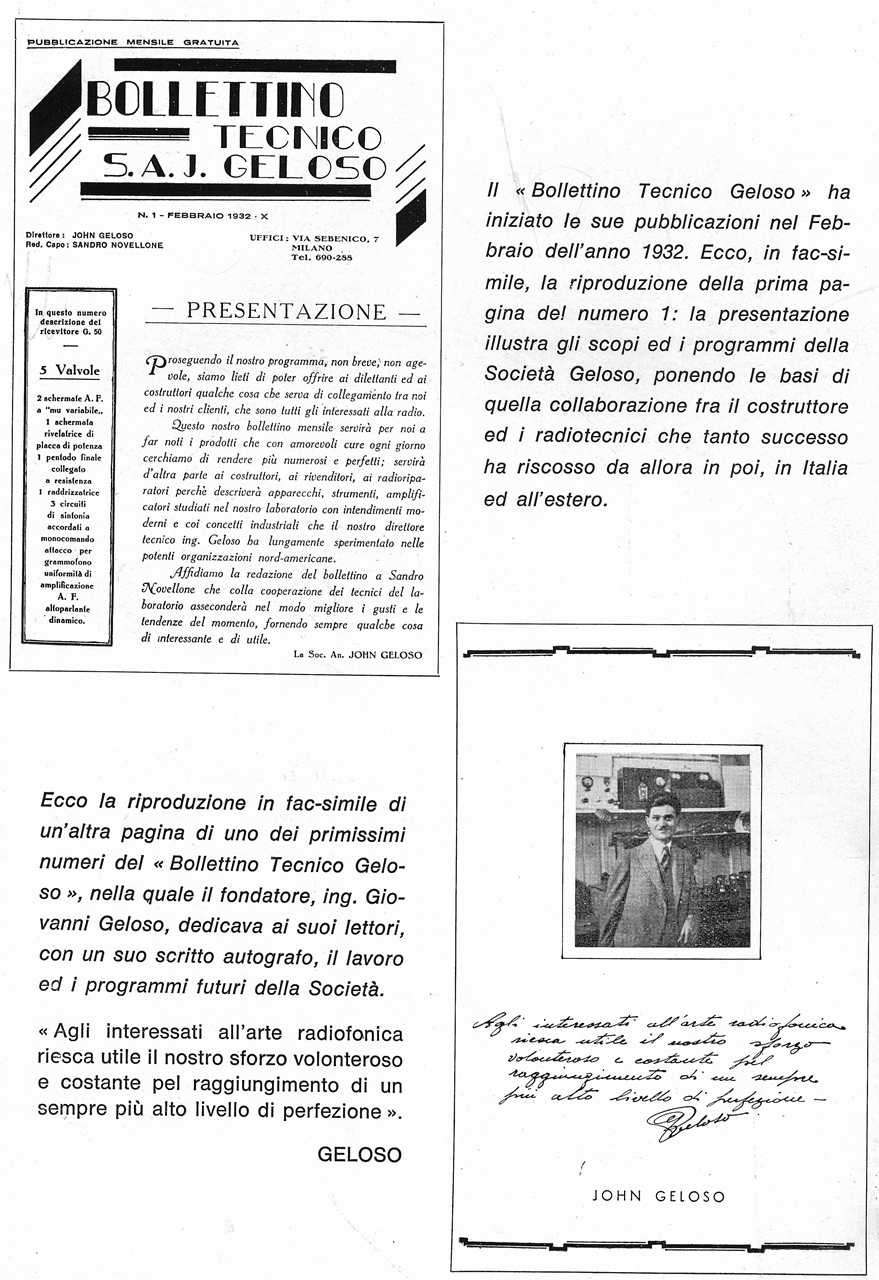
Geloso Technical Bulletin n.108-109 1968/1969 contains a note from J. Geloso and a photocopy of the first technical bulletin of 1932

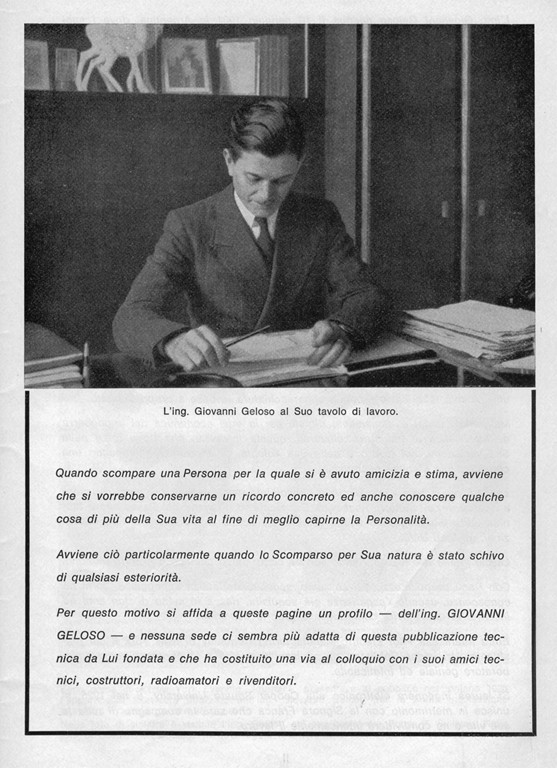
Geloso Technical Bulletin n.108-109 1968/1969: tribute to J. Geloso

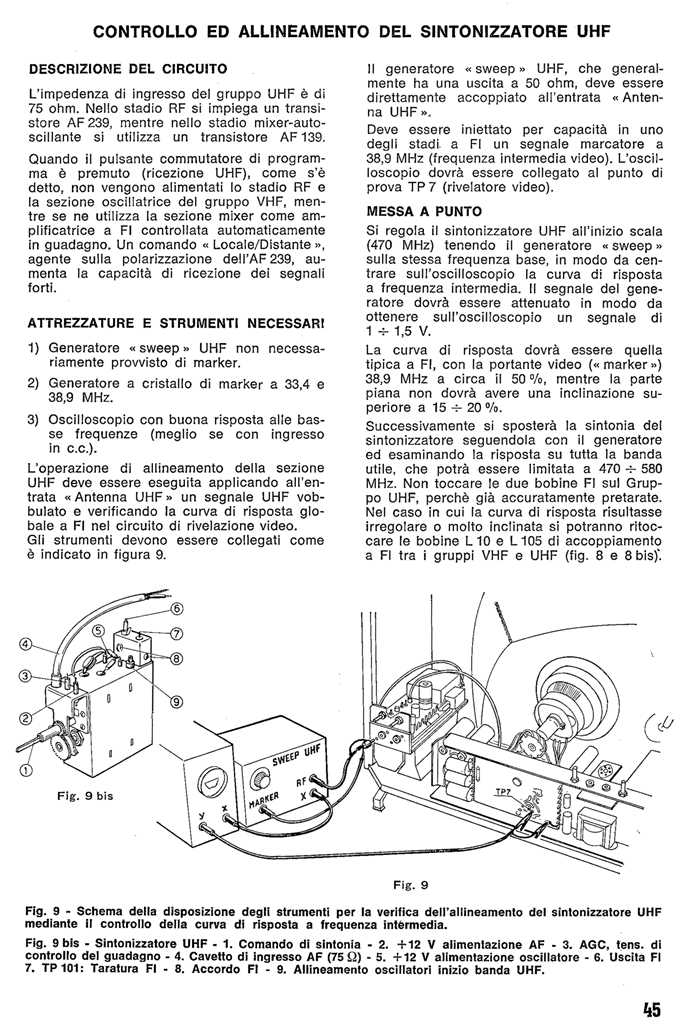
Geloso Technical Bulletin n.108-109 1968/1969: A typical bulletin page

== Assembly kits ==
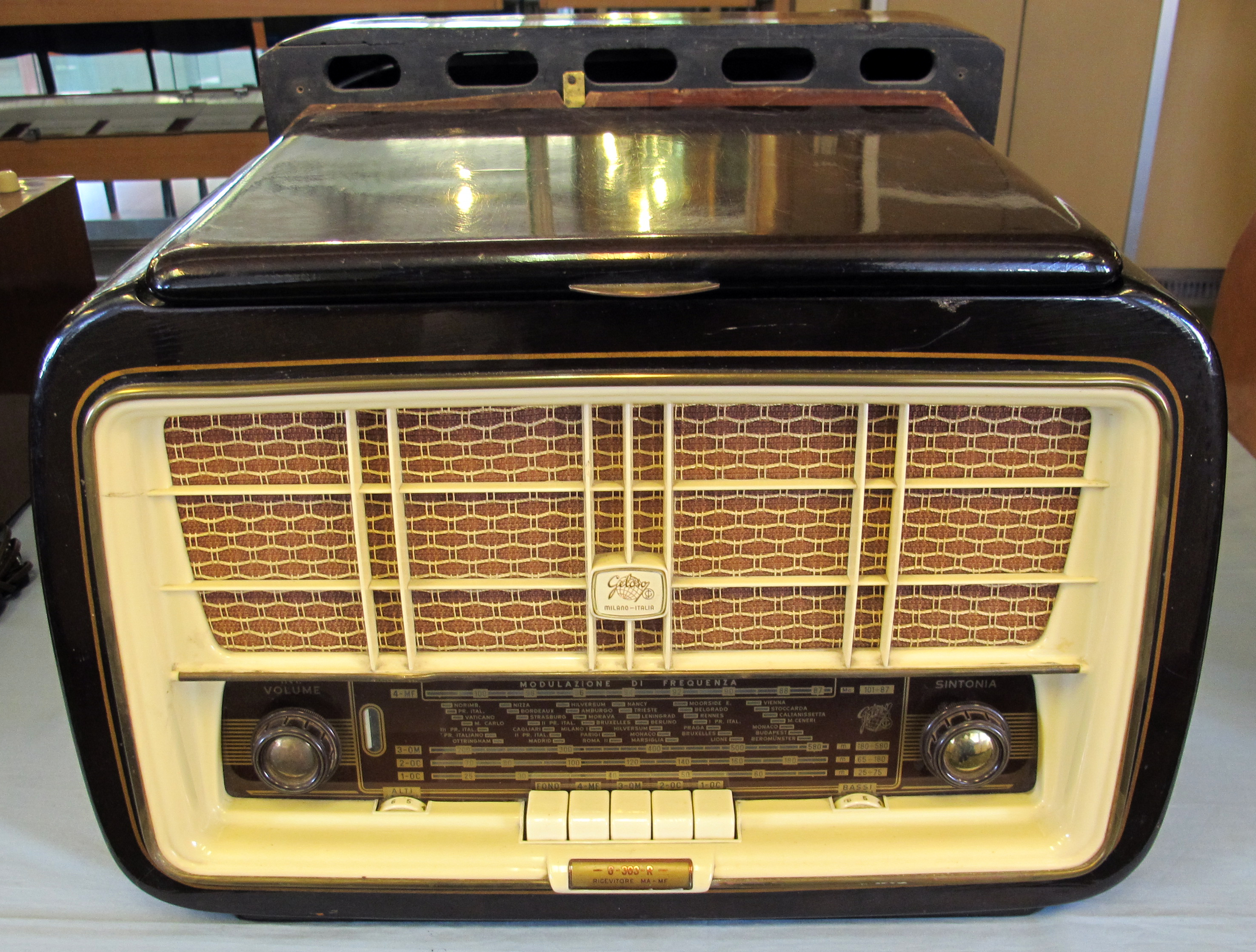
Vintage Geloso radio

Geloso's contribution to the knowledge and popularization of radio technology was considerable, thanks mainly to the assembly kits that enabled the purchaser to build a television or radio receiver, or even radio amateur equipment, almost from scratch.The starting point was the metal chassis onto which the components were fitted. Some pre-assembled and pre-calibrated parts facilitated the work. By following the instructions in the bulletins, the entire set could follow a final calibration, before everything was readied for fitting it into a wooden cabinet with knobs, buttons, etc., all marked Geloso.

Geloso S.p.A. Was a manufacturer of amateur radio equipment between 1931 and 1972. Some of Geloso's most successful products were: radio receivers, tape recorders, audio amplifiers, record players, television sets, radio and TV parts, ham receivers and transmitters.

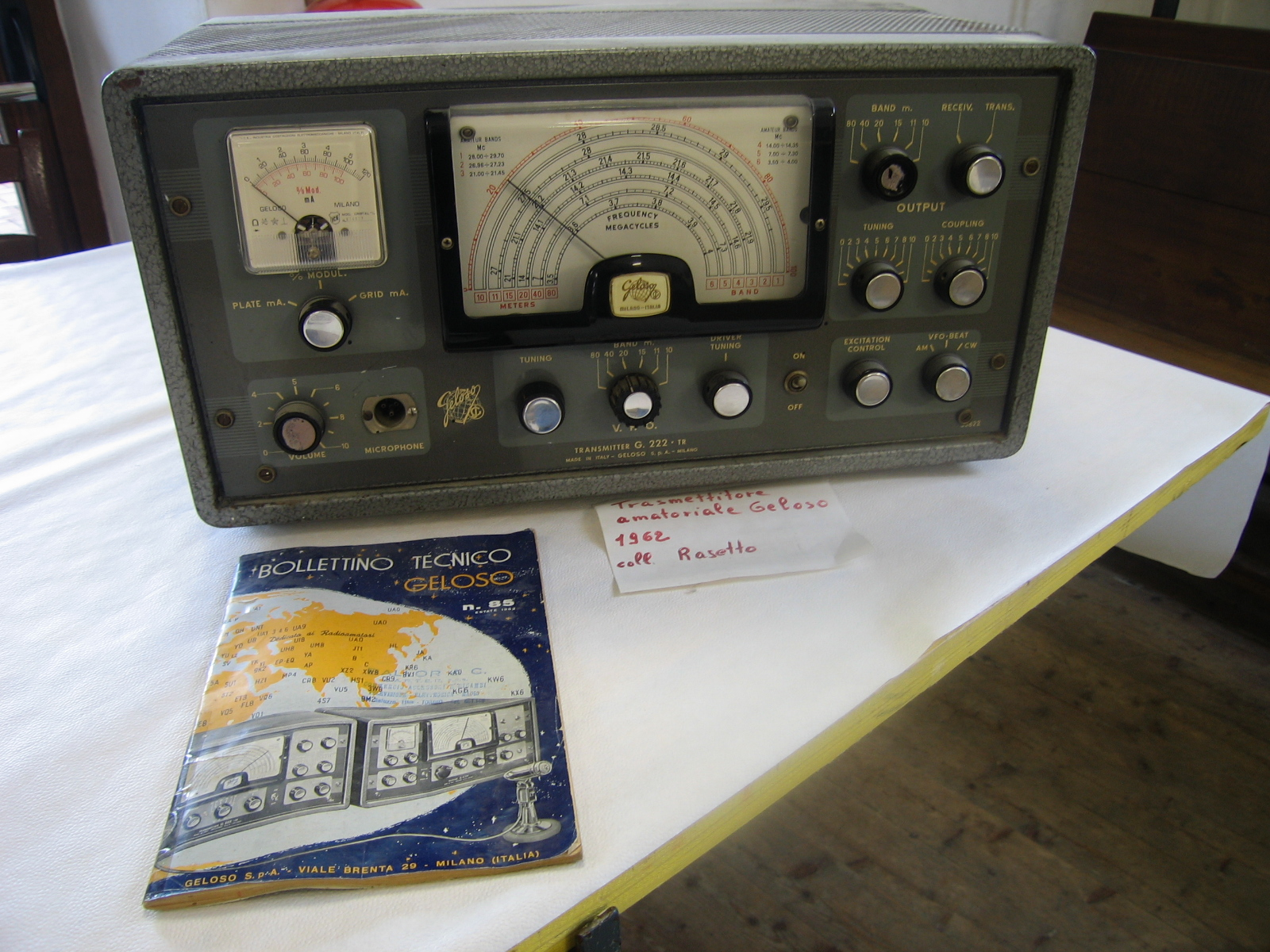
Amateur transmitter (year 1962)

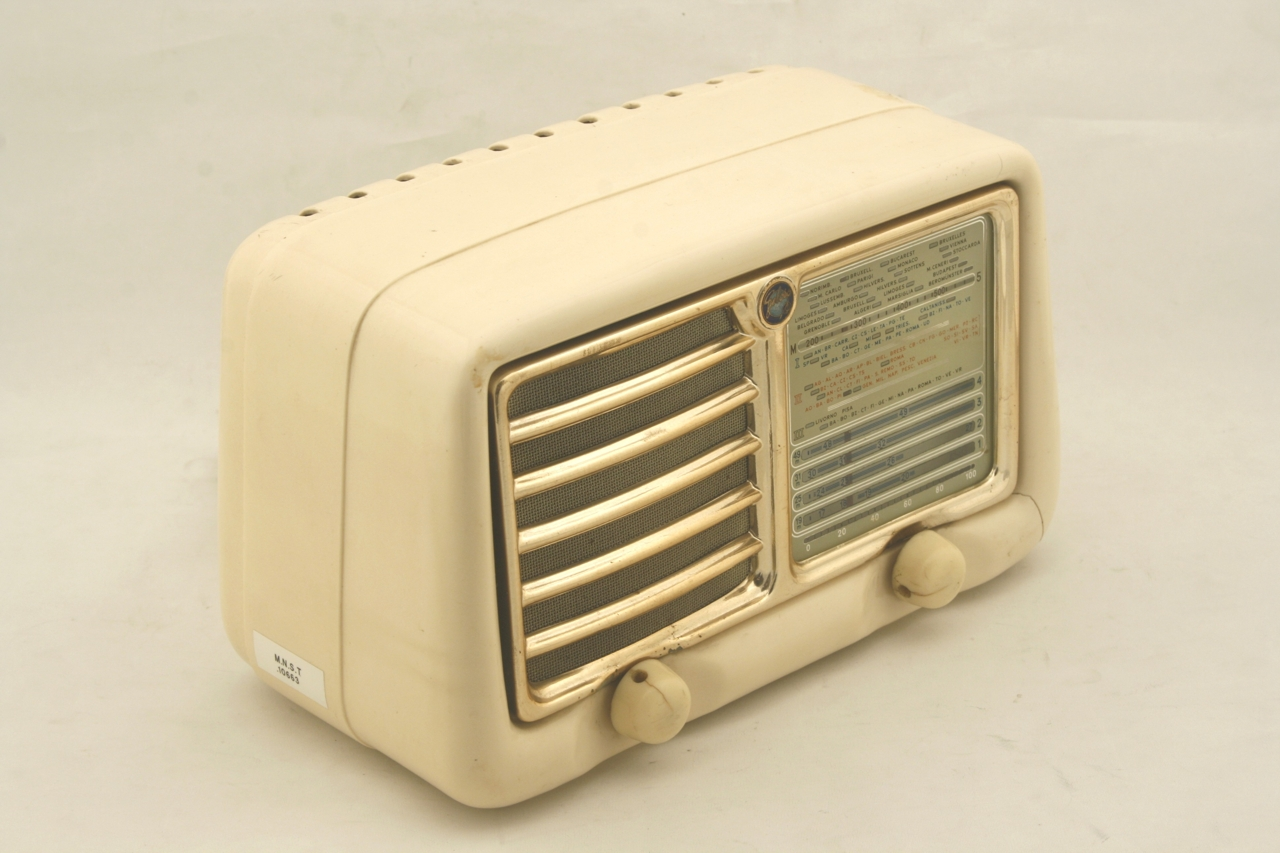
Geloso G 303 B radio receiver ANIE series (year 1956)

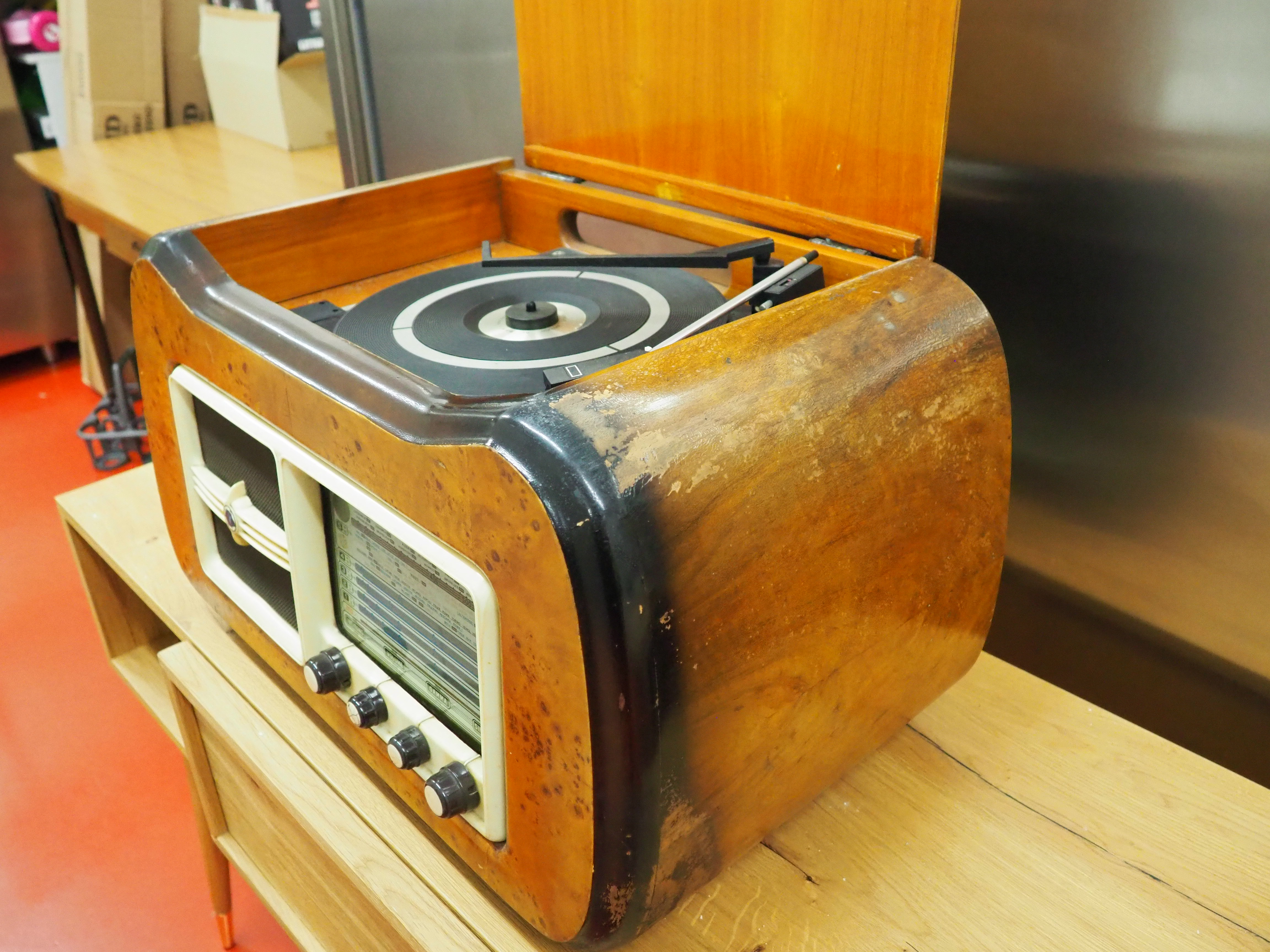
Fonoradio

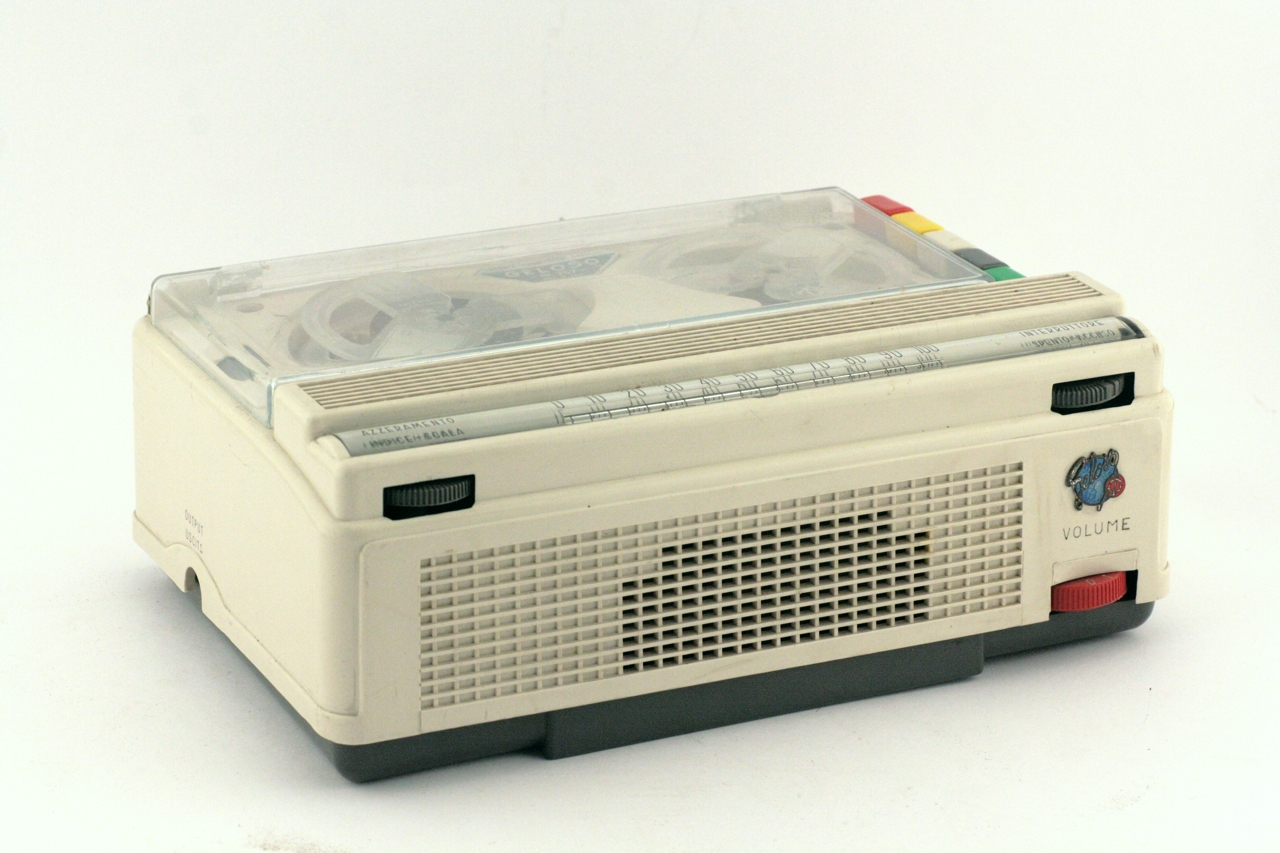
G 257 Geloso valve tape recorder (year 1961)

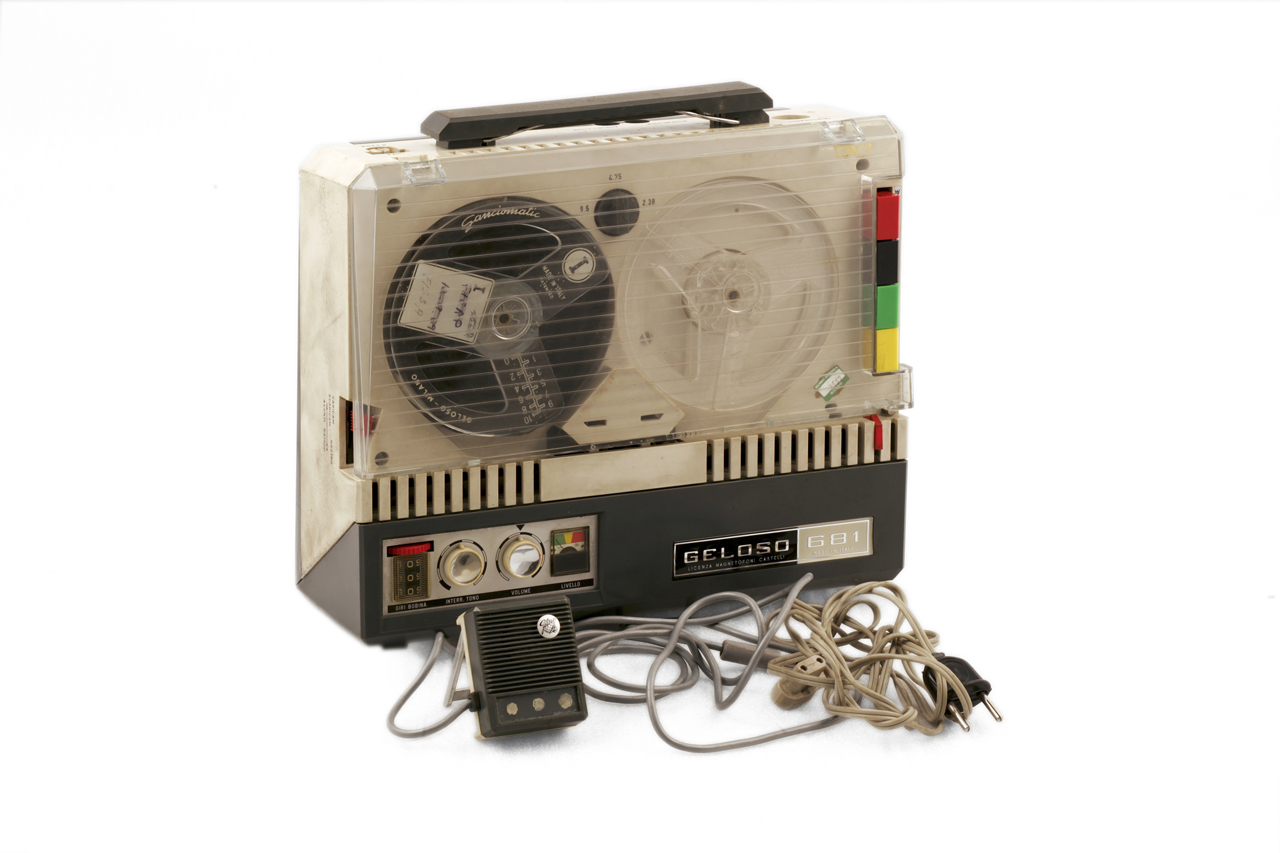
G 681 transistor tape recorder (year 1964)

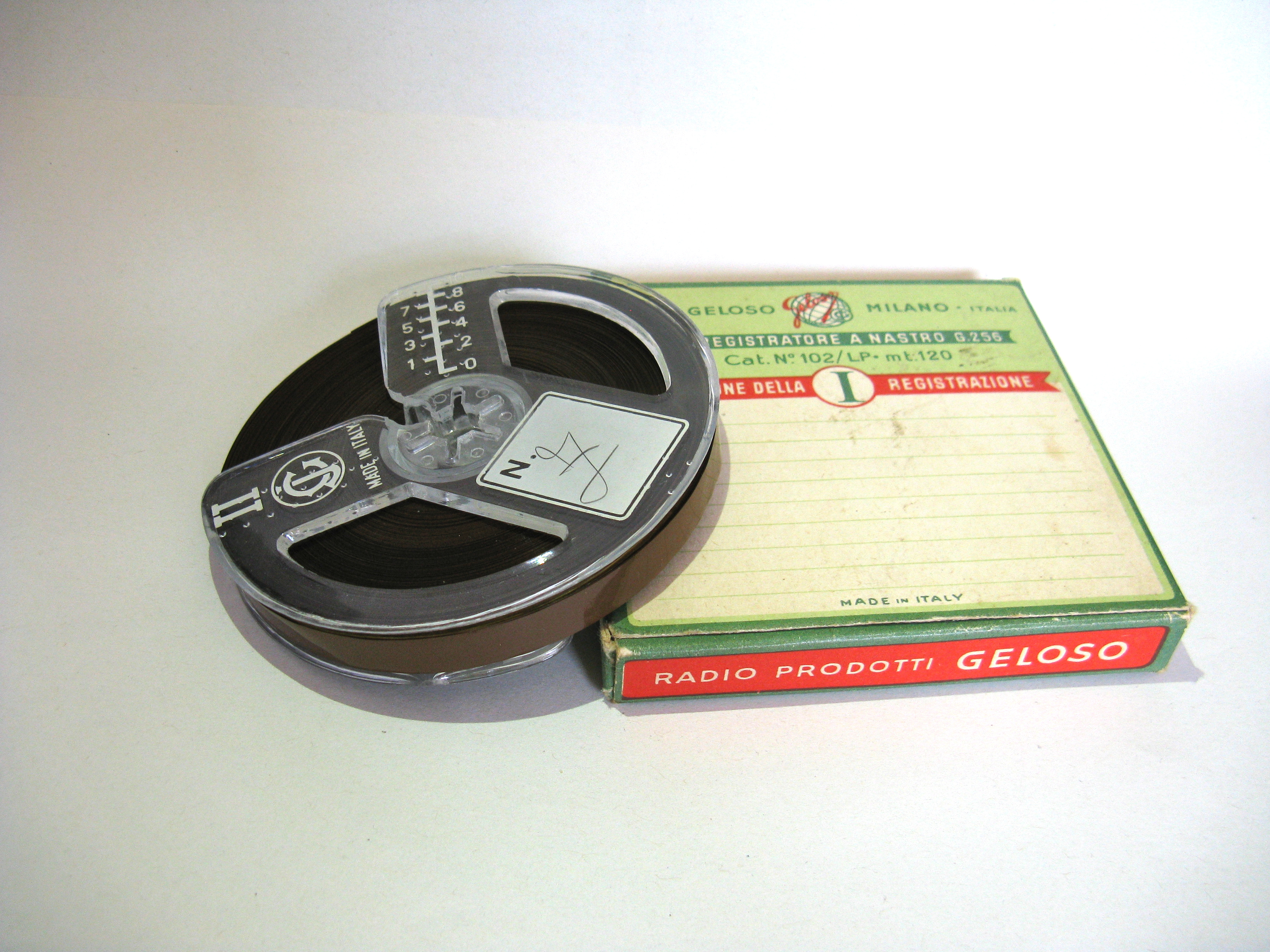
8 cm (3 in) reel of magnetic tape

== See also ==
- List of Italian companies
