= Supersonic Electronics =

American company

- Company type: Private
- Industry: Consumer Electronics
- Founded: 1979; 47 years ago
- Headquarters: Commerce, California, U.S.
- Website: www.supersonicinc.com

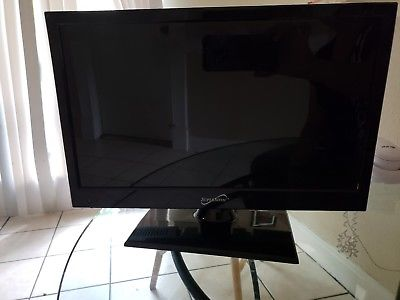
Supersonic LCD TV

Supersonic Electronics is an American brand that specializes in consumer electronics that are primarily sold at pharmacies, big-box stores, and online retailers.

== History ==
Supersonic Electronics was founded in 1979 as a manufacturer of consumer audio and video electronics. Today, Supersonic manufactures portable & LCD televisions, portable & compact DVD players, MP3/MP4 video players, MP3 docking stations & speakers, digital camcorders-still cameras, digital photo frames, portable audio systems and mobile accessories.

In 2012, Supersonic entered the Tablet PC market with the SC-77TV model tablet that runs on Android 4.2.
