= Finlux =

Finnish consumer electronics company

Finlux is a Finnish brand of consumer electronics, established in Lohja, Finland, in 1971, originally part of the Oy Lohja AB industrial group. It has been owned by the Turkish electronics company Vestel since 2006.

== History ==
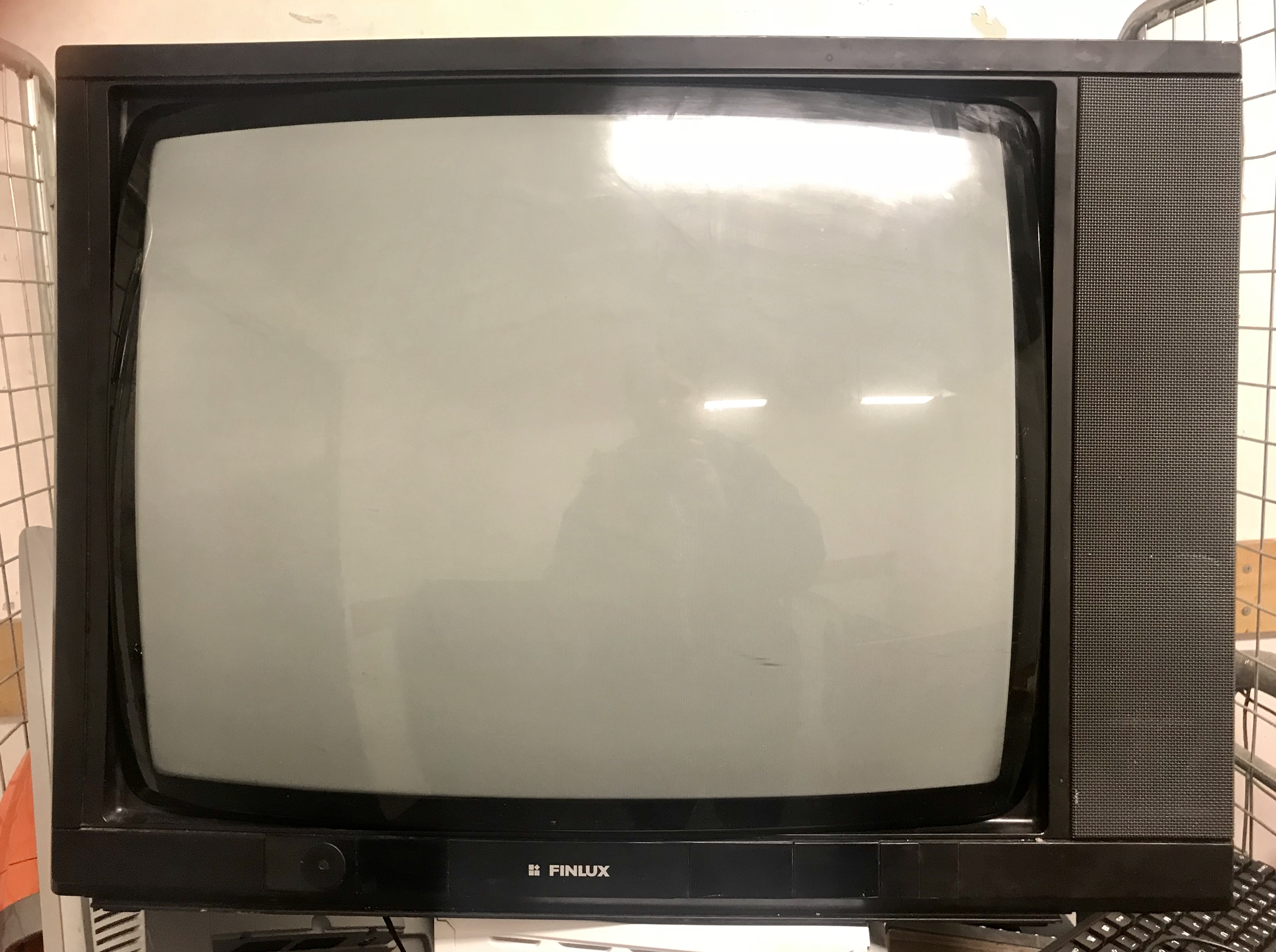
Finlux 3624B, a television

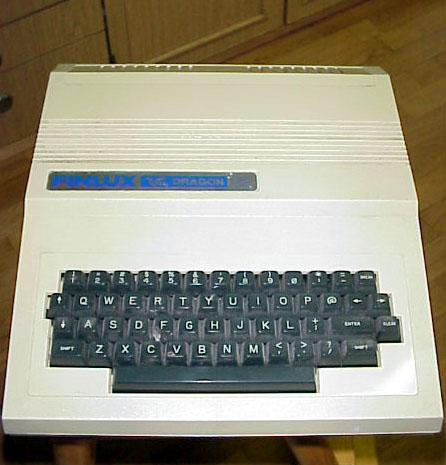
Finlux Dragon

The origins of Finlux were in the Iskumetalli Oy company in Lohja, producer of industrial pumps, that in 1949 started to produce tube radio receivers under license from the Swedish company Luxor and in 1958 the first television receivers. In 1964, Iskumetalli was incorporated in the Lohja industrial group, and in 1971, the Luxor license agreement expired and was officially introduced the Finlux brand, which was a blend word of "Finlandia" and "Luxor"; this was the first time that Finlux had been used as a company name.

In 1972, Finlux unveiled its first colour TV set, called Finlux Peacock, developed by engineer Martti Ahava, which in 1974 was joined by the Colibri model.

In 1977, alongside the consumer electronics division, Lohja started manufacturing Electroluminescence (EL) displays after purchasing the development project, headed by Dr. Tuomo Suntola. The EL displays were manufactured using the atomic layer deposition (ALD) process developed in the project, and were marketed also with the Finlux brand.

In 1978, Finlux introduced the Finlux OBC (Optimum Brightness Contrast) line of colour TVs, developed by engineer Heikki Tupala, which was one of the most successful products of the Finnish company.

In 1979, Lohja acquired another Finnish TV manufacturer, Asa Radio Oy in Turku, which had been manufacturing radio receivers and TV sets since 1927. Since that, all the Finlux TV production moved from Lohja to the former Asa factory in Mälikkälä, Turku. At that time the consumer electronics division of the Lohja group produced annually 170.000 TV sets with the Finlux and ASA brand names.

In 1982, the OBC TV series evolved in the OBC Satellite line, available also with stereo sound and teletext.

In 1984 the OBC Satellite range was replaced with the Design 1000 range with modern "slim-line" cabinets designed by Tapani Hyvönen.

In 1988 was launched the Sky Design TV range with state-of-the-art design and various advanced features, that was awarded by various magazines across Europe.

In 1991, the EL manufacturing was sold to Planar. A new company, Planar International was formed to continue manufacturing EL displays in Espoo, Finland. Planar later consolidated all of its EL manufacturing in Espoo and closed its Oregon EL facility.

In 1992, after the Lohja Corporation bankruptcy, Lohja Consumer Electronics (Lohja Kulutuselektroniikka) and consequently Finlux TV manufacturing was sold to Nokia, which already was manufacturing TV sets with brands Salora, Schaub-Lorenz and Oceanic.

In 1996, Nokia sold all its TV factories and brand names to Hong Kong company Semi-Tech, which continued manufacturing TV sets in one factory in Finland until the year 2000, when the Finnish subsidiary of Semi-Tech filed for bankruptcy.

A new company under the Finlux Oy name, owned by Norwegian company Otrum Electronics, was formed to continue TV manufacturing. However, they had serious troubles with their product line, which was based on CRT TVs. The market had swung to flat-panel TVs and Finlux failed to switch in time. With 50 million euros in debt, the company filed for bankruptcy in September 2005.

In January 2006, the Turkish electronics company Vestel Elektronik, owned by the Zorlu Holding corporate group, bought the Finlux brand. At the time of acquisition, Vestel assembled its television sets in Turkey; the brand just before the acquisition had a significant market share in the United Kingdom and in Benelux countries, as well as in Italy, Spain and Portugal.

== Sponsorship ==
Finlux was the main shirt sponsor for the Swedish team Hammarby 2008–2009.

Finlux sponsored Sheffield Wednesday Football Club from 1986 to 1988, with the unfortunate consequence that the brand name still appears on footage from the Hillsborough disaster.

== See also ==
- Salora Oy
