= Setron (company) =

Singaporean electronics company

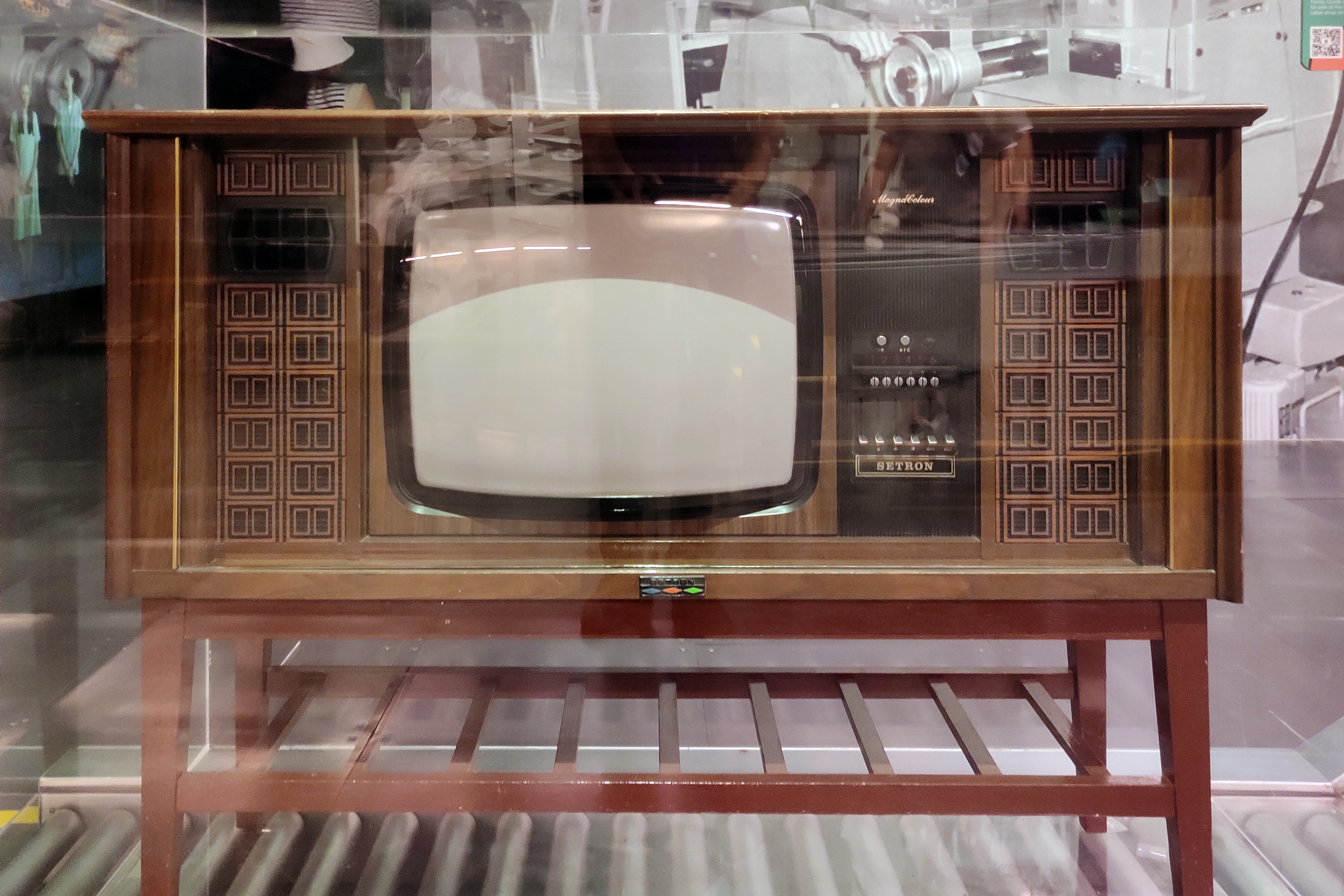
A monochrome television set manufactured by Setron

Setron Limited was a Singaporean electronics company active in the 1960s and 70s, founded in 1965 by Tan Biauw. The company notoriously assembled television sets using European-made components; the company started assembling its first sets in April 1965 from its facility at Leng Kee Road. These sets were available on the local market in December 1965.

== History ==
Setron opened a new facility in April 1966, at a time when one out of six Singaporeans owned a television set.

Beginning in 1969, the company began diversifying its business assets, including the establishment of foreign subsidiaries in Malaysia and Indonesia and agreements with Japanese firms Sanyo for electrical equipment and Toyo for plywood. In May 1974, the company released its first colour sets, also the first to enable UHF reception, timing with the introduction of colour television in Singapore. The company had received 500 orders. In 1977, it introduced cassette recording for radio, a first in Singapore.

On 23 May 1979, Setron received a takeover notice from Haw Par Brothers International Limited.
