= Setchell Carlson =

Former American electronic manufacturer

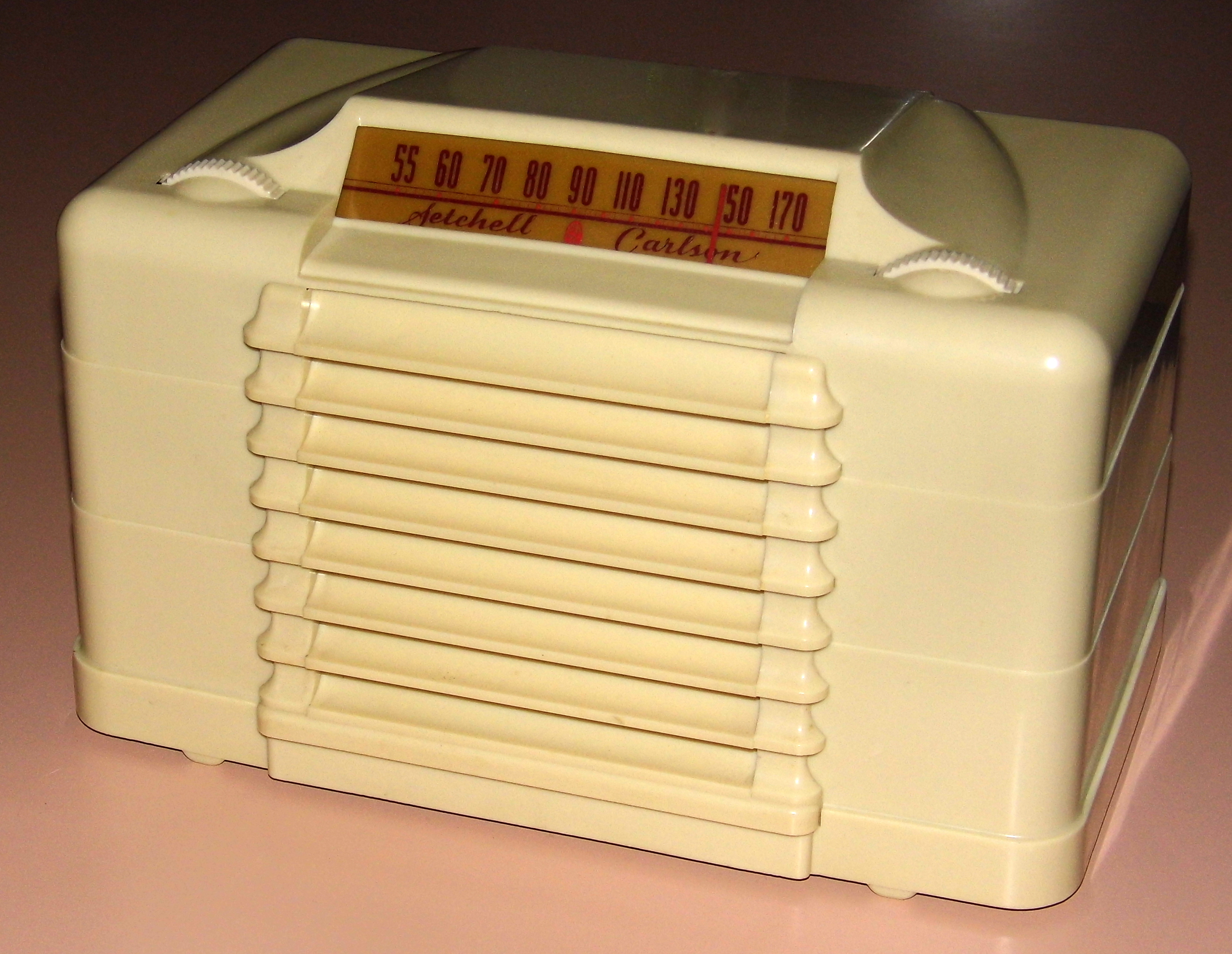
- Setchell Carlson table radio (model 427 circa 1947)
- Formerly: Karadio Corporation
- Company type: Private company
- Industry: Electronics
- Founded: 1928; 97 years ago in St. Paul, Minnesota
- Founders: Bart Setchell and Carl Donald Carlson
- Defunct: c. 1960s-1970s
- Fate: Acquired
- Successor: Audiotronics Corporation
- Headquarters: New Brighton, Minnesota, United States
- Products: Car radios, consumer radios, military radios, electronic equipment, and televisions
- Number of employees: 500 (1960s)

Setchell Carlson was an American manufacturing company of radios, electronic equipment, and televisions from 1928 until the 1960s.

== History ==
The company was founded in St. Paul, Minnesota, in 1928 by Bart Setchell and Carl Donald Carlson under the name "Karadio Corporation", and its first product was a car radio. The company took the name Setchell Carlson in 1934, and produced consumer radios.

During World War II, the company switched to war production, and its most prominent product was the BC-1206-C aviation range receiver.

After the war, the company moved to New Brighton, Minnesota, in 1949, and produced televisions, which continued until the 1960s. In the late 1960s or early 1970s, the company moved away from consumer televisions and focused on equipment for institutions, such as schools. It eventually became a subsidiary of Audiotronics Corporation.

At its peak in the 1960s, the company employed about 500 at two plants in New Brighton and Arden Hills, Minnesota.
