= Westinghouse Electronics =

American manufacturing company

Westinghouse Electronics, LLC
- Formerly: Westinghouse Digital, LLC
- Type: Subsidiary
- Industry: Consumer electronics
- Founded: 2010; 16 years ago, in Orange, California, U.S. (as Westinghouse Digital, LLC)
- Headquarters: Diamond Bar, California, U.S.
- Area served: Nationwide
- Products: Televisions
- Parent: Tsinghua Tongfang
- Website: westinghouseelectronics.com

Westinghouse Electronics, LLC is a Chinese-owned American company that manufactures LCD televisions and other electronics located in Diamond Bar, California.

It is a licensee of the Westinghouse Licensing Corporation, commonly known as Westinghouse Electric Corporation.

== History ==
In 2010, Westinghouse Digital stated on its LinkedIn page that it had ceased operations. The brand was then acquired by Chinese company Tsinghua TongFang, who manufactures products under the Westinghouse Electronics brand.

In 2012, Westinghouse Electronics announced one of the first ultra high definition televisions featuring 4K resolutions.
