= Salora International =

Salora International Limited is an Indian conglomerate and the flagship company of the Jiwarajka Group. Their business spans the complete supply chain, and includes logistics, service, manufacturing and distribution.

The company went public in March 1993.
