= Salora Oy =

Finnish electronics manufacturer

- Type: Osakeyhtiö
- Industry: Electronics
- Founded: 1928
- Founders: F. A. Nordell; Lauri Koskinen
- Defunct: 1989
- Fate: Merged
- Headquarters: Salo, Finland
- Products: Consumer electronics

Salora Oy was a Finnish electronics manufacturer based in Salo. It was established in 1928 and acquired by Nokia in 1989. Its main products were radios, televisions and other home electronics. The brand name is now owned by the Dutch company Salora International BV.

== History ==
=== Founding ===
The company was founded as Nordell & Koskinen in 1928 by F. A. Nordell and Lauri Koskinen. In 1937, the company introduced its first product under the brand name Salora (from a combination of the words Salo and radio), and in 1945, the company changed its name to Salora Oy.

=== Home electronics ===
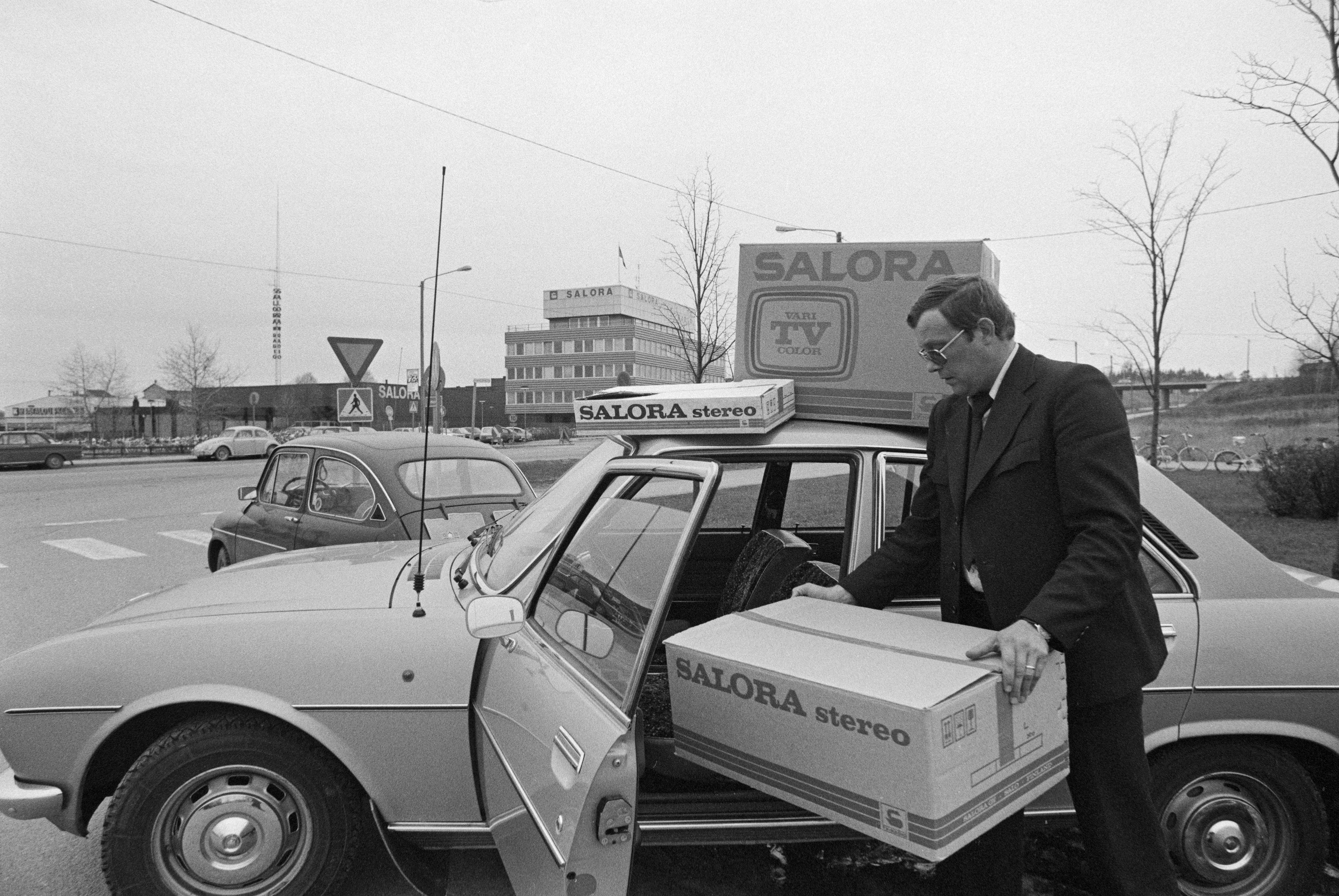
A man packing a Salora television and stereo system in his car, in Salo, Finland, in 1978.

In 1953, Salora released its first FM radios.

In 1957, Salora started to produce B/W televisions, and in 1966 the development of color televisions was established. The first color television model, Salora Finlandia, was released in 1968 and awarded with a gold medal at the Nuremberg International Inventors' fair in 1969. The sales far exceeded the expectations with about 150,000 units sold until 1974. In the early 1970s, around 1,000 televisions of various models were produced per day by around 2,000 employees.

In 1966, Salora entered the export market by selling its televisions to customers in Sweden. By the end of the 1970s, around 60% of the production was destined for export.

In 1967, Salora started to make HIFI systems. The first model was called Salora Metropol 5.

=== Radiotelephones ===
In the early 1960s, Salora started to manufacture radiotelephones for the military, police and emergency services. This was later accompanied by the manufacturing of car phones compatible with the ARP network that was launched in 1971.

=== Co-operation with Nokia ===
In 1979, Salora and Nokia established the joint venture company Mobira Oy (from the words Mobile radio), which produced mobile phones compatible with the then new NMT network. Mobira Oy was then acquired by Nokia in 1982, and the company was later renamed to Nokia-Mobira Oy.

In 1989, Salora was acquired by Nokia and its business was taken over by Nokia-Mobira Oy.

== Products gallery ==
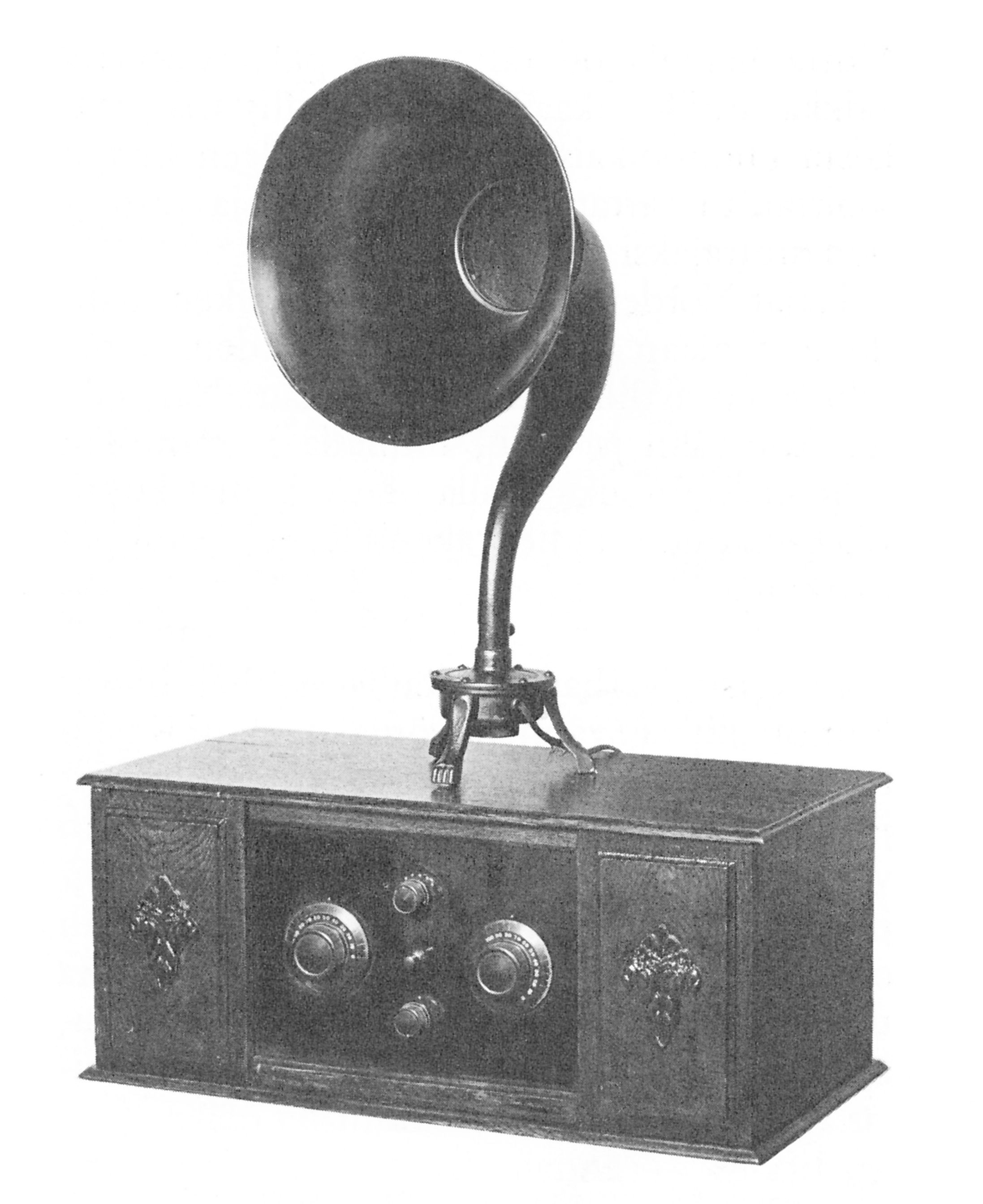
Salora Sissi A3 (tube radio, from 1928)

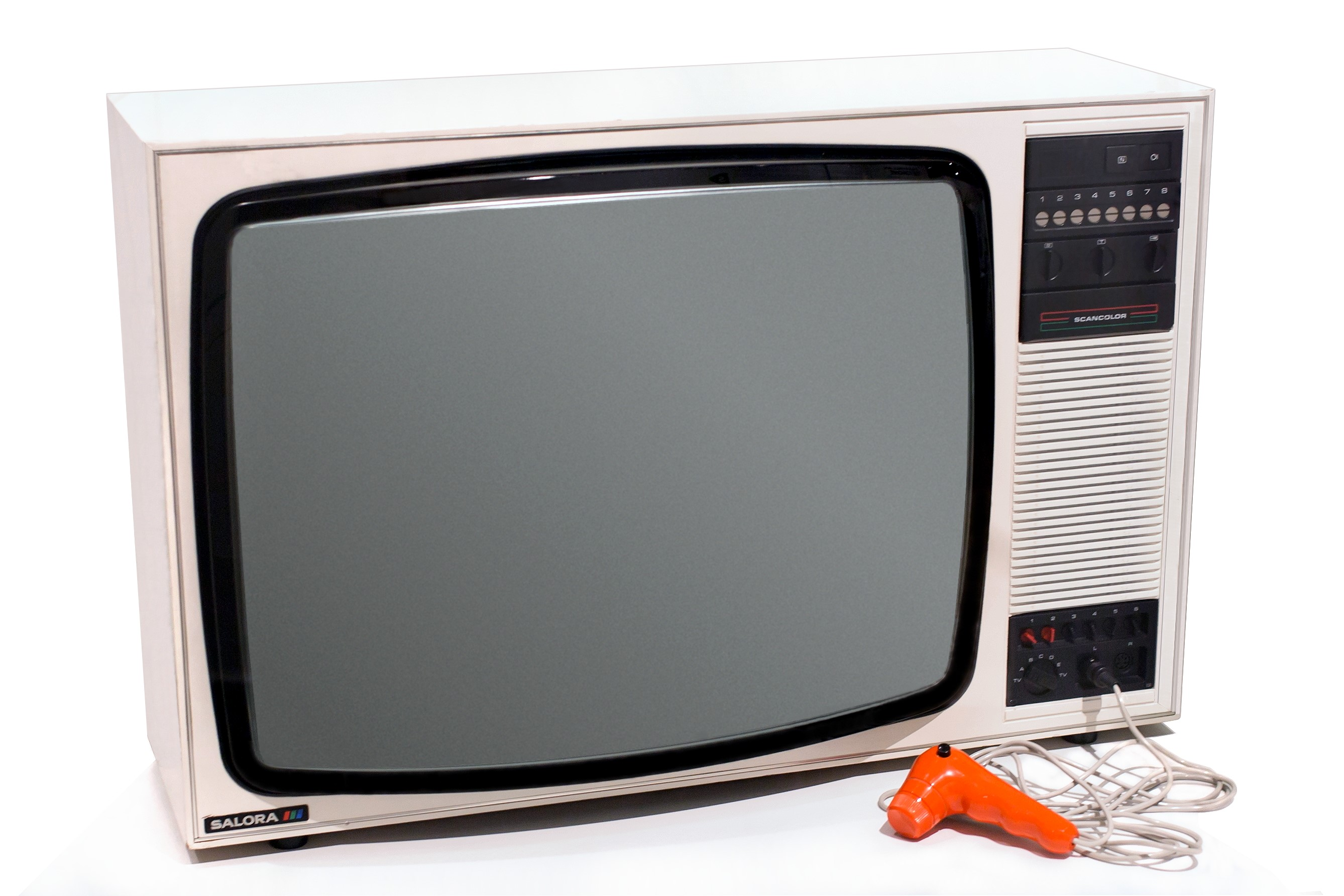
Salora Playmaster (gaming television, from 1977)

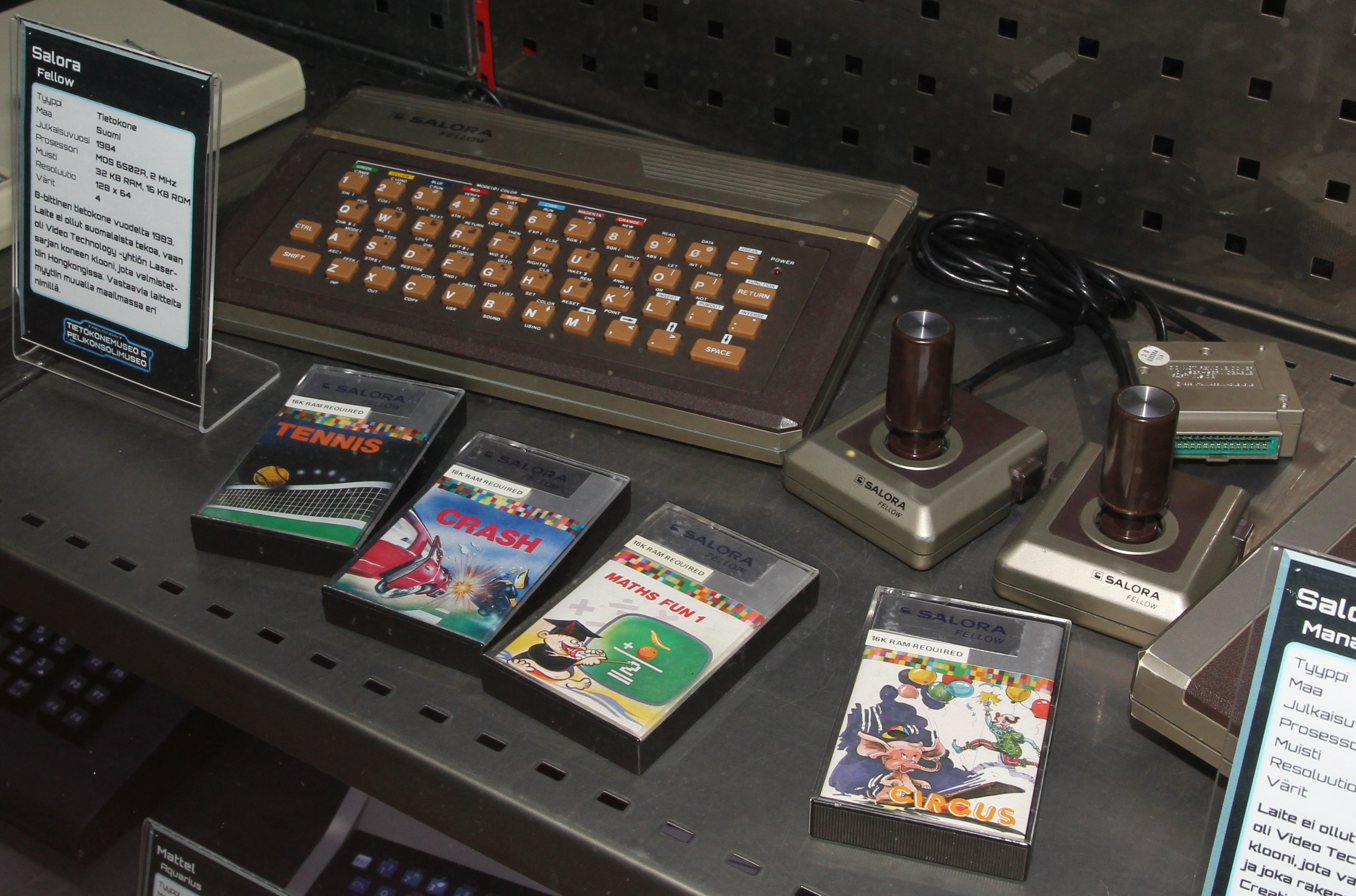
Salora Fellow and Manager were mainly sold in Finland, and it is very rare elsewhere. Similarly, the original VTech Laser machines, which are more popular in other countries, were not sold in Finland.

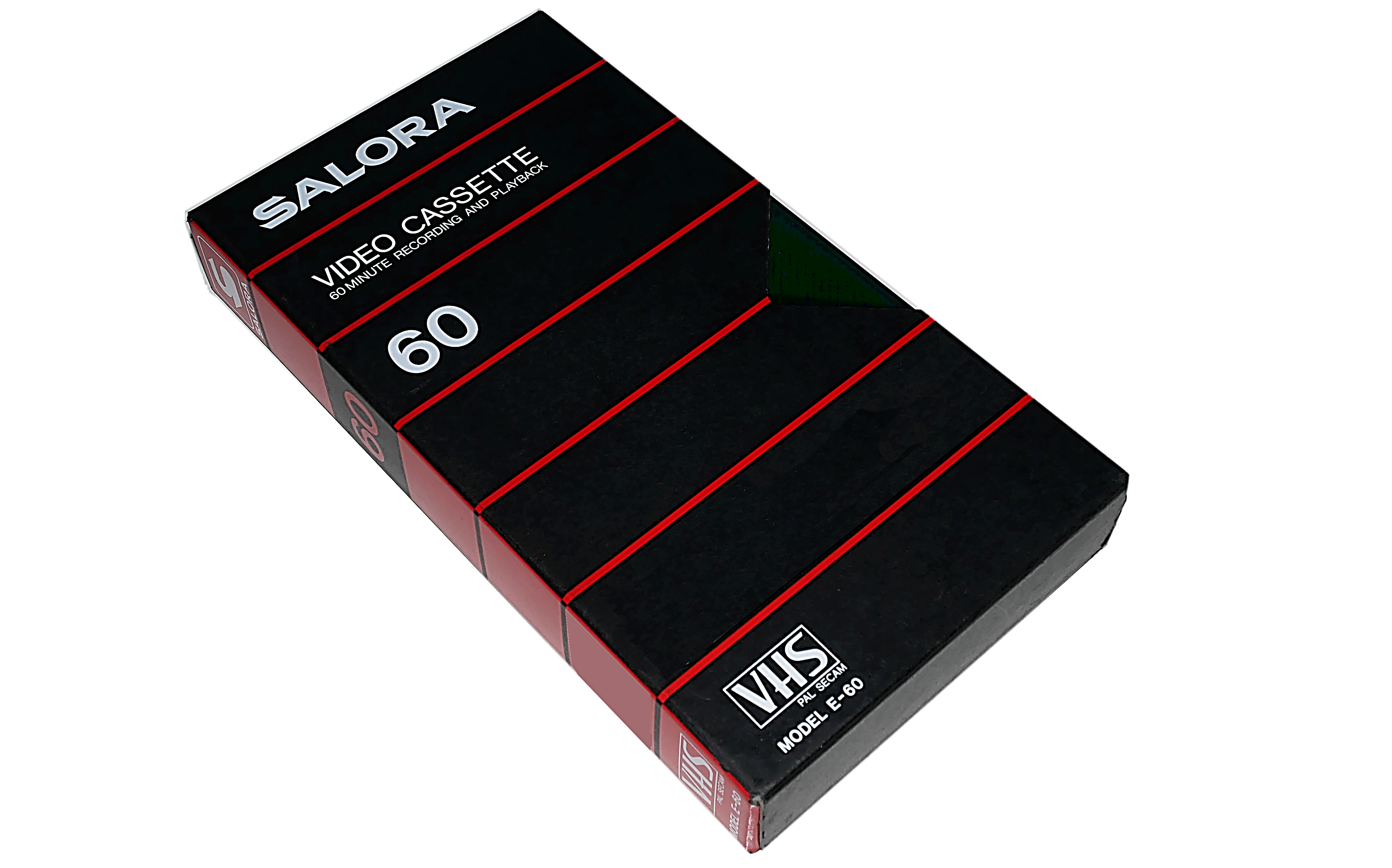
VHS video cassette

== See also ==
- Finlux
