= List of electronics brands =

This list of electronics brands is specialized as the list of brands of companies that provide electronics equipment.

== Categories ==
Electronics equipment includes the following categories (abbreviations used in parentheses):

- audio system (AS) (includes home audio)
- avionics (AV)
- car audio (CA)
- car navigation (CN)
- copy machine (CM)
- computer (CP) (except personal computer (PC))
- digital camera (DC)
- display device (DD)
- digital video camera (DVC)
- digital video player (DVP)
- digital video recorder (DVR)
- fax (FAX)
- global positioning system (GPS)
- hard disk drive (HDD)
- multifunction printer (MFP)
- mechatronics (MN)
- mobile phone (MP)
- list of video game companies (VG/Electronics)
- network device (NW)
- personal computer (PC)
- portable media player (PMP)
- printer (PR)
- semiconductor (SC)
- video cassette recorder (VHS)
- video game (VG)
- video game developer (VGD)
- video game publisher (VGP)
- indie game developer (IGD)
- transportation electronics system (TES)
- television (TV)
- wireless devices (WD)
- other electronics equipment (OEE)

Other indications:

- ( ) – company name
- (( )) – parent company name
- < > – previous company name
- << >> – company name in local language

== Asia ==
=== Bangladesh ===
- BMTF
- Doel
- Jamuna
- Walton
- Rangs
- Transcom

=== China ===
- Aigo (Beijing Huaqi Information Digital Technology Co. Ltd.)
- Amoi
- Anker
- BYD Electronic
- Changhong
- Gionee
- Haier
- Hasee
- Hisense
- Huawei
- Konka Group
- Meizu
- Ningbo Bird
- Oppo
- Panda
- Realme
- Skyworth
- TCL
- TP-Link/intex
- Vivo Electronics
- ZTE
- Xiaomi
- OnePlus

=== Hong Kong ===
- Lenovo

=== India ===
- Amkette
- Beetel
- Bharat Electronics
- BPL
- Celkon
- Electronics Corporation of India
- Godrej
- HCL
- Havells
- IBALL
- Intex
- Karbonn
- Micromax
- Moser Baer
- Notion Ink
- Onida
- Surya Roshni Limited
- Simmtronics
- Sterlite Technologies
- Voltas
- Videocon
- Videotex
- Wipro

=== Indonesia ===
- Advan
- Maspion
- Nexian
- Polytron

=== Iran ===
- Maadiran Group
- Snowa

=== Japan ===
- Allied Telesis – NW, OEE
- Alpine – CA, CN
- Atari
- Brother Industries – CM, CP, FAX, MFP, PR, OEE
- Buffalo (Melco) – HDD, NW, OEE
- Canon – CM, DC, DVC, FAX, MFP, PR, OEE
- Casio – DC, MP, OEE
- Clarion – CA, CN
- Eclipse (Fujitsu Ten) ((Fujitsu)) – CA, CN, OEE
- Eizo (Eizo Nanao Co.) – DD
- Epson – CM, FAX, MFP, PR, OEE
- Fuji Electric – MN, TES, OEE
- Fuji Xerox – CM, MFP, OEE
- Fujifilm – DC
- Fujitsu – CA, CN, CP, MP, NW, PC, SC, OEE
- Funai – DVP, DVR, TV, OEE
- Hitachi – CP, HDD, SC, TV, TES
- Icom – WD
- Iiyama – DD
- JVC (Victor Company of Japan, Ltd) ((JVC Kenwood Holdings)) – AS, CA, CN, DVC, DVP, DVR
- Kenwood ((JVC Kenwood Holdings)) – AS, CA, CN, WD
- Konica Minolta – MFP, OEE
- Kyocera – SC, OEE
- Marantz ((D&M Holdings)) – AS, WD, OEE
- Mitsubishi (Mitsubishi Electric) ((Mitsubishi Group)) – DD, DVP, DPR, TES, OEE
- NEC – CP, MP, NW, PC, SC
- Nikon – DC, DVC
- Nintendo – VG
- Oki – CP, TES
- Olympus – DC, DVC
- Orion (Orion Electric Co.) – DVP, DVR, TV
- Panasonic – CA, CN, DC, DD, DVC, DVP, DVR, FAX, MP, NW, PC, PMP, SC, TV, WD, OEE
- Pentax ((Hoya)) – DC
- Pioneer – CA, CN, WD, OEE
- Renesas – SC
- Ricoh – DC, CP, MFP
- Sansui Electric
- Sega Corporation – VG
- Sharp – DD, DVC, DVP, DVR, FAX, MP, PC, SC, TV
- SII (Seiko Instruments Inc.) – OEE
- SNK Corporation – VG
- Sony – CA, CN, DC, DD, DVC, DVP, DVR, GPS, PC, PMP, SC, TV, VG, WD, OED
- TDK – SC, OEE
- Toshiba – CP, DD, DVC, DVP, DVR, PC, SC, TES, TV, OED
- Victor (Victor Company of Japan, Ltd) ((JVC Kenwood Holdings)) – Same as JVC
- Yaesu

Currently, not providing electronics products

- Akai (repair service)
- Denon ((D&M Holdings)) (repair service)

Defunct

- Aiwa (acquired by Sony)
- Sanyo (merged into Panasonic)
- National (merged into Panasonic)
- Vertex Standard (acquired by Motorola Solutions in 2010s)

=== Korea, South ===
- Cowon
- Daewoo Electronics
- Hansol
- Iriver
- LG
- Pantech
- Samsung
- Hyundai

=== Malaysia ===
- Khind Holdings - OEE
- Ninetology - MP
- Pensonic - OEE
- Silterra Malaysia - SC
- Teras Teknologi - WD, OEE
- ViTrox - OEE

=== Philippines ===
- Cherry Mobile
- Starmobile

=== Pakistan ===
- PEL
- Pakistan Aeronautical Complex
- QMobile
- Dawlance
- Wi-Tribe

=== Singapore ===
- Aftershock
- Creative
- Razer

=== Taiwan ===
- Acer
- AOC (AOC International) ((TPV Technology Limited))
- Aopen
- Asus
- BenQ
- D-Link
- ECS
- Elsa
- EPoX
- Foxconn
- Gigabyte
- HTC
- Lite-On
- MediaTek
- MSI (Micro-Star International)
- Realtek
- Silicon Power
- Soyo
- Surya
- Transcend (Transcend Information)
- TSMC
- VIA Technologies

=== Thailand ===
- Samart
- True

=== Turkey ===
- Arçelik
- ASELSAN
- Beko
- Canovate
- Geliyoo
- Vestel

== Europe ==
=== Croatia ===
- KONČAR Group

=== Finland ===
- Nokia

=== France ===
- Alcatel-Lucent
- Thomson Broadcast

=== Germany ===
- Blaupunkt
- Bosch
- Braun (company)
- Gigaset
- Grundig
- Loewe AG
- Medion
- Metz (company)
- Miele
- Siemens
- Sennheiser
- Severin Elektro
- TechniSat
- Telefunken
- Teufel
- Wortmann

=== Greece ===
- Intracom Holdings
- MLS Innovation (defcunt)

=== Hungary ===
- Orion (Orion Electronics Ltd)
- Videoton

=== Italy ===
- Brionvega
- Brondi
- Cinemeccanica
- Eurotech (company)
- Olivetti S.p.A.
- Radio Marconi

=== Latvia ===
- Luxafor

=== Netherlands ===
- Philips
- Trust

=== Norway ===
- Kongsberg Gruppen
- Nordic Semiconductor

=== Russia ===
- Almaz-Antey
- Angstrem (company)
- General Satellite
- MCST
- NPO “Digital Television Systems”
- Rovercomputers
- Sitronics
- Sozvezdie
- Yota

=== Slovenia ===
- Gorenje

=== Sweden ===
- Electrolux
- Ericsson
- Husqvarna

=== Switzerland ===
- Revox

=== Ukraine ===
- EKTA

=== United Kingdom ===
- Alba
- Amstrad
- BAE Systems
- Binatone
- BT
- Bush
- Dyson
- EMI
- Ferranti
- KEF
- Marconi
- Marshall
- Morphy Richards
- Pace
- Pure
- Pye
- Sinclair Research
- Russell Hobbs
- Texet
- Thorn
- Uniross
- Vax

== North America ==
=== Mexico ===
- Alfa
- Kyoto (Kyoto Electronics)
- Lanix
- Mabe
- Meebox
- Satmex
- Zonda (Zonda Telecom)

=== United States ===
- 3M
- Alienware
- Amazon
- AMD
- Analog Devices
- Apple
- Audiovox
- Avaya
- Averatec
- Bose
- Cisco Systems
- Crucial Technology
- Dell
- eMachines
- Emerson Electric
- Emerson Radio
- Fitbit
- Gateway
- Google
- Hewlett-Packard
- HP
- IBM
- Intel
- JBL
- Kingston
- Koss
- Magnavox
- Micron Technology
- Microsoft
- Motorola Mobility
- Motorola Solutions
- Nvidia
- Packard Bell
- Plantronics
- Polycom
- Qualcomm
- RCA
- Sandisk
- Seagate
- SGI
- Summit Electric Supply
- Sun Microsystems
- Sonos
- Texas Instruments
- Unisonic Products Corporation
- Unisys
- Vizio
- Viewsonic
- Western Digital
- Westinghouse Electric Corporation
- Xerox
- Zenith

== Oceania ==
=== Australia ===
- AG Healing
- ADInstruments
- AWA
- Blackmagic Design
- CEA Technologies
- Codan
- Dynalite
- Fairlight
- PowerLab
- Q-MAC Electronics
- Radio Rentals
- Redarc Electronics
- Røde Microphones
- Telectronics
- Vix Technology
- Winradio

== South America ==
=== Argentina ===
- AeroDreams
- Cicaré
- CITEFA
- FAdeA
- INVAP
- Nostromo

=== Brazil ===
- Avibras
- Embraer
- Gradiente
- Itautec
- Mectron
- Positivo Informatica
- WEG Industries

=== Colombia ===
- Indumil

=== Venezuela ===
- Siragon
- VIT

== See also ==
- Electronics companies by country (category)
- Electronics industry
- List of compact disc player manufacturers
- List of microphone manufacturers
- Market share of personal computer vendors
