= M4Tel =

Mexican modem and phone manufacturer

- Company type: private company
- Founded: 2012; 14 years ago
- Headquarters: Mexico City, Mexico
- Area served: Latin America
- Key people: Javier de Atuñano (CEO)
- Products: Smartphones; Modems
- Website: m4tel.com

M4Tel (formerly: MFOURTEL MÉXICO, SA DE CV) was a Mexican smartphone company founded in 2012 in Mexico City and produced its Smartphones and Modems in China. It had a presence in 8 Latin American countries.

== History ==
In April 2012, M4Tel was founded with the objective of being the first mexican firm to develop and sell smartphones.

In 2017, M4 shifted its business from smartphones to focus on new devices for wireless internet and the Internet of Things. M4 entered the electronics market with the M4 MiFi Freedom, a portable modem of versatile size capable of connecting up to 10 users simultaneously.

In 2018, M4 and MediaTek presented the new B2 and B3 smartphones, intended to compete with big brands in the mid-range market in Mexico.

The company ceased to exist between 2020 and 2021, given its inactivity on all the company's official social media accounts.

== See also ==
- Lanix
- Zonda Telecom
