= French Gerleman =

Electrical Company

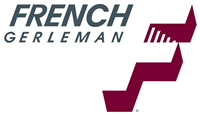
- Type: Private
- Founded: 1923
- Headquarters: St. Louis, MO, United States
- Number of locations: 6 branches (2019)
- Products: Industrial Supply Distribution
- Number of employees: 201-500 Employees
- Divisions: Automation, Electrical Supply, Datacom, Power Transmission, Safety, Clean Energy
- Website: www.frenchgerleman.com

French Gerleman is a regional supplier of electrical, automation, datacom, power transmission and safety products and services. Founded in St. Louis, Missouri in 1923, the company is currently headquartered in St. Louis, Missouri. It is a member of the National Association of Electrical Distributors.

== History ==
In 1923, Albert O. French and Charles C. French, brothers who initially were partners with J.F. Gerleman, started French Gerleman in St. Louis, Missouri. The 1930s brought French Gerleman into an agency relationship with the Allen-Bradley Company (now Rockwell Automation). The result was French Gerleman's gradual expansion into the industrial controls market.

In 1976, French Gerleman moved from St. Louis to Maryland Heights, MO. Twelve years later in 1988, French Gerleman opened their first two locations in Quincy, IL and Columbia, MO. As growth continued, they opened another branch in Lenexa, KS and expanded their St. Louis headquarters. In 2000, French Gerleman opened another branch in Washington, MO. Most recently in 2017, another location was opened in Springfield, MO.

== Locations ==
- St. Louis, Missouri
- Columbia, Missouri
- Quincy, Illinois
- Lenexa, Kansas
- Washington, Missouri
- Springfield, Missouri

== Philanthropy ==
French Gerleman host an annual event with Rebuilding Together, an American non-profit organization with the goal of preserving affordable homeownership and revitalizing neighborhoods through free home repairs and modifications for neighbors in need. French Gerleman host a Rebuilding Day, a single day where volunteers come together to help low-income homeowners in the St. Louis area to improve the safety and comfort of their home. Rebuilding Day 2019 consisted of the French Gerleman team partnering with a family from Maryland Heights, Missouri. Similar to previous years, the family's home was in need of many updates to improve safety and general quality of life. The team was able to help the owner, who suffered from multiple sclerosis, with a variety of projects that will benefit the family moving forward.

The French Gerleman branch in Quincy, IL teamed up with RAB Lighting to light up the different monuments and memorials for veterans. French Gerleman donated LED fixtures, a mix of incandescent, HID and fluorescent lights to help bring light to different building and monuments including the WWII Memorial, the Korean War Memorial and the Vietnam War Memorial, on the Veterans Home in Quincy, IL.

== Awards and honors ==
=== Workplace ===
In 2016, French Gerleman was named a winner in the St. Louis Business Journal's inaugural Family Business Awards, selected for its longevity, entrepreneurship, perseverance, creativity and community involvement.

Recognition as one of the 200 largest distributors of electrical supplies

- #68 on Electrical Wholesaling Magazine's 2019 list of the 200 largest distributors of electrical supplies
- #74 on Electrical Wholesaling Magazine's 2017 list of the 200 largest distributors of electrical supplies

Recognition as a top privately held company

- #138 on St. Louis Business Journal's 2018 Top 150 Privately Held Companies
- #127 on St. Louis Business Journal's 2017 Top 150 Privately Held Companies

=== Industry ===
In 2001, Southern Illinois University Edwardsville's School of Business recognized French Gerleman for its excellence in industry and positive impact on the community with the 2001 Mississippi Valley Family Business of the Year Award. In addition, French Gerleman placed first runner-up in the 2001 National Family Business of the Year Award sponsored by MassMutual Financial Group.

=== Environment ===
In August 2013, French Gerleman attained the Platinum Trade Ally Status from Ameren Missouri's ActOnEnergy BizSavers program. Missouri's ActOn BizSavers program offers rewards to companies that help cut energy costs and usages. French Gerleman attained Platinum status, the highest honor, by saving over five million kilowatt-hours (kWh) saved and completing over 50 projects.
