= Iran robotics team =

Iran Robotics Team
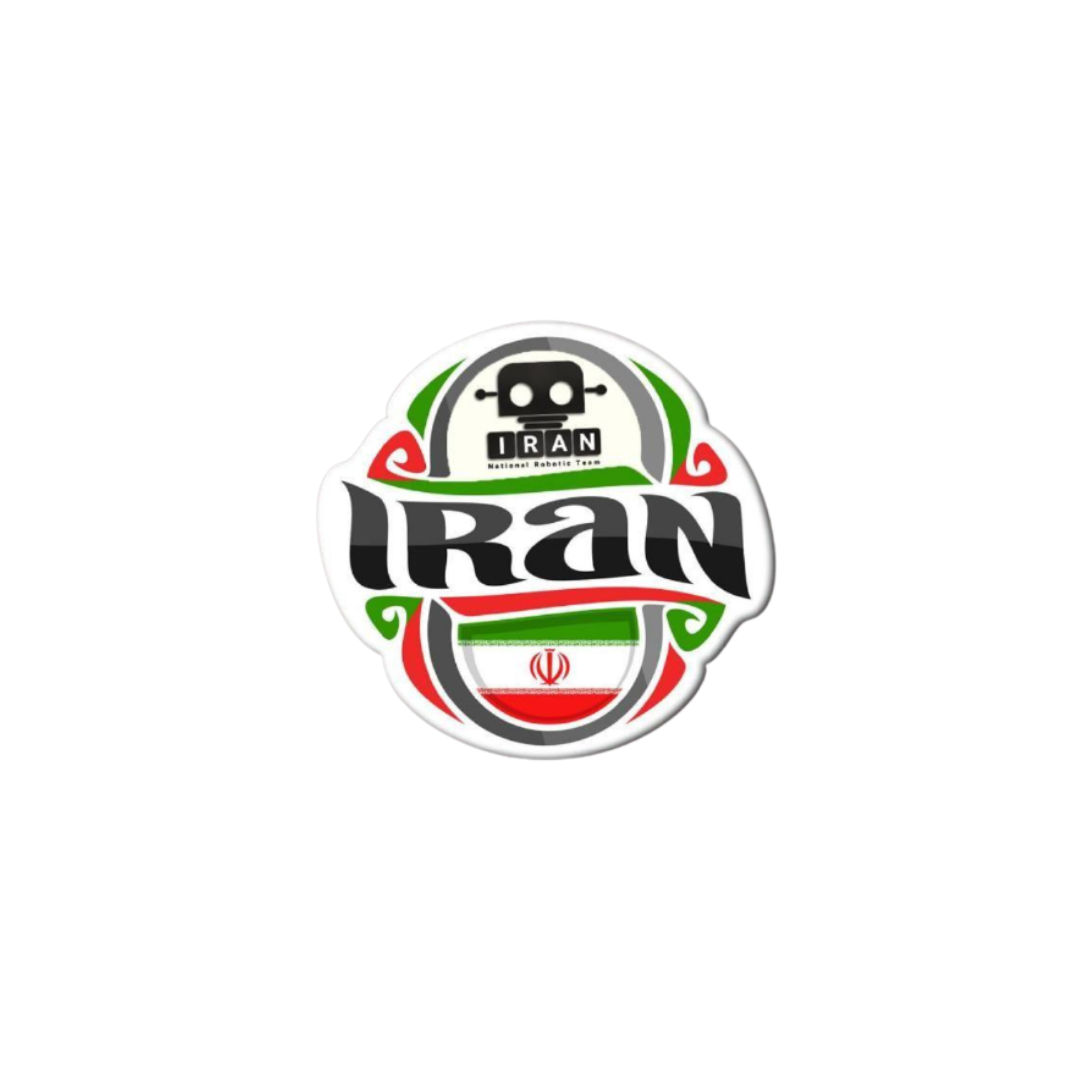
- Iran Robotics Team logo
- Nickname: Iran FGC Team
- Short name: Team Iran
- Founded: 2013
- First season: 2017
- Manager: Mohammadreza Karami
- Club titles: Silver medal, Engineering Design, 2022 Silver medal, Engineering Documentation, 2024 Silver medal, Grand Challenge, 2021 Bronze medal, Global Innovator Award, 2024 Outstanding Mentor Award, 2020 Story Telling Award, 2024 Judges Award, 2023 Social Media Award, 2020 – 2024 Safety Award, 2019 – 2022 Top ten, XPRIZE Innovator Award, 2022

The Iran Robotics Team (also known as Iran FGC Team or simply Team Iran) represents Iran in the FIRST Global Challenge, a yearly Olympics-style robotics competition organized by the International First Committee Association (IFCA), among more than 190 countries, since 2017.

== History ==
=== Before FIRST Global Challenge ===
Founded in 2013, Team Iran started its official activity entering the World Robotics Olympiad (WRO) as a representative of Iran. During 2016's edition of the WRO, IFCA invited the team to compete in the FIRST Global Challenge.

=== In the FIRST Global Challenge ===
==== First three seasons: A start ====
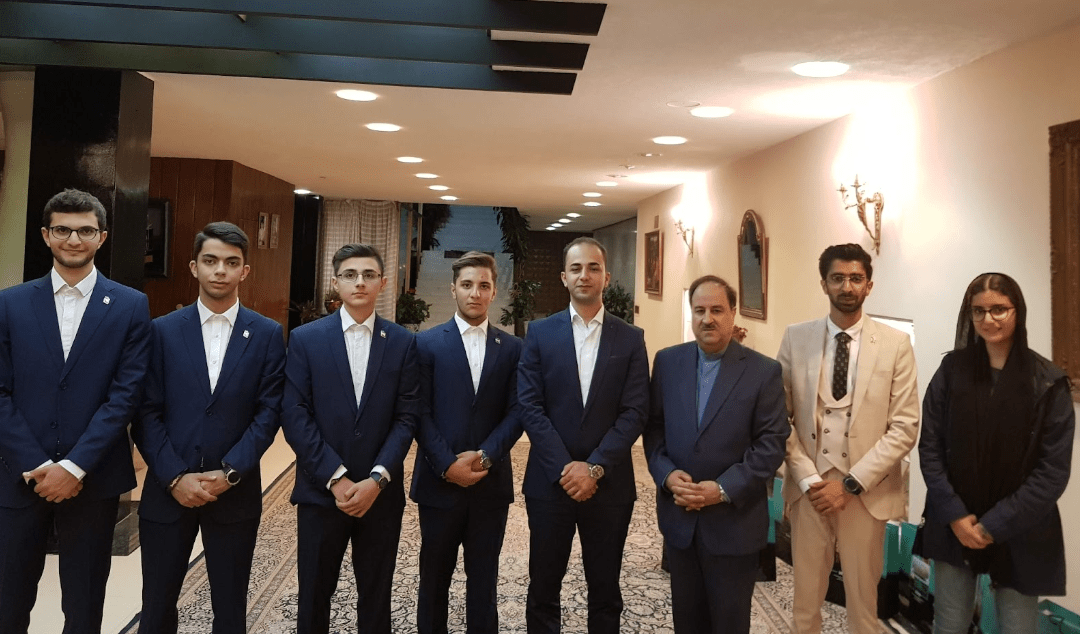
Team Iran in 2018 FIRST global challenge

Since 2017, Team Iran has participated in the FIRST Global Challenge the national team of Iran under the management of Mohammadreza Karami. The team has also competed in the Mexico City 2018 and Dubai 2019 competitions, subsequently.

==== 2020–2021 seasons: Rise in the pandemic ====
Due to the COVID-19 pandemic, the fourth and fifth seasons of the FIRST Global Challenge were held online in 2020 and 2021.

In 2020, the fourth edition of this challenge, Team Iran participated with 35 students and made it to the top 20 teams with two futuristic projects: An intelligent system for managing and saving water consumption, and a device for disinfecting clothes and equipment. The team also achieved the "Outstanding Mentor Award" along with 8 other countries.

In 2021, Team Iran, won second place in the Environment branch of "the Grand Challenge" by presenting the Smart "Trash Cycler" for compost production.

==== 2022–present: A decorated team looking for more ====
After the success in the virtual competitions of 2020 and 2021, Team Iran started the sixth consecutive year with high hopes for achieving more victories. A team comprising 22 students, two coaches, and six coach assistants from different regions of the country started developing ideas for the 2022's challenge with the slogan "More than a Robotics Team."

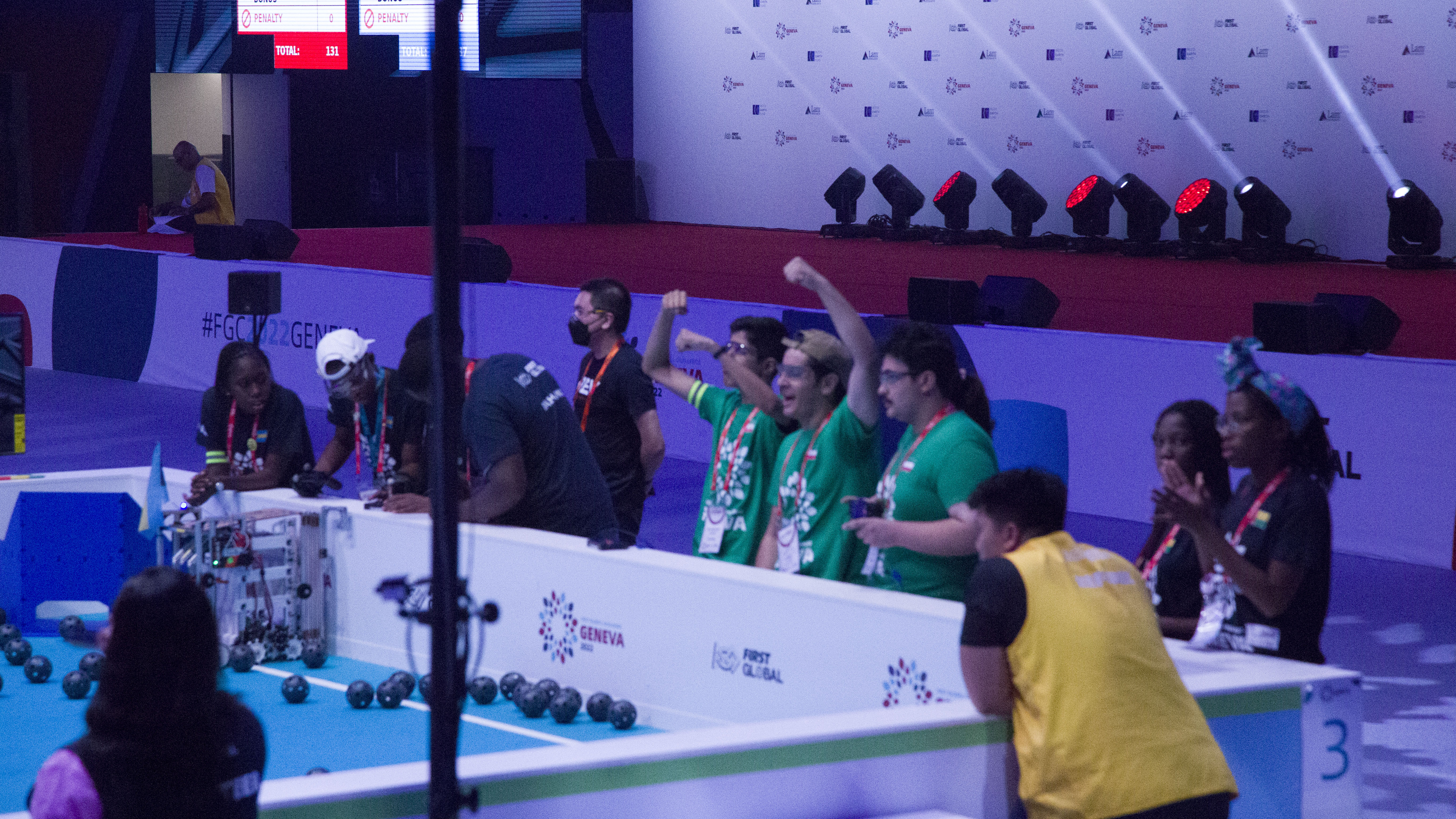
Team Iran in 2022 FIRST Global Challenge

The Geneva 2022 edition was a success for the team in its journey with four awards that season, including a prestigious silver medal in "Engineering Design".

2024: Accolades after trials and errors

By 2024, Team Iran had become one of the most experienced participants in the FIRST Global Challenge. Supported by Snowa Tech and several domestic partners such as the Innovation Factory, the team traveled to Athens, Greece, to compete in the 2024 edition of the challenge. In October 2024, Team Iran once again proved itself as one of the strong contenders in the competition.

The team's remarkable performance included standing on the podium for two prestigious awards: a silver medal in Engineering Documentation and a bronze medal in Innovation and Research.

2025: Panama and a united team

In the 2025 FIRST Global Challenge, held in Panama under the main theme of Environmental Balance, Team Iran is participating across all sections of the competition with a cohesive and well-developed project. The event, which already lists Iran among the top 10 finalists for the Innovation Award, will officially begin on 29 October 2025.

- Iran FGC Team official website
