= Summit Electric Supply =

Wholesale electrical distributor

Coordinates: 35°6′47.8″N 106°37′1.3″W

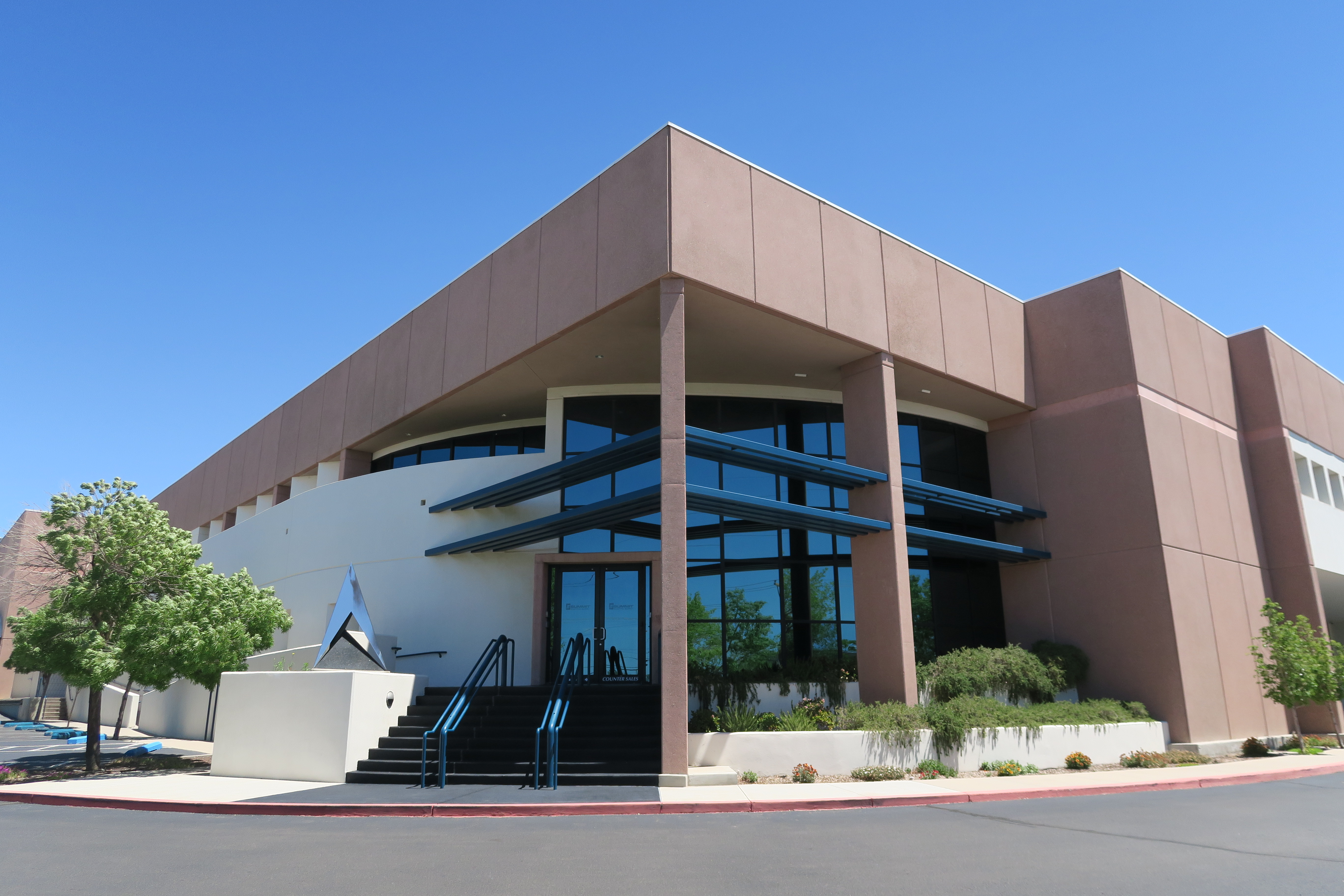
- Headquarters in Albuquerque
- Type: Privately-held
- Industry: Electrical distribution
- Founded: Albuquerque, New Mexico, US August 15, 1977
- Founder: Victor R. Jury Sr., David Meredith, Victor R. Jury Jr.
- Headquarters: Albuquerque, New Mexico, United States
- Number of locations: 22
- Area served: United States
- Key people: Victor R. Jury Jr., Executive Chairman; Patrick Davis, CEO
- Products: Industrial electrical equipment and supplies
- Revenue: ▲$505 million (2018)
- Number of employees: 775+ (2026)
- Website: www.summit.com

Summit Electric Supply is an American wholesale distributor of industrial electrical equipment and supplies, headquartered in Albuquerque, New Mexico, where it was founded in 1977.

The company ranked 17th on Modern Distribution Management's 2019 list of top electrical distributors based on 2018 revenue of US$505 million.

Summit has 25 service centers in New Mexico, Arizona, Texas, Louisiana, and Oklahoma in the US, a service center in Dubai, United Arab Emirates, and three global divisions that support specific industries and specialized project requirements. The company's international sales division and Engineering, Procurement, & Construction (EP&C) division are located in Houston, Texas. Its marine division is in New Orleans, Louisiana.

== History ==
=== 1977 to 1987 ===
The company was incorporated on May 11, 1977 in the state of New Mexico by its original officers Victor Jury Sr., president; David Meredith, vice president and general manager; and Victor Jury Jr., vice president. The elder Jury had previously worked with Meredith at Graybar Electric Co. Jury retired in 1976 after working 28 years at Graybar. Meredith was a former branch manager for the company. Jury Jr. as a teenager had sold light bulbs supplied by his father door-to-door, then worked in an electrical contractor's shop, and become an electrician.

The Jurys and Meredith founded the company in Albuquerque, New Mexico, considering that a service-oriented distributor could compete with bigger companies.

Summit opened its first service center with five employees on August 15, 1977, making sales for $408,000 by the year's end.

In 1979, Summit opened a second location in Grants, New Mexico, then moved into a new headquarters building the following year. After purchasing a branch of Cummins Utility Supply Co. in 1983, Summit opened another location in Farmington, New Mexico, and took its first just-in-time (JIT) systems contract with the Rio Rancho, New Mexico facility of Intel Corp. In a JIT systems contract a customer agrees to purchase all of their materials exclusively from a distributor, who is required to deliver within 24 hours. By 1986, Summit also had JIT systems contracts in place with Sandia National Laboratories in Albuquerque, New Mexico. Other customers included Los Alamos National Laboratory, the City of Albuquerque, Albuquerque Public Schools, and the University of New Mexico.

By the end of the 1987 fiscal year Summit had 76 employees in three locations, and sales were $15.7 million. That year, Summit introduced the 30-Second Counter Service Guarantee according to which customers would receive counter service within 30 seconds or be given $5 toward their purchase. The company also began expanding its operations into Texas and opened its first Texas branch under the name Sierra Electric Supply in Dallas.

=== 1988 to 2008 ===
Co-founder Victor Jury Sr. relocated to Summit's Fort Worth branch when it opened in 1988 and retired in 1990. The younger Jury became Summit's president and CEO. Co-founder David Meredith retired in 1999.

Summit first appeared in electrical distribution industry rankings in 1988 when Electrical Wholesaling magazine ranked Summit 173rd on its list of the top 250 U.S. electrical distributors. In 1989, Electrical Wholesaling wrote about Summit's experience with JIT systems contracts. By 1993, Summit had opened three more locations, moved its headquarters to a new building in Albuquerque, and guaranteed that call-in orders would be ready in 20 minutes.

Summit's annual sales went from $18.6 million in 1989 to over $65 million by 1993, ranking 48th on Electrical Wholesaling magazine's top 250 list. Summit also ranked 16th on the New Mexico Business Weekly’s Private 100 list of privately owned companies.

In 1994, Summit earned an umbrella ISO registration, which certified all of Summit's locations to ISO 9002 quality standards. The company maintained the registration until 2007, and earned an ISO 9001:2008 certification in 2013. From 1994 to 2000, Jury was a member of the National Association of Electrical Distributors Education Foundation Board of Directors, serving as chairman from 1998 to 2000. In 1991 Summit incorporated NAED's Electrical Products Education Course (EPEC) into its employee training program.

When Summit reached its 25th anniversary in 2002, the company ranked 34th on Electrical Wholesaling magazine's top 250 U.S. electrical distributors list. Summit increased sales and added branch locations, some through acquisitions. Between 1990 and 2008, Summit purchased Eastside/Westside Electric Supply in Phoenix, Arizona; Coast Electric in Montclair, California; Tri-Electric Supply in San Antonio, Texas; and Ideal Electric Supply in Killeen, Texas.

Its largest acquisition was at the end of 2002 when Summit purchased the assets of bankrupt competitor Warren Electric Group of Houston, Texas, for $10.5 million. The acquisition doubled the number of Summit employees and locations by adding seven service centers in Texas (Houston, La Porte, Beaumont, Clute, Corpus Christi, Harlingen, and Lufkin); four in Louisiana (New Orleans, Broussard, Sulphur, and Gonzales); an export division based in Houston; and a sales branch in Puerto La Cruz, Venezuela. The service centers in Lufkin, Harlingen, Sulphur, and Puerto La Cruz were closed shortly after.

Electrical industry magazine The Electrical Distributor (tED) published an article about the Warren Electric acquisition in 2003 entitled Surprises for Summit in Gulf Coast Acquisition. The article cited that Summit purchased $100 million in sales for $.10 on the dollar after a purchase deal with another electrical distributor fell through.

Months later, the magazine printed another article about the management style of Jury. The article 30 Seconds to Perfection was derived from Summit's 30-second counter service guarantee and discussed Summit's proactive approach to management, commitment to quality standards, and its ambition to be the best.

In 2004, Summit grew its Gulf Coast operations further when it opened a marine division in New Orleans, Louisiana. That same year, Jury took a two-year term as chairman of the board of directors for the IMARK Group, a member-owned marketing group of 1,100 independently owned U.S. electrical distributors, including Summit.

By 2006, Summit had more than 500 employees, its annual sales exceeded $300 million, and the company was moving forward with an aggressive integration of a new business system to position the company for future opportunities. Summit partnered with German company SAP AG, one of the world's largest software companies, to upgrade its operating system to the enterprise resource planning system SAP. Used by companies internationally, including many of Summit's suppliers, SAP ERP allowed Summit to offer more advanced services and grow its global operations.

As Summit went live with the new system in 2007, growth in the Gulf Coast precipitated a move to a new facility in Houston. The next year, Summit opened two additional locations in Florida, which operated until 2011.

=== 2009 to present ===
The economic downturn that began in 2008 decreased demand in residential construction and reduced manufacturing activity. As a result, Summit shifted its interests to supporting large industrial and commercial projects, leading to its formation of an engineering, procurement, and construction (EP&C) division based out of its new Houston location in 2009. Two years after launching the new division, Summit was awarded the largest EP&C contact in the company's history – an expansion of Refineria de Cartagena (known as Reficar) in Cartagena, Colombia, Latin America – by Chicago Bridge & Iron Company.

In 2010, Modern Distribution Management magazine published its first industry ranking of the top electrical distributors in the U.S. Despite a loss of nearly $80 million in sales from the previous year, Summit ranked 18th based on its 2009 sales of $307 million. The steep decline in total industry sales in 2009, however, made it one of the worst years in the history of the electrical industry. In 2010, Summit experienced another sales decline as economic recovery in Summit's markets continued to stall, causing the company to drop to 23rd on Modern Distribution Management's 2011 list.

To weather out the struggling economy, Summit focused on strategic growth in existing markets and in early 2011 opened its first international service center in the Jebel Ali Free Zone of Dubai, United Arab Emirates. Summit had previously opened a sales office in Dubai in 2007 after serving international customers exclusively through its Houston location since 2002.

The expansion of its international operations led Summit to join Trace International and implement anti-bribery and anti-corruption compliance solutions. In 2011, Trace certified Summit for ethical business practices and policies.

That same year, Summit recognized the increasing number of electrical professionals using mobile devices in the field and subsequently initiated customer and industry focus groups to determine job functions that could be improved with mobile applications. Summit released the NEMA Configuration Guide in 2011 to help identify unknown NEMA receptacle and plug configurations.

Over the next two years, the company released two additional mobile applications: the Conduit Fill Tracker calculated allowable fill rates when adding conductors to tubing or conduit and Summit Mobile took scans of product bar codes and worked in conjunction with the e-commerce content on Summit's website.

As the electrical industry showed stronger signs of recovery and Summit's sales improved, the company opened a new location in Waynoka, Oklahoma in 2012. Summit opened four additional service centers in Texas from 2010 to 2013 to work closer with customers in the rich oil and gas exploration and production industry in the Eagle Ford Shale and Permian Basin areas.

On May 29, 2013, Summit's co-founder and former president Victor Jury Sr. died in Fort Worth, Texas. Later that year, Summit was ranked 17th in Modern Distribution Management magazine's top 25 electrical distributors in the U.S., based on sales of $384 million in 2012– a return to pre-recession levels. Summit was also the 2nd largest revenue producing company in New Mexico by the 2013 New Mexico Private 100 list.

By the end of 2013, Summit's sales were more than $405.9 million and the company had over 600 employees.

2017 was a very significant year in the company's history. In March, Summit announced that Kevin Powell had joined the company to serve as its president. He would report to chairman and chief executive officer Victor Jury Jr. and would be based out of Summit's Albuquerque, New Mexico corporate headquarters.

In June, Summit announced a realignment of the company's sales operations from a two-region model to more efficient four-district model. In addition to the territorial reorganization, Summit announced the creation of four new District Vice President roles to lead the sales teams in those new districts. These roles were filled by Todd Bockenfeld, North Texas District; Richard Landry, South Texas District; Chad Eschete, Louisiana District; Ryan Oehring, Desert Southwest District. Over the following months, Summit named a number of new service center leaders who would be responsible for growing commercial and industrial market sales.

Earlier in the year, David Meeks joined the company's leadership team as vice president of supply chain operations. Meeks would be responsible for Summit's service center logistics as well as the company's quality management system The Summit Way. He would also oversee Summit's central replenishment, purchasing, inventory management, and rebate administration.

== Executive leadership ==
- Victor R. Jury Jr. – executive chairman
- Edward Gerber – president and chief executive officer
- Sheila Hernandez – senior vice president, marketing and supplier relations
- Darin Patrizi – chief financial officer
- Dwayne Roberts – vice president, operations
- Michael Aufdembrink – chief information and technology officer
- Micah Carlton – vice president, associate resources

== Annual sales ==
- 2017: $469,920,077
- 2016: $434,249,768
- 2015: $425,947,985
- 2014: $421,496,696
- 2013: $405,963,534
- 2012: $384,672,990
- 2011: $358,511,795
- 2010: $301,584,700
- 2009: $307,852,995
- 2008: $384,100,494
- 2007: $338,875,423
- 2006: $337,494,096
- 2005: $267,695,889
- 1995: $102,140,318
- 1987: $15,668,451
- 1978: $2,161,872
- 1977: $408,276
