= Onida Electronics =

Indian multinational electronics company

MIRC Electronics Ltd.
- Trade name: Onida
- Formerly: Mirc Electronics Pvt Ltd
- Type: Public
- Traded as: BSE: 500279; NSE: MIRCELECTR
- ISIN: INE303C01016
- Industry: Consumer electronics; Home appliances
- Founded: 11 July 1981; 45 years ago
- Founder: G. L. Mirchandani
- Headquarters: Mumbai, Maharashtra, India
- Area served: Worldwide
- Key people: Vijay J. Mansukhani (Managing director); G Sundar (CEO)
- Products: Televisions; Air conditioners; Washing machines; Refrigerators; Microwaves
- Revenue: ▲₹15,284.6 million (US$160 million)
- Number of employees: 5000
- Parent: Onida Corporation
- Website: www.onida.com

Onida Electronics (formerly Mirc Electronics) is an Indian multinational electronics and home appliances manufacturing company, based in Mumbai. Onida became well known in India for its colour CRT televisions and smart TVs.

== History ==
Onida was started by G.L. Mirchandani and Vijay Mansukhani in 1981 in Mumbai. G.L. Mirchandani is the chairman and managing director of M/s Mirc Electronics Ltd. In 1982, Onida started assembling television sets at their factory in Andheri, Mumbai. It was established as "Mirc Electronics" on 11 January 1981. Since then, Onida has evolved into a multi-product company in the consumer durables and appliances sector.

Onida came out with the famous caption Neighbour's Envy, Owner's Pride. The popular theme of the ads was a devil complete with horns and tail in the 1980s and 1990s. It first appeared in a print ad in 1982 and then as a TV commercial in 1983-84. Onida finally dropped the devil as its mascot in 2009.

The campaign lifted Onida's share of the television market from 5 per cent to 20 per cent, making it India's largest television brand of the era.

Onida has a network of 33 branch offices, 208 Customer Relation Centers and 41 depots spread across India. As on 31 March 2005, Onida had a market capitalization of ₹ 301.46 crore.

Mirc Electronics won an "Award for Excellence in Electronics" in 1999, from the Ministry of Information Technology, Government of India.

The shipments to Arab states of the Persian Gulf contribute almost 65% of Onida's export revenue, while shipments to the fast-growing East African market (Uganda, Tanzania, Kenya and Ethiopia) and the SAARC countries accounted for 16% of export revenues. In addition to countries in the Persian Gulf, Onida has a presence in Russia, Ukraine and neighboring CIS countries. Apart from television exports to Russia, Onida also exports DVD players and high-end LCD televisions.

== Products ==
Onida brand has following range of products:

- LCD TVs
- Plasma TVs
- Smart TVs
- Televisions
- DVD and Home theater systems
- Air conditioners
- Washing machines
- Microwave ovens
- LoudSpeaker
- Mobile phones
- LED TVs
- LCD monitor
- Webcam

== See also ==
- List of electronics brands
