= Metz (company) =

German manufacturer of consumer electronics

Metz mecatech GmbH, Metz Consumer Electronics GmbH
- Type: Private
- Founded: Zirndorf, Germany (28 November 1938)
- Founder: Paul Metz
- Key people: Metz mecatech GmbH: Lauri Jouhki, Gerd Betz Metz Consumer Electronics GmbH: Weizhong Sun, Zhi Wan, Norbert Kotzbauer, Manfred Billenstein, Yuanqi Dong
- Number of employees: ca. 550 (2015)
- Website: www.metz.de

Metz-Werke GmbH & Co. KG was a German consumer electronic manufacturer, Besides Loewe and TechniSat, Metz was the only remaining TV manufacturer which developed and produced their devices in Germany. Its head office is in Zirndorf, Bavaria. The company filed for insolvency in 2014 and backed up by new investors now reformed as two independent companies Metz Consumer Electronics GmbH and Metz mecatech GmbH since 2015.

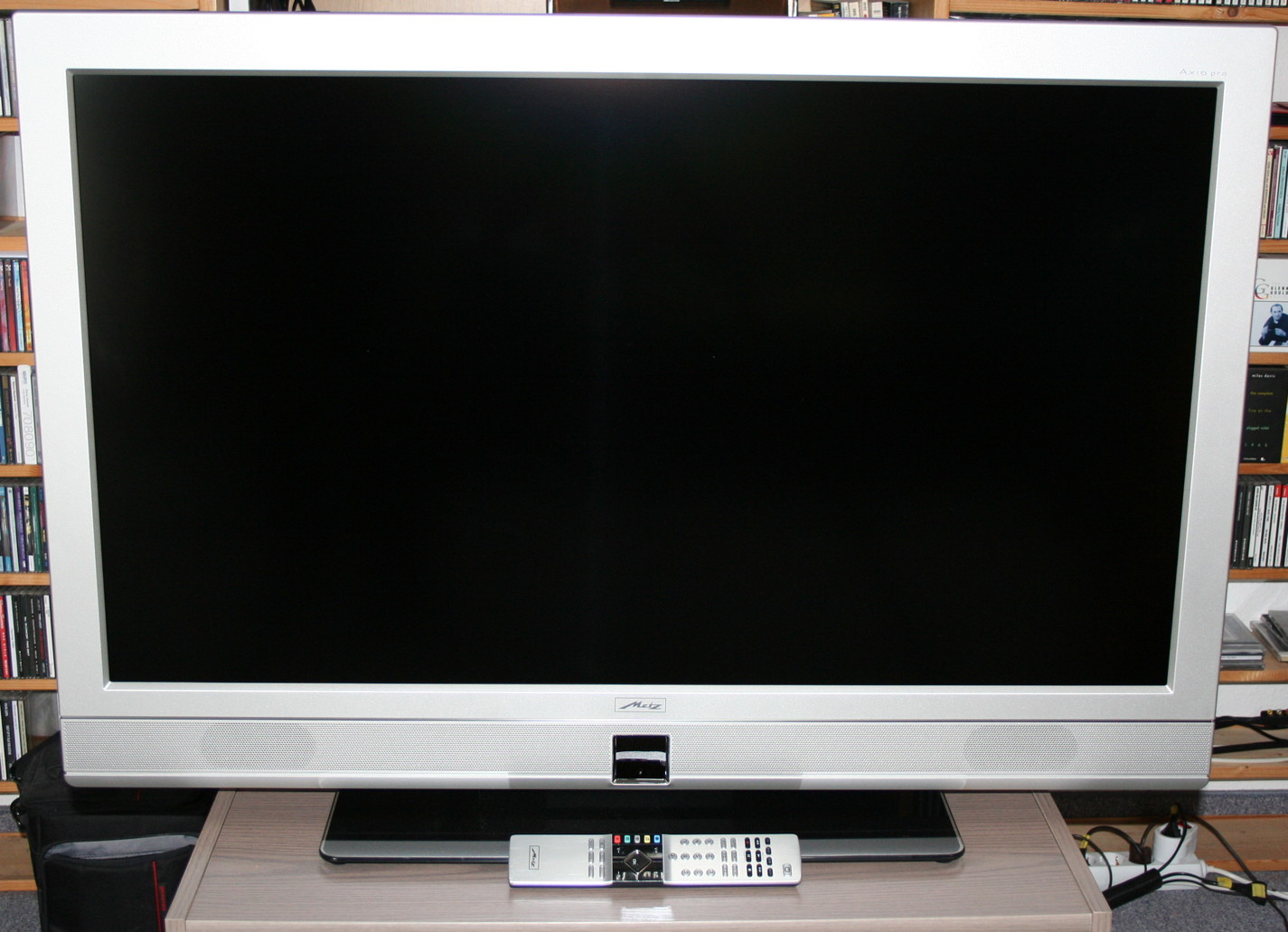
TV Metz Axio 42

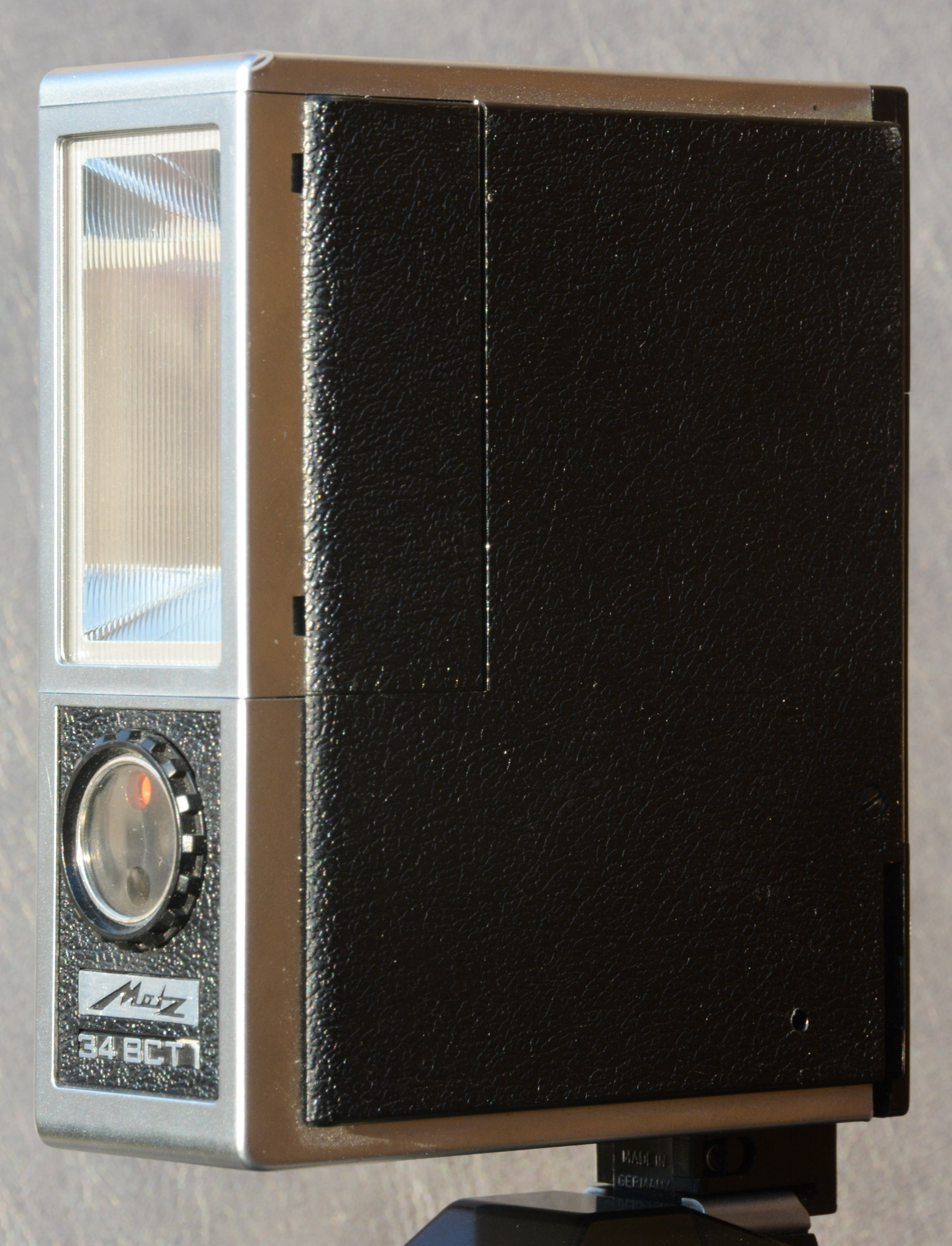
Metz electronic flash Mecablitz 34 BCT 1

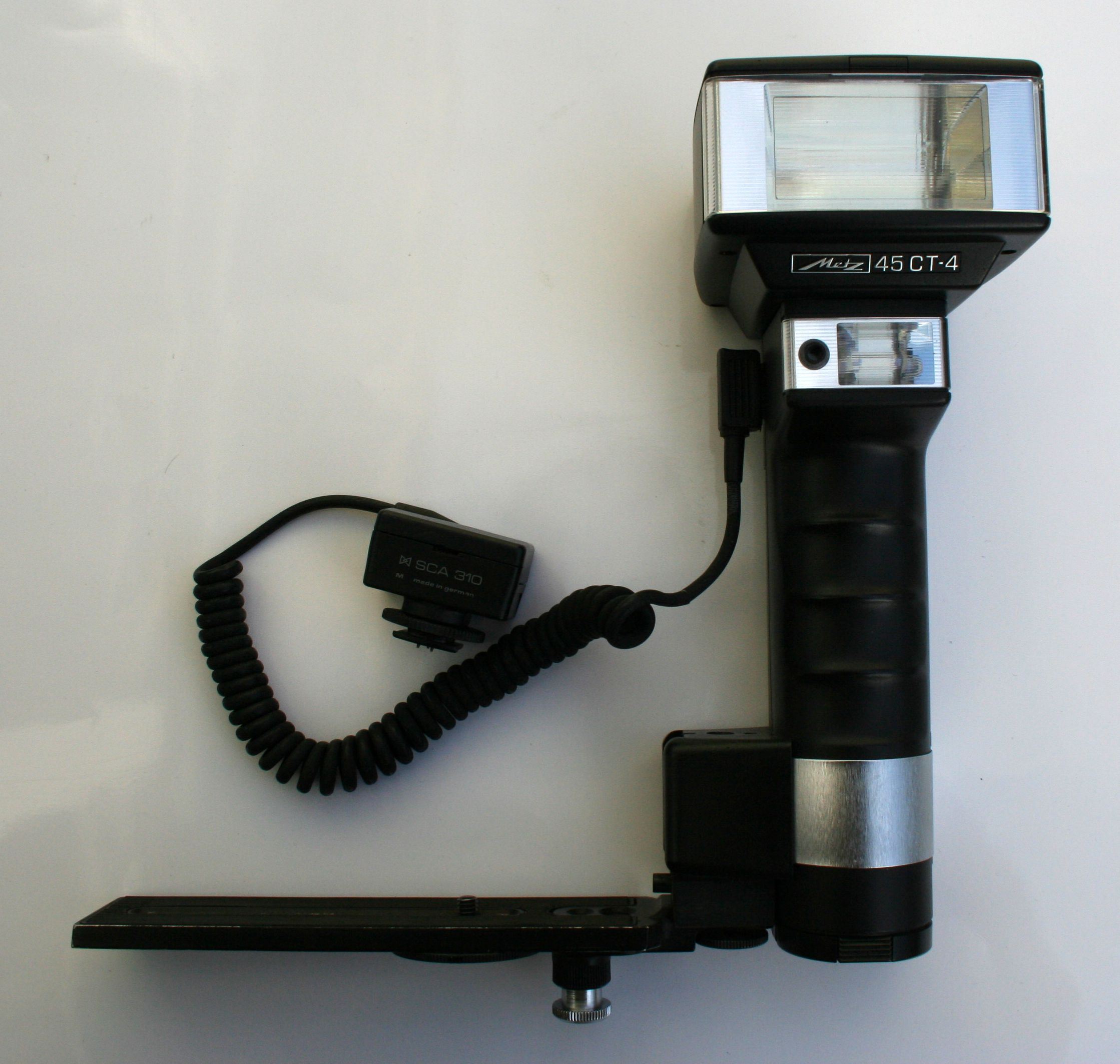
Metz flash 45CT-4 with SCA Adaptor for analogue Canon Cameras

== History ==
- 28. November 1938: Paul Metz founds the company.
- 1939: Manufacture of electronic devices for Carl Zeiss. Development of the product range through the manufacture of products with high-frequency technology.
- until 1945: Production of radio technology for short-wave transmitters and receivers.
- 1947: Consumer electronics division established with the manufacture of the first Metz radios.
- 1950: Complete range of radio devices from the smallest Super radio to the radio gramophone. In keeping with the motto, "Metz - always 1st class", everything was done to ensure “the highest quality of sound and reception”. Construction of an electro-acoustic laboratory and another special laboratory.
- 1952: Another division is established: manufacture of flash units commissioned by Agfa and Carl-Braun begins. Amateur flash photography is revolutionised. Gold medal for sound, design and performance at an international exhibition in Luxembourg, certificate of honour and gold medal at an international exhibition in Thessaloniki. Manufacture of Metz “mecablitz” flash units begins.
- 1953: Spectacular presentation of 8 table and stand units at the “Great German Radio, Phonograph and Television Exhibition” in Düsseldorf.
- 1954: Worldwide sensation - production of the “Babyphon” (battery powered radio-phonograph combination), the first portable radio with a record player.
- 1955: TV manufacture begins. Metz presents the first television set with 3D surround sound system at the radio and television exhibition in Düsseldorf.
- 1957: The third division is established with the opening of a factory in Zirndorf making sound equipment storage units. Metz brings the first electron transistor flash unit in the world to the market “mecablitz 100”.
- 1958: First hi-fi systems from Metz: stereo hi-fi system "410" with 2 channel amplifier, stereo hi-fi music cabinet “705” with stereo auto-changer.
- 1963: 25 years of Metz.
- 1966: A new TV set factory opens in Zirndorf. Metz brings cassette players to the Hanover Trade Fair for the first time.
- 1967: Manufacture of colour TVs begins.
- 1972: Production of flash units reaches 2.5 million.
- 1978: “markt intern” names Metz as “No. 1 retail partner” for the first time.
- 1979: Inclusion of plastic in manufacturing. Development of the SCA adapter system for adapting cameras by different manufacturers for Metz flash units.
- 1982: Production of flash units reaches 5 million.
- 1987: Conversion to GmbH & Co. KG (German limited company).
- 1989: Product range is extended with the addition of the VHS and S-VHS camcorder and S-VHS video recorder.
- 1990: Metz starts using its own 100-Hertz technology. Metz receives performance index award for the first time: a survey by rf-Brief puts Metz at No. 1.
- 1991: Construction of a development centre in Zirndorf.
- 1993: Founder Paul Metz dies. The company continues under the leadership of his wife Helene Metz.
- 1994: Flash unit mecablitz 50 MZ-5 is introduced; for the first time, a Metz flash unit is controlled by 3 micro computers.
- 1995: Start of Metz's module concept - modular chassis construction allows TV sets to be individually adapted. Implementation of a computer-like slot system for the TV chassis – making it possible for uncomplicated and individual upgrading, conversion and retrofitting to be carried out on-site by Metz's technical partners in line with customer wishes.
- 1997: 50 years of Metz – consumer electronics. The Paul and Helene Metz Foundation is established. Presentation of the “varioline” individual TV range – in 4:3 and 16:9 versions. A variable slot system and individual colouring (64,000 colour variations) allows maximum adaptation to customer requirements.
- 1998: Anniversary: 60 years of Metz. As part of the photokina trade fair, Metz presents the world's smallest flash unit with high light output and the simplest 2-button operation. General conversion of TV manufacture to 100 hertz technology.
- 1999: Construction of a new service centre and relocation of the whole company to Zirndorf. At the IFA in Berlin, Metz presents new TV sets from its premium range, featuring extremely thin cathode ray tubes (4:3 and 16:9) as well as integrated room lighting + 2 DVD players + a hi-fi CD receiver.
- 2000: photokina: Metz also comes into its own in the digital sector - introducing the newest generation of flash units, with a simplified operating concept and exceptional special functions, as well as a generation of updateable SCA-3002 adapters. Start of Metz's digital module concept: - presentation of the first fully integrated DVB-S module for the novel digital SAT-TV in Spring: all TV sets made after April 1997 can be digitally retrofitted. Presentation of high-quality TV sets in the Astral/Spectral design range. A combination of high-quality material, anodized aluminium and recyclable plastics create an impressive whole.
- 2001: Extension of the plastics factory. IFA Berlin: Expansion of digital TV retrofit sets in the DVB-T and DVB-C section. Introduction of high-quality 42” plasma TV sets in 16:9 format. Extensive upgrading of the flash range in the digital camera division.
- 2002: Beginning of a new generation of chassis with intuitive operation and new, comfortable remote control. Expansion of the DVB module to include DVB-S and DVB-T with CI interfaces. 10 millionth flash unit.
- 2003: Fully integrated hard disk recorder with timeshift and background recording functions.
- 2004: World first: adaptive 28 CS-2 digital flash unit with immediate correction button.
- 2005: Metz's in-house design of “made in Germany” LCD-TV sets (HDTV ready) are introduced for the first time, together with the new Slim TV product range with visibly reduced CRT housing depth.
- 2006: Numerous awards for Metz LCD TVs; earns first place for both picture quality and user convenience. Talio: best selling LCD TV in specialist retailers. Introduction of the first flash unit with USB interface and innovative dual reflector technology.
- 2007: LCD TV range with HDTV reception. Globally unique retrofitting.
- 2008: Anniversary: 70 years of Metz. Wide range of LCD TVs with high definition 42” full HD panels, 100 Hz DMC technology and integrated hard disk recorder. An innovative world first – wireless macro flash with two individually controllable reflectors.
- 2009: Expansion of the LCD TV range with the addition of a 55” LCD Metz Sirius 32 HDTV 100R, which stands out as a reference model in the 32” segment. All Metz LCDs are equipped with 100 Hz or 200 Hz DMC and full HD technology.
- 2010: Metz is extending four of its LCD product families through the addition of energy-efficient LED technology. Metz is updating its system flash range with 25 new or revised models. The 24 AF-1 digital and the 44 AF-1 digital are being presented as the new high-performance classes.
- 2011: Metz presents the smart linking solution ‘Metz Media System’. The LCD TV range is being extended through the addition of two 3D-compatible product families.
- 19 November 2014: Metz filed for insolvency.
- January 2015: About 110 of the 540 employees will be laid off.
- March 2015: Two investors were found. The company will be split in two. The TV business is taken over by the Chinese electronics manufacturer Skyworth as Metz Consumer Electronics GmbH, whereas the plastics technology and flash business were bought by the local Daum Group (Germany) to firm Metz mecatech GmbH. 298 of the employees will be taken over.
- 2020: Metz filed for insolvency again.

== Products ==
It also built electronic flashes for use with many brands of cameras. The flash devices use adaptors, the SCA system (Special Camera Adaption), to make them compatible with different brands of cameras. Metz is also well known for its high-end television sets.

As of 2025, Metz appears to be out of the flash business.

== Gallery ==
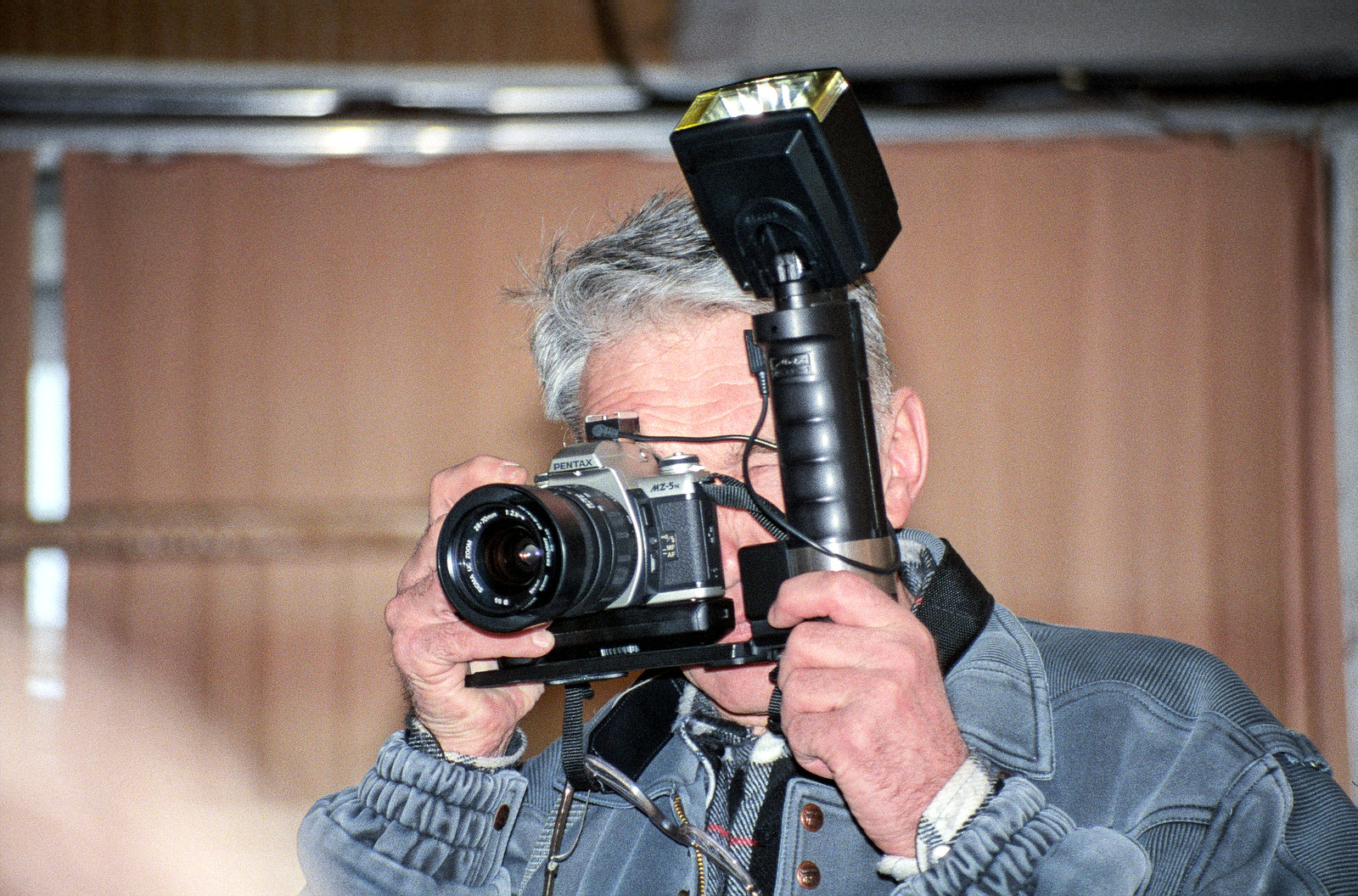
A photographer hands Pentax MZ-5n with Metz flashlight

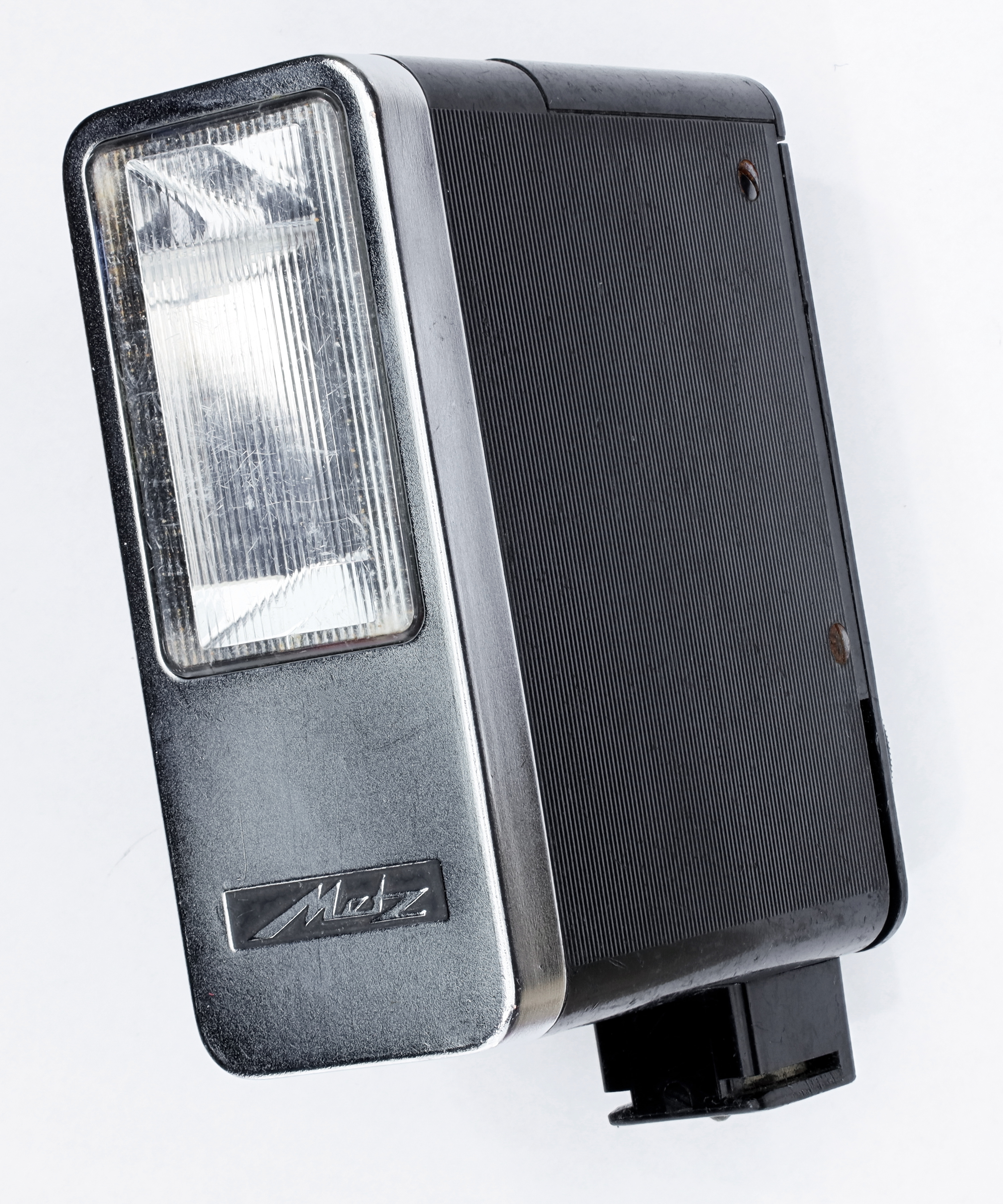
Front view of an Metz 171 mecablitz - Compact electronic flash, 1967

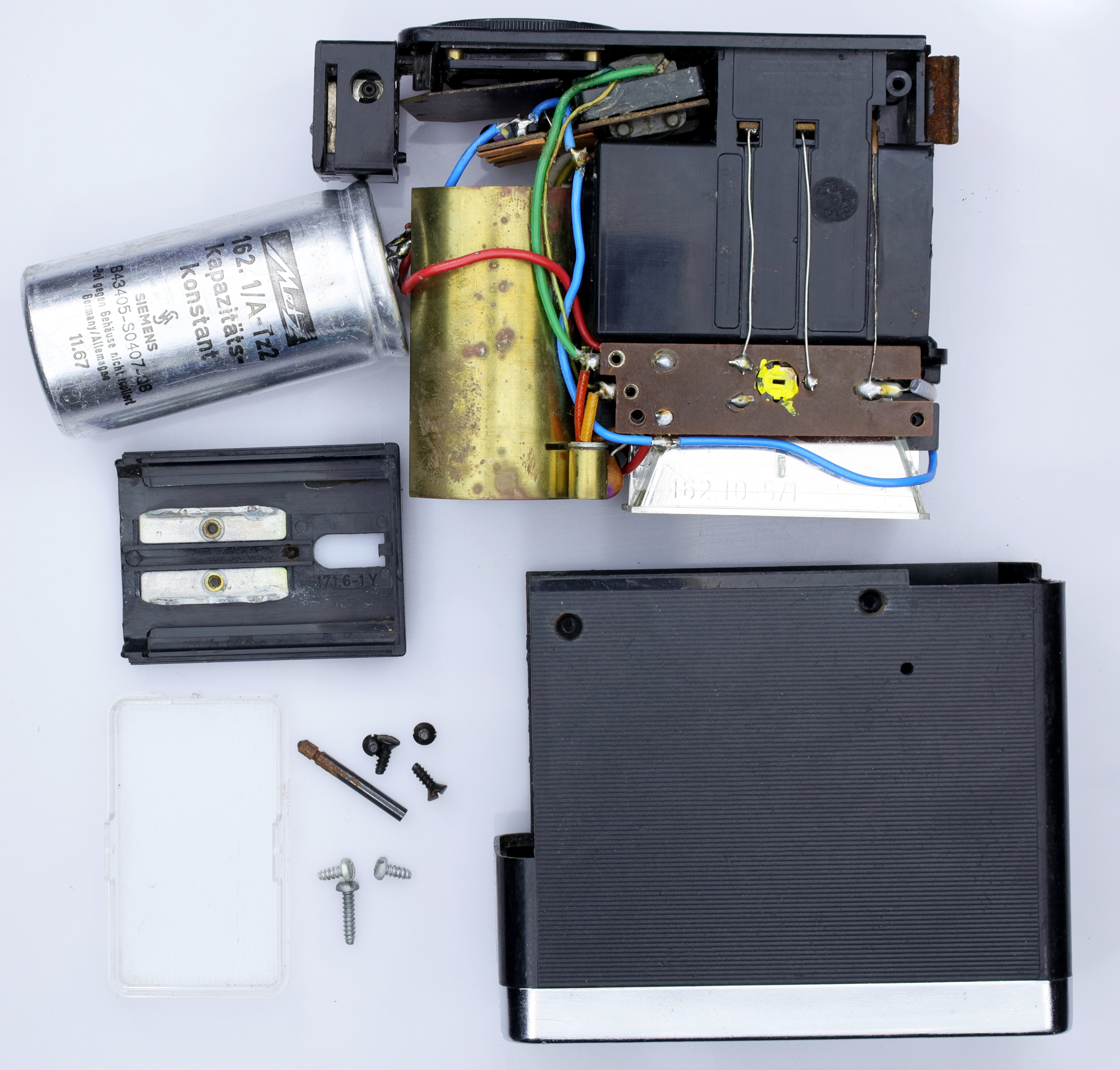
Metz 171 mecablitz - compact electronic flash disassembled

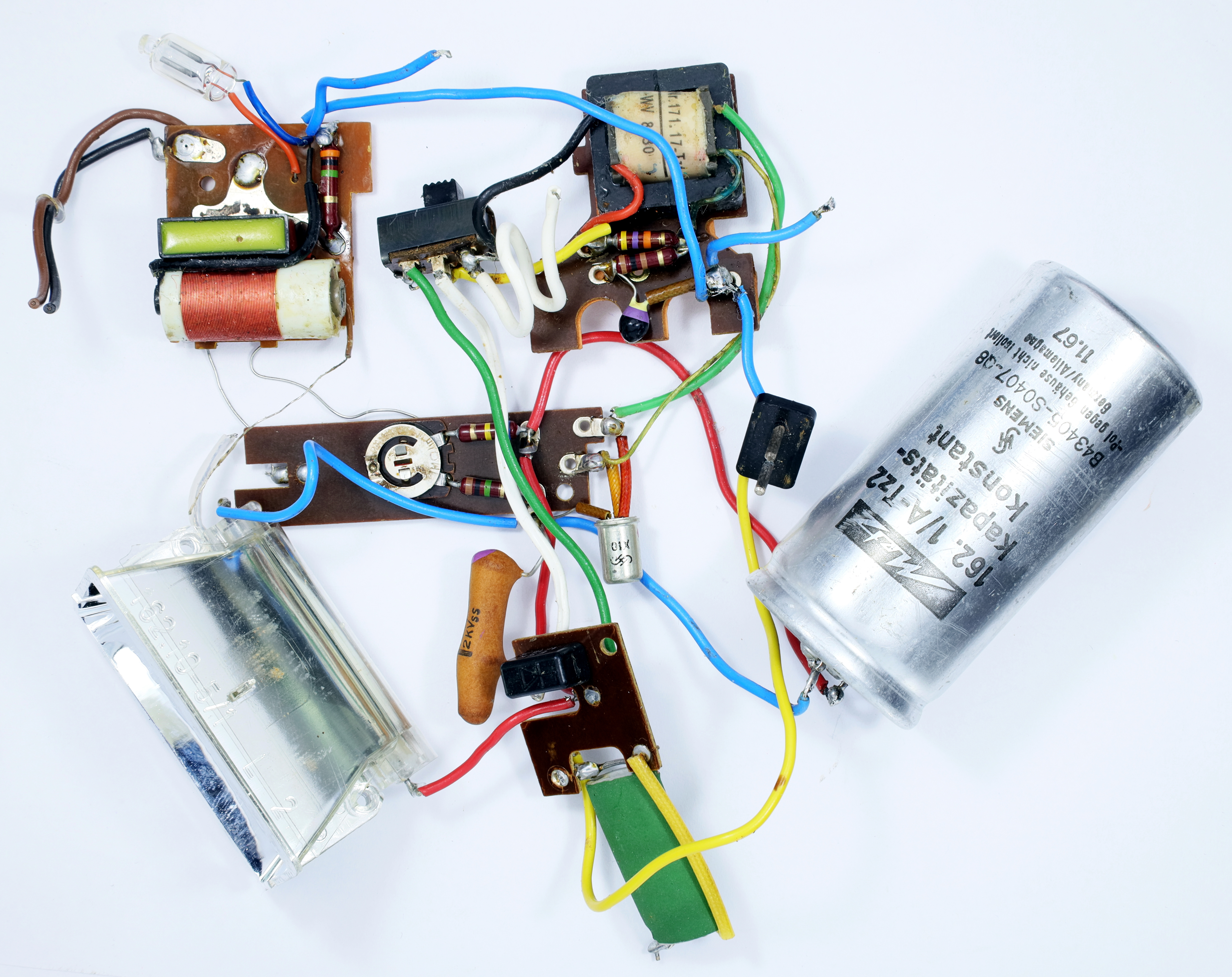
Metz 171 mecablitz - compact electronic flash disassembled, 1967

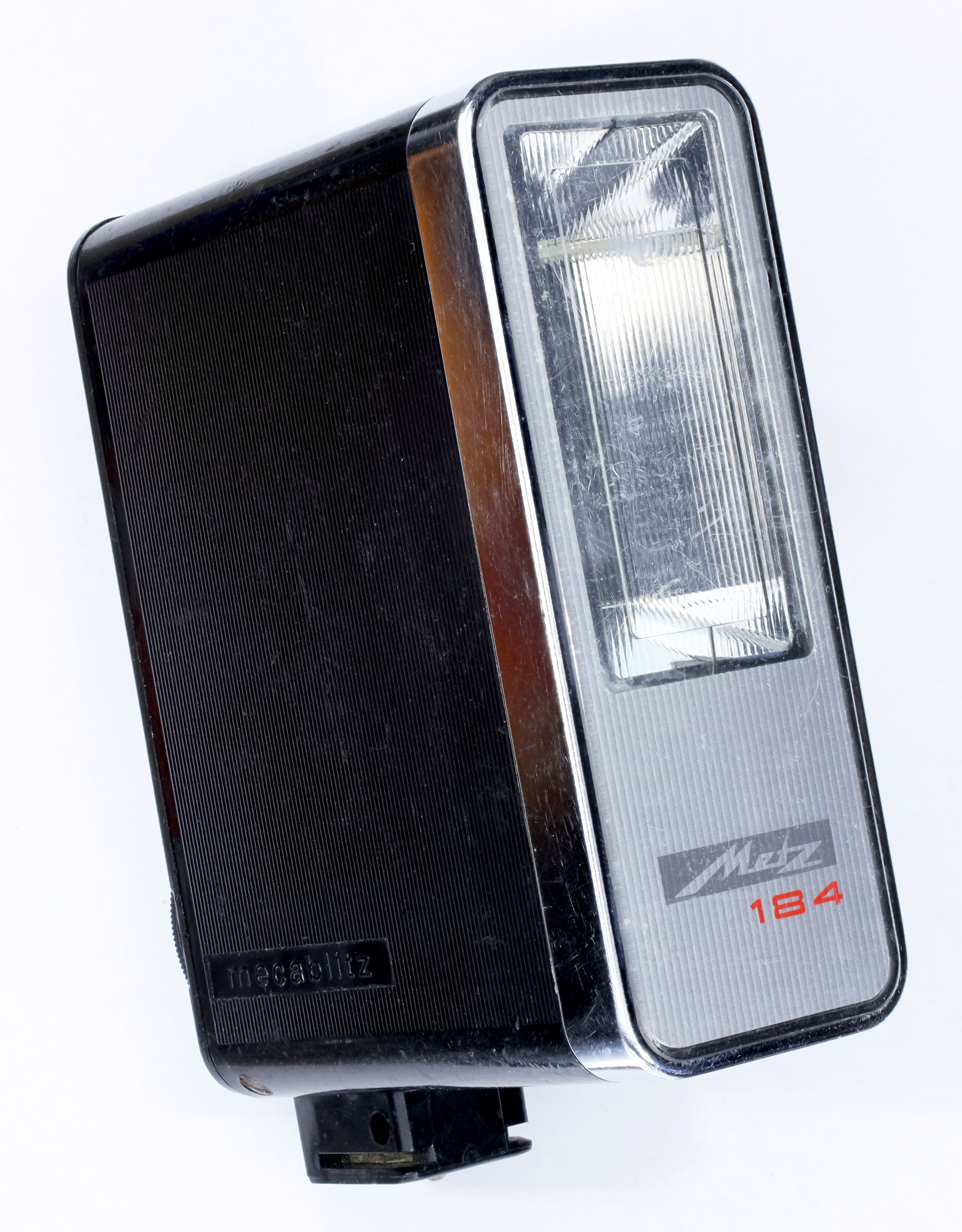
Metz 184 mecablitz - electronic flash, 1970

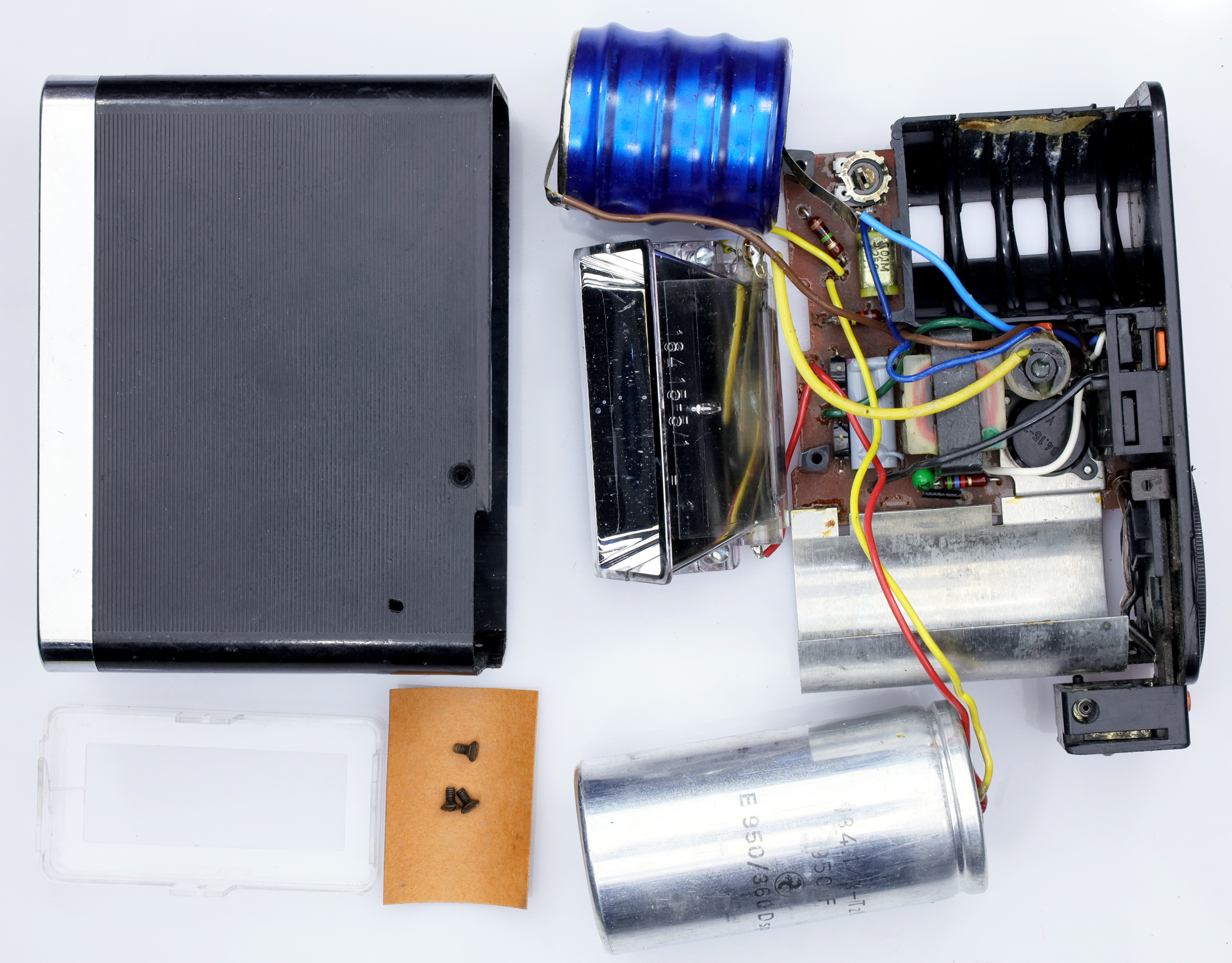
Metz 184 mecablitz - electronic flash disassembled, 1970
