= Geliyoo =

Turkish company founded in 2010

Geliyoo Bilişim
- Company type: Limited company
- Founded: 18 November 2010
- Founder: Buray Anıl Savaş; Fatih Arslan
- Headquarters: Turkey
- Key people: Hakan Atabaş (CEO); Fatih Arslan
- Services: Online search
- Number of employees: 52 (2013)
- Website: www.geliyoo.com

Geliyoo is a Turkish company specializing in internet-related services and products. Founded on 18 November 2010 by Buray Anıl Savaş and Fatih Arslan, development had started a year earlier, in 2009. Geliyoo's services include a news aggregator and a search engine, which were released in 2013, and an in-development browser. The search engine had a major update in 2017, but as of 2022 is no longer available.

The company faced criticism in 2017, when it was revealed that it used a script sold on the internet to retrieve and show results from Google for its search engine, and when its website theme was also found to have been purchased from a third party. Geliyoo has also been accused of being a propaganda tool of the Turkish Government.

== History ==
The company was founded on 18 November 2010 by Buray Anıl Savaş and Fatih Arslan. Geliyoo is a noun formed from the verb "to come". In an interview with the İhlas News Agency, Fatih Arslan said that the name was chosen because it was commonly used in the Turkish language. According to a single announcement in 2010 by Demirören News Agency, the technology was developed by a team of 150 all-Turkish engineers, calling it the "National Google". In July 2013, the news aggregator of the company was activated.

From 2015, press coverage of Geliyoo began to name Hakan Atabaş, rather than Savaş, as Arslan's co-founder. The test run of the updated search engine started in January 2017. A few days prior, Transportation, Maritime and Communications Minister Ahmet Arslan had called for "a national search engine because [Turkey] currently depend[s] on foreign technologies", which caused the news about Geliyoo to go viral. The owners of Geliyoo claimed that they expected 3 million users by 2018, which they said would be 7% of the market share. The company also announced that they were working on a browser, which was due to be released in the second quarter of 2018. As of September 2022, Geliyoo's website displays a blank page.

== Services ==
The search engine, news aggregator and RSS service of the company were launched on 3 June 2013. Geliyoo claimed that the search engine used GeliyooBot/1.0 to analyze 7–10 TeraBytes of data per day. The RSS feed was reported to only include links which have a picture are shown, as the ones without a picture are "not interesting for the user". In 2016, the company claimed that their search engine did not perform its own indexing because they did not have sufficient computing resources. The search engine of Geliyoo launched again on 17 January 2017 with a test run. The company spent around 10 million Turkish liras on development in ten years. According to an announcement on Geliyoo's website, a browser to support the search engine is in-development, but the full version has not been released.

== Criticism ==
When reviewing the search engine in October 2013, Ruhan Alpaydın writing for SoL said that the website gave the "look of a student project" and that it was "nowhere to being a search engine", as Geliyoo mostly showed few and irrelevant results.

Geliyoo was criticized in the Turkish media in January 2017, only hours after the search engine was announced, when it was discovered that the results seen in the search engine were being retrieved from Google Custom Search using a pre-existing script sold for US$15 on the internet. This caused some commentators to question the claim made by the company to have spent over 10 million Turkish liras in ten years on development. The media also revealed that the website theme and substructure design used on Geliyoo were sold on the internet for only US$59 in a form that took no more than an hour to install. Multiple doppelgänger sites were made to mock the company, such as "Gidiyoo" (lit. transl. "to go [away]") and "Gelemiyoo" (lit. transl. "not being able to come"), which show results in the same way and cost only US$60 to make. Geliyoo responded to the critics by saying that the site in its current form was only being used to test their domain name and that the actual search engine was not yet available to the public.

In January 2017, the Ministry of Transport and Infrastructure (Note: Known as the Ministry of Transport, Maritime and Communications at that time.) denied that they had provided any financial or moral support for the company after several sources "made the perception that the search engine was supported by the ministry". In an opinion piece published on 10 March 2017 in The New York Times, Busra Erkara said that the company "will automatically block websites and content that aren't fit for 'Turkish culture and familial values'", and argued that Geliyoo was a part of the "censorship and propaganda" of the Turkish Government.
