= PowerLab =

Australian data research company

PowerLab (before 1998 was referred to as MacLab) is a data acquisition system developed by ADInstruments comprising hardware and software and designed for use in life science research and teaching applications. It is commonly used in physiology, pharmacology, biomedical engineering, sports/exercise studies and psychophysiology laboratories to record and analyse physiological signals from human or animal subjects or from isolated organs. The system consists of an input device connected to a Microsoft Windows or Mac OS computer using a USB cable and LabChart software which is supplied with the PowerLab and provides the recording, display and analysis functions. The use of PowerLab and supplementary ADInstruments products have been demonstrated on the Journal of Visualised Experiments.

The original MacLab unit was developed in the late 1980s to run with only Macintosh computers to perform computer-based data acquisition and analysis. The MacLab product range was renamed "PowerLab" in 1997 to reflect the cross-platform nature of the system.

The PowerLab system is essentially a peripheral device designed to perform various functions needed for data acquisition, signal conditioning and pre-processing. Versatile display options and analysis functions are complemented by the ability to export data to other software (such as Microsoft Excel).

== How is data acquired? ==
- External signals detected are converted into analog electrical signal
- Signals are amplified to amplify signals and filtered to remove unwanted frequencies or noise
- Analog signal is multiplexed to an analog-to-digital converter
- The digitized signal is transmitted to the computer using USB connection
- Software receives, displays, analyses and records data in real time

== PowerLab models ==
=== Current ===
- /35 Series for research: Released in 2011. Includes PowerLab 4/35, PowerLab 8/35 and PowerLab 16/35.
- /30 Series for research: Released in 2004. Includes PowerLab 4/30, PowerLab 8/30 and PowerLab 16/30.
- /26 Series for teaching: Released in 2007. Includes PowerLab 2/26, PowerLab 4/26, PowerLab26T
- /T Series for teaching: Released in 2007. Includes PowerLab 15T

=== Previous ===
- Original MacLab: First released November 1988. Includes MacLab/4 and MacLab/8.
- E series: First released October 1992. Includes MacLab /2e, MacLab /4e, MacLab /8e, MacLab /200, PowerLab /200, MacLab /400, PowerLab /400, PowerLab /410, PowerLab /415, and PowerLab /800
- S series: First released August 1994. For SCSI connection only and includes MacLab /4S, PowerLab /4S, PowerLab /8S and PowerLab /16S.
- SP series: First released May 1999. For SCSI and USB connections and includes PowerLab /4SP, PowerLab /8SP, PowerLab /16SP, and PowerLab 4ST.
- /20 series: First released July 2000. USB connections only and includes PowerLab 2/20, PowerLab 4/20, and PowerLab 4/20T.
- /T series: First released September 2002. PowerLab 10T for teaching.
- /25 series: First released September 2003. Requires high speed USB 2.0 connections and includes PowerLab 2/25, PowerLab 4/25, and PowerLab 4/25T.

== Software for PowerLab ==
=== LabChart ===
Formerly known as Chart. The software functions like a traditional multi-channel chart recorder, XY plotter, polygraph and digital voltmeter. It is compatible with both Windows and Macintosh operating systems. The software has hardware settings control, performs analysis in real-time and offline without the loss of raw data, procedure automation via editable macros, and multiple block samplings for the recording and settings of different signals within one file. Large specialised add-ons called Modules provide data acquisition and analysis features for specific applications such as ECG, blood pressure, cardiac output, HRV, etc. Smaller software plugins provide additional and specialized functionality to LabChart. Extensions perform functions such as file translations into other formats (including PVAN and Igor Pro) and specialist analysis functions (for specific research areas such as spirometry and ventricular pressure). The last version of LabChart6 (version 6.1.3) was released in January 2009.

In April 2009, LabChart 7 was released and incorporates the features of a multi-channel digital oscilloscope that allows recording and averaging of up to sixteen signals in real time.

=== LabTutor ===
Software provides a range of hands-on laboratory background for students that includes experimental background & protocols, data acquisition & analysis, and report generation within one interface. The software and accompanying PowerLab hardware is configured for immediate use with step-by-step instructions designed to maximize student productivity by applying independent learning techniques to a suite of human and animal physiological experiments. Recently, LabAuthor software was released to provide educators the ability to design or edit existing LabTutor experiments and tailor the experiments to suit their practical classes without the need of programming or HTML skills.

=== Scope ===
Records and analyzes high frequency signals that are time-locked to a stimulus. The display allows computer screen to act as an oscilloscope and XY plotter

=== Limitations ===
The PowerLab messaging protocol is not publicly available and there is no public API for traditional programming languages such as C.
