= TechniSat =

German manufacturing company

TechniSat Digital GmbH
- Type: Private
- Founded: 10 June 1987
- Founder: Peter Lepper
- Headquarters: Daun, Germany
- Number of locations: Eisenach, Stassfurt, Schöneck, Berlin, Wolfsburg, Paris, Wrocław, Budapest, Kosmonosy
- Key people: Peter Lepper, Stefan Kön
- Products: Radios; Satellite TV receivers Televisions; Car navigations Tablet computers
- Revenue: € 440.3 million (2010)
- Number of employees: 2500 (in 2011)
- Website: www.technisat.com

TechniSat is a German manufacturer of consumer electronics. The company produces radios, satellite TV receivers, televisions, car navigation, and entertainment systems. Together with Loewe and Metz, it is one of the few remaining independent consumer electronics companies which develop and produce consumer electronics products in Germany and Europe.

== History ==
TechniSat was established in 1987 in Daun by Peter Lepper. In 1992, the company launched then the smallest digital antenna in the world. In 2007, it started its own TechniTipp-TV channel, which was closed down in September 2008.

In 2009, TechniSat had a revenue of nearly 350 million Euro (up from 305 million in 2008).
