= Luxafor =

Office productivity tool brand

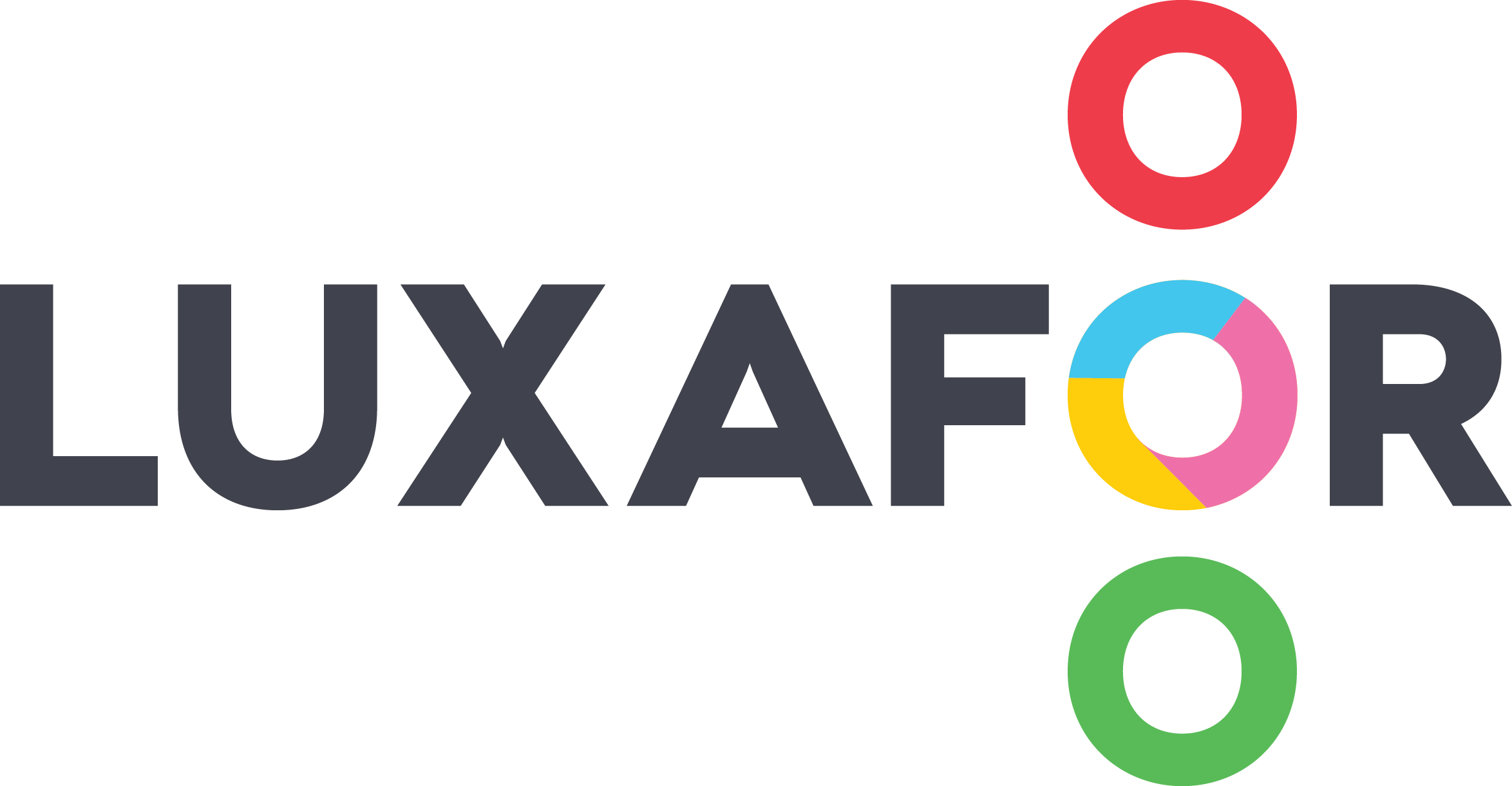

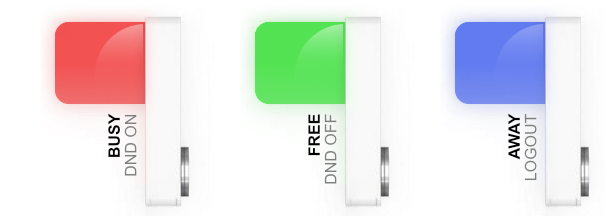
- Luxafor Flag
- Product type: Availability indicators
- Current owner: SIA Greynut
- Produced by: SIA Greynut
- Country: Latvia
- Introduced: January 12, 2015; 11 years ago
- Markets: Worldwide
- Tagline: "Work Bright, Earn Right." "Boost individual productivity" "Skyrocket business goals"
- Website: www.luxafor.com

Luxafor (/ˈlʌksəfɔːr/) is a brand of office productivity tools designed to improve efficiency and communication in workplaces. The brands main product is LED status indicators for use in office settings. Luxafor is a product line under the company SIA Greynut, based in Riga, Latvia.

== History ==
Luxafor was developed by the technology company SIA Greynut. The brand first gained attention through a Kickstarter campaign in 2015, which aimed to fund its initial product, the Luxafor Flag. Although the campaign was unsuccessful in reaching its funding goal, the product was still brought to market.

In 2017, Luxafor launched another Kickstarter campaign for the Luxafor Bluetooth, a wireless version of its LED status indicator. This campaign also did not meet its funding goal, but like its predecessor, the product was still developed and released. Despite initial setbacks, Luxafor Bluetooth has become one of the brand's leading products.

== Products ==
Luxafors main product range is LED status indicators, including:

=== Luxafor Flag ===
A USB-powered LED indicator that shows different colors to signal the user's availability.

=== Luxafor Bluetooth ===
A wireless LED indicator controlled via Bluetooth, integrating with productivity tools like Slack and Microsoft Teams.

=== Luxafor Switch ===
An advanced status indicator designed to manage room and workspace availability.

=== Other ===
Other Luxafor products include CO_{2} Dongle, Smart Button, Mute Button, Pomodoro Timer and others.

== Features ==
Luxafor products are known for their customizable indicators, integration capabilities with IFTTT, Zapier, and remote control features. They are compatible with various operating systems, including Windows and macOS, and can be integrated with numerous communication and productivity platforms, like Microsoft Teams and Cisco Jabber.
