= Redarc Electronics =

Australian electronics company

REDARC Electronics Pty. Ltd.
- Type: Private
- Industry: Manufacturing
- Founded: 1979
- Headquarters: Lonsdale, South Australia
- Key people: Anthony Kittel, CEO & Managing Director
- Website: REDARC Electronics

REDARC Electronics is an Australian electronics manufacturer established in 1979. It is located in Lonsdale, South Australia, an industrial suburb south of Adelaide.

REDARC products includes voltage converters, inverters, power supplies, battery chargers, and trailer braking solutions for industries such as automotive and trucking, agriculture, medical, and defense. They are often used in vehicles for various purposes. REDARC holds the patents for the technologies on which these products are developed.

The company has been listed on the Deloitte Technology Fast 50 Australia list for three consecutive years - 2011, 2012, and 2013. It was also named the 2014 Telstra Business of the year and 2017 Global Media Award Winner for the Tow-Pro Elite Electronic Brake Controller at the SEMA Show in Las Vegas.

In 2019, REDARC's Lonsdale facility added 3,000m^{2} of advanced manufacturing space in a $22 million development, enabling REDARC to increase its manufacturing capacity by 250%. The additional space now houses a new surface-mount technology line for loading electronic components, an electromagnetic compatibility chamber, and a vibration test lab. The vibration test lab enables highly accelerated lifetime testing of products, simulating 10 years of life in a reported span of two days. Three new universal collaborative robots ‘Cobots’ have also been purchased. In the same year, REDARC has also moved into the Defense sector and has planned to work with the UK-based advanced manufacturing company MARL International to manufacture and support special light emitting diodes (LED) to be installed on the Type 26 Global Combat Ship-Australia (GCS-A), if BAE Systems secured the SEA 5000 Future Frigates contract.
