= Orion Electronics =

Company

Orion Electronics Ltd.
- Formerly: Magyar Wolframlámpagyár; Orion Villamossági Rt.; Magyar Wolframlámpa Kremeneczky János Rt.
- Type: Subsidiary of Thakral Group (ASX: THG)
- Industry: consumer electronics
- Founded: 1913
- Founder: János Kremeneczky
- Headquarters: Budapest, Hungary; Sóskút, Hungary
- Area served: worldwide
- Key people: G.S Arora, H.S Chadha, Shourya Mohan
- Products: televisions; DVD players; home cinema; MP3 players; MP4 players; GPS; air conditioners; fans; microwave ovens; washing machines; refrigerators; vacuum cleaners; dishwashers; multifunctional ovens; oil radiators; TFT computer monitors
- Parent: Thakral Corporation
- Website: http://webshop.orion.hu/

Orion Electronics Ltd is a consumer electronics company headquartered in Budapest, Hungary. Orion supplies a wide range of brown and white goods including televisions (LCD, Plasma and CRT), DVD players/recorders/with HDD, home theatre systems, Navigation Systems, Portable DVD Players, active speaker systems, computer monitors, MP3/MP4 players, washing machines, dishwashers, cooking ranges, microwave ovens and the full range of small domestic appliances. The company is owned and managed by the Thakral Corporation of Singapore.

== History ==
The company was established by János Kremeneczky.

The predecessor of Orion Radio and Electrical Company, the Hungarian Tungsten Lamp Factory was founded on 1 June 1913 by János Kremeneczky, an Austrian businessman. Kremeneczky had already established his own incandescent lamp factory in Vienna in 1882. The battle between gas and electric lighting was still going on when Kremeneczky started producing tungsten filament light bulbs in 1904. In 1908, he produced 7.5 million incandescent lamps. He chose Budapest as the centre for further expansion, finding that in the Hungarian part of the monarchy, labour costs were lower and state support for industrialisation could offer him great opportunities. Thus, in 1913-June, the Hungarian Tungsten Lamp Factory, Orion's predecessor, was established on the fourth floor of the building of the Budapest Electric Works at 74 Váci street. The factory was a successful producer of incandescent lamps, dry-cell lamps and other electrical goods. The then internationally renowned United Light Bulb and Electrical Company (in English it is known as Tungsram company) began to fear for its achievements and its market. This competitive battle between the two factories lasted for decades. Thus, the history of the factory is closely linked to that of the Tungsram. A constant battle for markets, production was carried out on common sites, production was regulated by cartel agreements to create peaceful coexistence. in 1917, the much larger Tungsram company took an interest in the Hungarian Tungsten Lamp Factory Ltd in an attempt to reduce competition. The Hungarian Tungsten Factory remained financially sound during the First World War, and from 1920 the company's production and market position strengthened significantly again. And Kremeneczky's Vienna factory mass-produced radio tubes from 1923. These brought the competitive struggle between the two companies to the surface once again.

The two main profiles of the factory were the radio production started in 1923 and the production of glass and vacuum technology products (ampoules, thermos). The signal generators, oscilloscopes and pulse generators manufactured by Orion's instrumentation class have done a good job for the domestic industry as well as for export. Orion has been producing electrical goods (like radios since the 1920s. The television production started in 1956. Since the 1970s, the company designed, produced, installed and maintained microwave telecommunication equipment also.

On October 1, 1924, the commercial body of the Hungarian Tungsten Factory changes its name to Orion Electricity Co. and from 1925, all its products are marketed under the ORION trademark, both in Hungary and abroad. 1925 was a significant year in the life of the factory as the ORION brand was successfully launched. The ORION three-headed mark was designed by graphic artist József Bottlik. On 30 June 1926, the factory began manufacturing radio sets, using a patent from the German Telefunken factory.

The first radios were the 7023, 7024, this 7000 series was used until 1935-36. When the production of radio sets began, fierce competition immediately developed on the domestic market between the Hungarian Tungsten Lamp Factory, United Tungsten, the Telephone Factory, the Dutch Philips and the German Standard. In 1926, the Tungsram Company manufactured and marketed two types of radio under a British patent. The rivalry between the two companies lasted until 1931, when Tungsram acquired the majority of Kremenczky's shares in his Vienna company and thus in the Hungarian Tungsten Lamp Factory and Orion Ltd. In September 1930, the daily radio set production of the Hungarian Tungsten Lamp Factory reached 50 units. In the same year, the export of ORION radio sets started. In parallel with the production of radio sets, the production and distribution of radio parts was also started. The factory also made significant progress in the promotion of radio. With the death of János Kremeneczky in October 1934, the sole control of the company passed to Tungsram. By this time, radio broadcasting was available throughout the country and demand for radio sets had increased. However, new competitors in the radio industry emerged: the Hungarian factories of Standard, Philips, Siemens and Telefunken. Cartel agreements were established between the factories, so that the Hungarian Tungsten Lamp Factory and ORION sold their surplus equipment abroad. The biggest markets during these years were Germany, United Kingdom, Czechoslovakia, Yugoslavia, Belgium, Turkey, Switzerland and the Scandinavian countries, but also overseas.

== Products ==
- televisions
- DVD players
- home cinema
- MP3 players
- MP4 players
- GPS
- air conditioners
- fans
- microwave ovens
- washing machines
- refrigerators
- vacuum cleaners
- dishwashers
- multifunctional ovens
- oil radiators
- TFT computer monitors
