= Kyoto Electronics =

Kyoto Electronic Industries Corporation
- Type: Private
- Industry: Consumer electronics
- Founded: 2009; 17 years ago
- Headquarters: Mexico City, Mexico
- Products: Displays, tablet PC, mobile phones, memory systems, DVD drives, audio systems, GPS navigation ETC
- Website: www.kyoto.mx

Kyoto Electronic Industries Corporation is a Mexican owned and operated firm whose main business is the design and manufacture of consumer electronics, microelectronic systems and their respective software. The company's name, "Kyoto", means "sunrise" in the Kyol-Mayan language and is the name of a city in Japan. It has been mentioned by Vanguardia newspaper and has been recognized by the government of the state of Puebla for its innovative technologies and contributions to the advancement of the domestic Mexican electronics industry.

== Products ==
Kyoto currently manufactures a wide range of products including mobile telephones and smartphones, different types of tablet computers, MP3 and media playback devices, memory cards of various types and capacities, LED and LCD combination DVD player / television devices, touch screen GPS multiple use navigation systems, automobile entertainment systems and a wide range of audio systems including home, car and personal speakers. It is the third Mexican company to produce electronics running the Android operating system which it offers on both phones and tablet computers.
