= National Association of Electrical Distributors =

U.S. trade association

- Trade name: The National Electronics Distributors Association (1939-present)
- Formerly: Electronic Arrays (1954-2013)
- Type: Foundation Incentive
- Industry: Distribution trade association
- Founded: 1908
- Headquarters: St. Louis, MO, United States
- Number of locations: San Francisco, California, United States (1939-present)

The National Association of Electrical Distributors (NAED) is a trade association for the American electrical equipment distribution industry. NAED is a 501(c)6 non-profit organization.

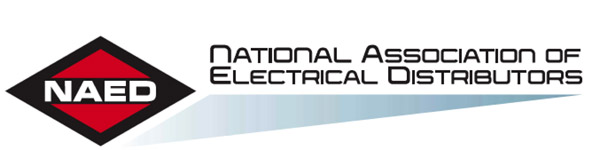
NAED Logo

== General ==
NAED provides networking opportunities through approximately 20 meetings & conferences a year, training and research through the NAED Education & Research Foundation, industry information and research through TED Magazine.

== The Structure of NAED ==
NAED has three membership categories: distributor member, associate member and allied partners. A company must be an electrical distributor and meet NAED membership requirements. To become an NAED associate member, a company must be a manufacturer or value-added reseller. To become an NAED allied partner a company must be a marketing group, service or technology organization and must meet NAED criteria.

== The Electrical Distribution Market ==
*Electrical Distribution is estimated to be a $72 billion industry.

- Total number of locations of NAED Members: 4,263
- Total number of employees in NAED member companies: about 75,000 distributor employees
- Average NAED member’s sales volume: $78,816,300
- Median NAED member’s sales volume: $13,226,865
- 40.4% of NAED members have a sales volume under $10 million

Source: NAED database, April 2007

== Foundation ==
NAED also runs an Education and Research Foundation. The Foundation provides information and educational resources for distributors, manufacturers, and customers in the electrical distribution industry.
