= Lanix =

Mexican computer and phone manufacturer

- Type: Private Company
- Founded: 1990; 36 years ago
- Headquarters: Hermosillo, Mexico (production facility/headquarters); Mexico City, Mexico (commercial and marketing office)
- Area served: Latin America
- Products: Smartphones; Laptops; Tablets; Computers
- Number of employees: 1,000 (Mexico only)
- Website: lanix.com

Lanix Internacional, S.A. de C.V. is a multinational computer and mobile phone manufacturer company based in Hermosillo, Mexico. Lanix primarily markets and sells its products in Mexico and the Latin American export market.

== History ==
Lanix was founded in Hermosillo, Mexico in 1990, and released its first computer, the PC 286 the same year. Throughout the 1990s Lanix expanded into the development and production of more sophisticated electronics components such as optical drives, servers, memory drives and flash memory. In 2002 Lanix opened its first factory outside of Mexico in Santiago, Chile to cater to the South American market.

By 2006 Lanix had gained a market share of 5% of Mexico's electronics market and began diversifying its product line to include LCD televisions and monitors and in 2007 began manufacturing mobile phones. Currently Lanix offers products in the consumer, professional and government markets throughout Latin America.

In 2010 Lanix announced an ambitious plan to gain market share in the Latin American computer market and expanded operations to include every country in Latin America

Lanix has production facilities at its original headquarters in Hermosillo, Mexico, and international facilities in Santiago, Chile, and Bogotá, Colombia.

At the 2009 Intel Solutions Summit hosted by Intel, Lanix won an award in the "mobile solution" category.

In March 2011, Lanix began offering a system where buyers can custom build their own computer, choosing different types of chipsets, memory, and other components.

In 2012 Lanix expanded its product portfolio by integrating its first Smartphone, Ilium S100, and positioned itself as one of the bestselling brands in the Mexican market.

In 2015 announces the first smartphone with Windows Phone of the company.

In June 2017 Lanix image is renewed by updating its logo, launching new high-end smartphones, and updating its webpage.

== Products ==
As of 2010, Lanix manufactures desktops, laptops, tablets, servers, netbooks, monitors, optical disc drives, smartphones flash memory and random-access memory.

As of 2010, it made one of the most powerful production Windows desktops in the world, the Lanix Titan Magnum Extreme.

=== Smartphones and tablet computers ===
In 2007, Lanix announced a mobile division specializing in developing smartphones and tablets. In 2010, it showed a smartphone named the Illium running the Android operating system. Lanix smartphones are offered by Telcel, a subsidiary of América Móvil.

In 2010, Lanix unveiled a tablet computer named the W10 running Windows 7. An Android version will be available through Telcel.

In 2017, Lanix announces its new portfolio of innovative smartphones with competitive features in the current market.

Name	Operating System	Processor	RAM Memory	Storage
=== Smartphones ===
L1400	Android 7.1.1	Qualcomm Snapdragon 430 8-core a 1.4 GHz	3 GB	64 GB
Alpha950	Android 7.1.2	Qualcomm MSM8917 Quad-Core a 1.4 GHz	2 GB	16 GB
L1120	Android 7.0	Mediatek Quad-Core a 1.3 GHz	2 GB	16 GB
L920	Android 7.0	Mediatek Quad-Core a 1.3 GHz	2 GB	16 GB
L620	Android 7.0	Mediatek Quad-Core a 1.3 GHz	1 GB	16 GB
LT520	Android 7.0	Mediatek Quad-Core a 1.1 GHz	1 GB	8 GB
X520	Android 7.0	Mediatek Quad-Core a 1.3 GHz	1 GB	8 GB
L910	Android 6.0	Mediatek Quad-Core a 1.3 GHz	2 GB	16 GB
L610	Android 6.0	Qualcomm Quad-Core a 1.1 GHz	1 GB	16 GB
X710	Android 6.0	Mediatek Quad-Core a 1.3 GHz	1 GB	16 GB
X510	Android 6.0	Mediatek Quad-Core a 1.3 GHz	1 GB	8 GB
LT510	Android 6.0	Mediatek Quad-Core a 1 GHz	1 GB	8 GB
X220	Android 6.0	Mediatek Quad-Core a 1.2 GHz	1 GB	8 GB
X120	Android 6.0	Spreadtrum Quad-Core a 1.3 GHz	512 MB	4 GB
L1100	Android 5.1	Mediatek Quad-Core a 1.5 GHz	2 GB	32 GB
L1200	Android 5.1	Mediatek Octa-Core a 1.3 GHz	2 GB	16 GB
L1050	Android 5.1	Qualcomm Quad-Core a 1.2 GHz	1 GB	16 GB
L200	Android 5.1	Mediatek Quad-Core a 1 GHz	1 GB	8 GB
X210	Android 5.1	Mediatek Quad-Core a 1.3 GHz	512 MB	8 GB
X110	Android 4.4	Mediatek Dual-Core a 1 GHz	512 MB	4 GB
U100	Proprietary	Chipset SC6531D	64 mb	64 mb
=== Laptops ===
Neuron G6	Windows 10 Pro	Intel Core i3 6100U a 2.30 GHz	4 GB	1 TB
Neuron V	Windows 10 Pro	Intel Pentium N3710 hasta 2.56 GHz	8 GB	500 GB
Neuron A	Windows 10 Pro	Intel Celeron N3050 hasta 2.16 GHz	4 GB	500 GB
Neuron Flex	Windows 10 Pro	Intel Celeron N3050 hasta 2.16 GHz	2 GB	500 GB
=== Tablets ===
Ilium E8	Android 7.0	Qualcomm Snapdragon 410 Quad-Core a 1.2 GHz	1 GB	16 GB
Ilium I7	Android 6.0	Intel Atom a 1.1 GHz	1 GB	8 GB
T7X	Android 5.1	Mediatek Quad-Core a 1.3 GHz	512 MB	8 GB
L8	Android 4.4	Qualcomm Snapdragon 410 Quad-Core a 1.2 GHz	1 GB	16 GB
=== Desktop ===
Titan HX	Windows 10 Pro	Intel Core i5 6400 a 2.7 GHz	4 GB	1 TB
Titan	Windows 10 Pro	Intel Core i5 6400 a 2.3 GHz	4 GB	1 TB
Corp	Windows 10 Pro	AMD A5 a 2.4 GHz	4 GB	500 GB
Corp mini	Windows 10 Pro	Intel Celeron N3050 hasta 2.16 GHz	2 GB	120 GB
=== All In One ===
AIO 215 Touch	Windows 10 Pro	Intel Pentium G3260 a 3.30 GHz	4 GB	500 GB
AIO 215	Windows 10 Pro	Intel Pentium G3260 a 3.30 GHz	4 GB	500 GB

== Mexican government contracts ==
Lanix has won several major contracts to provide electronics to government entities in Mexico which has been a key part of the company's success including a contract from the Mexican Secretariat of Public Education to supply 16,000 classrooms across Mexico with computers.
