= Zonda Telecom =

Mexican mobile-phone manufacturer

- Company type: Private
- Industry: Electronics; Telecommunications
- Founded: 1968; 58 years ago in Guadalajara
- Headquarters: Guadalajara, Jalisco, Mexico
- Products: Mobile phones
- Services: Design, Manufacturing, Research & Development
- Website: www.zondatelecom.com

Zonda Telecom is a Mexican telecommunications company founded in Guadalajara, Jalisco, in 1968 as a television manufacturer.

This company has several manufacturing plants in the Guadalajara Metropolitan Area, which manufacture its own products as well as electronic products for other companies. This makes Zonda an OEM.

In 2002, Zonda Telecom entered the mobile phone market becoming the first Mexican company to design its own Mobile Phones. Zonda has also produced communications systems and communication subsystems and for the Mexican military.

== Models ==
Below is a partial list of some of Zonda Telecoms mobile phone models.

Model Name	Operating system	SIM	Display	Weight	Battery	Keyboard	Web	Camera	Network	Image
ZMTN 815	Windows Phone 7/ZONDA OS 3.5	Dual	2.4" QVGA	130 gr	N/A	Physical Qwerty	Full HTML	4.5 megapixel	GSM/GPRS/EDGE 850/900/1800/1900 and UMTS/HSPA 800/850/1900/2100 & Bluetooth	
ZMCK 740	Android 2.3/ZONDA OS 3.6	Dual	2.4" QVGA	130 gr	N/A	Physical Qwerty	Full HTML	4.5 megapixel	GSM/GPRS/EDGE 850/900/1800/1900 and UMTS/HSPA 800/850/1900/2100 & Bluetooth	
ZMCK 870	Android 2.2/ZONDA OS 3.5	Dual	2.4" QVGA	139 gr	N/A	Physical Qwerty	Full HTML	4.5 megapixel	GSM/GPRS/EDGE 850/900/1800/1900 and UMTS/HSPA 800/850/1900/2100 & Bluetooth	
ZMTF TV20	Android 1.6/ZONDA OS 3.0	Dual	2.5" QVGA Capacitive	N/A	N/A	Touch Keyboard	Full HTML	4.2	GSM850/1900	
ZMAV 8000	Android 1.6/ZONDA OS 3.0	Dual	2.4" QVGA Capacitive	115 gr	N/A	Touch Keyboard	Full HTML	3.2 LED Flash	GSM850/1900 & Bluetooth	
ZMFD 130	Claro Software	Single	1.2" TFT	62 gr	70-hour standby 2 hours talk time	none	No	none	GSM850/1900	
ZMTM 615	ZONDA OS 2.7	Single	1.4" LCD	63 gr	N/A	none	Opera Mobile	2.8	GSM850/1900	
ZMTM 610	ZONDA OS 2.7	Single	1.4" LCD	67 gr	N/A	none	Opera Mobile	2.1	GSM850/1900	
ZMTN 600	ZONDA OS 2.5	Single	1.4" LCD	57 gr	N/A	none	Opera Mobile	none	GSM850/1900	

== See also ==
- Intex Technologies
