= Snowa =

Iranian appliance manufacturer

- Type: Joint-stock company
- Industry: Home appliances
- Founded: 2006
- Headquarters: Isfahan, Iran
- Key people: CEO:Mohammad Reza Diani
- Products: TVs, heaters, air-conditioners, vacuum cleaners, home appliances and small appliances
- Parent: Entekhab Group
- Website: www.snowa.ir

Snowa is an Iranian appliance manufacturer based in Isfahan, Iran that operates under the ownership of the Entekhab Industrial Group. Snowa was established in 2005 in an area of 25,000 square meters in Murche Khort, Isfahan producing various types of appliances. The company now has products ranging from embedded gas stoves (built-in) hob, range hoods, microwaves, kitchen sinks, refrigerators, washing machines, smart TVs, vacuum cleaners and oven and gas stove stands (free stand).

== Name ==
Snowa is the acronym of the company name, whose original name was "Elements of the Iranian New Structure". The company is the sub-group of Entekhab Group.

== History ==
Snowa was first built in 2005 in an area of 25,000 square meters in Murche Khort, Isfahan.

== Brand ==
In 2015, the group decided to do rebranding of Snowa and held a celebration launching new Snowa logo, slogan and identity. in order to introduce and launch the refreshed brand. Previous Snowa organizational logo and color were red, but it is red, blue and green since 2015. Also two fantasy characters as well as blue and green colors accompany this logo. Doctor Hassan Namak Doust, Younes Shekar Khah and Abdullah Givian contributed to brand renewal project of Snowa.

== Certificates ==
- IMS Integrated Management System Certifications including International certifications: (ISO 9001, ISO 14001, OHSAS 18001)
- CE Marking certification in 2011 in order to export gas oven to Europe
- B.V certificate to export gas oven to Iraq and other countries in the region
- Top 100 Iranian brands, in the tenth National Festival of Champions of Technology in 2014
- Award and Statuette of Festival of "Popular Consumers Brands" in two refrigerator and TV groups in 2014
