= Asko Appliances =

Swedish appliance manufacturer

Asko Appliances AB
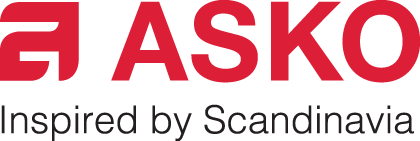
- Industry: Domestic appliances, commercial appliances
- Founded: Vara, Sweden (1950; 76 years ago)
- Headquarters: Sweden
- Area served: Worldwide
- Products: Dishwashers; Ovens; Cooktops; Refrigerators; Washing machines; Dryers
- Parent: Gorenje
- Website: asko.com

Asko Appliances AB is a household-appliance producer, a brand of the Slovenian Gorenje Group, which is a subsidiary of Chinese major appliances manufacturer Hisense. It was founded in Jung in Vara Municipality in Västergötland, Sweden. Manufacturing is in Slovenia. Management and development are in Lidköping, Sweden and the brand uses the tag line "Inspired by Scandinavia." The products are sold in Sweden under the brands Cylinda and Asko. In North America, Asko imports only dishwashers and laundry appliances.

== History ==
The company was established in 1950 by Karl-Erik Andersson, whose first invention was a washing machine. The company started producing a fully automatic front-loading washing machine and a compact dishwasher in 1965, and started exporting their products in 1967. The original name was Junga Verkstäder, but after having been acquired by Asea in 1978, the name was changed to Asea Cylinda, later becoming ABB Cylinda after the merger of Asea with the Swiss Brown Boveri Corporation to form ABB. In 1984, they introduced the washing machines as we know of today: no springs, four shock absorbers and a door that directly connects to the outer drum, the latter being a unique design for domestic front loaders. The top loaders (only sold in Europe) also have four shock absorbers and no springs. The company was acquired by Finnish furniture manufacturer Asko (founded by Aukusti Heikki Asko-Avonius) in 1988. The name was also changed to Asko ASEA. Somewhere around 1992, ASEA was dropped from the name and it became Asko. Asko Appliances was acquired by the Italian Antonio Merloni Group in 2000.

With the acquisition of Asko Appliances the ownership of the Cylinda brand was kept within the corporate group of Asea, but in 1999 the name was changed from Asea Skandia to Elektroskandia. In 2008, Elektroskandia was acquired by the international company Sonepar. In July 2010 Asko Appliances was acquired by Slovenian Gorenje Group. Gorenje transferred production of all Asko appliances from Sweden to Slovenia in 2013. In June 2018, Chinese company Hisense acquired 95% majority in Gorenje Group. In February 2013, the washing machine and dryer production was moved to Velenje, Slovenia, and in July 2013 the dishwasher production was also moved. Management and development are in Lidköping, Sweden. In November 2022, Cylinda washing machines made in Turkey are sold.

Cylinda is still owned by Elektroskandia Sverige AB.

In the UK, the brand was removed from store shelves around 2018, and reintroduced in 2021 under the name KitchenEx. The brand was also introduced in Spain and Portugal in 2021, but its name ('asco' means 'disgust' in Spanish) made it an uncertain shot to market in those regions. Tom Aikens became Asko's brand ambassador in 2024.

== Releases ==
- 2003 50-liter machines refreshed with DC brushless motors and 1800 RPM
- 2006 50-liter machines final refresh, new control panel, 1800 RPM model dropped, drum spider material changed from Stainless Steel to cast Aluminium due to tolerance issues on high spin speed machines, bearing sealing cartridge changed accordingly
- 2007 New generation of washing machines launched with a full-width control panel with the detergent dispenser below it and 2000RPM spin. Models with the drop-down door are axed
- 2013 Production of ASKO washing machines moves to Slovenia alongside a redesigned drum with hourglass-shaped paddles called the Active Drum
- 2017 New generation of washing machines and tumble dryers launched with the Classic, Logic, and Style ranges. New features include a centrally-placed dial, a pull-open door, a choice of wash modes and a return to a regular detergent drawer. Style models feature a TFT-colour display, Pro Wash recirculation spray, Auto Dose, Steam Refresh program, and 1800RPM spin
