= Pharmadule =

Pharmadule was a Swedish company, specialized in design and construction of modular pharmaceutical manufacturing facilities in the same fashion as modular homes nowadays are being built. The unique idea came from its founder, Clas Wallenborg, in 1986 as a result of several troublesome facility constructions abroad for Pharmacia.

== Pharmadule Emtunga AB ==
In July 2001, Pharmadule AB officially merged with Emtunga International AB. The merger completed the two companies long-term relationship. Emtunga had been Pharmadule's exclusive manufacturer of modular pharmaceutical plants and the companies had operated extremely close during a period of fifteen years. In 2001 Flexenclosure is made a separate division of Pharmadule Emtunga and is now a stand-alone company with its headquarters in Stockholm and corporate hub in Vara.

In December 2003, 3i acquired Pharmadule Emtunga from IDI. Pharmadule Emtunga has 600 employees and conducts operations in Emtunga, Vara, Gothenburg and Stockholm.

== Pharmadule Morimatsu AB ==
Pharmadule Morimatsu is a Swedish company owned by Morimatsu Group since 2011. Pharmadule offers complete modular facilities including process design and engineering, facility design and engineering, fabrication, process installation, project management, commissioning and qualification, validation and regulatory services and process equipment for the pharma, biotech and consumer goods industry.

== Pharmadule OÜ ==
Pharmadule OÜ was established in 2005 as a manufacturing unit for Pharmadule. Pharmadule OÜ delivers modular solutions, skids, equipment and orbital welding services.
