= Emtunga =

Emtunga is a mechanical production company which was founded in 1945 in the village of Emtunga, Sweden by Bertil Gustavsson as Emtunga Mekaniska Verkstad AB, and which later developed into a group of companies. In the early days he supplied local farmers with equipment such as pressure vessels and tanks. The first living-quarter module produced by Emtunga was delivered to a North Sea oil rig in 1974. After Gustavsson's retirement in 1976, his two sons managed the business and turned its activities towards the oil and gas industry. Between 1976 and 1984, all activities were focused on this sector. To decrease its dependency on the volatile oil and gas industry, Emtunga decided to enter into the expanding telecom sector and delivered the first telecom modules 1983 to Ericsson. In 1986 Emtunga delivered its first pharmaceutical modules for Pharmadule.

== Emtunga International AB ==
In 1998 Emtunga is acquired by IDI (Industrial Development & Investment AB) and the company name is changed to Emtunga International AB.

== Pharmadule Emtunga AB ==
In July 2001, Pharmadule AB officially merged with Emtunga International AB. The merger completed the two companies long-term relationship. Emtunga had been Pharmadule's exclusive manufacturer of modular pharmaceutical plants and the companies had operated extremely close during a period of fifteen years. In 2001 Flexenclosure is made a separate division of Pharmadule Emtunga and is now a stand-alone company based in Lidköping. In December 2003, 3i acquires Pharmadule Emtunga from IDI. Pharmadule Emtunga has 600 employees and conducts operations in Emtunga, Vara, Gothenburg and Stockholm.

== Emtunga Offshore AB ==
On September 1, 2007, Pharmadule Emtunga AB has established its two operating divisions into two separate companies: Pharmadule AB and Emtunga Offshore AB.

In October 2008 Emtunga Offshore AB applies for a company reconstruction.

Emtunga Offshore AB decided on December 17, 2008 to apply for bankruptcy. This is due to the company’s largest customer – MPF Corp. Ltd – having become insolvent and not being able to fulfill its commitments to Emtunga Offshore, amounting to approximately 100,000,000 SEK as well as the 2008 financial crisis. Emtunga Offshore has 140 employees in Arendal, Gothenburg and Emtunga, Vara.

== Leirvik Emtunga AB ==
In February 2009 Norska Leirvik MT announced the foundation of the 100% owned Company, LEIRVIK Emtunga AB. LEIRVIK Emtunga will fabricate modular steel living quarters for international customers all over the world.

== Apply Leirvik Emtunga AB ==
In November 2009 LEIRVIK Emtunga LQ AB changed its name to Apply Leirvik Emtunga AB.
