= Hisense =

Chinese multinational electronics company

Hisense Group Co., Ltd.
- Logo since 2012

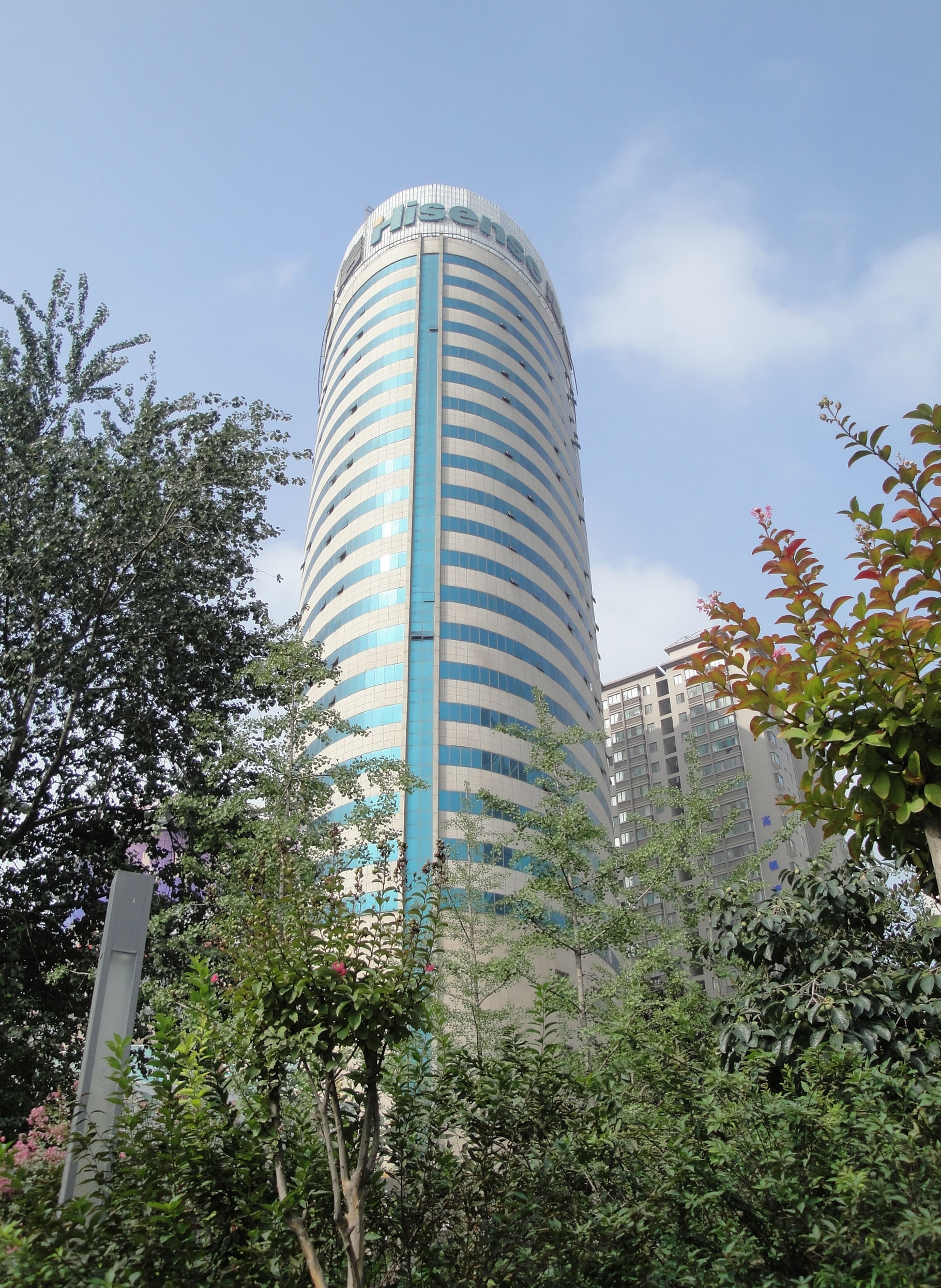
- Headquarters in Qingdao, Shandong
- Native name: 海信有限公司
- Romanized name: Hǎixìn Yǒuxiàn Gōngsī
- Type: Public company
- Traded as: SSE: 600060; SEHK: 921; SZSE: 000921
- Industry: Electronics; Home appliances
- Predecessor: Qingdao No. 2 Radio Factory
- Founded: September 1969; 57 years ago (as Qingdao No. 2 Radio Factory); March 1993; 33 years ago (as Hisense)
- Headquarters: Qingdao, Shandong, China
- Area served: Worldwide
- Products: Mobile phones; Televisions; Air conditioners; Refrigerators; Washing machines; Ovens
- Revenue: US$12.169 billion (2023)
- Operating income: US$288.59 million (2018)
- Net income: US$1.14 billion (2019)
- Owner: Qingdao Hisense Electric Holdings Co., Ltd. (29.9%)
- Subsidiaries: 54 companies and offices
- Website: global.hisense.com

Hisense
- Chinese: 海信
- Traditional Chinese: 海信
- Simplified Chinese: 海信
Transcriptions
Standard Mandarin
- Hanyu Pinyin: Hǎixìn
- Tongyong Pinyin: Hǎisìn
- Yale Romanization: Hǎisyìn
- IPA: ha:i xih-:n
Yue: Cantonese
- Yale Romanization: hai sahn
- Jyutping: haih4 san1
- IPA: xa:i-h sa-h:n
Southern Min
- Hokkien POJ: Hayī-xihn
- Tâi-lô: Haixan
- Teochew Peng'im: Hāixhín

Hisense Group Co., Ltd. is a Chinese multinational major appliance and electronics manufacturer headquartered in Qingdao, Shandong, China. Television sets are one of its principal products. In the first quarter of 2026, Hisense accounted for 13% of global television shipments, behind Samsung and TCL, according to Counterpoint Research. Hisense also operates as an original equipment manufacturer (OEM), producing some goods that are sold under brands other than Hisense.

Two major subsidiaries of Hisense Group are publicly listed: Hisense Visual Technology (SSE: 600060) and Hisense Home Appliances Group (SEHK: 921, SZSE: 000921).

== History ==
Qingdao Number 2 Radio Factory, the predecessor of Hisense Group, was established in September 1969. The factory initially produced radios, including sets sold under the Red Lantern brand, before beginning experimental production of black-and-white televisions. Three employees received television-production training at the Tianjin 712 factory, and the Qingdao factory had produced 82 televisions by 1971. It developed transistor television sets by 1975. A CJD18 television model was produced in 1978.

In 1979, Qingdao Number 2 Radio Factory was merged with three other local factories to form Qingdao General Television Factory. The company expanded its television manufacturing during the 1980s, including through technology and equipment obtained from foreign manufacturers.

In 1992, Zhou Houjian became head of the television factory, and Hisense Group was established in 1994. Hisense Electrical Appliance Share Holding Company, subsequently known as Hisense Electrical Co., was listed on the Shanghai Stock Exchange in April 1997. During the 1990s, the group expanded through acquisitions and had acquired ten financially troubled enterprises by 1998. It also expanded beyond televisions into household appliances, computers and telecommunications.

Hisense obtained technology from a number of foreign companies, including Matsushita, Hitachi, Lucent, NEC, Sanyo, Toshiba and Qualcomm. In 2005, the company developed the HiView digital video-processing chip for television sets.

At the 2013 Consumer Electronics Show, Hisense demonstrated a transparent 3D television.

In July 2015, Hisense acquired Sharp's television manufacturing facility in Mexico for $23.7 million and obtained rights to use the Sharp brand on televisions in North and South America.

In November 2017, Hisense agreed to acquire a 95% stake in Toshiba Visual Solutions for approximately US$113 million. In 2018, Hisense became the majority shareholder of Slovenian appliance manufacturer Gorenje, increasing its stake to approximately 95.4%.

In May 2022, Hisense introduced its first television using Amazon's Fire TV platform, a 4K model produced as part of its U6 television range.

== Products and services ==
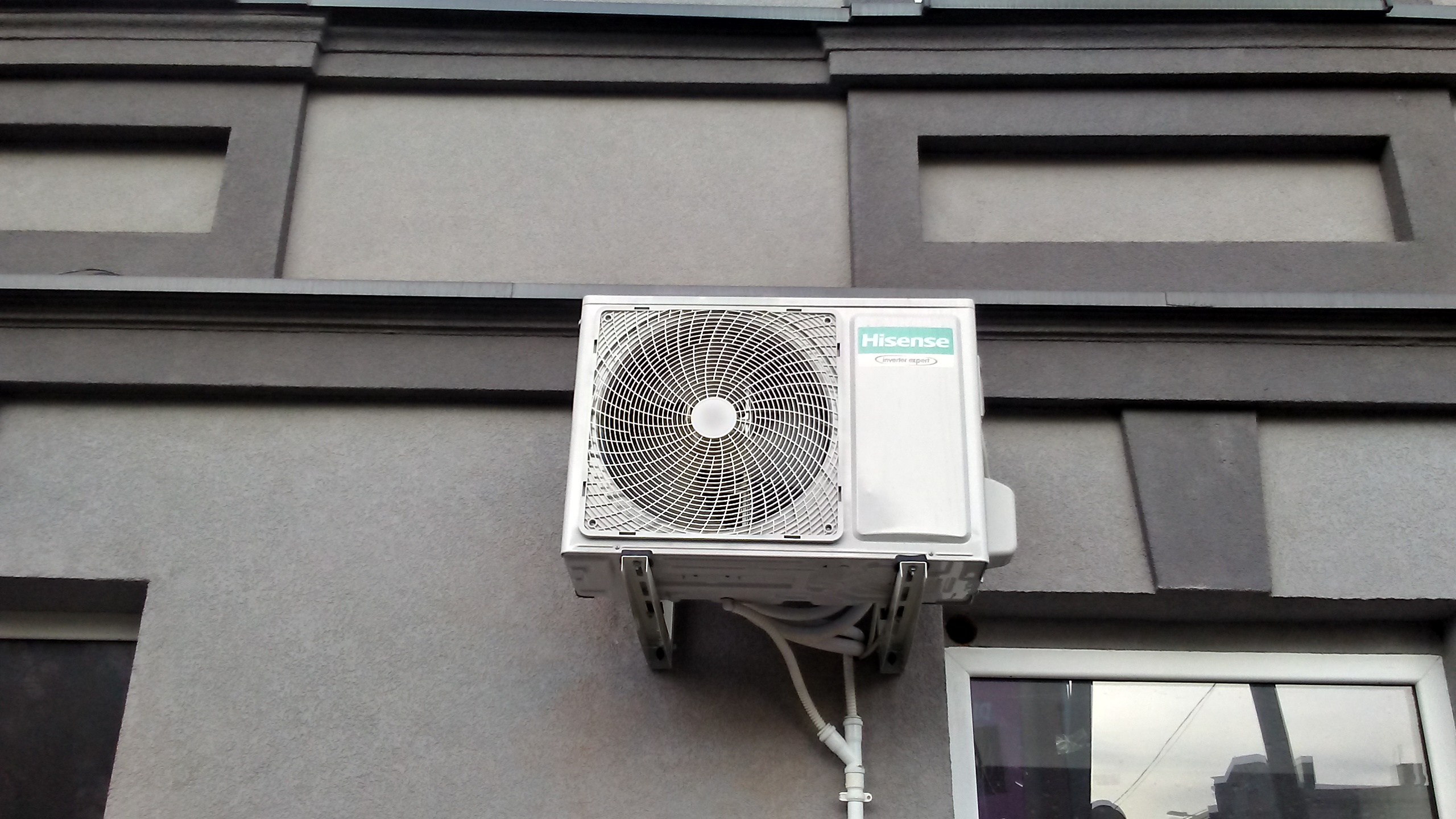
A Hisense air conditioner in Tomaszów Mazowiecki, Poland

Hisense manufactures white goods, televisions, set-top boxes, digital TV broadcasting equipment, mobile devices (including phones), wireless modules, wireless PC cards, optical components, personal computers (desktops and laptops), projectors and monitors, as well as POS solutions. In 2018, Hisense released its first OLED television, and its first 8K television was released in 2021. In the early 2020s, the company has expanded into the projector market. At the 2023 CES, Hisense also presented several gaming monitors.

Hisense has developed mobile devices, including regular Android-based smartphones and tablets, as well as Android smartphones with e-ink displays, and other related portable devices, marketed as e-ink music players and e-readers. Hisense has created a customized version of Android called Vision. In some regions (e.g. in Mexico and South Africa), Hisense is a major mobile phone manufacturer, primarily offering budget or mid-tier devices. In Indonesia, the company's mobile phones were largely offered under Smartfren's Andromax brand. In 2019, Hisense phones were made available in Serbia.

Although Hisense's core business are budget TVs, the company has a broad market coverage, offering devices in all price ranges. Particularly since the 2020s, the company has been offering high-end television models in large screen sizes, being the largest manufacturer of 100-inch TVs by shipment as of 2023. As of 2023, Hisense's flagship TV line is the UX series of mini LED TVs, which are positioned above the company's OLED models.

Hisense retails products under several brand names, including Hisense, Toshiba, Gorenje, Sharp, Kelon, Hitachi, Asko and Ronshen.

=== VIDAA ===
VIDAA OS
- Version of the VIDAA operating system
- Developer: V America Operations Inc.
- Written in: C, C++, HTML5, JavaScript
- Working state: Current
- Source model: Closed-source
- Initial release: VIDAA U1 (2014)
- Latest release: VIDAA 9 (2026)
- Marketing target: Smart TVs
- Available in: 28 languages
- Supported platforms: Hisense, Toshiba, Polytron, Loewe smart TVs, and others
- Official website: www.v-home.com

VIDAA is a Linux-based smart TV operating system developed by V America Operations Inc., a subsidiary of Hisense. Introduced in 2014, VIDAA is designed to provide an integrated platform for accessing multimedia content, including streaming services, live TV, and applications, on smart televisions. It is implemented on a range of smart TVs produced by manufacturers such as Hisense, Toshiba, Polytron, and Loewe. The operating system is able to aggregate content from various sources, allowing users to access content from different services from a unified platform. VIDAA has also been noted for its responsive interface and operating speed; a 2025 comparative test by connect ranked it first overall among five smart TV platforms tested.

The company behind VIDAA adopted the name V as part of a corporate rebranding in 2026. This change in corporate identity is distinct from the VIDAA operating system itself, which remains the subject of this article.

As of 2023, VIDAA reportedly operated on over 30 million connected devices worldwide. In 2024, VIDAA was the second most installed smart TV operating system behind Tizen.

VIDAA's partners include over 400 content providers, including services such as Netflix, YouTube, Amazon Prime Video, Viu, iQIYI, DAZN, iWant, HBO Max, Disney+, Viaplay, Crunchyroll.

== Projector ==
Hisense entered the projector market in the mid-2010s. Popular models include the PX1-Pro and L9G, known for 4K UHD, HDR support, and advanced laser technology, offering vibrant visuals and excellent home cinema performance.

Here is a list of Hisense projectors available in 2024:

- Hisense C2 Pro
- Hisense PL2
- Hisense C2 Ultra
- Hisense PX3-PRO

Leica also provides a projector using Vidaa :

- Leica Cine Play 1 based on Hisense C2 Ultra with improved optical bloc from Leica

== Brands ==
Hisense sells under multiple brand names:

- Fridgemaster: A British fridge brand gained in 2012.
- Gorenje: Acquired 100% of shares in 2019 of the Slovenian Gorenje.
- Combine: Affixed to no frills air conditioners and refrigerators, Combine-branded products may be purchased by Chinese farmers.
- Hisense-Hitachi: A brand of commercial air-conditioners designed and manufactured by a joint venture of Hisense and Hitachi.
- Hisense Kelon: A high-end brand under Hisense can be found on refrigerators and air-conditioners.
- Ronshen: High quality, middle-end air conditioners and refrigerators retail under this brand name.
- Savor: A home appliance brand, from the eponymous Modern English word.
- Toshiba Regza: On 15 November 2017, Hisense reached a $114 million deal to acquire a 95% stake of Toshiba Visual Solutions. It continues to run as an independent-run subsidiary of Hisense.

=== Sharp dispute ===
In 2015, Hisense received a five-year license to use the Sharp brand on televisions in the America. Hisense also bought a Sharp factory in Mexico.

In June 2017, Hisense was sued by Sharp under its new owner Foxconn, seeking to have the license agreement halted. Sharp accused Hisense of damaging its brand equity by utilizing its trademarks on products it deemed to be "shoddily manufactured", including those that it believed to have violated U.S. safety standards for electromagnetic radiation, and deceptive advertising of their quality. Hisense denied it engaged in these practices, and stated that it planned to defend itself in court and "will continue to manufacture and sell quality televisions under the Sharp licensed brands."

In February 2018, Sharp dropped the lawsuit. In May 2019, a mutual agreement was reached and finalized in which Sharp will regain the legal trademark rights from Hisense.

== Operations ==
=== Subsidiaries ===
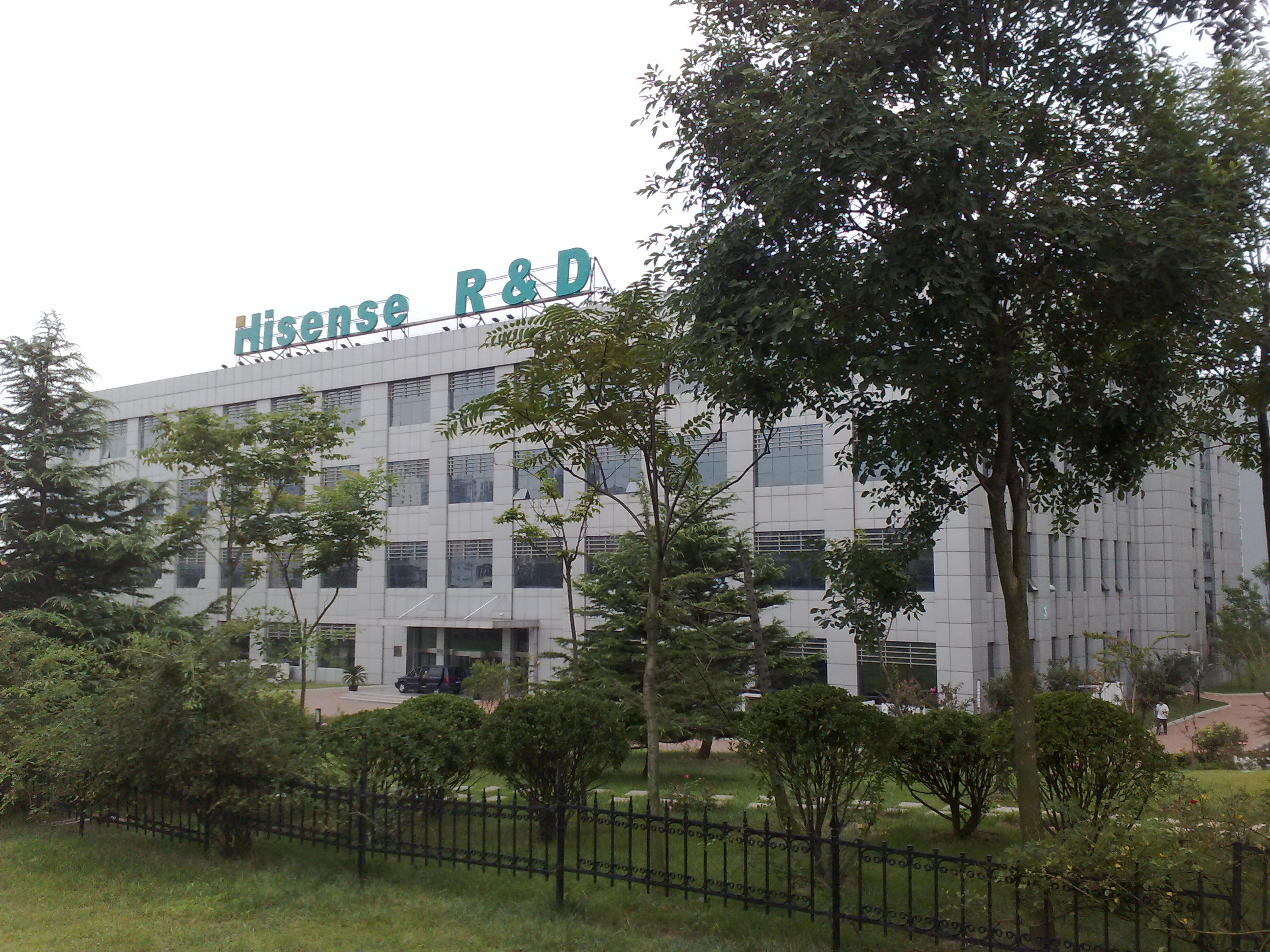
Hisense R&D centre in Qingdao, China

Hisense owns over 40 subsidiaries, both inside and outside China.

Hisense and Hitachi established Hisense-Hitachi Air-conditioning System Co Ltd in 2003. It designs, manufactures and markets its products, which include commercial and household central air-conditioning systems, in China. They sell Hisense-Hitachi products in Japan. It operates a commercial air-con production facility in the Hisense Information Industrial Park.

Hisense Air Conditioning Co Ltd is a subsidiary set up in the Hisense Pingdu Home Appliance Industrial Park in Pingdu, China, in 1996 to produce air-conditioners using frequency conversion air-conditioner technology purchased from Sanyo.

Hisense Australia Pty Ltd is headquartered in Qingdao, China. Hisense's Australian subsidiary helps distribute Hisense products.

Hisense (Beijing) Electric Co Ltd took over a modern refrigerator factory near Beijing with the help of the local government after Whirlpool withdrew from the project in 1998. Hisense (Beijing) Electric Co Ltd is now responsible for R&D, production and marketing of refrigerators.

Hisense-Whirlpool (Zhejiang) Electric Appliances Co Ltd is a joint venture between Hisense Kelon and Whirlpool formed in 2008 for the development and production of washing machines and refrigerators, Hisense provides this joint venture with refrigerator know-how and Whirlpool, its washing machine manufacturing expertise. The company operates a plant in Huzhou, Zhejiang province, which manufactures washing machines and large capacity refrigerators.

They created Hisense Export & Import Co Ltd in 1991, this subsidiary is tasked with establishing OEM contracts with foreign companies.

Hisense Hungary Kft is a failed subsidiary established in 2004 as a joint venture with Flextronics. It was in Sárvár, Vas County, Hungary. Hisense Hungary Kft assembled TVs.

Initially, few of the products it manufactured sold under the Hisense brand name, and they focused on OEM products instead. As of 2009, the television plant has been shut down because of falling orders, and Hisense Hungary Kft operates with a staff of 13.

In 2001, Hisense (Shandong) Information Technology Co Ltd created a subsidiary in Jinan, Shandong province, and this subsidiary handles infrastructure-use IT. It develops and markets security technology and intelligent traffic control products and their software.

Hisense Kelon Electrical Holdings Ltd is listed on two stock exchanges. Hisense Kelon is a large Hisense subsidiary.

Hisense Intelligent Commercial Equipment Co Ltd was founded in 1989, this subsidiary manufactures, designs, markets and services POS terminal, electronic cash registers and other specialized peripheral equipment for retailing, tax monitoring and finance. It is also responsible for R&D and manufactures at the Hisense Yellow Island Information Product Manufacturing Park.

Hisense Mobile Communications Technology Co Ltd was created in 2005. Hisense Mobile Communications Technology Co Ltd has its roots in the Hisense Mobile Communications Research Institute, an R&D team created in 2000. Holding 233 patents, 64 inventions and 116 software copyrights, its products include mobile handsets, Linux OS smart phones, wireless modules, PC cards and industry customized terminals.

The government of Qingdao erased Hisense Optics Co Ltd's debts and gave its assets to the Hisense Group in 1995. This subsidiary operates a remote control factory, a degaussing coil factory and an accessory parts factory. Products manufactured include remote controls, degaussing coils and injection molded parts. It may also produce or produced optical instruments, cameras and telephones. It operates an injection molding workshop in Nancun town, Qingdao.

Hisense Optoelectronics Technology Co Ltd was created as a joint venture between Hisense, Ligent Photonics Inc, et al. in 2003, this subsidiary develops fibre optic products. Its R&D facilities are in Chicago and Qingdao, and it has a production base in the latter location. It is also responsible for marketing Ligent Photonics Inc products in Asia.

Hisense South Africa Development Enterprise Pty Ltd is the company's first overseas subsidiary. This failed joint venture with South African bank NED had a factory in South Africa that manufactured televisions and home-theatre equipment. It may still be responsible for R&D and distribution to local retail outlets.

Hisense USA Co is a Georgia-based subsidiary responsible for some activities in the US. Hisense USA may distribute products to retailers or establish an R&D centre. Founded in 2000 or 2001, it was initially headquartered in Los Angeles. It may initially have included an R&D facility. As of 2009, it has locations in Gwinnett, Suwanee, and unincorporated Gwinnett County, Georgia.

Hisense and Ligent Photonics Inc. established a joint venture in 2002. This subsidiary designs, develops and fabricates optical components for the telecommunications and data communications industries. Products are designed at its headquarters in St Charles, Illinois, and manufactured in China. This joint venture sells in North America, Europe and the Middle East through a network of sales representatives and in Asia through Hisense Optoelectronics.

Qingdao Hisense Communications Co Ltd is a subsidiary manufactures mobile phones and operates an R&D facility. Established in 2001, it has a technical cooperation effort with Qualcomm and operates a mobile phone production base in a Hisense IT Industrial Park 90 minutes from Qingdao. One of its products, the Hisense C108, is the first mobile phone to use Qualcomm's biomimetic screen technology, Mirasol, which allows it to be easily read in direct sunlight.

Qingdao Hisense Network Technology Co Ltd was established in 2004. This subsidiary grew out of an internal Hisense department, the Information Technology Center, and provides IT consultancy services.

Qingdao Hisense Property Management Co Ltd provides property management services, as well as product design, mold design, pattern making and mold processing and manufacturing, through this subsidiary.

Qingdao Hisense Real Estate Co Ltd was created in 1995. This subsidiary has over 40 completed developments in Shandong province, including residential buildings, apartments, villas, townhouses, office buildings and large industrial parks.

Qingdao Hisense TransTech Co Ltd was founded in October 1998, this subsidiary manufactures and markets electronics for urban traffic, public transport and logistics. Its products include traffic light control systems, traffic signal controllers, comprehensive public security and traffic information platforms, digital traffic violation video processing systems, public transport dispatch systems, the Hisense intelligent vehicular terminal, the Hisense mobile audio-visual intelligent vehicular terminal and electronic stop signs. Its products are marketed under the HiCon, HiECS, HiATMP, and HiDVS brand names.

As of 2005, Hisense Italy, Hisense's Italian office, may manage own-brand (as opposed to OEM) sales.

Wuhu Ecan Motors Co Ltd is a joint venture between Guangdong Kelon (Rongsheng) Co Ltd, Xiwenjin Co Ltd and Luminous Industrial Ltd. This company produces electric motors for the information industry and for office automation. It is in the Wuhu National High-tech and Industry Development Zone.

=== Production bases ===
Hisense owns at least 14 manufacturing parks worldwide and operates several production bases.

Hisense Guangdong Multimedia Industrial Base was put into operation on 28 September 2007. This industrial base produces flat panel TVs and is in the Shunde District of the city of Foshan, Guangdong.

Hisense Industrial Park in South Africa was set up to manufacture televisions and white goods.

Hisense Information Industrial Park was created in 2001 and in Qingdao, Shandong, this industrial park is on 80 hectares of land. Hisense-Hitachi operates a commercial air-conditioning manufacturing facility in the park and from 2007 a LCD TV module production line also calls the park home.

Hisense Pingdu Home Appliance Industrial Park was in Pingdu, Shandong, it is home to Hisense Air Conditioning Co Ltd.

Hisense Yellow Island Information Product Manufacturing Park was encompassing over 200 acres (0.81 km^{2}), Hisense Yellow Island Information Product Manufacturing Park is one of the twelve industrial parks owned by Hisense as of 2009.

Huzhou production base is a Hisense inverter-type/variable-frequency air-conditioner production base is in Huzhou, Zhejiang, and was set up on 8 May 2005. A joint venture between Hisense Air Conditioner Co Ltd and Zhejiang Xianke Air Conditioner Co, it is operated by subsidiary Hisense (Zhejiang) Air Conditioner Co Ltd and comprises a 60,000-square-meter factory and over 200 mu of land.

Hisense Whirlpool (Huzhou) Household Appliances Industrial Park is a production base that manufactures washing machines and refrigerators for a joint venture with Whirlpool is at this Huzhou park. It comprises an 80,000-square-meter factory on 20 hectares of land.

Nanjing Refrigerator Industrial Park is in the Nanjing Xingang Economic and Technological Development Zone of Nanjing, Jiangsu. A refrigerator production base is in this industrial park. The site's factory is 52,000 square meters in size.

Sichuan production base is a Hisense Kelon refrigerator production base with a 36,000-square-meter factory is in Chengdu, Sichuan.

== Partnerships ==
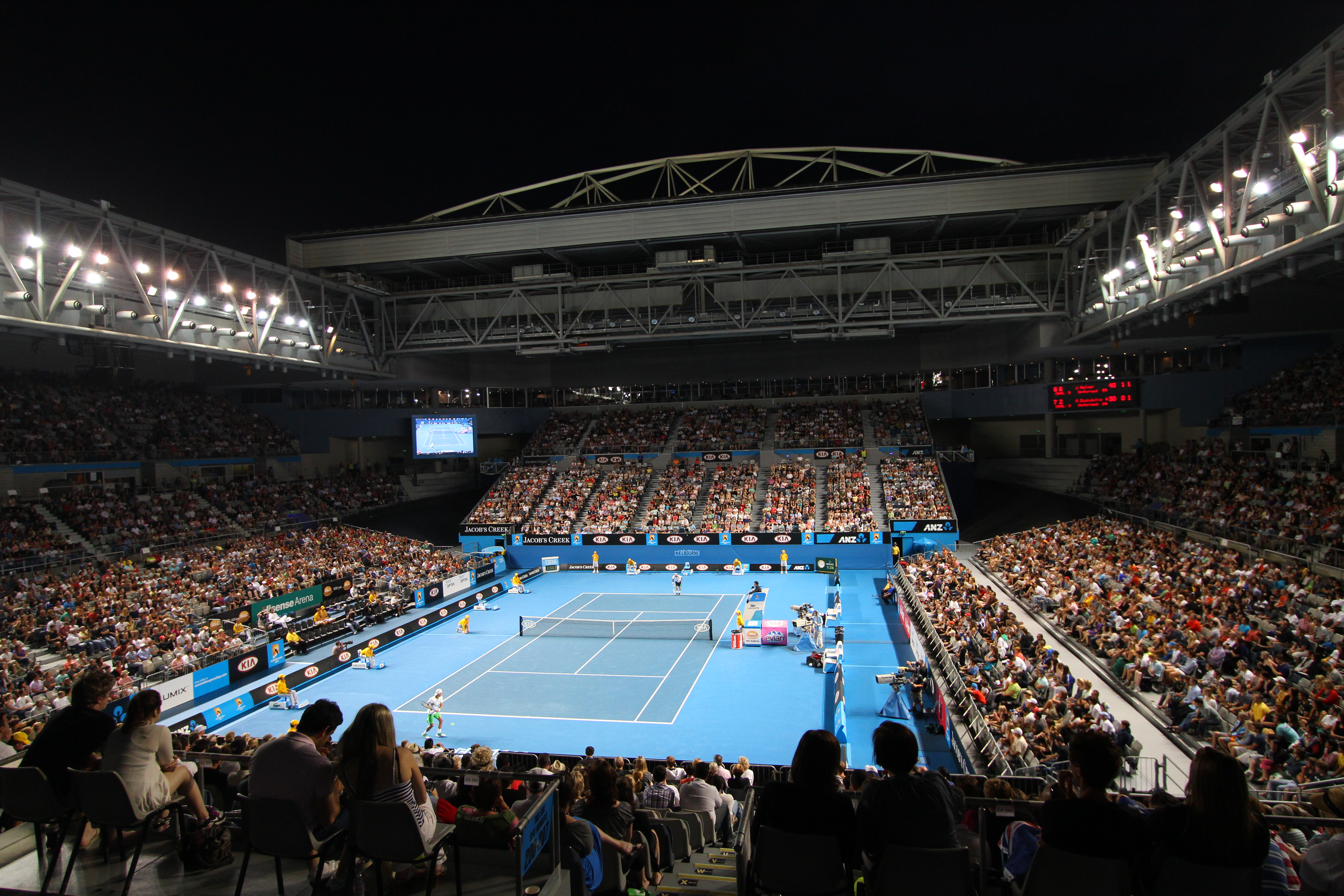
Hisense Arena in Melbourne, Australia

In July 2008, Hisense agreed with Melbourne & Olympic Parks, allowing them six-year naming rights to Hisense Arena, a Melbourne venue for spectator sports such as basketball, netball, dance sports, cycling, gymnastics and tennis. It is the first stadium in the world to be named after a Chinese company. By 2018, the arena had been renamed Melbourne Arena.

In China, Hisense has begun a relationship with Beihang University (Beijing University of Aeronautics and Astronautics) to set up an engineering postgraduate program approved by the Ministry of Education and a collaboration with Peking University to set up an MBA remote education program.

Hisense was the global partner for the Lotus F1 team in 2014 and Infiniti Red Bull Racing team from 2015 to 2017.

Hisense was the main sponsor of the UEFA Euro 2016 and subsequently expanded their deal with the Union of European Football Associations (UEFA) to include all National Team Football competitions ahead of the UEFA Euro 2020, with the current deal set to expire in 2026.

Hisense has become an official sponsor of the FIFA World Cup, starting in the 2018 tournament in Russia and continuing to the next tournament in Qatar. Hisense also engages in various global marketing and advertising activities for both the 2017 FIFA Confederations Cup and the 2018 FIFA World Cup.

On 27 July 2017, Hisense and Aston Villa F.C. announced a strategic partnership.

In March 2020, Hisense announced they had entered a three-year agreement to be a major sponsor of the National Rugby League (NRL), in a deal that spans the NRL Telstra Premiership, State of Origin series, and NRL TV. Hisense has also been given the naming rights to Thursday Night Football as part of the agreement.

In August 2024, Hisense added a display preset on selected TV models tailored for the game Black Myth: Wukong.

On 30 October 2024, Hisense has been announced as the first official partner for the 2025 FIFA Club World Cup.

In December 2024, Hisense partnered with Epack Durable with 26% financial stake.

== Lawsuits ==
In December 2025, Texas Attorney General Ken Paxton filed a lawsuit against Hisense and four other smart TV manufacturers, alleging that the companies were illegally "spying on Texans by secretly recording what consumers watch in their own homes" using automated content recognition (ACR) technology. A Texas judge subsequently issued a restraining order blocking the company from gathering or sharing viewer data from residents in the state.

== See also ==
- TCL Technology
