= Vara Concert Hall =

Swedish concert hall

Coordinates: 58°15′56.35″N 12°57′58.75″E

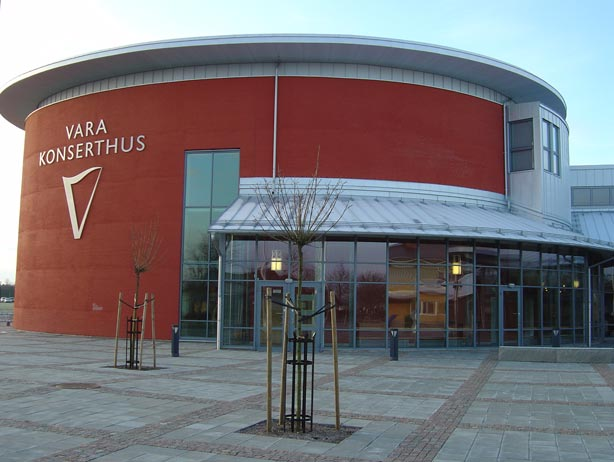
Vara Concert Hall

Vara Concert Hall (Vara konserthus) is a concert hall at Vara in Västra Götaland County, Sweden. The concert hall was designed by architect Blake J McConahy and was inaugurated in September 2003. It has two halls; the main one has 517 seats and the smaller one has 67 seats.

== See also ==
- List of concert halls
