= Gorenje =

Slovenian major appliance manufacturer

Gorenje gospodinjski aparati, d.o.o.
- Type: Subsidiary
- Industry: Manufacturing
- Founded: 1950; 76 years ago
- Founder: Ivan Atelšek
- Headquarters: Velenje, Slovenia
- Area served: Worldwide
- Key people: Franjo Bobinac, President and CEO of Management Board
- Products: Home appliances
- Revenue: €1.184 billion (2018)
- Operating income: −44,588,000 (2019)
- Net income: €111 million (2018)
- Total assets: €1.061 billion (2018)
- Total equity: €245 million (2018)
- Number of employees: c. 11,098
- Parent: Hisense
- Website: gorenje.com

Gorenje (Slovene pronunciation: [ɡɔˈrɛ̀ːnjɛ]); stylised as gorenje), is a Slovenian major appliance manufacturer, founded in 1950 by Ivan Atelšek. It is based in Velenje, Slovenia. It is the sixth largest manufacturer of household appliances in Europe. Appliances are sold under the company's own brands Gorenje, Asko, Mora, Atag, Pelgrim, Etna, Körting and Sidex, and are produced in the main production facility in Velenje, as well as at the cooking appliances plant Mora Moravia in Mariánské Údolí (Czech Republic) and at the fridge-freezer plant in Valjevo (Serbia).

Since the company’s beginnings in 1950, Gorenje has expanded into a multinational corporation and the Gorenje Group includes 83 subsidiary companies, 59 of which are located outside Slovenia. In addition to household appliances, Gorenje manufactures ceramics, kitchen and bathroom furniture, and provides services in the fields of energy, ecology, and trade. Its products for homes, services, and companies are present in over 90 countries, mostly in Europe. It collaborates with Swarovski, Pininfarina, Karim Rashid, and Ora-Ïto.

In June 2018, Hisense acquired a 95% majority stake in the Gorenje Group.

== History ==
=== 1950s–1960s ===
In 1950, Gorenje was established by the Yugoslavian government in the village of Gorenje, Šmartno ob Paki. Initially, the company manufactured agricultural machinery. In 1958, Gorenje started producing solid-fuel cookers. In 1960, the company was relocated to the nearby town of Velenje. In 1961, Gorenje exported the first 200 cookers to Germany.

In 1965, Gorenje started producing washing machines under license from Zanussi. The first washing machine was PS 270 (a re-badge of Zanussi's eponymous 1964 Rex Superautomatic Mod. 270). A total of 10,886 units were produced until the end of 1966. A follow-up model, PS 275 (a re-badge of Zanussi's 1966 Rex T4), was launched in 1967. The first two models were only assembled in Velenje, as all parts and components came from Italy. Other well-known models include PS613, PS652, PS653, PS663, PS663BIO Gorenje launched these models in 1968.

=== 1970–1980s ===
During the 1970s, the product range was expanded to kitchen units, ceramics, medical equipment, telecommunications devices, TV sets, and other electrical goods. Gorenje continued its expansion and employed over 20,000 people during the 1970s. It also began establishing a distribution and sales network in Western Europe (Germany, Austria, France, Denmark, and Italy) and Australia. In 1978, Gorenje bought the German manufacturer Körting.

In the 1980s, Gorenje narrowed its focus to the production of domestic appliances. Also, the UK and the USA were added to the export market network during the 1980s. In 1987 the New Line product line was launched.

=== 1990s ===
In 1993, Bosch took over Gorenje's small household appliance factory in Nazarje (Slovenia). From 1991 to 1996, Gorenje continued to expand its distribution and sales network in Eastern Europe. In 1997, Gorenje became a publicly traded joint stock company.

=== 2000s ===
In 2000, the first appliances collection designed by the Italian design studio Pininfarina was launched. In 2004, the PremiumTouch line of washing machines and dryers was launched, with innovative features such as a touch screen, electronic drawer system and 2000 RPM spin speed.

In 2005, Gorenje took over the Czech manufacturer of kitchen ranges, Mora Moravia.

In 2006, several new facilities were opened. A new refrigerator and freezer plant was opened in Valjevo, and a water heater and radiator plant was opened in Stara Pazova (Serbia).

Also, the second collection of household appliances Gorenje Pininfarina, designed by the Italian design studio Pininfarina, was launched.

In 2007, the Gorenje Ora-Ïto Collection was launched in Istanbul. The first Gorenje Pink Oldtimer was sold at a charity auction to raise money for a campaign against cancer.

In 2008, Gorenje continued its cooperation with Pininfarina and launched the Gorenje Pininfarina Black collection. The Dutch provider of white goods, ATAG, was acquired by the company. Also, Gorenje took part in the Internationale Funkausstellung Berlin fair in Berlin, unveiling its innovative fridge-freezer Gorenje "Made for iPod." The Gorenje Ora-Ïto White collection of appliances was launched.

In 2009, Gorenje participated in the Milan Design Week presenting Mini hot plate Mrs. Dalloway, Gorenje designed by Nika Zupanc.

=== 2010s ===
In 2010, Gorenje took over Swedish appliance manufacturer Asko Appliances.

In 2013, Gorenje sold a 13% stake in the firm to Japanese Panasonic for around €10 million. In November 2016, trading in Gorenje at the Ljubljana Stock Exchange was suspended for 3 days after Panasonic refused to take over the company and the shares dropped lower than the Ljubljana exchange’s daily limit of 15%.

In June 2018, the Chinese company Hisense became the majority shareholder in Gorenje Group with a 95.42% stake. A total of 5,165 shareholders accepted the takeover bid of 12 euros per share, which valued the company at 293 million euros.

According to the Dutch OSINT platform Datenna, Hisense's stake in Gorenje leads to a high risk of state influence on Gorenje by the Chinese government.

The company was transformed to a limited liability company (d.o.o.) in March 2019.

=== 2020s ===
In 2020, the newly founded company Hisense Europe Electronic announced that it would start production of televisions for the European market through Gorenje in the new plant near Velenje. In the same year, the newly founded company Hisense Gorenje Europe, d.o.o. based in Ljubljana, took over the commercial activities of Hisense Europe Group and Gorenje.

In June 2021, the sales arms of Hisense and Gorenje in Germany merged into Hisense Gorenje Germany GmbH. The company moved to Garching near Munich.

Gorenje has continued its operations in Russia despite international sanctions and calls for companies to cease business activities in the country following the 2022 Russian invasion of Ukraine. In 2023, the company reported a significant increase in revenue compared to 2022. Meanwhile, Gorenje's products are included in Russia's "parallel imports" list, allowing unauthorized importation of their goods without the company's consent, undermining their intellectual property rights. This situation has drawn criticism as Gorenje’s ongoing presence in Russia contributes to the local economy, supporting the Russian government's war efforts against Ukraine.

== Gorenje Business Aviation ==
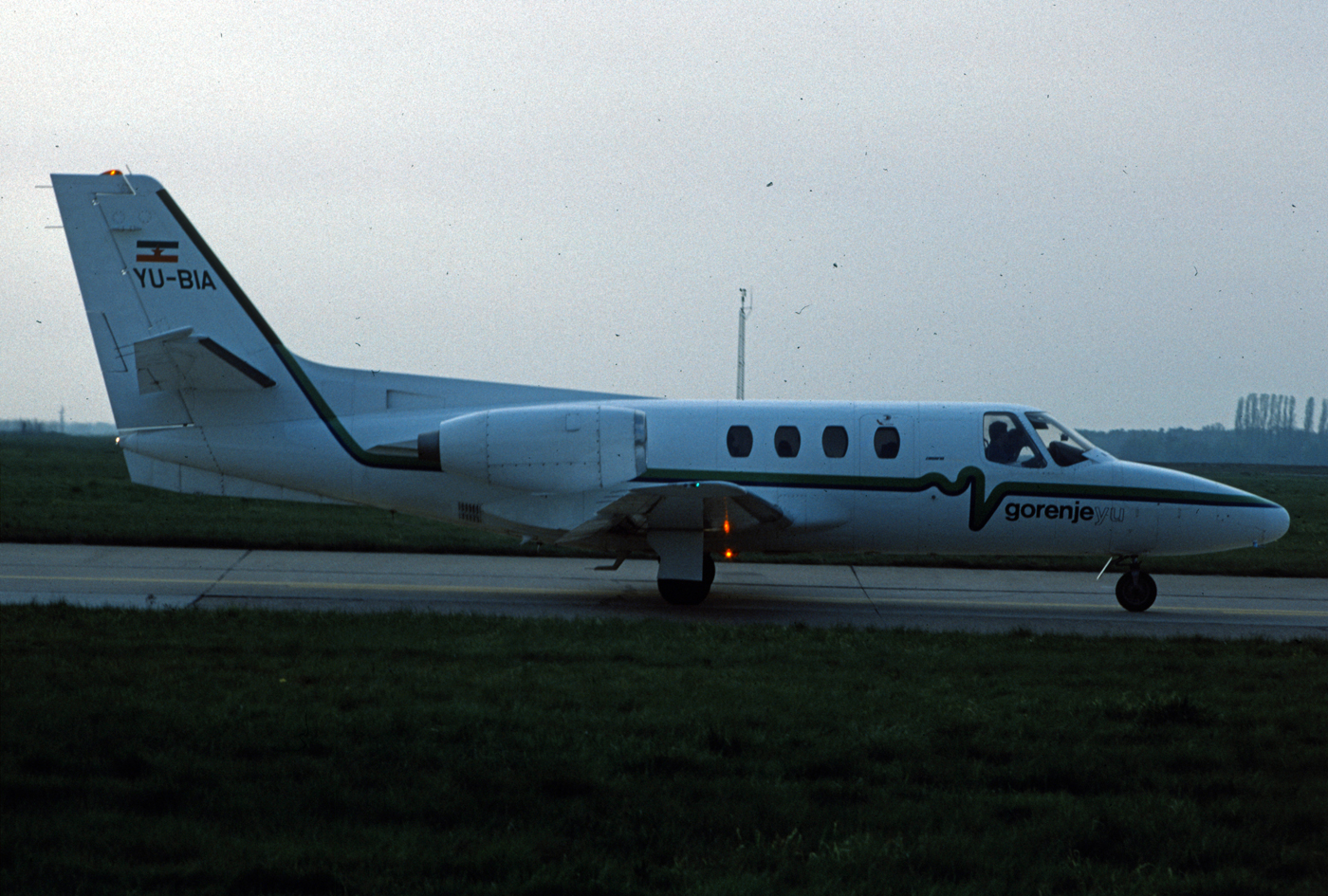
Gorenje Business Aviation - Cessna Citation I 1988 YU-BIA

In 1973 Gorenje acquired a Piper PA-34 Seneca YU-BIL for corporate travel, later upgrading to the pressurized Piper PA-31 Navajo YU-BKY aircraft was later acquired. In 1978, the company entered the business jet segment with a purchased a seven-seater Cessna Citation I YU-BIA private jet. In 1989, the aircraft was replaced by a ten-seater Cessna Citation II YU-BPL, SL-BAC, S5-BAC. Gorenje used the aircraft for its business needs and to serve its business partners. At the time, business aviation carried significant prestige, reinforcing Gorenje’s reputation as a serious and forward-looking company. As one of the few firms in the 1970s with such capabilities, Gorenje gained access to markets where others struggled, with business aviation and personal connections playing a key role in opening new opportunities. Gorenje ceased its aviation business in 1995, the aircraft was subsequently used by Smelt Air.

Aircraft	Speed	Range	Registration	Origin
Piper PA-34 Seneca I	340 km/h	1500 km	YU-BIL	United States
Piper PA-31P Navajo	380 km/h	1800 km	YU-BKY	United States
Cessna 500 Citation I	660 km/h	2400 km	YU-BIA	United States
Cessna 550 Citation II	740 km/h	3700 km	YU-BPL, S5-BAC	United States

== Sponsorship ==
Gorenje is the general sponsor of Slovenian Nordic Ski Teams, the Gorenje Handball Club, the French football championship Coupe de la Ligue, and the institution Sport & Media.

== Logos ==
From 1954, there have been four different logos for the company. The company's first logo was used from 1954 to 1963, the second logo was used from 1963 to 1971, the third logo from 1971 to 1977, and the fourth and current logo has been in use since 1977.
