= Emtunga, Sweden =

Emtunga
- Location within Västra Götaland Location within Sweden
- Coordinates: 58°15′N 13°00′E
- Country: Sweden
- Province: Västergötland
- County: Västra Götaland County
- Municipality: Vara Municipality

Area
  - Total: 0.31 km^{2} (0.12 sq mi)

Population (31 December 2010)
  - Total: 273
  - Density: 881/km^{2} (2,280/sq mi)
- Time zone: UTC+1 (CET)
  - Summer (DST): UTC+2 (CEST)
- Climate: Cfb

Emtunga is a locality situated in Vara Municipality, Västra Götaland County, Sweden with 273 inhabitants in 2010.

== See also ==
- Emtunga, a company founded in Emtunga in 1945.
