= Epack Durable =

EPACK DURABLE LTD.
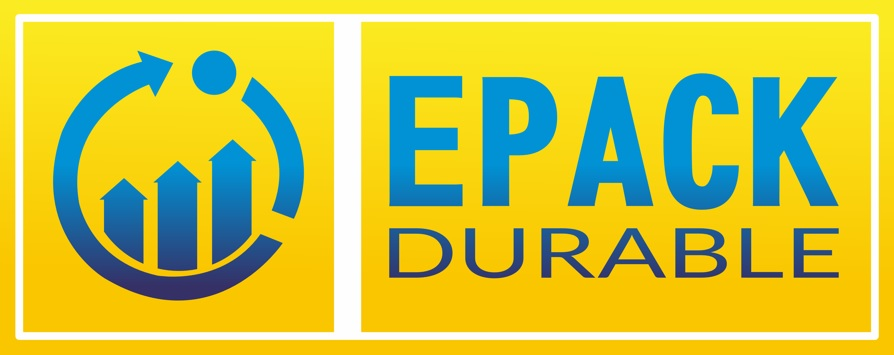
- Company type: Public Limited Company
- Traded as: BSE: 544095; NSE: EPACK
- Industry: Appliances, Electrical, and Electronics Manufacturing
- Founded: 2003
- Founder: Mr Ajay Singhania & Mr. Bajrang Bothra
- Headquarters: Noida, Uttar Pradesh., India
- Area served: India
- Key people: Mr. Bajrang Bothra (Chairman and Whole-time Director), Mr. Ajay DD Singhania (Managing Director and Chief Executive Officer), Mr. Sanjay Singhania (Non-Executive Director), Mr. Laxmi Pat Bothra (Non-Executive Director)
- Services: Original equipment manufacturer; Original design manufacturer
- Revenue: ₹1500 crore (FY24)
- Website: epackdurable.com

EPACK DURABLE is an Indian OEM and ODM manufacturer of living appliances. The company specializes in design and manufacturing of large domestic appliances such as air conditioners, washing machines, air coolers, small kitchen appliances and components. It is headquartered in Noida, Uttar Pradesh.

EPACK Durable is a publicly listed company on National Stock Exchange of India (NSE) and Bombay Stock Exchange (BSE) as of 30 January 2024.

== History ==
EPACK Durable was established in 2003 in Greater Noida as an Aircon OEM by Mr. Bajrang Bothra, Mr. Ajay DD Singhania, Mr. Sanjay Singhania, and Mr. Laxmi Pat Bothra.

The company raised two rounds of private equity in 2021 and 2022 respectively.

In October 2021, the company started its new manufacturing plant in Bhiwadi, Rajasthan.

In November 2023, the company launched its new plant in Sri City, Andhra Pradesh by investing ₹200 crore.

EPACK launched its IPO in January 2024 with an issue size of Rs. 640 crore.

In September 2024, EPACK partnered with Symphony Limited to manufacture air coolers as OEMs.

This was followed by another partnership with Hisense Singapore for manufacturing of air conditioner and home appliances for Hisense in October 2024.

In the same month, the company also partnered with Cellecor Gadgets Limited.

== Operations ==
EPACK Durable has three manufacturing units located in Rajasthan, Uttar Pradesh and Andhra Pradesh.

== Read more ==
- Stock Research Report of Epack Durable Ltd.
- Technical Analysis Report of Epack Durable
- Epack Durable IPO Analysis
- Swot Analysis Epack Durable
