= Loewe 3NF =

Early vacuum-tube attempt at an Integrated Circuit

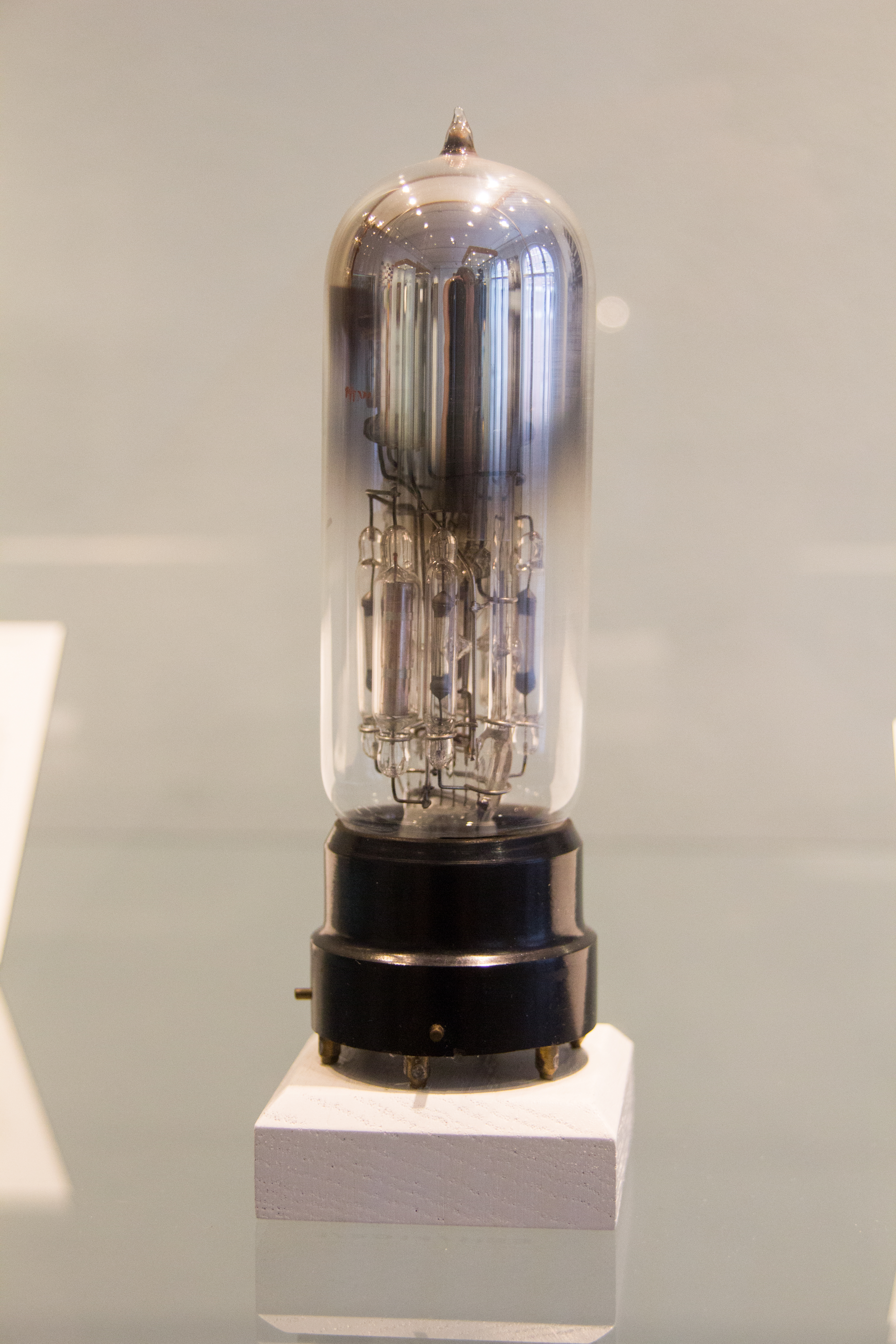
Loewe 3NF

The Loewe 3NF was an early attempt to combine several functions in one electronic device.

Produced by the German Loewe-Audion GmbH as early as 1926, the device consisted of three triode valves (tubes) in a single glass envelope together with two fixed capacitors and four fixed resistors required to make a complete radio receiver. The resistors and capacitors had to be sealed in their own glass tubes to prevent them from contaminating the vacuum.

The only other parts required to build a radio receiver were the tuning coil, the tuning capacitor and the loudspeaker. The device was produced not to enter the integrated circuit era several decades early, but to evade German taxes levied on a per valveholder basis. As the Loewe set had only one valveholder, it was able to substantially undercut the competition. The resultant radio receiver required a 90 volt HT plus a 4 volt LT (A and B) battery (the HT battery provided not only 82.5 volts for the HT, but also two grid bias supplies at −1.5 volts and −7.5 volts).

One million were manufactured, and were "a first step in integration of radioelectronic devices".

One major disadvantage of the 3NF was that if one filament failed, the whole device was rendered useless. Loewe countered this by offering a filament repair service.

Loewe were to also offer the 2NF (two tetrodes plus passive components) and the WG38 (two pentodes, a triode and the passive components).
