= Jung, Sweden =

Jung
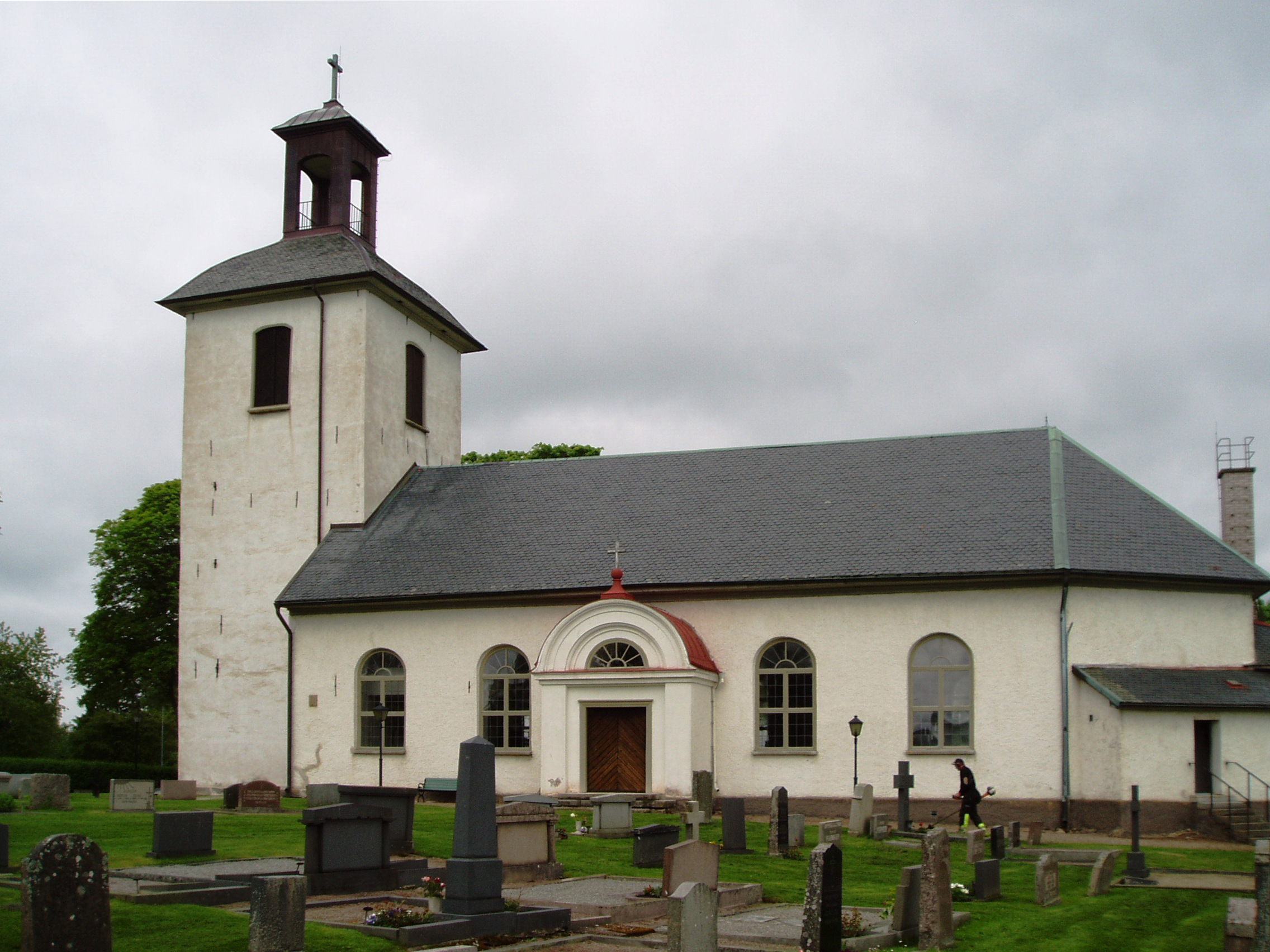
- Jung church, Vara municipality, Sweden

- Location within Västra Götaland Location within Sweden
- Coordinates: 58°20′N 13°07′E
- Country: Sweden
- Province: Västergötland
- County: Västra Götaland County
- Municipality: Vara Municipality

Area
  - Total: 1.04 km^{2} (0.40 sq mi)

Population (31 December 2010)
  - Total: 408
  - Density: 392/km^{2} (1,020/sq mi)
- Time zone: UTC+1 (CET)
  - Summer (DST): UTC+2 (CEST)
- Climate: Cfb

Jung is a locality situated in Vara Municipality, Västra Götaland County, Sweden with 408 inhabitants in 2010.
