= Loewe (electronics) =

German electronics company

Loewe Technology GmbH
- Type: Incorporation
- Industry: Consumer Electronics
- Founded: 23 January 1923; 103 years ago
- Headquarters: Kronach, Germany
- Key people: Aslan Khabliev, CEO; Thomas Putz, CTO; Christian Alber, COO
- Products: TVs, audio products and multiroom solutions

Loewe Technology GmbH, doing business as Loewe (German: [ˈløːvə]), is a German company that develops, designs, manufactures, and sells consumer electronics and electromechanical products and systems. The company was founded in Berlin, in 1923, by brothers Siegmund and David L. Loewe. Since 1948, the company has based its headquarters and production facilities in the Bavarian town of Kronach, Upper Franconia.

== History ==
The company was started in 1923 in Berlin, when Siegmund Loewe and his brother David Ludwig Loewe established a radio manufacturing company named Radiofrequenz GmbH. Siegmund Loewe belonged to a circle which promoted public broadcasting in Germany and did his best to initiate what later became known as the radio boom. His work with the young physicist Manfred von Ardenne in 1926 led to the development of the Loewe 3NF, an early attempt to combine several functions into one electronic device, similar to the modern integrated circuit. It was the basis for the broadcast receiver OE 333 that Loewe produced in his factory from 1926 on, of which for the first time in Germany several hundred of thousands sets were sold.

Television development began at Loewe in 1929. The company worked together with British television pioneer John Logie Baird. In 1931, Manfred von Ardenne presented the world's first fully electronic television to the public on the Loewe stand at the 8th Berlin Radio Show. The New York Times reported on the invention on its front page. Between 1930 and 1935, Loewe registered the most television patents worldwide.

When Adolf Hitler came to power in Germany, Siegmund Loewe was forced to emigrate to the US in 1938, where he developed a friendship with Albert Einstein. From 1939 Loewe mainly produced radio technology for the German Luftwaffe and in 1940 came into the possession of the Reich Aviation Ministry.

In 1949, Siegmund Loewe regained possession of the company's property and took over as chairman of the supervisory board. In the 1950s, Loewe began producing the Optaphon, an early cassette tape recorder with auto-reverse function, but it was not a commercial success. In contrast, the start of radio and television production at the current site in Kronach was very successful and Loewe was able to increase its turnover from 10 to 169 million Deutsch Marks between 1949 and 1960. In 1961, Loewe launched with Optacord 500 the first European video recorder for professional use.

In 1962, the family company tradition ended with the death of Siegmund Loewe. Subsidiaries of the Philips group took over the majority of shares. Under this management, which continued until 1985, the company specialised increasingly in the development and production of televisions. In 1963, Loewe launched the Optaport, a portable television. It had for the first time a 25 cm-wide screen and built-in FM radio. The first Loewe colour televisions were launched along with the introduction of colour television in Germany in 1967. In 1979, Loewe began production of the fully integrated chassis television, which secured the future of the company. In February 1981, Loewe presented Europe's first stereo sound television to the press.

In 1985, a management buyout (MBO) made Loewe independent again after Philips sold its shares. A new automotive electronics division was successfully launched in cooperation with BMW. In 1991, the Japanese group Matsushita (Panasonic) acquired a stake in Loewe and also took over the BMW share in 1993; however, Matsushita sold its shares in 1997. The company subsequently went public.

Also in 1985, Loewe designer Heinz Jünger created the Art 1 television, laying the foundation for Loewe's rise to become an internationally renowned premium brand with a clear design strategy. While Loewe had previously repeatedly attracted attention with its independent product designs (e.g. Opta 537, Palette, line 2001, Loewe MCS), it was only now that it developed its own profile. With the success of the Art 1 behind it, a separate corporate design was developed and the Loewe design department was systematically transformed into a design management department. Numerous well-known designers such as Hubertus Carl Frey alias hace, who designed the Loewe brand, as well as industrial design agencies such as Phoenix, Neumeister and Design3 worked as external designers for Loewe during these years.

1998 marked two more milestones in the company history: the launch of the Xelos @Media, a television with internet access, and that of the Spheros, the first Loewe flat-screen television. In the following year, Loewe AG had its IPO, led by Rainer Hecker (CEO) and Burkhard Bamberger (CFO).

By 2002, Loewe had established a market position as a supplier of high-quality and design-oriented CRT televisions. However, due to the triumph of flat-screen televisions, Loewe's sales of picture tube televisions in the premium segment collapsed in 2003. Loewe responded with a reorganization program, switched the television range completely to flat screens and revitalized the brand by pursuing an even stricter premium course. In 2008, Loewe was honored with the German Brand Award 2008 in the Best Brand Relaunch category because the company had mastered the brand crisis with a consistent premium strategy and achieved a turnaround.

Following financial hardships, in July 2013 the company filed for bankruptcy protection, but on 1 October 2013, the Loewe Group entered into a self-administration process. In March 2014, major assets from Loewe AG were taken by the Munich-based investor Stargate Capital GmbH.

In December 2019, Skytec Group Ltd took 100% ownership of the brand, creating Loewe Technology GmbH and associated subsidiaries. In 2021, Loewe acquired 65,000 m^{2} of land and buildings from the town of Kronach to secure its location for the long-term future. The plans included step-by-step renovation of the complete area with erection of new office and administrative facilities. In 2021, Loewe introduced a new sub-brand: We.by.Loewe.

French football star Kylian Mbappe bought a stake in Loewe on 30 September 2024, which the company expects will lead to an increase in sales and possibly an IPO.

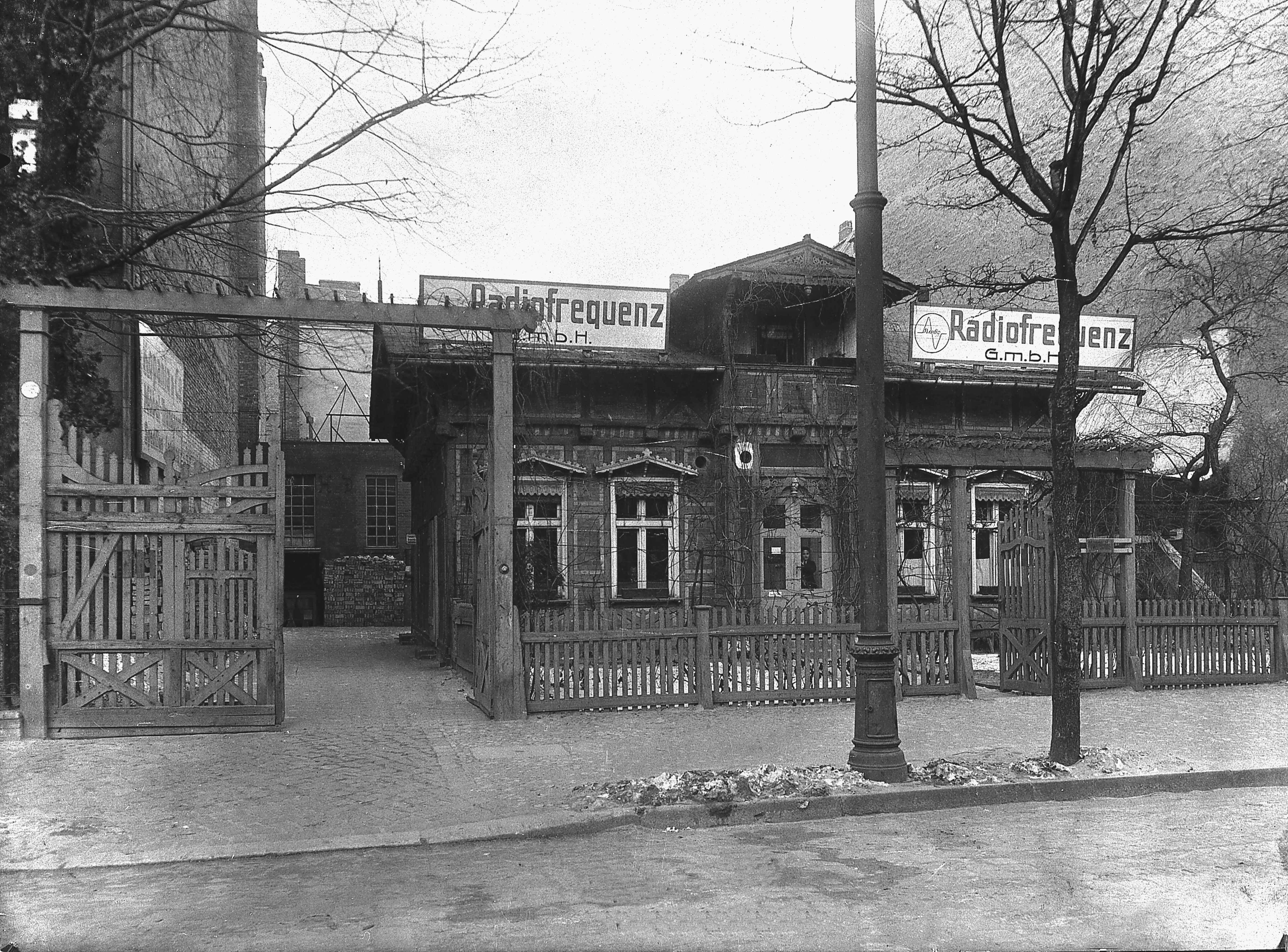
Loewe head office in Berlin, 1923

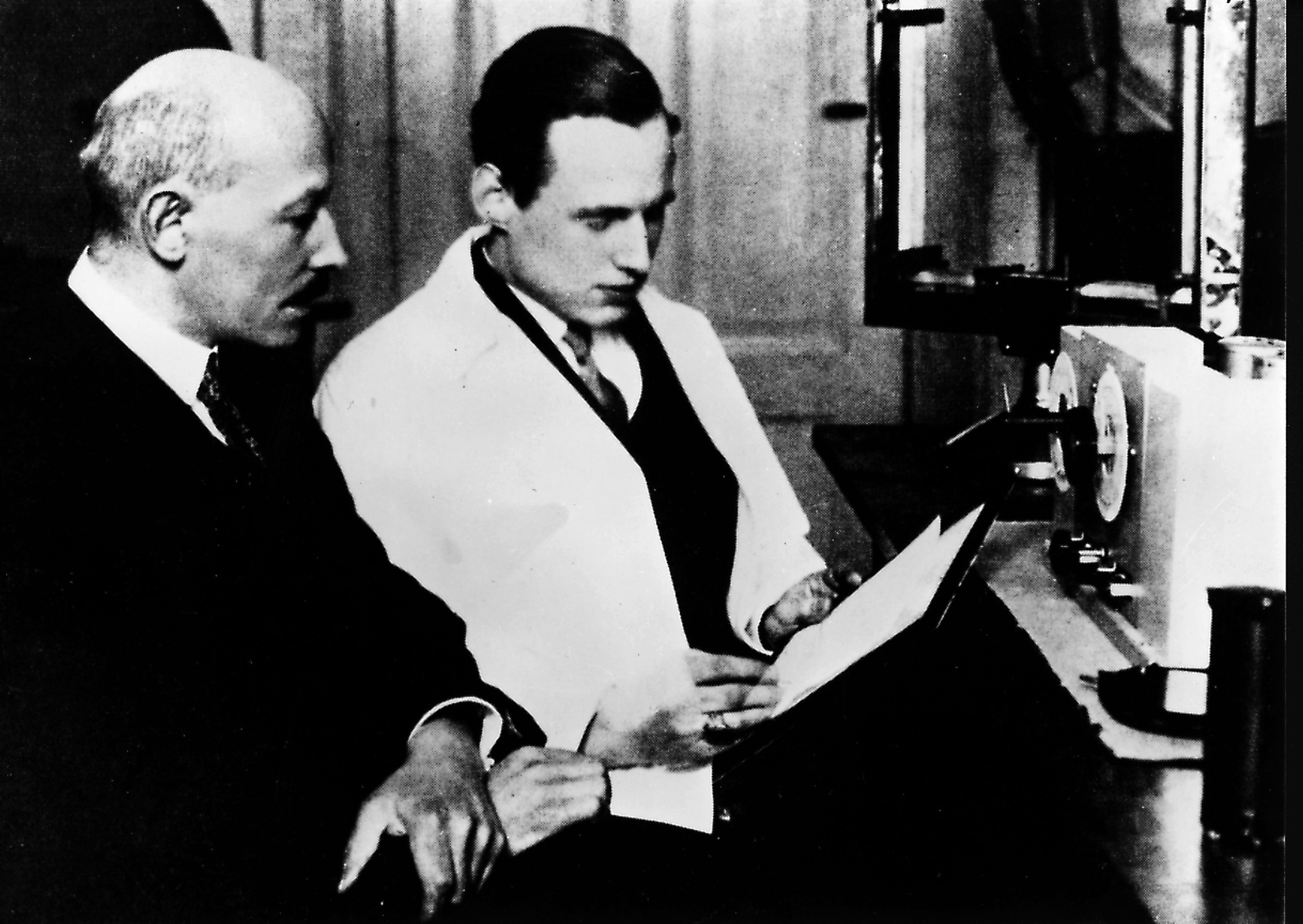
Siegmund Loewe & Manfred von Ardenne

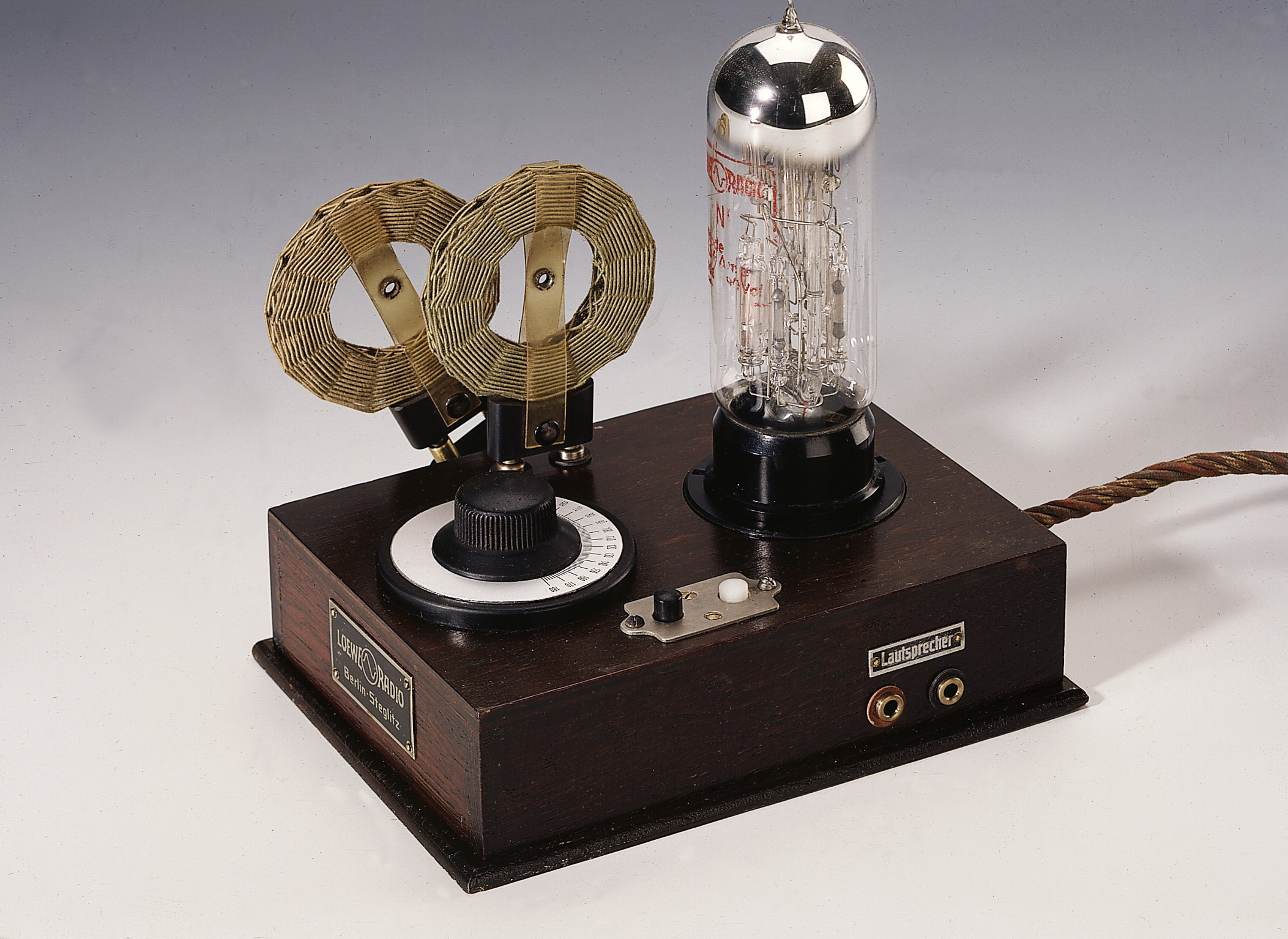
Loewe local receiver OE 333, 1926

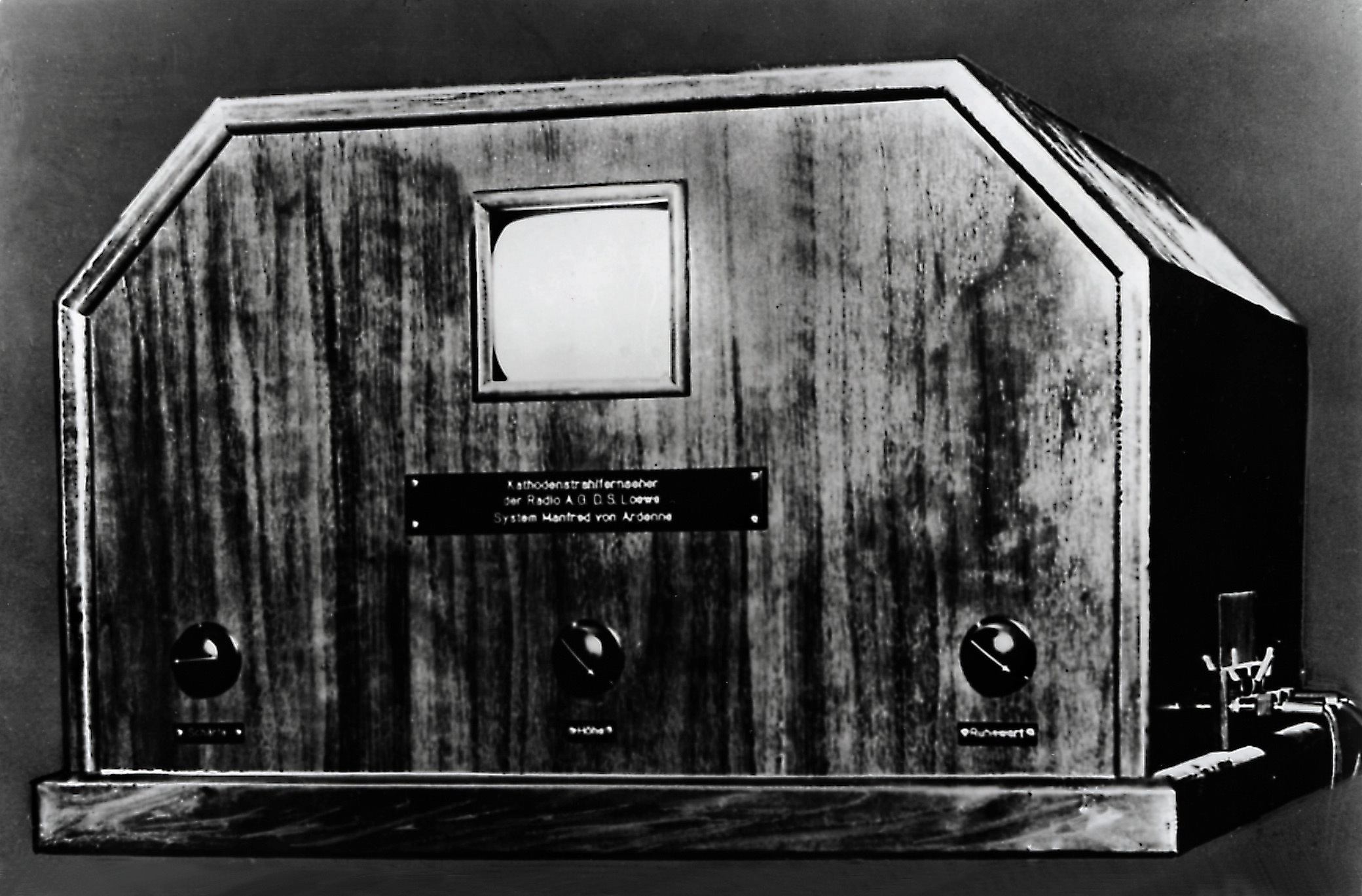
First Loewe TV, 1931

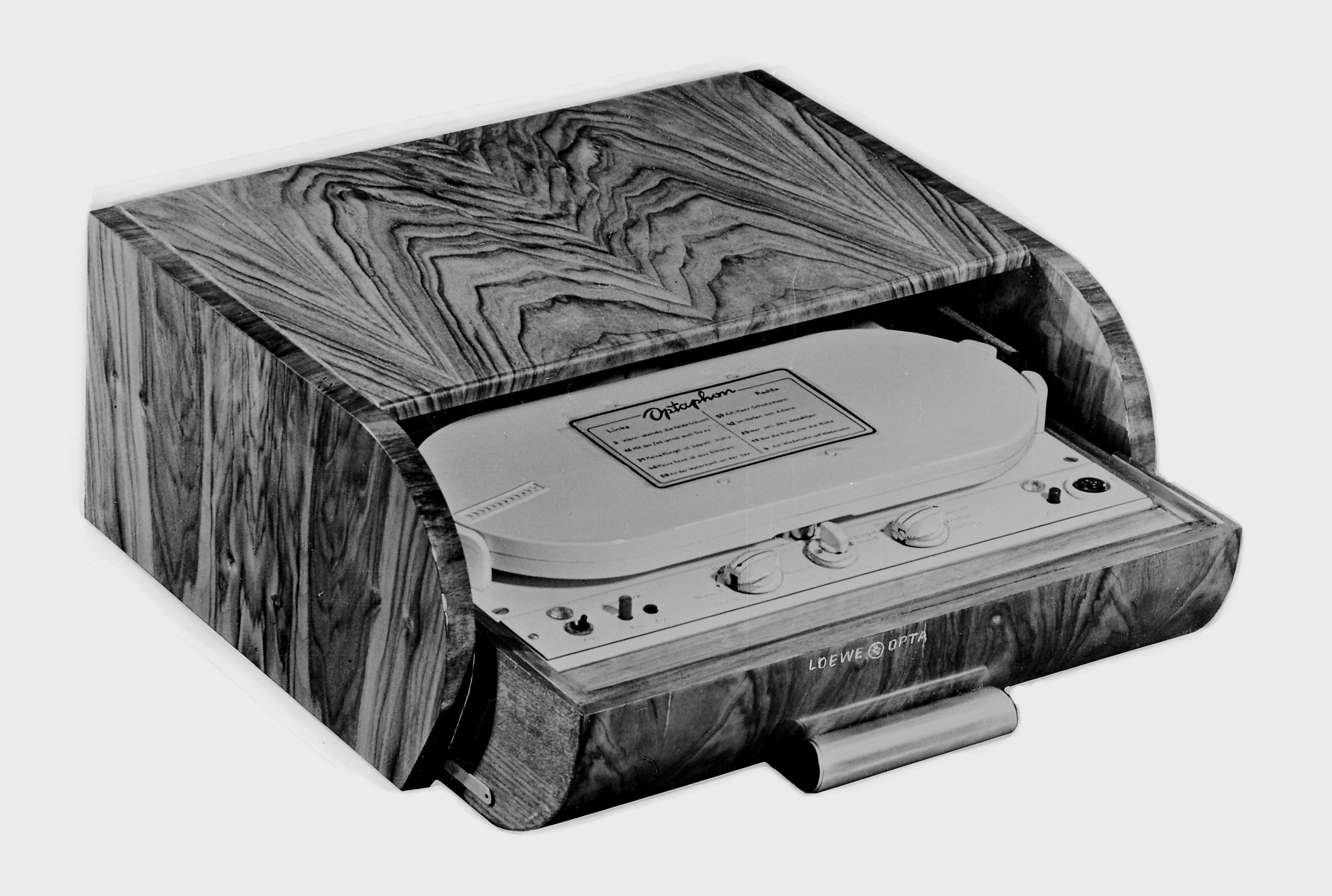
Loewe Optaphon, 1950

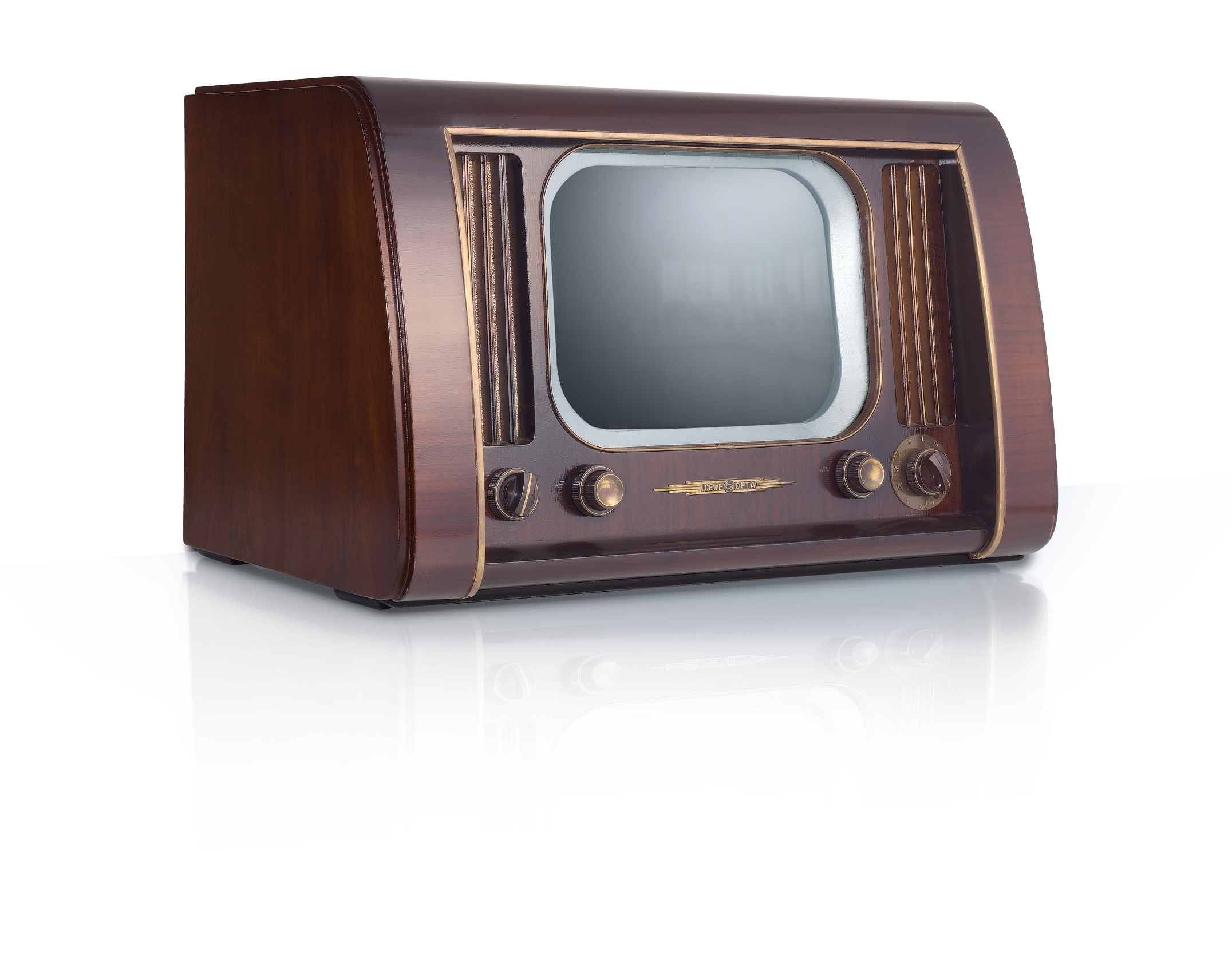
Loewe Iris, 1951

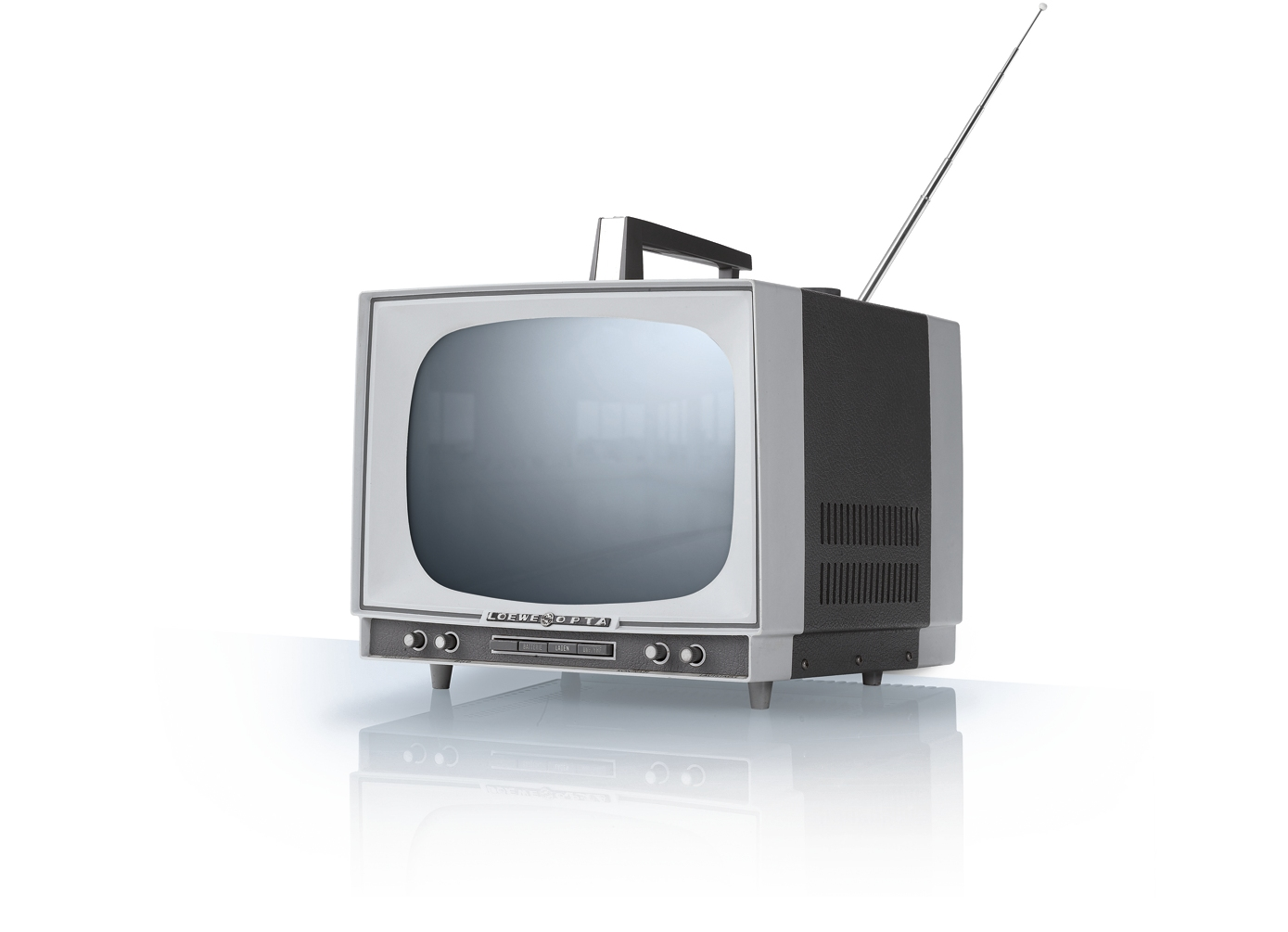
Loewe Optaport, 1963

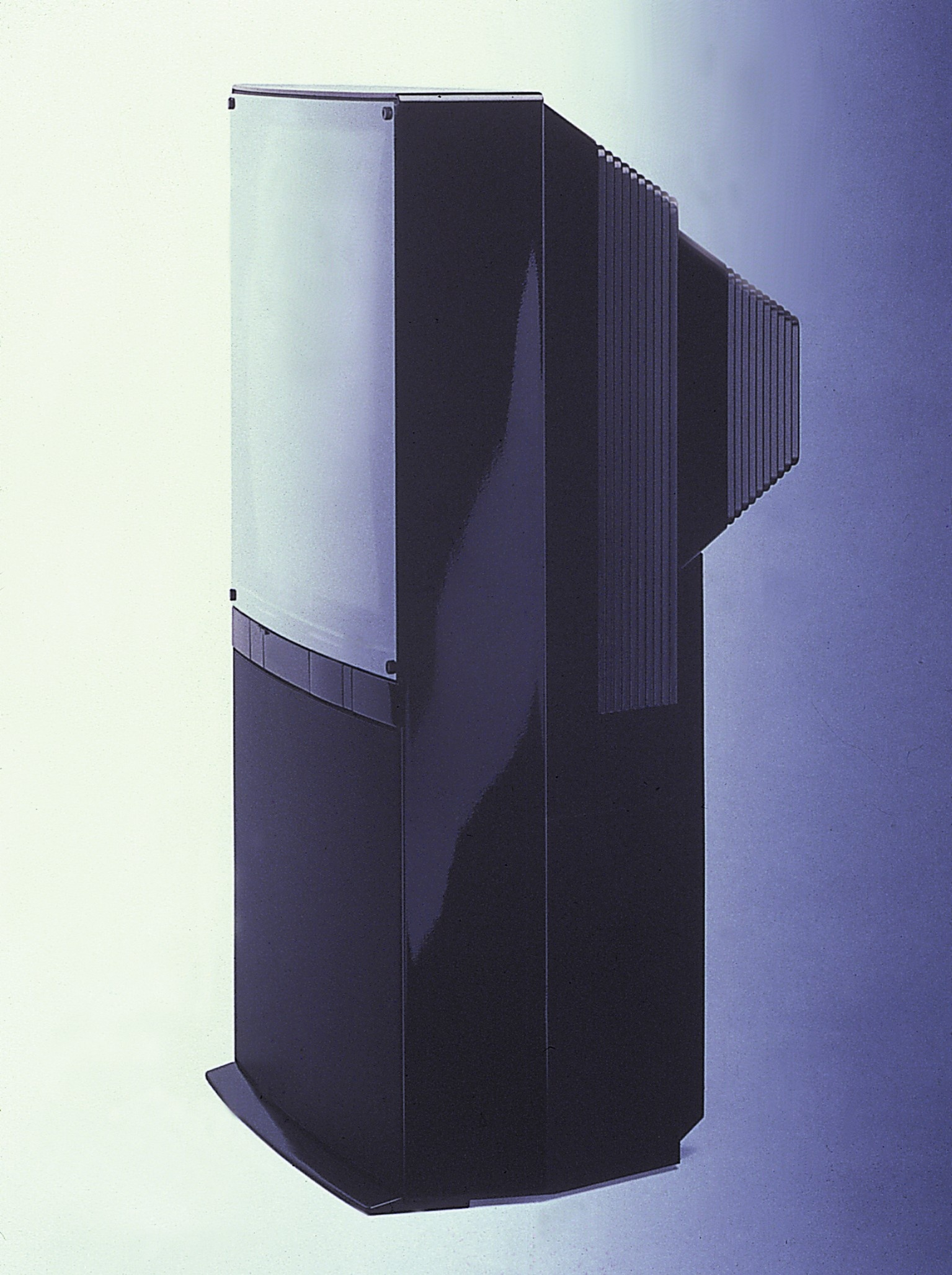
Loewe Art 1, 1985

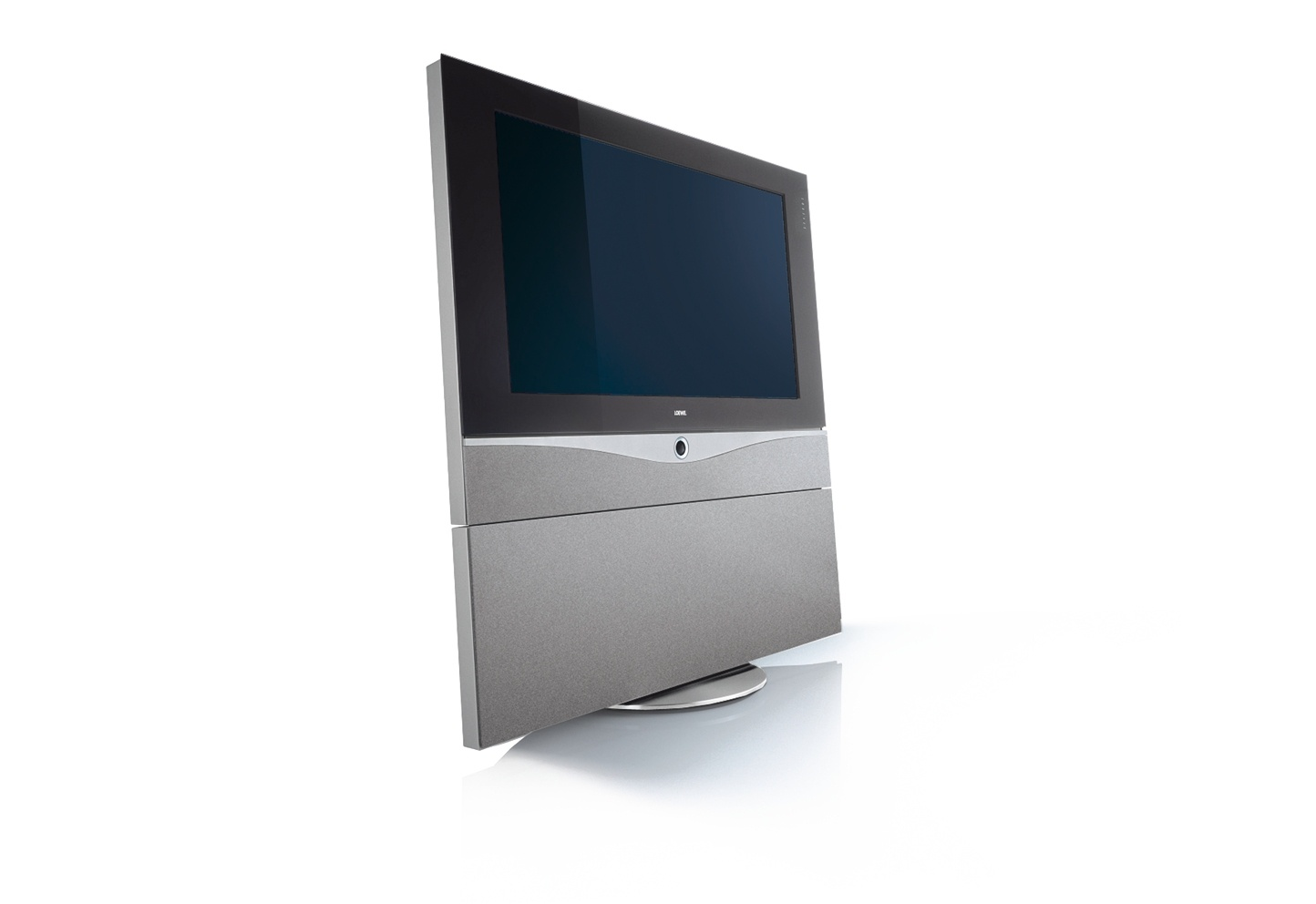
Loewe Spheros, 1998

== Bibliography ==
- 75 Jahre Loewe (1923–1998). Und die Zukunft geht weiter, author's edition 1998
- Oskar Blumtritt: The flying spot scanner, Manfred von Ardenne and the telecinema, in: Presenting Pictures. NMSI Trading Ltd, Science Museum, London 2004. p. 84-115. ISBN 1-900747-54-5
- Frank Keuper, Jürgen Kindervater, Heiko Dertinger, Andreas Heim (Ed.): Das Diktat der Markenführung. 11 Thesen zur nachhaltigen Markenführung und -implementierung. Mit einem umfassenden Fallbeispiel der Loewe AG, Gabler Fachverlage, Wiesbaden 2009, ISBN 978-3-8349-0852-0
- Speidel, Markus: Netzwerke, Kooperationen und Management-Buy-Out. Die Geschichte des Unternehmens Loewe zwischen 1962 und 1985 (in German). Klartext Verlag, Essen 2012, ISBN 978-3-8375-0756-0
- Kilian Steiner: Ortsempfänger, Volksfernseher und Optaphon. Die Entwicklung der deutschen Radio- und Fernsehindustrie und das Unternehmen Loewe 1923–1962. Klartext Verlag, Essen 2005, ISBN 978-3-89861-492-4
- Kilian Steiner: Loewe. 100 Jahre Designgeschichte. Loewe. 100 years design history (in German and English). Stuttgart: avedition, Stuttgart 2023 ISBN 978-3-89986-390-1
