= Vara Municipality =

Vara Municipality Vara kommun
- Municipality
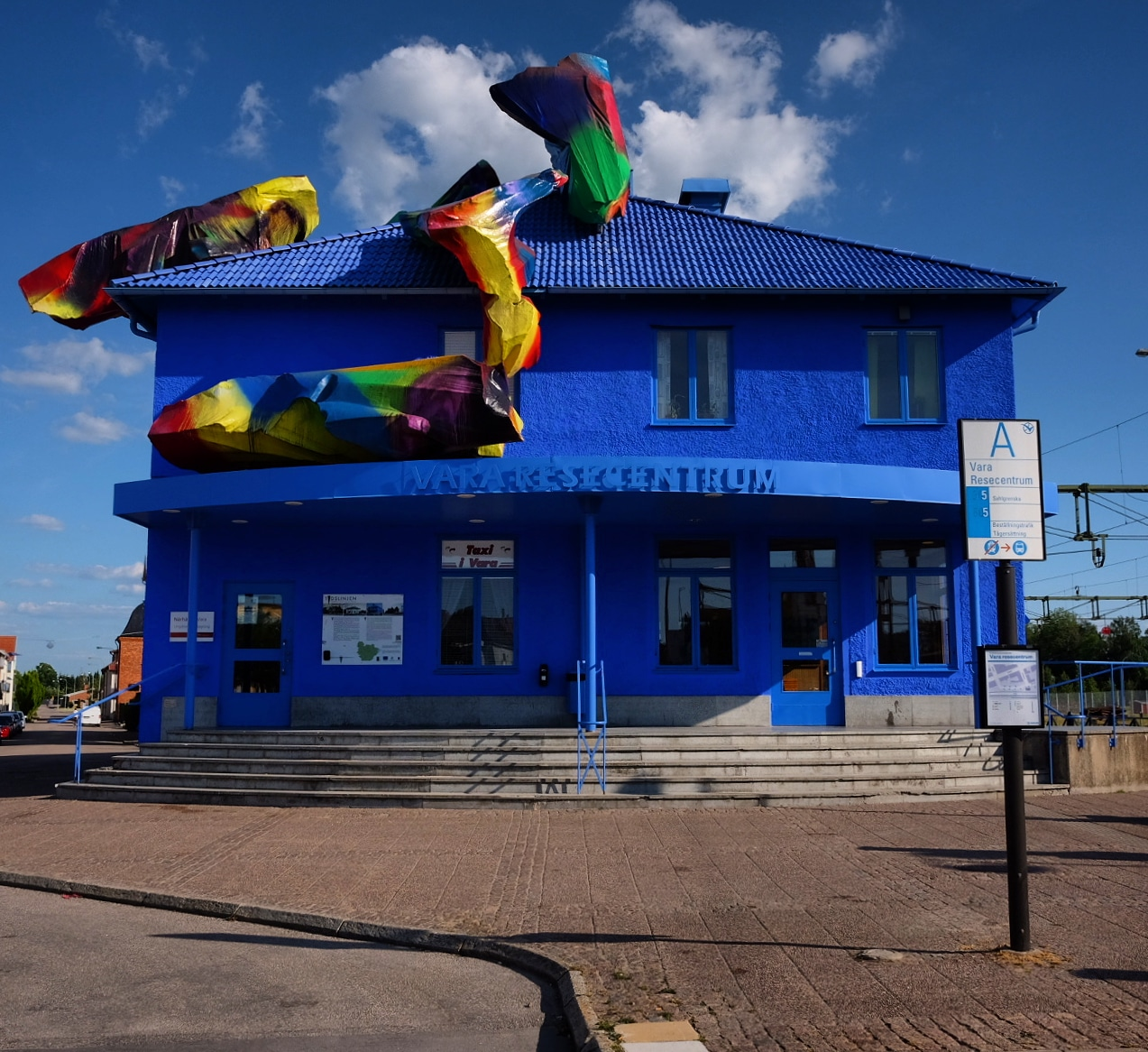
- Vara Railway Station

- Coat of arms

- Coordinates: 58°16′N 12°57′E
- Country: Sweden
- County: Västra Götaland County
- Seat: Vara

Area
  - Total: 700.604375 km^{2} (270.504861 sq mi)
  - Land: 696.914375 km^{2} (269.080145 sq mi)
  - Water: 3.69 km^{2} (1.42 sq mi)
- Area as of 1 January 2014.

Population (30 June 2025)
  - Total: 16,037
  - Density: 23.011/km^{2} (59.599/sq mi)
- Time zone: UTC+1 (CET)
  - Summer (DST): UTC+2 (CEST)
- ISO 3166 code: SE
- Province: Västergötland
- Municipal code: 1470
- Website: www.vara.se

Vara Municipality (Swedish: Vara kommun) is a municipality in Västra Götaland County in western Sweden. Its seat is located in the town of Vara.

The present municipality consists of 25 original local government entities (as of 1863). Between 1974 and 1982 the territory of present Essunga Municipality was also included.

== Districts ==
- Bitterna
- Edsvära
- Eling
- Fyrunga
- Hällum
- Jung
- Kvänum
- Larv
- Laske-Vedum
- Levene
- Long
- Längjum
- Naum
- Norra Vånga
- Ryda
- Skarstad
- Slädene
- Sparlösa
- Södra Kedum
- Södra Lundby
- Tråvad
- Vara
- Önum
- Öttum

== Demographics ==
This is a demographic table based on Vara Municipality's electoral districts in the 2022 Swedish general election sourced from SVT's election platform, in turn taken from SCB official statistics.

In total there were 16,140 residents, including 12,219 Swedish citizens of voting age. 38.2% voted for the left coalition and 61.0% for the right coalition. Indicators are in percentage points except population totals and income.

Location	Residents	Citizen adults	Left vote	Right vote	Employed	Swedish parents	Foreign heritage	Income SEK	Degree
Location			%	%					
Arentorp	1,697	1,301	38.5	60.2	83	92	8	25,551	28
Kvänum	2,311	1,618	36.3	63.0	75	81	19	22,541	23
Larv	1,360	1,045	32.7	65.9	84	89	11	25,014	29
Levene	1,742	1,368	38.7	61.0	83	89	11	24,336	31
Skarstad	1,775	1,341	32.9	66.3	82	87	13	24,772	25
Vara C	1,451	1,160	39.4	59.6	77	80	20	21,099	23
Vara V	1,724	1,371	40.0	59.3	86	93	7	27,457	36
Vara Ö	1,973	1,440	44.6	54.8	74	77	23	23,520	28
Vedum	2,107	1,575	40.1	59.2	79	86	14	24,560	22
Source: SVT
