= Vara, Sweden =

Vara
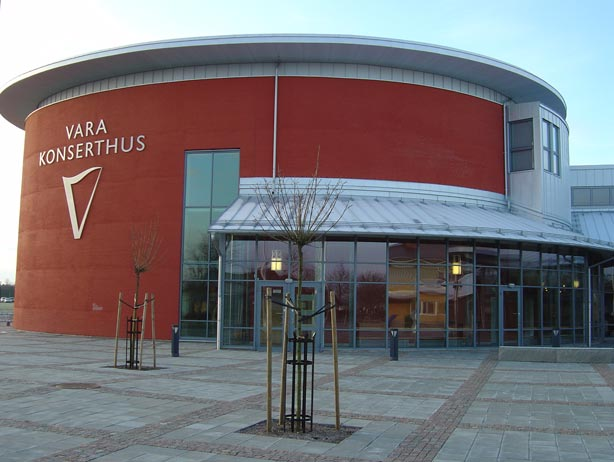
- Vara Concert Hall

- Location within Västra Götaland Location within Sweden
- Coordinates: 58°16′N 12°57′E
- Country: Sweden
- Province: Västergötland
- County: Västra Götaland County
- Municipality: Vara Municipality

Area
  - Total: 3.39 km^{2} (1.31 sq mi)

Population (31 December 2019)
  - Total: 4,235
  - Density: 1,285/km^{2} (3,330/sq mi)
- Time zone: UTC+1 (CET)
  - Summer (DST): UTC+2 (CEST)
- Climate: Cfb

Vara is a locality and the seat of Vara Municipality, Västra Götaland County, Sweden with 4,235 inhabitants in 2019.

Notable landmarks include the concert hall, the artwork on the train station called Blue Orange, Bengtssonska granary, and a folk high school.
