= Aiwa =

Japanese consumer electronics brand

Aiwa Co., Ltd.
- Logo from 1991 to 2002 and in its revived form since then
- Native name: アイワ株式会社
- Type: Privately held company (1951–1961) Public company (1961–2002) Trademark brand (2002–2008; 2015–present)
- Traded as: TYO: 6761
- Founded: June 20, 1951
- Defunct: December 1, 2002
- Fate: Absorbed by Sony Corporation, brand/trademark still in use
- Headquarters: Taito, Tokyo, Japan
- Number of employees: 10,000 (as of March 2001)
- Parent: Sony Corporation (1969–2002)

Aiwa Co., Ltd., branded as Aiwa (/ˈaɪwə/; stylised aiwa), was a Japanese consumer electronics company specializing in audio products. It was founded in 1951 by Mitsuo Ikejiri in Tokyo first developing microphones. The company was a majority-owned subsidiary of Sony Corporation from 1969 until 2002 although ran independently and often competed with its parent.

The company was for some time a leading manufacturer of audio products. It is credited for introducing Japan's first portable boombox in the year 1968 and the very first personal stereo cassette recorder in 1980 (the TP-S30). While prominent in earlier years in high-end tape decks, Aiwa later shifted to more mass market products such as its line of personal cassette players (marketed as CassetteBoy in Japan). In the 1990s, Aiwa was a major maker of mini component systems ("shelf stereos") with its NSX line and was also prominent in portable CD players. Despite not having the brand strength and recognition of Sony, Aiwa products were popular due to their more affordable cost, while still providing good quality.

Aiwa declined into deep financial trouble by the millennium, leading to a full buyout and merger into Sony who relaunched Aiwa in 2003 as a modern youth-targeting tech brand. This proved unsuccessful and the brand was soon abandoned by Sony. Since 2015, the brand has been revived and licensed by other companies around the world, including a relaunch as an independent company in Japan by Towada Audio in 2017.

== Name ==
In Japanese the Aiwa name is a combination of 愛 (ai) and 環 (wa), roughly meaning "circle of love".

== History ==
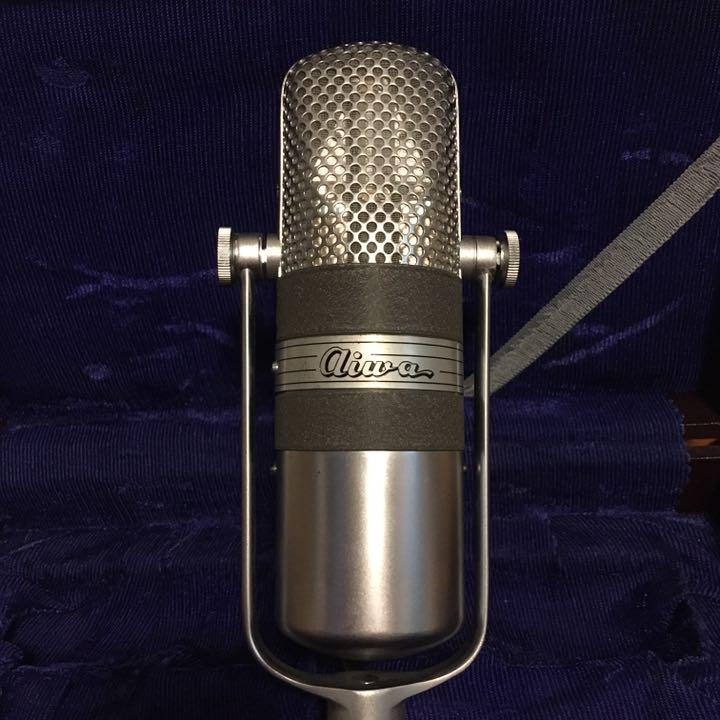
Aiwa VM-15 microphone made with NHK in c. 1957, designed to mimic the look of the RCA 77

The company was founded on June 20, 1951, as AIKO Denki Sangyo Co., Ltd., manufacturing microphones, and changed its name to Aiwa Co., Ltd. (アイワ株式会社), on March 10, 1959. Aiwa was listed on the Tokyo Stock Exchange from October 1961 until September 2002. Aiwa created the first Japanese cassette tape recorder in 1964. Aiwa marketed Japan's first boombox, the TPR-101, in 1968, as well as the first cassette deck, TP-1009. The founder Mitsuo Ikejiri served as president until 1969 when Sony purchased a majority share in Aiwa. By 1982, the electronics giant had an increased 54.6% stake in the company.

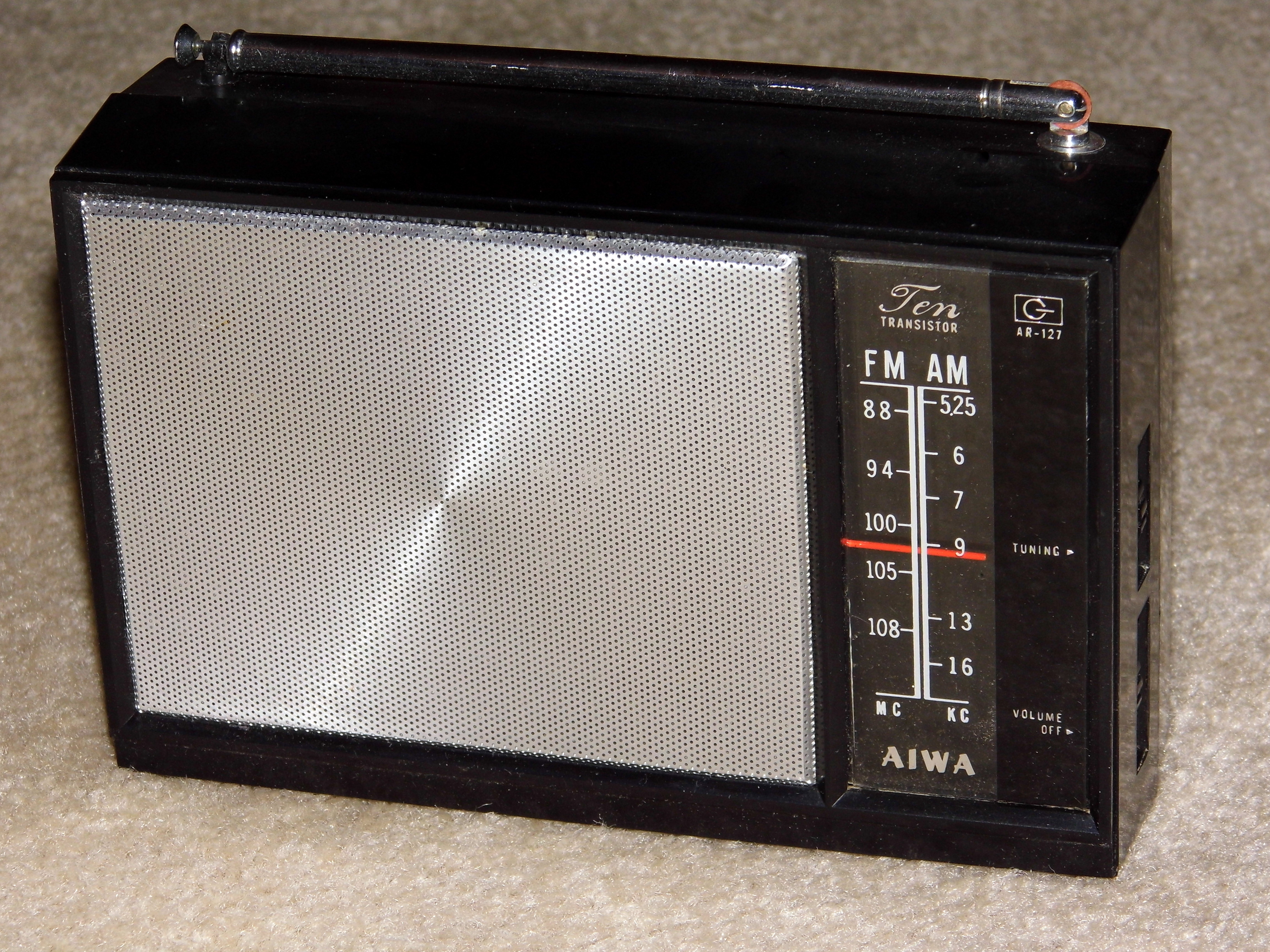
Dual band transistor radio by Aiwa, circa 1964

In 1980, Aiwa created the world's first personal stereo recorder, TP-S30 (marketed as CassetteBoy in Japan). Despite Sony being the major shareholder, healthy competition between the two brands was believed to be profitable.

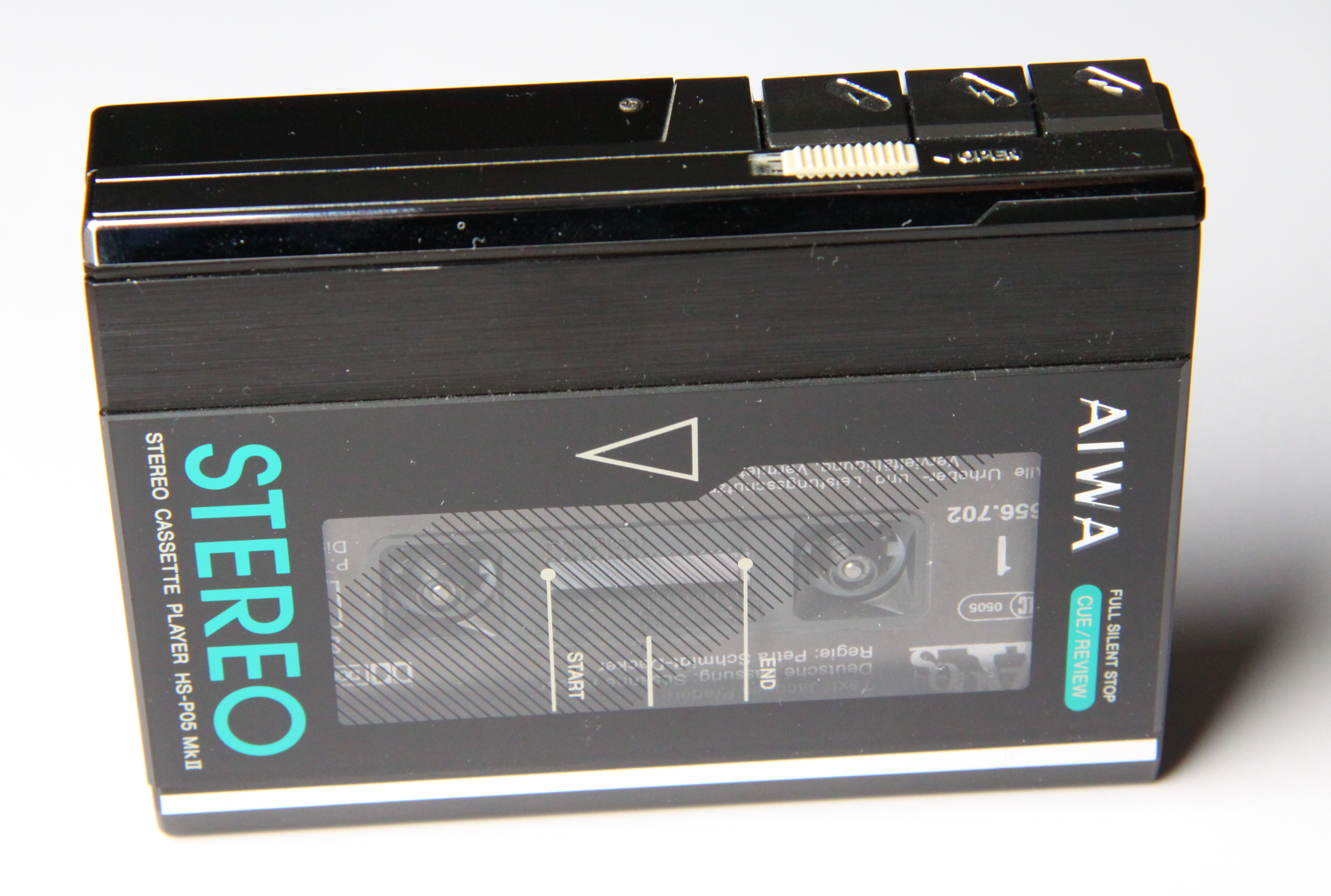
Mid-1980s AIWA HS-P05 Mk II audio cassette player

Aiwa faced its first crisis in the mid-1980s after the strong yen (Endaka). To counter this, the company boldly decided to shift manufacturing overseas like Singapore and Malaysia. It also stopped making Betamax VCRs to focus on its profitable portable audio-video products. The resulting lower costs for the products made the company target developing markets, later expanding exports to developed markets as well. The number of Aiwa factories in Japan were reduced from three to one. Hajime Ugi led this change and resulted in making Aiwa profitable again in FY 1989.

Aiwa home audio products incorporating BBE signal-processing technology were launched in about 1989, after the company signed a licensing deal with BBE Sound. Also around this time, some Aiwa products were briefly being sold in Japan under the Excelia and Strasser sub-brands.

It had also released the first cassette deck with Dolby C in its home country. In 1993, the first CD+G-compatible portable CD player, the XP-80G, was made.

=== Diversification ===
The Aiwa logo, 1959–1991

Apart from audio products, Aiwa was also present in other industries. The company also made and sold video products such as VCRs (it backed the Betamax standard of its parent Sony) and also color televisions and in later years DVD players, and digital satellite television tuners. Aiwa was also involved in the production of computer peripheral devices, such as modems, terminal adapters, and speakers, and what the company termed "life amenity products", such as air cleaners and humidifiers. In 1995, it released a PHS mobile phone, called the PT-H50, which was made for the DDI Pocket network in Japan. That same year, an electric toothbrush was released.

As of 2000, up to 70 percent of Aiwa's sales came from home audio products.

=== Later years ===
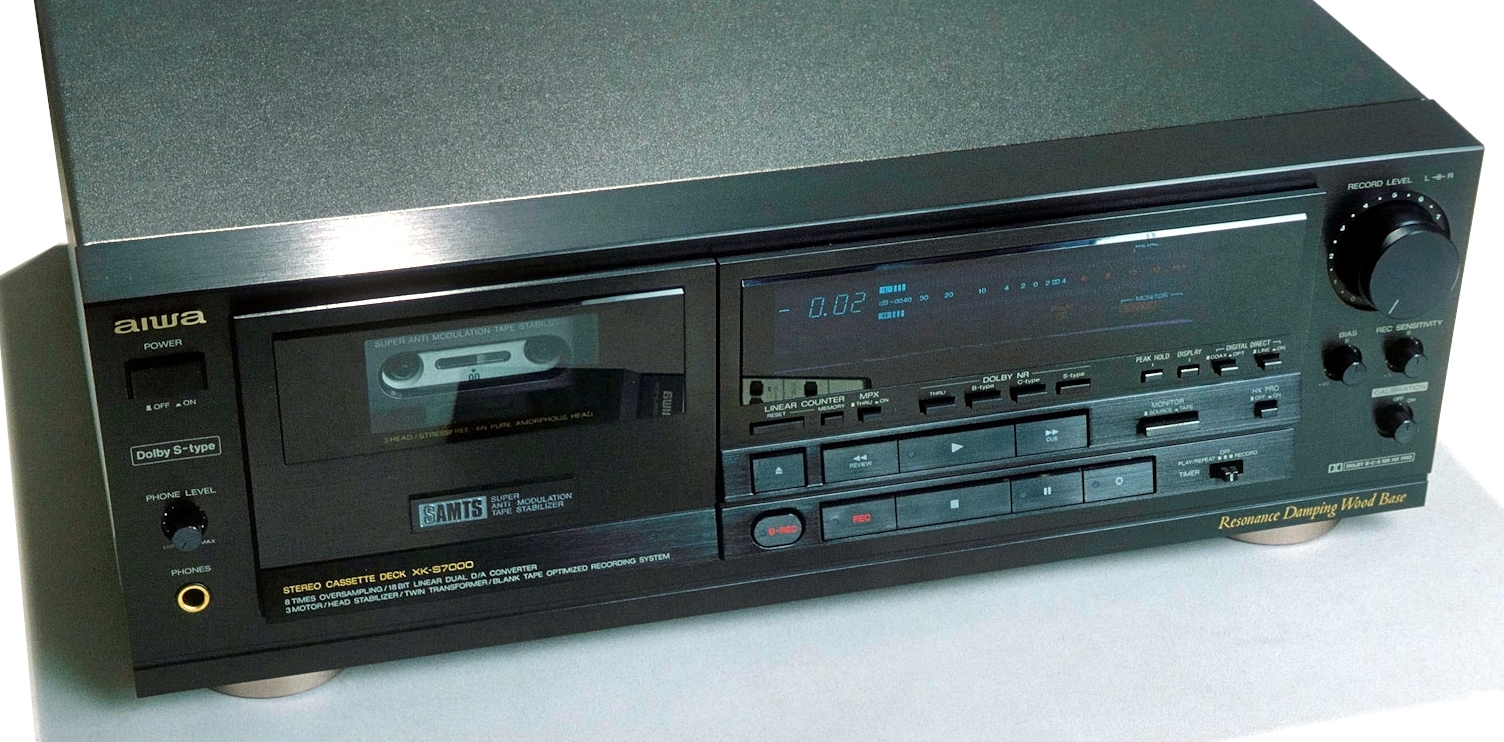
Aiwa XK-S 7000 cassette deck from circa 1992, a high-end product with that featured Dolby S and 18-bit dual digital analog converter

When the yen reached record highs in the early 1990s, Aiwa boomed thanks to its production facilities outside of Japan. With a new expansion in mini component systems like bookshelf stereos, Aiwa made a return to the Japanese market and captured 20% market share in that field in 1992, rising to 27% in 1994, thanks to affordability during the post-bubble recession. The company's performance was also beneficial to Sony who's own market share in mini component systems had reduced in this period.

For its 40th anniversary in 1991, the company changed its logo. In 1991, Aiwa launched its highly successful NSX line of mini-component stereo systems, combining amplifier, radio tuner, dual cassette decks, CD player and two speakers in one box. As of the mid-1990s, Aiwa held a 30% global market share in the field of these stereos and as much as 50% in the United States.

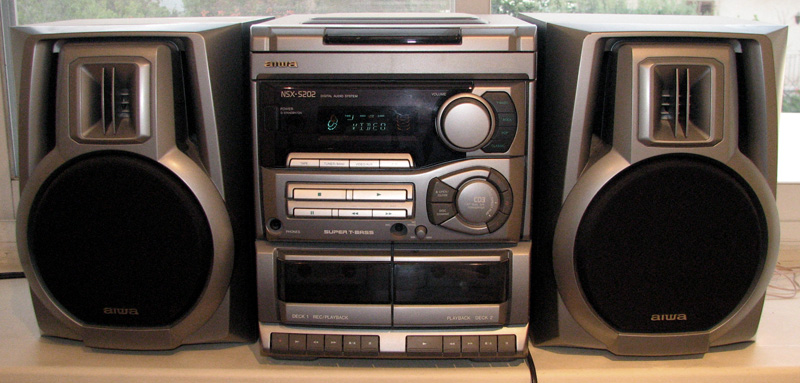
Aiwa NSX-S202 shelf stereo, c. 1998

Aiwa entered the MiniDisc player market in 1995, however the players were mostly rebadged Sony players.

=== Cuts and acquisition ===
In the late 1990s, Aiwa faced growing competition from price-cut Asian manufacturers, shrinking demand at home following a dismal Japanese economy in 1998, and disruption to its supply model following the Asian financial crises. Aiwa's profit margins quickly shrunk when it attempted to cut its own costs in response, and the company failed to invest in digital technology. Aiwa made two consecutive years of large losses and slid towards bankruptcy.

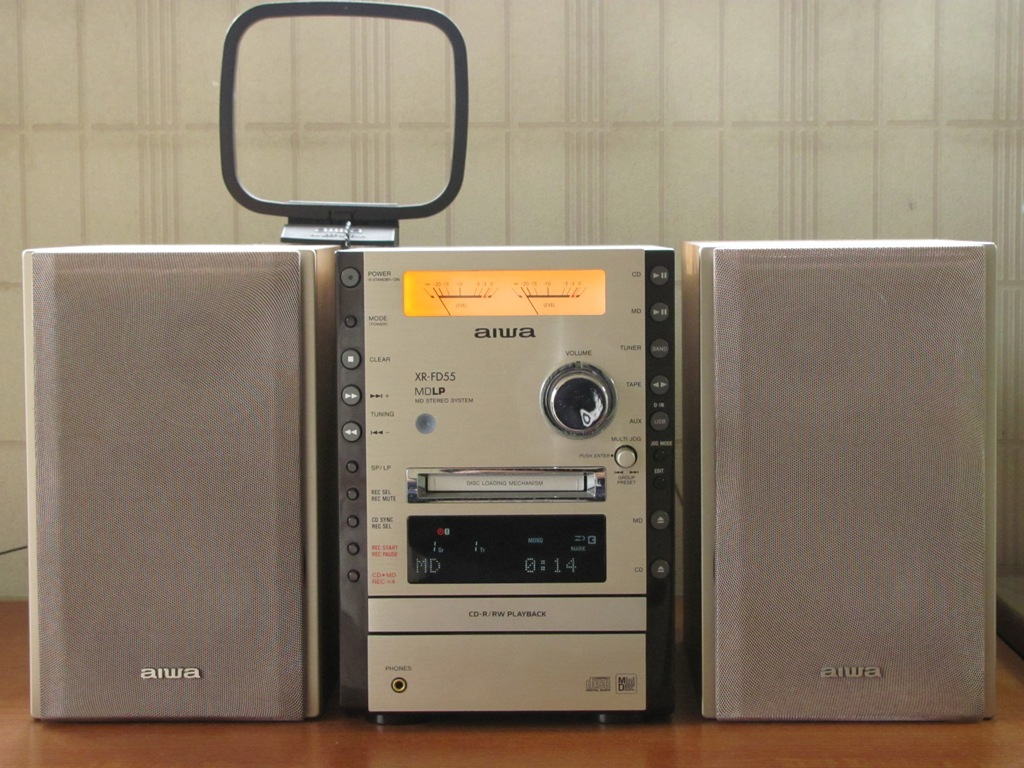
Aiwa XR-FD55 CD and MD micro shelf stereo system, c. 2002

Parent company Sony dispatched Masayoshi Morimoto to become Aiwa's new president. In March 2001, Morimoto announced a major restructuring, including the halving of its workforce, following a second consecutive loss–making year. It also announced the closure of all but one of its manufacturing plants, including all in its home country. Sony also injected Aiwa with capital by increasing its stake in the subsidiary to 61 percent.

In February 2002, Sony announced that it will acquire the remaining share it does not own in Aiwa by way of stock exchange. Sony president Kunitake Andō told reporters that "In the past we have grown through competing with each other. This no longer works". In fiscal year ending 2002, a net loss of 53 billion yen was reported for Aiwa, up from a loss of 30 billion in 2001 and itself up from a loss of 9.9 billion in 2000. It was made worse by retirement benefit payouts related to its workforce cuts as part of its failed turnaround efforts. Its workforce had been cut by 90% between 2001 and 2002. The acquisition was completed effective as of December 1, 2002.

=== Brand relaunch ===
The Aiwa logo, used from 2003 onwards until the brand's discontinuation by Sony

On January 8, 2003, Sony announced the rebranding and relaunch of the now-defunct Aiwa as a "youth focused, PC-centric" electronics brand. A new logo was presented to the world's media along with a statement of Sony's intention to invest in and "revitalize" the Aiwa brand. The direction proposed was to capitalize on the growing trend among personal-computer-literate teenagers and young adults to use their PCs for all forms of entertainment (television, films, music, chat). It was also used to expand in markets where Sony is not as strong.

Aiwa introduced its first digital audio players at CES 2004, including both flash players and a 2GB hard disk player. They notably supported MP3 format while Sony's own branded players only played ATRAC. Aiwa's portable CD players were equipped with a so-called E.A.S.S. G.P. (Electronic Anti-Shock System) feature with the aim of allowing smooth, skip-free Audio CD playback despite damaged media and external shaking.

However the new direction of Aiwa under Sony did not meet consumer and sales expectations. On January 21, 2005, new product development ended, and by 2007, Aiwa products were discontinued and no longer sold in the market outside its home market. Sony announced the termination of the brand entirely on May 14, 2008 but continued to provide support for existing products.

== Brand licensing ==
Despite the brand having been abandoned by Sony in the 2000s, the Aiwa name returned in 2015 and has since been used by various companies globally. The trademark is now mostly owned by Towada Audio since 2017. Aiwa Acquisitions LLC/Infinity Lifestyle Brands is the company that uses the Aiwa trademark in North America while Audio Mobile Americas A.S. uses it in Latin America.

=== Aiwa Corp (Chicago) and Sakar International ===
An American audio company known as Hale Devices, Inc. were granted the rights to the brand name from Sony in the US market and abroad. The Chicago based company, which was headed by Joe Born, also then renamed itself to Aiwa Corporation. In April 2015 it launched its first Aiwa product, the Exos-9 speaker. The company launched a number of Aiwa branded products in the following years, including the Prodigy and Arc-1 headphones.

Aiwa Exos-9 Bluetooth speaker, 2015

In September 2020, Aiwa Corporation and Aiwa Co., Ltd. of Japan announced that their businesses had unified, with a vision to rebuild Aiwa as a single global brand. The two companies had previously fought court cases over Aiwa trademarks in Illinois as well as in the United Kingdom and Ireland.

It was reported in August 2021 that Aiwa Corporation filed for Chapter 11 bankruptcy. Following bankruptcy proceedings, the assets were sold to a new company (Aiwa Acquisitions LLC) affiliated with Sakar International, Inc. in November 2021, with Sakar being a licensee to Infinity Lifestyle Brands, thus making Aiwa a sister brand of Altec Lansing in the North American market. This new Aiwa showcased a number of new products at the Consumer Electronics Show 2023.

=== Aiwa Co., Ltd. (2017–present) ===
On April 11, 2017, Towada Audio, a contract manufacturer of Sony radios, acquired the Aiwa brand rights from Sony (globally, except the Americas) and created a subsidiary called Aiwa Co. Ltd. like the original Aiwa, with its director Kazuomi Nakamura being someone who joined the original Aiwa in 1989. The news of the Aiwa brand's revival was met highly positively in Japan, which showed its brand recognition.

The company launched the first Aiwa products at the end of the year, including radio cassette players, LCD televisions and record players. For global expansion, it established Aiwa Electronics International Co., Ltd., headquartered in Taipei, Taiwan. Towada Audio also appointed Gando Holding as the official Middle East representative, including Iran. From a public statement released by Aiwa Co., Ltd (Tokyo, Japan), "Aiwa Corporation (Chicago, USA) are in not in any way related to us, Aiwa Co., Ltd (Tokyo, Japan) or Aiwa Japan since 1951 to date".

In 2020, Aiwa launched the HPB-SW40 ("ButterflyAudio") through crowdsourcing in Japan, a wearable headphone with a unique design that sits on the shoulders. Also in 2020 it launched a record player style Bluetooth speaker and radio (SB-LFS30), a radio cassette recorder (TR-A30) and pocket analogue radio (AR-AP35).

Aiwa Vietnam was formed in 2020 and debuted with the release of smart TVs in the country. In 2021, Aiwa partnered with 5,000 retailers in India to relaunch in the country. Aiwa India launched a new series of smart TVs, the Magnifiq series, in July 2022. The regional headquarters of Aiwa in India, which serves the South Asia region, is currently headed by Ajay Mehta.

=== Other Aiwa makers ===
Latin America

In Mexico and other countries in Latin America, the Aiwa rights are owned by Audio Mobile Americas, S.A. based in Panama which relaunched the brand in 2017. This company sells products such as smart TVs, headphones, speakers and others.

Brazil

The Aiwa brand relaunched in Brazil in 2022 after being licensed by MK Group, owner of Mondial. It started with producing new televisions at a former Sony manufacturing plant in Manaus.

Aiwa Digital

In June 2022, Aiwa Co., Ltd. announced that it granted the use of its trademark in the digital field to a Japanese contract manufacturer named JENESIS. JENESIS then announced its first smartphone, tablet and smartwatch products under its aiwa digital series. It also sells musical instruments. New subsidiary Aiwa Marketing Japan Co., Ltd. (joint venture with Aiwa Co., Ltd.) was established in 2023.

Aiwa Home

Since 2023, the New Jersey, USA based company Xtreme Connected Home, a part of JEM Accessories, has licensed the Aiwa brand from its North American owner and released home and kitchen appliances domestically.

==== Iran ====
In Iran, Aiwa products are officially distributed by Gando Holding through its subsidiary Gando Service. The company operates the official Aiwa Iran website (iranaiwa.com) and provides after-sales service and distribution nationwide.

== Gallery ==
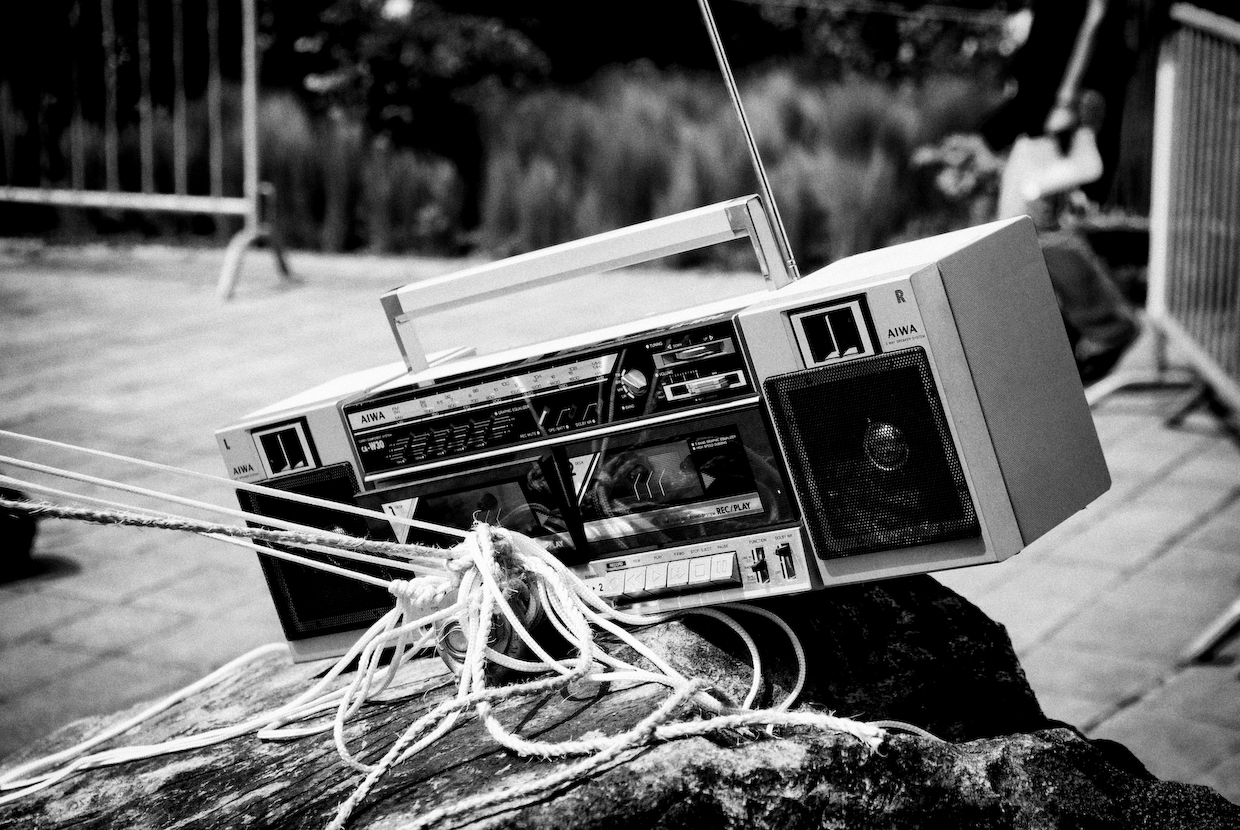
AIWA CA-W30 dual cassette boombox

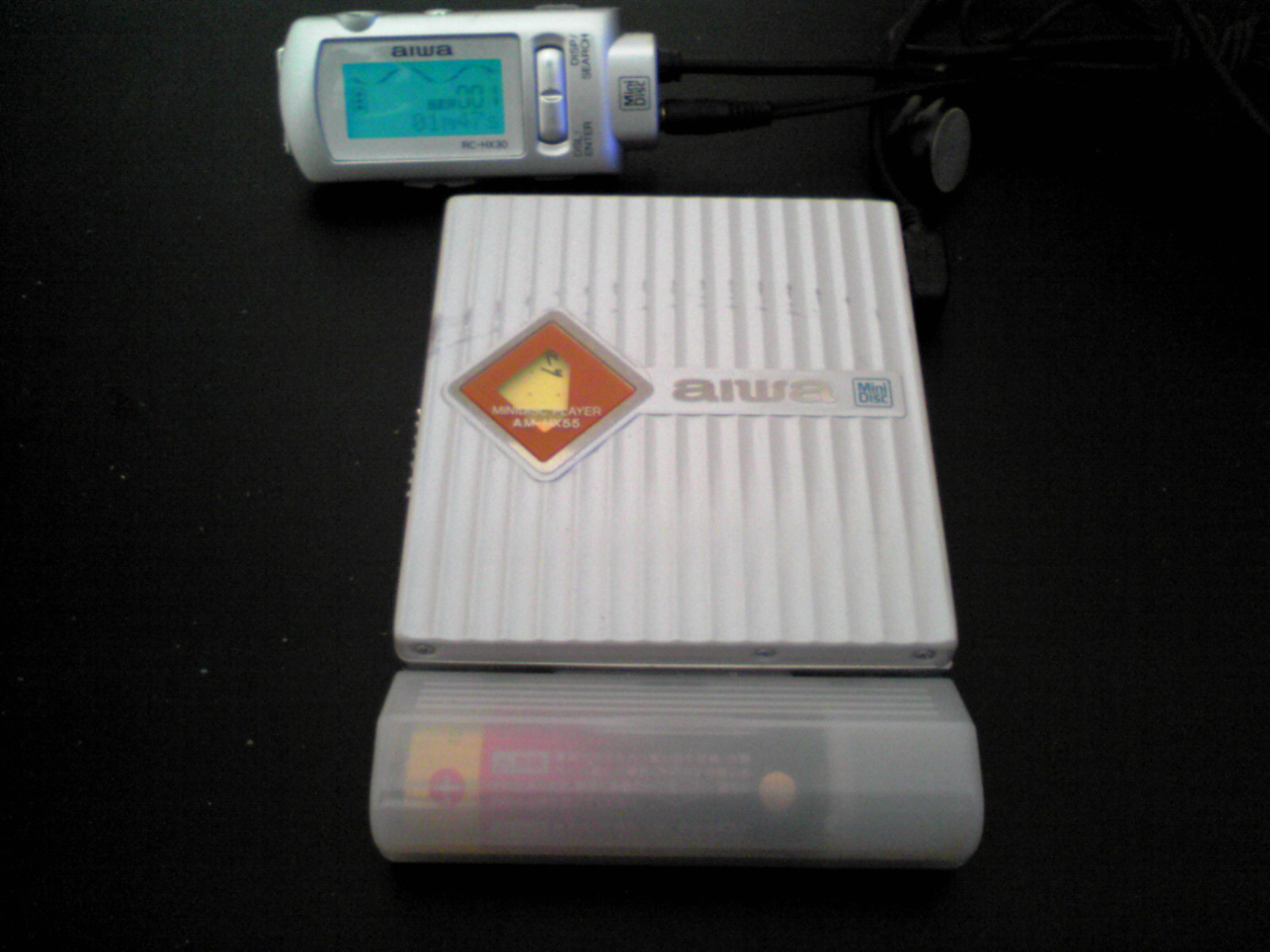
Aiwa AM-XH55 MiniDisc player

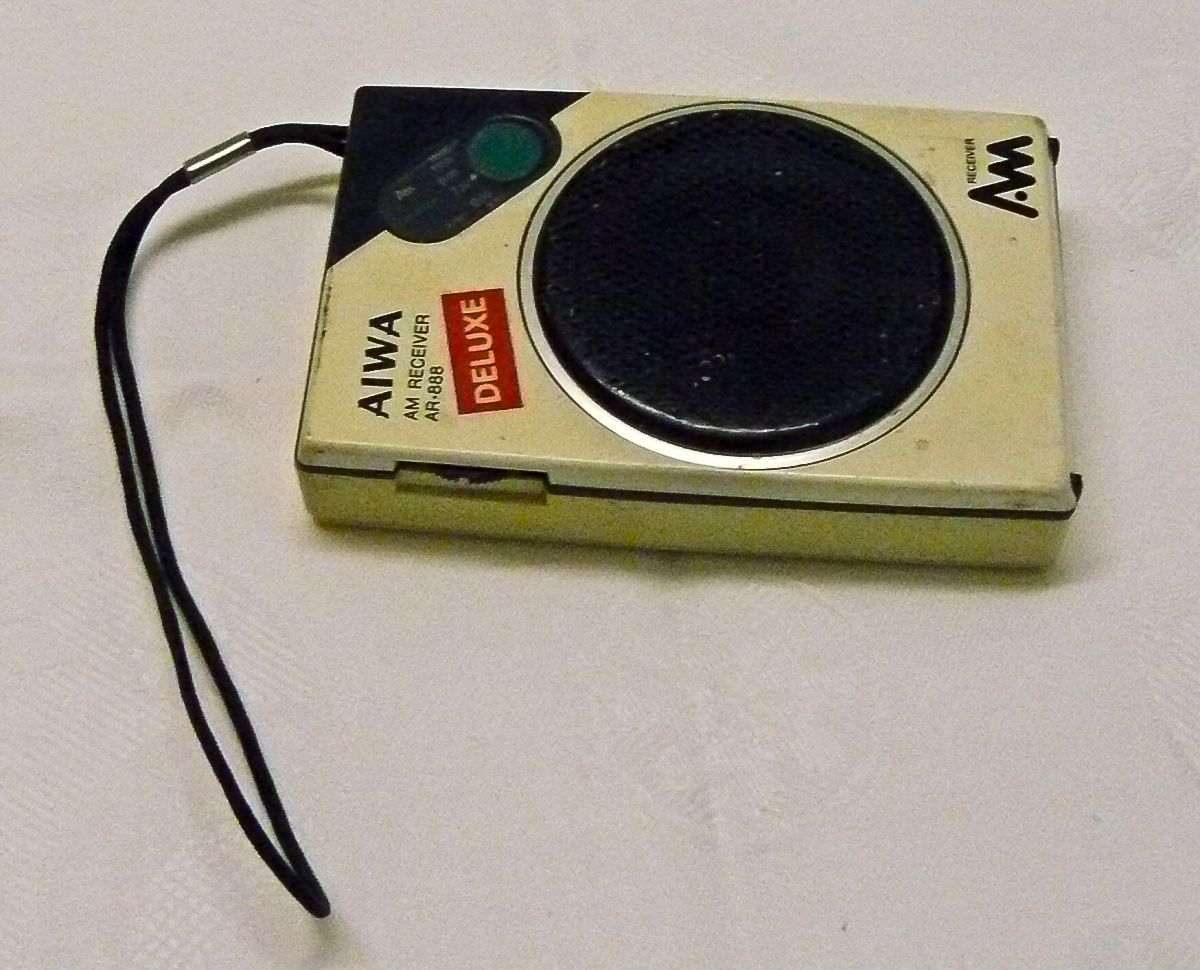
AIWA AR-888 AM receiver

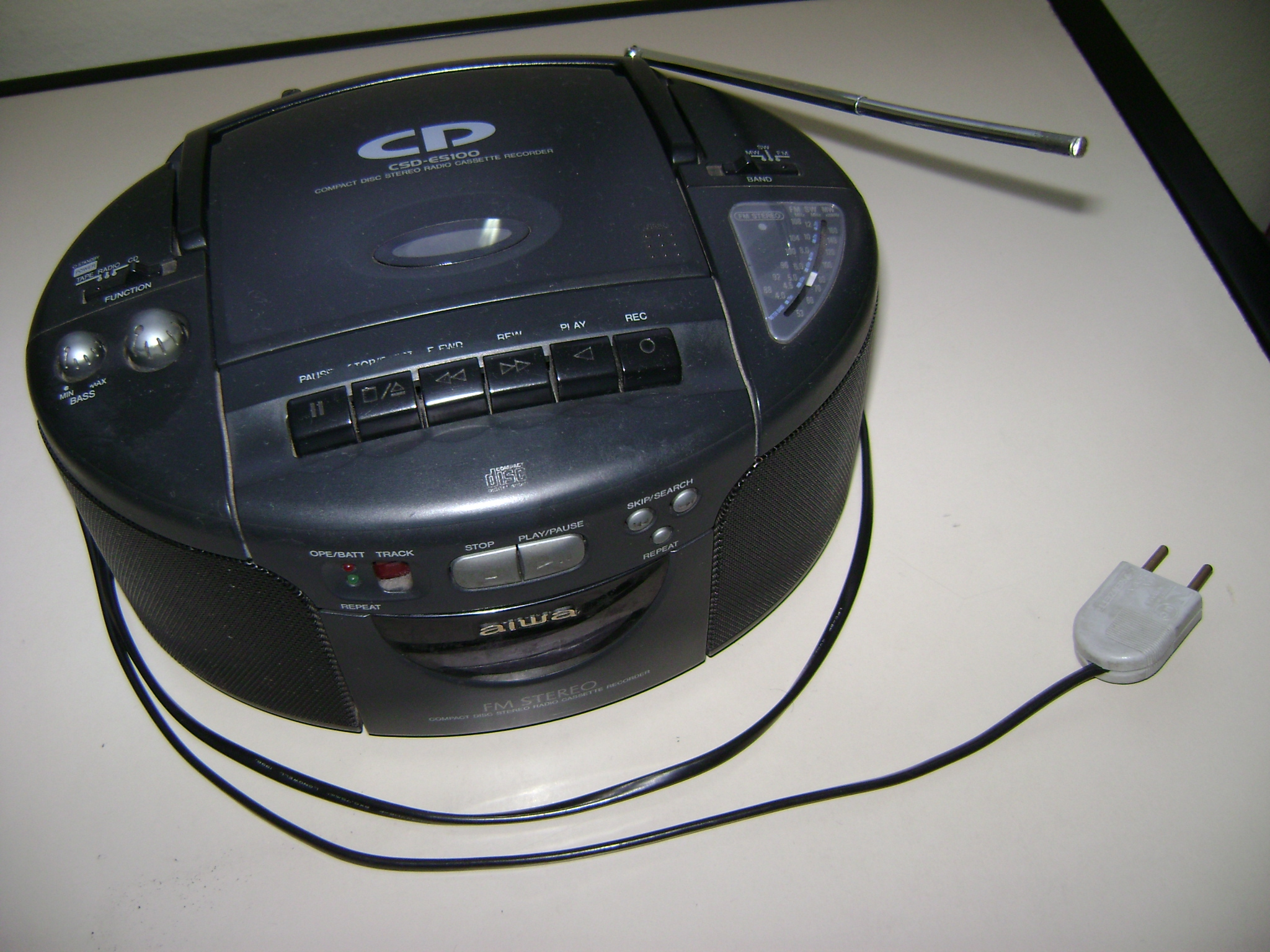
Aiwa CSD-ES100 compact CD/radio/cassette recorder

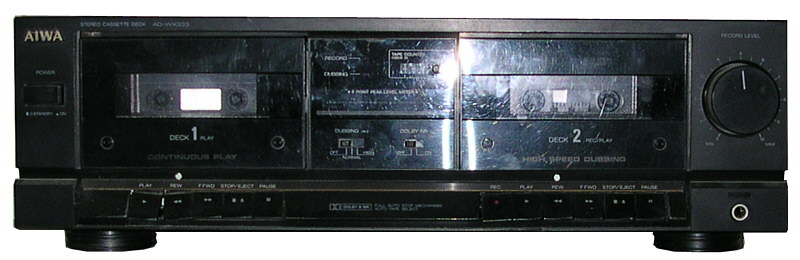
AIWA AD WX 333 cassette deck

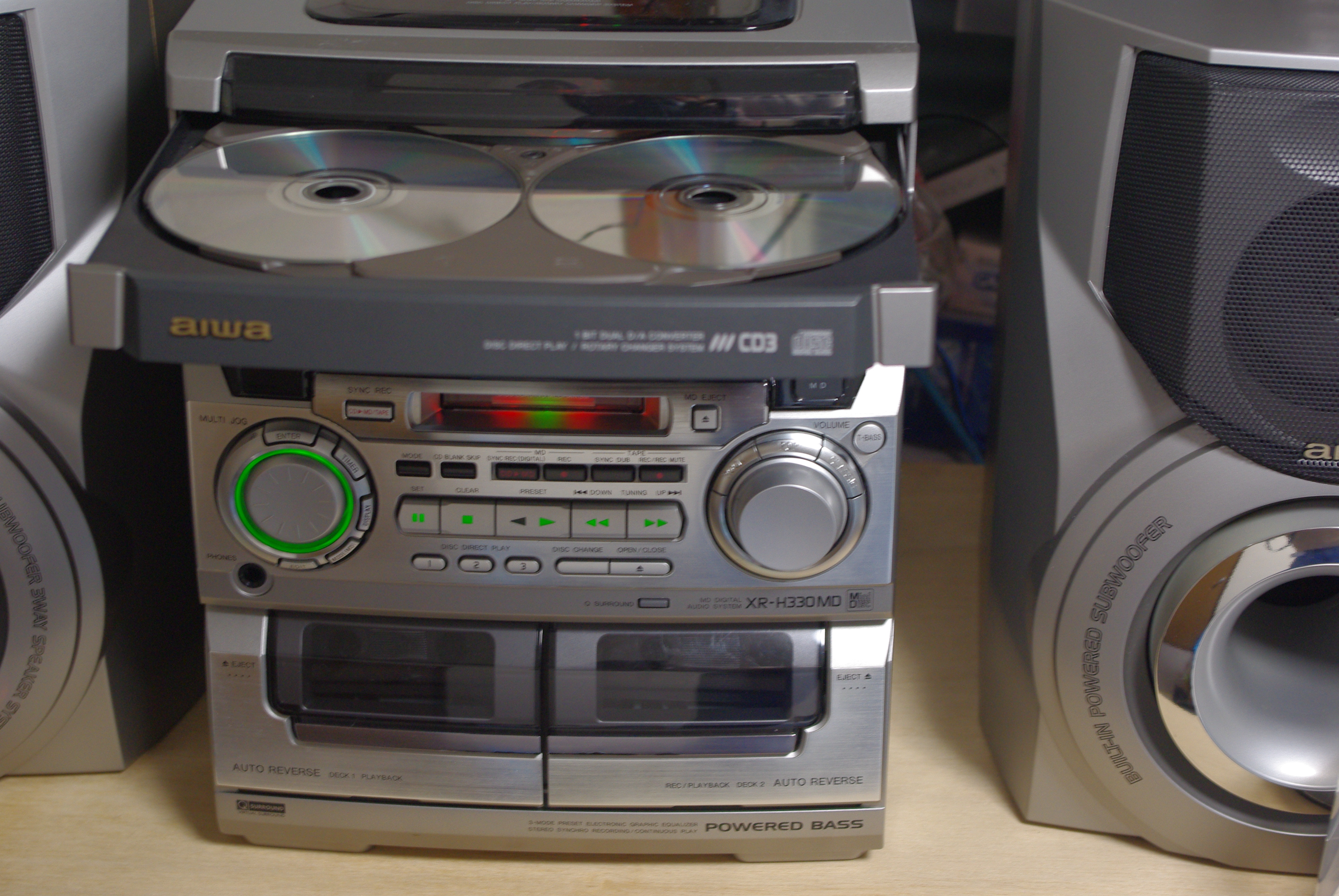
Aiwa XR-H330 MD micro system (1999)

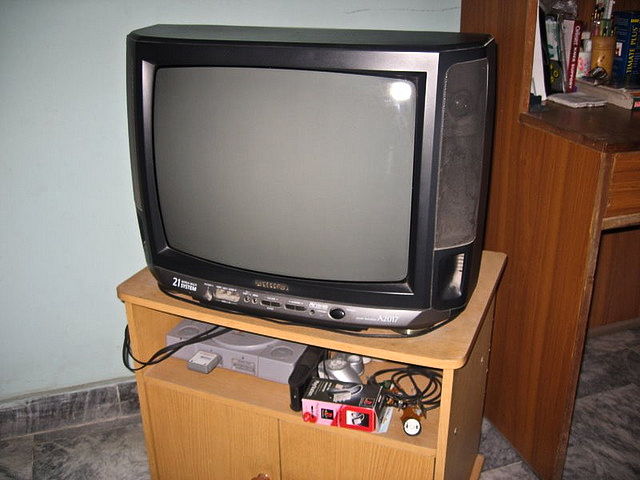
Aiwa TV-A2017S 21" television

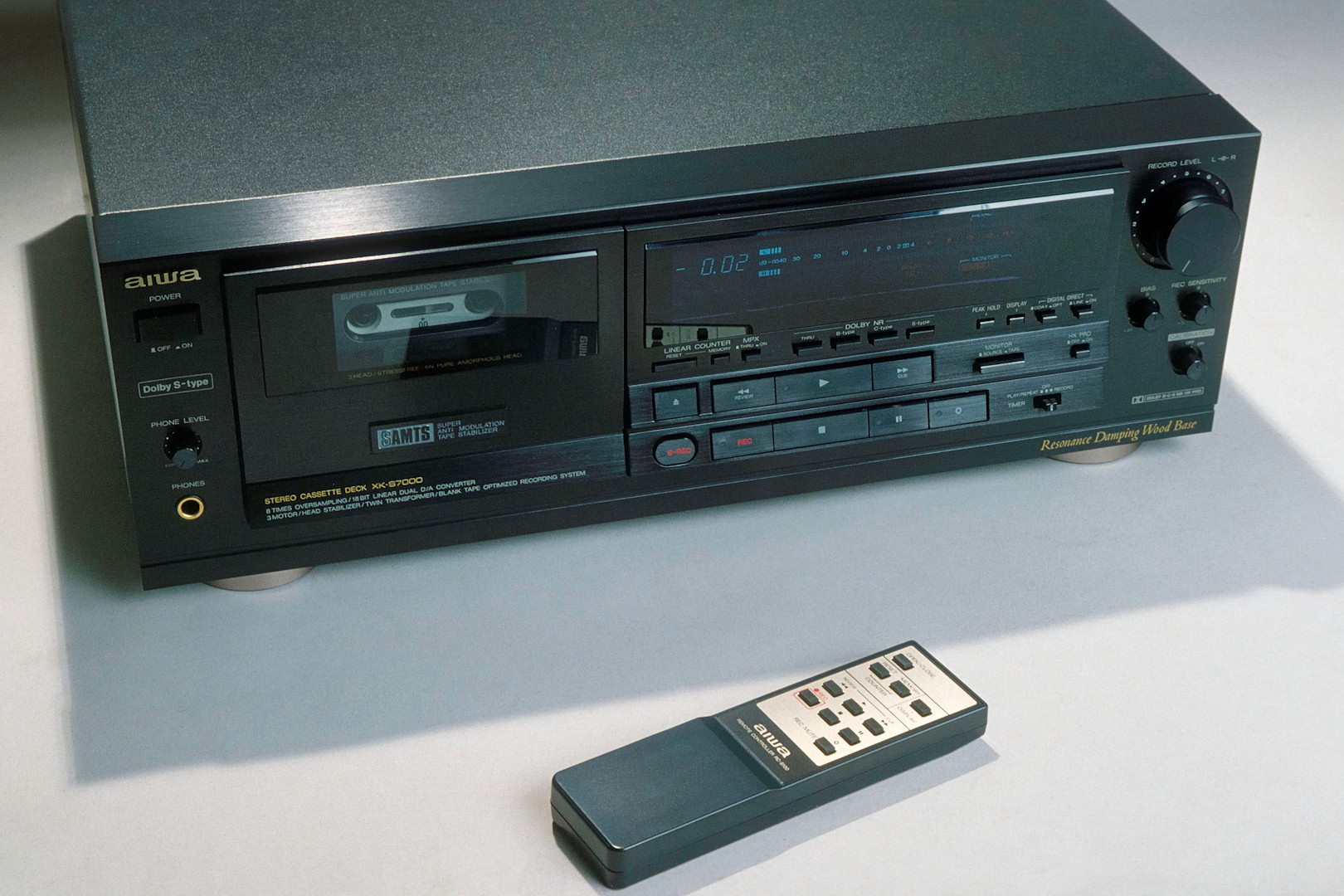
Aiwa S7000 cassette recorder (1992)

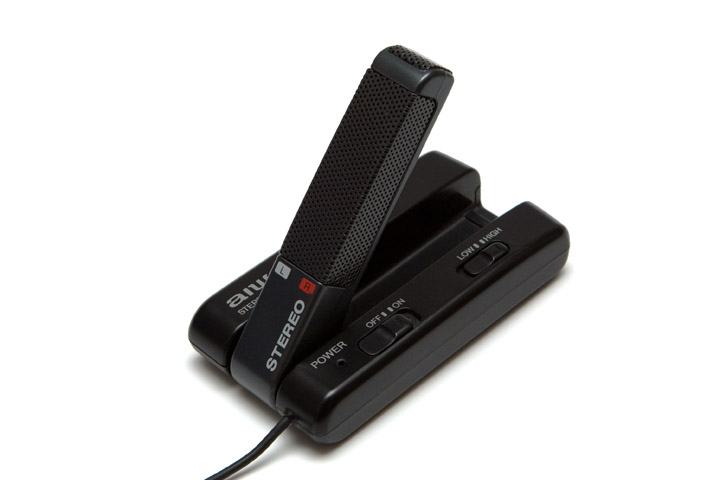
Aiwa CM-S32 microphone

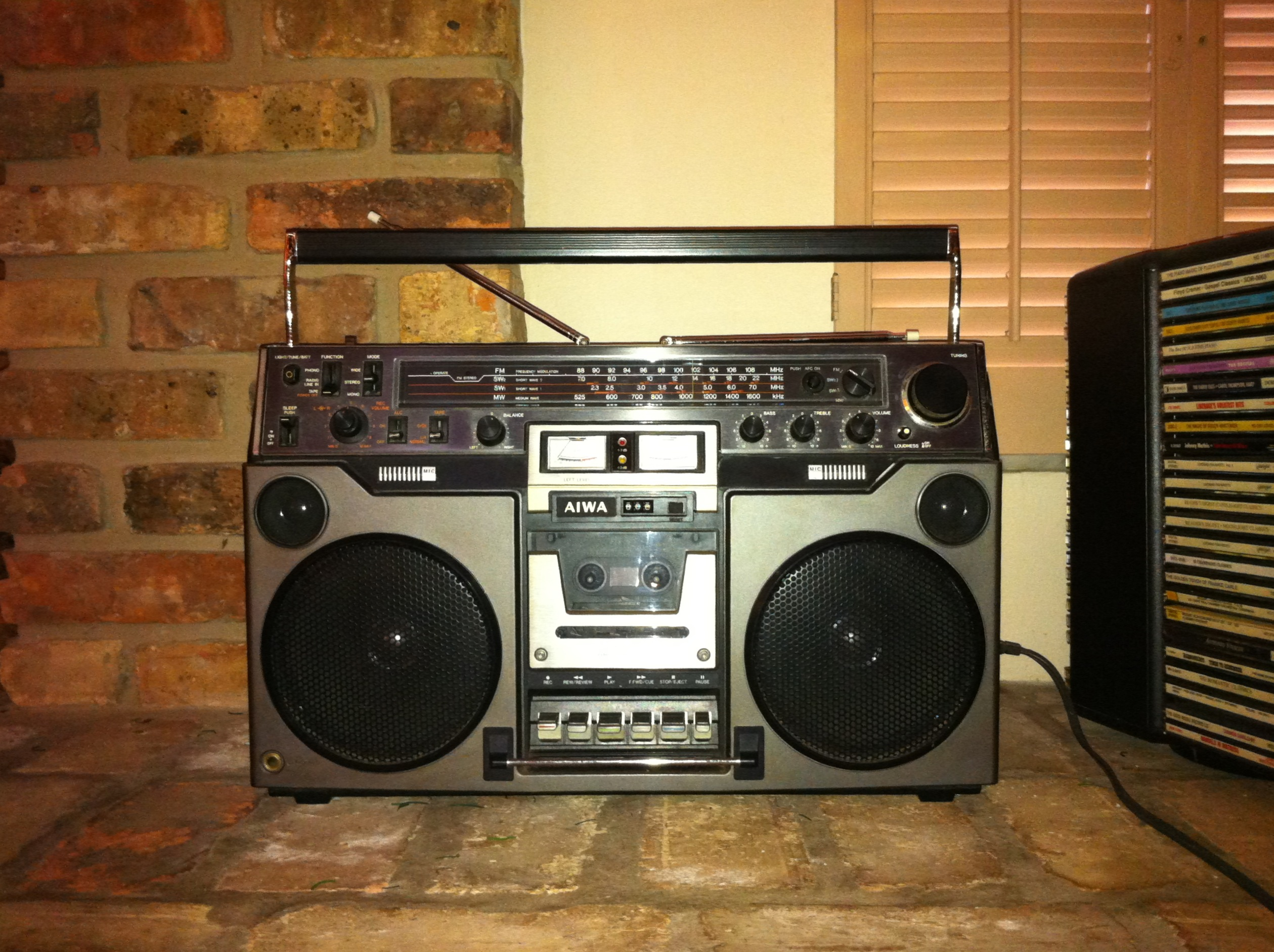
AIWA TPR-950 boombox

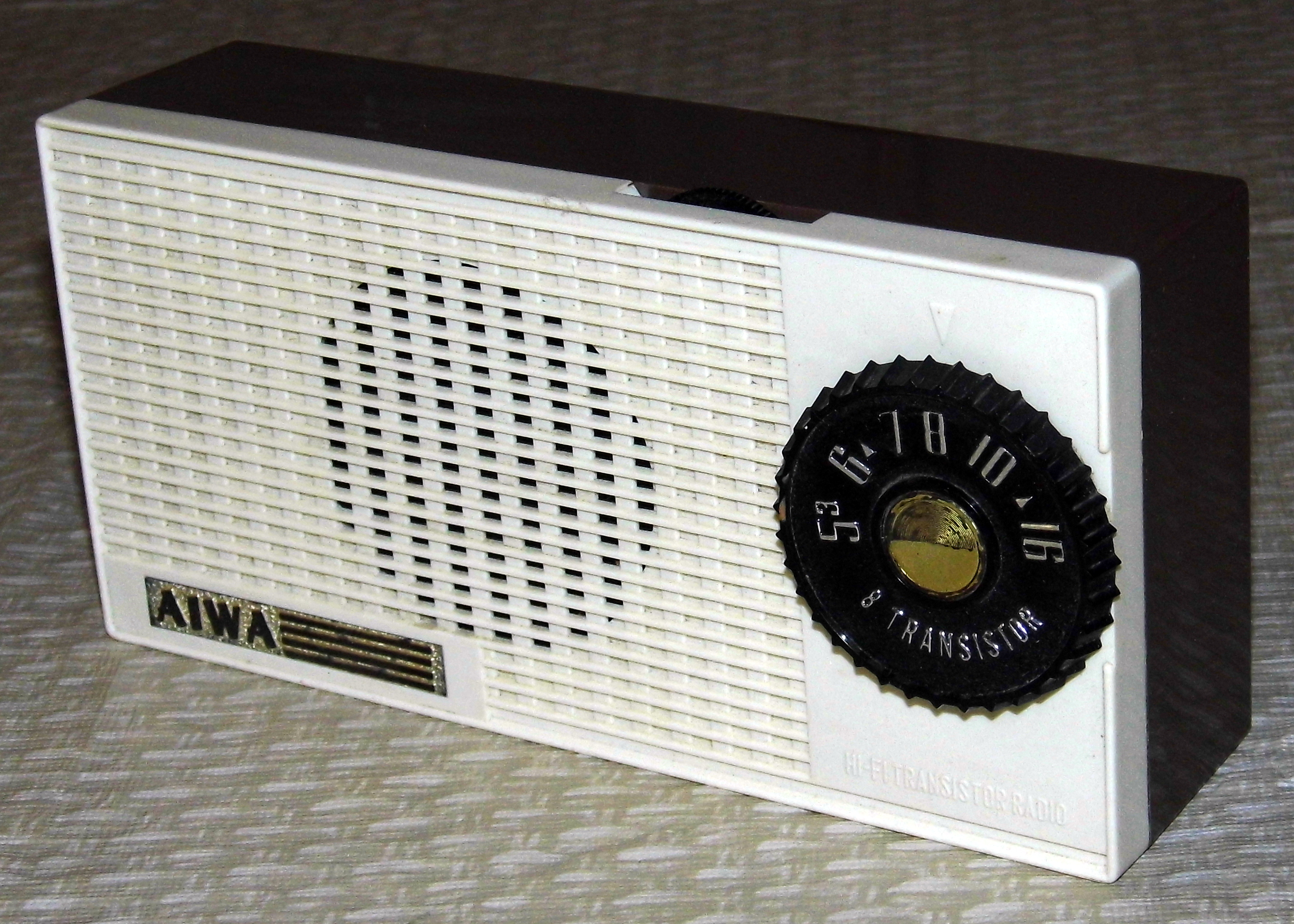
AIWA AR-852 8-transistor radio

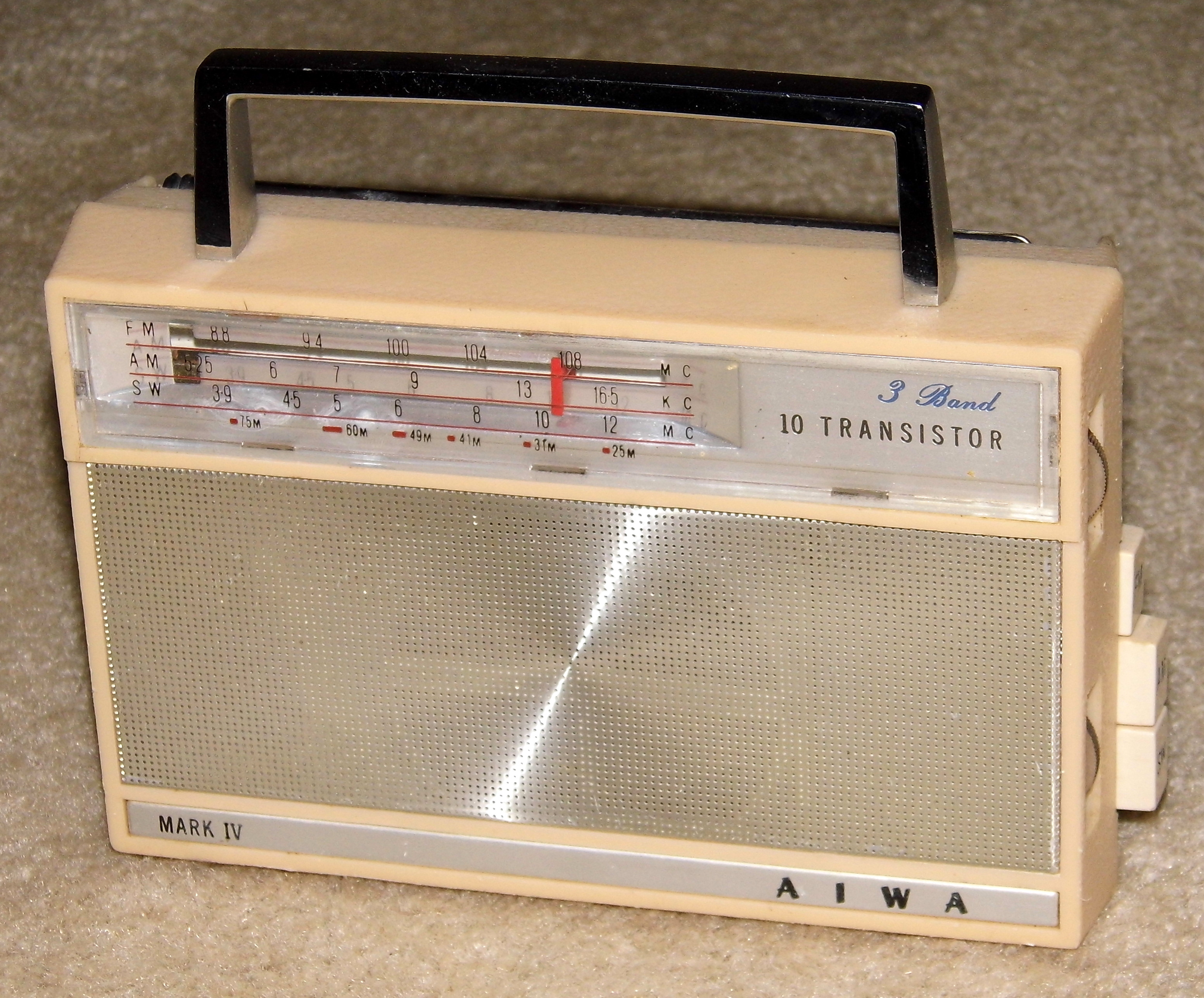
AIWA AR-123 10-transistor triple band radio

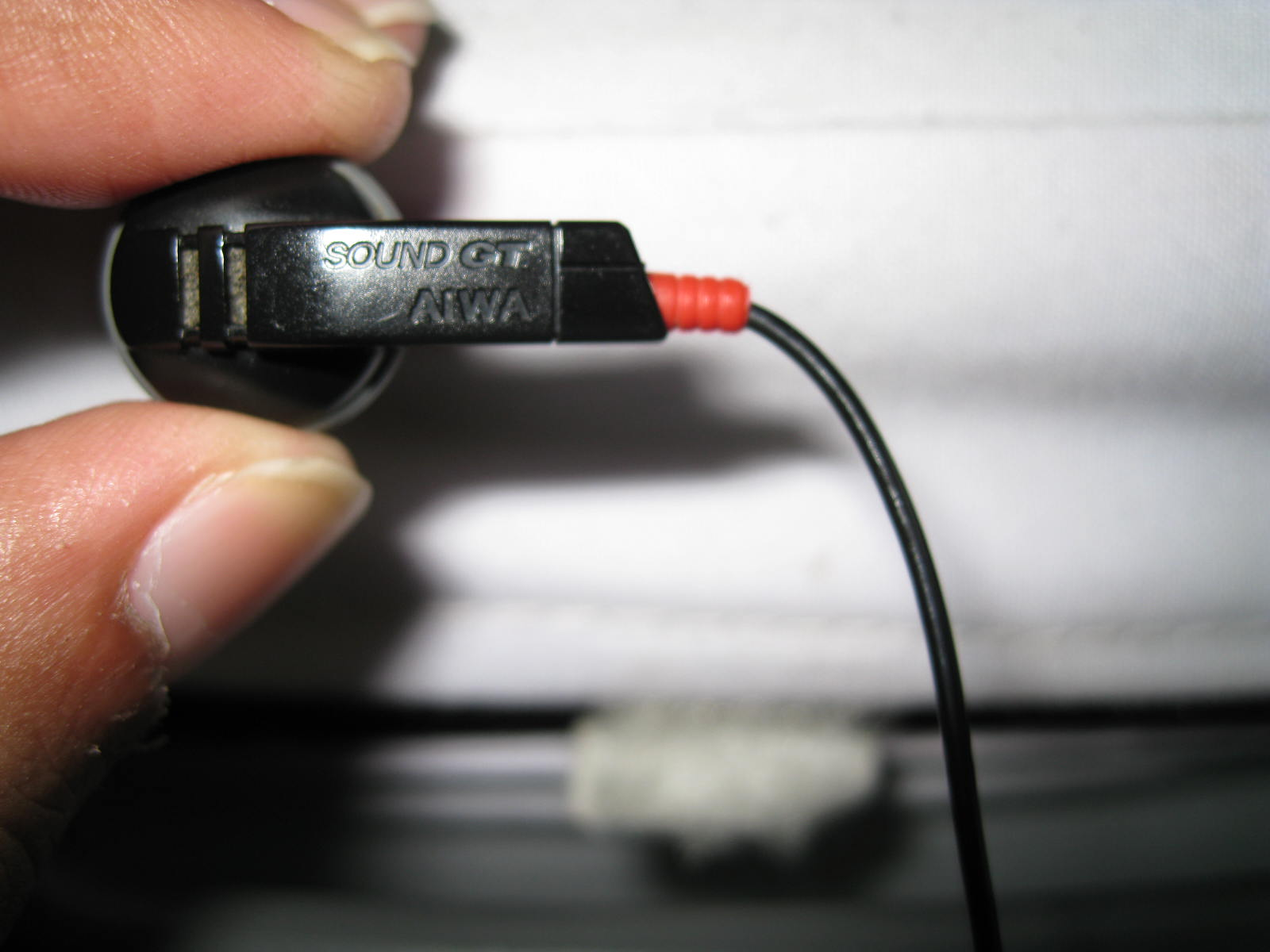
AIWA Sound GT earphone (c. 1990)

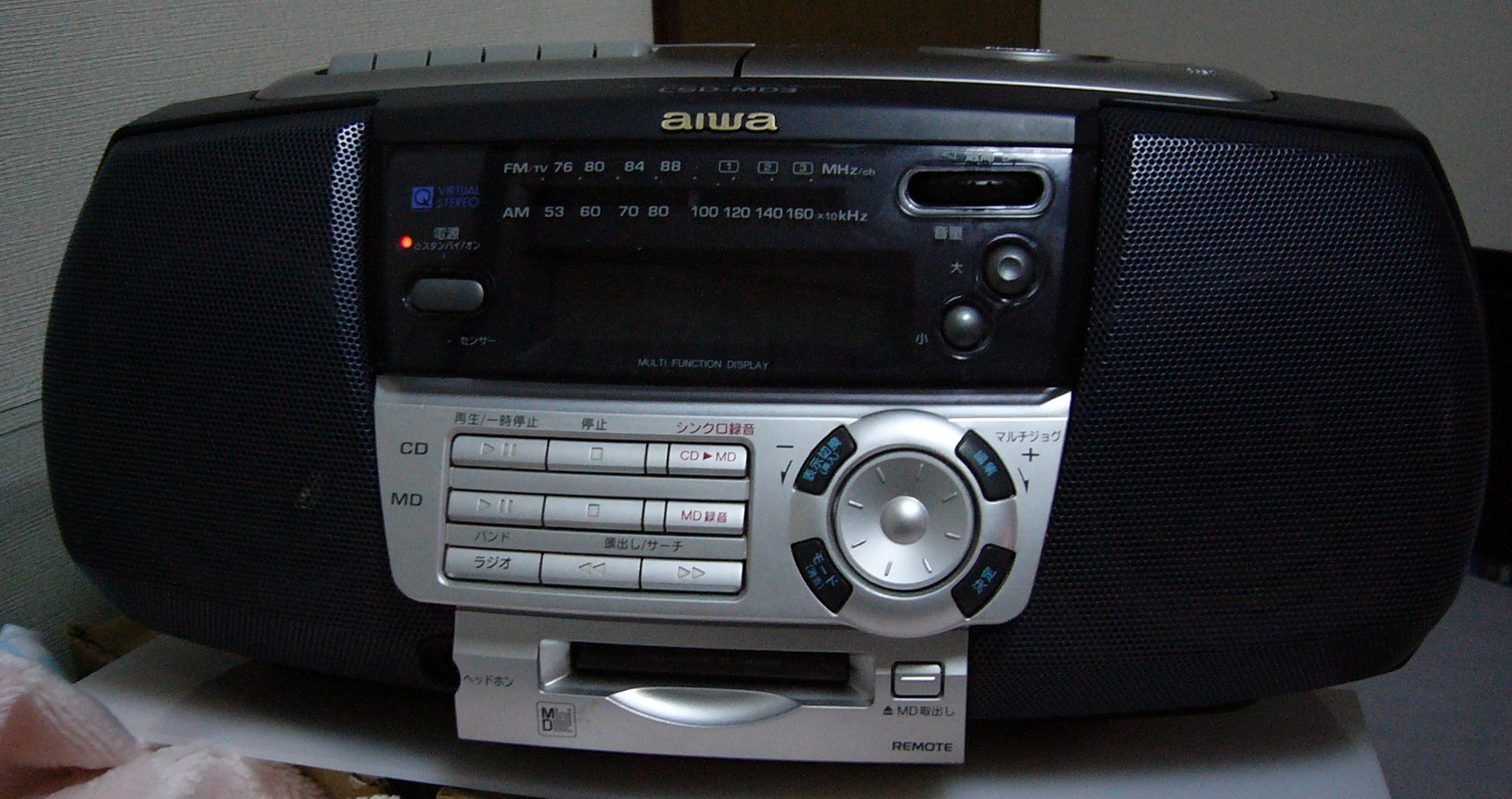
Aiwa CSD-MD3 compact CD/cassette/radio/MiniDisc player

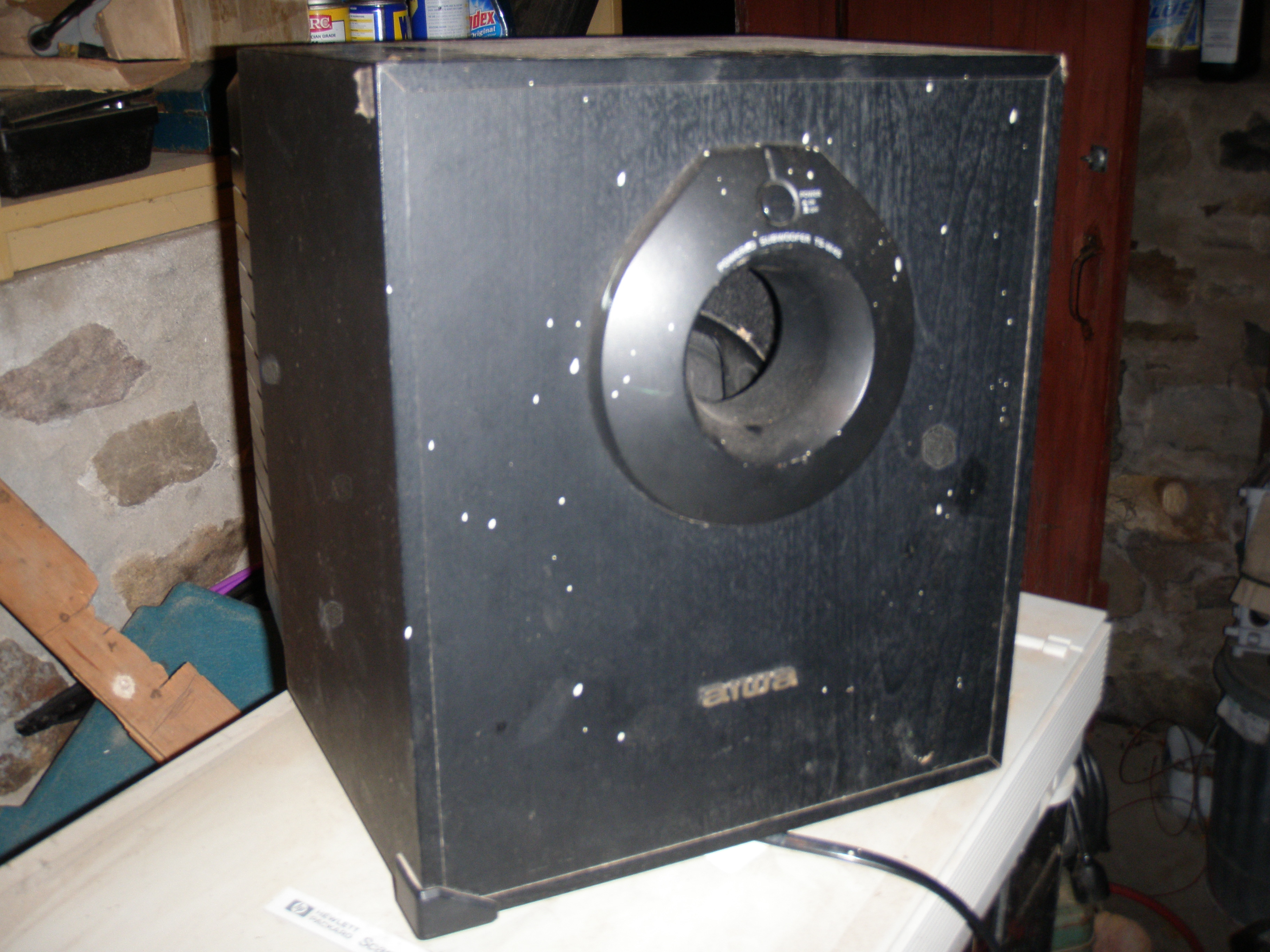
Aiwa loudspeaker enclosure

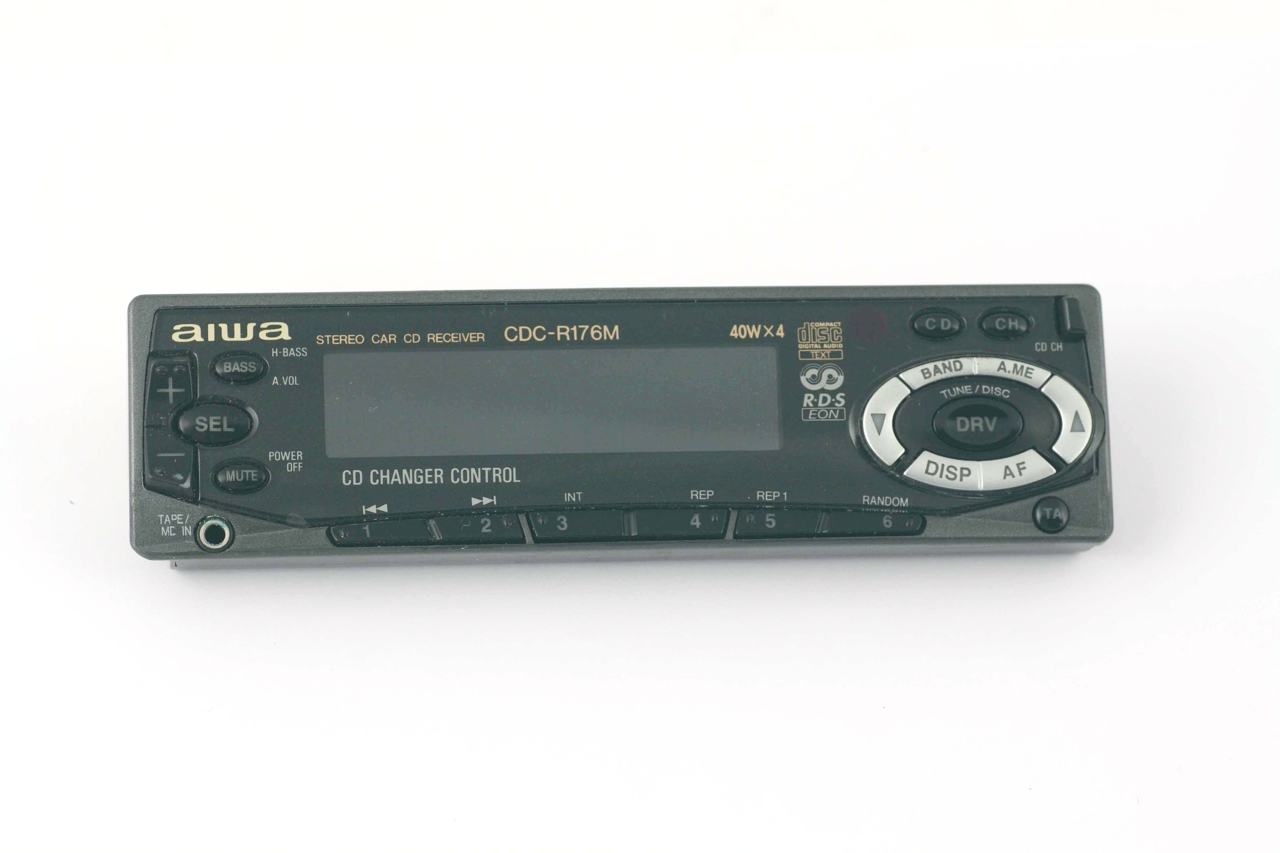
Aiwa CDC-R176M car CD/radio receiver (c. mid-1990s)

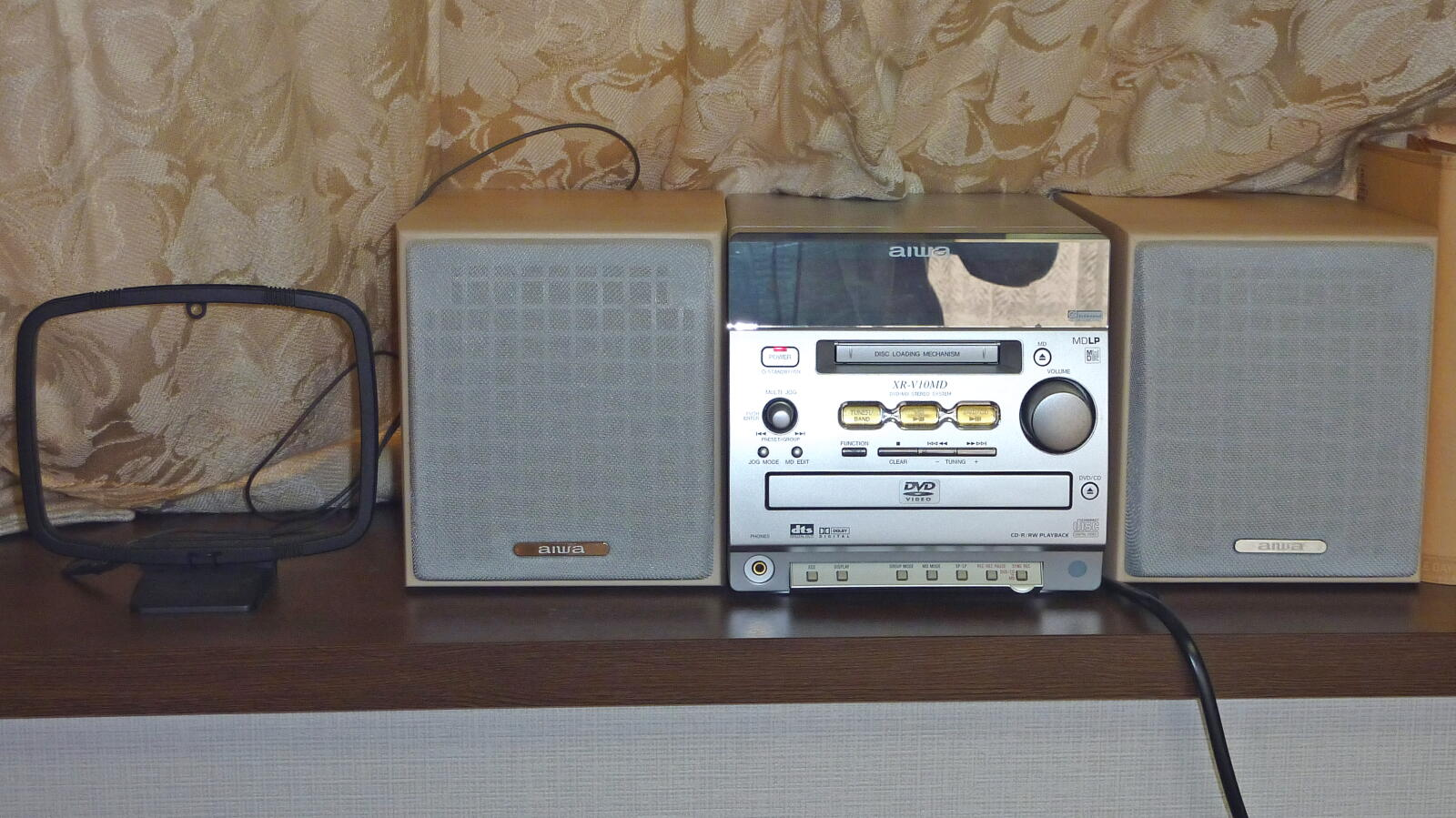
Aiwa XR-V10MD micro system with MD/DVD support

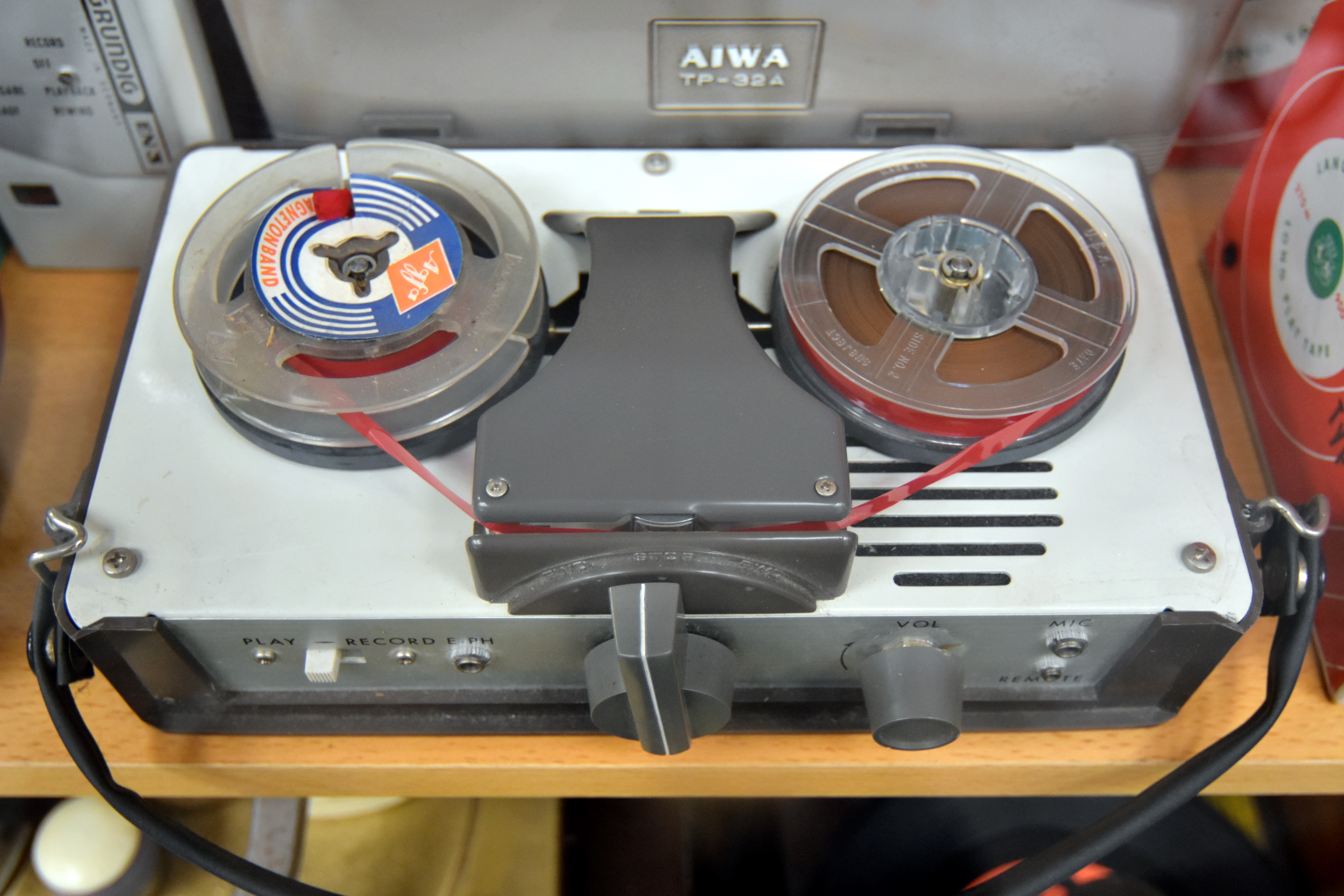
Aiwa TP-32A, c. 1960

Aiwa Micro Cassette Recorder, ca. 1990s (video)

== See also ==
- List of companies of Japan
- List of defunct consumer brands
- List of electronics brands
- List of electronics companies
- Sony Corporation shareholders and subsidiaries
- Akai
