= Mondia =

Mondia may refer to:

- Mondia (bicycle company)
- Mondia (plant)

== See also ==
- Mondial (disambiguation)
