= Towada Audio =

Japanese manufacturer of radio, television broadcasting and communications equipment

Towada Audio Corporation
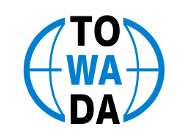

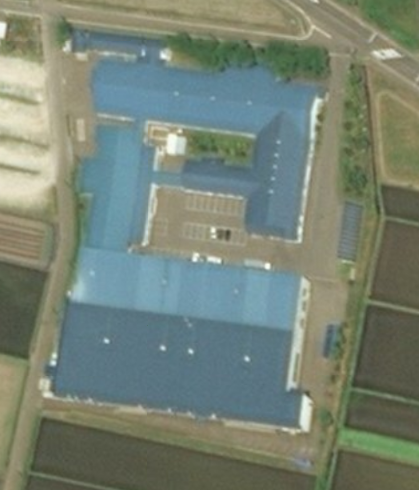
- Headquarters
- Company type: Kabushiki gaisha
- Industry: Telecom
- Founded: 1974; 52 years ago
- Headquarters: Kosaka, Akita, Japan
- Area served: Worldwide
- Key people: Masakazu Gamoo
- Products: Radio, Television, CCD camera
- Revenue: JPY 11.2 billion (2011)
- Number of employees: 160
- Subsidiaries: Aiwa
- Website: http://www.towada-gp.com/audio/

Towada Audio Corporation is a Japanese manufacturer of radio, television broadcasting and communications equipment headquartered in Kosaka, Akita.

== Sony models manufactured by Towada Audio ==
- ICF-801
- ICF-SW7600GR
- ICF-SW77
- XC-73
- XC-75
- AC-VQ850

== Gallery ==
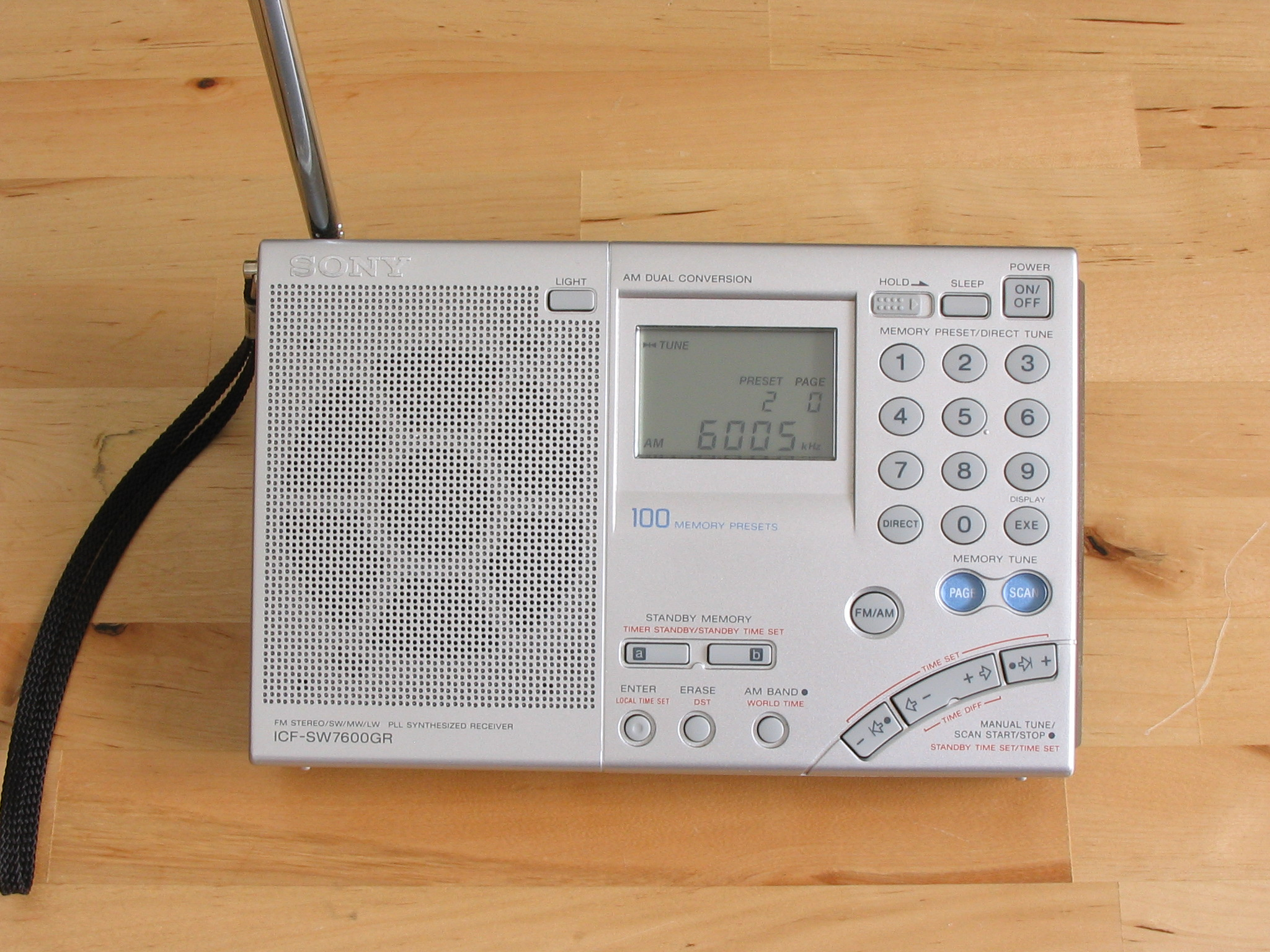
ICF-SW7600GR

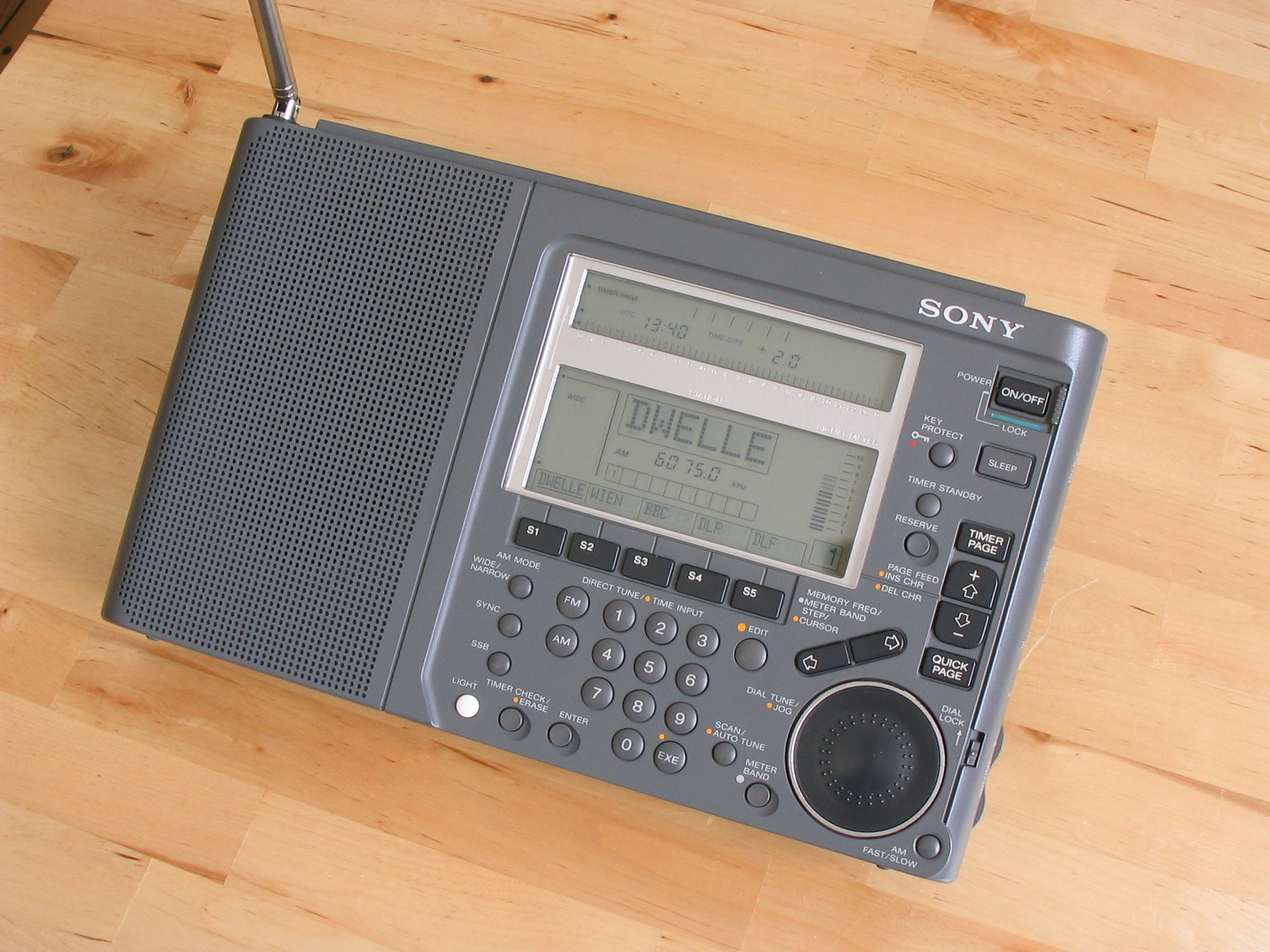
ICF-SW77

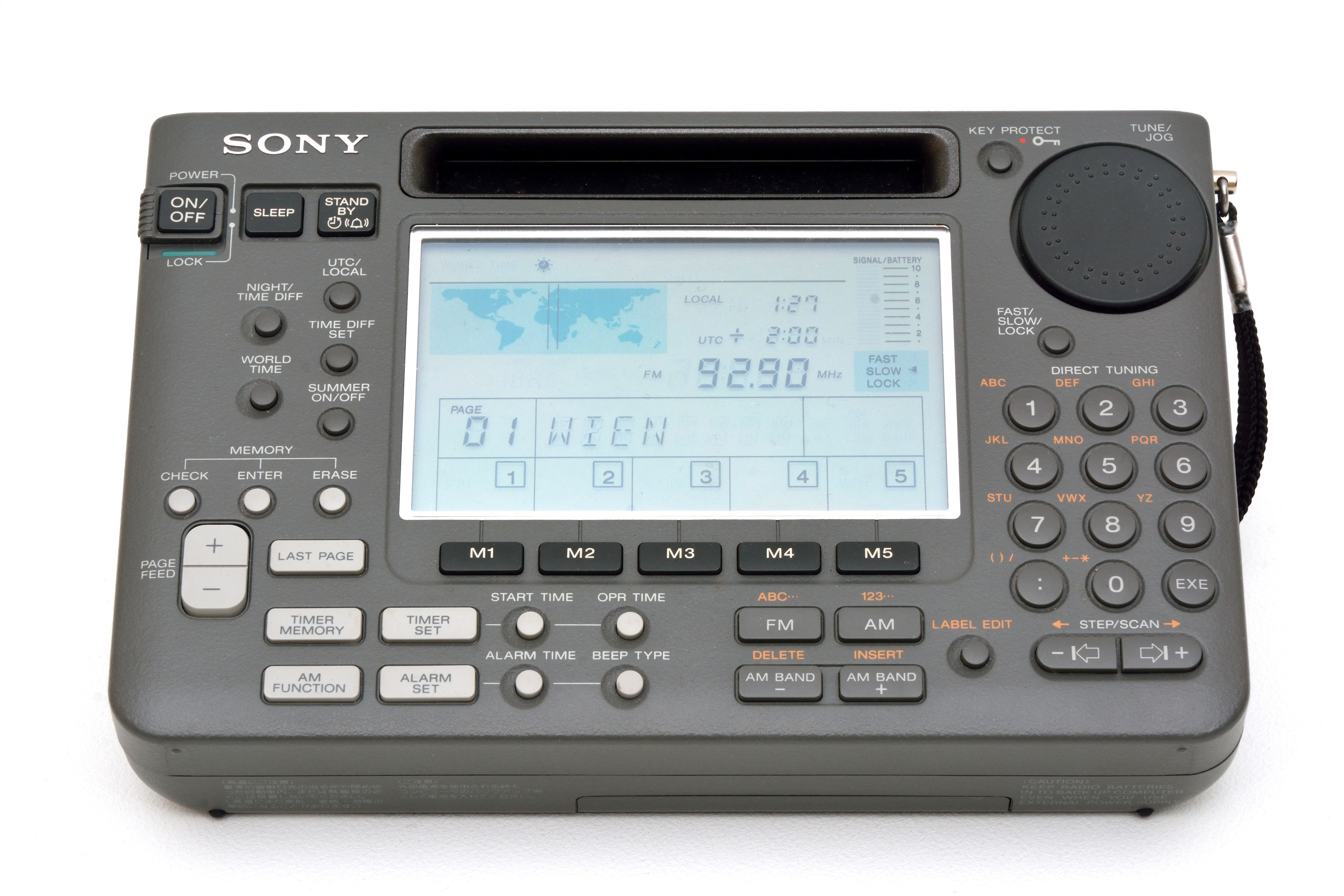
ICF-SW55

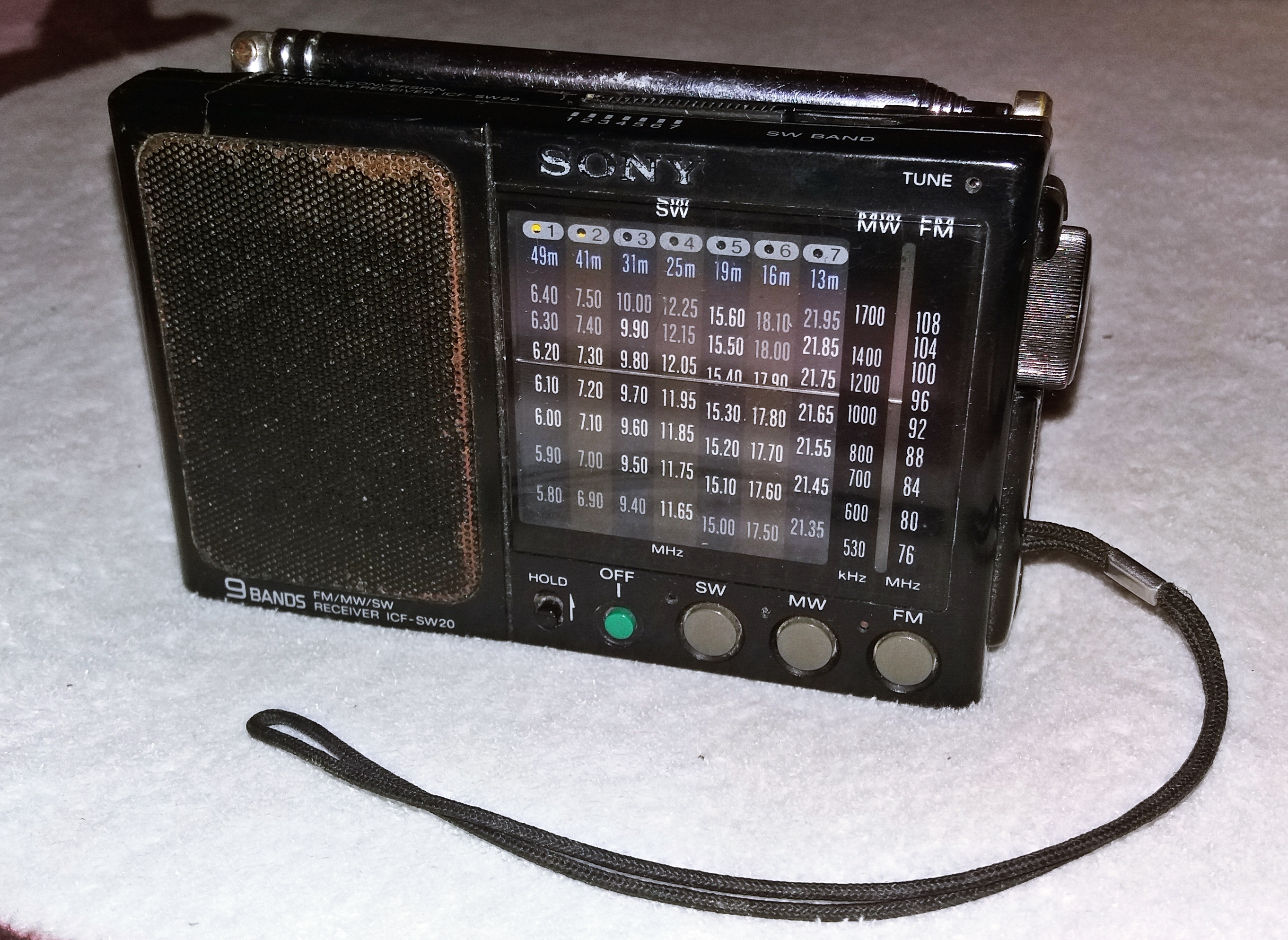
ICF-SW20

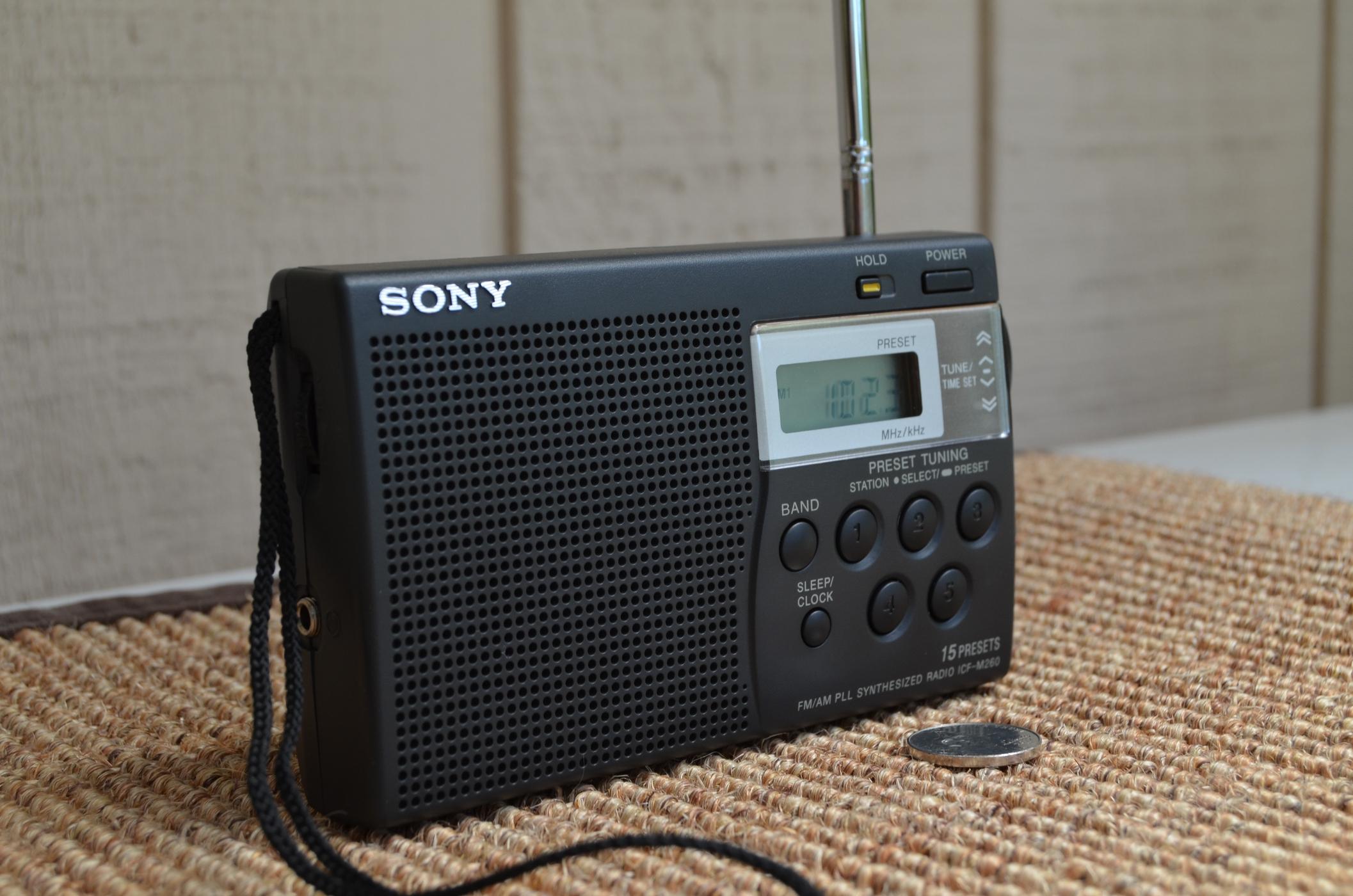
ICF-M260

== Akita's Aiwa ==
Towada Audio obtained rights from Sony to use the Aiwa brand name and established a new company called Aiwa in 2017.
