= Mondial =

Mondial may refer to:

- Mondial (amusement ride manufacturer)
- Mondial (motorcycle manufacturer)
- Mondial House
- Mondial (company), a Brazilian electronics company
- Mondial language, an international auxiliary language
- Ferrari Mondial, an automobile manufactured from 1980 to 1993
- FIFA World Cup, the highest level football tournament
