= Mondial (company) =

Brazilian company

- Industry: Home appliances
- Founded: 1999
- Headquarters: Barueri, São Paulo, Brazil
- Number of employees: 1,900
- Website: www.mondial.com.br

Mondial is a Brazilian consumer electronics manufacturing company based in Barueri, São Paulo. It operates in three segments: electroportable, audio and video and power tools.

Founded in 1999 under the name MK Mondial Eletrodomésticos S/A, Mondial took a leading position in the small appliance sector, being the second-largest company in the lines of heaters and juicers; the third in the segment of fans and blenders; and the fifth in sandwiches and coffee makers.

The company has two manufacturing facilities: one in Conceição do Jacuípe, Bahia and another in Manaus, Amazonas. It also has reverse engineering and product development departments with four offices, two in Brazil (one in São Paulo and another in Bahia), and two in Asia: (Zhejiang and Guangzhou, China), a distribution center in Araçariguama (interior of São Paulo) as well as official distributors in the United States, Spain, Portugal, Greece, Panama, Nicaragua, Argentina, Colombia, Paraguay and Uruguay.
